= 2010 Kyiv Victory Day Parade =

Anniversary event

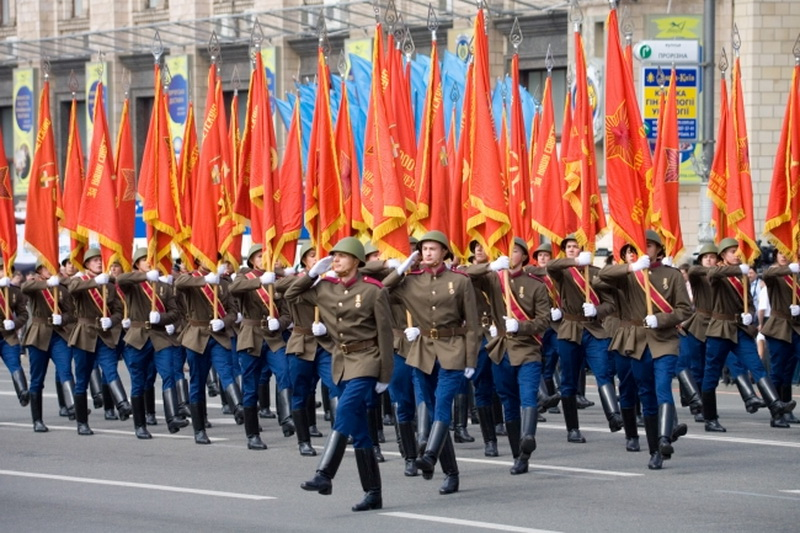
A color guard in Kyiv.

The 2010 Kyiv Victory Day Parade was held on May 9, 2010, in Kyiv, honoring the 65th anniversary of the Soviet Union's victory in the Great Patriotic War (in 2015 Ukraine altered this day to Victory Day over Nazism in World War II and in 2023 abolished it all together). Military vehicles and soldiers dressed in Soviet Army uniforms marched on Khreschatyk Street and through Maidan Nezalezhnosti. Inspecting the parade was the Chief of the General Staff of the Armed Forces General of the Army Ivan Svyda while the commander of the Ukrainian Ground Forces, Colonel General Henadii Vorobiov commanded the parade. The decree for holding the parade was signed on 23 March of that year. The President of Ukraine Viktor Yanukovych delivered a jubilee address in his position as Supreme Commander. 2,500 members of the Ukrainian Armed Forces as well as troops from Russia and Belarus (the former being represented by the 45th Guards Spetsnaz Brigade taking part in a joint contingent with the Ukrainian Hetman Bohdan Khmelnytsky Independent Presidential Guard Regiment) took part in the parade. 17 military bands took part in the parade under the command of the Chief of the Military Music Department of the General Staff of the Ukrainian Armed Forces, Major General Volodymyr Derkach.

== Full order of march past ==
- Historical Contingent
  - First part
    - Colors Party composed of the Flag of Ukraine and the Victory Banner
    - Kyiv Presidential Honor Guard Battalion
    - Historical colors
    - Front Standard bearers
  - Second part
    - Vehicles of the Soviet Armed Forces (led by the Ukrainian-made T-34)
    - Red Army Infantry
    - Armoured Forces of the Red Army
    - Soviet Air Forces
    - Soviet Navy
    - Partisans
    - Red Army Female personnel
- Corps of Drums, Ivan Bohun Military High School
- Tri-Service Colour Guard
- Composite Russian-Ukrainian contingent
  - Hetman Bohdan Khmelnytsky Independent Presidential Guard Regiment
  - 45th Guards Spetsnaz Brigade
- Military Academy of Belarus
- National Defense University
- 95th Air Assault Brigade
- Military Institute of Telecommunications and Information Technologies
- 15th Transport Aviation Brigade
- Koroliov Military Institute (National Aviation University)
- Ivan Kozhedub National Air Force University
- 36th Separate Marine Brigade of the Ukrainian Naval Infantry
- National Security Service Academy
- National Academy of Internal Affairs
- 21st Brigade of the Internal Troops of Ukraine
- Kharkiv National Civil Defense University, State Emergency Service of Ukraine

== Other jubilee parades ==
The Kyiv parade was the center of the 65th anniversary celebrations, with 2,000 military personnel and about 100 units of military equipment were brought to celebrate Victory Day with parades in other Ukrainian cities. 1,040 Russian troops took part in the parades in four Ukrainian cities: Sevastopol, Kerch, Odesa and Mykolaiv. In turn, 75 cadets from the Hetman Petro Sahaidachnyi National Ground Forces Academy participated in the Moscow Victory Day Parade on Red Square.

== Gallery ==
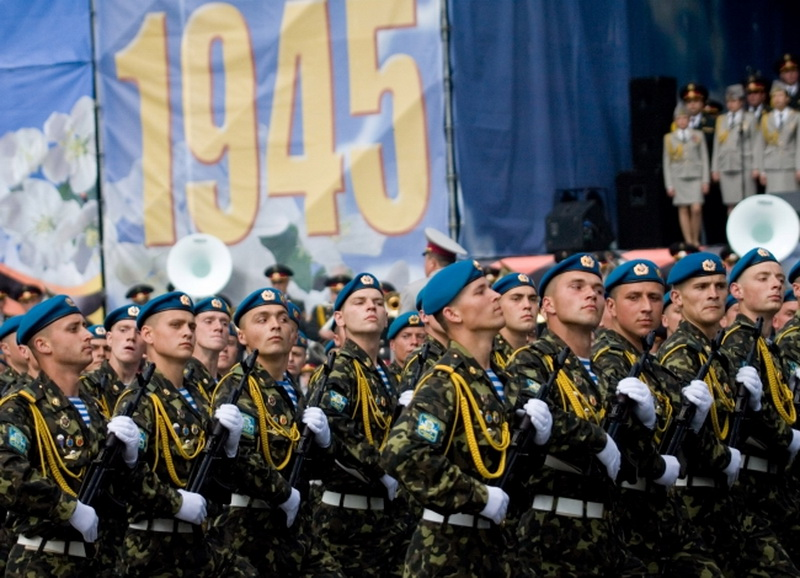
Ukrainian paratroopers

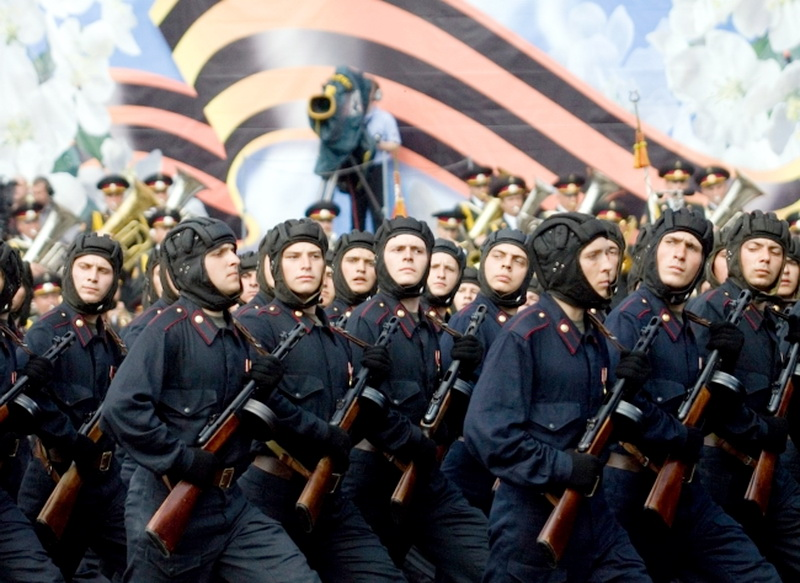
Soviet tank soldiers

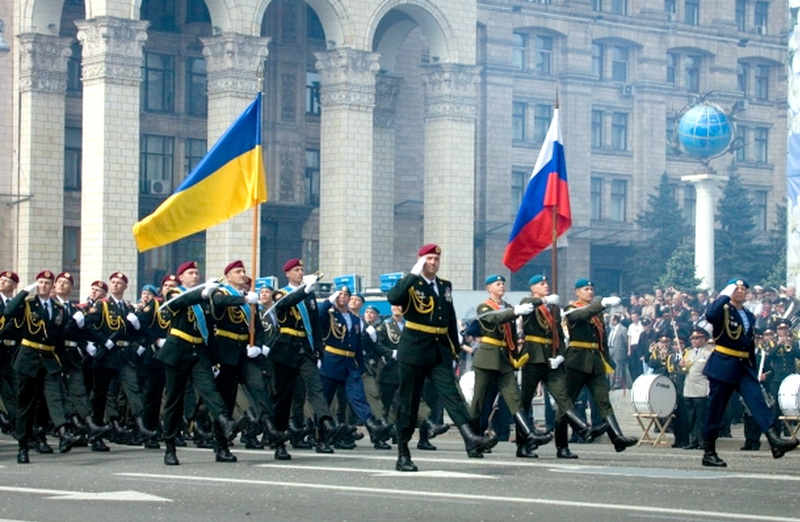
Personnel of the Independent Presidential Regiment marching with a unit from the Russian Airborne Troops on Maidan Nezalezhnosti during the parade.

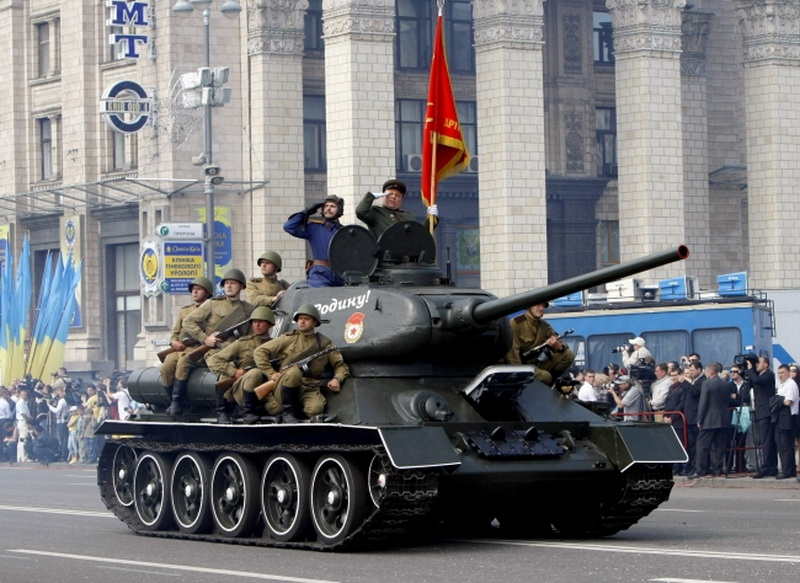
Historical troops on the T-34 tank.

== See also ==
- 2010 Moscow Victory Day Parade
- 2010 Minsk Victory Day Parade
