= Volodymyr Derkach =

Military director and musician

Major General Volodymyr Derkach People's Artist of Ukraine
- Володимир Деркач
- Born: January 1, 1957 (age 69); Yabluchne, Velyka Pysarivka Raion, Ukrainian SSR, Soviet Union
- Military career
- Allegiance: USSR; Ukraine
- Branch: Soviet Armed Forces; Ukrainian Armed Forces
- Service years: 1977–2011
- Rank: Major General
- Commands: Military Music Department of the General Staff of the Ukrainian Armed Forces (1995–2011)
- Awards: People's Artist of Ukraine

Major General Volodymyr Fedorovych Derkach (Ukrainian: Володимир Федорович Деркач) is a retired Ukrainian musician who worked for the Ukrainian Armed Forces. His last post he served in was as the Senior Military Director of the Military Music Department of the General Staff of the Ukrainian Armed Forces (MMD-GSAFU). He also served concurrently as the director of the National Exemplary Band of the Armed Forces of Ukraine.

== Professional career ==
Derkach was born in the village of Yabluchne, of the Velyka Pysarivka Raion of the Ukrainian SSR. He started his musical career in 1977, after he graduated from his trumpet class at the Sumy Music College. From then on, Derkach began to serve as a musician of the Soviet Armed Forces, first serving in the 14th Band of the Kyiv Military District. After studying at the Moscow Conservatory, he immediately rose through the Army's ranks, becoming the conductor of the HQ Band of the Odessa Military District in 1986. He would serve in Odessa for 6 more years in another position before becoming in 1992, the Deputy Chief of the Military Band Service. In 1995, he was promoted to director of music of the MMD-GSAFU. In that same year, he would command the massed bands the during his first major event, the parade for the golden jubilee of the Great Patriotic War held on Maidan Nezalezhnosti and Khreshchatyk. Later on, in the early 2000s, he served as a professor in the Kyiv National University of Culture and Arts. He was dismissed from his post in 2011 and was succeeded by Colonel Viktor Pashchenko.

== Legacy ==
During his tenure, he played a major role in the reformation of the military bands from the Soviet era and was considered to be responsible for the post-1991 Ukrainiazation of domestic military music, slowly replacing old Soviet marches like the Slow March of the Red Army with the Slow March of the Ukrainian Army or Farewell of Slavianka with the Zaporizhian March. He also worked to make Ukrainian military music distinct from Russian style music, such as including timpanists in the massed bands. Among his more notable parade events were the 2001 Kyiv Independence Day Parade, the 60th Anniversary of the Liberation of Ukraine in 2004 and the 2010 Kyiv Victory Day Parade. He founded of the Trumpets of Ukraine (until 2009, Trumpets of the Constitution) International Festival of Military Orchestras in Sumy in 2001.

== See also ==
- Military Music Department of the General Staff of the Ukrainian Armed Forces
- Moscow Conservatory
- Ukrainian Armed Forces
- 2010 Kyiv Victory Day Parade
