= Volodymyr Dashkovsky =

Ukrainian military musician/director (born 1965)

Colonel Volodymyr Dashkovsky People's Artist of Ukraine
- (Ukrainian): Володимир Анатолійович Дашковський
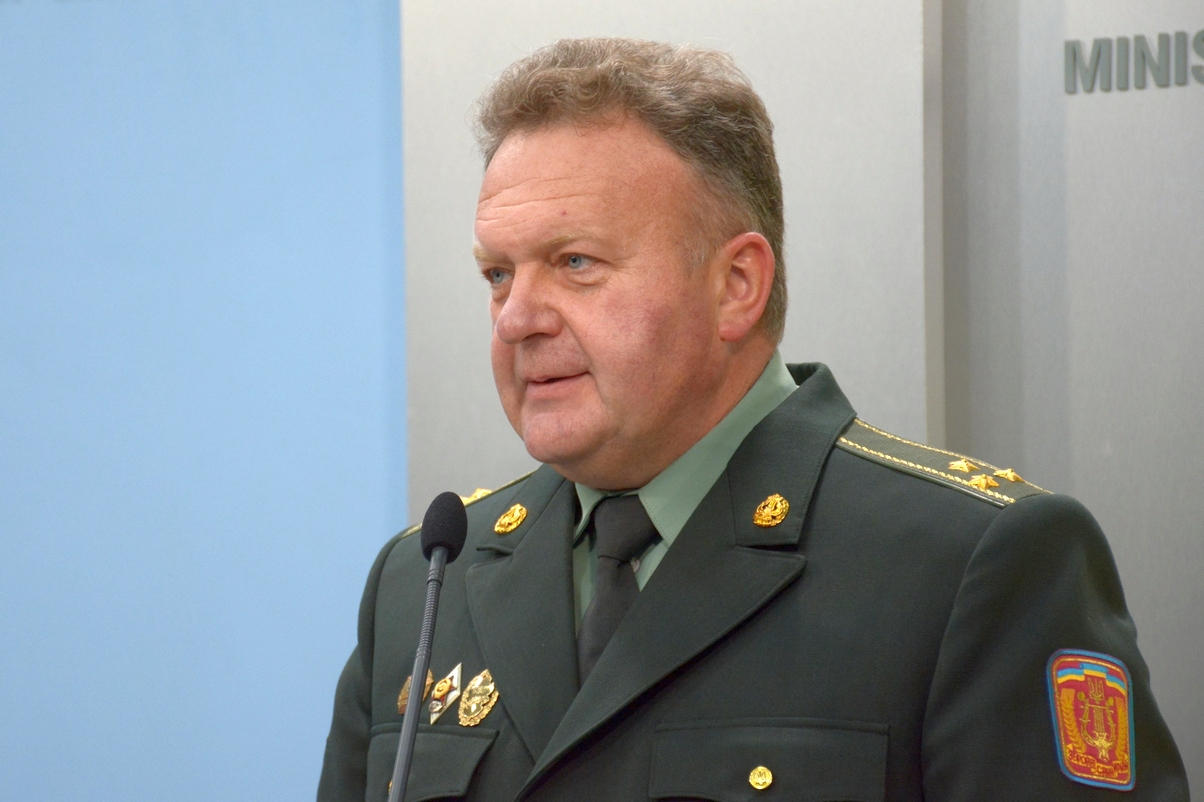
- Dashkovsky in 2016
- Born: Volodymyr Anatolievich Dashkovsky; 9 March 1965 (age 61); Cherkasy, Ukrainian SSR, Soviet Union
- Education: Moscow Conservatory
- Military career
- Allegiance: USSR; Ukraine
- Branch: Ukrainian Armed Forces
- Service years: 1987-2023
- Rank: Colonel, military conductor
- Commands: Senior Military Director of the Military Music Department of the General Staff of the Ukrainian Armed Forces
- Awards: Honored Artist of Ukraine; People's Artist of Ukraine

Colonel Volodymyr Anatolievich Dashkovsky (Ukrainian: Володимир Анатолійович Дашковський) also known as Vladimir Dashkovsky is a Ukrainian military conductor and composer who was the Senior Military Director of the Military Music Department of the General Staff of the Ukrainian Armed Forces (MMD-GSAFU) based in Kyiv.

== Biography ==
Dashkovsky was born in the city of Cherkasy, in the central part of the Ukrainian SSR in early 1965. In 1987, he graduated with honors from the Moscow Conservatory in the RSFSR and afterwards, returned to Ukraine to conduct in the military bands Kyiv Military District until 1993. Once the KVO was disbanded, he conducted military bands in the Odesa Military District for 5 years until 1998. Upon his removal from the OVO, he formed the 7th Military Headquarters Band of the Northern Operational Command in Chernihiv, which would later become the Military Music Center of the Ukrainian Ground Forces in 2003. He quickly rose through the ranks of the department in the years after, before being appointed the Director of Music of the Military Music Department of the General Staff of the Ukrainian Armed Forces, a position he served in from 2014-2023. During that period, he conducted the massed bands of the MMD-GSAFU during the Kyiv Independence Day Parades on Maidan Nezalezhnosti.

== Titles ==
- Honored Artist of Ukraine (1999)
- People's Artist of Ukraine (12 January 2009)

== See also ==
- Military Music Department of the General Staff of the Ukrainian Armed Forces
- Moscow Conservatory
- Ukrainian Armed Forces
