= Ukrainian Navy Band =

Naval unit band in the Ukrainian Armed Forces

Ukrainian Navy Band Оркестр Війсково-морських сил України
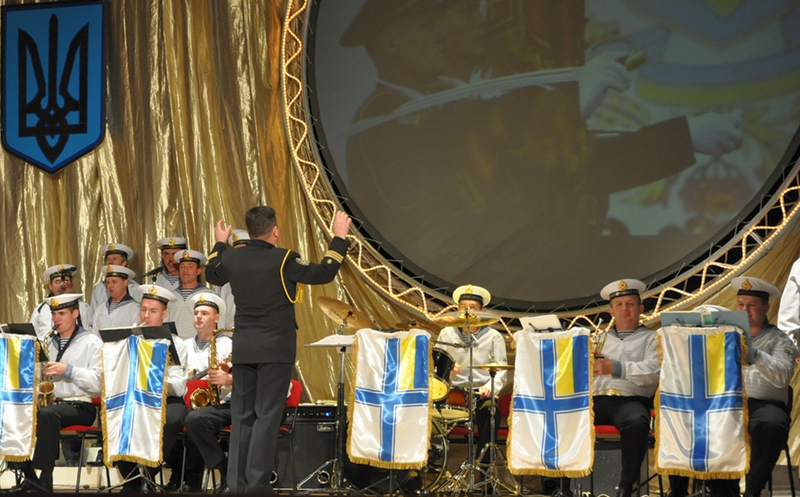
- Members of the Ukrainian Navy Band
- Active: February 18, 1993
- Country: Ukraine
- Branch: Navy
- Type: Military band
- Size: 54
- Garrison/HQ: Sevastopol (until 2014); Odesa (2014-Present)

Commanders
- Senior Military Director and Artistic Director: 2nd Rank Captain Valerij Kostyannikov
- Bandmaster: Senior Lieutenant Oleg Misnyankin

Insignia
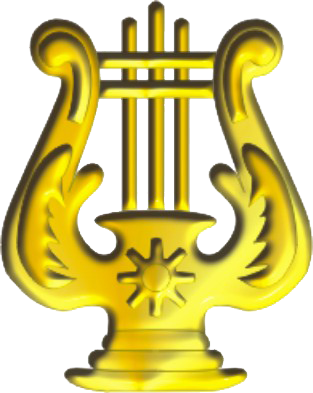
- Collar insignia

The Headquarters Band of the Military Music Center of the Ukrainian Naval Forces (Ukrainian: Центр військово-музичного мистецтва Військово-Морських Сил Збройних Сил України), also known as the Ukrainian Navy Band (Ukrainian: Оркестр Військово-морських сил України) is a Ukrainian military band based in Sevastopol. It was founded on February 18, 1993. The Band can perform any musician genre composition. It is a part of the Military Music Department of the General Staff of the Ukrainian Armed Forces.

The Navy Band Chief and music director, Honored Culture Worker of Autonomous Republic of Crimea, is 2nd Rank Captain Valerij L. Kostyannikov. The Bandmaster is Senior Lieutenant Oleg A. Misnyankin.

During its existence, the band has toured many countries, including Germany, the Netherlands, and Turkey.

Following the Russian invasion of Crimea, members of the band like all other Ukrainian Navy personnel in Crimea were given the choice to join the Russian Navy, leave for Ukraine, or retire with no benefits. The band has been able to be continued in the navy of Ukraine.

In 2025, they performed at the Royal Edinburgh Military Tattoo.
