= Band of the Hetman Petro Sahaidachnyi National Ground Forces Academy =

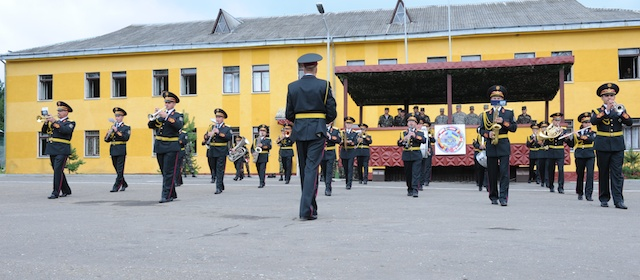
The band performing during the Rapid Trident 2012 opening ceremony held at the International Peacekeeping and Security Center.

The Band of the Hetman Petro Sahaidachnyi National Ground Forces Academy (Ukrainian: Оркестр національної академії сухопутних військ імені гетьмана Петра Сагайдачного) is the official school military band in the Ukrainian Ground Forces. Its purpose is to promote the patriotic, cultural and aesthetic education of the Ground Forces personnel to the Ukrainian people domestically and to people abroad. In that purpose, it is part of the Military Music Department of the General Staff of the Ukrainian Armed Forces, which acts as the official service of military bands in the Armed Forces of Ukraine.

The band was created in November 1942 in Stalingrad. During the Second World War, the band traveled across Europe along with the Red Army, passing through the roads of the Soviet Union to the streets of Prague. In 1946, one year after the war ended, it was divided into the Headquarters Band of the Carpathian Military District and the Carpathian Military Ensemble. Its travels have extended from the Carpathian Mountains to the Pacific coast of the RSFSR, with the band having taken part in events that range from performing for Soviet Army troops in Afghanistan as well as performing in the aftermath of Chernobyl tragedy (directly in the exclusion zone).

With the establishment of the new Ground Forces Academy, the band was moved to serve as its academic school band. It currently consists of the following ensembles:

- Parade Band
- Concert Band
- Choreographic group
- Vocal group and soloists
- Folk group

Today, the band provides musical accompaniment to ceremonial events at the academy and for servicemen and their families of the armed forces and the Lviv Garrison. It also takes part in many community events. The Band of the Military Conductor's Department was founded in 1993. Making it unique was the ability for a member of the band to become a future military conductor in a military band.
