= Military Music Center of the Ukrainian Air Force =

- Військово-музичний центр мистецтва повітряних сил Збройних Сил України
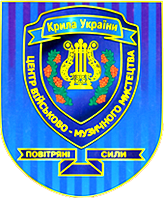
- Active: November 1, 2005 - present
- Country: Ukraine
- Branch: Armed Forces of Ukraine
- Type: Military Band
- Garrison/HQ: Vinnytsia

Commanders
- Notable commanders: Valerii Novosad

The Military Music Center of the Ukrainian Air Force serves as the official Military band service of the Ukrainian Air Force. It is a part of the Military Music Department of the General Staff of the Ukrainian Armed Forces.

== Background ==
The Military Music Center of the Ukrainian Air Force was created on November 1, 2005, in accordance with a directive by defense minister Anatoliy Hrytsenko made in early October of that year. The center consisted of the Ukrainian Air Force Band and the Kryliya Kozytsia Country Song and Dance Ensemble. Valerii Novosad, an Honored Artist of Ukraine, was appointed the first head of the center. The Center for Military-Musical Arts of the Air Force of Ukraine was formed on July 1, 2006, on the basis of the Band of the Air Force based in Vinnitsa. During seven years of existence, the collective repeatedly participated in festivals both in Ukraine and abroad, duly representing the country in military tattoos in Europe. During its existence, the center has accompanied and held a large number of concerts and festivities in the military units of the Air Forces and in the broader structure of the Armed Forces of Ukraine.

== Composition ==
The MMC-UAF is headquartered in Vinnytsia and is designed to organize, train and maintain bands in the Ukrainian Air Force. The Headquarters Band of the Military Music Center Ukrainian Air Force is the main band of the music center, and which is organized into the following units:

- HQ Marching Band
- Concert Band
- Big Band
- Jazz and Pop ensembles
- Symphony Orchestra
- Song and Dance Ensemble
- Choir

=== Marching Band ===
The formation of the team took place in November 1997 in the city of Vinnytsia on the basis of the Command of the Air Force of Ukraine. The concert and performance of the orchestra is to provide official ceremonies at the state level, festive events in the Air Force parts, as well as in Vinnytsia and Vinnytsia regions, participate in military parades, presenting the best examples of Ukrainian art at international and national festivals.

During the years of its existence, the team has repeatedly participated in festivals both in Ukraine and abroad, representing our country in the cities of Germany, France, and Libya. Military musicians are laureates of the All-Ukrainian festivals "Surmi of Ukraine" and "Surmi of Podillya". Major Shkuropat Oleg Anatolievich has been appointed as the Chief of the Orchestra since 2011.

=== Choir ===
In February 1965, on the basis of the 43rd Missile Army, a concert ensemble was formed, which would in 1994 be put under the command of the Ukrainian Air Force. Since then, the choir has been the main vocal ensemble of the air force, serving in the music center since December 2004.

== Links ==
- Official Website
