= Band of the Kyiv Presidential Honor Guard Battalion =

Ukrainian unit band

- Оркестр почесної варти президентського полку
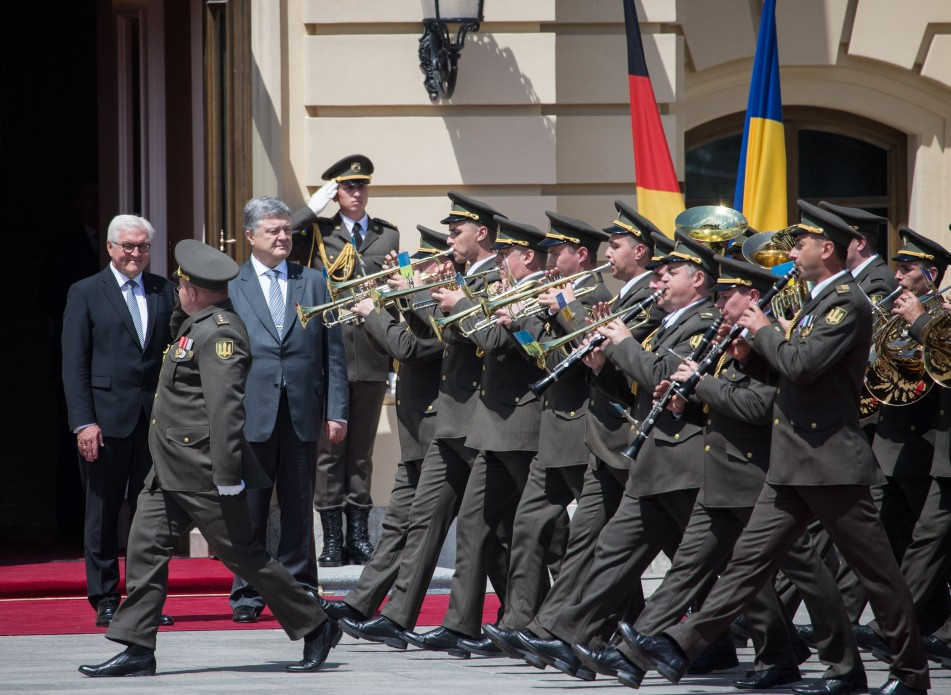
- Active: March 10, 1992 – present
- Country: Ukraine
- Branch: Ukrainian Ground Forces
- Type: Military Band
- Size: 74
- Part of: Military Music Department of the General Staff of the Ukrainian Armed Forces
- Garrison/HQ: Kyiv
- Website: opov.voice.kiev.ua

Commanders
- Director of Music: Lieutenant Colonel Roman Veligorsky

Insignia
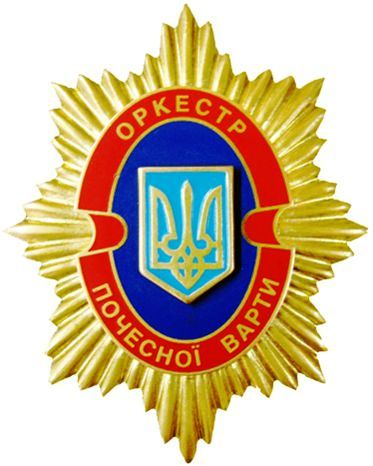
- Identification symbol

Band of the Kyiv Presidential Honor Guard Battalion is a military unit that performs military music with the Kyiv Presidential Honor Guard Battalion. The band is part of the Military Music Department of the General Staff of the Ukrainian Armed Forces. The orchestra of Presidential Guard was created to provide musical accompaniment during official ceremonies involving the President of Ukraine, the Chairman of The Verkhovna Rada of Ukraine, the Prime Minister of Ukraine, the Minister of Defense of Ukraine, and delegations of foreign states.

== History ==
On March 10, 1992, the Band of the Guard of Honor of the Ministry of Defense of Ukraine was formed with 67 servicemen originally in its ranks. On April 30, 1999, the orchestra was subordinated to the Chief of the Military Music Department of the General Staff of the Ukrainian Armed Forces. In the early 2000s, the orchestra was transferred to the separate special-purpose regiment of the Ministry of Defense of Ukraine. On August 28, 2003, the orchestra was transferred to the 1st Independent Guard Regiment of the President of Ukraine, becoming part of the Kyiv Presidential Honor Guard Battalion. That same day, the band renamed itself the Band of the Kyiv Presidential Honor Guard Battalion. From December 2015 to January 2016, the band was to Military Unit A0222.

The following is a list of directors:

- Colonel Ivan Moskalenko (1992–2000)
- Lieutenant Colonel Mykhailo Ryabokon (2000–2023)
- Lieutenant Colonel Roman Veligorsky (since 2023)

== Activities ==
The band takes part in many concerts and ceremonies in Ukraine. The musical unit is a usual participant in military parades and celebrations in honor of the Independence Day of Ukraine, Victory Day (9 May) and Liberation Day. The band performed in front of large audience in cities such as Kyiv, Chernivtsi and Kharkiv while also taking part in international festivals in the Netherlands (1993) and the Czech Republic (1998) as well as domestic festivals of military brass bands. In 2015, the orchestra was included in the massed bands during the finale of the annual Kyiv Independence Day Parade. When participating in festivals, it usually performs in the uniform if the honour guard battalion, as well as the uniform of the larger battalion (including the maroon beret).

=== Repertoire ===
The repertoire of the band are works of classical and contemporary composers, as well as various folklore and dance music. The band also has experience performing national anthems around the world (including the Ukrainian anthem, Shche ne vmerla Ukraina) and various military marches.

- March of the Cossacks – Anatoly Tkachuk
- March of the Honour Guard – M. Ryabokon
- For Honor, Glory!
- Zaporizhian March
- Slow March of the Ukrainian Army
- Slow March № 1
- Slow March № 3
- Velychalna – Oleksandr Kabachenko
- March of Hetman Bohdan Khmelnytsky – Mykola Lysenko
- March to the Glory of the Soviet People (Fanfare version) – S. Tvorun
- March on the theme of "Hey you, Sagittarius of Sichovyh"
- March of the 27th Kyiv Dragoons Regiment
- Solemn Fanfare
- Independence Fanfare

== Gallery ==
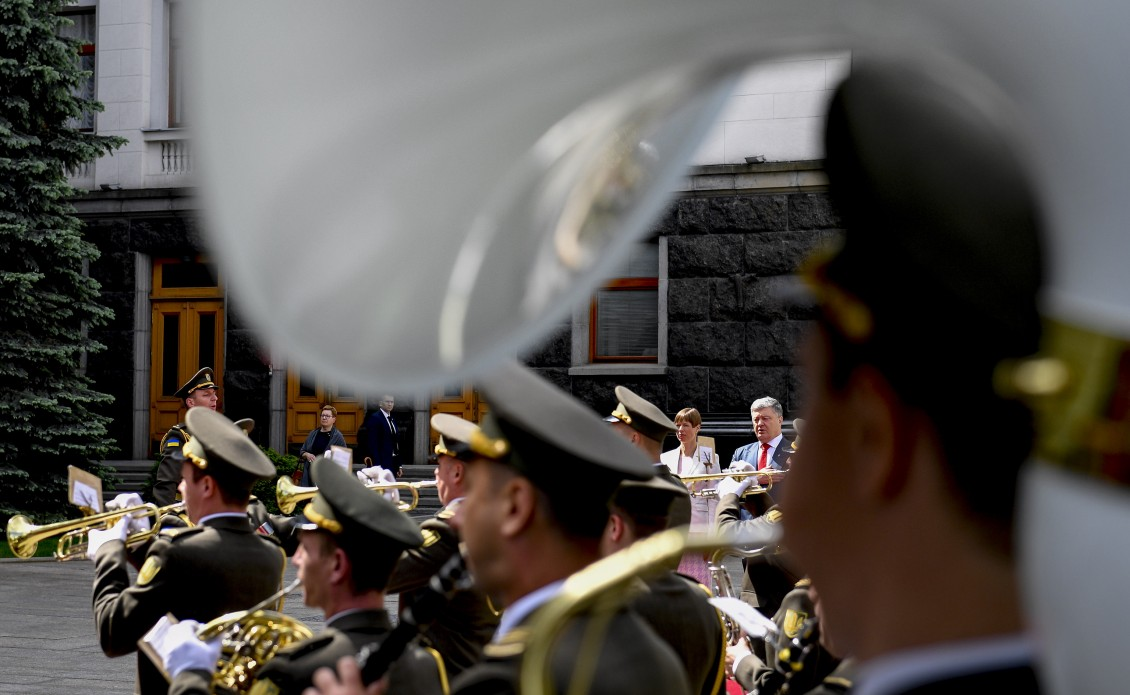

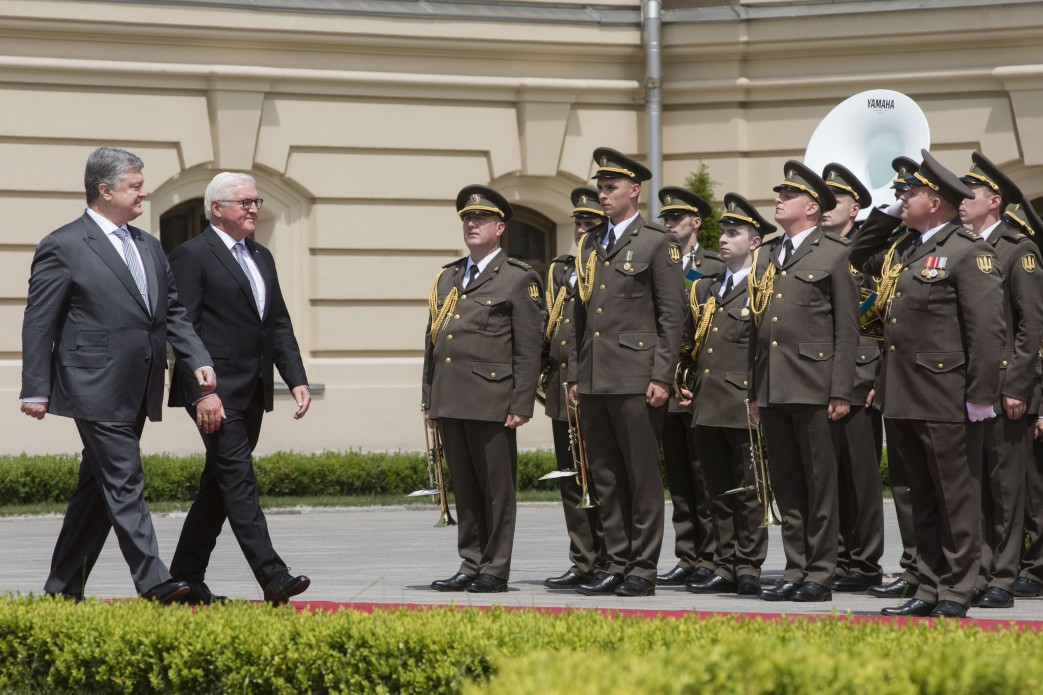

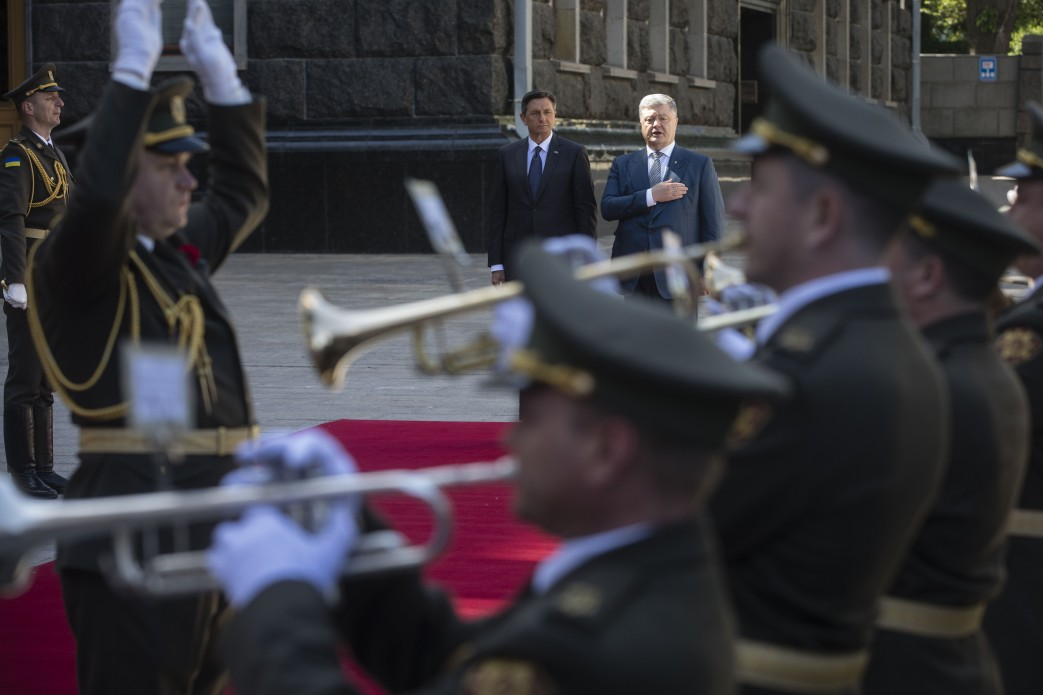

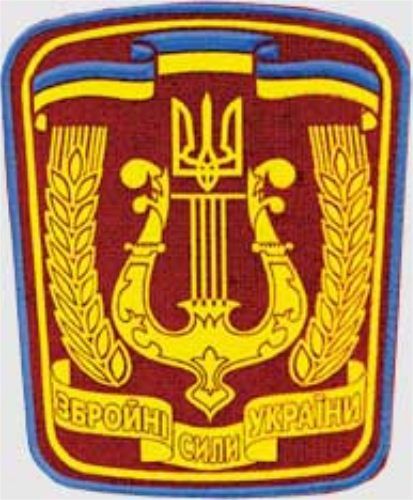
The shoulder patch of the orchestra.
