= Military Music Center of the Ukrainian Ground Forces =

- Військово-музичний центр Сухопутних військ Збройних Сил України
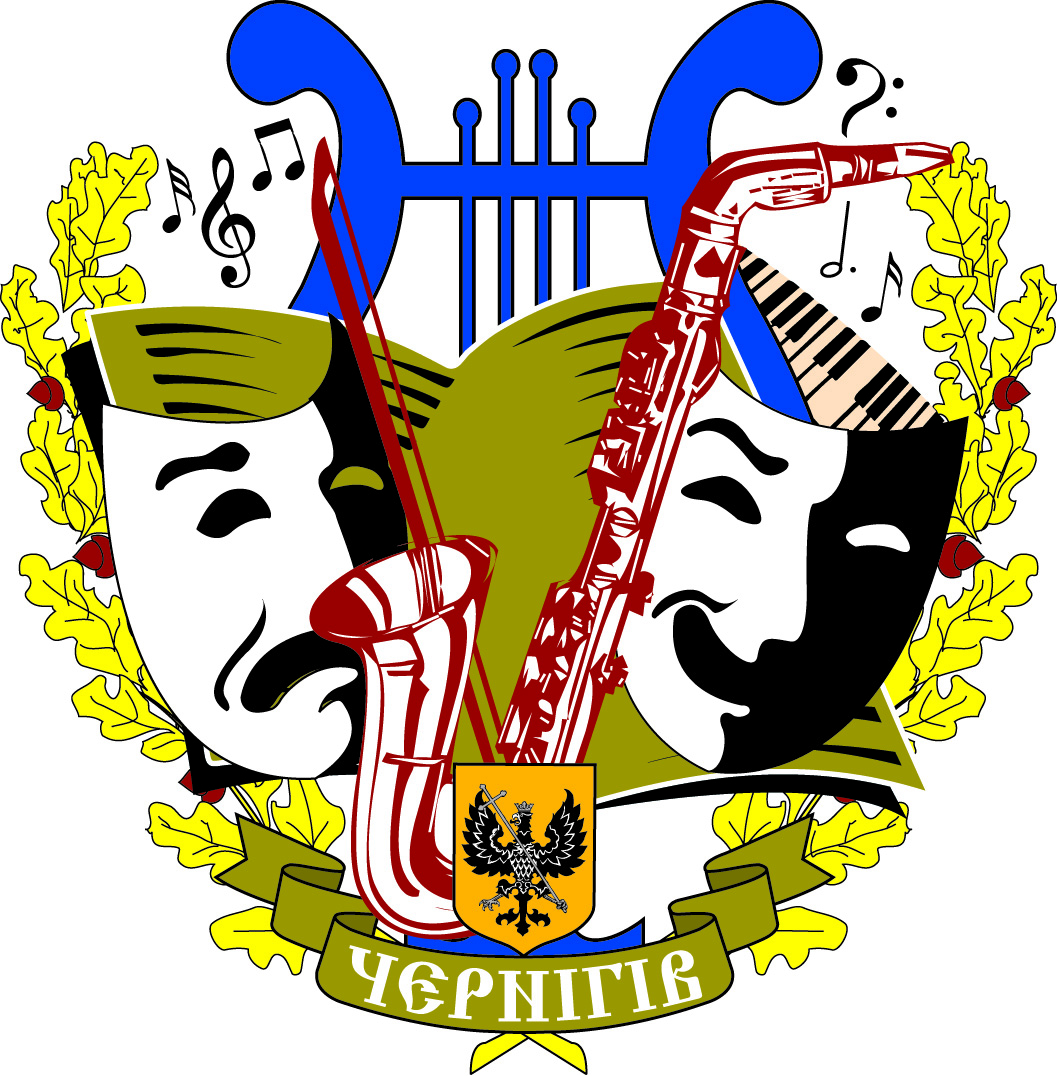
- Active: August 23, 2003 - present
- Country: Ukraine
- Branch: Ukrainian Ground Forces
- Type: Military Band
- Size: 75
- Part of: Military Music Department of the General Staff
- Garrison/HQ: Chernihiv

Commanders
- Current commander: Lieutenant Colonel Igor Bykovsky
- Notable commanders: Colonel Volodymyr Dashkovsky; Lieutenant Colonel Alexander Shevchuk

The Military Music Center of the Ukrainian Ground Forces serves as the official military band service of the Ukrainian Ground Forces. It is a part of the Military Music Department of the General Staff of the Ukrainian Armed Forces. he current head of the center is Lieutenant Colonel Alexander Shevchuk. Since July 2005, the Military Music Center has been located at the premises of the former House of Military Officers on Shevchenko Street.

It was founded on the basis of the 7th Military Headquarters Band of the Northern Operational Command in Chernihiv in 1998. It was moved to Kyiv and was reestablished as the Military Music Department of the General Staff by the directive of the Minister of Defense on August 23, 2003. The unit was based on the 8th Training Regiment of the Ministry of Defense of Ukraine. In 2013, Shevchuk received the title of "National Leader of Ukraine" at the Central House of Officers of the Armed Forces of Ukraine.

== Composition ==
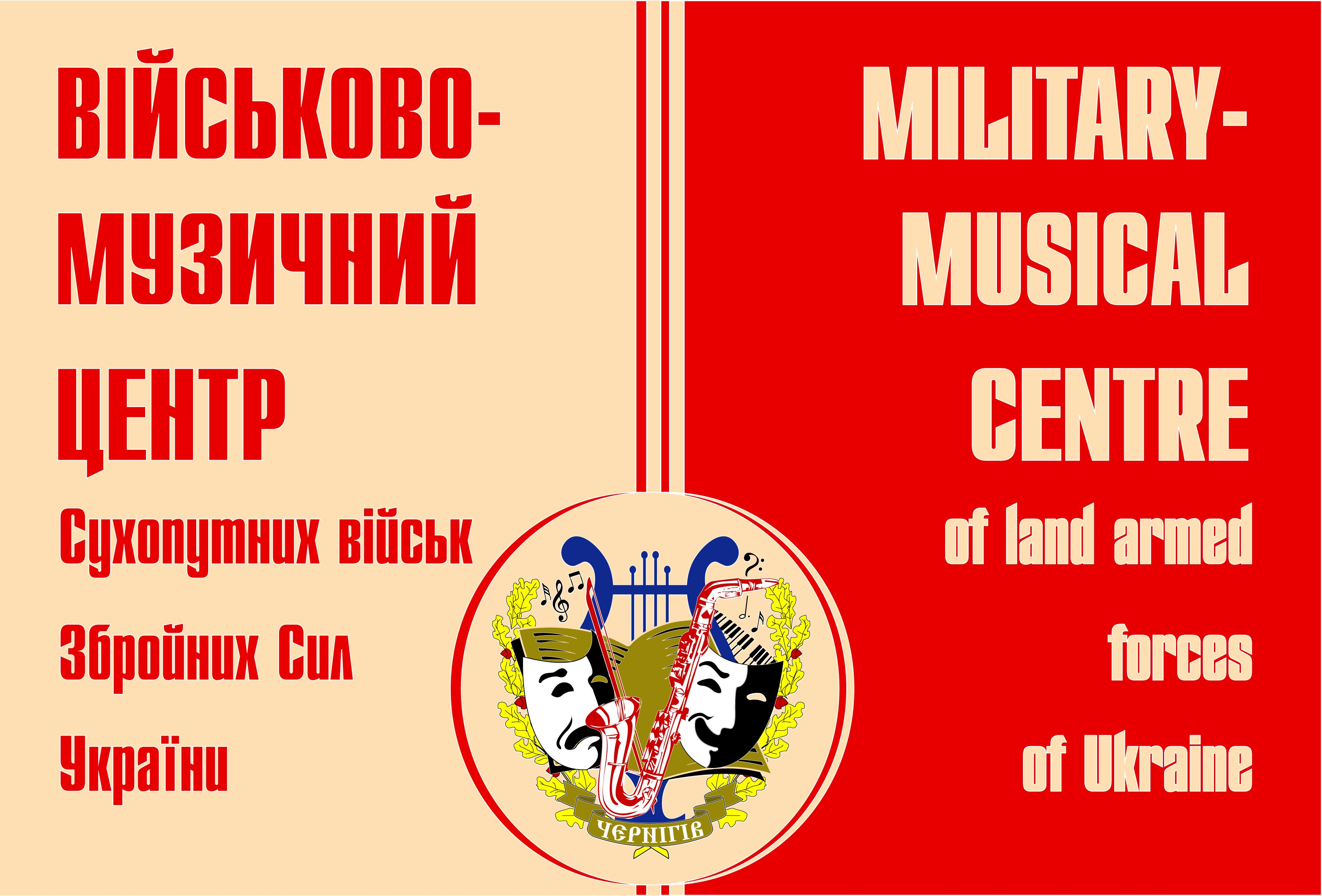
A banner of the center in Ukrainian and English.

The MMC-UGF is headquartered in Kyiv and its primary duty is to organize, train and maintain bands in the Ground Forces. The MMC-UGF's primary HQ band is the Headquarters Band of the Military Music Center Ukrainian Ground Forces, which is organized into:

- Big Band
- Jazz and Pop ensembles
- Symphony Orchestra
- Concert Band/Marching Band

The MMC-UGF is also responsible for the organization of military bands in each of the Operational Commands of the Ground Forces and subordinate units. There are three creative teams within the MMC-UGF:

- Military bands
- A chamber symphony orchestra;
- Representative Ensemble of the Ukrainian Ground Forces (composed of ballet and choir).

These creative groups also host 13 small forms of concert and creative activity:

- Brass band
- Chamber choir
- Chamber symphony orchestra
- Ballet group
- Big band
- Dixie band
- Chernihiv Brass Quintet
- Woodwind quartet
- Combo band;
- Vocal Studio
- Vocal jazz sextet
- Women's Quartet
- String Quartet

It is clear that this composition of small forms of concert and creative activity gives the opportunity to hold several concerts (performances of creative groups) in different places.

== Mission ==
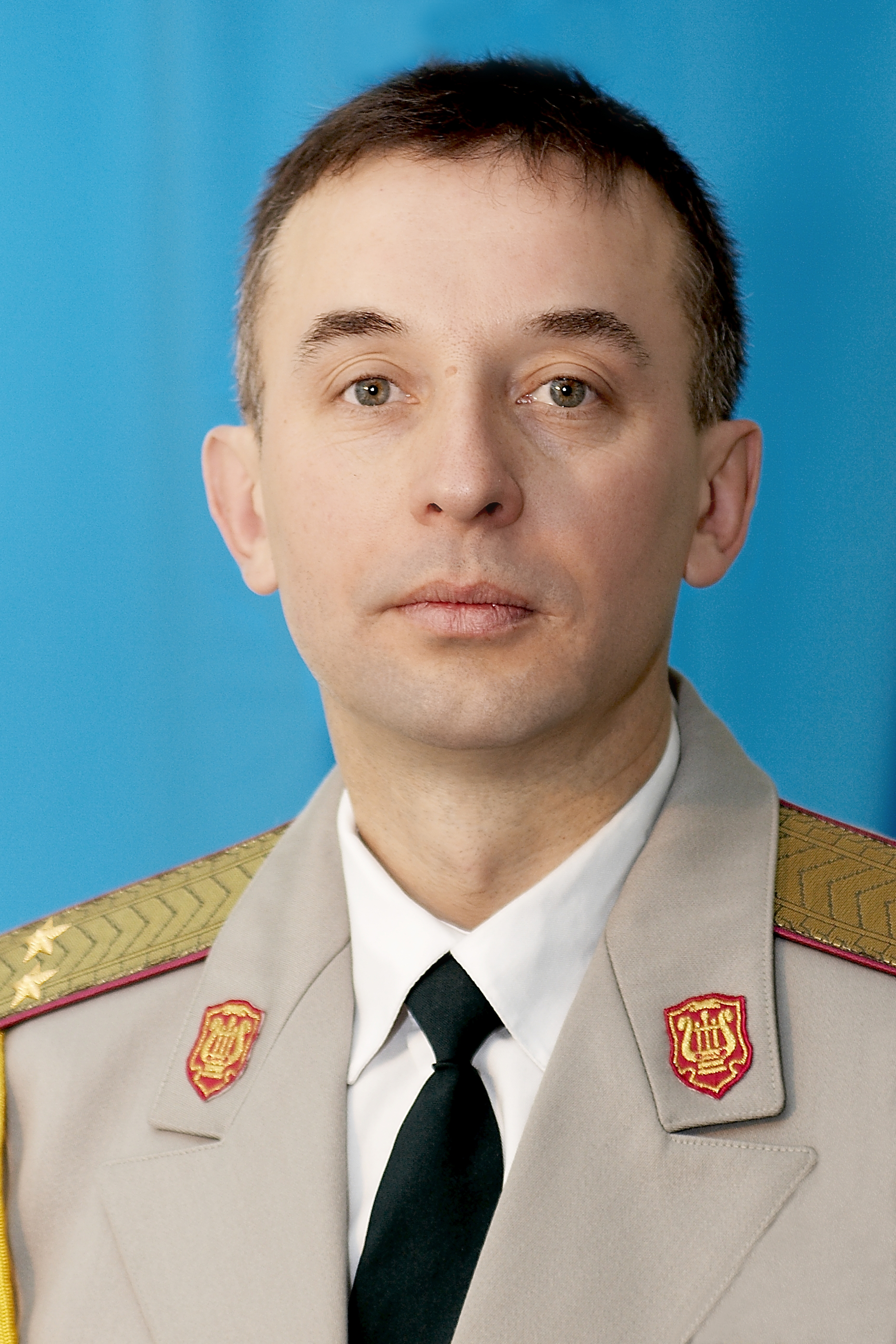
Alexander Shevchuk.

The Military Music Center organizes and implements:

- Concerts for servicemen and their families at military units, cultural and leisure centers, military educational institutions, institutions and organizations within the sphere of administration of the Ministry of Defense of Ukraine.
- Creative teams of the center take part in the musical provision of military parades, rituals, parade concerts, social-political, cultural-mass and sports events.
- Musical support for events dedicated to the solemn and significant dates in the history of the Ukrainian State and its Armed Forces.
- Organizing and holding of competitions and festivals of military patriotic and marching songs, festivals and competitions of military orchestras and song and dance ensembles, competitions for the creation of new compositions of national patriotic instruments, patriotic instruments arranging and arranging of musical and choral works for military orchestras and ensembles.
- Collaborate with creative unions, poets, composers, leading artists and cultural and art figures to write new works of military-patriotic direction.

The largest venue for the Military Music Center building is the large hall (200 seats), which holds regular celebrations for national holidays, veterans' gatherings of the Armed Forces of Ukraine, literary and concert evenings for servicemen and their families, as well as residents of the city. One of the main layers that is embedded in the repertoire plans of the creative teams of the center is the Ukrainian musical heritage and its popularization. An integral part of this work is the collaboration with composers and poets who are practically useless in these important areas: the patriotic, patriotic, military, and contemporary military lyrics. It has connections in the Academy of Arts of Ukraine and the National Music Academy of Ukraine.

=== Activities ===
Over the period of its existence, the Military Music Center has gained wide recognition as one of the most powerful and sophisticated professional music bands not only in Ukraine but also abroad. Its first major event was the 60th Anniversary of the Liberation of Ukraine, and has since been a participant in all parades in Kyiv on the anniversary of Ukraine's independence. During its concert-touring and methodical activities, the Center staff takes part in military parades and events with the participation of the President of Ukraine, the leadership of the state, the Ministry of Defense of Ukraine, and the Command of the Land Forces. In October 2005, it performed in Iraq during as part of a government delegation led by the Minister of Defense Anatoliy Hrytsenko. It took part in the first tour of the country's remote garrison bands in May 2007. During its existence, the Military Music Center has held more than 950 concert and construction events in the military units of the garrisons of the Armed Forces of Ukraine and in civilian organizations. The Military Music Center has participated in about 25 international festivals, programs, concerts.

The following trips were made by the band:

- Celebrations of the Tricentennial of the founding of St. Petersburg
- 60th anniversary of the liberation of the city of Bryansk
- In June–July 2008, the Military Band and Ballet Center participated in international festivals of military brass bands in France and Italy. During these trips, the creative staff of the center, in addition to celebrating the festivities, performed a solo program in the central squares, central concert venues and city halls.
- Under Shevchuk, Ukraine was represented at the IV Youth International Festival in Germany as conductor of the Youth Symphony Orchestra.
- The band was one of many to march on Maidan Nezalezhnosti during the celebrations of the 20th anniversary of Ukrainian independence.
