= Separate Presidential Brigade =

Ukrainian military unit

Presidential Brigade
- Окремий президентський бригади
- Shoulder Sleeve Insignia of the brigade
- Active: January 2, 1992 – Today
- Country: Ukraine
- Allegiance: Armed Forces of Ukraine
- Role: Mechanized Infantry
- Size: 1 Brigade (5 battalions)
- Part of: 12th Army Corps
- Garrison/HQ: Kyiv, Kyiv Oblast
- Patron: Bohdan Khmelnytsky
- Mottos: Order, Discipline, Organization
- Anniversaries: 2 January
- Engagements: Russo-Ukrainian war; 2022 Russian invasion of Ukraine
- Website: https://www.facebook.com/Prezydentska.Bryhada

Commanders
- Current commander: Pavlo Hora

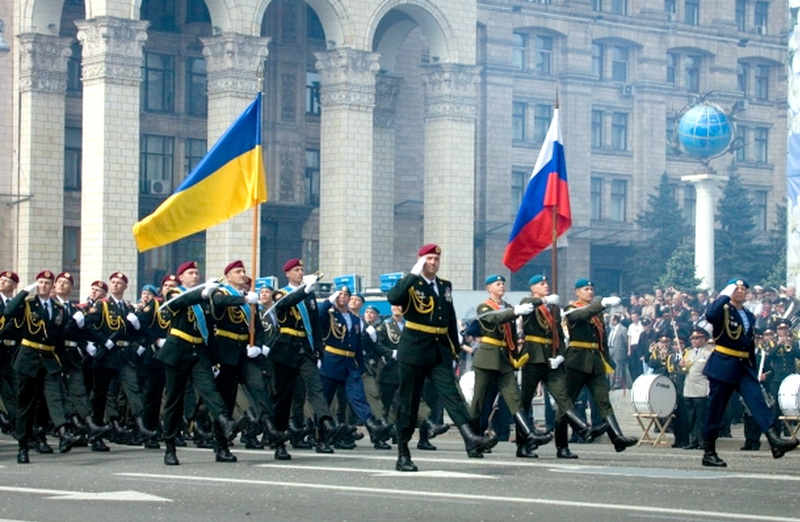
Personnel of the Presidential Regiment marching with a unit from the Russian Airborne Troops at the 9 May 2010 parade in Kyiv

The Presidential Brigade "Hetman Bohdan Khmelnytskyi" (Ukrainian: Окрема президентська бригада імені гетьмана Богдана Хмельницького, romanized: Okrema prezydentska bryhada imeni hetmana Bohdana Khmelnytskoho) is a special military unit of Ukraine and its Armed Forces which is mandated to defend the president of Ukraine in his duty as Supreme Commander-in-chief of the Armed Forces, the First Family, and the presidential residences and facilities assigned to the presidential office.

== History ==
=== Under the National Guard ===
By order of the National Guard on January 2, 1992, on the basis of the personnel of the 290th independent motorized rifle Novorossiysk Red Banner Lenin Komsomol special operational-purpose regiment of the Internal Troops of the MVD of the USSR, the brigade was formed as the 1st National Guard Infantry Regiment (military unit 4101) in Kyiv, in the 1st (Kyiv) Operational Division of the National Guard (military unit 2210). In 1995, the regiment was reflagged as an infantry brigade.

The 24th independent brigade of the NGU was renamed the 24th National Guard Special Purpose Brigade by order of the KNGU on December 24, 1998. By Decree of the President of Ukraine dated October 30, 1999, the 24th Brigade was awarded the honorary title "Kyiv" for the merits of personnel in tasks ensuring public order in Ukraine's capital.

=== Transfer to the armed forces ===
The 24th separate Kyiv brigade of special purpose National Guard of Ukraine was transferred to the Armed Forces of Ukraine by Decree of the President of Ukraine on December 17, 1999 while the National Guard itself would later be disbanded under Ukrainian law on January 11, 2000. The headquarters of the 24th separate Kyiv brigade were converted into the headquarters of the president of Ukraine's Independent Novorossiysk-Kyiv Order of the Red Banner Special Purpose Infantry Regiment (MU A0222) – attached to the Ukrainian Ground Forces. The 2nd and 17th independent battalions of special purpose National Guard of Ukraine were merged into this formation's linear battalions of special purpose, and the 3rd separate battalion of special purpose National Guard of Ukraine was disbanded. The 27th special battalion of special purpose NGU was transferred to the Internal Troops of Ukraine's Ministry of Internal Affairs and became a linear battalion of the 10th Special Motorized Regiment of Internal Troops of Ukraine.

=== Further development ===
Brigade beret insignia

To commemorate Ukraine's tenth anniversary of independence, the Kyiv Presidential Honor Guard Battalion was incorporated into the regimental Order of Battle as the new 3rd Battalion in 2001. The regiment's name was changed to the Independent Kyiv Regiment of the President of Ukraine by Decree of the President of Ukraine No. 646/2015 in 2015, and it was removed from the Order of the Red Banner. On December 15, 2017, President Petro Poroshenko bestowed the honorific "Hetman Bohdan Khmelnytsky" on the regiment and presented its new regimental battle colors in a Presentation of Colours ceremony, giving the regiment its full name of Independent Presidential Regiment "Hetman Bohdan Khmelnytskyi". The ceremony took place on the centennial anniversary of the Council of People's Commissars and the People's Secretariat's ultimatum to the government of the Ukrainian People's Republic, which signaled the start of the Soviet war in Ukraine in 1917, and marked the end of the regiment's silver jubilee.

On Independence Day 2018, a copy of the regimental guidon of the 1st Ukrainian Infantry Regiment "Bohdan Khmelnytsky", I Ukrainian Corps (which fought in the Ukrainian War of Independence and was the first ever infantry regiment established in the Ukrainian People's Army at that time) was paraded past dignitaries by the regiment's Honor Guard Battalion, confirming the regiment's inheritance of the lineage and traditions of said regiment.

=== Russian invasion of Ukraine ===
To commemorate its 30th anniversary, the regiment was upgraded once more to a full brigade in 2022. As a result, two new battalions were added to the brigade's expanded order of battle, joined by a growing number of further battalions in the months following. The new raisings have made the brigade one of the largest in the Ukrainian Ground Forces.

The 210th Special Purpose Infantry Battalion used body cameras to film the 2024 BBC documentary Enemy in the Woods, in which they keep the Russians from seizing Kupiansk's railroads and using them to attack Kharkiv and Kyiv.

At least the 21st battalion of the brigade was deployed in Donetsk Oblast in April 2024 to slow down the Russian offensive there. In September, two of its members explained to the Financial Times that Russian attack tactics had evolved to use smaller infantry units, less vulnerable to drones, and that the Ukrainians could do little against Russian glide bombs.

== Structure ==
Italian donated Puma of the Brigade

As of 2024, the brigade's structure is as follows:

Independent Presidential Brigade, Kyiv

- Brigade Headquarters and Headquarters Company
  - 1st Special Purpose (Guards) Battalion
  - 2nd Special Purpose (Guards) Battalion
  - 1st Mechanized Infantry (Guards) Battalion
  - 2nd Mechanized Infantry (Guards) Battalion
  - 3rd Mechanized Infantry (Guards) Battalion
    - UAV Unit "Bulava" (Wild Hornets night drones)
  - 4th Mechanized Infantry (Guards) Battalion
    - UAV Unit "Pikachu"
  - 20th Special Purpose (Guards) Battalion
  - 21st Special Purpose (Guards) Battalion
  - 21st Separate Special Forces Battalion
  - 22nd Special Purpose (Guards) Battalion
  - 23rd Special Purpose (Guards) Battalion "Legion D"
  - 210th "Berlingo" Special Purpose (Guards) Battalion
  - Kyiv Presidential Honor Guard Battalion
    - Band of the Kyiv Presidential Honor Guard Battalion
  - 1st Tank (Guards) Battalion (under formation)
  - Field Artillery Regiment
    - Headquarters and Target Acquisition Battery
    - Reconnaissance Battery
    - Observer Battery
    - 1st Field Artillery Battalion (Self-Propelled)
    - 2nd Field Artillery Battalion (Self-Propelled)
    - MLRS Battalion (under formation)
    - Anti-tank Artillery Battalion (under formation)
  - Air Defense Artillery Regiment (under planning stage)
  - Reconnaissance Company
  - Attack Drone Company "NOVA"
  - Sniper Company "Phantom"
  - Special Operations Company (Guards)
  - Military Police Company (Provost)
  - Combat Engineer Company
  - Signals Company

== Command ==
- Colonel Viktor Didenko (2000–02)
- Colonel Mykola Rohovskyi (2002–04)
- Colonel Ihor Plahuta (2004–08)
- Colonel Viktor Plakhtiy (2008–12)
- Colonel Serhii Klyavlin (2012–18)
- Colonel Oleksandr Bakulin (2018–22)
- Colonel Pavlo Hora (2022–)

== See also ==
- 101st Armed Forces of Ukraine General Staff Protection Brigade
