= National Exemplary Band of the Armed Forces of Ukraine =

Military Band

National Exemplary Band of the Armed Forces of Ukraine Зразково-показовий оркестр Збройних Сил України
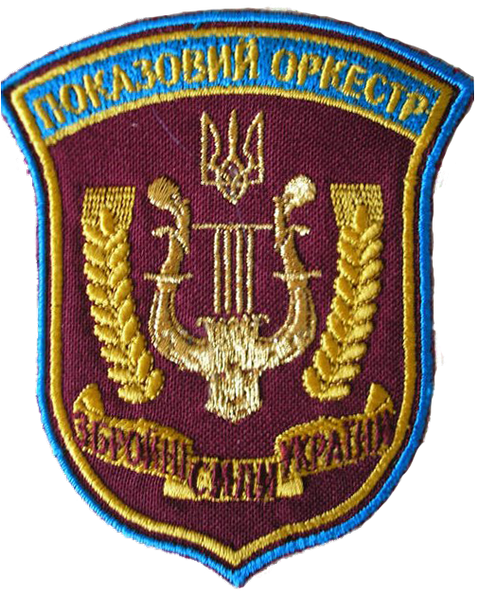
- The emblem of the band

Background information
- Also known as: ЗПоЗСУ
- Origin: Kiev, Ukrainian SSR, Soviet Union
- Years active: 1945–present
- Past members: Volodymyr Oberenko; Andriy Kondratyuk
- Website: zpo.org.ua

The National Exemplary Band of the Armed Forces of Ukraine (Ukrainian: Зразково-показовий оркестр Збройних Сил України [ЗПоЗСУ], lit. 'Exemplary and Demonstration Orchestra of the Armed Forces of Ukraine') is a 100-member military brass band of the Ukrainian Armed Forces. It serves under the direct administration of the Military Music Department of the General Staff of the Ukrainian Armed Forces.

== History ==
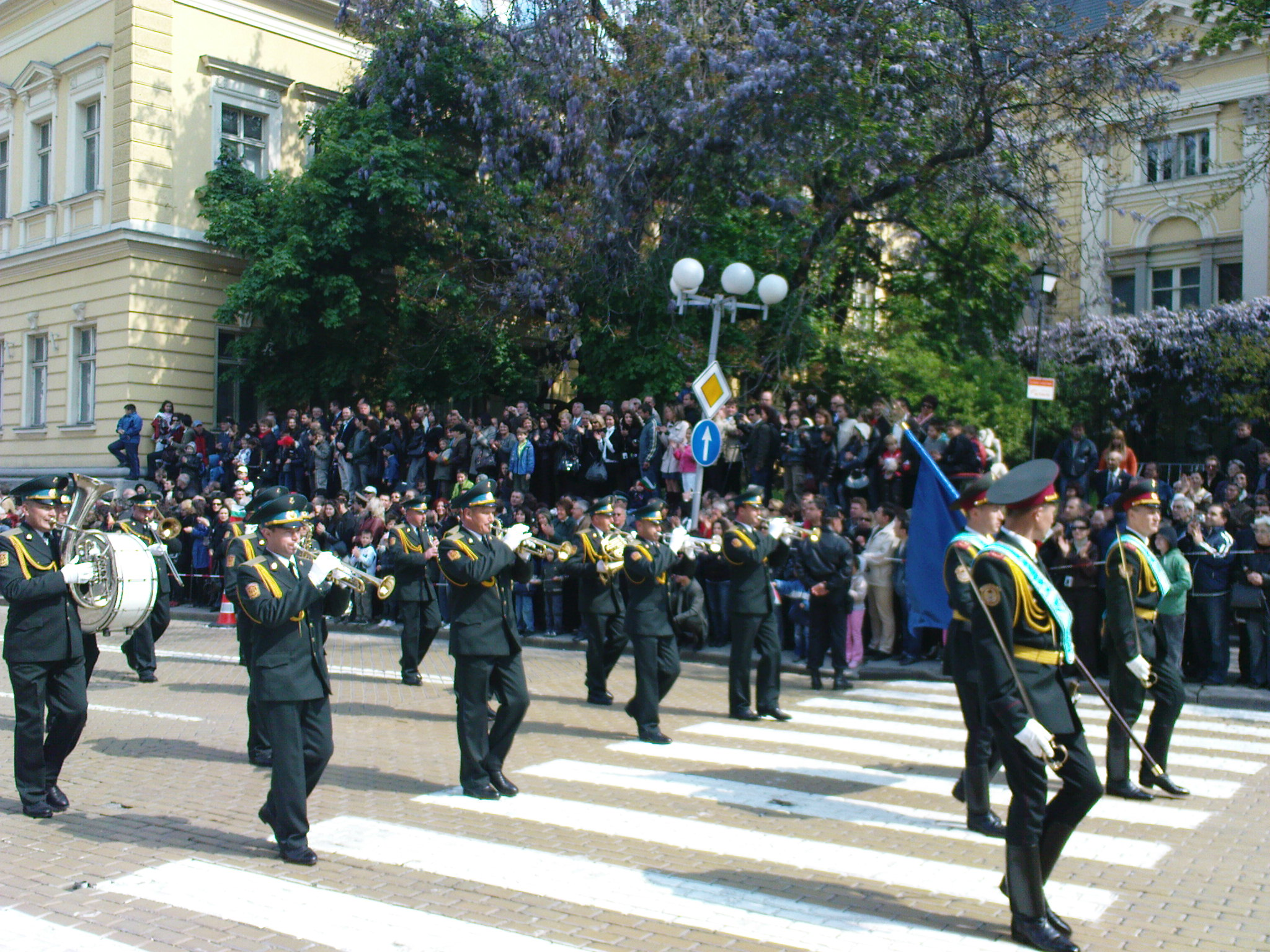
The National Exemplary Band in Sofia, Bulgaria, in 2009.

The National Exemplary Band of the Armed Forces of Ukraine performing the national anthem of Ukraine c. 2020.

It was founded in December 1945 on the basis of the Band of the Kiev Military District with Major Demyan Litnovsky acting as its first director. The band director is a senior musical leader in the Ukrainian military. The band currently gives performances for Ukrainian radio and television, documentaries and films, as well as for musical events. The band's activities have been repeatedly recognized by the military leadership. In December 1965, for the merits in the development of musical art in the Kiev Military District, the title of "Honored Orchestra of the Ukrainian SSR" ('Заслужений оркестр Української РСР') was conferred upon it.

The band repeatedly won prizes Soviet Army competitions including the Grand Prix at the International Festival of Brass Music in Yugoslavia and in October 1983, when the band was honored with the title of Friendship Festival winner in East Germany.

Notable members of the band have included Volodymyr Oerenko and Andrey Kondratyuk, both of whom are People's Artist of Ukraine.

== Music abilities ==
The repertoire of the band has promoted Ukrainian music, songs, marches, and classical works by Ukrainian and foreign composers. It includes variety of different ensembles, namely the brass band, the Dixieland band, and the folklore ensemble "Svyatovid". The band was the first performer of the Shche ne vmerla Ukrayina, the current national anthem of Ukraine.

== Lineage ==
Since its reestablishment in the Armed Forces of Ukraine in 1991, the band has been renamed several times:

- Separate Demonstration Band of the Ministry of Defense of Ukraine (1992–1995)
- Model Band of the Armed Forces of Ukraine (1995–2008)
- Honored Academic Band of Ukraine (2008)
- National Exemplary Band of the Armed Forces of Ukraine (since 2008)
