= Military Music Department of the General Staff of the Ukrainian Armed Forces =

Ceremonial music organization in the Ukrainian military

- (Ukrainian) Військово-музичне управління Збройних сил України
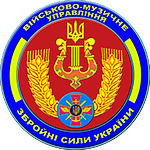
- Active: May 1992 - present
- Country: Ukraine
- Branch: Armed Forces of Ukraine
- Type: Military Band and Choir service
- Role: The organization of military bands and choirs in the Ukrainian Armed Forces
- Size: 1000+
- Headquarters: Kyiv
- Nickname: MMD-GSAFU

Commanders
- Senior Director of Music of the Armed Forces: Colonel Ihor Kishman

The Military Music Department of the General Staff of the Ukrainian Armed Forces serves as the official service of military bands and choirs in active service within the Armed Forces of Ukraine.

== List of Directors General – Senior Directors of Music of the Armed Forces ==
- Colonel Gennady Grigoriev (May 1992 – 1995)
- Major General Volodymyr Derkach (1995–2014)
- Colonel Viktor Pashchenko (2011—2014)
- Colonel Volodymyr Dashkovsky (2014–2023)
- Colonel Ihor Kishman (2023–present)

== History ==
In May 1992, in accordance with the proposal of the Chief of the General Staff, the Military Music Department of the General Staff was founded. It was formed in the basis of the Headquarters Military Band of the Kyiv Military District, which at that time was the top military band in the Ukrainian SSR, part of the larger massed bands of the Kyiv Garrison, and one of the best in the Soviet Union. The MMD was also raised on the basis of existing Soviet Armed Forces military bands within Ukrainian territory, such as the HQ Band of the Carpathian Military District. Since January 2015, a total of 41 bands are currently active within the MMD.

== Activities ==
The MMD-GSAFU accompanies activities carried out by the President of Ukraine, Minister of Defense of Ukraine, and the Chief of the General Staff. It is also responsible for the accompaniment of activities carried out by the regional garrisons of the Armed Forces of Ukraine. The military bands of the department are regular participants in the Kyiv Independence Day Parade, as well as participants in many military tattoo festivals and concerts in Ukraine and abroad. The military band department organizes the leadership of its bands, as well as oversees the training of musicians by the Military Music Centers of the different branches of the armed forces.

In 2016, 20 musicians from the Band of the 44th Artillery Brigade broke a record by performing the Shche ne vmerla Ukraina nearly 300 metres underground in a salt mine.

== Composition ==
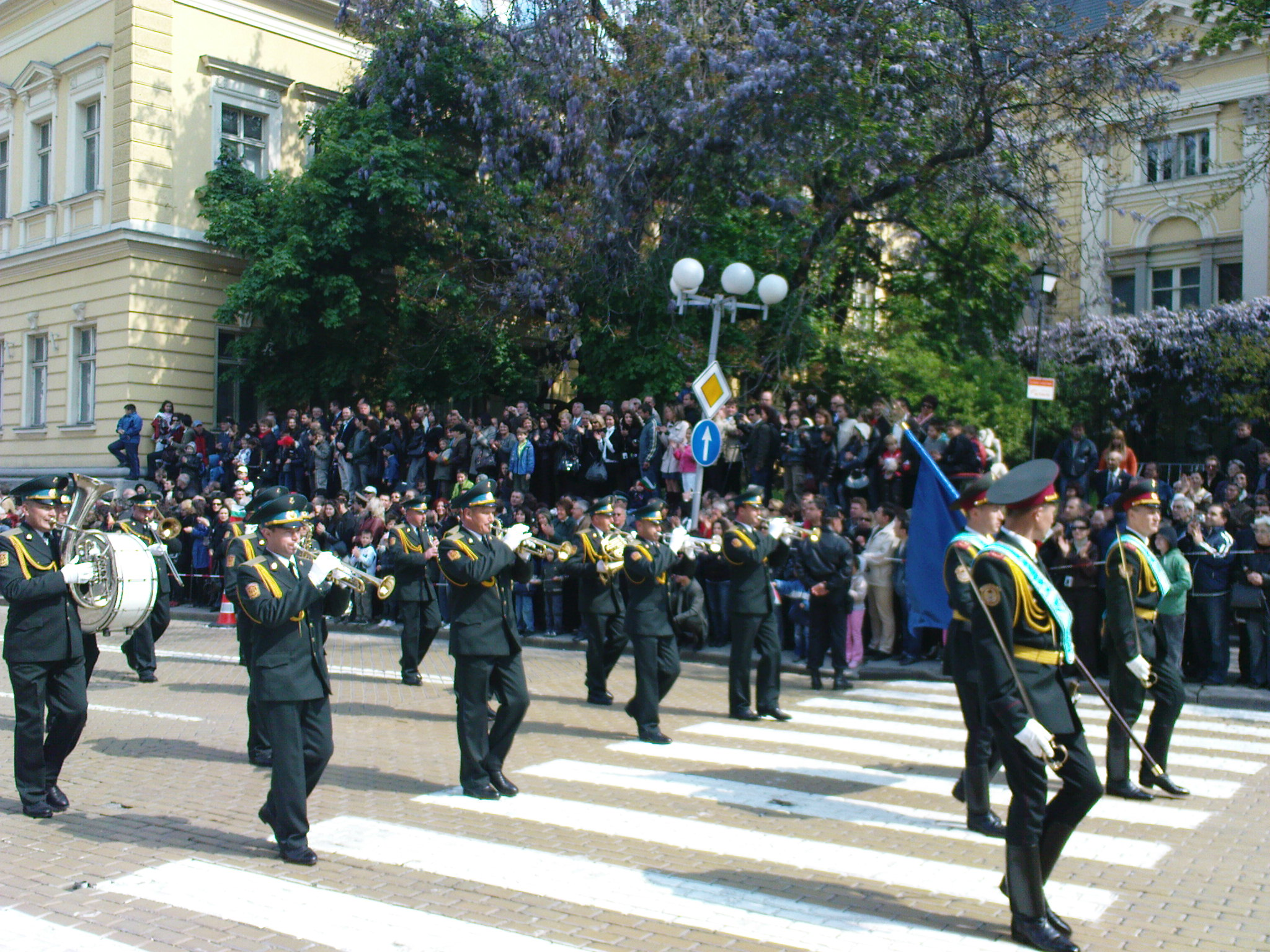
The National Exemplary Band in Sofia, Bulgaria in 2009.

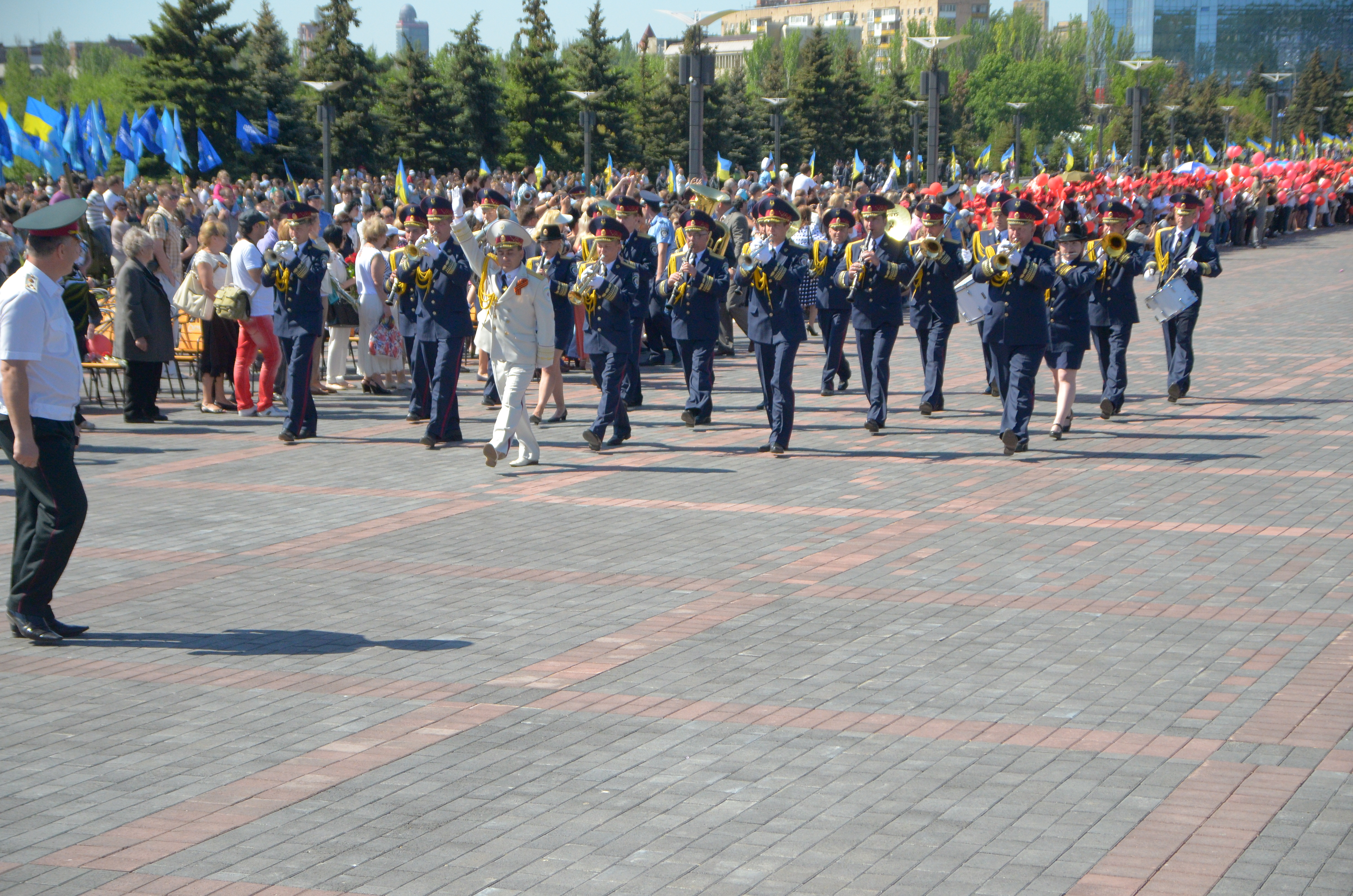
The Band of the Donetsk Garrison in 2013.

The band service is made up of the following bands:

- National Exemplary Band of the Armed Forces of Ukraine
- National Presidential Band of Ukraine
- Band of the Kyiv Presidential Honor Guard Battalion
- Military Music Center of the Ukrainian Ground Forces
  - HQ Band of the Military Music Center Ukrainian Ground Forces
  - Band of the Western Operational Command
  - Band of the Northern Operational Command
  - Band of the Southern Operational Command
  - Band of the Eastern Operational Command
  - Band of the 1st Tank Brigade
  - Band of the 44th Artillery Brigade
  - Band of the 30th Mechanized Brigade
  - Military Band of the 27th Artillery Regiment
- Military Music Center of the Ukrainian Air Force
  - Headquarters Band of the Military Music Center Ukrainian Air Force
  - Band of the Air Force Central Command
  - Band of the Air Force West Command
  - Band of the Air Force East Command
  - Band of the Air Force South Command
  - Band of the 38th Joint Basic Training Center
- Military Music Center of the Ukrainian Navy
  - Band of the Odesa National Maritime Academy - Ukrainian Naval College of Odesa
  - Mykolaiv Navy Band
- Military Music Center of the Ukrainian Marine Corps
  - Marine Corps Central Band
- Military Band of the National Defense University
- Military Band of the Hetman Petro Sahaidachnyi National Ground Forces Academy
- Military Band of the Ivan Kozhedub National Air Force University
- Military Band of the Military Institute of Telecommunications and Information Technologies
- Military Band of the Odesa Military Academy
- Military Band of the Ivan Bohun Military High School
- Military Band of the Yaroslav Mudryi National Law University
- Military Band Service of the National Guard of Ukraine
  - Band of the General Directorate of the National Guard of Ukraine
  - Band of the National Guard Military Academy of Ukraine
  - Band of the NGU National Honor Guard Battalion Kyiv
  - Band of the National Guard Training School
  - Band of the 25th Public Security Protection Brigade
  - Band of the 27th (Transport) Brigade
  - Band of the 50th National Guard Regiment, Ivano-Frankivsk
  - Band of the 21st Public Order Protection Brigade
  - Band of the Kharkiv National Academy of the National Guard
- Military Band of the 8th Special Purpose Regiment of the Special Operations Forces
- Military Band of the 8th Chernihiv Training Center
- Band of the State Special Transport Service of the Ministry of Infrastructure of Ukraine
- Band of the 95th Air Assault Brigade of the Ukrainian Air Assault Forces
- Band of the 194 Pontoon Bridge Brigade of the State Special Transport Service Samar

The National Exemplary Band, as the foremost military band, is the largest in the armed forces, employing over 100 musicians. There are some limits to the number of musicians in each band, with the music centers of each armed service branch employing 52 members, and academic bands employing 21 members.

== Current Formation of Massed Bands ==
Formation of massed military bands in Kyiv until 1998

- Timpani (optional)
- Chromatic Fanfare Trumpets, Field Drums (optional)
- 1st and 2nd Marching Percussion
  - Snare drums
  - Bass drums and Cymbals
  - Turkish crescents (optional)
  - Multiple tenor drums (optional)
  - Glockenspiels
- Trumpets, Cornets, Flugelhorns
- 1st Trombones
- 2nd Trombones
- Horns, Mellophones
- Clarinets, Oboes, Saxophones, Bassoons, Flutes and Piccolos
- Baritone horns, Alto and Tenor horns, Saxhorns, Euphoniums, Wagner Tubas, Tubas, Sousaphones

Formation of massed military bands in Kyiv from 2002 to 2003

- Front ensemble
  - Tubular bells
  - Orthodox bell set/s
  - Timpani (optional)
  - Concert bass drum/s
- Chromatic Fanfare Trumpets, Bugles, Field Drums (optional)
- 1st and 2nd Marching Percussion
  - Snare drums
  - Bass drums and Cymbals
  - Turkish crescents (optional)
  - Multiple tenor drums (optional)
  - Glockenspiels
- 1st Trombones
- 2nd Trombones
- French Horns, Mellophones
- Trumpets, Cornets, Flugelhorns
- Clarinets, Bass Clarinets, Oboes, English Horns, Bassons
- Saxophones
- Flutes and Piccolos
- Baritone horns, Alto and Tenor horns, Saxhorns
- Euphoniums, Wagner Tubas
- Tubas, Sousaphones, Contrabass Bugles, Helicons

== Gallery ==
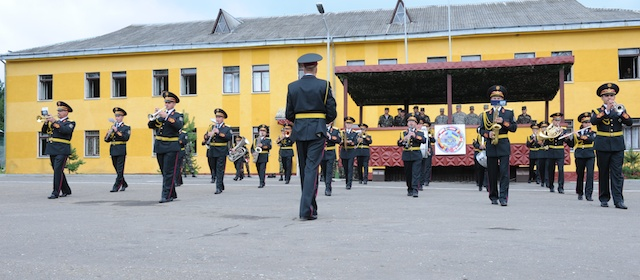
The Military Band of the Hetman Petro Sahaidachnyi National Ground Forces Academy

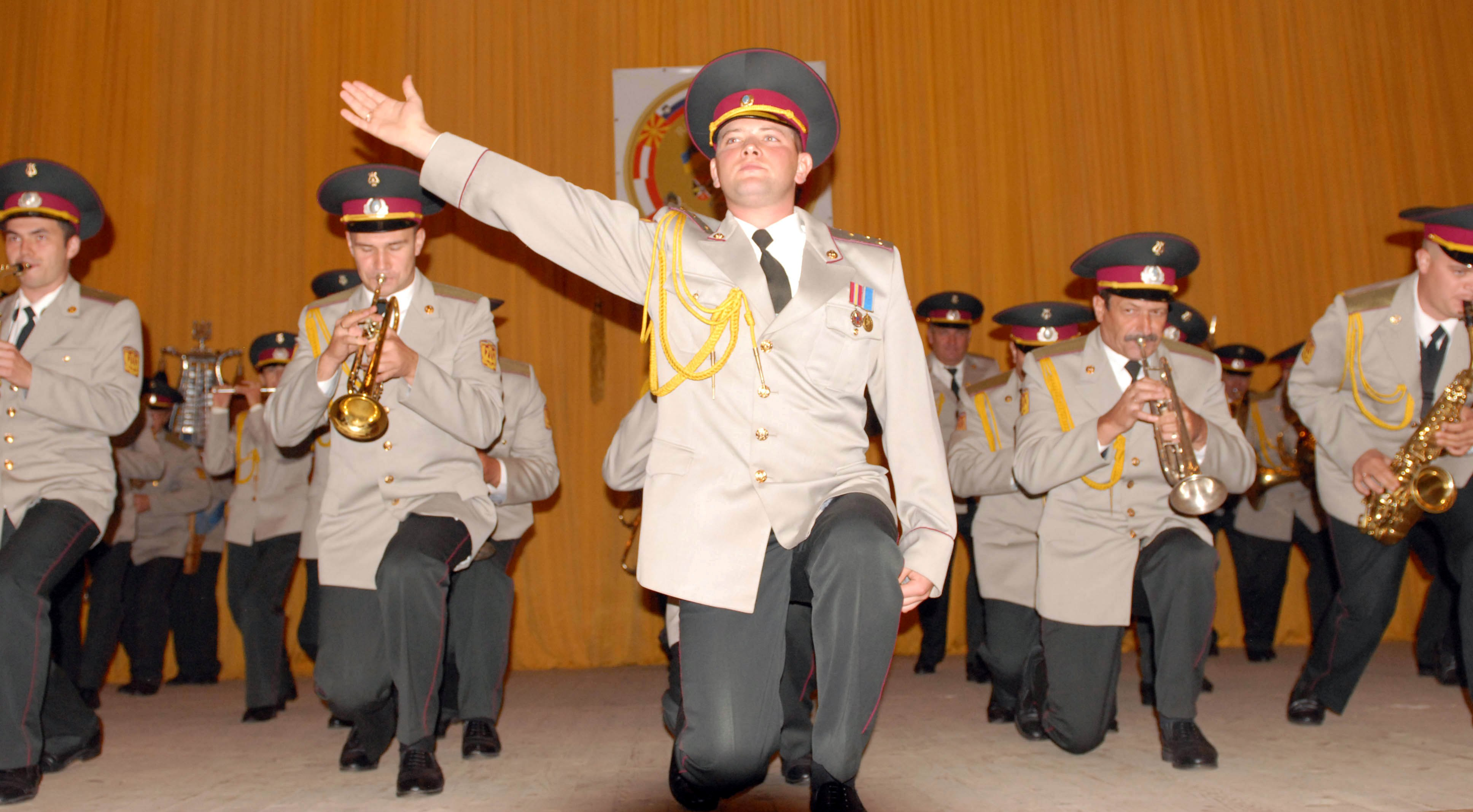
Musicians of the Military Music Center of the Ukrainian Ground Forces

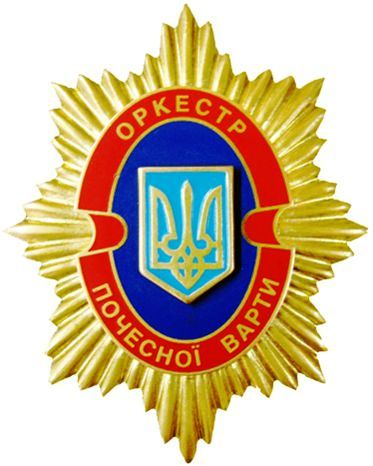
Emblem of the Band of the Kyiv Presidential Honor Guard Battalion

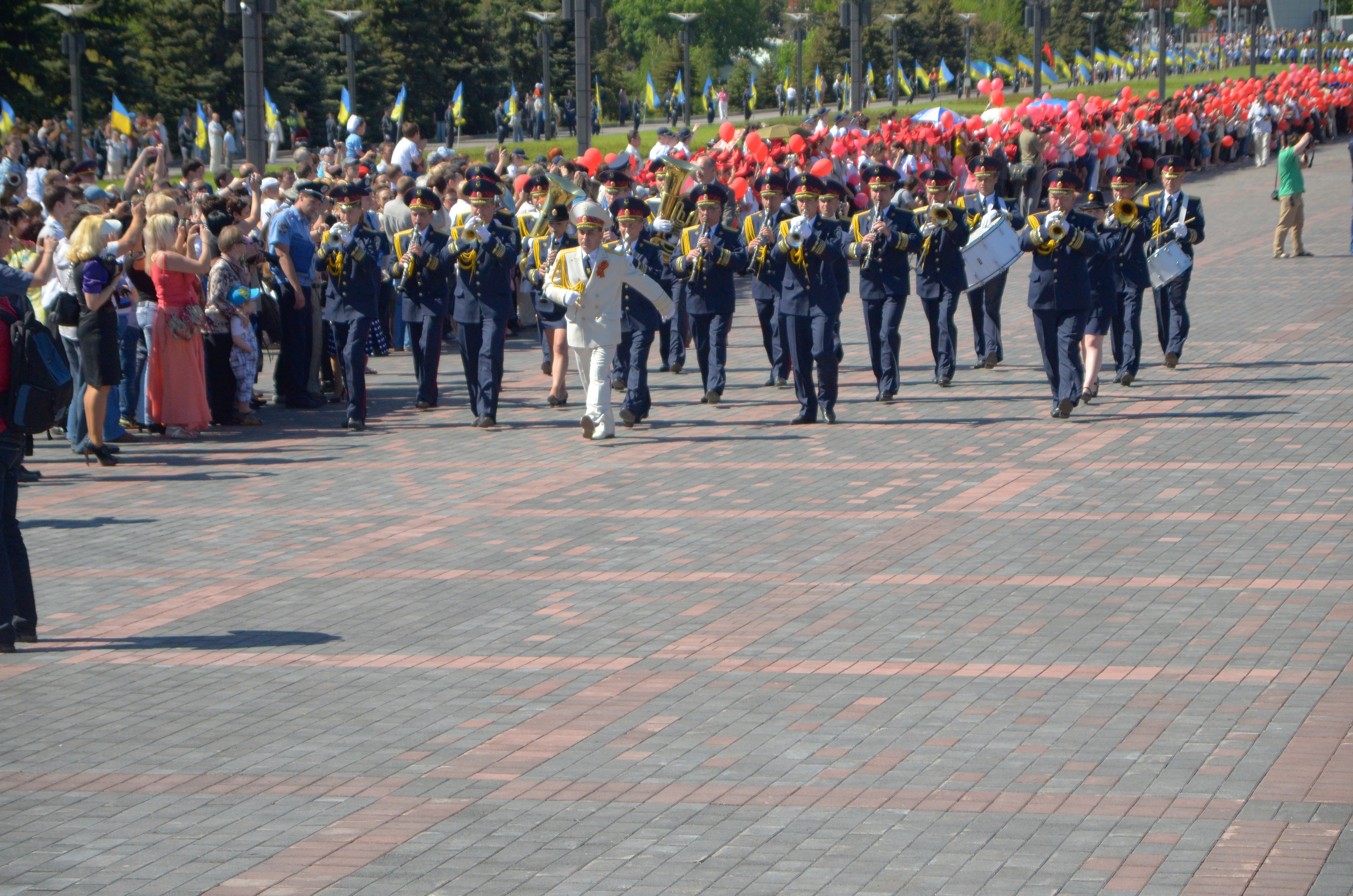
The Band of the Donetsk Garrison

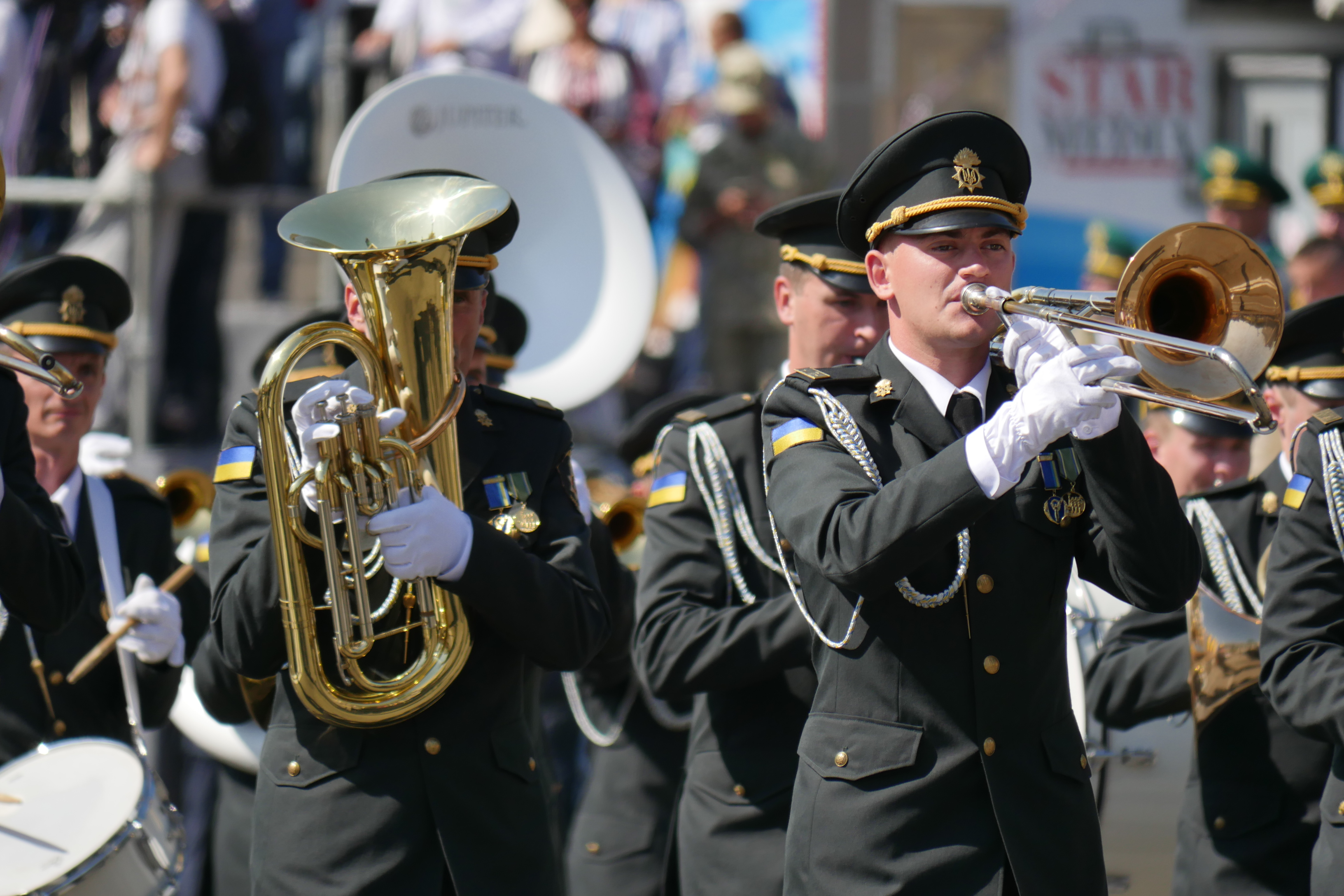
The Central Band of the National Guard of Ukraine

== See also ==
- Military bands of the Bundeswehr
- Russian military bands
- Representative Central Band of the Polish Armed Forces
- Representative Central Band of the Romanian Army
