= Kyiv Presidential Honor Guard Battalion =

Honor Guard Battalion
- Батальйон почесної варти
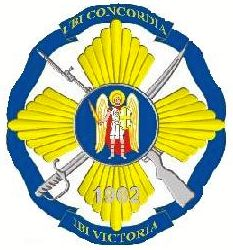
- Official Badge
- Active: 10 November 1962–present
- Country: USSR (1962–1991); CIS (1991–1992); Ukraine (1992–present)
- Branch: Soviet Army (1962–1993); Armed Forces of Ukraine (1992–Present)
- Type: Honor Guard
- Role: Memorial Affairs; Ceremonies and Special Events (one company)
- Part of: Independent Presidential Regiment
- Garrison/HQ: Kyiv (1962–1974, 1975–Present); Bila Tserkva (1974–1975)
- Mottos: Де згода, там перемога Latin: Ubi concordia ibi victoria
- Colors: Crimson
- March: Quick: March of the Presidential Regiment of Ukraine; Slow: Military March
- Anniversaries: November 10 (Day of the Honor Guard Company)

Commanders
- Current commander: Lieutenant Colonel Yevhen Solodayev

The Kyiv Presidential Honor Guard Battalion (Ukrainian: Почесна варта Окремого Київського полку Президента України, romanized: Pochesna varta Okremoho Kyivskoho polku Prezydenta Ukrainy) is a guard of honour unit of the Armed Forces of Ukraine. It is a part of the Hetman Bohdan Khmelnytsky Independent Presidential Guard Brigade.

== History ==
On November 10, 1962, the Honor Guard Company of the Kiev Military District was raised to provide public duty operations. In 1975, the company was moved to Kyiv after being stationed in Bila Tserkva for one year. It formed the 427th Regiment of the Soviet Union's Civil Defense. For 16 years it was the official honor guard of the Ukrainian SSR. On March 10, 1992, an honor guard company was introduced into the brigades of the General Staff of the Armed Forces of Ukraine. A year later, in 1993, the Guard of Honor of the Ministry of Defence of Ukraine was formed, and 3 years later, an additional training company was created. On February 15, 2001, it was integrated into the ranks of the Independent Presidential Regiment and was renamed the Kyiv Presidential Honor Guard Battalion.

== Structure ==
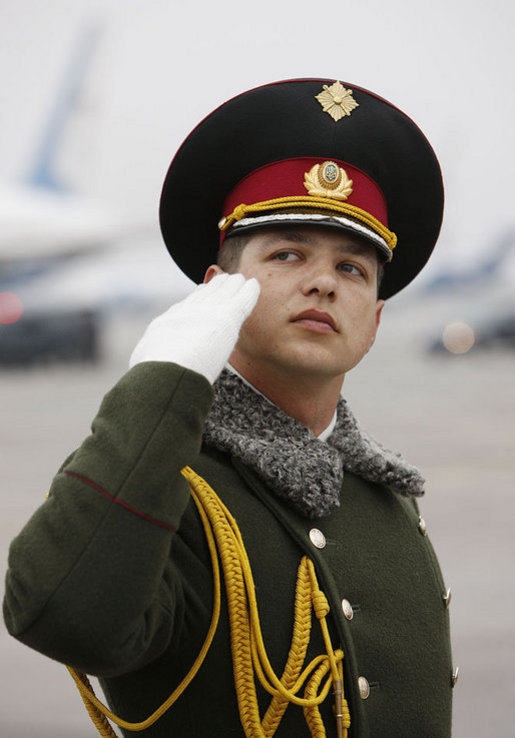
A soldier of the battalion at Boryspil International Airport in Kyiv.

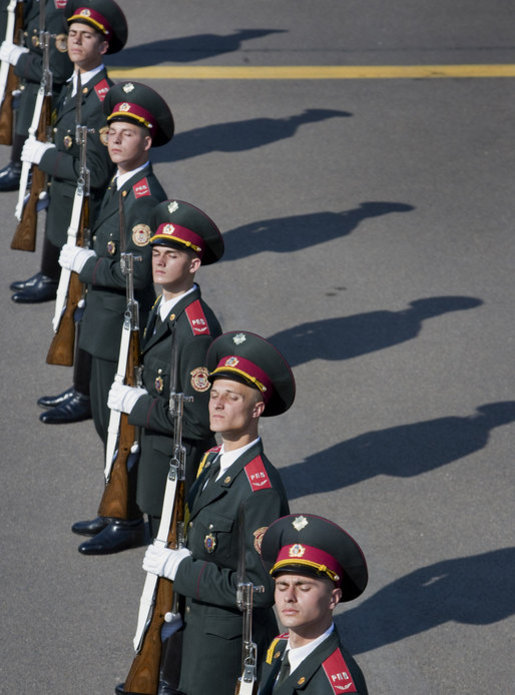
Armed honour guards from the battalion presenting arms upon Vice President Dick Cheney's departure from Kyiv in September 2008.

- Battalion HQ
- 1st Company
- 2nd Company
- 3rd Company (subordinated to the Ministry of Defense)
- Military Band
- Symbols Protection Company
- Training Company

All eligible candidates to join the battalion have to meet certain requirements such as fluency in the Ukrainian language, having a height of at least 180 cm, full secondary education and no physical and/or mental problems.

== Traditions ==
=== Activities ===
The battalion takes part in events coinciding with the following Public holidays in Ukraine:

- Independence Day of Ukraine
- Victory Day over Nazism in World War II
- State Flag Day
- Constitution Day
- Defender of Ukraine Day
- Navy Day
- Armed Forces Day

Generally, the battalion also takes part in the following different events, whether it be annual or semi-annual:

- Foreign and domestic military tattoos
- State visits
- Award ceremonies
- Ukrainian presidential inauguration
- Wreath laying ceremonies at the Tomb of the Unknown Soldier in the Park of Eternal Glory
- State funerals

=== Marching style ===
The battalion utilizes the native German goosestep (first introduced by King Frederick the Great) with the speed of the step being 75 steps per minute and elements of the marching pace of the Sich Riflemen Halych-Bukovyna Kurin.

=== Heraldry ===
There are many commemorative and high-ranking badges specific to the honour guard that soldiers of the battalion earn throughout their careers. One of them, called "Concordia" was developed in 2007 in honor of the 45th anniversary of the creation of the honor guard in 1962. Another badge features Michael, a figure of the coat of arms of the city of Kyiv, indicates the place of deployment of the battalion into the city, and represents the unit's status as a representative unit. The Latin language inscription on the badge: "Ubi concordia ibi victoria" (meaning "Where there is unity, there is victory" when translated) is the heraldic motto of this battalion.

== Uniform ==
The general uniform of the battalion was unveiled on 24 August 2016 based on British and Polish military styles such as a variant of the Polish Rogatywka (the previous one was a peaked cap). The actual uniform jacket was changed from black to brown. It also incorporates details from the uniforms worn by the Ukrainian People's Army, including a cap which features an insignia of a Ukrainian Cossack grasping a cross. Although mainly designed for the Ukrainian Army, the other services represented in the based their new uniforms off of the army's update. All of this was partly done in response to the ongoing Russian military intervention and later invasion of Ukraine as well as decommunization and derussification in Ukraine to distance the battalion from its ceremonial counterparts in the Soviet Army/Russian Army.

Members of the battalion are equipped with a standard SKS rifle, which is used commonly by post-Soviet honour guards.

=== Sabre ===
In 2018, the battalion replaced the standard Soviet officer cavalry sabre (Шабля) from the 1940s with a newer model based on the "Cossack Sword" and designed by the Main Directorate of Development and Material Support. It was first unveiled at the Kyiv Independence Day Parade celebrating Independence Day and the 100th anniversary of the revival of Ukrainian statehood in August of that year. It combines historically Ukrainian designs from swords of the Cossack times with the modern military elements of the Ukrainian Armed Forces. It is in fact based on 16th century weapons used by the Ukrainian Cossacks of Zaporizhia in Eastern Europe.

=== Shoulder patches and rank insignia ===
The battalion uses the following three different patches for the three different platoons in each company who are from all three service branches. Every patch has the Ukrainian language term for guard of honour at the top and the Ministry of Defence's name at the bottom. They are identified by the following colors:

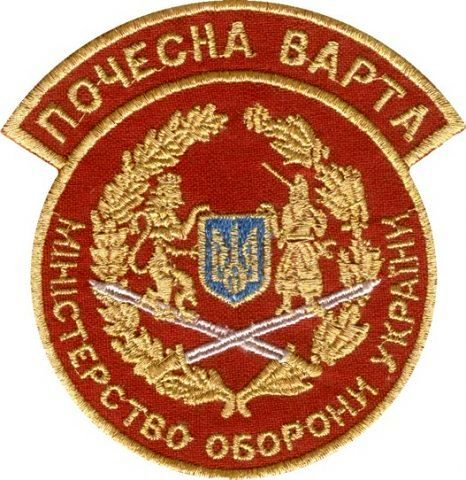
Red (Ukrainian Ground Forces)

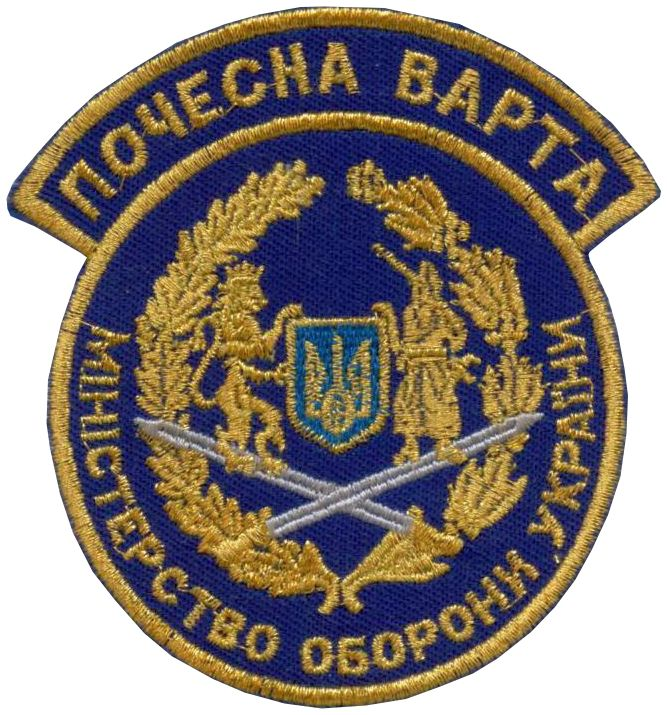
Blue (Ukrainian Air Force)

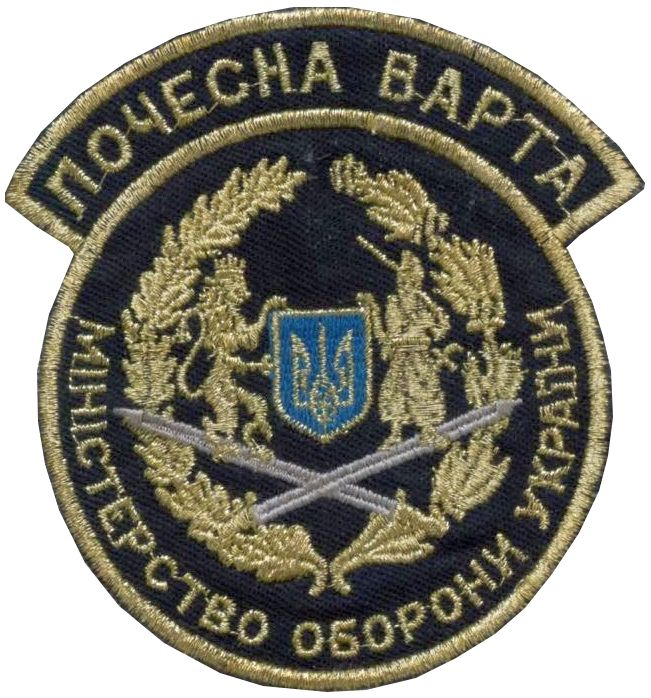
Black (Ukrainian Navy)

Since 1993, the same design has been used on the battalion shoulder board:

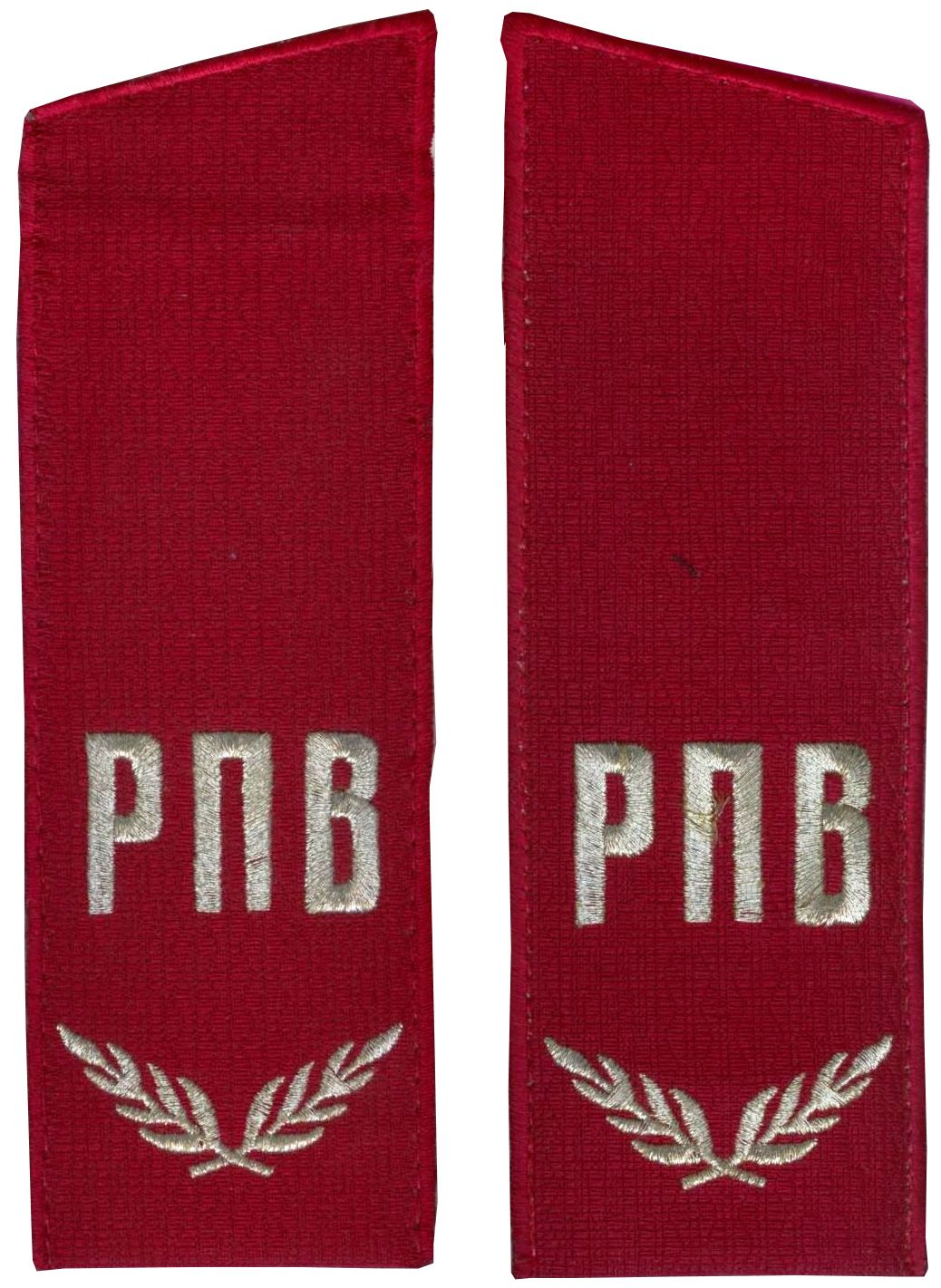

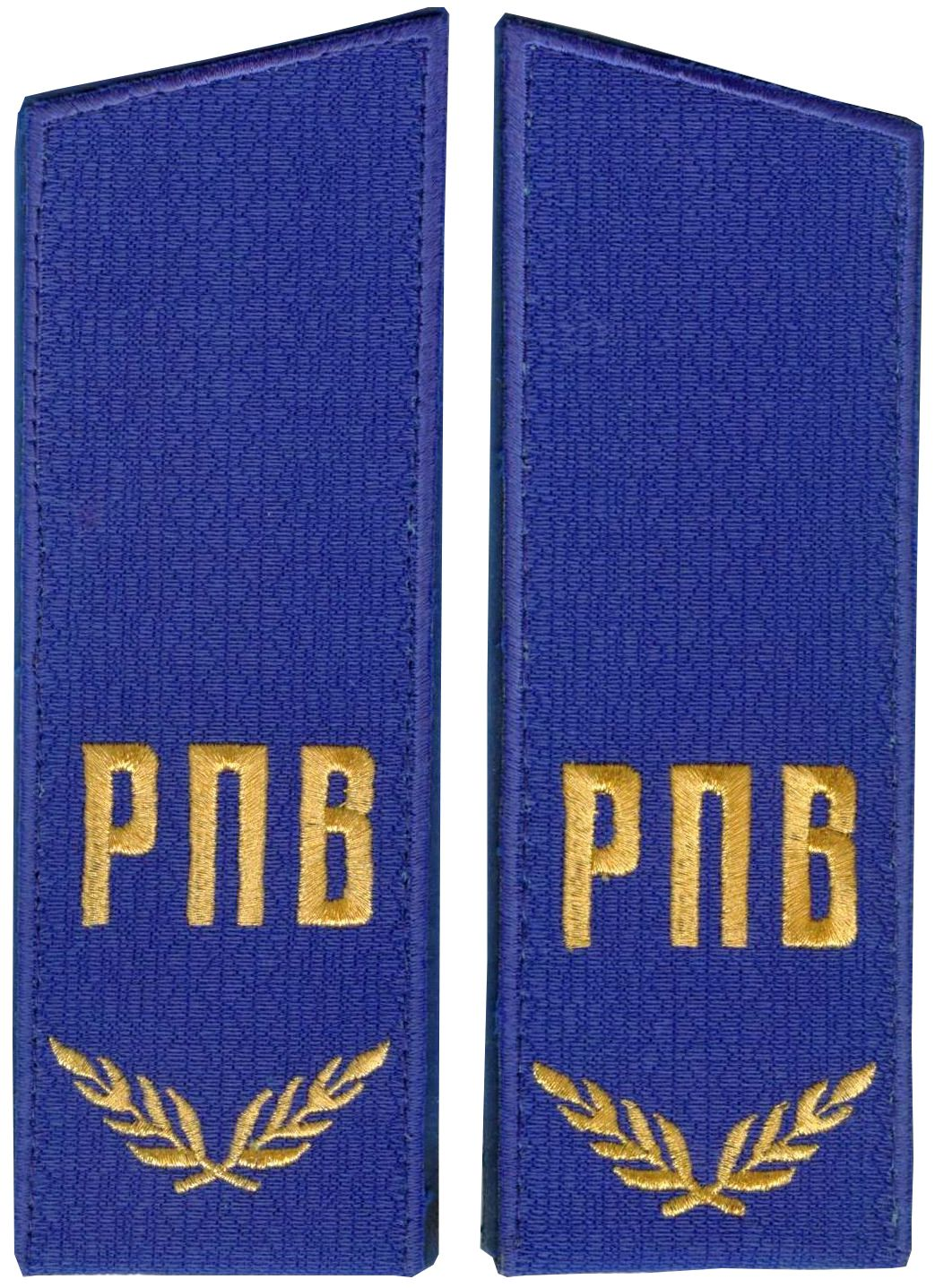

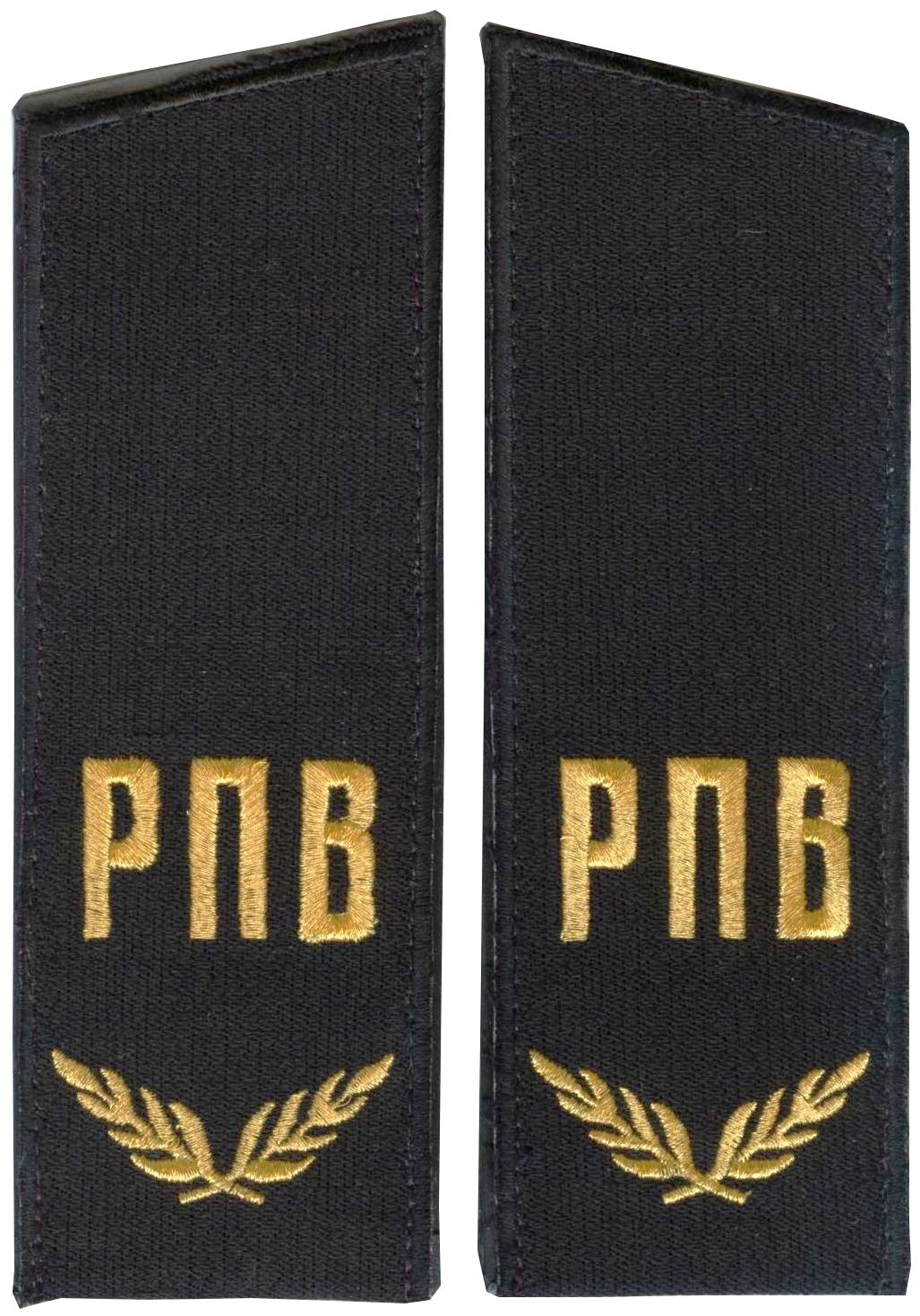

== List of commanders ==
- Captain I. Bondarenko (March 1993 – September 1996)
- Major I. Kozyrkov (September 1996 – July 2001)
- Major V. Plakhtiy (July 2001 – October 2004)
- Major V. Skoryk (October 2004 – November 2005)
- Major S. Klyavlin (November 2005 – June 2011)
- Lieutenant Colonel E. Golovanchuk (June 2011 – 2013)
- Major Oleksiy Pochtar (2013–2018)
- Major Yevhen Solodayev (2018–Present)

== Gallery ==
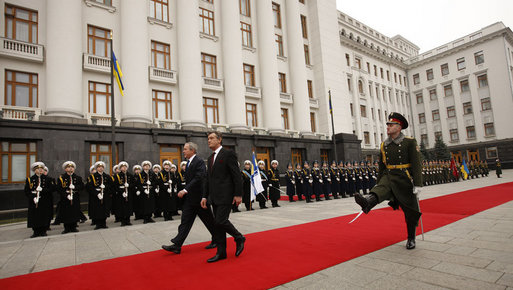
President George W. Bush inspecting the guard at the Presidential Administration of Ukraine.

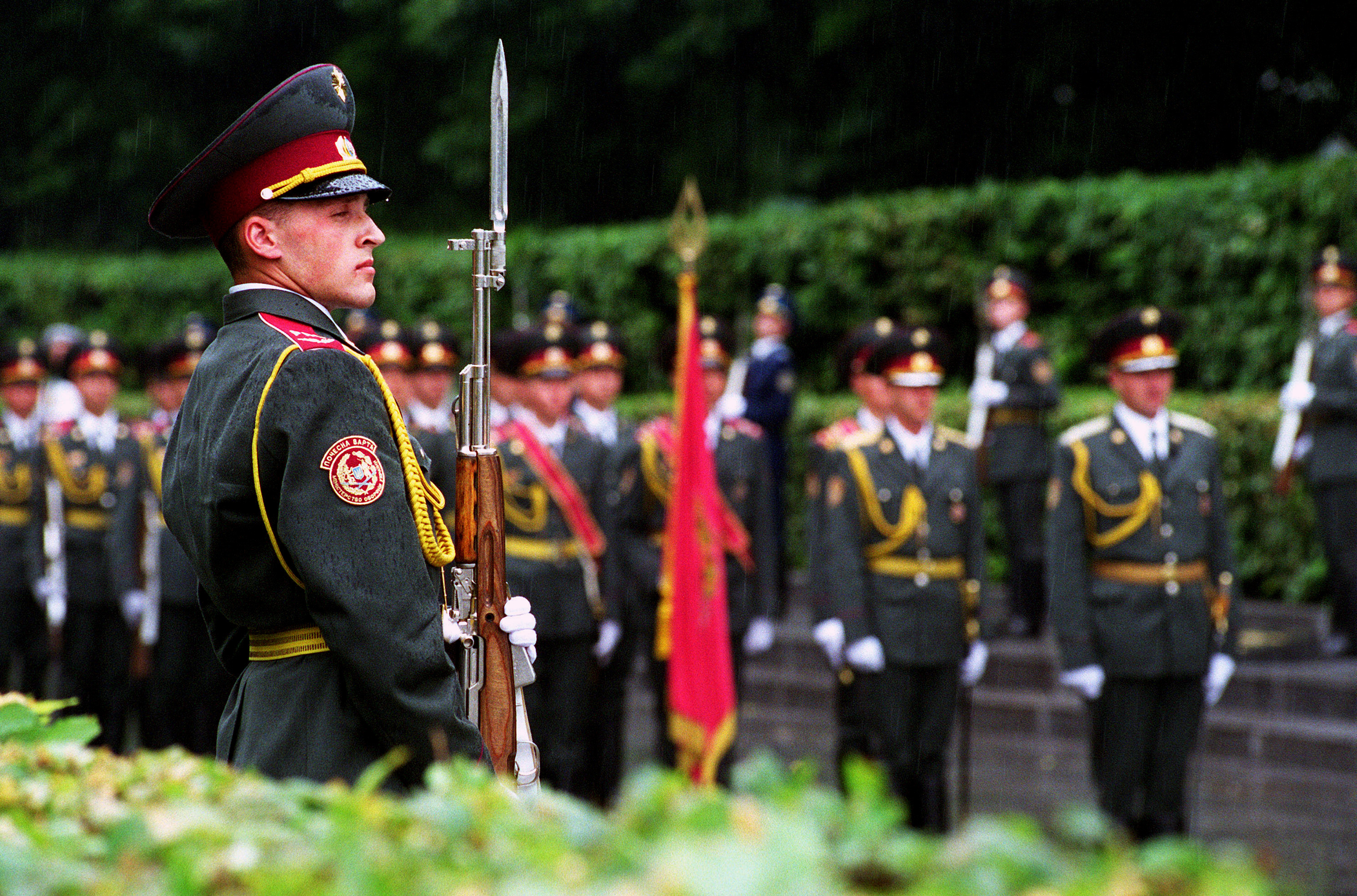
A soldier of the honor guard at the Tomb of the Unknown Soldier.

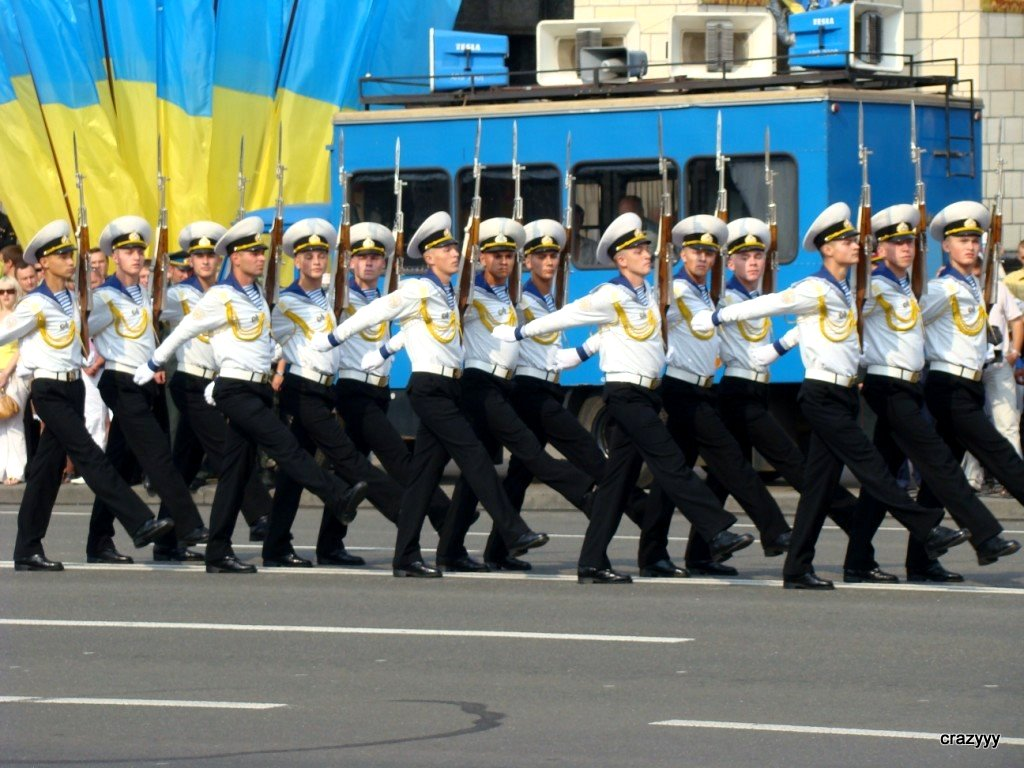
Members of the representative Navy platoon on Maidan Nezalezhnosti during the Kyiv Independence Day Parade.

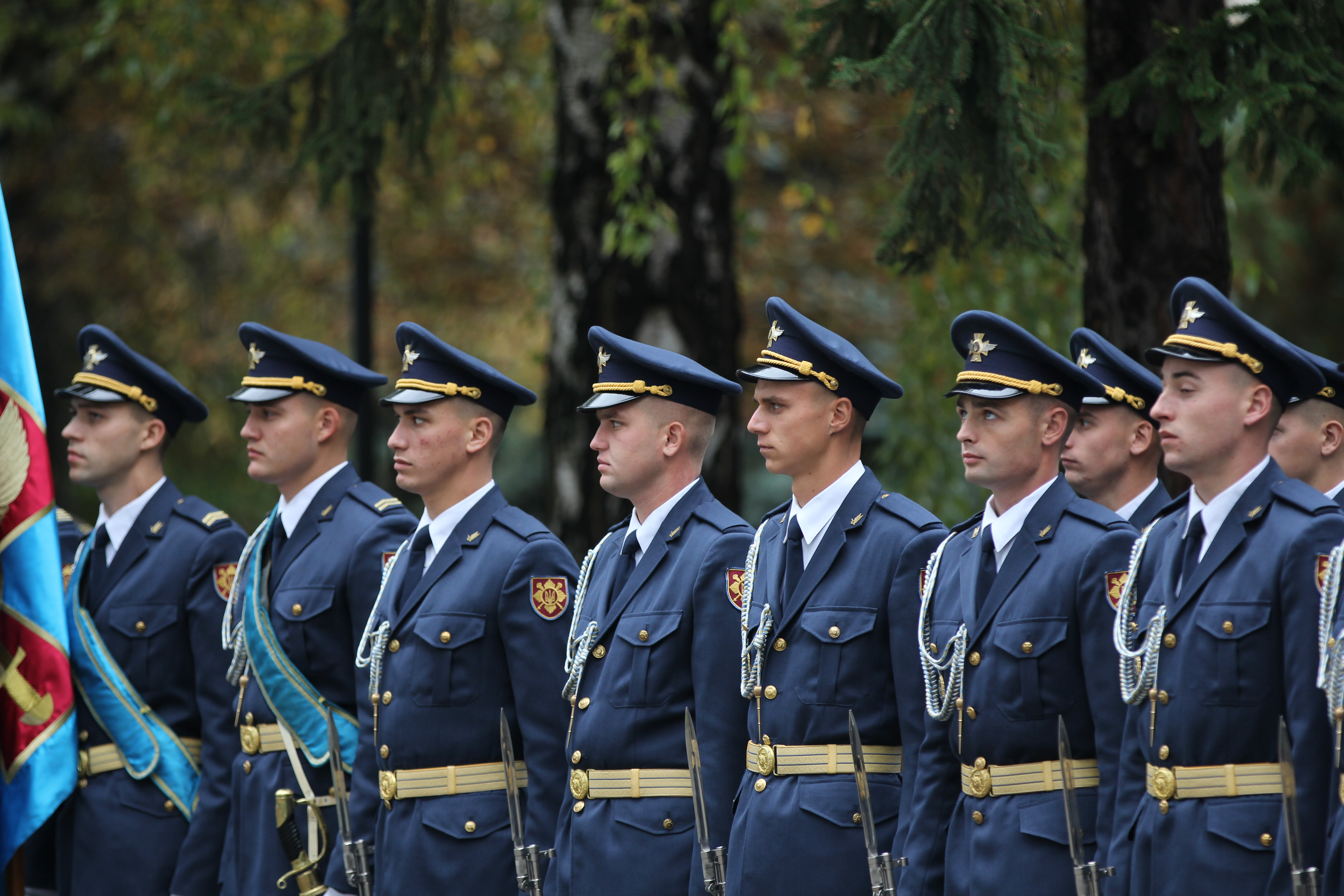
Members of the representative Air Force platoon.

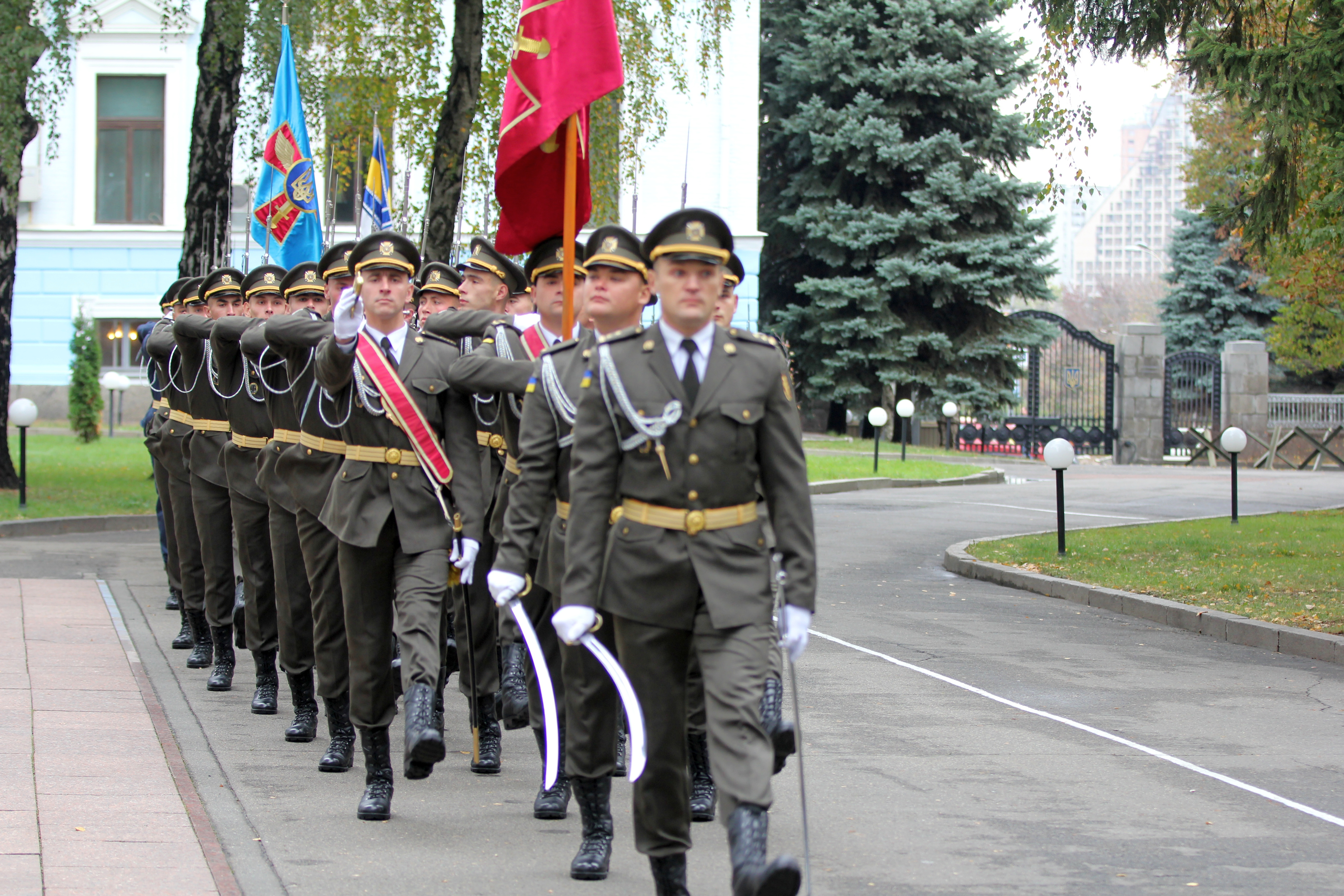
The unit conducting a military parade at the Ministry of Defence.

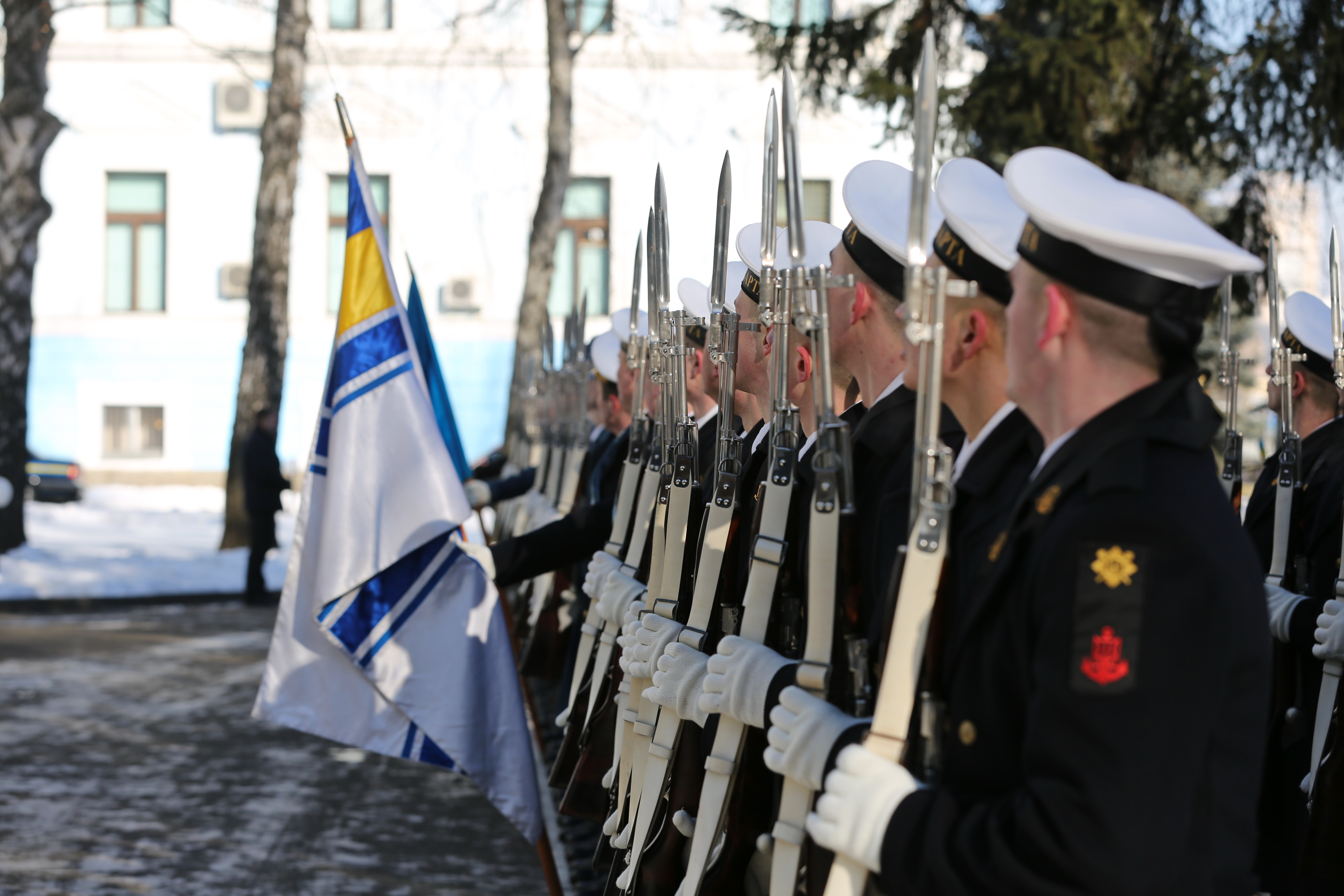
Members of the battalion rendering honors for a visiting military leader.

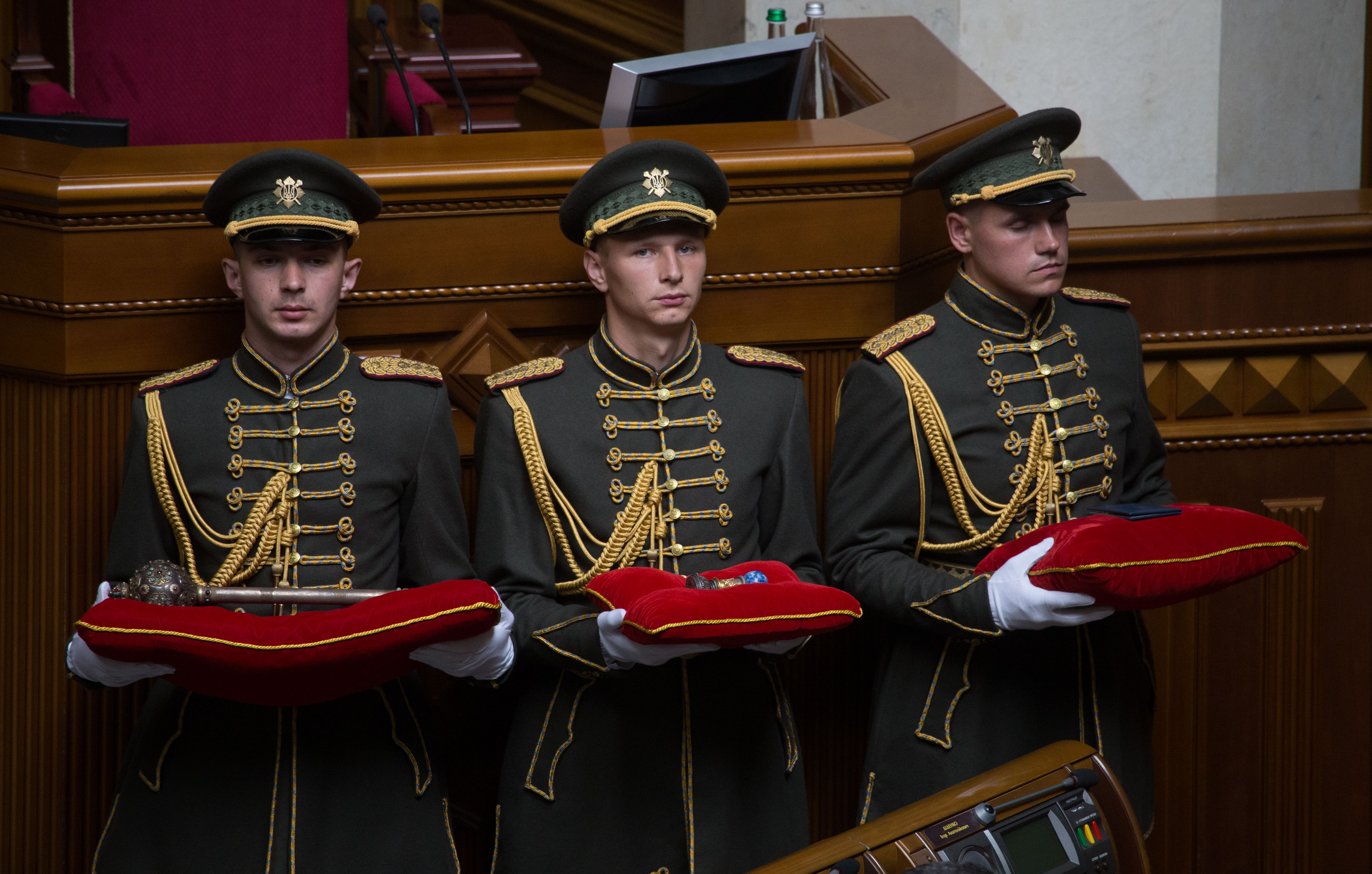
Members of the battalion during the inauguration of Volodymyr Zelenskyy.

== See also ==
- Guard of honour
- Independent Presidential Regiment (Ukraine)
- Special Honor Guard Battalion of the National Guard of Ukraine
- Kremlin Regiment
- Honor Guard of the Armed Forces of Belarus
