= House of Military Officers =

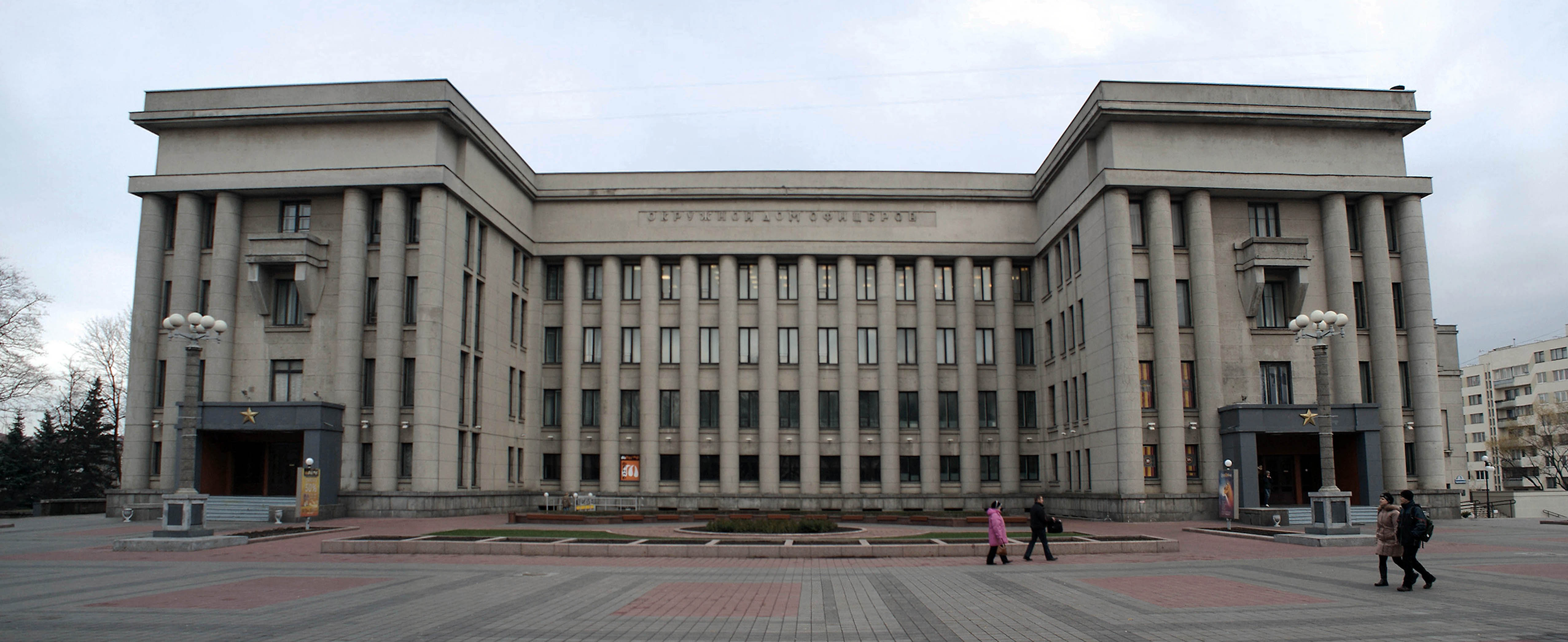
The Minsk House of Officers.

A House of Officers (Russian: Дом офицеров), sometimes officially referred to as the Central House of Officers or Officer Houses, is a military and cultural institution originating in the Soviet Army and present today in the Russian Armed Forces and the militaries of many Post-Soviet states. Being the Russian/Soviet equivalent to military officers' clubs in the United States, it effectively serves as cultural center serving to represent the military and to improve civil–military relations. It can be an independent formation in the national defence ministry or a public entity like a club-houses. In the early days of the Soviet Union the institution was called the House of the Red Army. The head of the building is a senior officer, usually with the rank of a Major or above.

The following are types of Officer Houses:

- District House of Officers
- Group House of Officers
- Garrison House of Officers
- Fleet House of Officers

Events in the building include cultural activities in order to meet the spiritual needs, educate, enlighten, and organize cultural activities for military personnel and civilian personnel of the Armed Forces and their families.

== Purposes ==
In Russia the activities of the House of Officers, aimed at the creation, preservation, dissemination and development of cultural values in various forms and types, is a cultural activity and has its own tasks:

- Historical and cultural military education by means of presenting art, music and spirituality
- Promoting the forms and methods of cultural and leisure work to the formation of military and civilian personnel in the Armed Forces for moral, psychological and military professional readiness to successfully accomplish the tasks of military service and fulfill the requirements of military discipline
- Familiarizing family members of servicemen with national values and military values
- Organizing cultural leisure of military personnel in the interests of maintaining their spiritual, emotional, moral and psychological state at the proper level.

Similar tasks are present in the Officers Houses of the armed forces of post-Soviet republics. In the Soviet era, party conferences were held for members of the Communist Party of the Soviet Union.

== Location and structure ==
As is tradition, an Officers House is located on one of the central streets of the garrison. The architecture of the building generally resembles a Palace of Culture or even a Cinema. Civilians, especially in remote garrisons, were usually the wives of officers or warrant officers serving in the garrison as well as civil service staff. The building has usually consists of the following rooms: a wardrobe, a lobby, a concert hall, a library, and a cafe, as well as a Russian Orthodox Church chapel and a mini-gallery of historical pictures. Choreographic and vocal ensembles, brass bands, and theatre troupes are commonplace at the house. Pop artists are commonly invited to perform at these places. Houses of Officers were located in all internal and external garrisons of the Soviet Armed Forces, including at Soviet bases in East Germany, Poland, Czechoslovakia, and Mongolia.

== List of officer houses in Russia ==
- Central House of Officers of the Russian Army – the main cultural institution of the Armed Forces of Russia, located in Moscow.
- Central Officers' Club of the Aerospace Forces
- House of Officers of the Western Military District
- House of Officers of the Southern Military District
- House of Officers of the Central Military District
- House of Officers of the Eastern Military District
- House of Officers of the Northern Fleet
- House of Officers of the Black Sea Fleet
- House of Officers of the Pacific Fleet
- House of Officers of the Caspian Flotilla
- House of Officers of the Kola Flotilla
- House of officers of the Samara Garrison
- House of officers of the Chita Garrison
- House of officers of the Ufa Garrison
- House of officers of the Novosibirsk Garrison
- House of officers of the Ussurisk Garrison

== Examples of notable officer houses ==
A number of buildings in which houses of officers were located are known precisely by such names, despite the fact that their use at the present time may be different.

- Central House of Officers (Minsk)
- House of Officers (Almaty)
- Kazakh Museum of Folk Musical Instruments (known as the House of Officers until 1980)
- Presidential Palace, Vilnius (known as the House of Officers until 1997)
- Central House of Officers of the Armed Forces of Ukraine
- House of Officers (Ashgabat)
- House of Officers (Dushanbe)
- Central House of Officers named after Hazi Aslanov (Baku)
- Artsakh Defence Army House of Officers (Stepanakert)
- Army Museum of Moldova (located in the building of the former House of Officers)
- Central Army House of the General Staff of the Armed Forces of the Kyrgyzstan
- Club of the Warsaw Garrison Command
- Central Military Club (Sofia)

== See also ==
- Gentry assembly
- Gentlemen's club
- Kaunas Garrison Officers' Club Building

=== Other Soviet entertainment complexes ===
- Palace of Culture
- Palace of Sports
- People's House, previous term that existed in the Russian Empire
- Pioneers Palace (House of Young Pioneers)
