= Kazakh Museum of Folk Musical Instruments =

Museum in Almaty, Kazakhstan

Coordinates: 43°15′34″N 76°57′25″E

The Ykhlas Museum of Folk Musical Instruments
- Yqylas atyndağy halyq muzykalyq aspaptar muzeyı
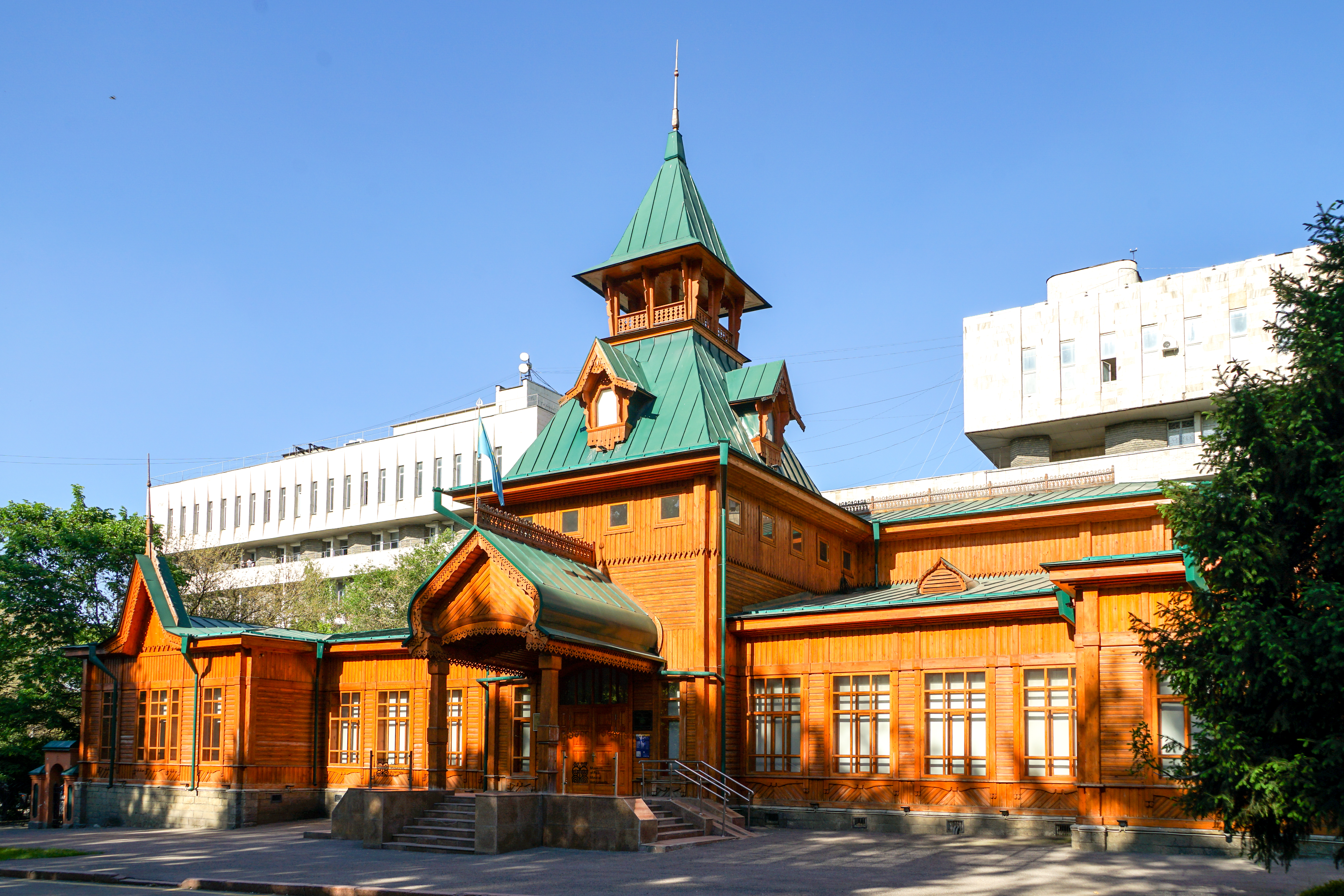
- Interactive map of the The Ykhlas Museum of Folk Musical Instruments area
- Former names: House of Officers; (Before 1980)

General information
- Location: Almaty, Kazakhstan
- Completed: 1908
- Opened: 1980 as a museum

Website
- https://almatymuseum.kz/yhlas-en/

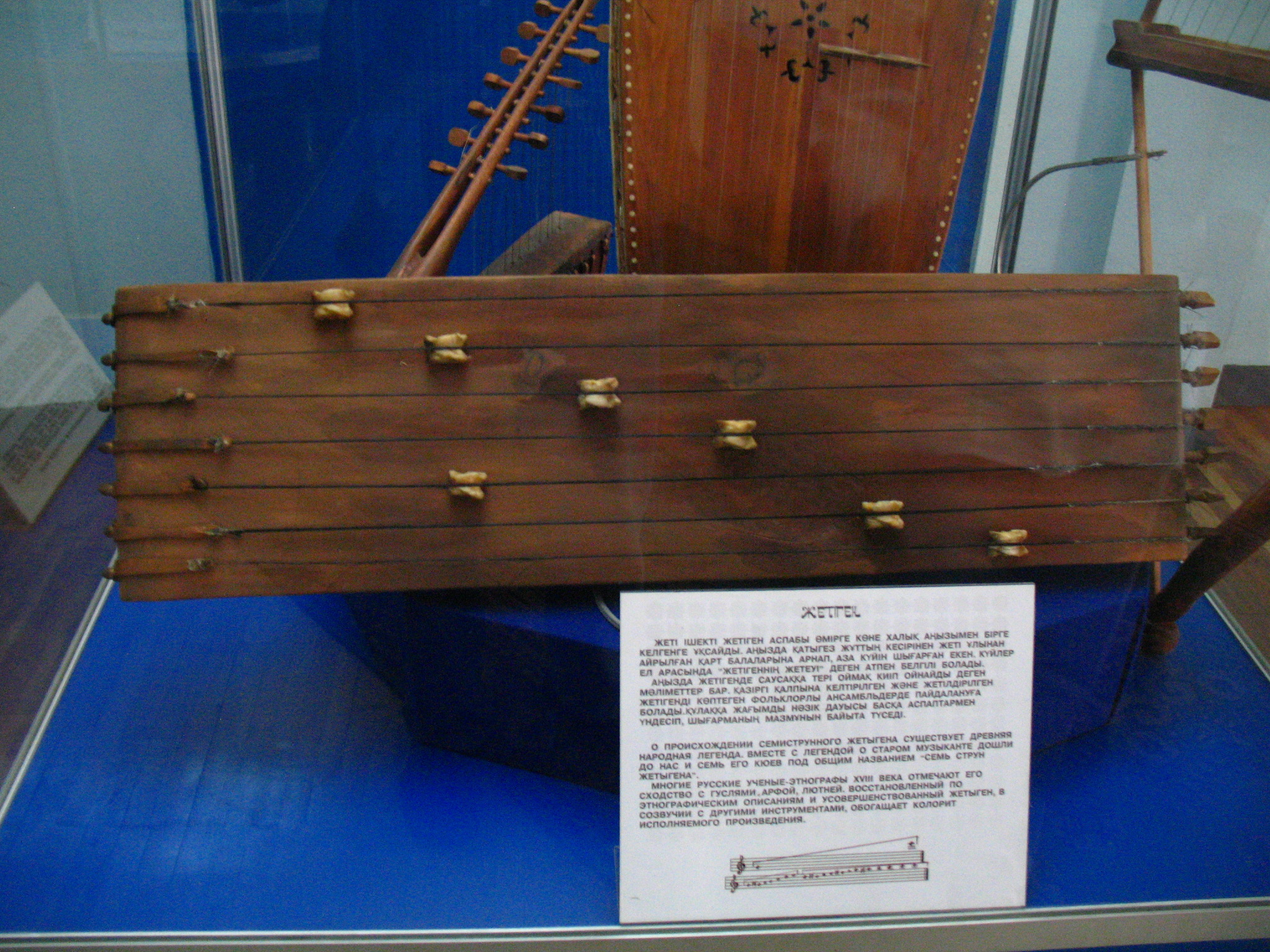
A jetigen harp on display at the museum.

The Ykhlas Museum of Folk Musical Instruments (Kazakh: Ықылас атындағы халық музыкалық аспаптар музейі, Yqylas atyndağy halyq muzykalyq aspaptar muzeyı, [ɯqɯˈlɑs ɑtɯndɑˈɣɯ xɑlˈɯq muzɨˈkalɯq ɑspɑpˈtɑr muˈzʲɛjə]) is a musical instrument museum located in Almaty, Kazakhstan.

Located in Panfilov Park, the wooden building was erected in 1908, simultaneously with Ascension Cathedral. During the period, the military leadership of the Turkestan governor-generalship once met here for ceremonies and state receptions.

== History ==
The cathedral was built in the style of Old Russian architecture, designed by the famous architect A.P. Zenkov. The museum is one of the few that has survived since the times of Verny city.

After the establishment of the Soviet Union, the building was used as the House of Officers until 1980, when it was transformed into the musical instruments museum.

The museum was named after Great Kazakh musician of 19-20th centuries Ykylas, who promoted the purity of folk culture and preservation of various national instruments.

== Architecture ==
The wooden building, rectangular in plan and covered with boards, is a tower. The windows are tall, rectangular, three-winged, abundantly carved platbands; the facades are decorated with applied wooden carving. Space-planning solution is triaxial, which is singled out on the main facade of the mosque by risalits. The central risalit is accented by two-tiered hipped roof, with ornately decorated carved platbands of dormer windows. The upper tier is through, with a four-slope roof supported by carved pillars. The side risalits have a single-pitch metal roof. The main entrance is accentuated by a keel-shaped high porch leaning on carved pillars. Small square windows are used in the upper tier of the tower volume. The attic windows are keeled.

During the 1979 reconstruction, Kazakh national patterns were added to the wooden carvings: "agash" - tree of life, "shynzhara" - running waves, "uzilmes" - curly stem, "otkizbe" - horn-like curl.

== Museum exposition ==
The museum exhibits musical instruments of outstanding performers of the past singers-improvisers and composers Abai Qunanbaiuly, Birzhan, Qurmangazy Sagyrbaiuly, Makhambet Otemisuly, Shashu-bay, Dina Nurpeisova, Kazangap, Nartay, Kenen, Seitek, Muryn-zhyrau, Kyzyl-zhyrau, Zhambyl Zhabayuly, Boltyrik-zhyrau, A. Zhubanov, A. Kashaubaev, A. Khasenov, D. Myktybaev and many others.

The museum of musical instruments consists of several halls:

- Sources of folk music - history of musical instruments of Turkic peoples;
- Hall of wind and percussion instruments - tells about such instruments as dauylpa, dudyga, shyn, asatayak, dabyl, kos dunkildek and shyndauyl;
- The Hall of Masters - the winning instruments of the first Republican Instrument-Making Contest "Aniz dombyra";
- Kobyz Hall;
- The hall of Turkic peoples' musical instruments - 27 musical instruments of 14 Turkic-speaking countries;
- The Hall of Musical Instruments of the World Peoples - 81 musical instruments from 27 countries of the world.

== Modern condition ==
Today, there are more than 1,000 items of instruments in the museum's collection, which are divided into 60 types of Kazakh national musical instruments. The collection also includes instruments, which were owned by famous singers-improvisers and composers. The most ancient exhibits date back to the 17th century.

From the outside, the building is made of wood and resembles the traditional Russian building. Inside, the decoration corresponds to classic Kazakh national patterns. In front of the building stands a sculpture of the narkobyz, a Kazakh bow instrument.

== Monument status ==
The April 4, 1979 decision of the executive committee of the Almaty City Council of People's Deputies building "House of Officers" (at that time) has acquired the status of a monument of history and culture, and was placed under the protection of the state.

On January 26, 1982, the building (at that time, the Republican Puppet Theater) was included in the list of historical and cultural monuments of national significance of the Kazakh SSR.

On November 25, 1993, it became part of the Almaty State Historical-Architectural and Memorial Reserve. New construction is prohibited on the territory of the reserve. Reconstruction of objects is possible only with the permission of the Ministry of Culture and Sports of Kazakhstan.

On September 27, 2006, the mayor of the city, Imangali Tasmagambetov, issued a decree, which proposed to the Government of Kazakhstan to exclude the museum building (Proletarskaya street, 24) from the State List of Historical and Cultural Monuments of Almaty, as a monument of local importance. This resolution was rejected, since the building had been a monument of historical and cultural significance of national importance since 1982.

== Administration ==
Before the collapse of the USSR, the museum was managed by the Ministry of Culture of the Kazakh SSR. Then it was under republican control and was managed by the Ministry of Culture of the Republic of Kazakhstan. In 2012, it was withdrawn from the republican management of the Ministry of Culture and transferred to the municipal management of the Department of Culture of the Akimat of Almaty.

== See also ==
- List of museums in Kazakhstan
- List of music museums
- National Museum of the Republic of Kazakhstan
