= Panfilov's Twenty-Eight Guardsmen =

Fabricated WWII story of heroic Soviet soldiers

The Guardsmen's Memorial in Dubosekovo

The Panfilov Division's Twenty-Eight Guardsmen (Russian: Двадцать восемь гвардейцев дивизии Панфилова, romanized: Dvadtsat vosem gvardeytsev divizii Panfilova), commonly referred to simply as Panfilov's Twenty-Eight Guardsmen, Panfilov's Men (Russian: Панфиловцы, Panfilovtsy), or just the Twenty-Eight, refers to a group of soldiers who defended Moscow against the Nazis in 1941, about whom the Soviet press invented a heroic story for the purpose of motivating the army. Internally debunked already in Soviet times, the heroic legend was kept alive by the regime by classifying the related documents. Declassified and made public in the Glasnost period, the legend was brought back by a 2016 government-sponsored film.

The legend is based on a group of soldiers from the Red Army's 316th Rifle Division who took part in the 1941–1942 Battle of Moscow during World War II. According to an article published in the official Soviet army newspaper of the time, all were killed in action on 16 November 1941 after destroying 18 German tanks and stopping the enemy attack; the Twenty-Eight were collectively endowed with the title Hero of the Soviet Union. However, post-war investigation by Soviet authorities, carried out in 1948 and since declassified, revealed the story to be a fabrication. Neither German nor Soviet operational documents confirmed the claimed German casualties, and the Germans fulfilled their day's objectives well before the end of the day. After one of the supposedly dead men was arrested on suspicion of collaboration with the enemy and confessed to having "voluntarily" surrendered to German troops and to having later joined a German police force, it was discovered that not all twenty-eight were killed — six of the soldiers had survived and were still alive. Another one of the Guardsmen was arrested by the NKVD for allegedly "giving himself up to the enemy" and sent into a penal battalion. The findings were kept secret; the Twenty-Eight Guardsmen remained national heroes. In 1990 the files were declassified and the following year researchers published the truth. The myth returned in force in 2015, when a government-sponsored film project relaunched the fake narrative as historical truth, to great acclaim among the masses.

== Fighting ==
=== Background ===
On 30 September 1941, the Wehrmacht began its offensive on Moscow. By mid-November, German units were only 100 kilometers away from the USSR's capital.

The Red Army's 316th Rifle Division, a formation that consisted mostly of recruits from the Kazakh and Kirghiz Soviet Republics, commanded by General Ivan Panfilov, was a part of Konstantin Rokossovsky's 16th Army (Western Front). The division engaged in heavy fighting in October 1941 west of Volokolamsk, restraining the German offensive on Moscow. The division suffered heavy casualties but showed high morale and good fighting qualities. General Zhukov, the commander of the Western front, recommended that the division be given a Guards Division title and the Order of the Red Banner for its performance in the battles of 20—27 October. At the end of October the 316th division was forced out of Volokolamsk and took up positions eastward of the town. Only two battalions remained in the 1075th Rifle Regiment after the fighting in October, the 2nd and the 3rd; the 1st battalion was annihilated. It was believed that the 4th company of the 2nd battalion was also destroyed, so it was formed again, but a few days later remnants of the company managed to get out of the encirclement. The new 4th company (about 100 men from the former 1st battalion) was merged with the old one (about 30 men). Captain Gundilovich remained its commander and Vasily Klochkov its politruk.

=== Battle of Dubosekovo ===
The breakthrough of German troops at Volokolamsk. Red and blue arrows marked the advancement respectively of the 1st and 2nd combat groups of the 2nd Panzer Division. The dotted line indicates the approximate front line: pink: the starting position; purple: after the battles on November 16; blue: after the battles on November 17.

On the morning of 16 November, the 1075th Regiment's positions near the small Dubosekovo railroad station (crossing loop, literally raz'yezd) were attacked by units of the 2nd Panzer Division. The Germans formed three combat groups (Kampfgruppen) in the typical Panzerwaffe manner. Across the frozen earth, two of them maneuvered and attacked the weak positions on the left flank of the 1075th regiment. At 10 am (Moscow time) they already seized the villages of Petelino and Nelidovo and bypassed Dubosekovo station. No mentions were found in operational documents about heavy tank losses or an extremely stubborn resistance at this area. In the ensuing battle, the Kampfgruppen advanced further to the north, the 1075th Regiment was overwhelmed and forced to retreat from its positions. In later testimony, the 1075th's commander, Colonel Ilya Kaprov, said that his unit was engaged by German tanks and that the 4th Company of his 2nd Battalion, commanded by Captain Pavel Gundilovich, suffered over a hundred casualties in the fight against them and yet managed to destroy some tanks. Dubosekovo was occupied by the Germans until 20 December.

== Glorification ==
=== Krasnaya Zvezda articles ===
On 24 November 1941, Vasily Koroteev, a war reporter for the Red Army's Krasnaya Zvezda newspaper, traveled to the 16th Army headquarters to interview Rokossovsky. While in the command post, he met Commissar Sergei Egorov, the chief political officer of the 8th Guards Panfilov Division – the new name of the 316th Division, which was granted to honor the memory of its commanding general, who was killed in action on 18 November. Egorov told the reporter of a group of soldiers who, when faced by 54 German tanks, fought to the last and shot two from among their own who wished to surrender. The commissar added that he was not present at the event and heard of it from another political officer. He recommended that Koroteev write about it in the newspaper.

The article, entitled Panfilov's Guardsmen in the Battle for Moscow, was published in Krasnaya Zvezda on 27 November with the byline "West Front, 26 November. (By telegraph from our correspondent)". The report discussed the Panfilov Division's contribution to the fighting and mentioned that "A group of soldiers from the 5th company ... was attacked by a column of 54 enemy tanks, but they did not flinch", adding that a Commissar named Diev led the soldiers until all had been killed, but managed to keep the position in the face of the tank attack. Then their regiment came to the rescue and repulsed the attack of the German infantry regiment on "the Commissar Diev's position". Koroteev wrote that the enemy sustained eight hundred casualties and lost 18 tanks. Koroteev did not mention the date or place of the battle, or the exact size of the group.

On the following day, Krasnaya Zvezda ran an editorial on the front page by journalist Aleksander Krivitsky under the title "The Will of the 28 Fallen Heroes", dedicated solely to the heroic fight of Diev's group, which presented the same description of the events. Krivitsky added some historical reminiscences and the slogan "The Guard dies but does not surrender!" as a motivation for the soldiers. The exact time and place of the battle was still not named but the number of heroes was reported in this article. According to evidence from 1948, the editor of Krasnaya Zvezda, David Ortenberg, asked Koroteev how many soldiers took part in the clash. He arbitrarily replied that the company was incomplete and likely there were thirty men at all, including two traitors who wanted to surrender – thus reaching the number twenty-eight. Ortenberg decided that two would-be deserters were too many, reduced their number to one and passed this information to Krivitsky.

=== The Krivitsky mission ===
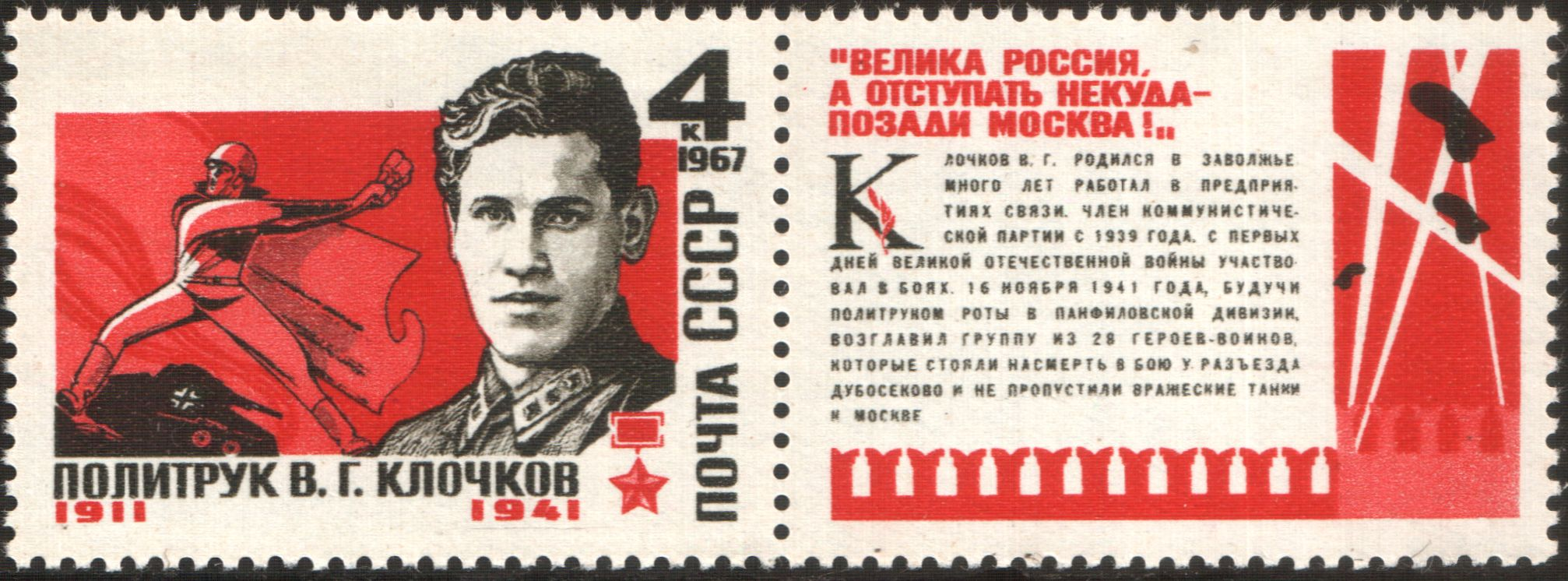
Commissar Vasily Klochkov: "Russia is a vast land, yet there is nowhere to retreat – Moscow is behind us!" on the Soviet postage stamp (1967)

The first article got a positive response from Soviet leaders, including Stalin himself, but there was a need to identify the names of the fallen heroes. Krivitsky visited the 8th Guard Division and tried to find witnesses to the fighting. He found that nobody could identify "Commissar Diev", and Colonel Kaprov told him that he had never heard of the action of the "28 Guardsmen". In spite of this, on 22 January 1942 Krivitsky published another article in Krasnaya Zvezda, in which he changed "5th company" to "4th" and made commissar Vasily Klochkov the main hero. Krivitsky also stated that "Diev" was a nickname of Klochkov, though nicknames were never used in reports in the Red Army. Klochkov's last words in the article were: "Russia is a vast land, yet there is nowhere to retreat – Moscow is behind us!"

The second most important hero in the article was Sergeant Dobrobabin. The whole group was called "Sergeant Dobrobabin's unit" and he allegedly commanded the first clash with enemy infantry on his own. In fact, Dobrobabin commanded only one squad of the rifle platoon and there was a man with higher rank, staff sergeant Gavriil Mitin, among the "28 Guardsmen".

In an article dated January 22, Krivitsky for the first time indicated the exact time and place of action – November 16, at Dubosekovo station, on the left flank of the 1075th Regiment. Now Soviet historians were forced to look for traces of the feat there, while documents drew the opposite picture – the rapid advance of the Germans. In fact, the fighting in the following days became much harder for the 2nd Panzer Division, and on November 18 they remained 25 kilometers from the target set for that day. According to the article, the Guardsmen killed 70 enemy "submachine gunners" and destroyed 18 tanks using their anti-tank rifles, grenades and Molotov cocktails. The article claimed that the last survivor from the group, soldier Ivan Natarov, described their exploits shortly before dying of his wounds in a field hospital. The names of the dead were listed in addition. The names were not known reliably: either these names were told to Krivitsky by the commander of the 4th company, Gundilovich, as he remembered them or were taken from some lists of killed and missed in action around the date of 16 November. Captain Gundilovich was killed in action in April 1942, so he could not comment on the testimony of Krivitsky, Kuzhebergenov, Dobrobabin, and others. During the winter, only three bodies were found near Dubosekovo station, and only three more were discovered after the snow melted.

The story of the Twenty-Eight gained wide publicity. In March 1942, Nikolai Tikhonov wrote a poem entitled "A Verse to the Twenty Eight Guardsmen". Other authors followed suit and several literary works dealing with the battle at Dubosekovo were published. Consequently, the Guardsmen became celebrated heroes throughout the Soviet Union.

== "Panfilov's Twenty-Eight Guardsmen" in the Soviet era ==
=== Kuzhebergenov's arrest ===
In May 1942, the NKVD arrested a Western Front soldier, Danil Kuzhebergenov, for allegedly "giving himself up to the enemy" by trying to surrender. When he was interrogated, the suspect claimed that he was the same Danil Kuzhebergenov that was listed as one of the Twenty-Eight Guardsmen. The NKVD discovered that he indeed served in the 4th Company of the 1075th Regiment's 2nd Battalion. Kuzhebergenov claimed that during 16 November he was knocked unconscious by an explosion and picked up by a German burial detail who presumed he was dead. He later managed to escape and joined General Dovator's Cavalry Division. The man was later recognized by other participants as one of the soldiers in Dubosekovo. The NKVD forced Kuzhebergenov to sign a confession in which he professed to having been an impersonator who was never present at the area of the battle and based his claims on material gleaned from the newspapers. Commissar Muhamedyarov wrote a letter in which he claimed to have erroneously ascribed Danil Kuzhebergenov as one of the Guardsmen instead of another soldier, Askar Kuzhebergenov, who was henceforth listed among the Twenty-Eight in official publications. According to the division's records, a soldier by that name joined it during January 1942 and was killed shortly after. Danil Kuzhebergenov was imprisoned on charges of impersonation and cowardice and later sent to a penal battalion. His criminal record as a "traitor to the Motherland" was never expunged.

On 21 July 1942, the Guardsmen were all posthumously awarded the title of Hero of the Soviet Union.

=== Afanasyev Report ===
In November 1947, the Kharkov Military Prosecutor's Office arrested Ivan Dobrobabin, a resident of the Kyrgyz town Kant, on suspicion of collaboration with the enemy. Dobrobabin told the investigators that he was one of the Panfilov Guardsmen. His claim was verified; he indeed was the same Ivan Dobrobabin who was listed as one of the dead in Dubosekovo. Dobrobabin claimed that during the clash on 16 November, he was captured by the Germans but managed to escape. He then decided to return to his native town of Perekop, in Ukraine, which was under German occupation. There, Dobrobabin joined the local Hilfspolizei and was made its chief. He was accused of participating in anti-partisan activity and of assisting the deportation of forced laborers to Germany. In 1944, when the German defeat was imminent, he fled his village and re-enlisted into the Red Army. Dobrobabin was convicted and sent to fifteen years in prison.

The Dobrobabin affair led to an official investigation of the Panfilov Guardsmen story. A military judge, Lieutenant-General Nikolai Afanasyev, supervised the process. When he interviewed Kaprov, the Colonel told him that although heavy fighting took place in Dubosekovo, the Guardsmen did not perform the deeds attributed to them by the press. When questioned, Krivitsky admitted that he made up most of the details which were published in his articles, including Klochkov's famous last words and the dying Natarov's tale – documents from the 1075th Regiment's staff later revealed that Ivan Natarov was killed two days before the battle. Ortenberg and Koroteev told the judge that their main motive was to boost the morale of the Soviet troops and therefore they published Egorov's story.

In addition to Kuzhubergenov, who the investigation confirmed to have been one of the Twenty-Eight, and Dobrobabin, four other surviving Guardsmen were located by the commission: Grigory Shemiakin and Illarion Vasilyev were injured severely on the 16 November incident and evacuated to hospitals; Dmitry Timofeev and Ivan Shadrin were taken prisoner but eventually repatriated to the Soviet Union. In his report, submitted to the Procurator General of the Soviet Union on 10 May 1948 and passed on to Joseph Stalin and Andrei Zhdanov, Afanasyev concluded that the Panfilov Guardsmen's last stand "did not occur. It was a pure fantasy."

=== Post-war era ===
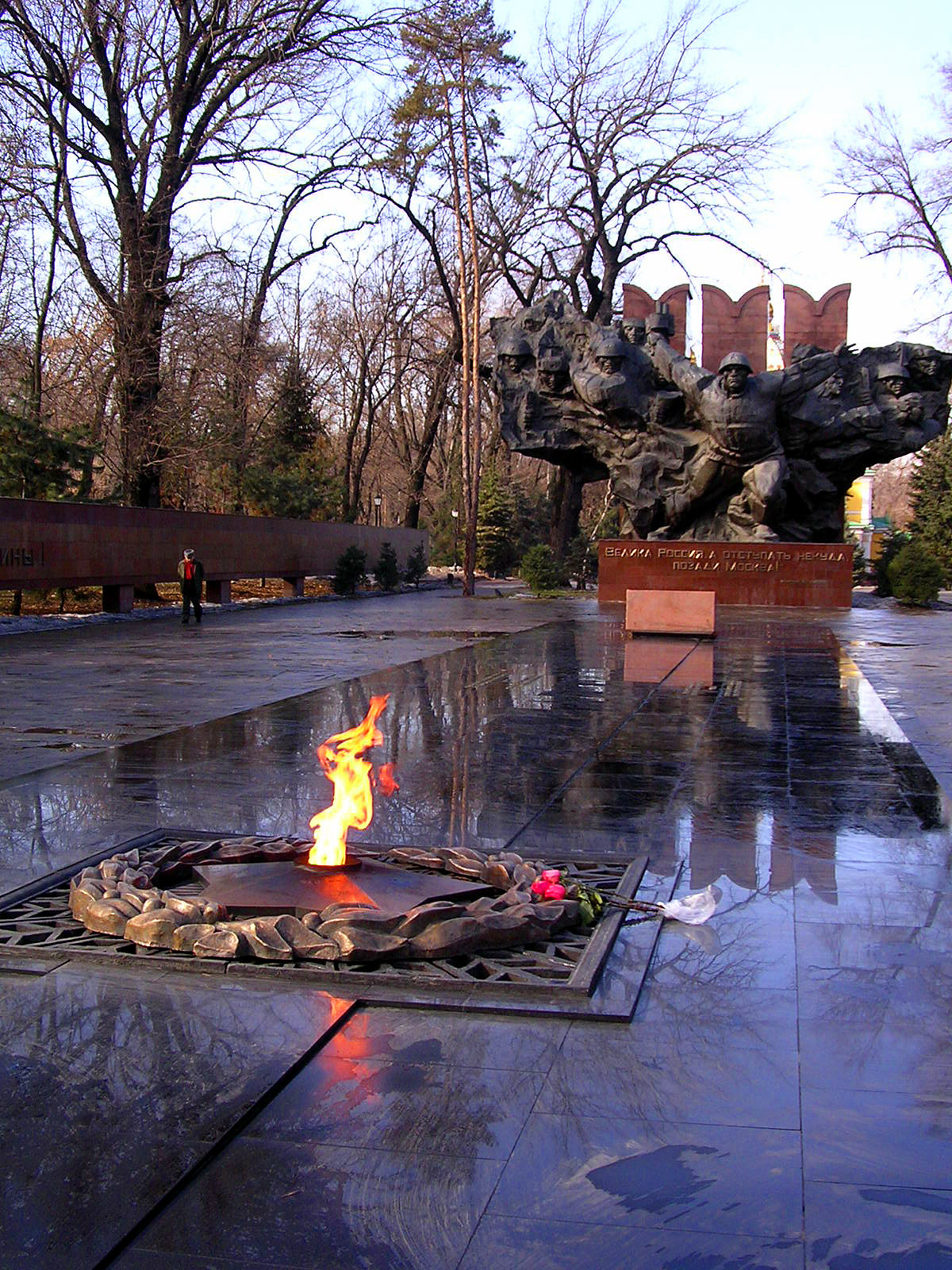
Monument to the Twenty-Eight Guardsmen in Almaty

In spite of the Afanasyev report, the wartime version of the events was adhered to. Memorials to the fallen heroes were built throughout the Soviet Union, including five 12-meter tall statues near the site of the battle and the Twenty-Eight Guardsmen Park in Alma Ata (Almaty). The municipal anthem of Moscow makes a reference to the city's "twenty-eight brave sons". Some Soviet military historians tried to reconcile "the Feat of the 28" with the known facts about the real course of hostilities. Thus, in the official six-volume "History of the Great Patriotic War" by Pospelov it was stated that "28 heroes" were part of the 1077th Regiment. This regiment did hold its ground in the battle on November 16, but these positions were 20 kilometers away from the Dubosekovo station.

In 1966, the popular Soviet literary magazine Novyi mir published an article entitled "Легенды и факты" ("Legends and facts") by V. Kardin. There were some serious questions posed of Krivitsky and the canonized version of "28 heroes". Kadrin named several survivors and asked why no further studies has been made. Such thoughts were slapped down personally by Leonid Brezhnev, Soviet Union's Head of State: "Some of our authors even say that ... there were no 28 Panfilov men, ... that this fact was perhaps invented, that Klochkov did not exist, and neither did his appeal 'There is nowhere to retreat – we have our backs to Moscow!' These are slanders against ... the heroic history of our party and Soviet people."

During the Perestroika period, the still-living Ivan Dobrobabin petitioned the Military Prosecutor General for rehabilitation, claiming that he never hurt anyone during his service in the Hilfspolizei. Dobrobabin's plea attracted media attention to the case, which resulted in the eventual declassification of the Afanasyev report.

==== Memorials ====
- Park of 28 Panfilov Guardsmen, Almaty, Kazakhstan
- Guardsmen's Memorial, Dubosekovo – 10-meter statues of six figures.
- Monument to Panfilov's Guardsmen, Moscow – was a statue, now a wall

== Contemporary Russia ==
In June 2015, Russian State Archive director Sergei Mironenko, citing historical documents, publicly stated that the story was in fact a myth. He earned a sharp rebuke from Culture Minister Vladimir Medinsky. Shortly afterwards, the Archive posted online the results of the 1948 investigation by Soviet military prosecutors, which concluded that journalists from the military newspaper Krasnaya Zvezda had concocted the story's details. Mironenko was subsequently removed from his post. Medinsky stated that "It is my deep conviction that even if this story was invented from the start to the finish ..., it is a sacred legend which it's simply impossible to besmirch. And people who try to do that are total scumbags."

== The Twenty-Eight Guardsmen ==
=== Killed in action ===
- Nikolai Ananiev (b. 19 November 1912)
- Nikolai Belashev (b. 1911)
- Grigory Bezrodnikh (b. 1909)
- Yakov Bondarenko (b. 1905) – According to hospital documents, he was wounded on 5 December and died on 6 December 1941
- Piotr Dutov (b. 6 August 1916)
- Piotr Emtsov (b. 14 May 1909)
- Nursutbai Esebulatov (b. 1913)
- Dmitri Kalenik (b. 1910)
- Vasily "Diev" Klochkov (b. 8 March 1911)
- Grigory Konkin (b. 1911)
- Alikbai Kosaev (b. 11 May 1905)
- Abram Kriuchkov (b. 1910)
- Nikolai Maximov (b. 5 July 1911)
- Nikita Mitchenko (b. 3 April 1910)
- Gavril Mitin (b. 1908)
- Ivan Moskalenko (b. 1912)
- Ivan Natarov (b. 1910) – According to the combat report of the 1075th Rifle Regiment he was killed two days before, on 14 November, along with Dusheinkul Shapokov
- Grigory Petrenko (b. 22 November 1909)
- Musabek Sengirbayev (b. 10 March 1917)
- Ivan Shepetkov (b. 1910)
- Duishenkul Shopokov (b. 19 May 1915) – According to the combat report of the 1075th Rifle Regiment he was killed two days before, on 14 November, along with Ivan Natarov
- Nikolai Trofimov (b. 9 May 1915)

=== Survived ===
- Dimitry Timofeev (5 February 1907 – 6 June 1950)
- Ilarion Vasilyev (5 November 1910 – 6 October 1969)
- Grigory Shemiakin (25 December 1906 – 25 October 1973)
- Danil Kuzhubergenov (1917 – 1976)
- Ivan Shadrin (17 June 1913 – 21 October 1985)
- Ivan Dobrobabin (21 June 1913 – 19 December 1996)

== Popular culture ==
28 panfilovtsev is a film about Panfilov's 28 men, produced by Libyan Palette Studios together with Gaijin Entertainment. The film, released on 24 November 2016, was partially funded by crowdfunding and also received funding from the Russian government. . Russian state media showed president Vladimir Putin watching the film with Kazakh president Nursultan Nazarbayev.

== See also ==
- Ghost of Kyiv
