= Panfilov Park (Almaty) =

Park in Kazakhstan

28 Panfilov Guardsmen Park
- 28 гвардияшы-панфиловшылар атындағы саябақ (Kazakh); Парк имени 28 гвардейцев-панфиловцев (Russian)
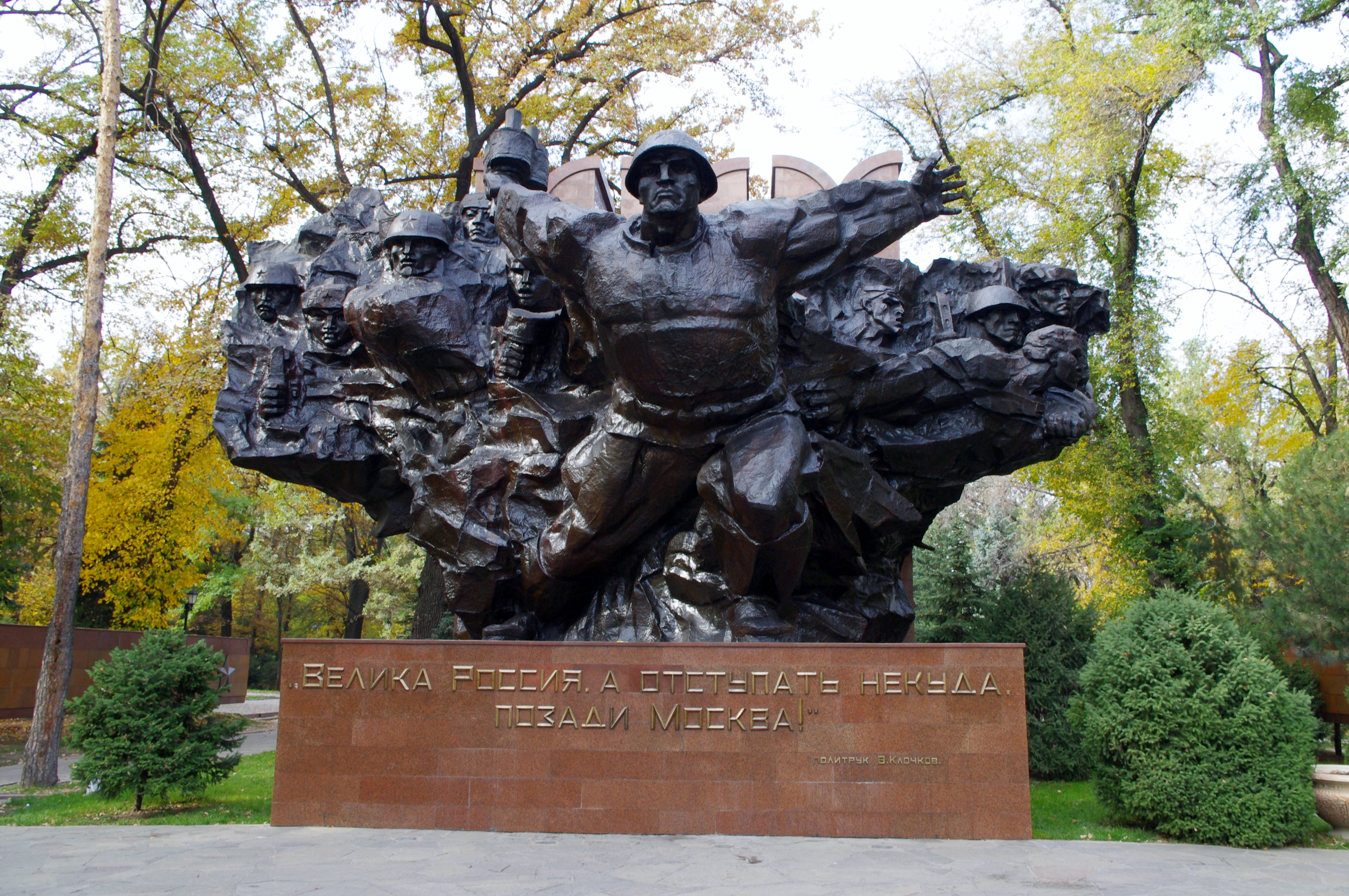
- Entrance to the Park, with the WWII Monument.

- Location within Kazakhstan
- Type: Urban park
- Location: Almaty, Kazakhstan
- Coordinates: 43°15′32″N 76°57′11″E
- Area: 44 acres (18 ha)
- Created: 1870s

The 28 Panfilov Guardsmen Park (Kazakh: 28 гвардияшы-панфиловшылар атындағы саябақ, romanized: 28 gvardiaşı-panfilovşylar atyndağy saiabaq; Russian: Парк имени 28 гвардейцев-панфиловцев, romanized: Park imeni 28 gvardeytsev-panfilovtsev) is an urban park near the Ascension Cathedral in east-central Almaty, Kazakhstan. The park honors the Panfilov's Twenty-Eight Guardsmen, 28 soldiers from an Alma-Ata infantry unit of the Red Army who reportedly died during World War II in the Battle of Moscow. Named after Soviet General Ivan Panfilov, they are remembered for delaying the German advance into the Soviet capital of Moscow during Operation Barbarossa. An eternal flame commemorates the fallen soldiers, situated in front of a black monument honouring troops from all 15 Soviet republics.

The park covers an area of 18 hectares and is covered by smooth paths and alleys that run through a mixed deciduous grove comprising perennial oaks, elms, aspens, maples, poplars, pines, and firs. The park's historical significance and architectural ensemble make it a point of interest for both residents and tourists.

== History ==
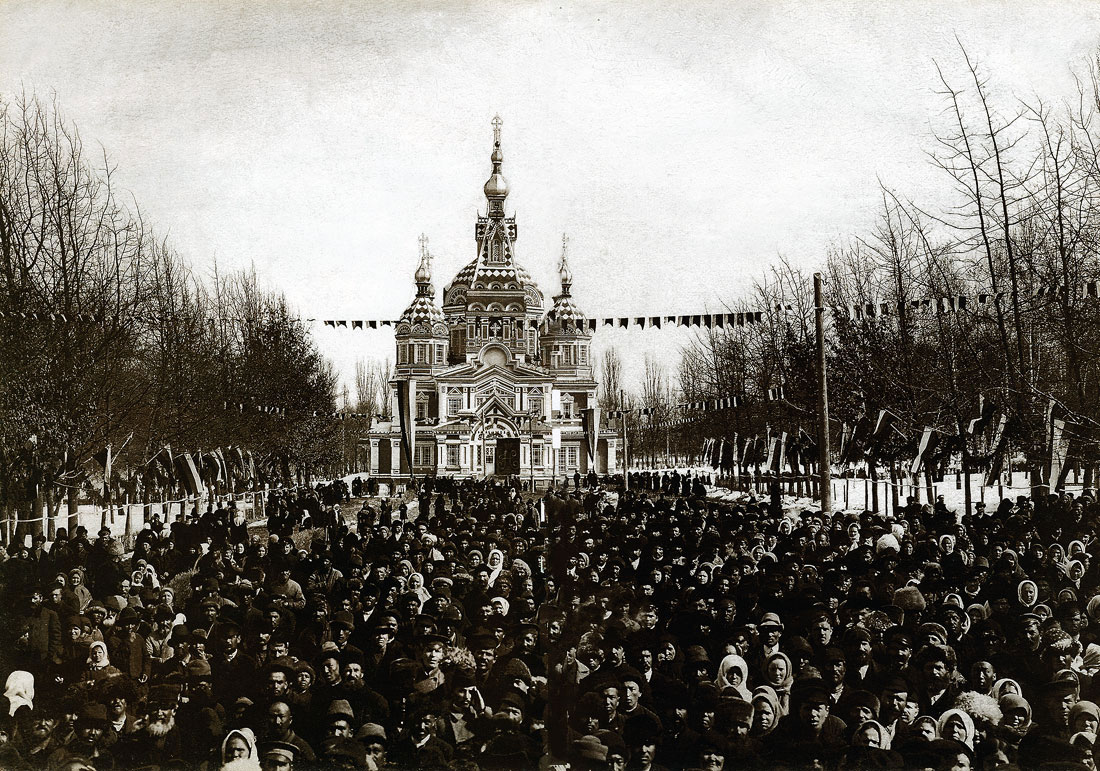
Ascension Cathedral during the Romanov Tercentenary, 1913

The park was founded in the 1870s on the site of a Cossack village cemetery, originally named Starokladbischensky Park (Russian: Старокладбищенский парк, lit. 'Old Cemetery Park'), which was destroyed in 1921. The only preserved graves belong to Leonilla Kolpakovsky, buried in 1860, and her grandson Vladimir Basilevsky, buried in 1882; the gravestone was restored in 2011. Mass grave memorials for victims of the 1887 earthquake are now lost. The park was later connected to a Catholic Garden and renamed Urban Garden. In 1899, to commemorate the 100th anniversary of Russian poet Alexander Pushkin (1799–1837), the park was renamed Pushkin Garden. Between 1904 and 1907, construction occurred on one of Almaty’s few surviving Tsarist-era buildings. In 1913, it hosted an agricultural and industrial exhibition for the Romanov Tercentenary, organized by military engineer Andrey Zenkov. New buildings were constructed, with 28 state-owned and 15 private pavilions showcasing Kazakh national art and crafts. Nearby, the Ascension Cathedral and the Verny City Council were equipped with electricity, enhancing the Garden City image.

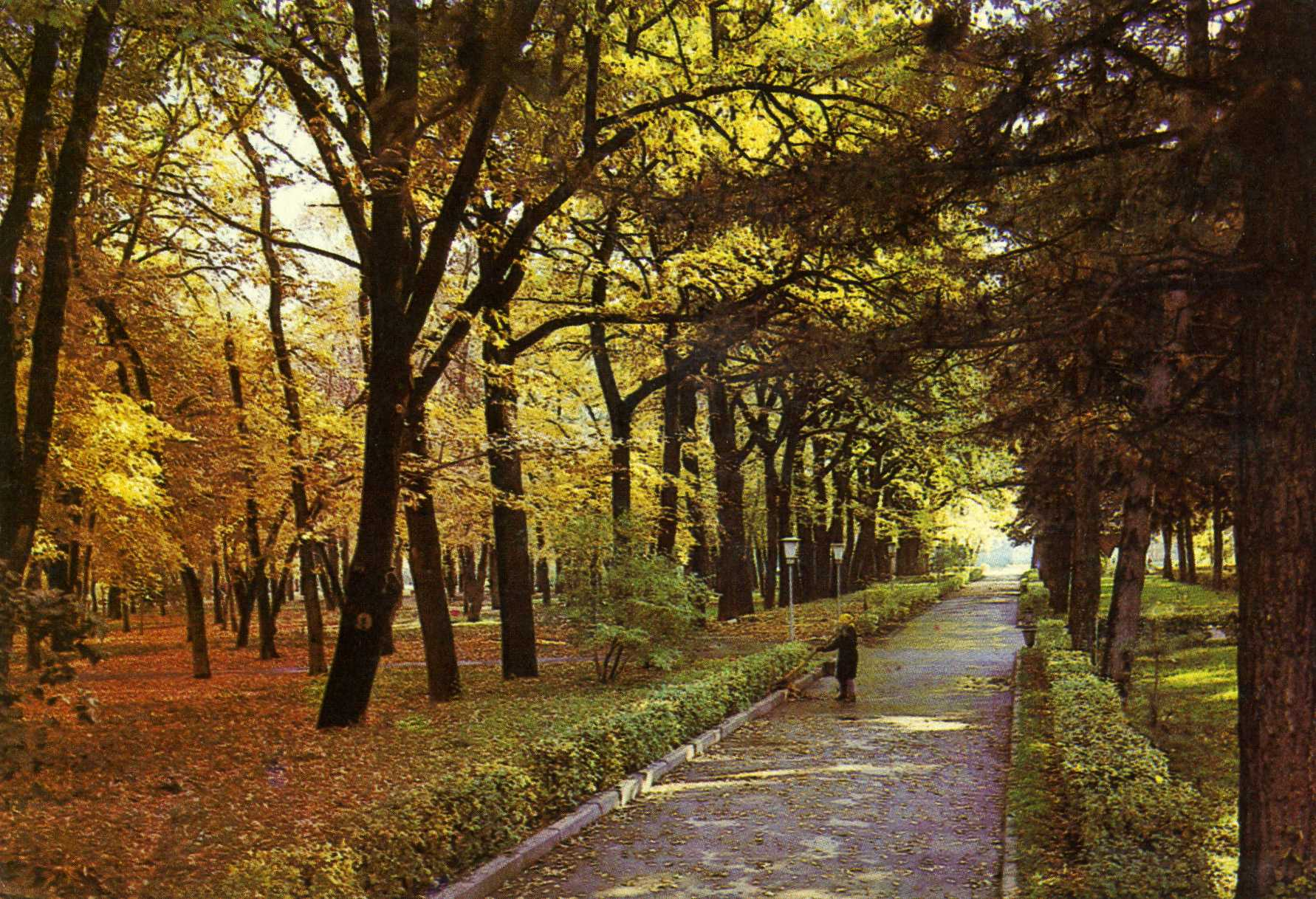
Park during the fall, 1982.

In 1919, the park was renamed Park of the Fallen Heroes in honor of those who fought in the Russian Civil War, later changing to Lenin Local Park due to a prohibition on urban cemeteries. By 1927, as Alma-Ata became the capital of Soviet Kazakhstan, it was renamed Federation of Soviet Republics.

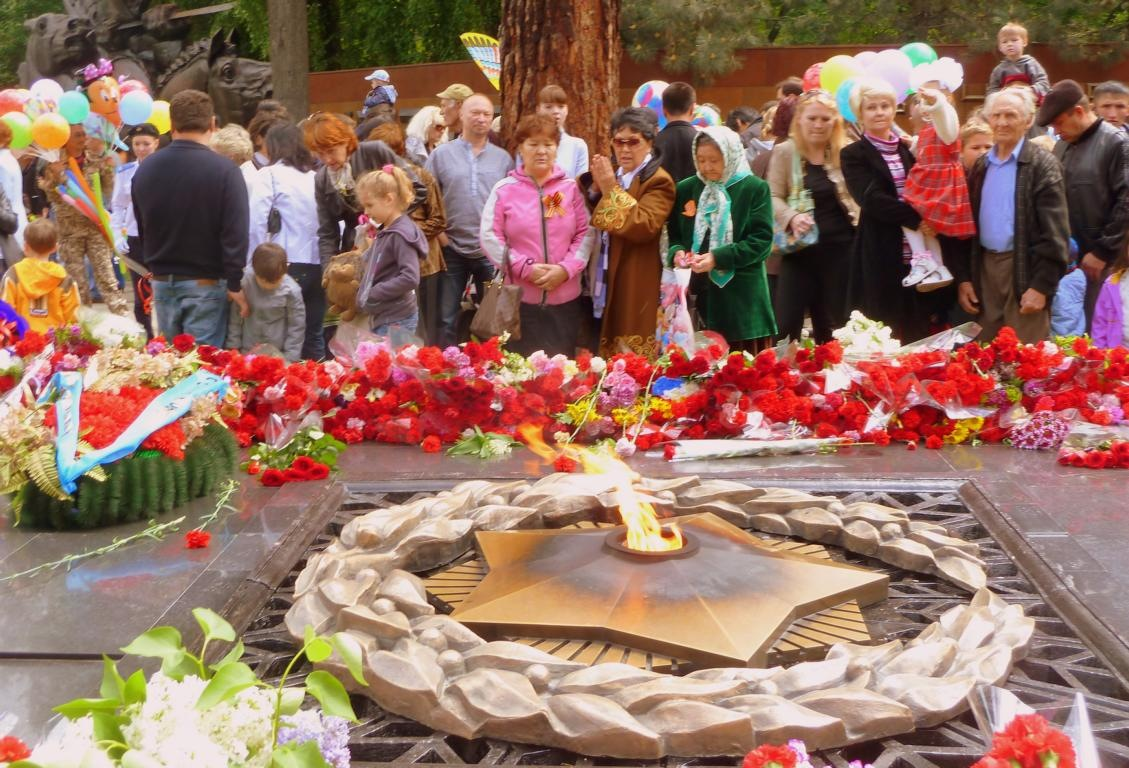
Eternal flame at the park during Victory Day, 9 May 2012

On 5 May 1942, the park was renamed to 28 Panfilov Guardsmen Park in honour of the Panfilov's Twenty-Eight Guardsmen of the 1075 regiment of the 312th rifle division, who defended Moscow in November 1941. The park includes historical buildings from the early to mid-20th century, such as the Ascension Cathedral, which was built without nails, the Kazakh Museum of Folk Musical Instruments, and the House of Officers. Today, the park is a popular destination for locals and tourists. During Victory Day celebrations, Almaty residents lay flowers and wreaths in memory of those who died in World War II. Zenkov played a crucial role in the park's development and in improving Almaty. In 1982, the park's significant sites, including the museum, Ascension Cathedral, and Memorial of Glory, were listed as historical and cultural monuments of republican significance in Kazakhstan.

== Renaming ==
There was a suggestion to rename the current existing name for the park due to the July 2015 publications by the State Archive of the Russian Federation that the military newspaper Krasnaya Zvezda had concocted the story's details of the heroic story. However, there are no considerations by the city officials in renaming the park.

== Sights ==
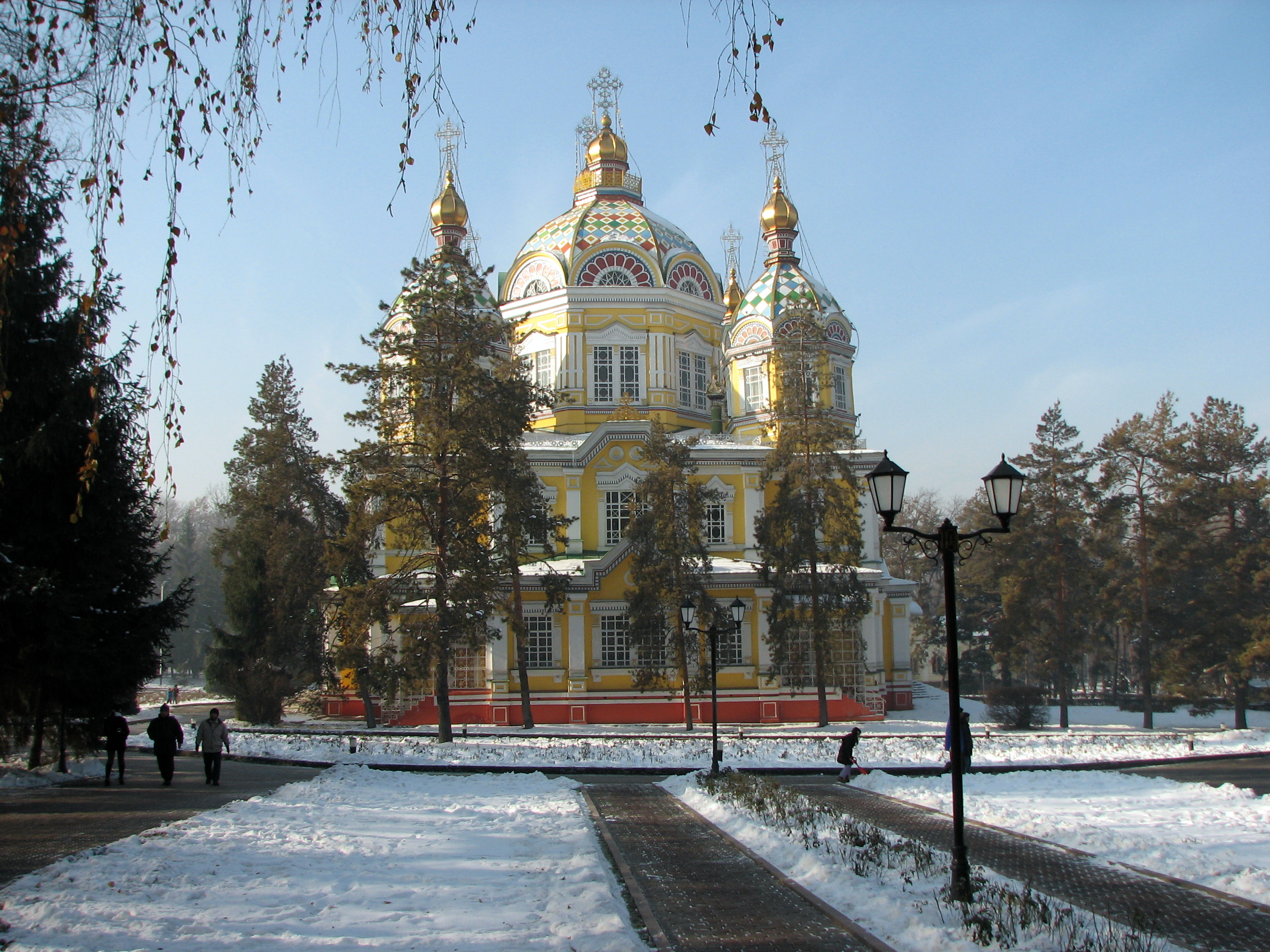
Ascension Cathedral during winter, 2005

=== Ascension Cathedral ===
Designed by Andrei Pavlovich Zenkov in 1904, a cathedral was built entirely of wood with the belfry being erected on 14 September 1906. The inner structure of the cathedral was made in the artistic workshops of Moscow and Kiev. The iconostasis was painted by N. Khludov. The cathedral survived the 1911 earthquake. After the Russian Revolution the cathedral was used to house the Central State Museum of the Kazakh Soviet Socialist Republic. From 1930 to 1940 it was used by important public organizations. The first radio transmitters in Almaty were situated in the cathedral's belfry. Restoration work on the cathedral began in 1973 and lasted until 1976. In May 1995 control of the cathedral was returned to the Russian Orthodox Church, and after additional restoration work it was reopened for religious services in 1997.

=== Kazakh Museum of Folk Musical Instruments ===
Kazakh Museum of Folk Musical Instruments

In the eastern part of the park, there is the museum of national musical instruments. This wooden building was erected in 1908, simultaneously with Ascension Cathedral. During the period, the military leadership of the Turkestan governor-generalship once met here for ceremonies and state receptions. Later the building was used as the House of Officers until 1980, when the museum of national musical instruments of Kazakhstan was opened here.

The museum was named after known Kazakh musician of 19th and 20th century Ykylas, who promoted the purity of folk culture and preservation of various national instruments. Today, there are more than 1000 items of instruments in collection of the museum, which are divided into 60 types of Kazakh national musical instruments. The collection also includes instruments which were owned by famous singers, improvisers, and composers. The most ancient exhibits are dated back to the 17th century. From the outside, the building is made of wood and resembles the traditional Russian building. On the inside the decoration corresponds to classic Kazakh national patterns. And in front of the building the sculpture of Kazakh bow instrument, Narkobyz is erected. Besides the view of all instruments, the visitors can listen to the sounding of these instruments in the performance of folk ensemble Sazgen.

== Monuments ==
=== Memorial of Glory ===
Memorial of Glory was built in 1975 to the 30th anniversary of the Victory in the Park of the 28 Panfilov Guardsmen from the east side, in the same year the Eternal Flame was lit. The opening of the memorial complex of the four parts was held 8 May 1975. The first part - the high relief "Oath" (on the left side) - is dedicated to the young fighters for Soviet power in Kazakhstan. The central part of the triptych, The Deed, depicts the images of Panfilov heroes who defended Moscow with their breasts. To the right is the composition "Trumpeting Glory", which gives the whole memorial an optimistic sound, its images embody the anthem of triumphant life. Near the Eternal Flame there are massive cubes of labradorite, under which capsules with soil from the heroic cities are immured. It is a monument of art, architecture and history (included in the register on 20 April 1980), included in the Almaty State Historical-Architectural and Memorial Reserve (decree of the Council of Ministers of the Republic of Kazakhstan № 46 25 November 1993).

=== Monument to Bauyrzhan Momyshuly ===
Opened on 10 December 2010 from the north side of the park. The authors of the monument are sculptor Nurlan Dalbai and architect Rasul Satybaldiev. The height of the monument is 6 meters.

=== Monument to Ivan Panfilov ===
Monument to Ivan Panfilov was established in 1968. It is located on the south side of the park. The authors are sculptor B.A. Tulekov and architect T.K. Basenov. The monument-bust is cast in bronze. The height is 2 meters, the pedestal is rectangular of gray granite. It is located at the intersection of Kazybek bi Street and Dostyk Avenue, which starts directly from the park. Behind the monument begins an alley of heroes-panfilovs, which crosses the entire park. In the center of the alley installed granite pedestals on both sides of which are the names of the 28 Panfilov Guardsmen.

The monument is located on a five-stepped stylobate of pink processed granite. On the obverse of the pedestal is a plaque with the years of life, name, surname and rank of Hero of the Soviet Union, Major-General I. Panfilov. The total height of the monument is 3.65 meters. The monument is listed in the state list of monuments of history and culture of local importance of the city of Alma-Ata in the updated version of 2010

=== Monument to Tokash Bokin ===
Installed in 1980 on the west side of the park. Sculptor - B. A. Abishev, architect - Sh. E. Valikhanov. Made in the form of a bust 4.8 meters high.

The belted figure of the revolutionary is carved from gray granite. The composition is symmetrical, axial. Both sides of the monument have stepped disclosures; the western one has the inscription: "Tokash Bokin", the eastern one - the symbol "sickle and hammer" and a five-pointed star as a symbol of Soviet power. The monument is installed on a one-stage stylobate. The monument is oriented to the street Kunayev, there is no direct exit from the park to the monument. Originally, a small bust-monument to Tokash Bokin was erected on this spot in 1967, for the celebration of the 50th anniversary of the October Revolution. The sculptor of the monument was O. Prokopyeva. However, as time passed, the need for a new monument arose. The first version of the bust was dismantled in 1979. The monument is listed in the state list of historical and cultural monuments of local importance in the city of Alma-Ata, as revised in 2010.

=== Monument to Afghan warriors ===
Monument to the Kazakhstani soldiers who died during the civil war in Afghanistan as part of the Limited Contingent of Soviet Forces was opened on 15 February 2003 next to the Memorial of Glory. The sculptor was Kazbek Satybaldin, architects Tokhtar Yeraliev and Vladimir Sidorov. The opening of the monument was timed to coincide with the 14th anniversary of the withdrawal of Soviet troops from Afghanistan. The names and surnames of 69 Alma-Ata citizens who did not return from the Afghan war were carved at the foot of the monument. In total more than 22 thousand Kazakhstani soldiers participated in operations in this Central Asian country.

Three bronze figures of soldiers rise on a granite pedestal. The polished granite pedestal is raised on a broad horizontal plane of four rectangular plates, symbolizing the stylobate - tombstone. On it are four columns of names, laid out in relief bronze letters. A volumetric image of a soldier's helmet on top of a machine gun and a laurel branch in front of the rows of names lists complete the composition of the memorial. The monument is listed in the 2010 edition of the state list of historical and cultural monuments of local importance in Alma-Ata.

== Gallery ==
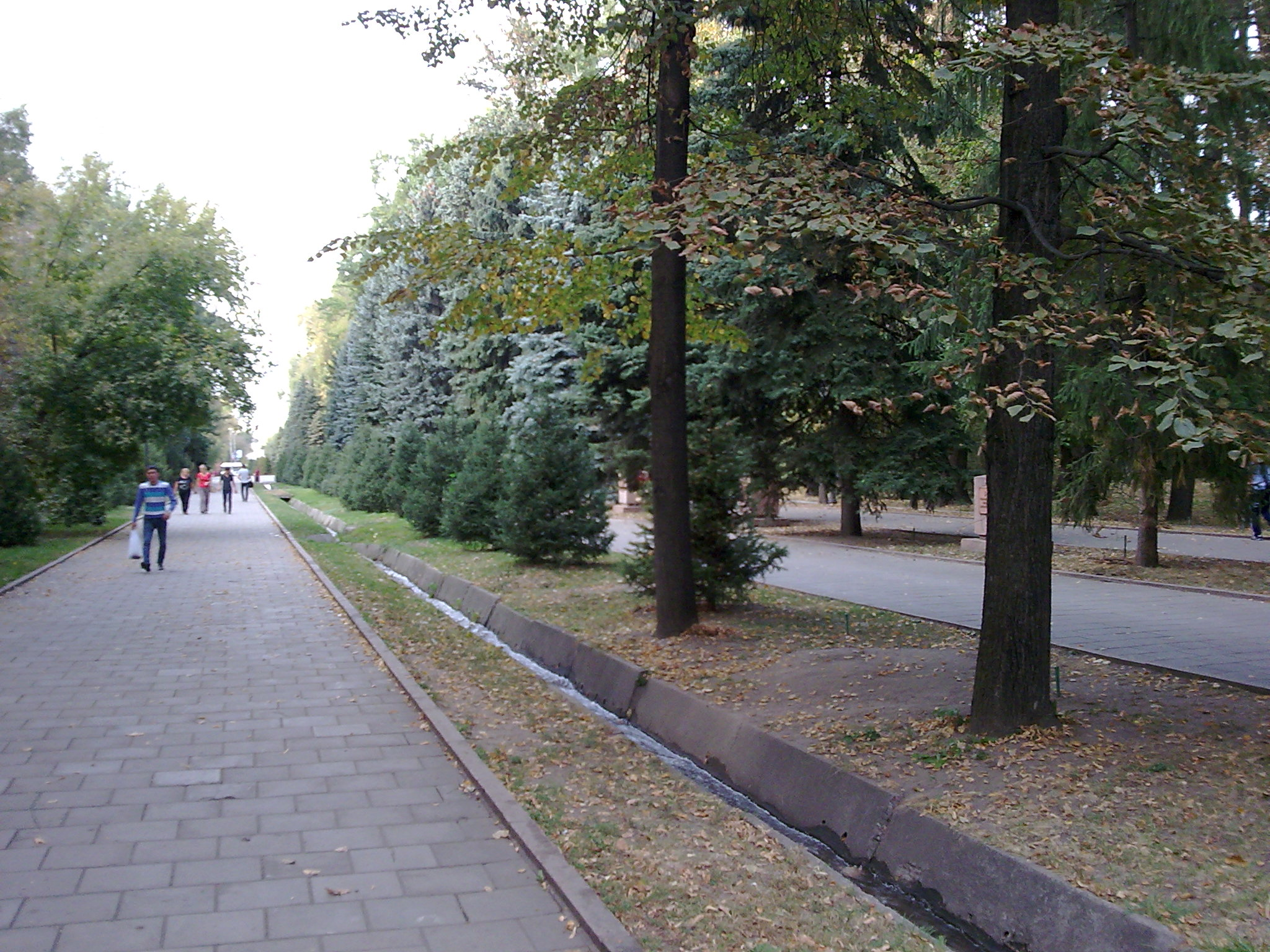
Park's canals

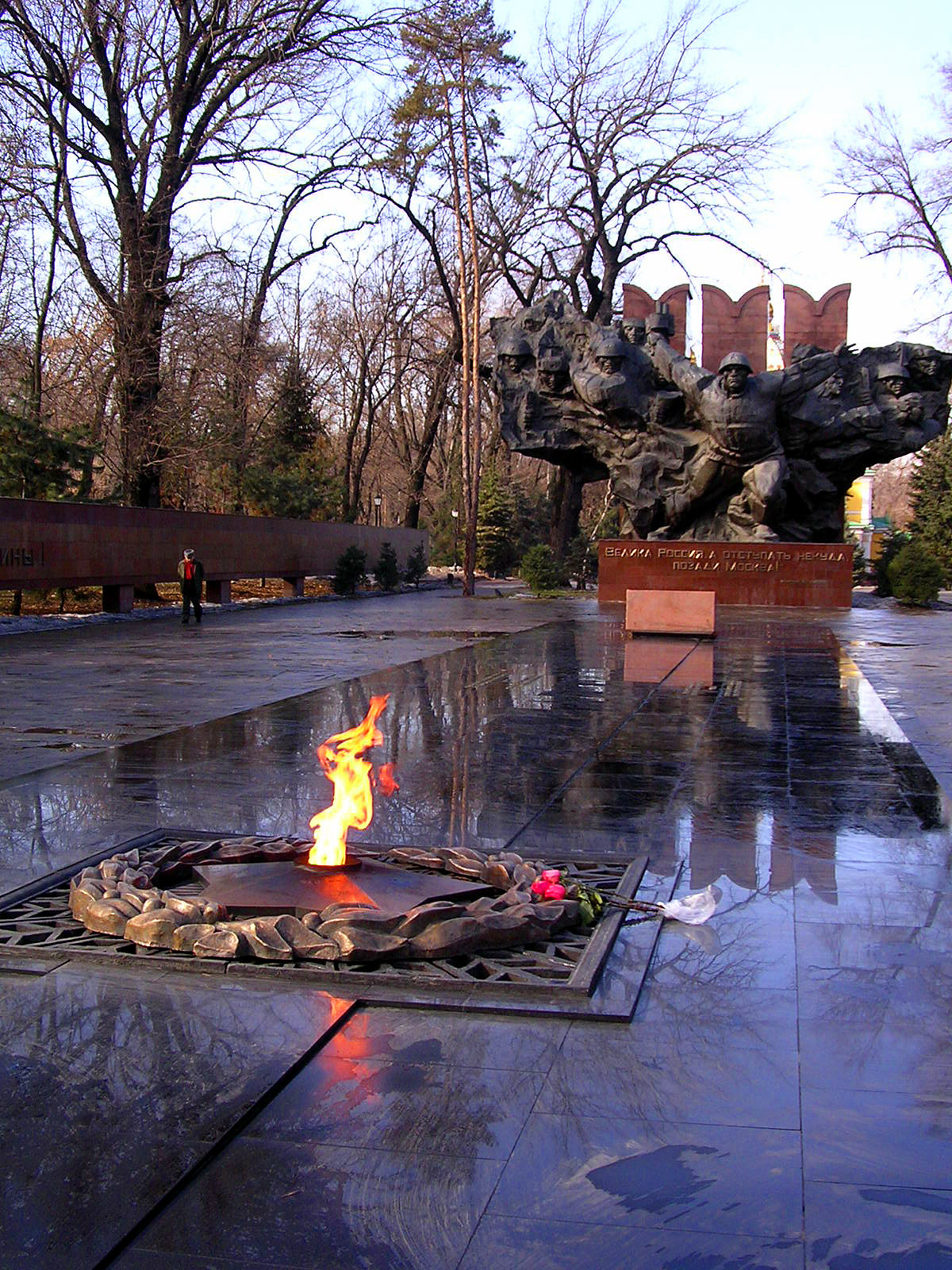
Eternal flame in front of the sculpture

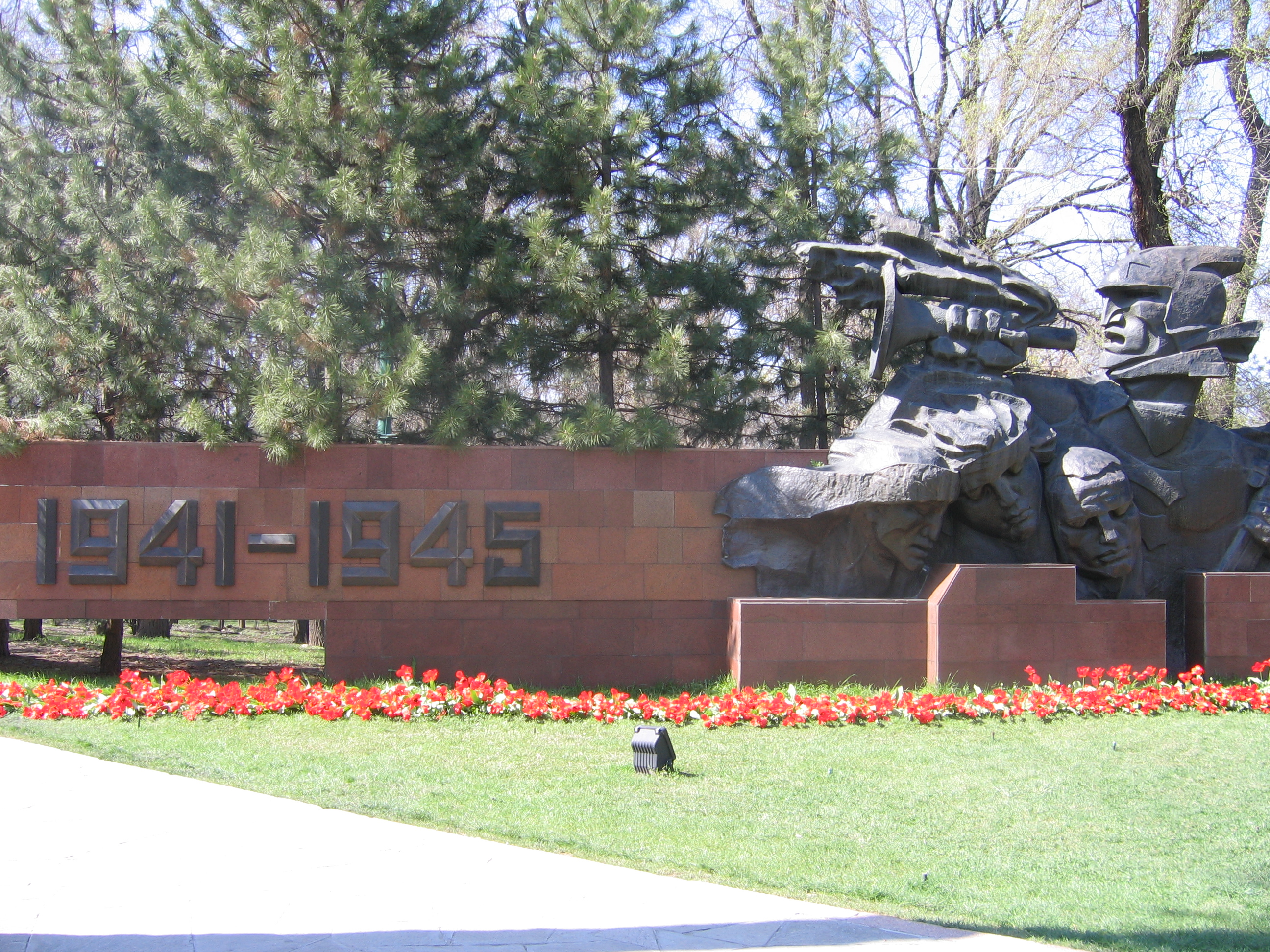
Second World War Monument

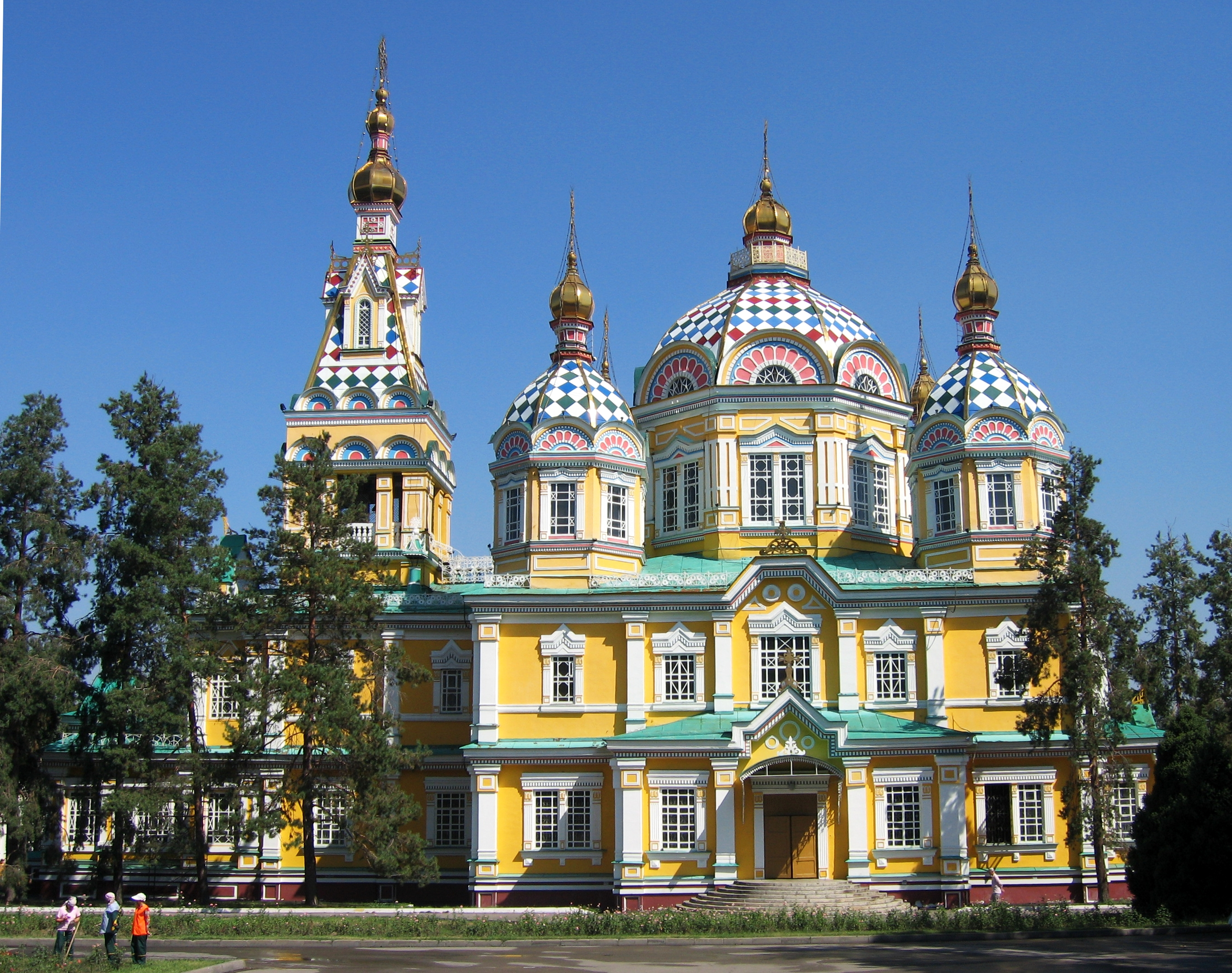
Ascension Cathedral today

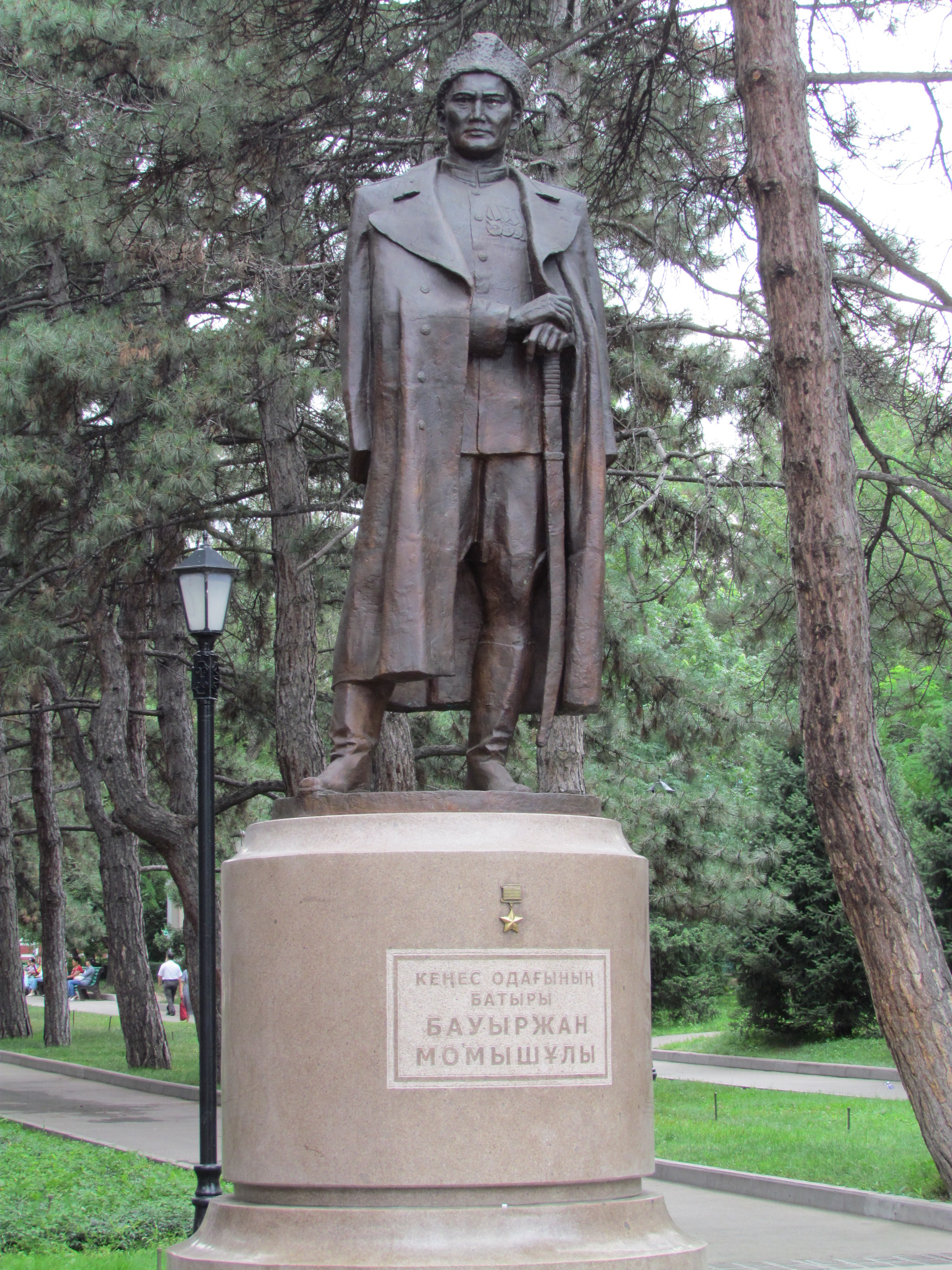
Bauyrjan Momyshuly Monument
