= Memorial of Glory (Almaty) =

Memorial complex in Almaty, Kazakhstan

Coordinates: 43°15′32″N 76°57′19″E

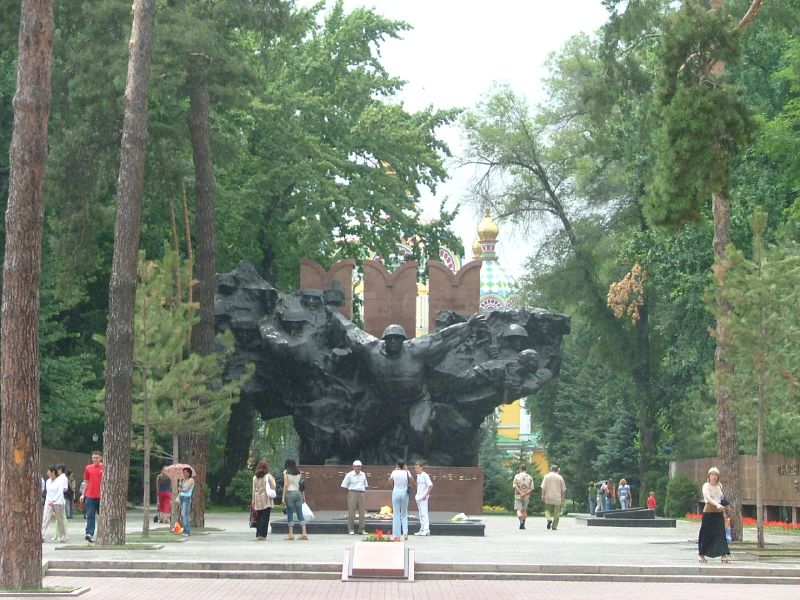
- Interactive map of Memorial of Glory
- Location: Almaty city, Kazakhstan
- Opening date: 1975

The Memorial of Glory is a memorial complex in Almaty, Kazakhstan, installed in the Park named after 28 Panfilov Guardsmen for the 30th anniversary of victory in the Great Patriotic War. The eternal flame was lit as part of the complex.

== History ==
In 1974, architects T.K. Basenov, R.A. Seydalin and V.N. Kim created a project for the memorial complex, which was supposed to be located in the park named after 28 Panfilov Guardsmen. It was planned to build a triptych dedicated to the establishment of Soviet power in Kazakhstan and the victory of the Soviet people in the Great Patriotic War, as well as a special pedestal for the eternal flame. On May 8, 1975 the memorial complex was solemnly opened. The authors of the sculptures were V. V. Andryushchenko and A.E. Artimovich.

In 2012, the memorial and its main elements were restored for the first time in 30 years. At the same time, there were significant flaws in the reconstruction. For example, the new slabs on the memorial do not correspond in color and structure to those that were originally located there; the letters on the steles were fixed unevenly. Separately, public organizations note that the Semipalatinsk pines were cut down, and new ones were not planted instead, which violated the architectural and natural composition.

== Monument description ==
The memorial complex is a triptych:

The alto relievo "Oath" is an image of a young Red Army man leading the horses of his fallen comrades. It is located on the left side of the main axis of the memorial complex. In front of the high relief under the massive cubes of labradorite there are capsules with the earth of the cities-heroes.

Alto relievo "The feat" depicts the images of heroes-panfilovs who defended Moscow. The bas-relief on the podium made by copper embossing technique recreates the representatives of the 15 Soviet republics in the outline of the map of the Soviet Union. The words of Panfilov's political commander were carved on the podium: "Russia is great and there is no retreat. Moscow is behind us!".

Alto relievo "Trumpeting Glory" represents images that embody the anthem of triumphant life. It is located on the right side of the main axis of the memorial complex. In front of the high relief under massive cubes of labradorite there are capsules with the earth of the cities-heroes.

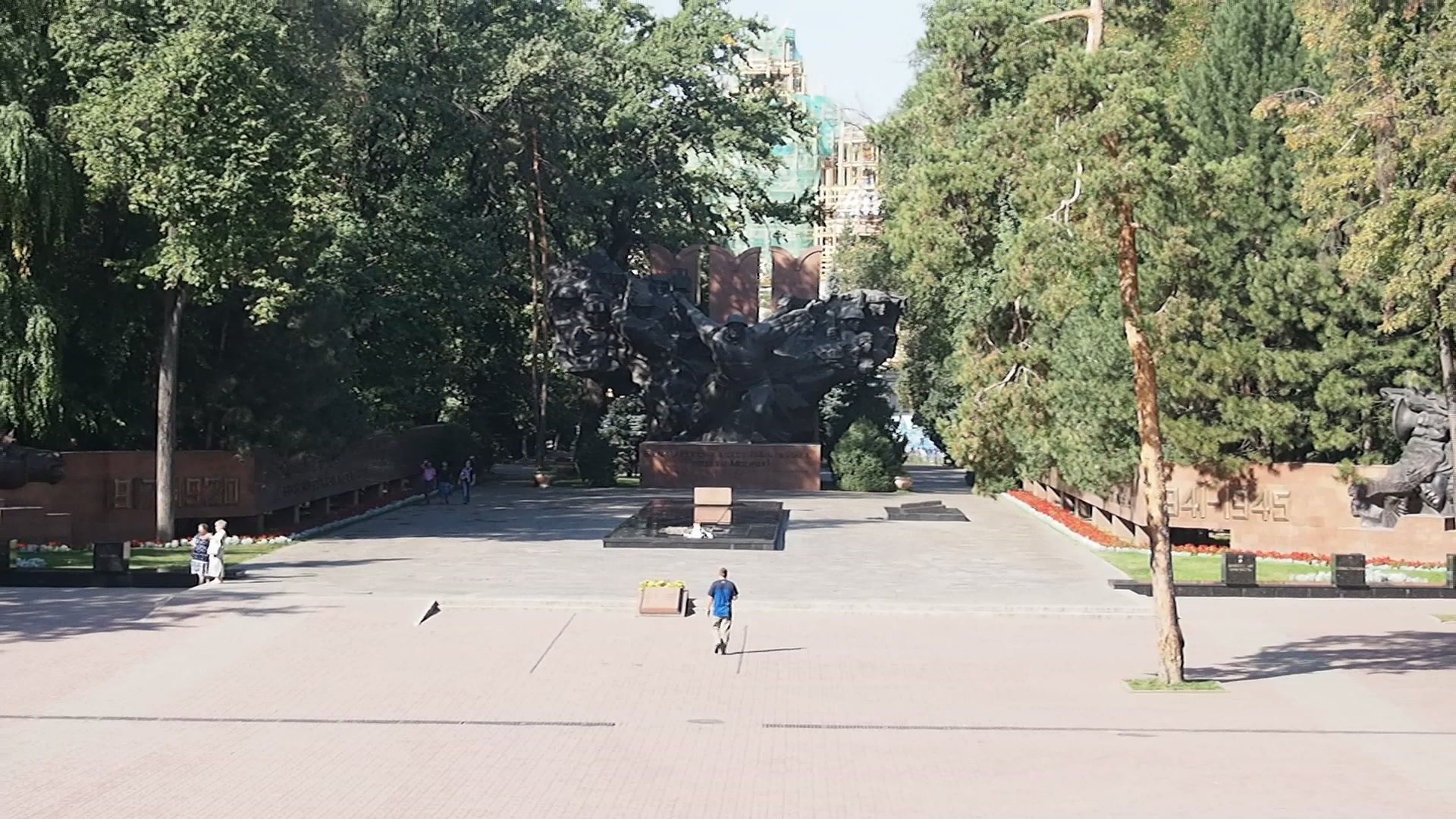
General view of the memorial

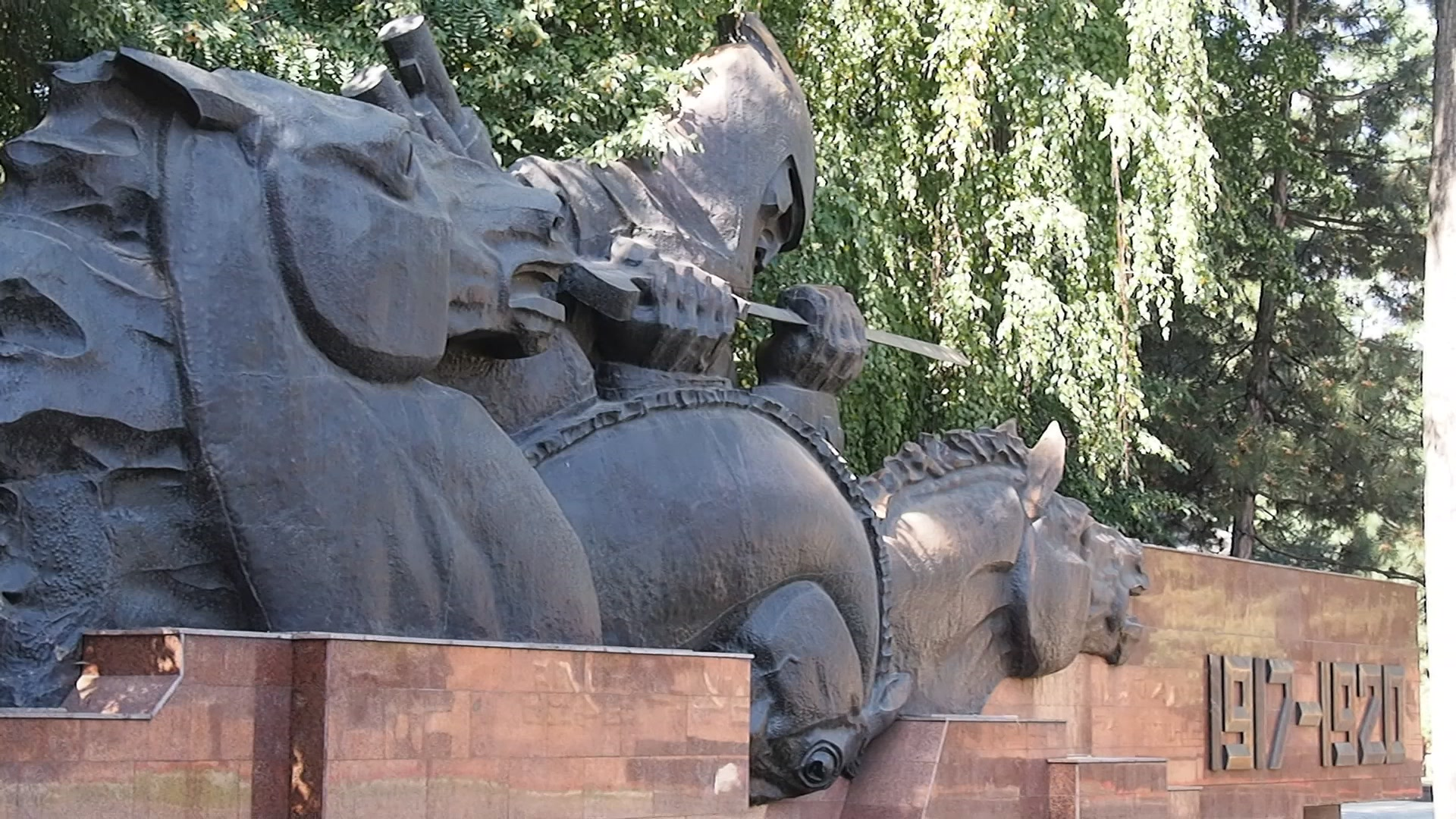
The alto relievo "Oath"

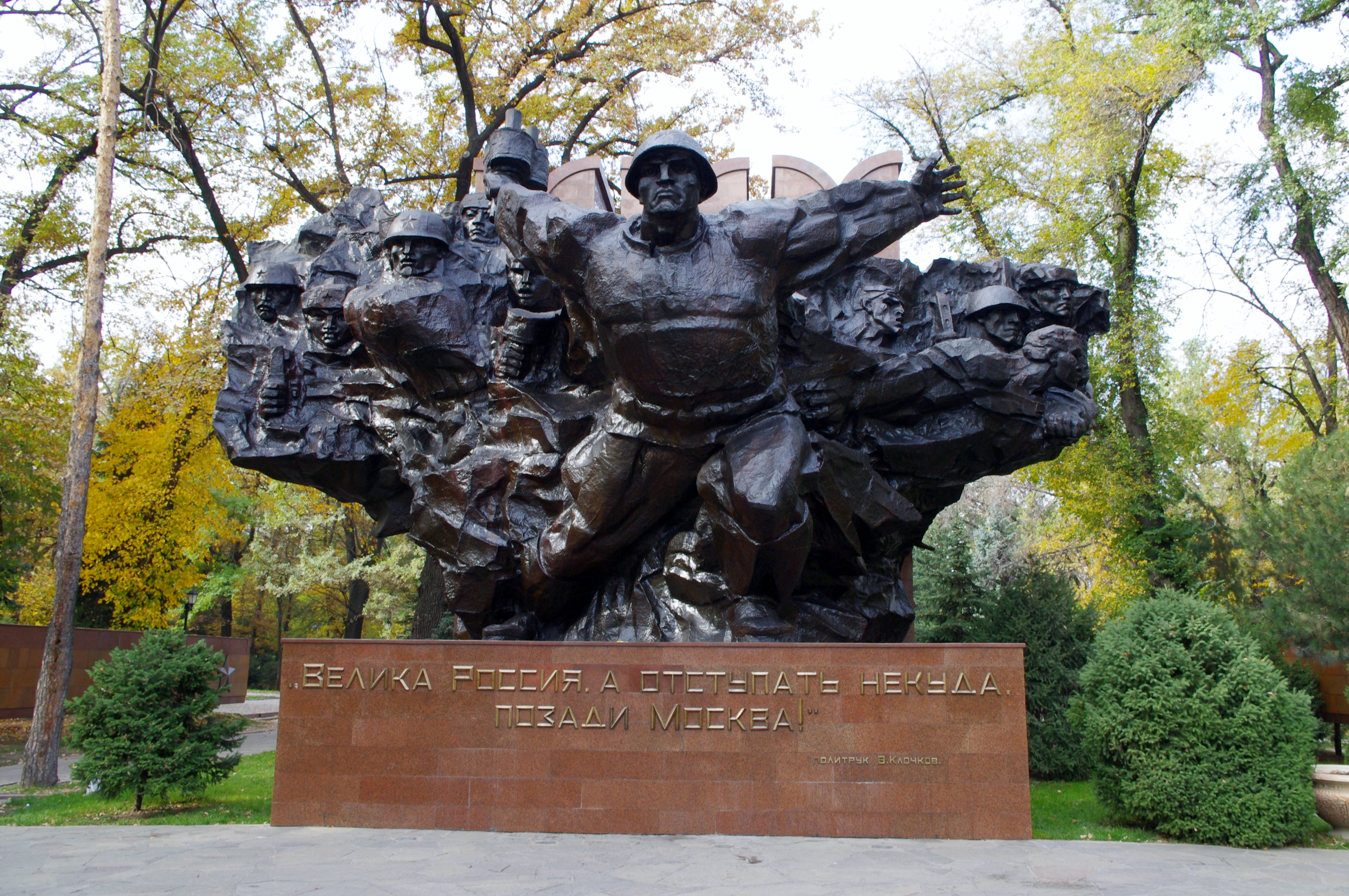
Alto relievo "The feat"

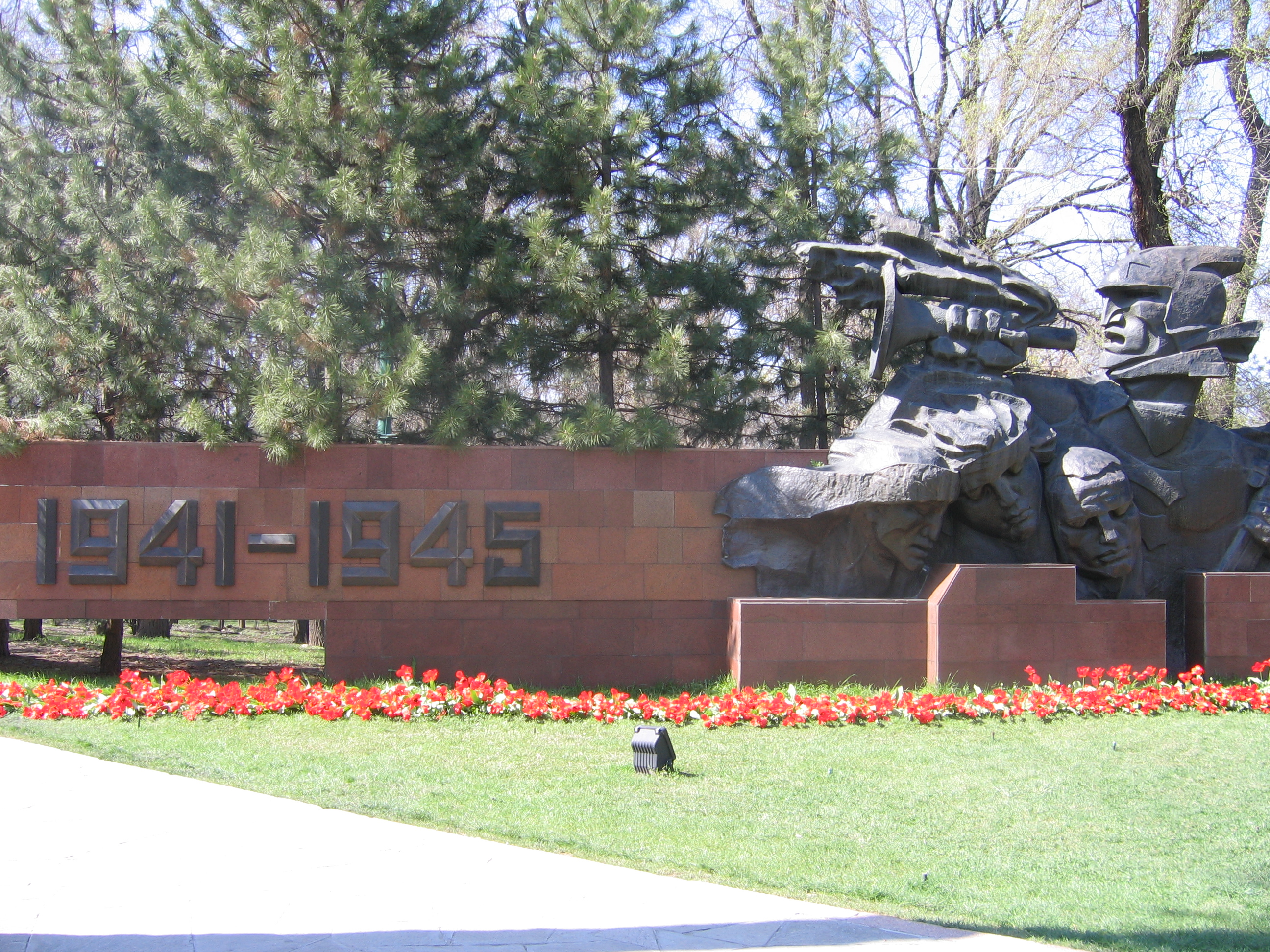
Alto relievo "Trumpeting Glory"

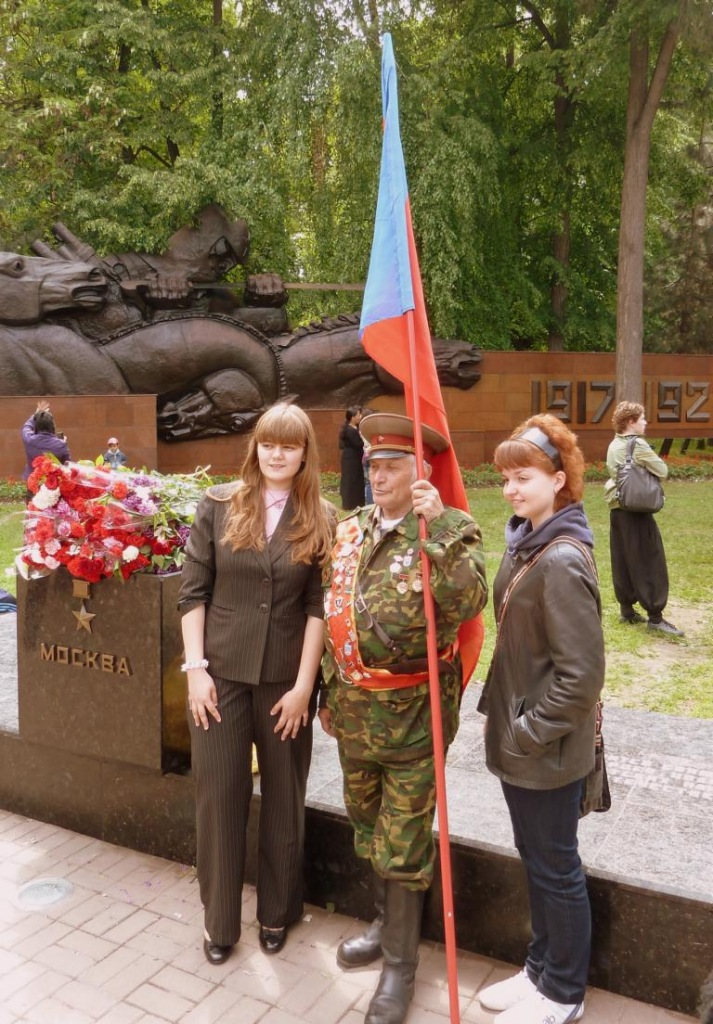
The capsule with the soil of the heroic city

== Eternal Flame ==
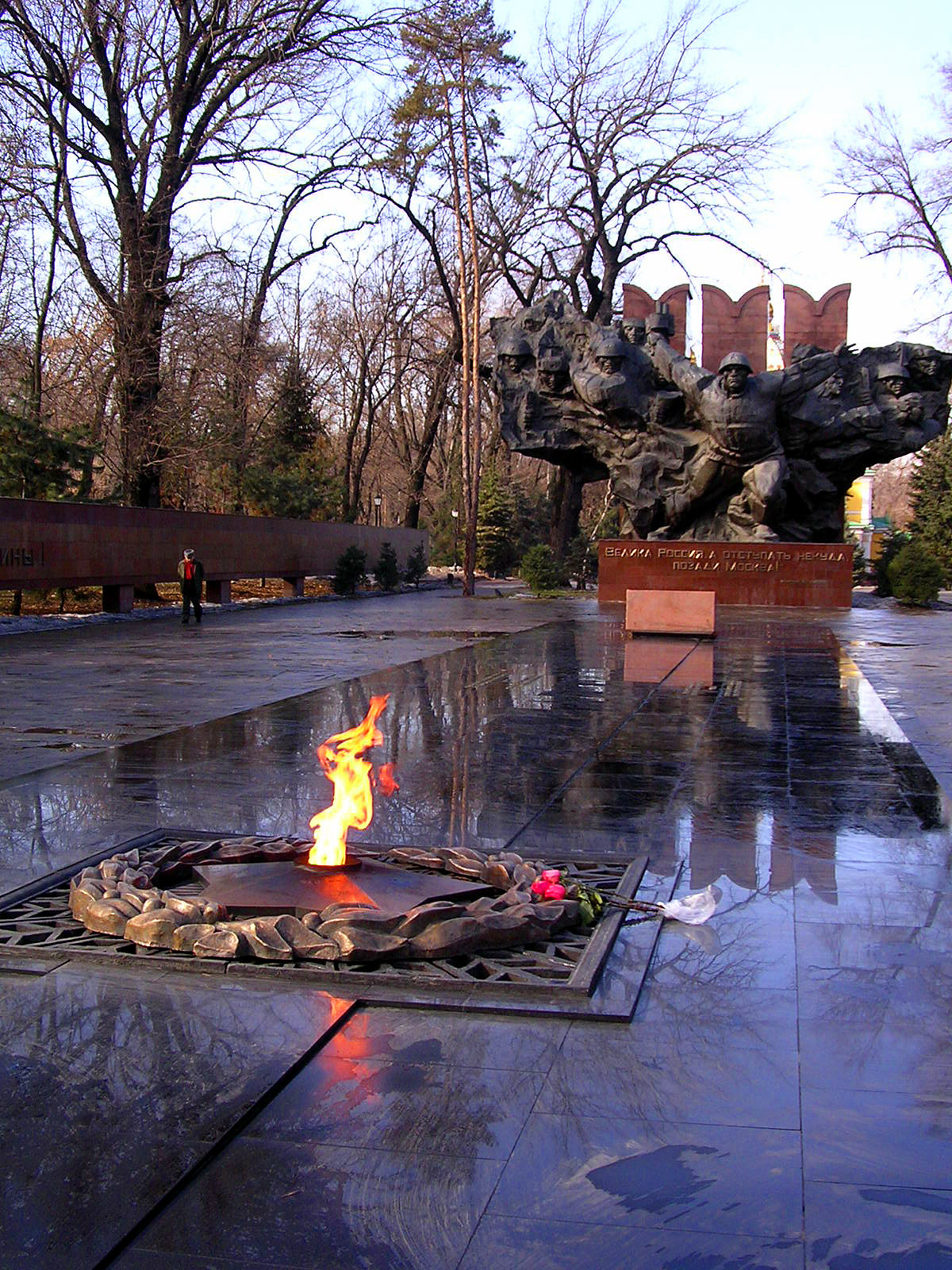
Eternal Flame

The Eternal Flame was lit in 1975 at the same time as the opening of the memorial complex. Since 1980, on the days of the Great Victory, an honor guard of the best pioneers and Komsomol members of the city have been posted at the Eternal Flame. The tradition was restored in the 2010s on the initiative of the management of Kazakhstan-Russian grammar school № 54 named after I.V. Panfilov, pupils of grades 9-11 of schools of the city take part in the Watch of Memory. Visiting the eternal flame is a tradition for the city's youth, but their behavior occasionally causes protests.

== Burials near memorial ==
On the way to the memorial there is a granite slab in memory of the discoverers of the air routes of Kazakhstan. Pilot T. Suonio, flight mechanic N. Zorin crashed in 1931 in the sky near Ayaguz, accompanying on board the only passenger - the chief of construction of the steppe Gulag D.I. Litvin.

== Monument status ==
In April 4, 1979, the executive committee of the Alma-Ata City Council of People's Deputies adopted Decision No. 139 "On Approval of the List of Historical and Cultural Monuments of Alma-Ata", which specified the Memorial of Glory. The decision provided for the issuance of a protection bond and the development of restoration projects for the monuments.
