= Central House of Officers of the Armed Forces of Ukraine =

Cultural center in Kyiv, Ukraine

- Центральний будинок офіцерів Збройних сил України
- Interactive map of the Central House of Officers of the Armed Forces of Ukraine area
- Former names: House of Red Army

General information
- Status: Cultural heritage site
- Architectural style: NeoEmpire
- Location: Hrushevsky Street, Kyiv, Ukraine
- Coordinates: 50°26′41″N 30°32′25″E
- Groundbreaking: 1931
- Inaugurated: 1933
- Owner: Ministry of Defense of Ukraine

Design and construction
- Architect: Joseph Karakis

Immovable Monument of Local Significance of Ukraine
- Official name: Будинок військової школи (Military school building)
- Type: Architecture, Urban Planning
- Reference no.: 394-Кв

Central House of Officers of the Armed Forces of Ukraine (Ukrainian: Центральний будинок офіцерів Збройних сил України, romanized: Tsentralnyi budynok ofitseriv Zbroinykh syl Ukrainy) is a cultural center located in Kyiv, Ukraine. Since its recent reorganization, Central Officers House has become one of the leading cultural centers in the Ukrainian capital city.

== History ==
The building was initially built between 1914 and 1915 as a military flight school. It was later repeatedly reconstructed up until 1931. It was renamed to the House of the Red Army and Navy in 1933. In the early post-war years, when the whole city of Kyiv was in ruins, and there were practically no audience halls. Many of the original concert halls were rebuilt during the Khrushchev and Brezhnev eras, while new halls were also created. Since Ukrainian independence was achieved in 1991, the house of officers was, for the most part, converted into a museum.

=== National Military History Museum ===
Since October 1995, the Central Museum of the Armed Forces has operated in the building. Prior to this, the museum formerly served as the Historical Museum of Kyiv Military District. More than 100 years ago, on 28 December 1910, the Kyiv Military History Museum was opened in a rebuilt basement of what is now the National Art Museum of Ukraine. That served as the precedent for the military museum. In September 1996, the Ministry of Defense of Ukraine gave the museum the status of the seniormost museum in the Ukrainian military museum system. For the first time, the museum opened its doors to visitors on 14 June 1998. On 15 January 2010, it was renamed to the National Military History Museum of Ukraine (Ukrainian: Національний військово-історичний музей України).

== Building description ==
The building was built in a NeoEmpire style; the facade is decorated under the classics. It has more than 150 rooms, as well as a large concert hall with a maximum capacity of 1,000 people. It also has the following rooms:

- National Military History Museum
- Library of the Cultural, educational and welfare center of Armed Forces of Ukraine
- Society of Officers of Ukraine
- Lecture Hall
- Restaurant

== Naming history ==
- Military Flight School (1914–1934)
- All-Ukrainian House of the Red Army (1934–1938)
- Kyiv District Orphan Building of the Red Army (1938–1948)
- Kyiv District Officers' House (1948–1994)
- Center for Culture, Education and Leisure of the Armed Forces of Ukraine (1994–1999)
- Central House of Officers of the Armed Forces of Ukraine (1999–present)

== Photos ==
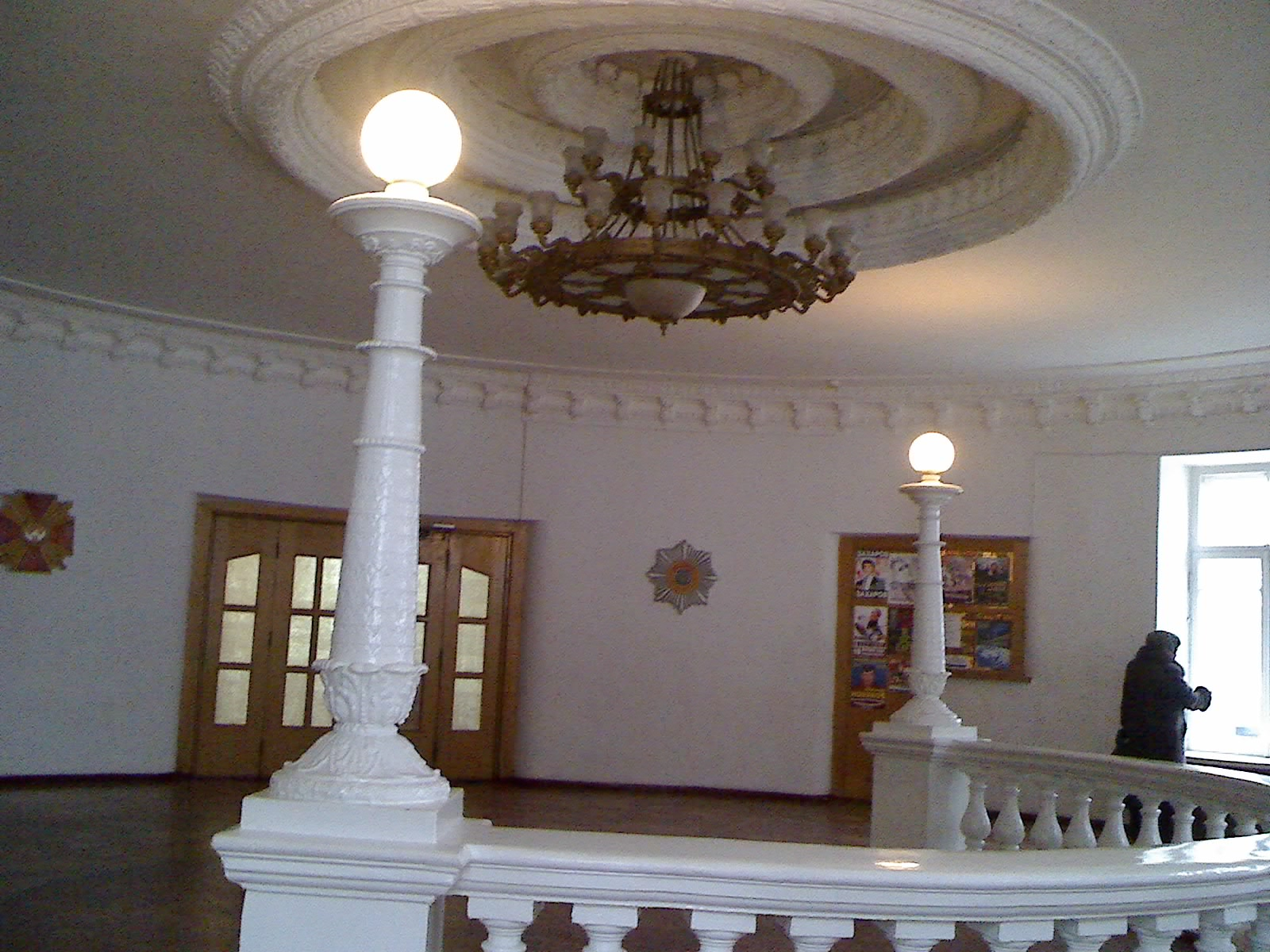
The interior of the building

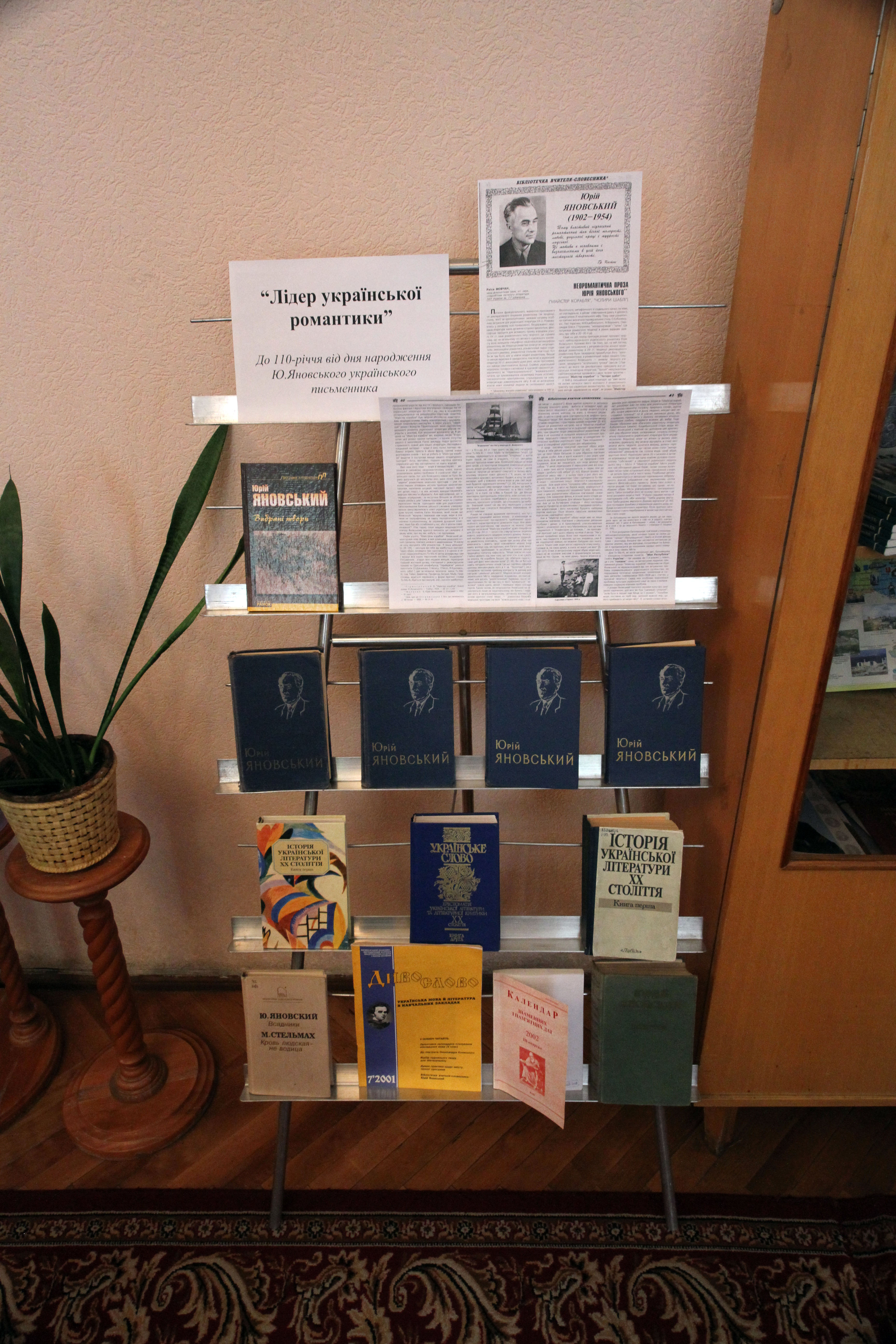
A historical collection in the building

== See also ==
- House of Military Officers
- Central Armed Forces Museum
