= Ascension Cathedral, Almaty =

Coordinates: 43°15′32″N 76°57′11″E

Ascension Cathedral
- Вознесенский собор
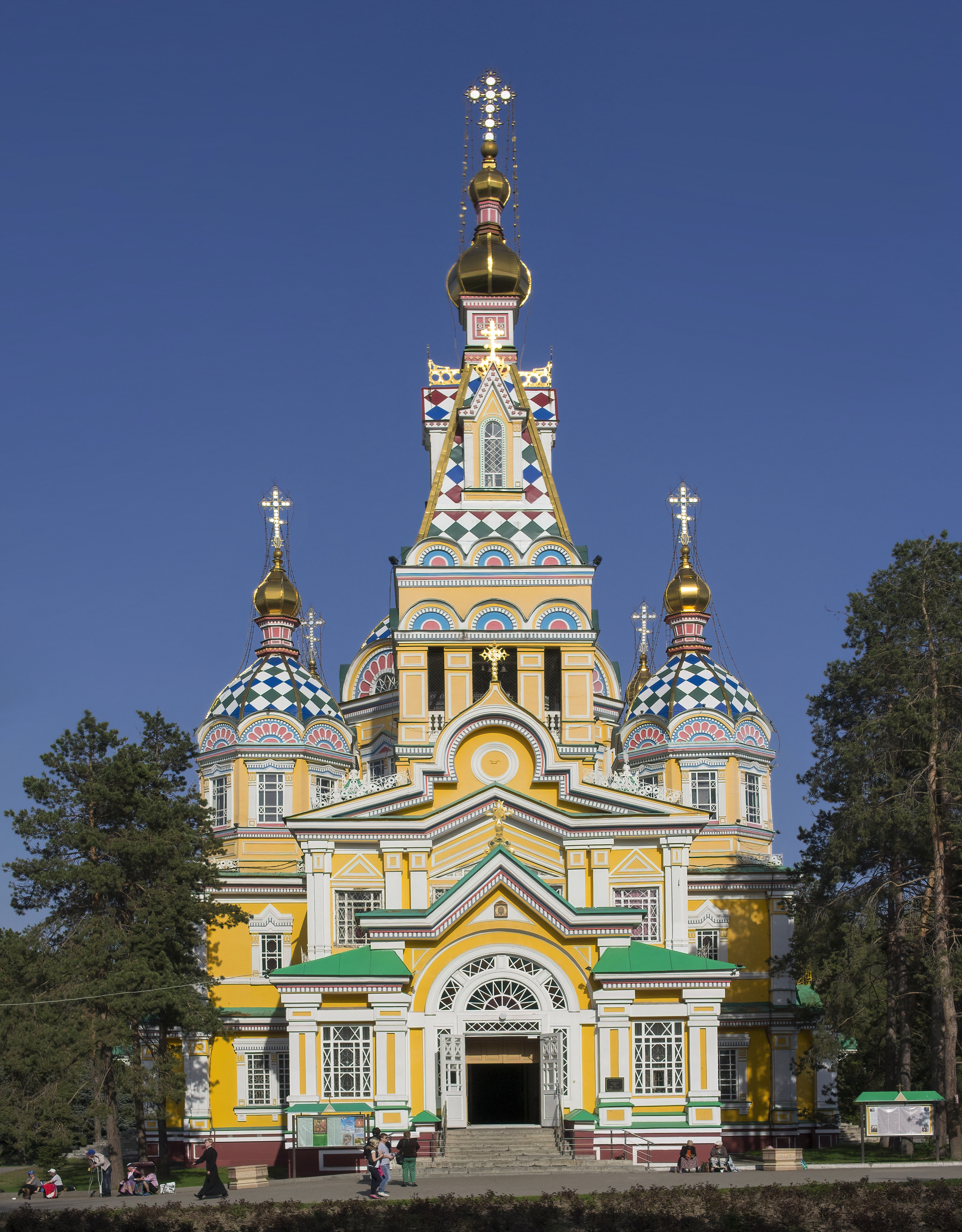
- Ascension Cathedral
- Location: Almaty
- Country: Kazakhstan
- Denomination: Russian Orthodox

History
- Consecrated: 1907

Architecture
- Style: Eclecticism

The Ascension Cathedral (Russian: Вознесенский собор Vosnesenskiy sobor, Kazakh: Вознесенск кафедралы шіркеуі Voznesensk kafedraly shirkeýi), also known as Zenkov Cathedral, is a Russian Orthodox cathedral located in Panfilov Park in Almaty, Kazakhstan. Completed in 1907, the cathedral is made out of wood but without nails. It stands 56 meters tall, and is claimed to be the second tallest wooden church in the world.

== History ==
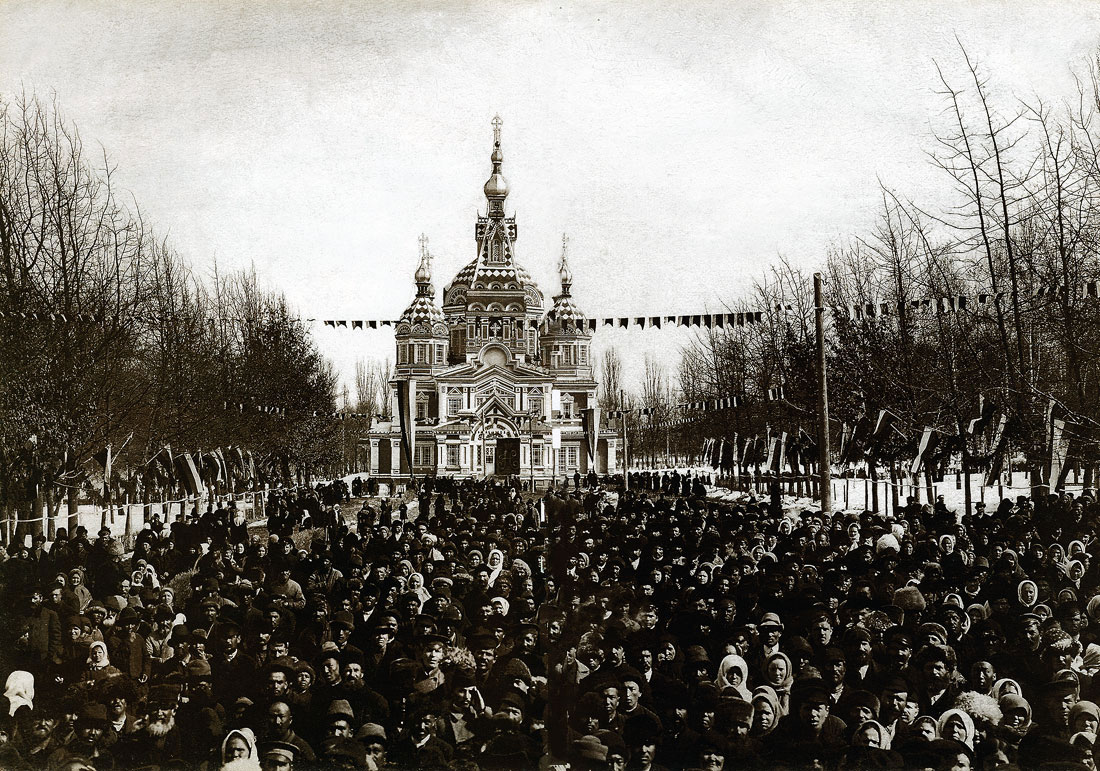
Opening ceremony of the cathedral 1907

In the late 19th century the first bishops of the Turkistan eparchy discussed the need for a Russian Orthodox Church in Almaty. On September 26, 1903, the bishop of Turkestan and Tashkent, Paisii (Vinogradov) consecrated the foundation of the church. Construction took place between 1904 and 1907.

The belfry was erected on September 14, 1906. The cathedral survived the 1911 earthquake with minimal damage, even though it was built without any nails, which some bishops attributed to divine intervention. Some speculate the decision to refrain from using nails was due to their contribution to the crucifixion of Jesus.

The inner structure of the cathedral was made in art workshops in Moscow and Kiev. The iconostasis was painted by N. Khludov. After the Russian Revolution the cathedral was used to house the Central State Museum of the Kazakh Soviet Socialist Republic. From 1930 to 1940 it was used by notable public organizations. The first radio transmitters in Almaty were situated in the cathedral's belfry.

Restoration work on the cathedral began in 1973 and lasted until 1976. In May 1995 control of the cathedral was returned to the Russian Orthodox Church. In 1997, after additional restoration work, it was reopened for religious services.

From July 2017, the cathedral underwent large-scale reconstruction, which ended on October 28, 2020. The cathedral is currently open to the public, and welcomes newcomers and guests.

== "Cathedral" coinage ==
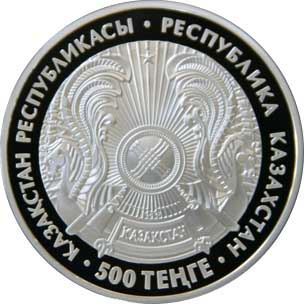

On June 2, 2007, the National Bank of Kazakhstan put into circulation the coin "Cathedral Cathedral" (proof quality) of 500 tenge in 925 sterling silver with the mintage of 4000 pieces with the aim to promote the understanding of the culture of Kazakhstan, and to favor the idea of religion as a peaceful teaching about spiritual and moral self-improvement of person. The coin bears the coat of arms of Kazakhstan as well as inscriptions divided by dots on its circumference saying "500 ТЕҢГЕ", "ҚАЗАҚСТАН РЕСПУБЛИКАСЫ" in Kazakh and "РЕСПУБЛИКА КАЗАХСТАН" in Russian are depicted on the obverse. Reverse: in the center - image of Voznesensky Cathedral of Alma-Ata city, in the upper part - circumferential inscriptions "КАФЕДРАЛЫҚ ШІРКЕУ" and "КАФЕДРАЛЬНЫЙ СОБОР" and trademark of Kazakhstan Mint, on the left side - inscription "ALMATY 2007", on the bottom - inscription "Ag 925 31.1g".

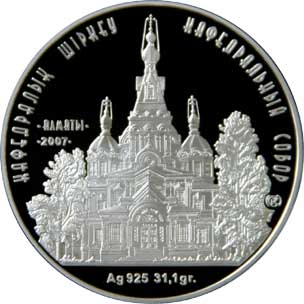
