= House of Officers (Almaty) =

Building in Almaty, Kazakhstan

- Дом офицеров Офицерлер үйі
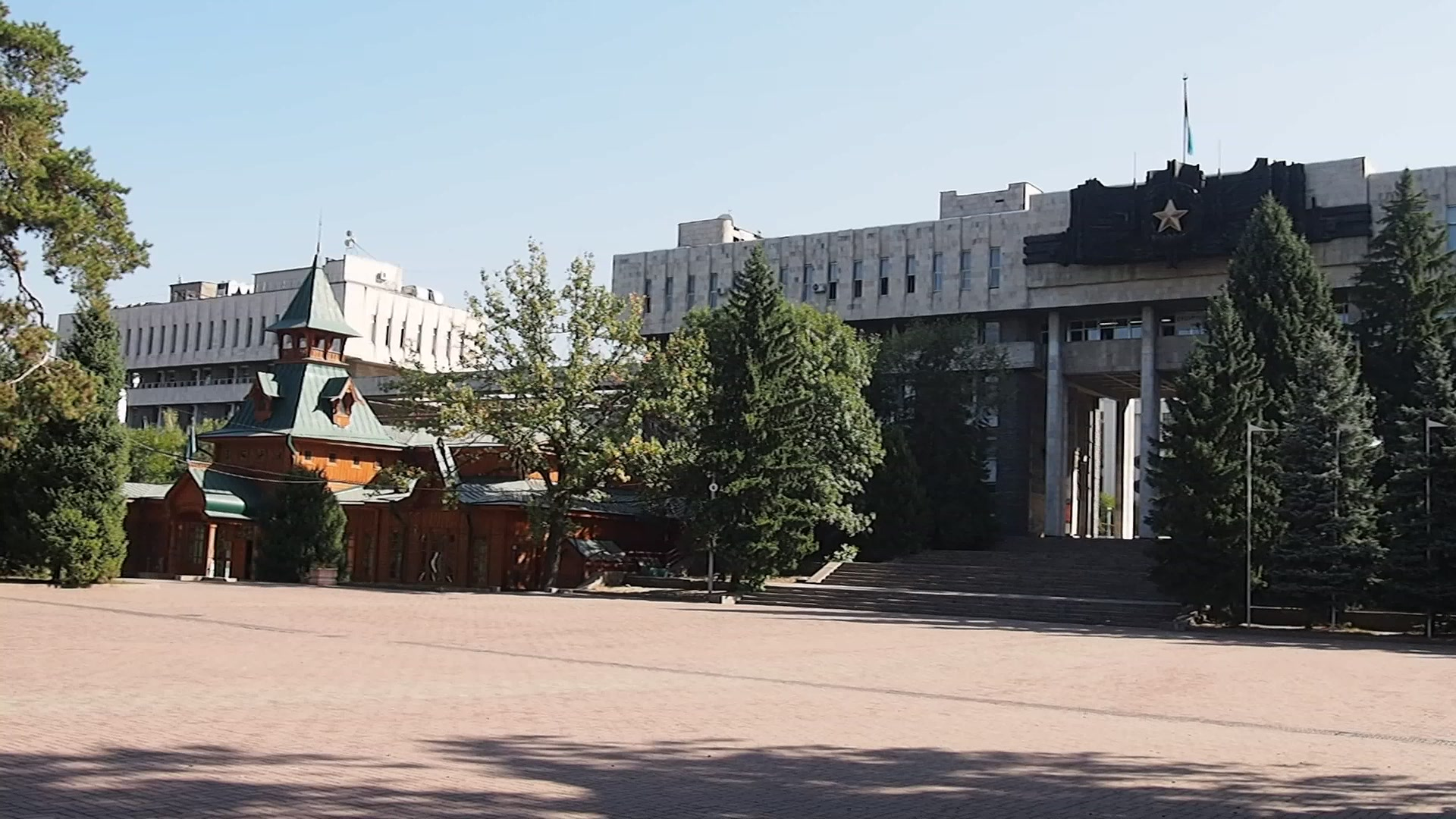
- House of Officers
- Interactive map of the House of Officers area

General information
- Location: Almaty, Kazakhstan
- Coordinates: 43°15′33″N 76°57′26″E
- Completed: 1978

Design and construction
- Architects: Yuri Ratushny; Oleg Balykbaev; Tokhtar Yeraliev

The House of Officers (Kazakh: Офицерлер үйі, romanized: Ofitserler üiı) is a military/cultural building in Almaty, Kazakhstan. It serves troops and other personnel of the Almaty Military Garrison. Currently, the building houses the Museum of the Great Patriotic War, as well as other small organizations. From 1995–2012, the building housed the Central Military Band of the Ministry of Defense of Kazakhstan. Since November 1993, the building has been part the Almaty State Historical-Architectural and Memorial Reserve.

== Building ==
The building was erected in 1978 in front of the eastern entrance to Park of 28 Panfilov Guardsmen. The main 4-story building is made in a monolithic reinforced concrete frame with brick filled walls. The facade of the building leads to the Eternal Flame of the Glory Memorial, which is decorated with chased copper and white marble colonnade.

The building includes the following halls:

- Concert hall
- Lecture hall
- Cinema
- Restaurant
- Dance hall
- Rehearsal halls
- Art studio
- Administrative rooms
