= The National Sports Federation of Ukraine "Combat Self Defense ICO" =

Ukrainian martial arts federation

Combat Self Defense ICO
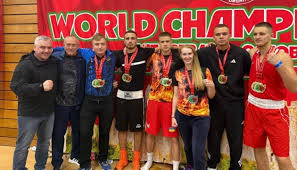
- Formation: 26 November 2015
- Founder: Oleksandr Slipchenko, Mykola Zentsev
- Type: sport
- Purpose: development of martial arts, self-defense, sports tournaments
- Headquarters: Ukraine
- President: Oleksandr Slipchenko

The National Sports Federation of Ukraine "Combat Self Defense ICO" (Ukrainian: Комбат самозахист ІСО; CSD ICO). The federation unites more than 30 varieties of combat disciplines. Competitions are held in the format of a spartakiad. During competitions, individual bouts and team fights take place in octagons, rings, and on tatami. There are divisions based on contact intensity during competitions: light contact, semi-contact, and full contact. The National Sports Federation of Ukraine "Combat Self Defense ICO" was established as a sport in Ukraine in 2015. The founders of this sport in Ukraine are Honored Coach of Ukraine Oleksandr Slipchenko and Mykola Zentsev.

"Combat Self Defense ICO" develops under the auspices of the International Combat Organisation (ICO), founded in 2009 in Great Britain.

In 2017, the Ministry of Youth and Sports of Ukraine recognized this sport as a non-Olympic sport.

In 2020, the public organization "All-Ukrainian Martial Arts Association. Combat Self Defense ICO" — the sport "Combat Self Defense ICO" — received the status of a national sports federation.

From 2015 to 2023, the president of the federation was Major General (Reserve) Mykola Zentsev, with Oleksandr Slipchenko serving as first vice-president.

Since 2023, the president of the federation has been Honored Coach of Ukraine and Honored Worker of Physical Culture and Sports of Ukraine Oleksandr Slipchenko (since 2023, Mykola Zentsev has held the title of honorary president).

== History ==
"Combat Self Defense ICO" as an organized system of martial arts emerged in 2009 in Great Britain on the initiative of the well-known sports figure and martial-arts fighter Andrew Hennessy, who serves as the worldwide president of the International Combat Organisation (ICO).

In Ukraine, this sport began to actively develop from 2015 on the initiative of Oleksandr Slipchenko and Mykola Zentsev.

In 2017, the Ministry of Youth and Sports of Ukraine officially recognized Combat Self Defense ICO as a separate non-Olympic sport.

In 2020, the public organization "All-Ukrainian Martial Arts Association. Combat Self Defense ICO" — the sport "Combat Self Defense ICO" — received the status of a national sports federation.

== Characteristics of the sport ==
"Combat Self Defense ICO" combines striking and grappling martial-arts techniques with applied elements of self-defense. The system's main goal is to develop skills for effective action under conditions of heightened risk and stress, using simple and functionally efficient movements.

=== Competition divisions ===
Athletes compete in three main divisions based on contact intensity:

- Light contact — a competition format with controlled striking power, where the emphasis is on technique and safety, similar to light contact in other contact sports.
- Semi-contact — an intermediate level between light and full contact, allowing more intensive work with controlled power and technique.
- Full contact — a competition format in which strikes may be delivered with maximum power, including possible knockouts.

Competitions are also held in adaptive categories, including among athletes with relevant disabilities.

=== Disciplines ===
"Combat Self Defense ICO" includes more than 30 varieties of combat disciplines, including:

- Boxing
- Muay Thai
- Kickboxing
- K-1
- Mixed martial arts
- Wrestling
- other striking and combined disciplines

=== Applied orientation ===
In addition to its sporting component, "Combat Self Defense ICO" has an applied character. The system's technical foundation is oriented toward action in open spaces, enclosed premises, and during service duties, including group fights: 2 fighters against 2, and 4 fighters against 4.

In addition, the training process includes psychological preparation for action in stressful situations, countering an armed opponent, defense against multiple attackers, and the use of special equipment within the limits of current legislation.

=== Distinguishing features compared to other martial arts ===
The main distinguishing feature of "Combat Self Defense ICO" as a sport is that competitions are held in the form of a martial-arts spartakiad, where each discipline (direction) has a separate division, and athletes' performances follow the corresponding rules, preserving the diversity of disciplines.

== Rules and regulations ==
The official competition rules for Combat Self Defense ICO are approved by the Ministry of Youth and Sports of Ukraine. Training programs for children's and youth sports schools have been incorporated into the system of sports training.

== International competitions. Achievements of the Ukrainian national team ==
Ukraine's national team in "Combat Self Defense ICO" regularly places among the medalists at ICO international competitions.

- 2016 — European Championship, Rome (Italy) — 1st place
- 2017 — World Championship, Birmingham (Great Britain) — 3rd place
- 2018 — World Championship, Rome (Italy) — 2nd place
- 2019 — World Championship, Motherwell (Scotland) — 3rd place
- 2021 — European Championship, Zalaegerszeg (Hungary) — 1st place
- 2022 — World Championship, Nagykanizsa (Hungary) — 2nd place
- 2023 — European Championship, Nagykanizsa (Hungary) — 1st place
- 2023 — World Championship, Hull (Great Britain) — 3rd place
- 2024 — European Championship, Catania (Italy) — 1st place
- 2024 — World Championship, Frankfurt am Main (Germany) — 2nd place
- 2025 — World Championship, Swansea (Great Britain) — 5th place
- 2026 — European Championship, Lübeck (Germany) — 1st place
- 2026 – World Championship, Thonon-les-Bains (France) – 3rd place

== National competitions ==
The "Combat Self Defense ICO" federation regularly holds domestic Ukrainian competitions and national championships in combat sports. Based on the results of these tournaments, finalists — candidates for Ukraine's national team who represent the country at world and European championships — are selected. One such event was the Ukrainian Combat Sports Championship, held on 1–3 May 2026 in the city of Brovary (Kyiv Oblast). Within the championship, athletes competed in the following divisions: free boxing, K-1 combat, Thai boxing combat, mixed combat, wrestling, low combat, light combat, safe combat, and demonstration forms. The competitions involved 956 athletes from 22 oblasts of Ukraine and the city of Kyiv. In total, 1,027 bouts were held across four rings, an octagon, and three tatami mats. Final results of the team standings:

- 1st place — Kyiv Oblast (87 gold, 107 silver, 124 bronze medals)
- 2nd place — city of Kyiv (57 gold, 50 silver, 69 bronze medals)
- 3rd place — Zakarpattia Oblast (34 gold, 21 silver, 13 bronze medals)

The championship became the first stage of selection for Ukraine's national team ahead of the ICO World Championship, scheduled for 15–18 October 2026 in France.

== Structure and activity of the National Sports Federation of Ukraine — Combat Self Defense ICO ==
=== Leadership and management ===
The development of the National Sports Federation of Ukraine "Combat Self Defense ICO" is coordinated by the All-Ukrainian Martial Arts Association "Combat Self Defense ICO", which has the following management structure:

- President — Oleksandr Slipchenko since 2021, Honored Coach of Ukraine;
- Honorary President — Mykola Zentsev since 2024, president in 2015–2024, Major General (Reserve);
- Head coach of the Ukrainian national team — Serhii Kozenko, Honored Coach of Ukraine.

Regional offices and leadership:

Kyiv, Kyiv Oblast, Zakarpattia Oblast, Ternopil Oblast, city of Zaporizhzhia, Zaporizhzhia Oblast, Sumy Oblast, city of Odesa, Odesa Oblast, city of Dnipro, Dnipropetrovsk Oblast, Poltava Oblast, Lviv Oblast.

== Gallery ==
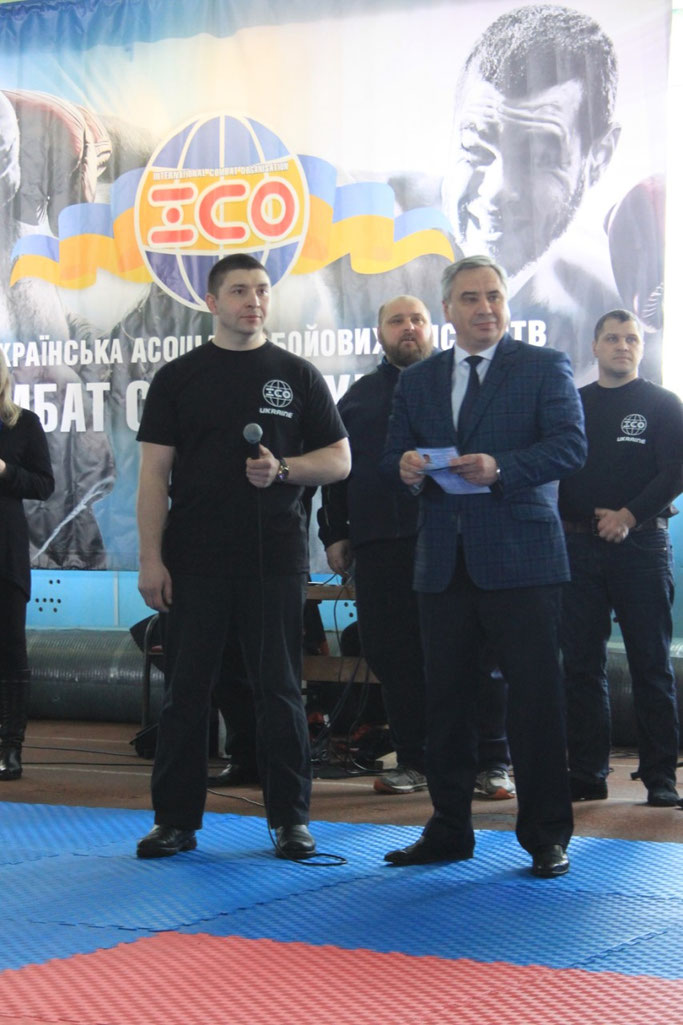
Presentation of Master of Sports of Ukraine certificates at the Ukrainian "Combat Self Defense ICO" Championship, Brovary, 2018

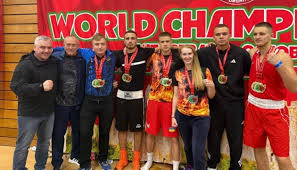
Combat sports World Championship, Swansea, Wales, United Kingdom, 2025

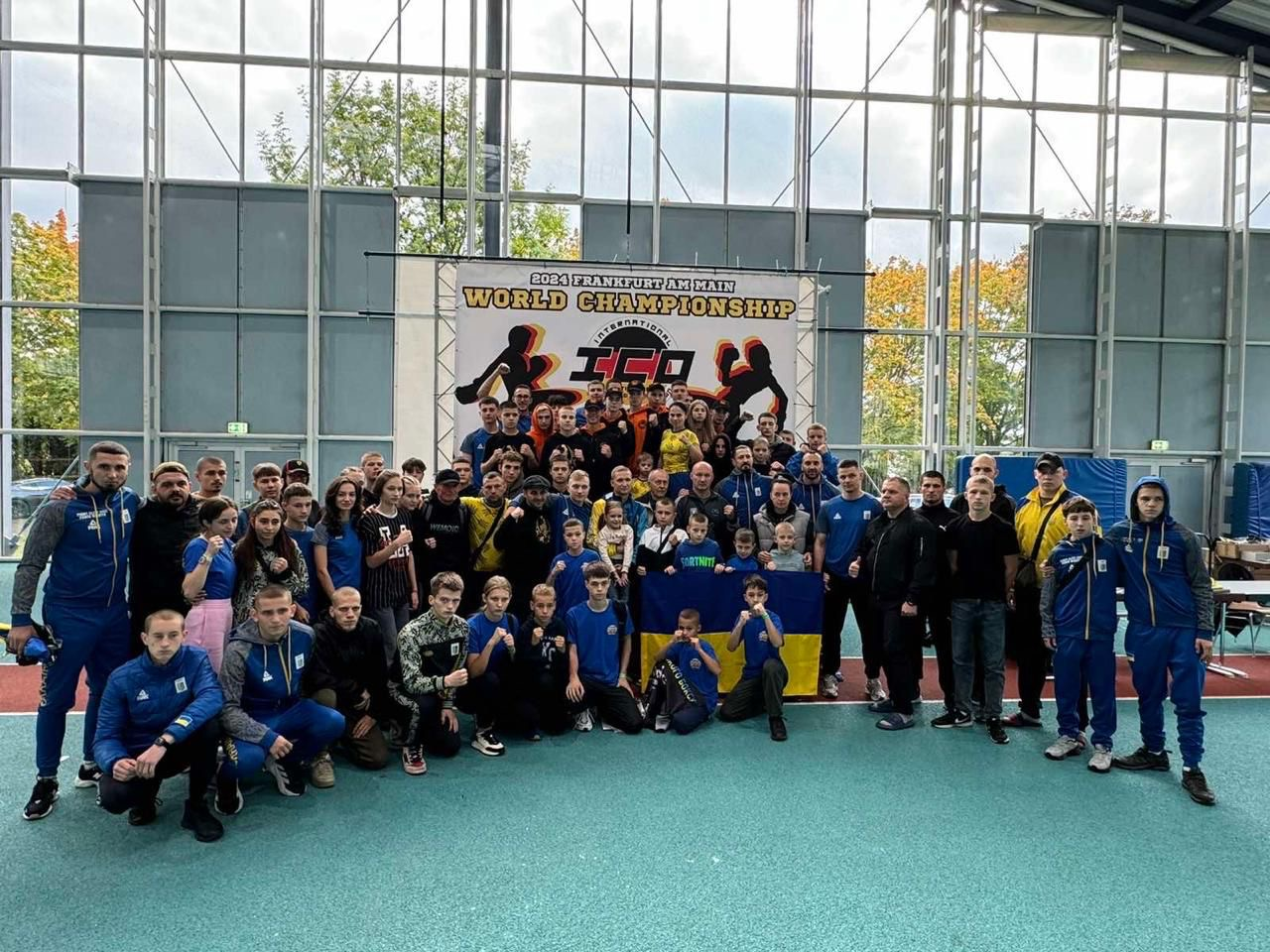
Tournament of the All-Ukrainian Martial Arts Association "Combat Self Defense ICO"

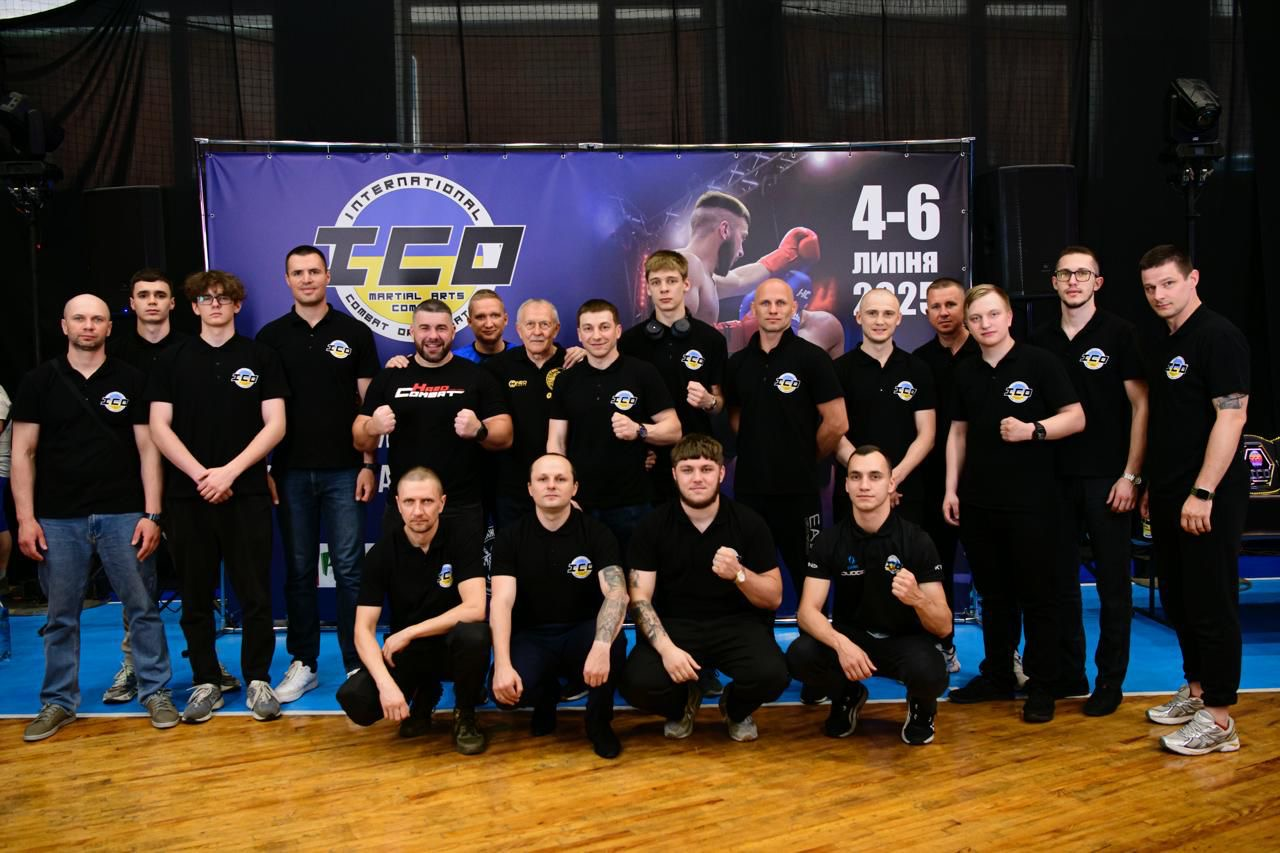
During "Combat Self Defense ICO" competitions in Ukraine

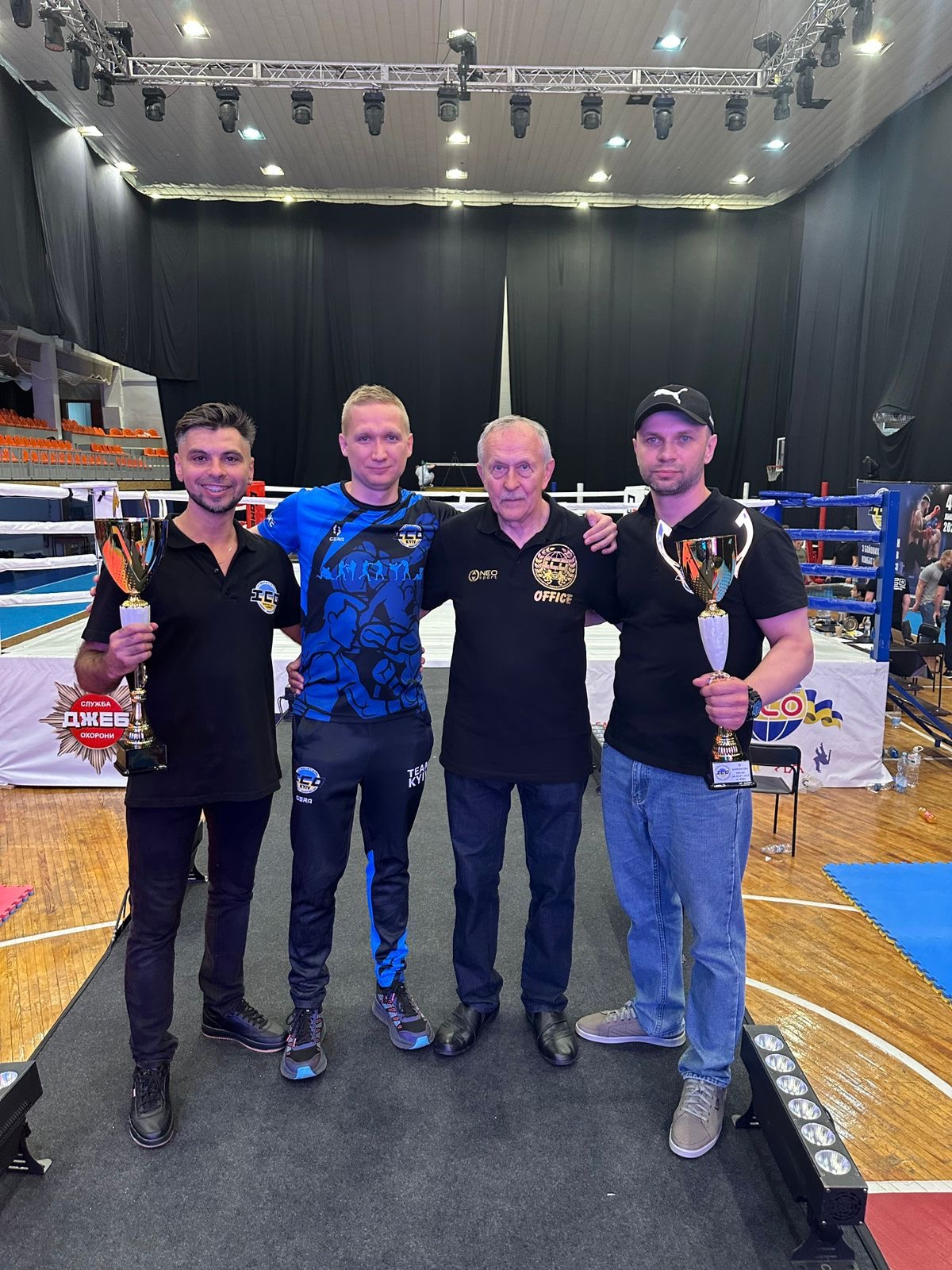
Honored coach of the federation Oleksandr Slipchenko with athletes at the 2024 World Championship

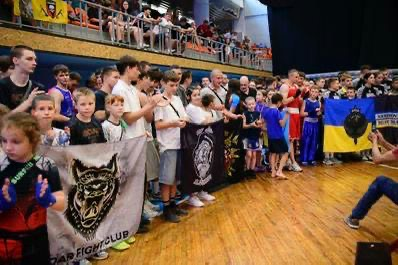
Tournament of the All-Ukrainian Martial Arts Association "Combat Self Defense ICO"

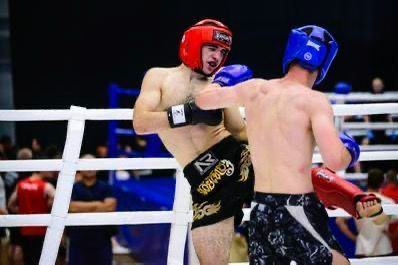
A bout between "Combat Self Defense ICO" athletes

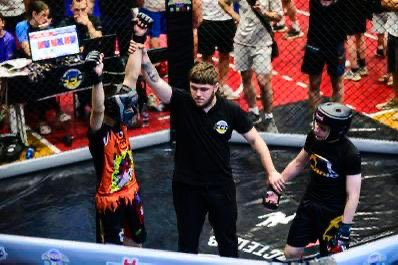
During a bout between "Combat Self Defense ICO" athletes

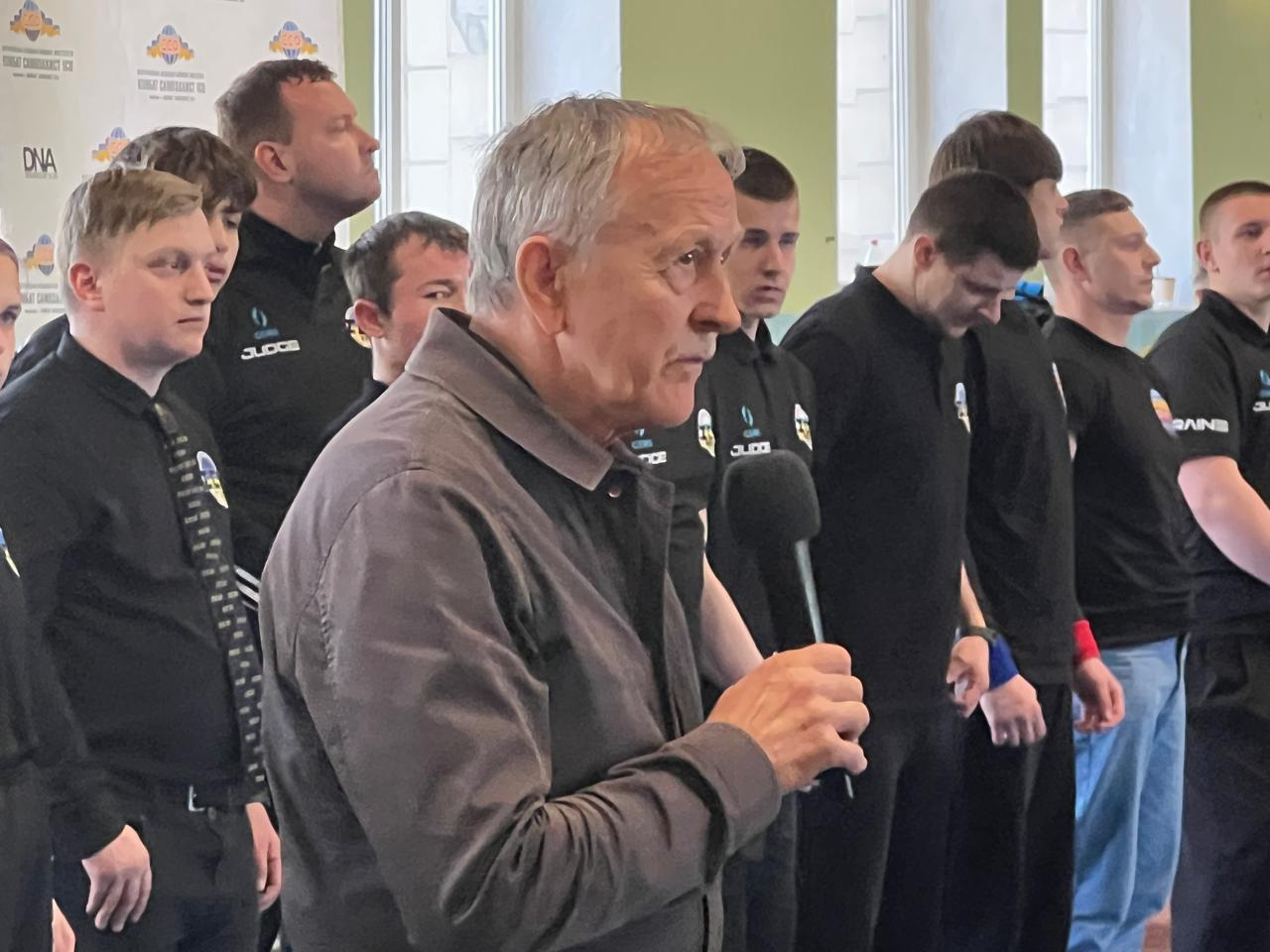
Honored Coach and Honored Worker of Physical Culture and Sports of Ukraine Oleksandr Slipchenko

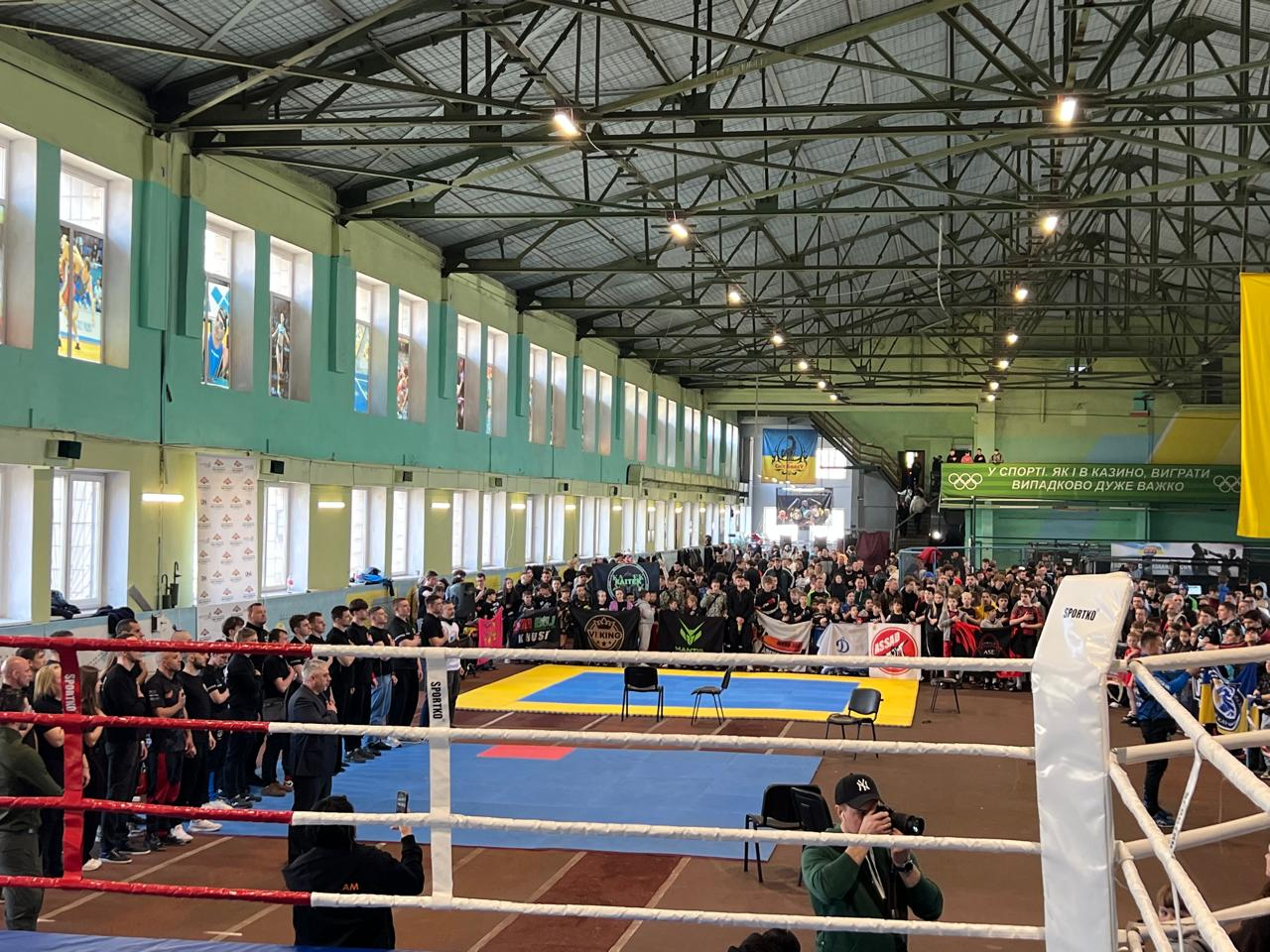
Opening of the "Combat Self Defense ICO" combat sports championship, 1–3 May 2026, which brought together nearly a thousand athletes and coaches from 22 oblasts of the country

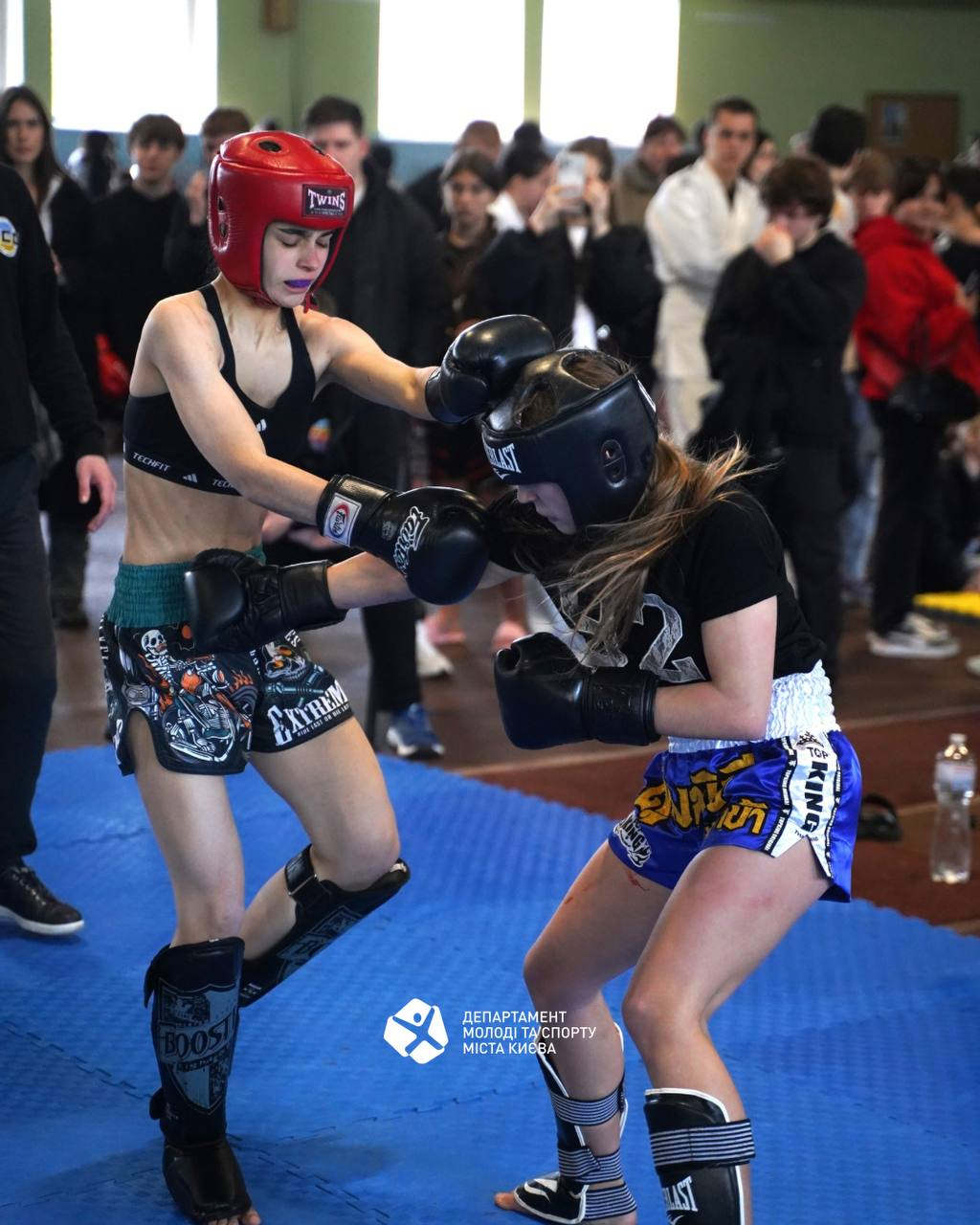
Women's bout. "Combat Self Defense ICO" combat sports championship, 1–3 May 2026

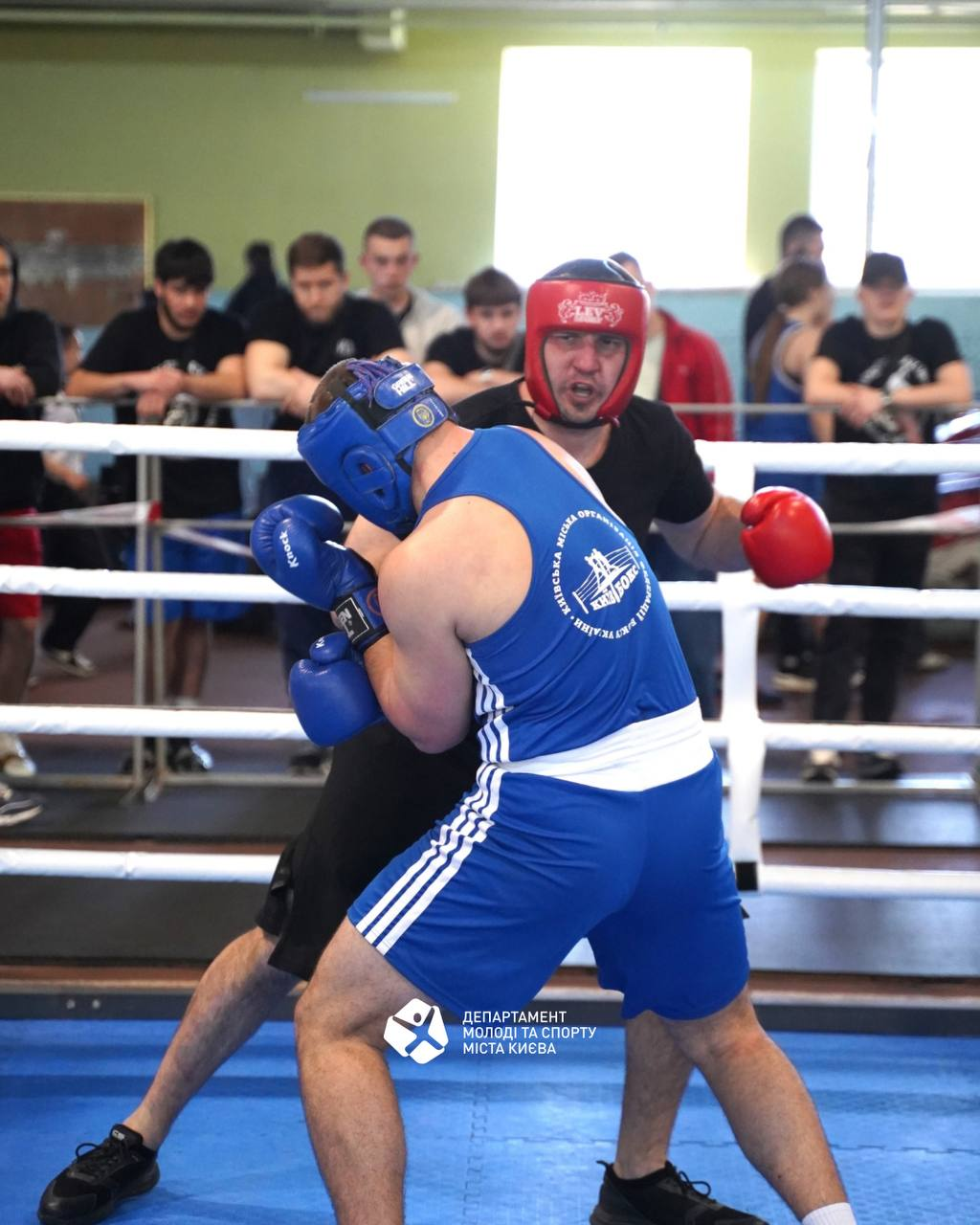
A "Combat Self Defense ICO" combat sports championship was held in Ukraine, 1–3 May 2026

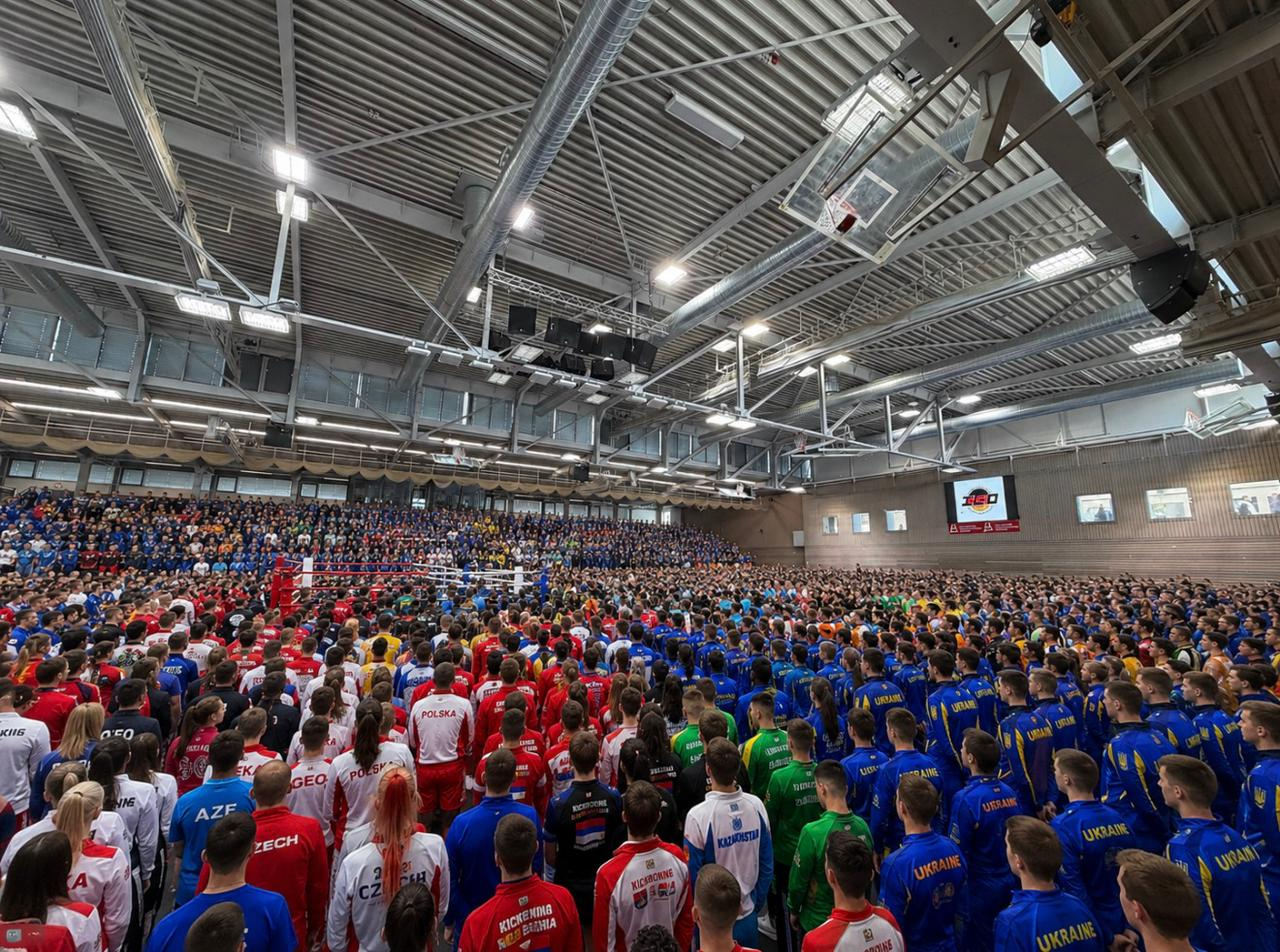
Ukraine's national team wins the 2026 European Championship in "Combat Self Defense ICO" in Germany
