= Ruslan Bogdan =

Ukrainian businessman and politician

- Руслан Богдан
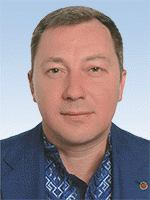
- Official portrait, 2016

People's Deputy of Ukraine
- In office 17 July 2016 – 29 August 2019
- Preceded by: Taras Kutovy
- Succeeded by: Maksym Berezin
- Constituency: Poltava Oblast, No. 151
- In office 23 November 2007 – 12 December 2012
- Constituency: Yulia Tymoshenko Bloc, No. 146

Personal details
- Born: 28 January 1972 (age 54) Kyiv, Ukrainian SSR, Soviet Union (now Ukraine)
- Party: Batkivshchyna
- Other political affiliations: Yulia Tymoshenko Bloc; Reforms and Order Party
- Education: Ivan Bohun Military High School; Taras Shevchenko National University of Kyiv; Ivano-Frankivsk National Technical University of Oil and Gas

Ruslan Dmytrovych Bogdan (Ukrainian: Руслан Дмитрович Богдан; born 28 January 1972) is a Ukrainian businessman and politician who served as a People's Deputy of Ukraine from 2007 to 2012 and from 2016 to 2019, representing the proportional-representative list of the Yulia Tymoshenko Bloc and Ukraine's 151st electoral district in northern Poltava Oblast, respectively. Prior to his election, he was a businessman at multiple companies.

== Early life and career ==
He studied at the secondary school No. 234, Kyiv. In 1989 Bogdan entered Kyiv Suvorov Military School (now Ivan Bohun Military High School), a military academy. From 1992 to 1997, he studied at the Ukrainian State University of Physical Education and Sports.

In 1994 he began working at the FURT company. Starting as the company's chief of logistics, he later became the financial director before leaving the company in 2001. After studying at Taras Shevchenko National University of Kyiv from 1996 to 2000 and graduating with a specialisation in economics, He also worked at Enerhotorh as first deputy director from 2001 to 2007. Bogdan graduated from the Ivano-Frankivsk National Technical University of Oil and Gas in 2008 with a specialisation in geology.

== Political career ==
In 2005, Bogdan joined the Reforms and Order Party. In the 2006 Ukrainian parliamentary election he was a candidate for the party in its Civil Bloc "PORA-PRP" (with PORA) as the 31st candidate on the party's proportional list. This alliance received 1.47% and no seats at the election.

=== People's Deputy of Ukraine (2007–2012) ===
In the 2007 Ukrainian parliamentary election, Bogdan was elected as a People's Deputy of Ukraine, the 146th candidate on the proportional list of the Yulia Tymoshenko Bloc. At the time of his election, he was a member of Reforms and Order Party.

Bogdan was expelled from the Yulia Tymoshenko Bloc in February 2011 for unclear reasons. Following his expelling from the bloc, he participated far less in sessions of the Verkhovna Rada (Ukrainian parliament). In July 2012, he re-joined the Yulia Tymoshenko Bloc. Bogdan was a member of the Verkhovna Rada Committee on Fuel and Energy Complex, Nuclear Policy and Nuclear Safety from December 2007. He additionally served as a member of the Verkhovna Rada Temporary Inquiry Panel on the audit of the National Bank of Ukraine during the financial crisis from 18 December 2008 to 18 December 2009 and as a member of the Verkhovna Rada Interim Commission on the decision of the Arbitration Institute of Stockholm Chamber of Commerce, investigation the facts of corruption by "RosUkrEnerho" and the involvement of public authorities and arrest of the former head of the State Customs service of Ukraine A. Makarenko from 1 July 2010 to 19 November 2010.

In the 2012 Ukrainian parliamentary election, he was the 73rd candidate on the proportional list of Batkivshchyna. He was not elected.

=== People's Deputy of Ukraine (2016–2019) ===
During the 17 July 2016 mid-term elections Bogdan was re-elected from Batkivshchyna in Ukraine's 151st electoral district.

In the 2019 Ukrainian parliamentary election Bogdan was an unsuccessful candidate in the 151st electoral district. He lost the election, gathering 15.58% of the vote. Maksym Berezin, of the Servant of the People party, was the victor with 47.45% of the vote.
