= Mikhail Davydov (oncologist) =

Russian medical scientist (1947–2025)

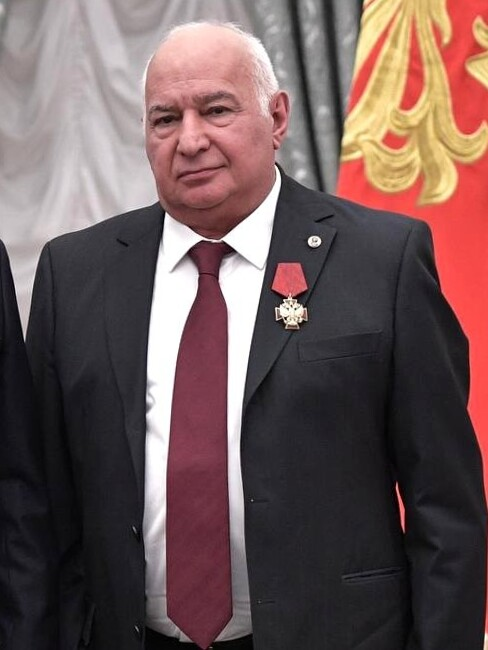
Davydov in 2019

Mikhail Ivanovich Davydov (Russian: Михаил Иванович Давыдов; 11 October 1947 – 8 February 2025) was a Russian doctor and medical scientist. He received the Russian State Prize Laureate, was an Honored Science Worker of the Russian Federation, Director of the Russian Cancer Research Center, member of the Presidium and Academician of RAS, member and President of the Russian Academy of Medical Sciences.

== Life and career ==
Davydov was born in Konotop, Sumy Oblast, in Ukrainian SSR. He graduated from the Kyiv Suvorov Military School, and then served three years in the Russian Airborne Troops. His mother wanted him to become a musician. However, after reading the Yuri German trilogy “My dear man”, Davydov decided to become a surgeon.

In 1975, Davydov graduated from the I.M. Sechenov First Moscow State Medical University (being a student he worked as a laboratory assistant at the sub-department of operative surgery). Then there were residency training (1975–1977) and postgraduate studies (1977–1980) in the Blokhin Cancer Research Center. He defended his master's and doctoral dissertations and then became a professor.

In 1986, Davydov became a leading researcher in the Thoracic department. From 1988 he was the head of the Department of abdominothoracic oncology. From 1992 he was the Director of the Blokhin Center. He was the Chief Oncologist of the Medical Center of the RF Presidential Department for Property Management. He also headed the sub-department of oncology in the Russian State Medical University.

Davydov is known in Russia and abroad as a scientist who dedicated his scientific and practical activities to developing new and improving existing methods of the surgical treatment of lung, esophageal, stomach cancer, mediastinal mass. He developed a principally new technique of intrapleural gastro-esophageal and esophageal-intestinal anastomoses which is notable for its original technical performance, absolute security and highly adjusted to physiology; the surgical measures have been developed where the results of treatment of lung, esophageal, stomach cancer are improved due to the mediastinal and retroperitoneal lymph node dissection.

Davydov died on 8 February 2025, at the age of 77.

== Achievements ==
For the first time in onco-surgery Davydov began to make operations with plasty of cava, aorta, and main pulmonary artery. He developed and successfully implemented combined esophagectomy with sleeve resection and plasty of trachea in the presence of esophageal cancer complicated by esophageal-tracheal fistula. He enriched the arsenal of broncho- and angiobronhoplastic surgery. He is among the first authors of the technique of the surgical treatment of upper thoracic aperture tumors.

Davydov created the school of oncologists-surgeons dealing with problems of detailed diagnosis and the improvement of the cancer treatment with the assistance of the most advanced achievements of the different directions both in the practical and experimental oncology. He supervised more than 30 theses. He is the author and coauthor of more than 300 scientific publications, including 3 monographs, 6 scientific and methodological films.

Davydov was a State Prize Laureate in Science and Technology (2002), a member of the Russian Academy of Sciences (2003) and the Russian Academy of Medical Sciences (2004), Doctor of Medical Sciences, a professor, Honored Science Worker of the Russian Federation. He was elected a member of the International Society of Surgeons, a member of the American and the European Society of Surgeons, and a member of the New York Academy of Sciences – among the leading surgeons of Russia and the CIS.
