= Mykola Zentsev =

Ukrainian reserve major general (born 1971)

- Education: Kyiv Suvorov Military School National Academy for Public Administration under the President of Ukraine
- Military career
- Allegiance: Ukraine
- Branch: Armed Forces of Ukraine
- Rank: Major General
- Conflicts: Bosnia and Herzegovina; Kosovo; Russo-Ukrainian War
- Awards: He has received Ukrainian state and departmental distinctions, as well as NATO distinctions associated with peacekeeping service. He is a recipient of the Ukrainian state honorary title Honored Worker of Physical Culture and Sports of Ukraine.

Mykola Mykolayovych Zentsev (Ukrainian: Микола Миколайович Зенцев; born 1971) is a Ukrainian reserve major general, former government official and international security analyst.

He served in the Armed Forces of Ukraine and later held senior positions in the Ministry of Defence of Ukraine and other Ukrainian government institutions. After leaving government service, Zentsev worked in the private security and humanitarian demining sectors. He also writes and comments on international security, geopolitics and military affairs.

In 2026, Zentsev's assessments of security developments were published or cited by foreign media and research organisations. In April 2026, The Guardian published his assessment of the discovery of explosives near the Balkan Stream gas pipeline in Serbia and its possible connection to a Russian hybrid operation.

In August 2026, the English-language edition of N1 published an article discussing Zentsev's assessment of the risks of destabilisation in Bosnia and Herzegovina. His assessment of the security significance of the Brčko District was also cited by the International Institute for Middle East and Balkan Studies (IFIMES) in a research report on the political situation in Bosnia and Herzegovina.

== Early life and education ==
Zentsev received his initial military education at the Kyiv Suvorov Military School. He later graduated from the National Defence Academy of Ukraine with a master's degree in military management and international relations, and received a further master's degree in public administration and national security from the National Academy for Public Administration under the President of Ukraine.

== Military and government career ==
Demining operations, Republika Srpska, 1998, Nevesinje

Zentsev served in the Armed Forces of Ukraine and participated in peacekeeping operations in the former Yugoslavia, including in Bosnia and Herzegovina and Kosovo. He subsequently served at the Ministry of Defence of Ukraine and attained the rank of major general.

He also held senior positions in Ukrainian government institutions, including director of a department at the State Committee of Ukraine for Veterans' Affairs, where he held the second rank of civil servant. He later served as adviser on defence matters to the Head of the Dnipropetrovsk Regional State Administration. Zentsev completed his government service in 2015 as head of a directorate at the Ministry of Defence of Ukraine.

== Business and security activities ==
After leaving government service, Zentsev worked in the security and energy sectors, serving as Deputy General Director of SOCAR Energy Ukraine.

In 2015, he founded Andromeda, a Ukrainian company operating in the fields of security and humanitarian demining, including security services, risk assessment and humanitarian mine action. The company has worked with international partners, including Japanese organisations, in the fields of demining and security.

== Public and sports activities ==
Zentsev is a co-founder of the Combat Self-Defence ICO association, established in Ukraine in 2015. The association was granted National Sports Federation status in 2020, and Zentsev later became its Honorary President.

In 2017, Zentsev and Oleksandr Slipchenko organised the "Pamyat" ("Memory") martial arts tournament dedicated to internationalist soldiers and participants of the Anti-Terrorist Operation in eastern Ukraine.

He is a member of the Presidium of the Federation of Bodyguards of Ukraine and, since 2011, has been a member of the organising committee of the World Championships among bodyguards held in Ukraine, including the 2016 Championship in Kyiv.

He is a member of the National Union of Journalists of Ukraine and the International Police Association.

== Security analysis and publications ==
Zentsev writes and comments on international security, defence policy, geopolitics and military affairs. His published analysis has addressed European security and Russian hybrid warfare, as well as security developments involving Slovakia, Belarus, and the Asia-Pacific region.

In August 2026, the English-language edition of N1 published an article discussing Zentsev's assessment of the risks of destabilisation in Bosnia and Herzegovina. N1 identified him as a Ukrainian security expert and reserve major general and reported his assessment that Bosnia and Herzegovina could become another arena for Russian efforts to destabilise Europe and divert Western attention from Ukraine.

His assessment of the security significance of the Brčko District was also cited by the International Institute for Middle East and Balkan Studies (IFIMES) in its August 2026 research report on Bosnia and Herzegovina.

Zentsev's assessments concerning the Balkans were also reported by regional media. Croatian newspaper Večernji list published an article discussing warnings by a Ukrainian military expert about a potential crisis hotspot in the Balkans.

A Bosnian television channel, FACE, also reported on Zentsev's assessment of the security situation surrounding the Brčko District.

In 2026, Zentsev's assessment of the Russian satellite system "Rassvet" was also published by Chinese-language media in Taiwan.

In April 2026, following the discovery of explosives near the Balkan Stream gas pipeline in Serbia shortly before the Hungarian parliamentary election, The Guardian sought Zentsev's assessment of the incident.

He questioned whether the quantity of explosives reported by Serbian authorities would have been sufficient to seriously damage the pipeline and assessed the circumstances as potentially consistent with a Russian hybrid operation.

His assessment of the incident was also reported by Ukrinform.

== Honours and awards ==
Zentsev holds the Ukrainian state honorary title Honoured Worker of Physical Culture and Sports of Ukraine. He has also received Ukrainian state and departmental distinctions, as well as NATO distinctions associated with peacekeeping service.
