= Maksym Berezin =

Ukrainian politician

- Максим Березін
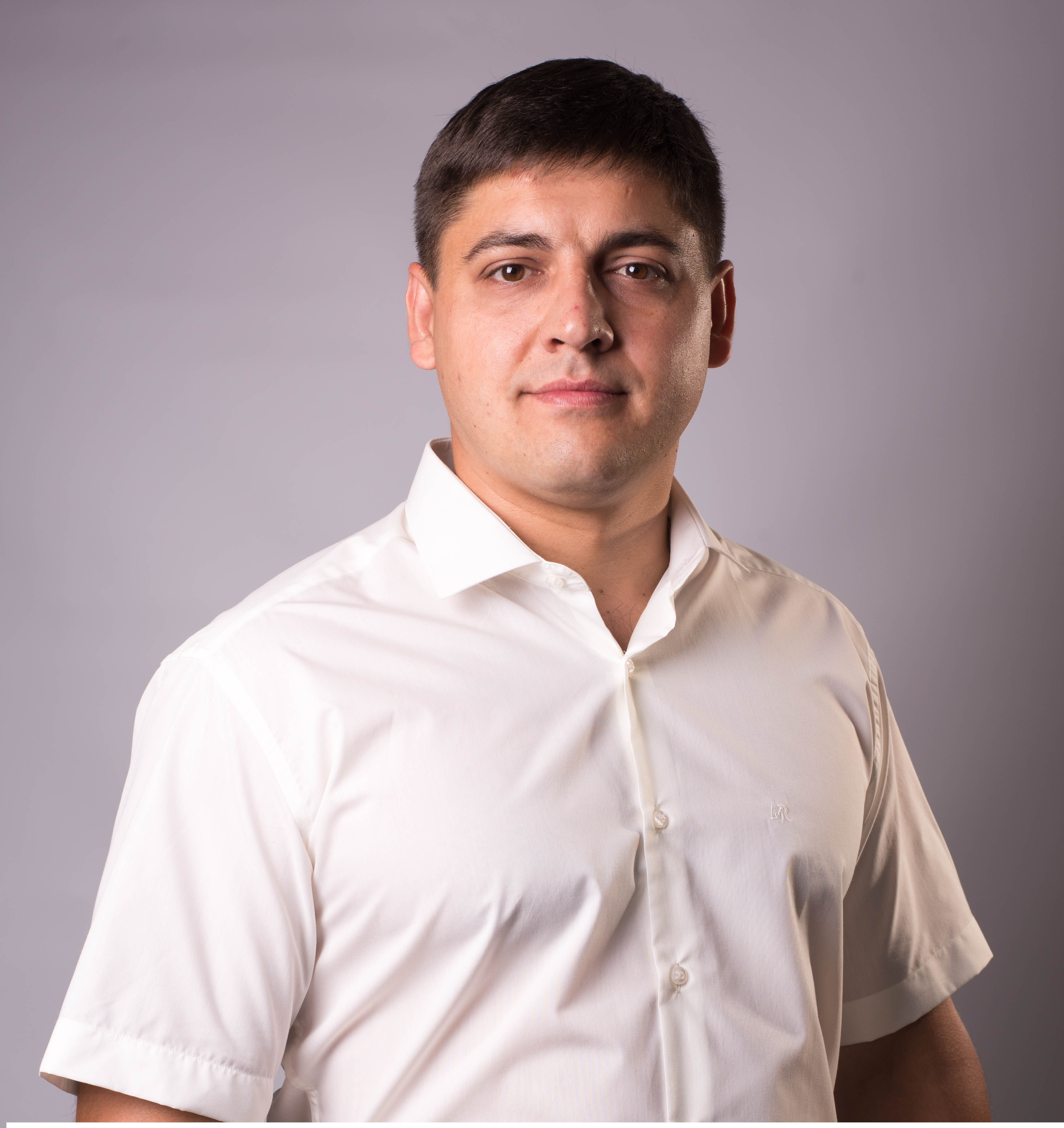
- Berezin in 2013

People's Deputy of Ukraine
- Incumbent
- Assumed office 29 August 2019
- Preceded by: Ruslan Bogdan
- Constituency: Poltava Oblast, No. 151

Personal details
- Born: 9 May 1984 (age 42) Vinnytsia, Ukrainian SSR, Soviet Union (now Ukraine)
- Party: Servant of the People
- Other political affiliations: European Party of Ukraine
- Education: National Aviation University; Sumy State University

Military service
- Allegiance: Ukraine
- Years of service: 2014–2015
- Battles/wars: Russo-Ukrainian War; War in Donbas

Maksym Yuriiovych Berezin (Ukrainian: Максим Юрійович Березін; born 9 May 1984) is a Ukrainian politician currently serving as a People's Deputy of Ukraine from Ukraine's 151st electoral district in northern Poltava Oblast since 2019. He is a member of the Servant of the People party.

== Early life and career ==
Maksym Yuriiovych Berezin was born on 9 May 1984, in the city of Vinnytsia in what was then the Soviet Union. From 2001 to 2004 he studied at the Kremenchuk Flight College of the National Aviation University. He graduated as an airplane pilot, and completed his final courses at the university in 2006. From 2005 to 2010 he worked in the State Automobile Inspection of Ukraine as an investigator.

Berezin worked at the Kremenchuk division of the International Society for Human Rights from 2010 to 2012, and subsequently worked as a teacher at the Kremenchuk Enhanced Military and Physical Training Lyceum. In 2014, following the beginning of the Russo-Ukrainian War, he joined the Armed Forces of Ukraine. He fought in the War in Donbas for a year before leaving the military. In 2016 he became head of the "Municipal Guard" of Kremenchuk, and the same year he co-founded the Natural-Ecological Control non-governmental organisation and the All-Ukrainian Union of Anti-Terrorist Operation Veterans, Military Activities, and Peacekeeping Missions.

== Political career ==
Berezin was a candidate in the 2016 by-elections, participating as a member of the European Party of Ukraine in Ukraine's 151st electoral district. He won 0.86% of the vote, compared to the winner, Ruslan Bogdan, who gathered 21.64% of the vote. During the 2019 Ukrainian presidential election Berezin was part of the campaign staff of Volodymyr Zelenskyy. Zelenskyy won the election with 74.96% of the vote in the second round.

Berezin again ran to represent the district in the 2019 Ukrainian presidential election, this time as part of Zelenskyy's Servant of the People party. This time, he was successfully elected with 47.44% of the vote, ahead of Bogdan's 15.58%.

In the Verkhovna Rada (parliament of Ukraine) Berezin is a member of the National Security, Defence, and Intelligence Committee. He is described by anti-corruption non-governmental organisation Chesno as part of a group of Servant of the People deputies closely connected to oligarch Ihor Kolomoyskyi. Berezin voted for the legalisation of medical cannabis, as well as for banning the Ukrainian Orthodox Church (Moscow Patriarchate). He supported Draft Law 5655, which Chesno criticises as placing reconstruction following the Russian invasion of Ukraine in control of property developers rather than citizens in general.
