= Ivan Bohun Military High School =

- Київський військовий ліцей імені Івана Богуна
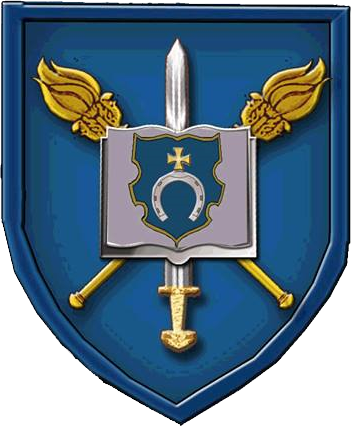

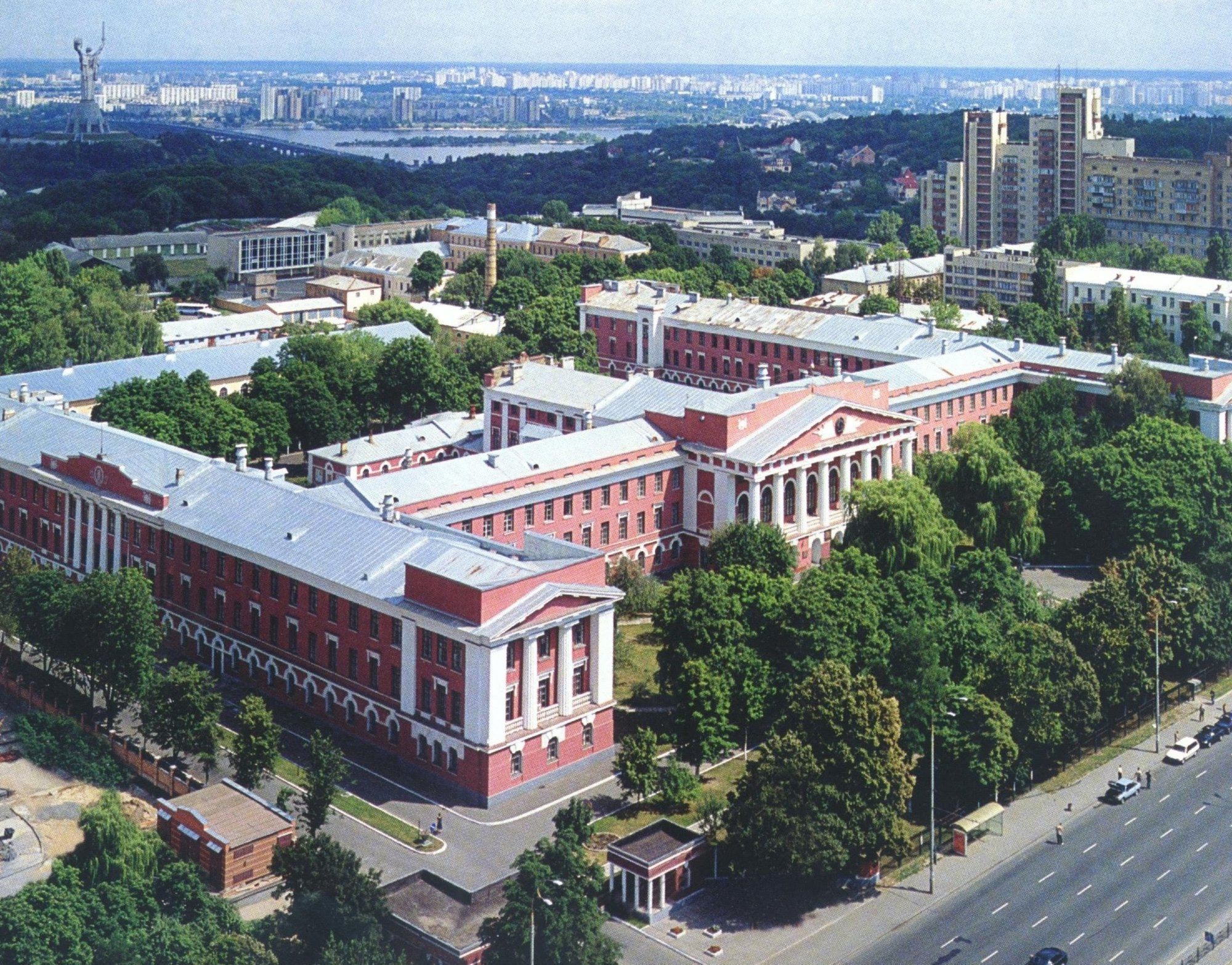

Location
- Kyiv City, 01013; Ukraine
- 50.4235°N 30.5455°E

Information
- Former name: Kiev Suvorov Military School
- Type: military academy
- Established: 1992
- Founder: Cabinet of Ministers of Ukraine
- Head of the School: Colonel Yevhen Kamalov
- Language: Ukrainian
- Color
- Affiliation: Armed Forces of Ukraine
- Website: www.kvl.mil.gov.ua

The Ivan Bohun Military High School (Ukrainian: Київський військовий ліцей імені Івана Богуна) is an educational military institution located in Kyiv, Ukraine.

== History ==
=== Soviet Era ===
It was founded in 1943 as the Kharkiv Suvorov Military School and was relocated to Kyiv in 1947. It was originally located on the Seversky Donets at Kharkov's Lenin Square. It was at the time, one of two Suvorov schools in Soviet what is now a state independent of the Russian Federation. Hundreds of pupils came from various regions of the Ukrainian SSR and the RSFSR.

=== Independence ===
On 19 August 1992, when Ukraine became independent, the school was officially renamed the Kyiv Military High School (Lyceum). This was done by decree of the Cabinet of Ministers of Ukraine. Since 1993, it has had a three-year training period. On 4 October 1994, the Kyiv Military High School's Corps of Cadets was presented with the Colours of the Armed Forces of Ukraine in a Presentation of Colours ceremony. On 1 June 1998, the Kyiv Military High School was granted the honorific Ivan Bohun. In 2001, the lyceum was awarded a diploma of the Golden Fortune International Open Rating of popularity and quality. In 2003, the lyceum was awarded the Certificate of Honor of the Verkhovna Rada of Ukraine. On 25 July 2005, by order of the head of the Main Directorate of Education and Science of the Kyiv City Council, No. 196, it was recognized with certified honors. On 24 January 2019, the monument to Alexander Suvorov, erected in front of the building of the former school in 1974, was demolished. In September of that year, the first female cadets of the school were admitted.

== Heads of the School ==
- Alexander Shkrebtienko (1993–1999)
- Leonid Kravchuk (1999–2008)
- Ihor Tcherzhevsky (2008–2010)
- Danylo Romanenko (2010–2015)
- Alexander Bondarenko (2015–2016)
- Ihor Hordiichuk (2016–2023)
- Yevhen Kamalov (2023–present)

== Structure ==
- 1st Battalion, Corps of Cadets
  - 1st Educational Company
  - 2nd Training Company
  - 3rd Training Company
  - 4th Educational Company
- 2nd Battalion, Corps of Cadets
  - 5th Educational Company
  - 6th Educational Company
- Military band
  - Corps of Drums

=== Band ===
The Military Band of the Ivan Bohun Military High School is intended for the musical support of conducting military ceremonies, laying wreaths to the monuments and graves of soldiers, and parades of cadets. The creative activity of the collective is primarily aimed at the spiritual and patriotic development of military high school students and the revival and development of the national culture of Ukraine. Each year, about 170 events are carried out according to the plan of the school administration. It is multi-genre creative group of 20 performers on wind and percussion instruments. The band works in tandem with the Band of the Military Institute of Telecommunications and Information Technologies.

== Student life ==
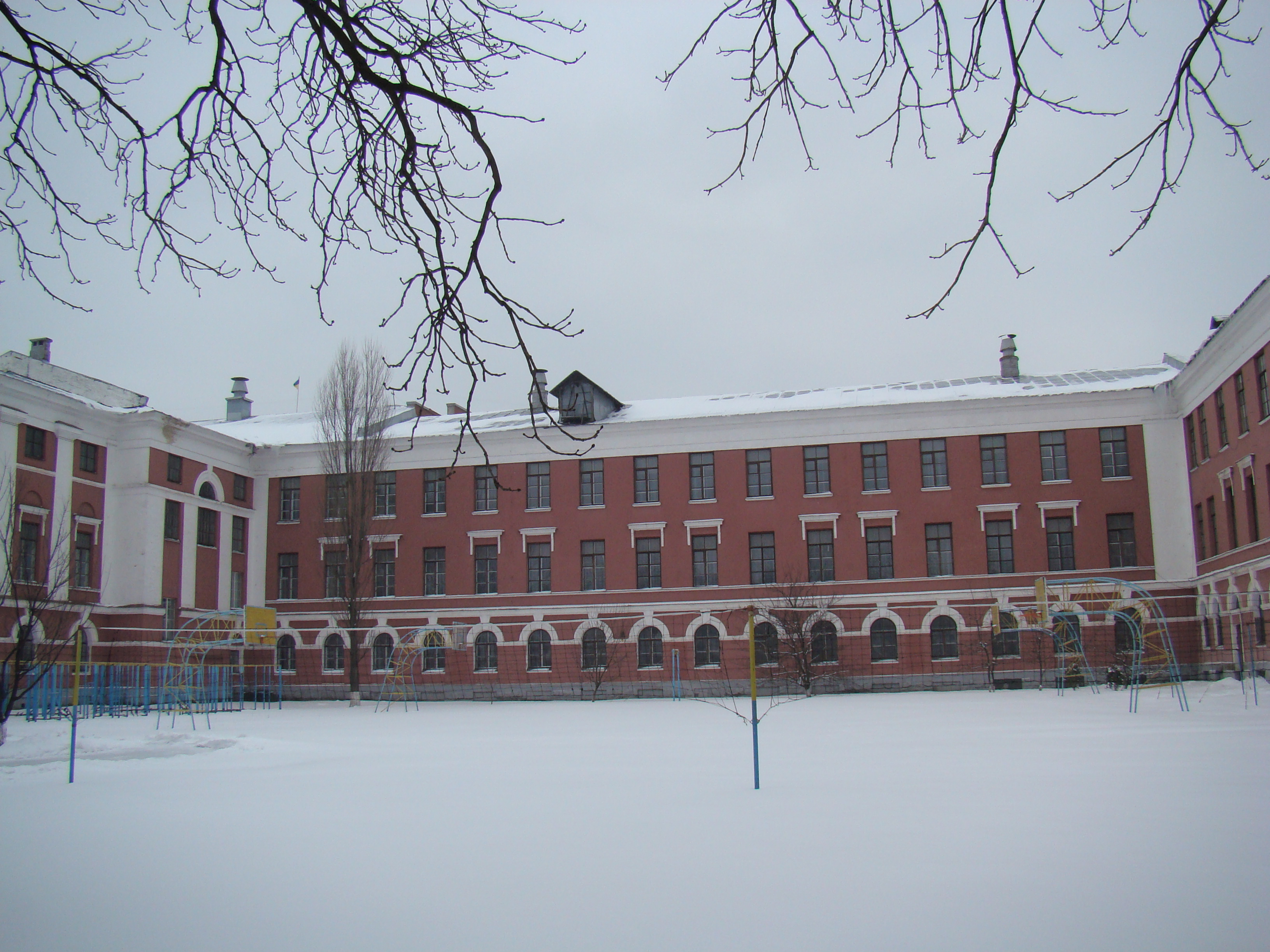
The building in the winter time.

As part of the military-patriotic education of youth, the cadets and high school staff take part in the following:

- Celebrations hosted by the President of Ukraine, the Minister of Defense, the Mayor of Kyiv on the occasion of Victory Day and the Day of the Liberation of Ukraine, Defender of Ukraine Day and Holodomor Remembrance Day.
- Holding public celebrations at the Palace "Ukraine", International Palace of Culture and Arts, the Central House of Officers of the Armed Forces of Ukraine, patriotic events dedicated to commemorate Ivan Bohun, Taras Shevchenko, war veterans and victims of the Chernobyl accident.
- Cadets participate actively in the life of the capital of Ukraine and regular participants in events with the participation of the state and its armed forces.
- Regularly participating in the Kyiv Independence Day Parade, opening the parade as part of the corps of drums and its own battalion.

=== Building ===
The main educational building of the high school, located on no.25 Lesya Ukrainka Boulevard, is the building of the former Oleksiiv Engineering College (built in 1914-1916 ). The building is an object of cultural heritage of the city of Kyiv.

== Notable alumni and employees ==
=== Alumni ===
- Alexey Oshechkov
- Alexander Porkhun
- Yevgeny Shamataluk

=== Employees ===
- Honored Artist of Ukraine Vitaly Svyrid
- Lieutenant Yulia Mykytenko
- Major Oleksandr Kukurba

== Gallery ==
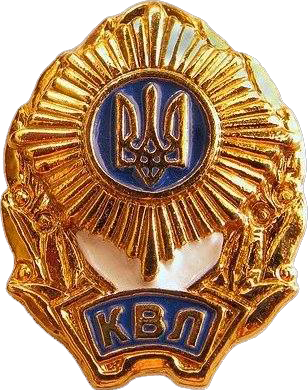
The badge of the school.

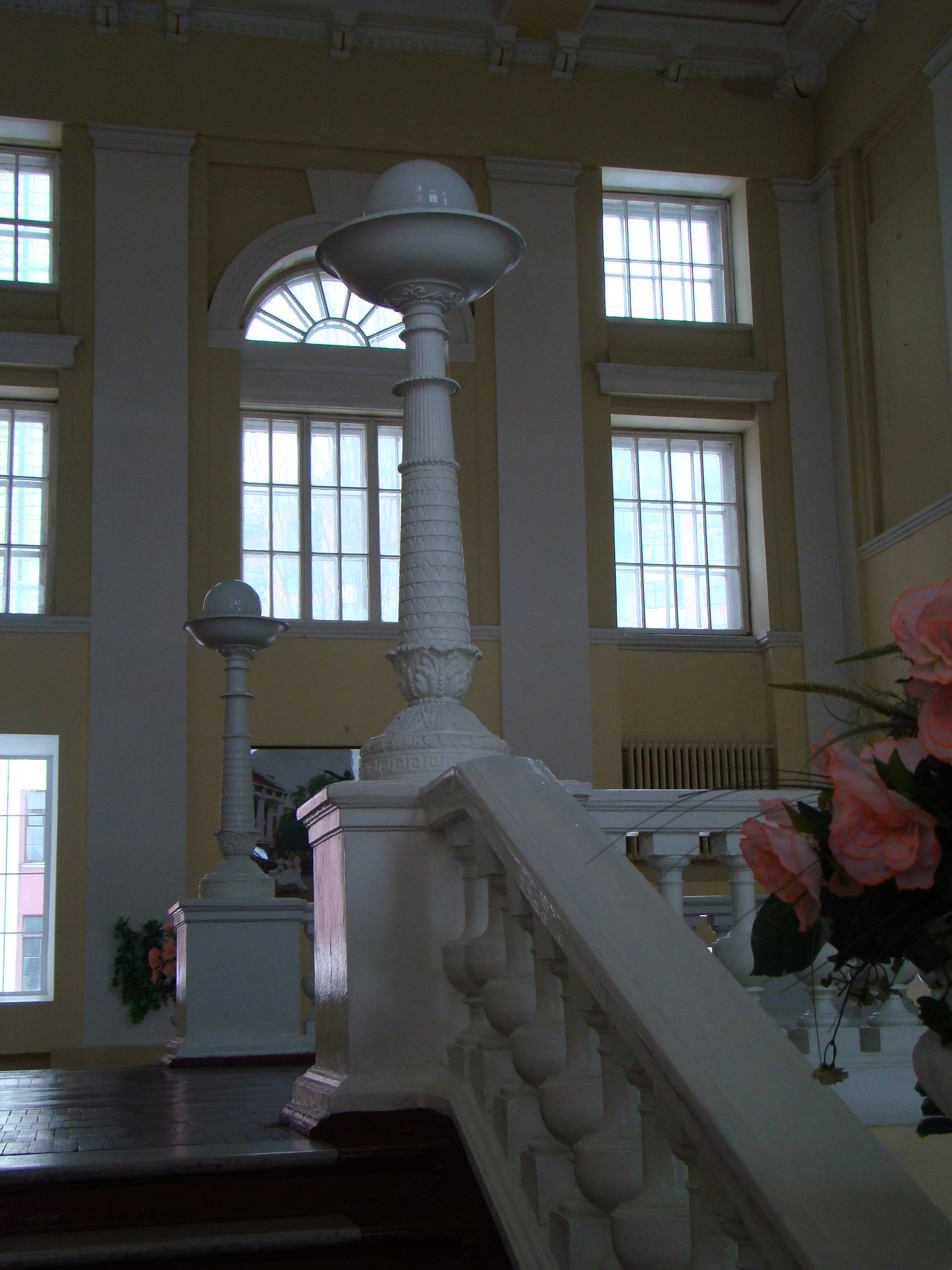
The inside of the building.

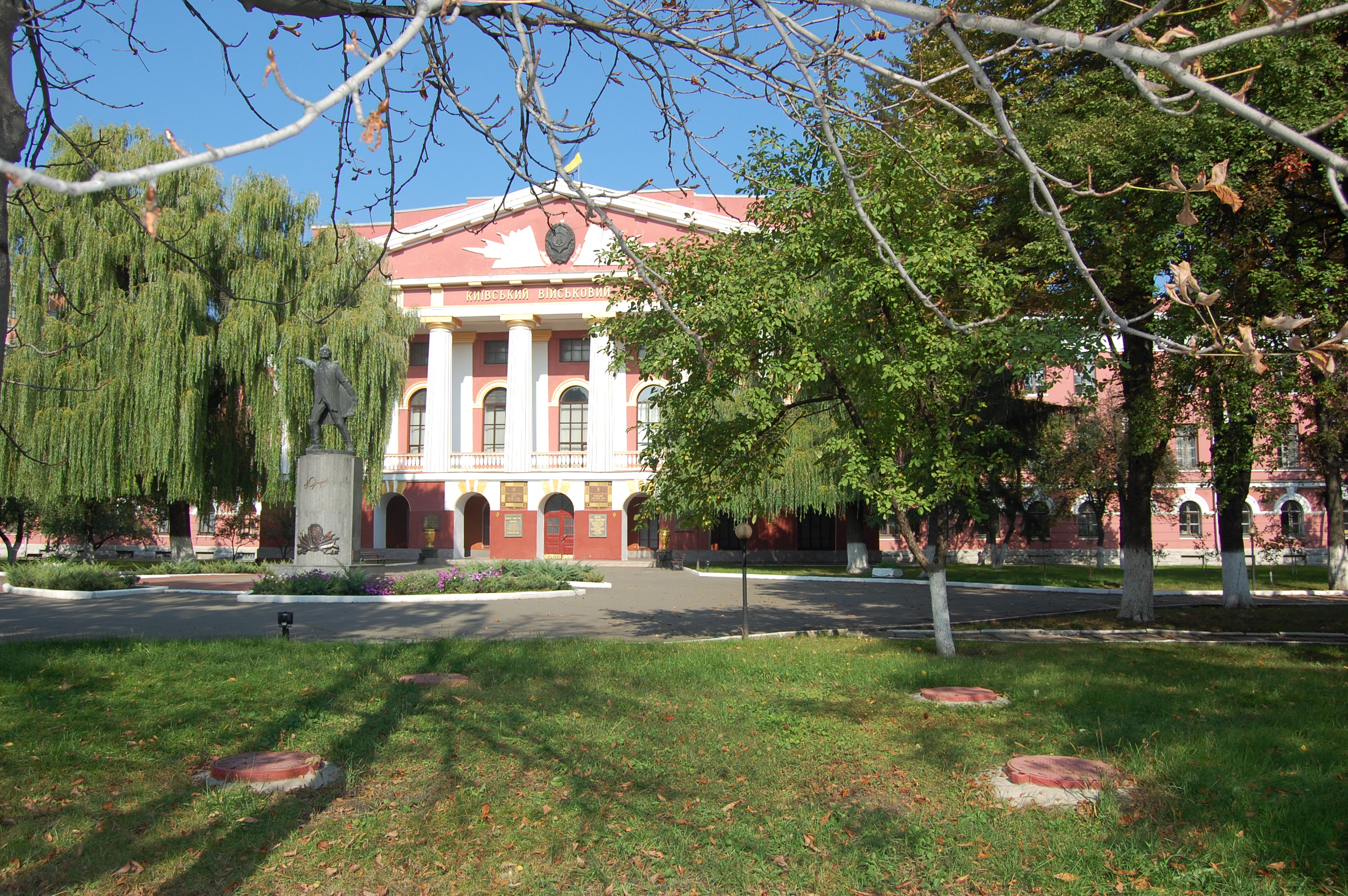
The building in the summertime.

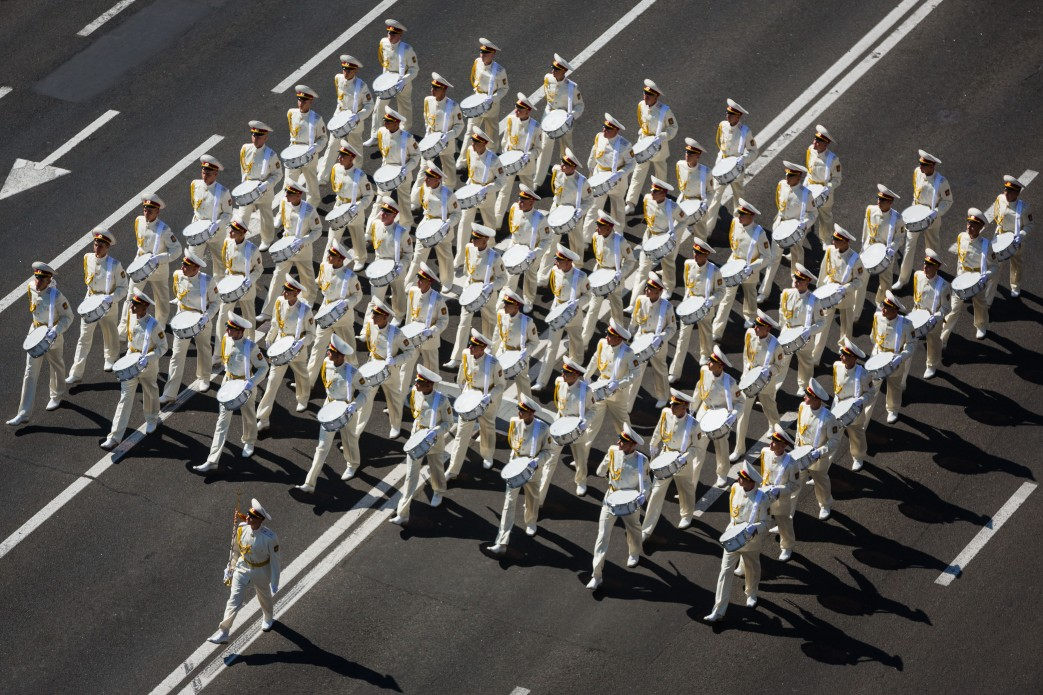
The corps of drums on Maidan Nezalezhnosti.

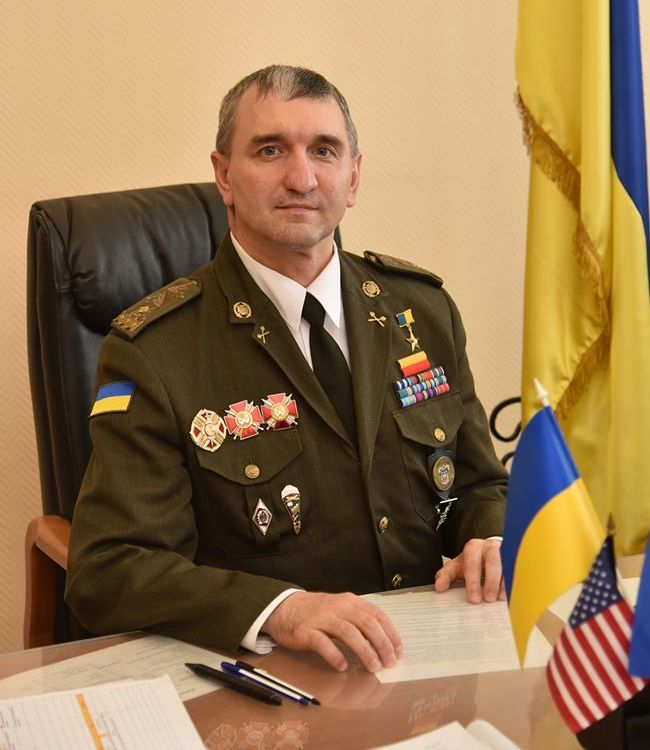
Ihor Hordiychuk

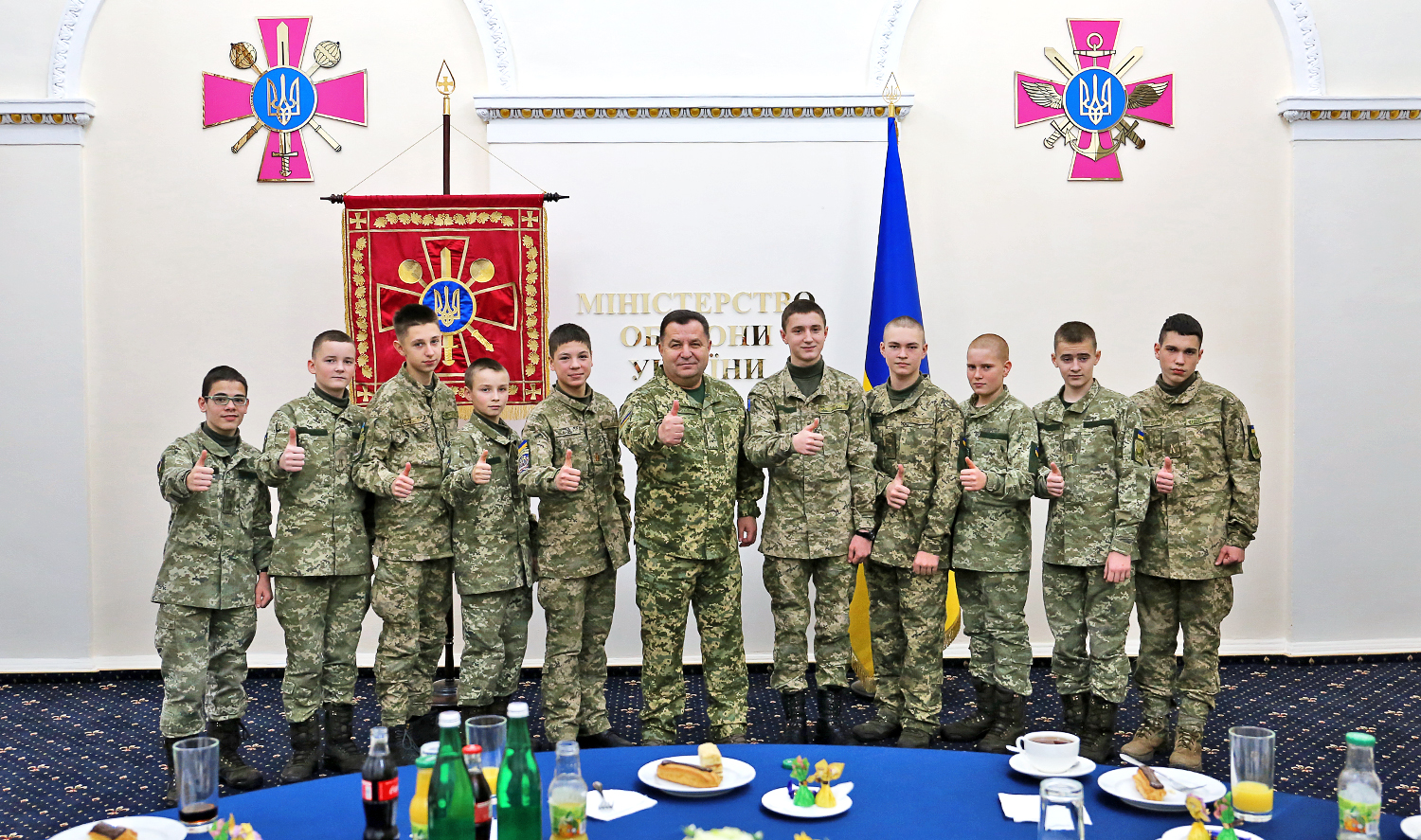
Stepan Poltorak with school cadets.

== See also ==
- Kiev Suvorov Military School
- Ivan Bohun
- Suvorov Military School
