= Oleksandr Volodymyrovych Slipchenko =

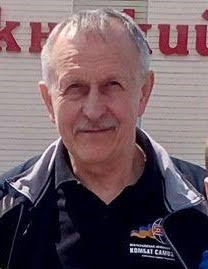
- Born: 1954 (age 71–72); Ukraine
- Citizenship: Ukraine
- Occupations: martial arts coach, public figure
- Known for: President of the All-Ukrainian Martial Arts Association "Combat Self Defense ICO"
- Awards: Honored Coach of Ukraine, Honored Worker of Physical Culture and Sports of Ukraine

Oleksandr Volodymyrovych Slipchenko (Ukrainian: Сліпченко Олександр Володимирович) is a Ukrainian coach, Honored Coach of Ukraine, Honored Worker of Physical Culture and Sports of Ukraine, and president of the martial arts association "Combat Self Defense ICO".

== Biography ==
He began his coaching career in 1977. He specializes in combat sports, including kickboxing and Thai boxing, and since 2015 has focused on the "Combat Self Defense ICO" discipline.

Among Slipchenko's trainees are 6 Honored Masters of Sport, 23 Masters of Sport of International Class, 35 Masters of Sport of Ukraine, and medalists of world and European championships, including:

- Dmytro Konstantinov — kickboxing (2007, 2010, 2014, 2015);
- Andrii Zakharov — Combat Self Defense ICO (2018);
- Mykyta Diukarev — Combat Self Defense ICO (2007), kickboxing (2025);
- Denys Denysenko — kickboxing.

Slipchenko's coaching school has representative offices in the United States, the United Kingdom, Poland, Spain, Laos, and Vietnam.

== Public activity ==
In 2015, Slipchenko and Mykola Zentsev registered the martial arts association "Combat Self Defense ICO" in Ukraine and began developing it; the association became part of the World Sports Association of Martial Arts Combat Self Defense ICO, whose activity began in Great Britain in 2009.

In 2017, the Ministry of Youth and Sports of Ukraine recognized and began promoting this discipline as a separate non-Olympic sport.

Since 2020, the "Combat Self Defense ICO" association has held the status of the National Federation of Ukraine for Combat Sports.

=== Achievements of the Ukrainian national team ===
Ukraine's national team in Combat Self Defense ICO regularly places among the medalists at ICO international competitions.

- 2016 — European Championship, Rome (Italy) — 1st place
- 2017 — World Championship, Birmingham (Great Britain) — 3rd place
- 2018 — World Championship, Rome (Italy) — 2nd place
- 2019 — World Championship, Motherwell (Scotland) — 3rd place
- 2021 — European Championship, Zalaegerszeg (Hungary) — 1st place
- 2022 — World Championship, Nagykanizsa (Hungary) — 2nd place
- 2023 — European Championship, Nagykanizsa (Hungary) — 1st place
- 2023 — World Championship, Hull (Great Britain) — 3rd place
- 2024 — European Championship, Catania (Italy) — 1st place
- 2024 — World Championship, Frankfurt am Main (Germany) — 2nd place
- 2025 — World Championship, Swansea (Great Britain) — 5th place
- 2026 — European Championship, Lübeck (Germany) — 1st place

== Gallery ==
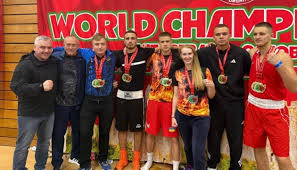
Combat sports World Championship, Swansea, Wales, United Kingdom, 2025

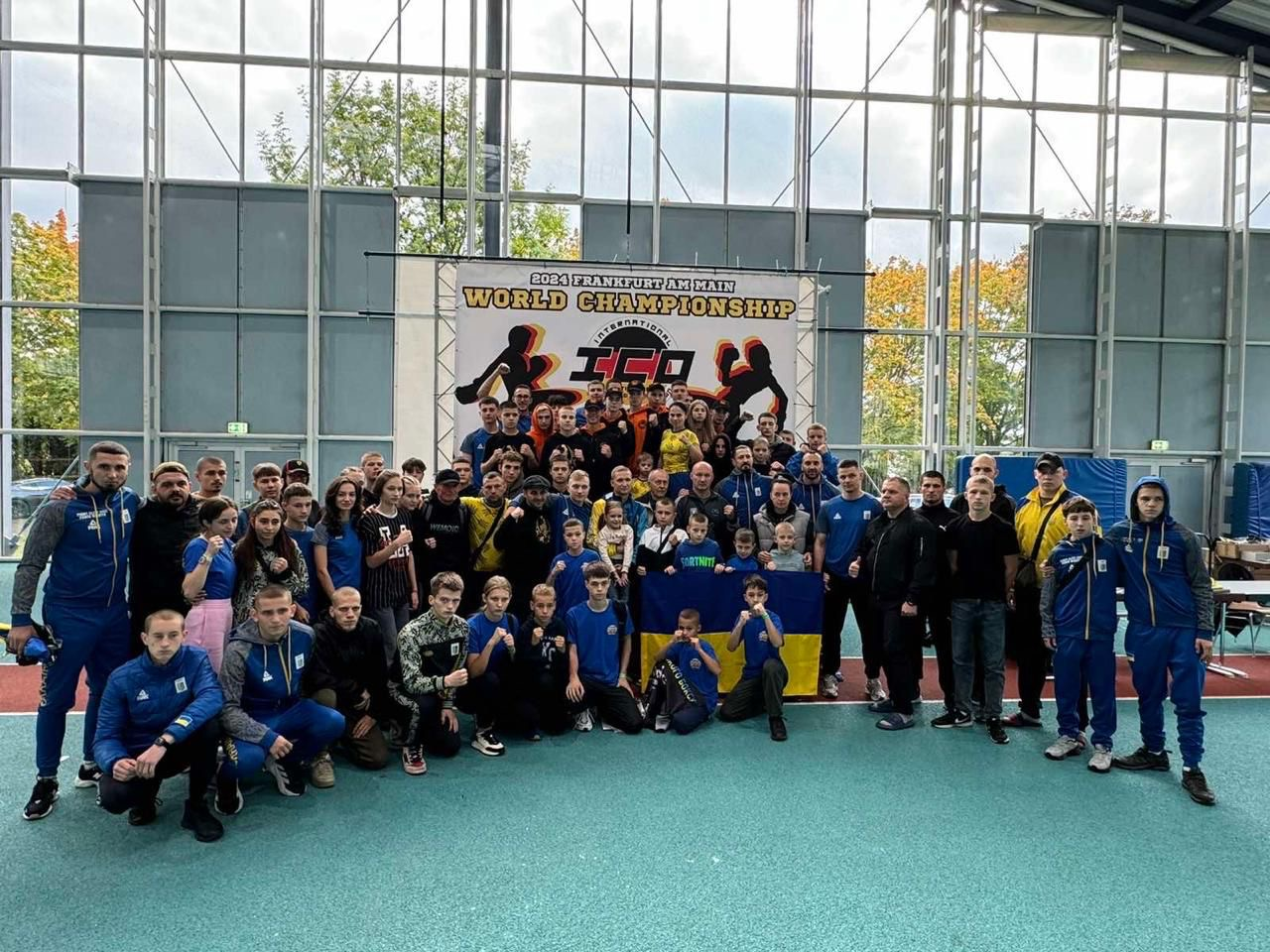
Tournament of the All-Ukrainian Martial Arts Association "Combat Self Defense ICO"

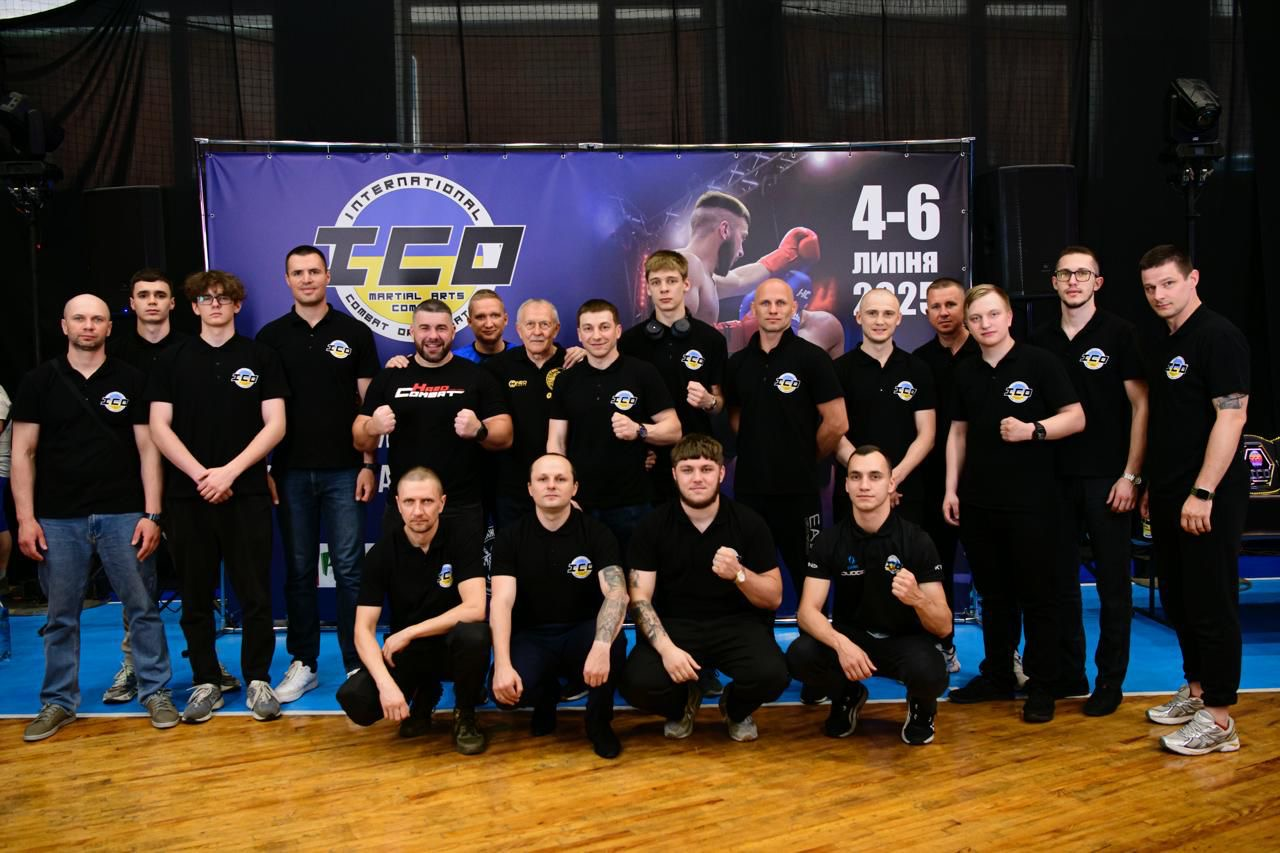
During "Combat Self Defense ICO" competitions in Ukraine

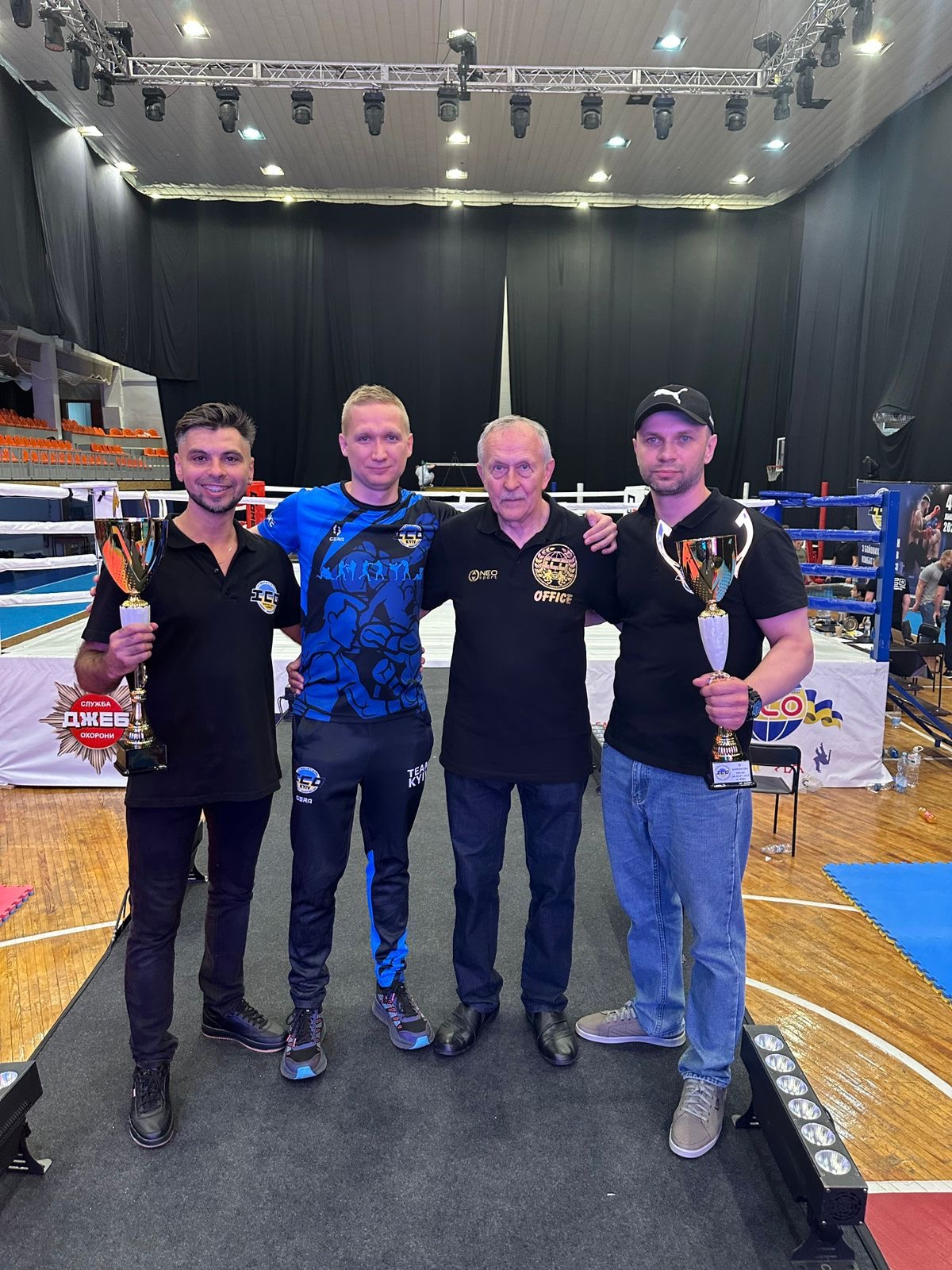
Honored coach of the federation Oleksandr Slipchenko with athletes at the 2024 World Championship

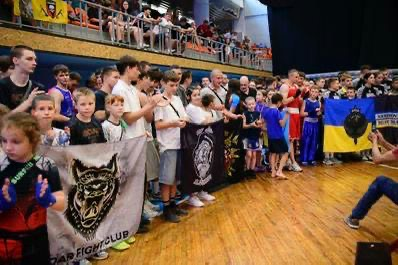
Tournament of the All-Ukrainian Martial Arts Association "Combat Self Defense ICO"

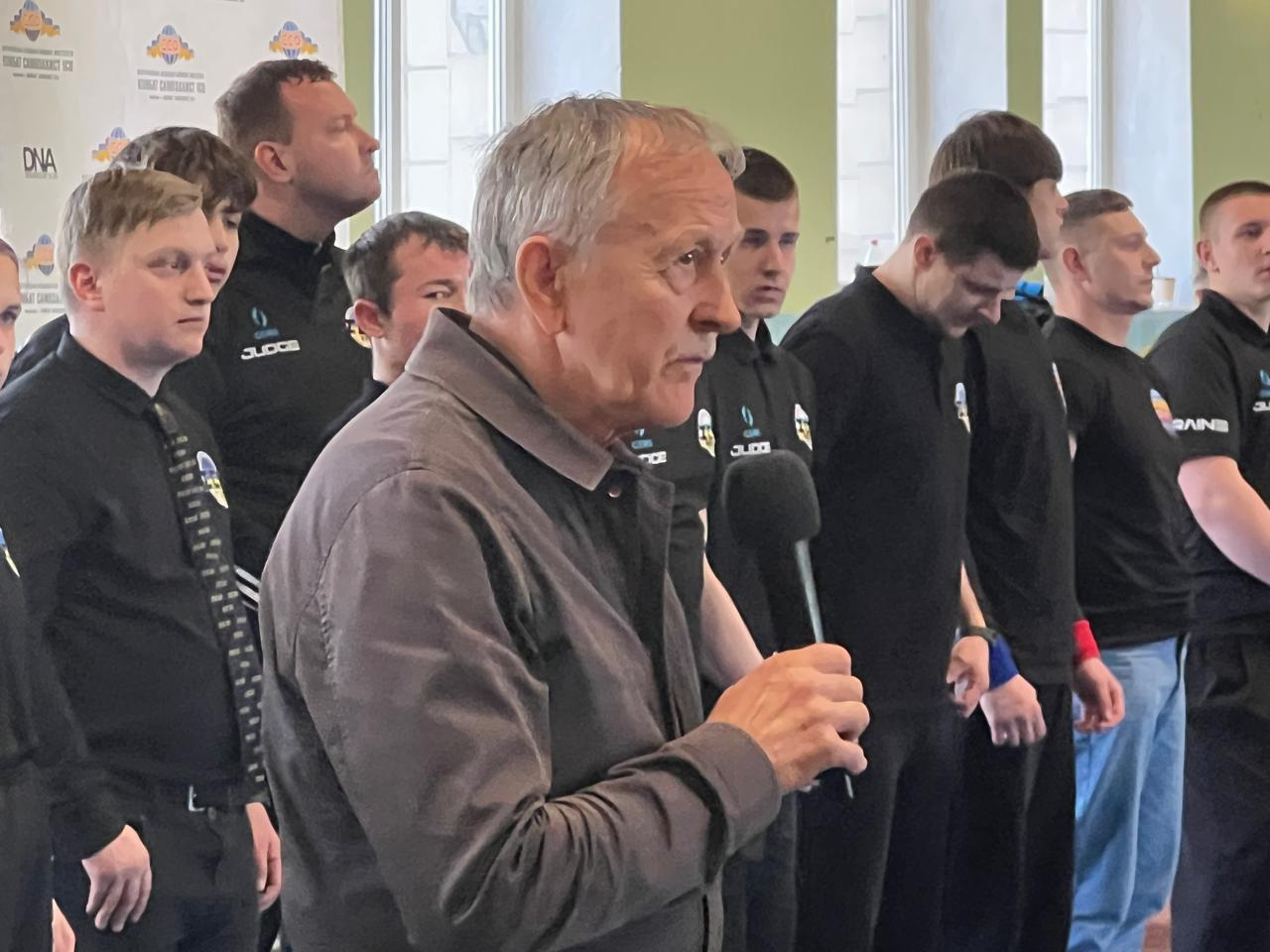
Honored Coach and Honored Worker of Physical Culture and Sports of Ukraine Oleksandr Slipchenko, under whose sporting leadership this sport was united by the National Federation of Combat Sports "Combat Self Defense ICO".

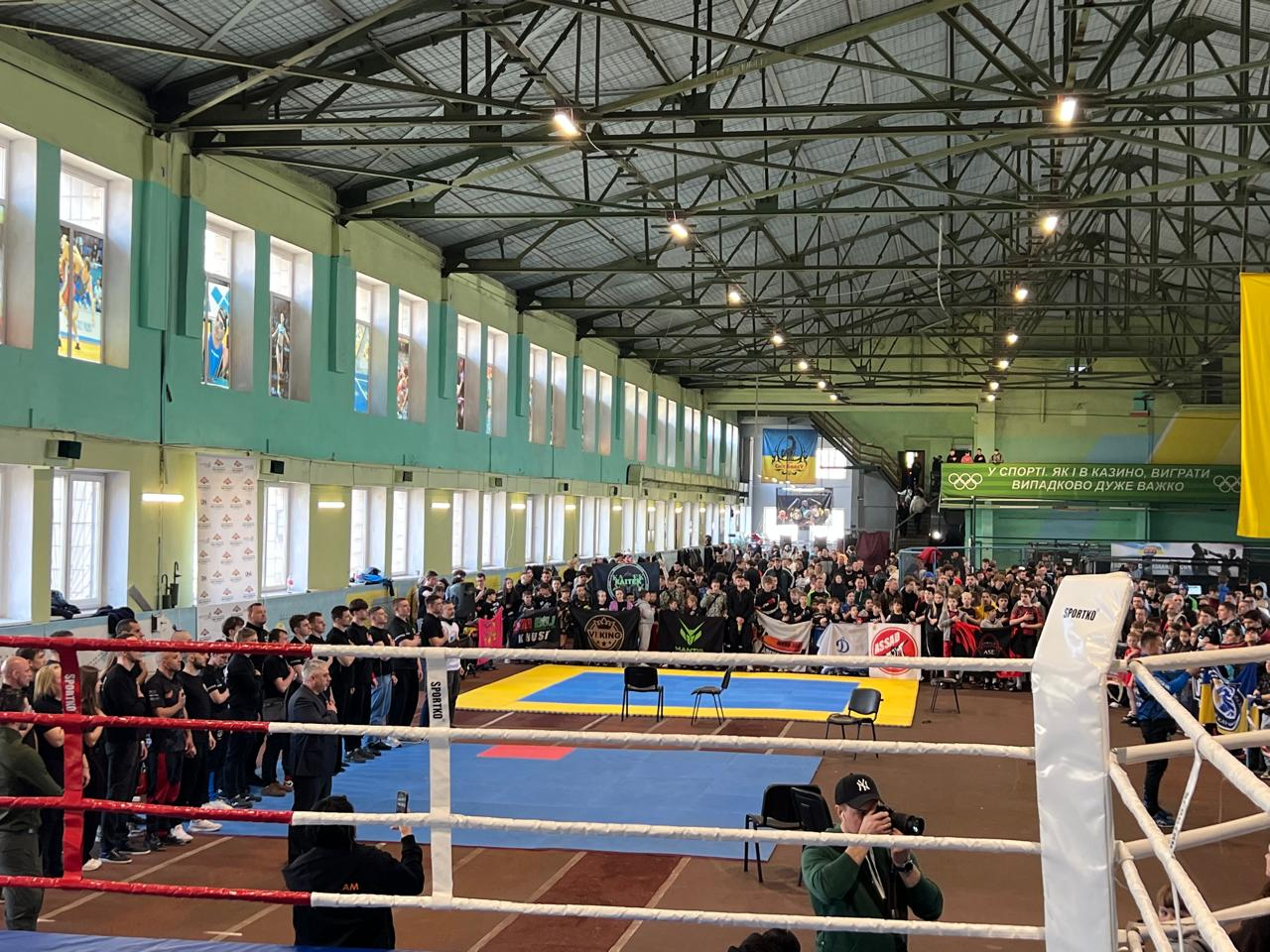
Opening of the "Combat Self Defense ICO" combat sports championship, 1–3 May 2026, which brought together nearly a thousand athletes and coaches from 22 oblasts of the country.

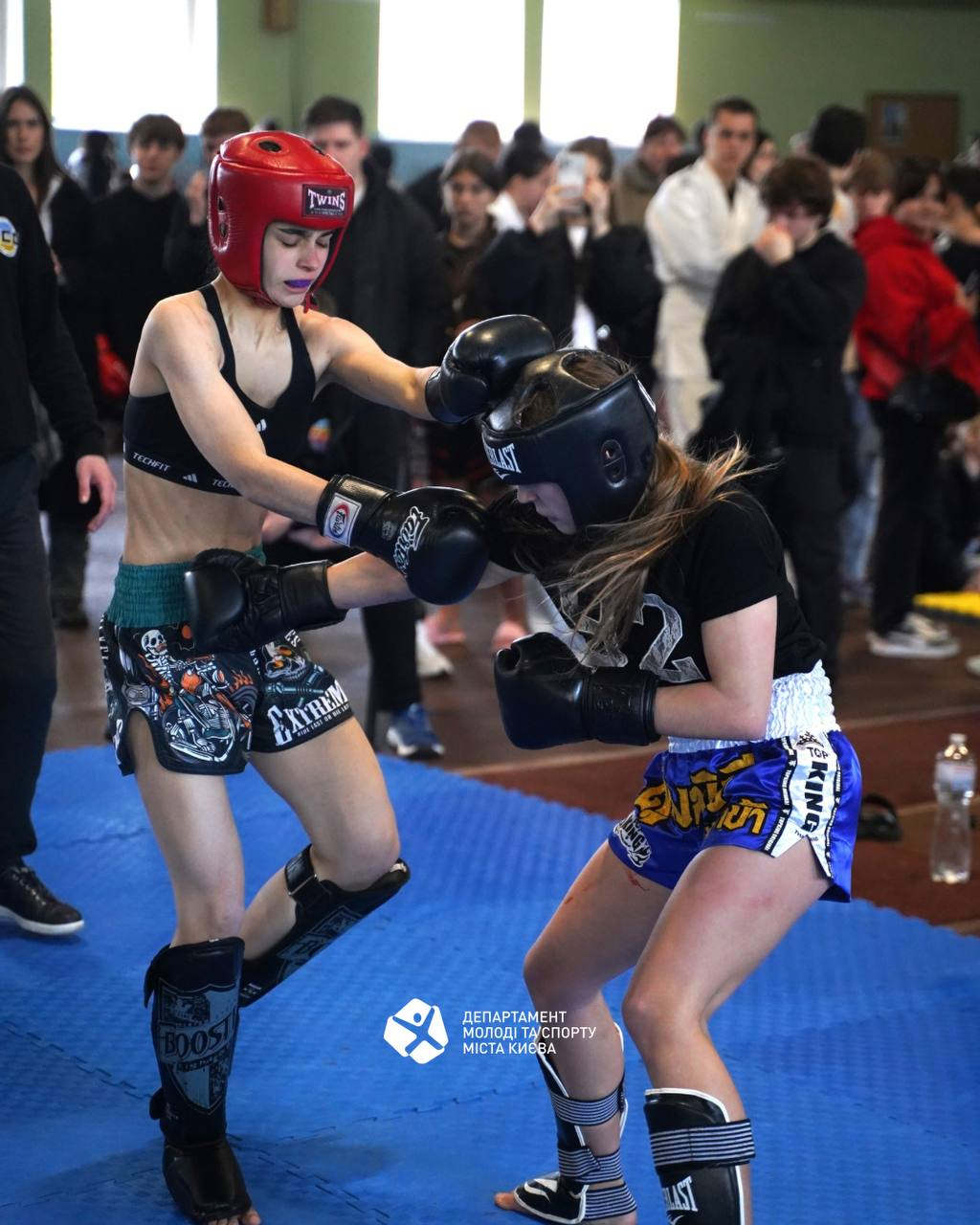
Women's bout. "Combat Self Defense ICO" combat sports championship, 1–3 May 2026.

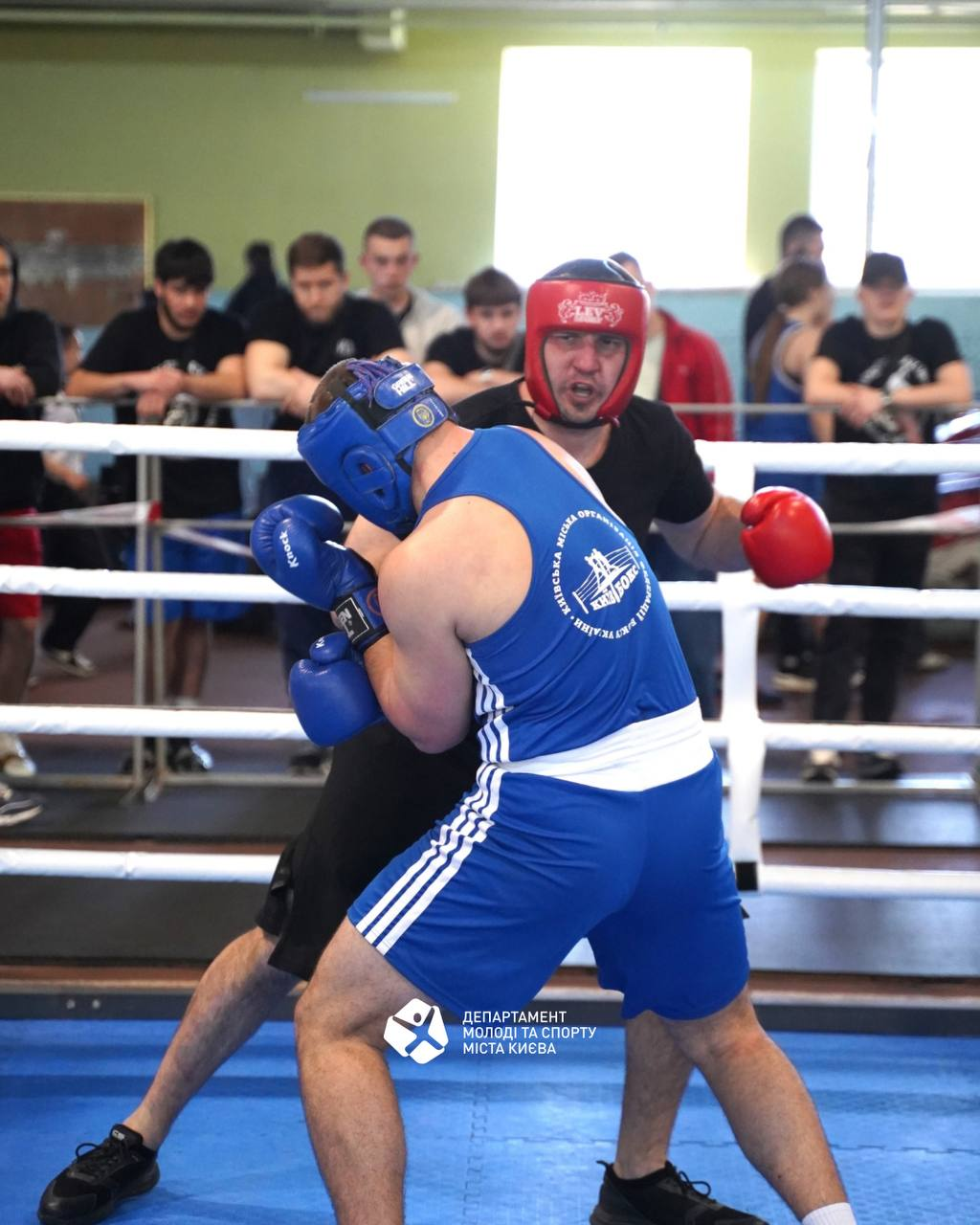
A "Combat Self Defense ICO" combat sports championship was held in Ukraine, 1–3 May 2026
