= Kyiv Suvorov Military School =

- Київське суворовське військове училище
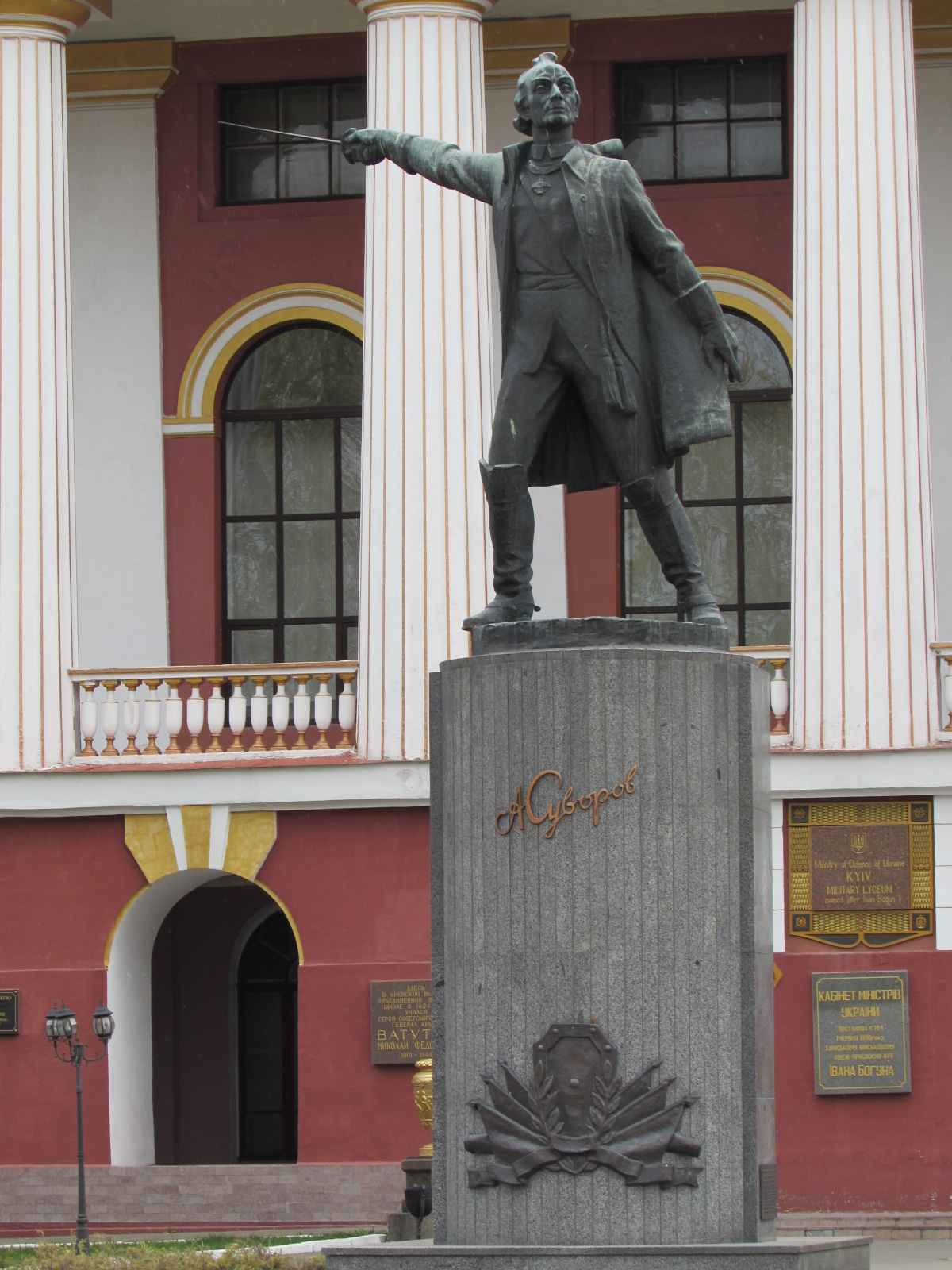
- The monument to Alexander Suvorov at the Ivan Bohun Military High School, which was erected when the high school was known as the Suvorov Military School during the Soviet era.
- Other name: KvSVU
- Former name: Kharkov Suvorov Military School
- Type: military academy
- Active: 1943–1992
- Founder: Cabinet of Ministers of Ukraine
- Affiliations: Armed Forces of the Soviet Union
- Location: Kyiv, Ukrainian SSR, Soviet Union
- Language: Russian, Ukrainian
- Website: ksvu.kiev.ua

The Kyiv Suvorov Military School (KvSVU) (Ukrainian: Київське суворовське військове училище, Russian: Киевское суворовское военное училище) was a boarding school in Kyiv, the capital of the Ukrainian SSR. It was affiliated to Suvorov Military School in the USSR for military cadets. It was succeeded with the Ivan Bohun Military High School following Ukraine's independence in 1991.

== History ==
It was founded on 27 September 1943 as the Kharkiv Suvorov Military School. It was located on the Donets near Kharkiv's Lenin Square. On 1 July 1947, the school was relocated from Kharkiv to Kyiv, where it was renamed the Kyiv Suvorov Officers School. On 20 September 1943, Major General Pyotr Eremin took over the command of the school. According to the Department of Military Educational Institutions of the Red Army, from 18 to 20 November 1943, 415 pupils from the Kharkiv and Voroshilovgrad regions of the Ukrainian SSR, as well as from Voronezh, Kursk, Tula and the Moscow Oblast of the RSFSR. The school was located in the building of the former 2nd Kyiv Red Banner College of self-propelled artillery named after Mikhail Frunze. On 1 August 1955, it was renamed to the Suvorov Military School. In 1992, by the decree of the Cabinet of Ministers of Ukraine on 19 August 1992, the Ivan Bohun Military High School was established on the basis of the Kyiv Suvorov Military School.

Over the years, 44 graduations of cadets have been conducted. In 1953, cadets of the school marched in the October Revolution Parade on Moscow's Red Square. Prior to that, it had also taken part in the International Workers' Day parade on the square since 1951. On 24 January 2019, the monument to Alexander Suvorov, erected in front of the building of the former school in 1974, was demolished.

== Heads of the school ==
- 1943-1944 - Peter Eremin
- 1944-1945 - Viktor Vizzhilin
- 1945-1954 - Andrei Tomashevsky
- 1954-1956 - Ivan Kisses
- 1956-1958 - Terenty Umansky
- 1958-1970 - Boris Kibardin
- 1970-1985 - Ivan Kaurkin
- 1985-1992 - Viktor Sidorov

== Notable alumni ==
- Ruslan Bogdan – Ukrainian businessman and politician
- Viktor Bondar – Former Minister of Transport and Communication of Ukraine
- Anatoliy Hrytsenko – Minister of Defence of Ukraine
- Mikhail Davydov – Russian doctor and oncologist
- Anatoly Kostenko – Former Minister of Defence of Belarus

== See also ==
- Minsk Suvorov Military School
- Tiraspol Suvorov Military School
