= Palace of Sports =

Various sporting venues

Palace of Sports or Sports Palace (Russian: Дворец спорта, romanized: Dvorets sporta; Ukrainian: Палац спорту, romanized: Palats sportu) is a generic name of comprehensive indoors sports venues introduced in the Soviet Union (compare with Palace of Culture) of big size that includes various sports halls and auxiliary space, primarily designated to host sports events in front of spectators.

As a name, it is still used in several post-Soviet states and other formerly Soviet-aligned socialist states like Vietnam. Many of them had standard architectural designs. Some of them were renamed, e.g., into Palace of Concerts and Sports.

The term is also used in other countries. For example, the term is Palacio de los Deportes in Hispanophone countries or Palais des Sports in Francophone countries.

== Notable Palaces of Sports ==
=== Other former Soviet states ===
Vilnius Palace of Concerts and Sports

- Kyiv Palace of Sports (built in 1960), Kyiv, Ukraine
- Meteor Palace of Sports (1980), Dnipro, Ukraine
- Tbilisi Sports Palace (built in 1961), Tbilisi, Georgia
- Vilnius Palace of Concerts and Sports (1971), Vilnius, Lithuania was included in the "Registry of Cultural Values" in 2006.
- Minsk Sports Palace, Minsk, Belarus
- Kazakhstan Sports Palace, Nur-Sultan, Kazakhstan
- Boris Alexandrov Sports Palace, Oskemen, Kazakhstan
- Baluan Sholak Sports Palace, Almaty, Kazakhstan

=== Other countries ===
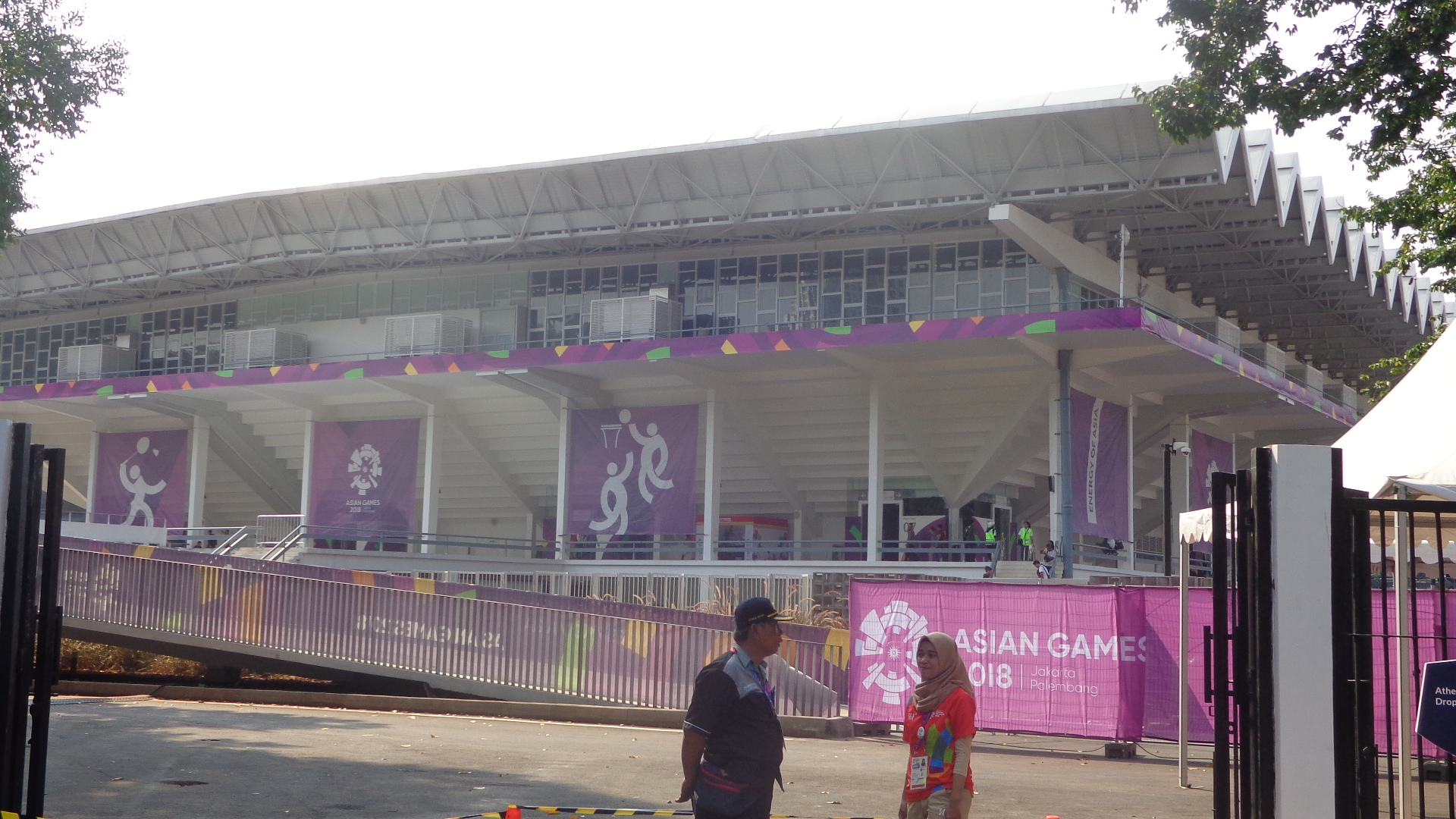
Istana Olahraga Gelora Bung Karno

- Berlin Sportpalast, Germany, mostly known for its Nazi Party rallies
- Istana Olahraga Gelora Bung Karno (1961), Jakarta, Indonesia
- Royal Bafokeng Sports Palace, Rustenburg, South Africa

=== Palacio de los Deportes ===
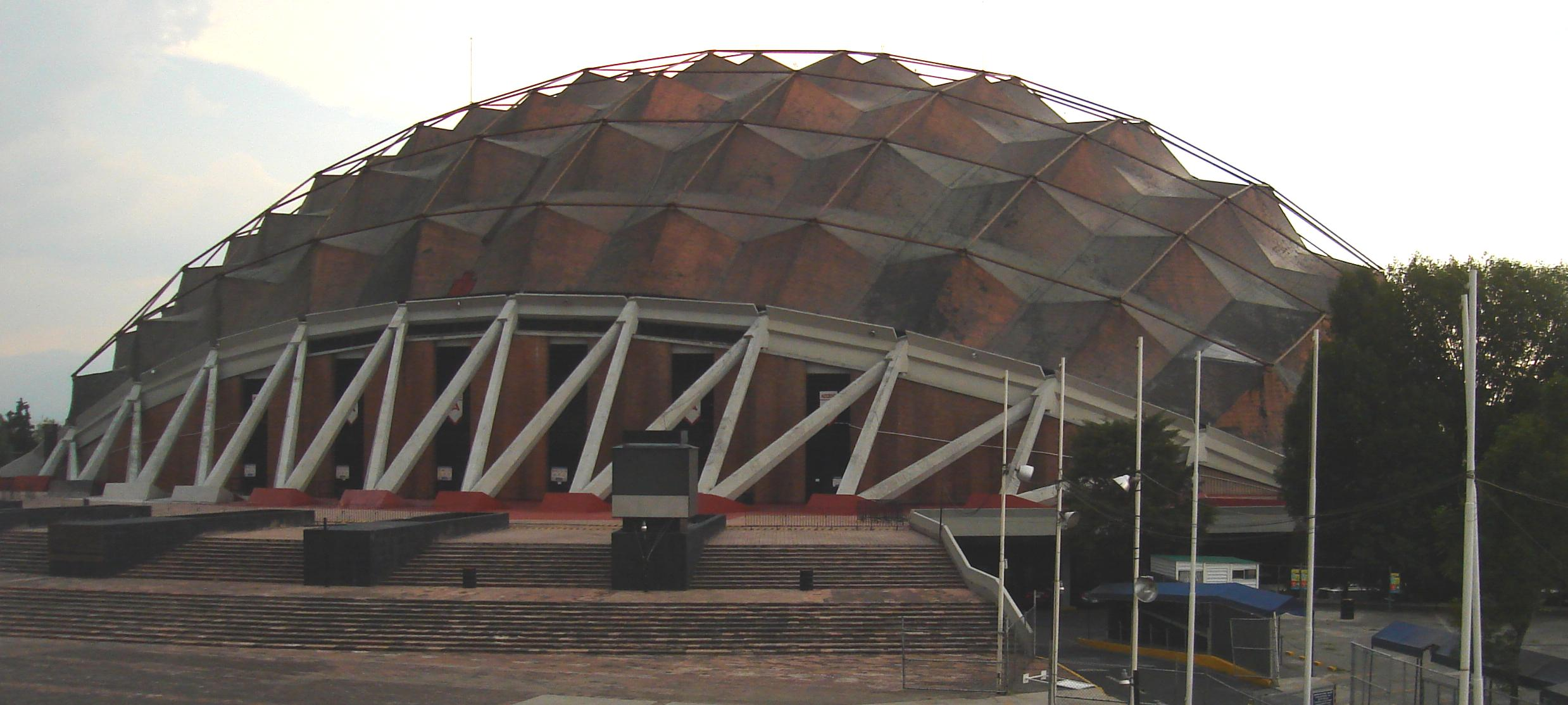
Palacio de los Deportes, Mexico City

- Palacio de los Deportes, Mexico City, Mexico
- Palacio de los Deportes, Heredia, Costa Rica
- Palacio de los Deportes Virgilio Travieso Soto, Santo Domingo, Dominican Republic
- Palacio de los Deportes del Cibao, Santiago de los Caballeros, Dominican Republic
- Palacio de Recreación y Deportes, Mayagüez, Puerto Rico
- Palacio de los Deportes de Torrevieja, Torrevieja, Spain.
- Palacio de los Deportes de La Rioja, Logroño, Spain

=== Palacio de Deportes ===
- Palacio de Deportes de Gijón
- Palacio de Deportes de Santander
- Palacio de Deportes de la Comunidad de Madrid
- Palacio de Deportes de Murcia
- Palacio de Deportes de Granada
- Palacio de Deportes de San Pablo
- Palacio de Deportes Mediterráneo, Almería, Spain

=== Palais des Sports ===
- Palais des Sports (disambiguation), for French venues

=== Palazzo dello Sport ===
- Palazzo dello Sport (disambiguation), for Italian venues

== Other Soviet entertainment complexes (Dvorets) ==
- Palace of Culture (Palace of Arts and Creativity i.e. Palace of Arts "Ukraina")
- Pioneers Palace (House of Young Pioneers)
- People's House, previous term that existed in the Russian Empire
- House of the Red Army (DKA)
- House of Military Officers
- Palace of the Soviets (special case)

== See also ==
- Palats Sportu
- Sports complex
