= Community centre =

Centre for the local community

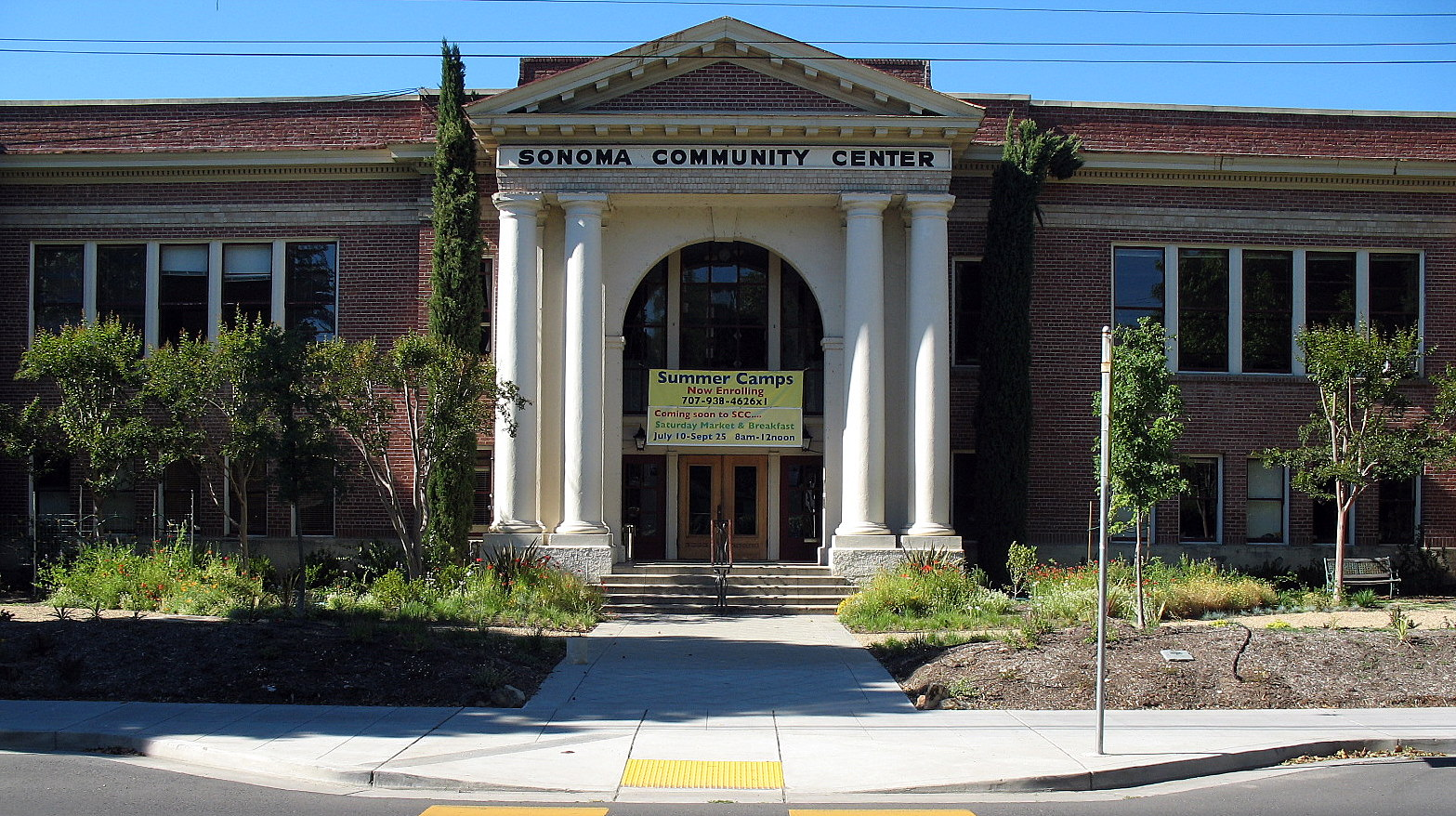
Sonoma Community Center in Sonoma, California.

A community centre, community center, or community hall is a public location where members of a community gather for group activities, social support, public information, and other purposes. They may be open for the whole community or for a specialised subgroup within the greater community. Community centres can be religious in nature, such as Christian churches, Islamic mosques, Jewish synagogues, Hindu temples, or Buddhist temples; though they can also be secular and in some cases government-run, such as youth clubs or Leisure centres.

== Uses ==
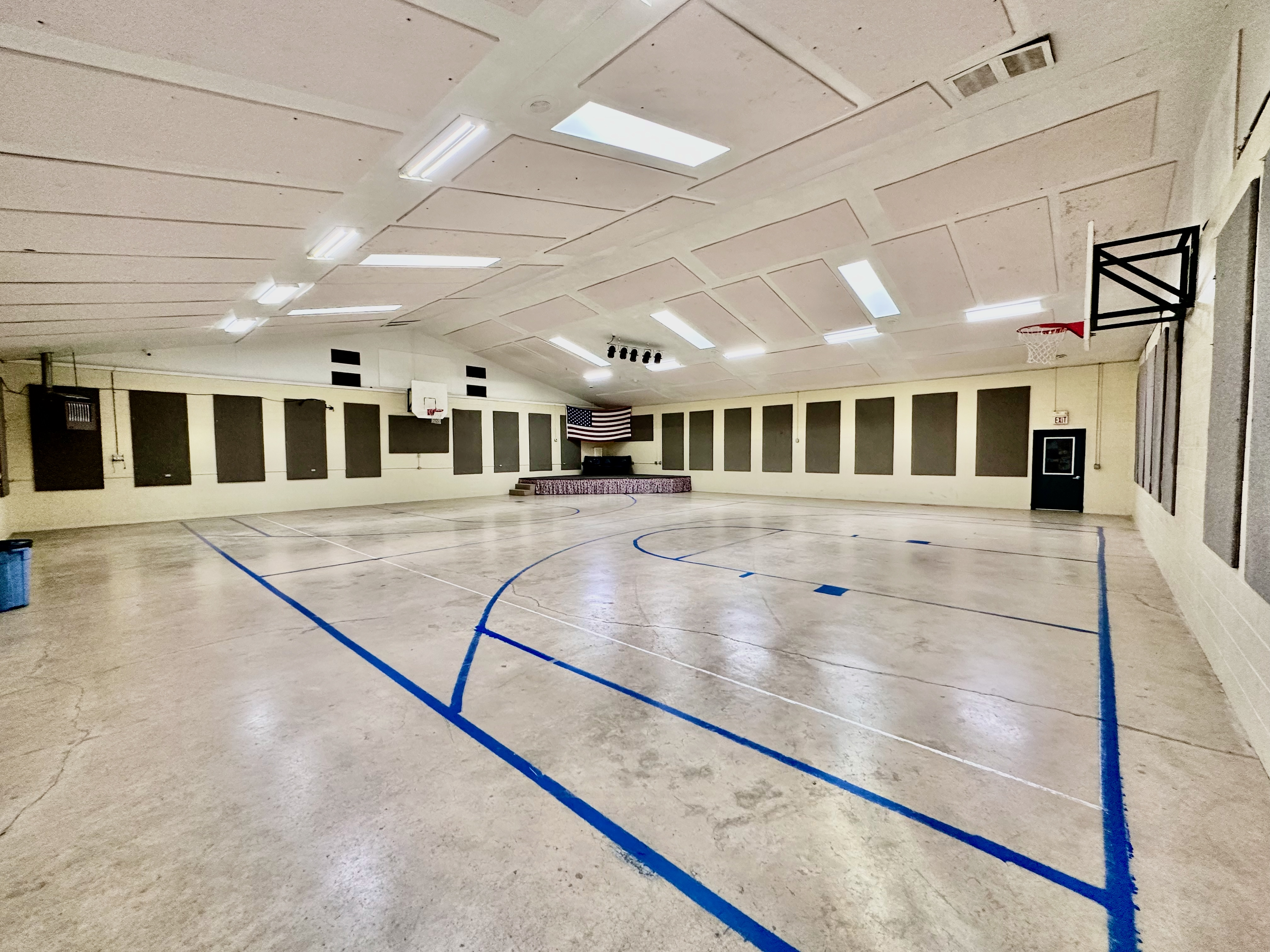
The interior of a community center in Brasstown, North Carolina

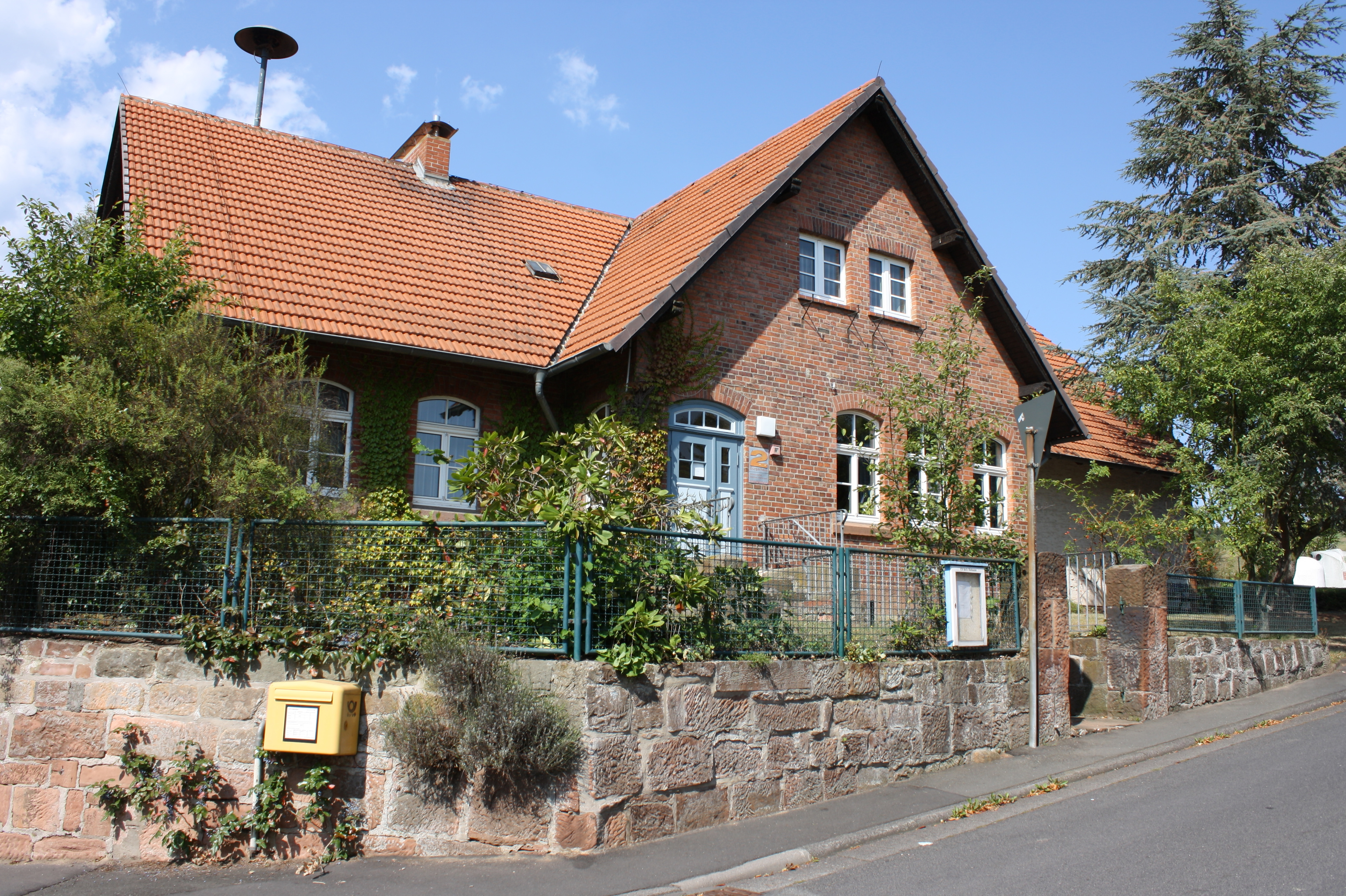
Community centre in Marburg an der Lahn, Germany.

The community centres are usually used for:

- Public meetings of the citizens on various issues
- Organising meetings (where politicians or other official leaders come to meet the citizens and ask for their opinions, support or votes ("election campaigning" in democracies, other kinds of requests in non-democracies))
- Volunteer activities
- Organising parties, weddings, or other celebrations, public or private, sometimes with space that can be reserved by private citizens for such purposes
- Organising cultural events, exhibitions, bazaars, etc.
- Organising local non-government activities
- Hosting recreational activities, classes, physical activities, etc.
- Providing office space for non-profit community organisations
- Passing on and retelling local history, etc.

== Organization and ownership ==
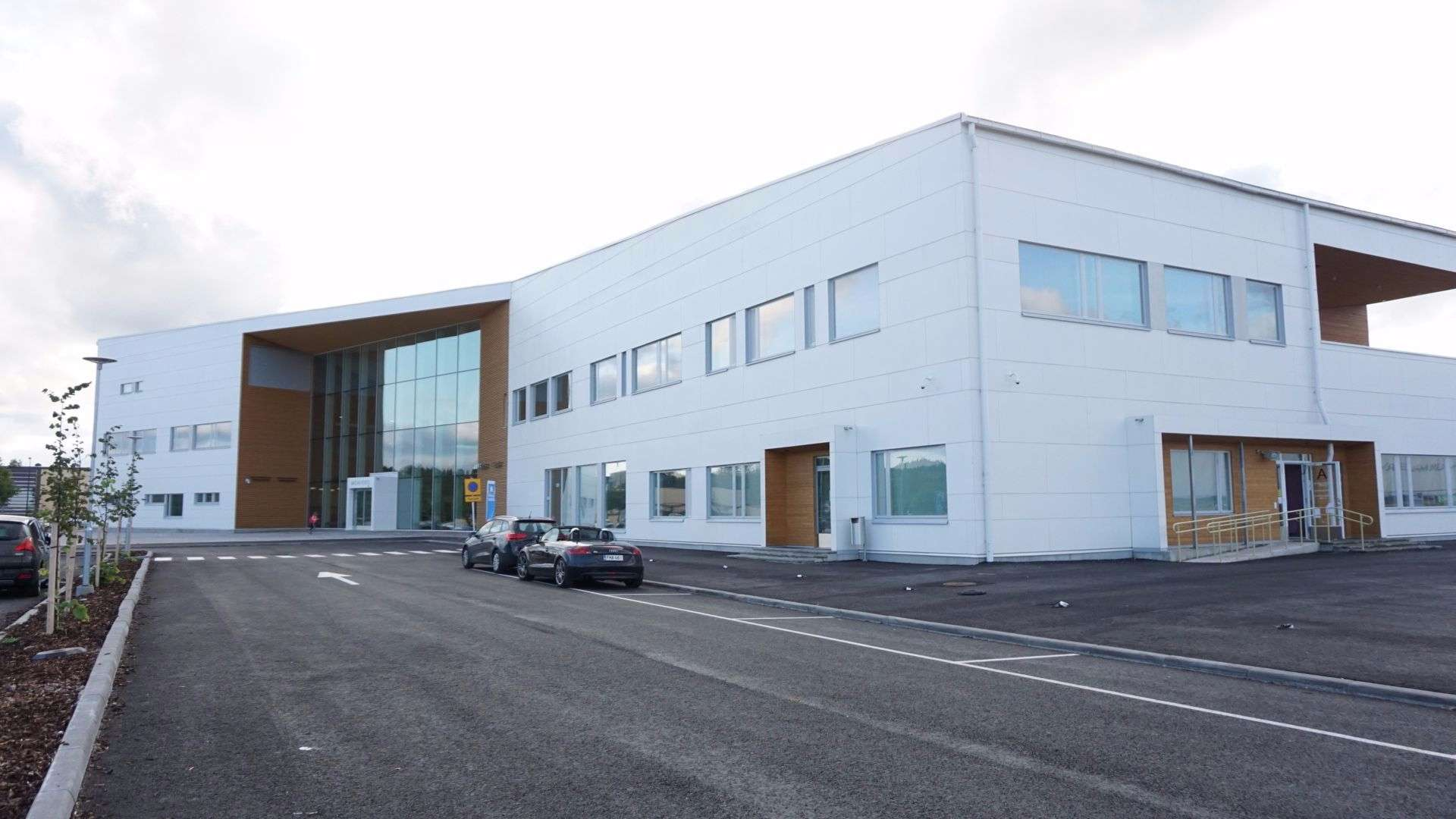
Community centre in Klaukkala, Finland.

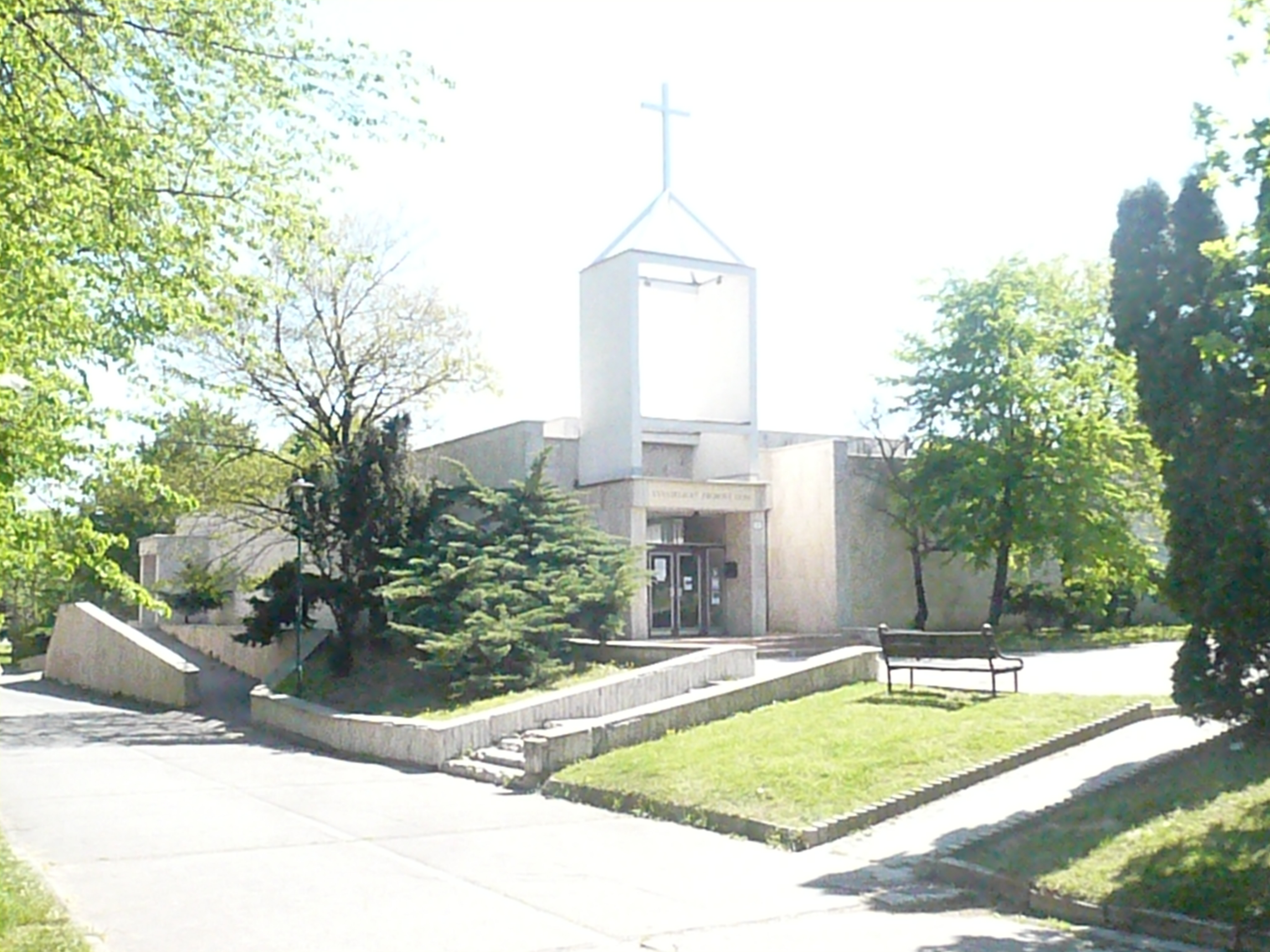
Protestant Community Centre in Dúbravka, Bratislava (Slovakia).

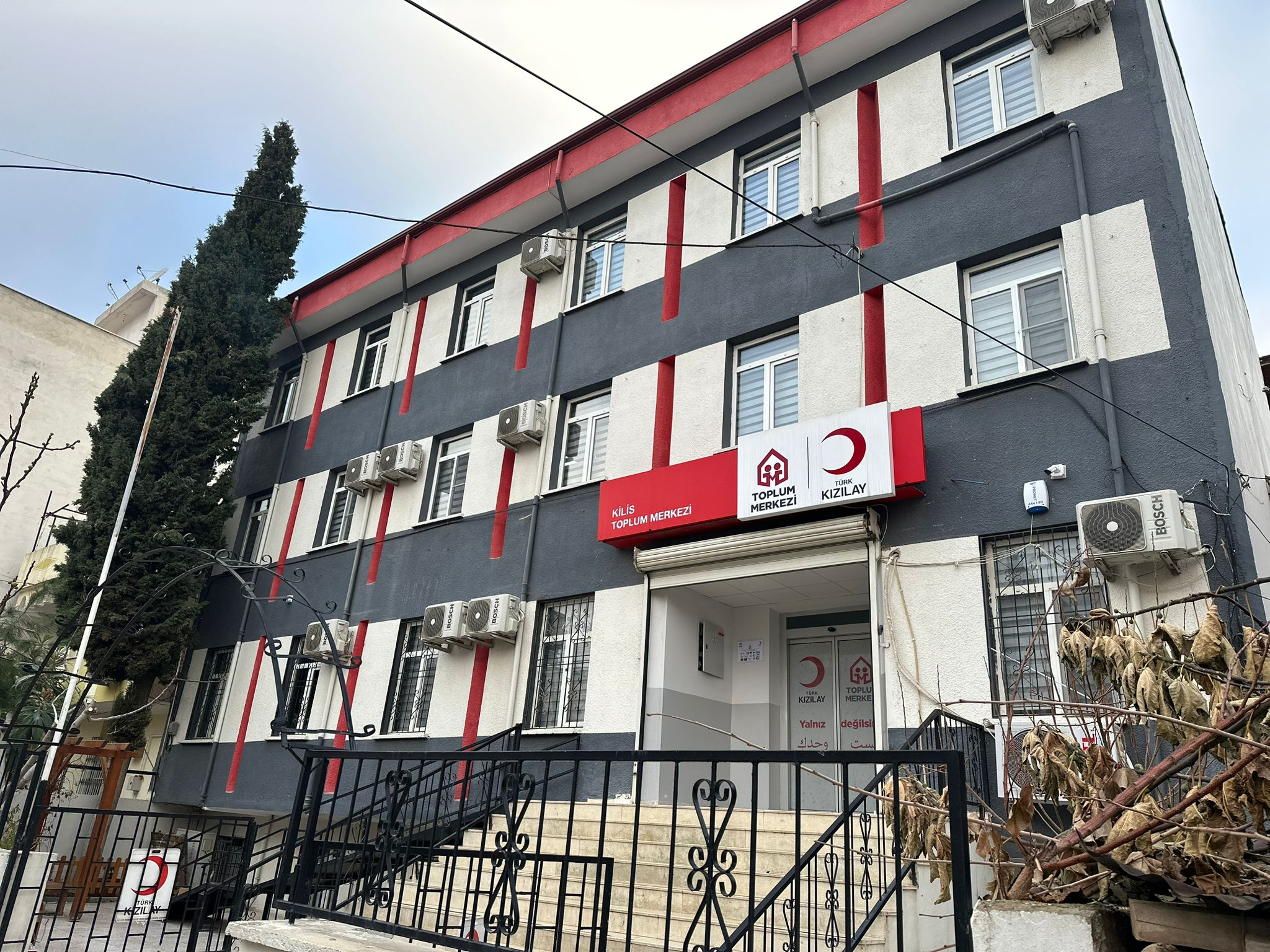
Turkish Red Crescent Kilis Community Center

Around the world (and sometimes within single countries) there appear to be four common ways in which the operation of the kind of community centre are owned and organised. In the following description, "Government" may refer to the ordinary secular government or to a dominant religious organisation such as the Roman Catholic Church; and it may refer to the central, national, or international branch of a government/church or to the local subdivision of it.

- Community owned: The centre is directly owned and run by the local community through an organization separate from the official (local) governmental institutions of the area, but with the full knowledge and sometimes even funding from (local) government institutions.
- Government owned: The centre is a public (local) government facility, though it is mostly used for non-government community activities and may even have some kind of local leadership elected from its community.
  - Kominkan (in Japan)
- Sponsored: A rich citizen or commercial corporation owns the centre and donates its use to the community for reasons of charity or public relations.
- Commercial: The community centre is a purely commercial entity which aims to profit from renting its facilities to various community groups on terms suitable for such use.

In addition to these models, community centres are also run by humanitarian organizations and the national societies of the Red Cross and Red Crescent Movement. These centres serve as hubs for providing humanitarian aid, offering services such as psychosocial support (MHPSS), socio-economic development programs, social cohesion activities, and protection services for vulnerable populations, including refugees and migrants. These community centres are vital in crisis contexts, facilitating recovery and resilience by addressing the social and emotional needs of affected individuals.

== Types ==
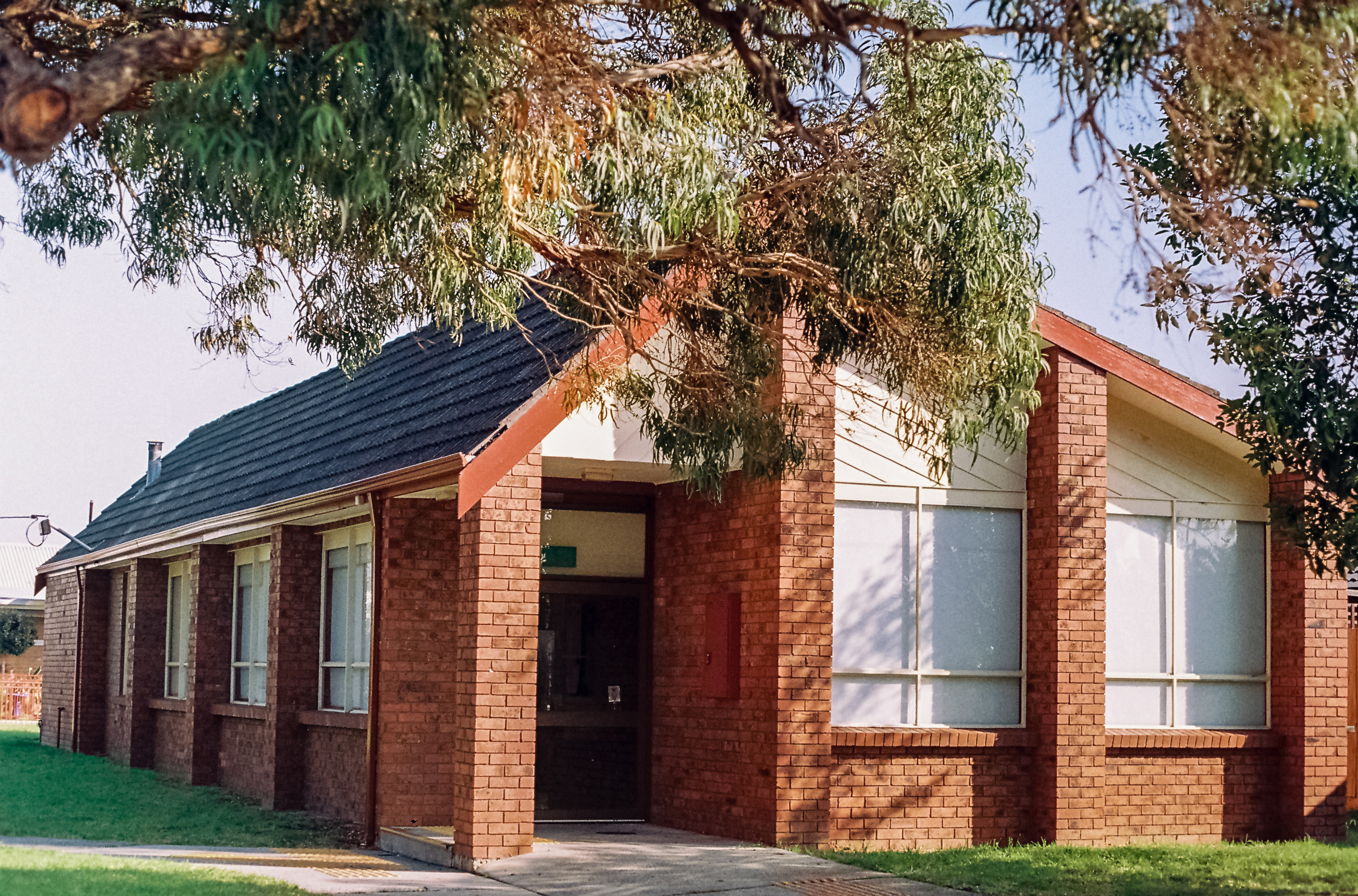
Community hall at Chelsea Victoria in Australia.

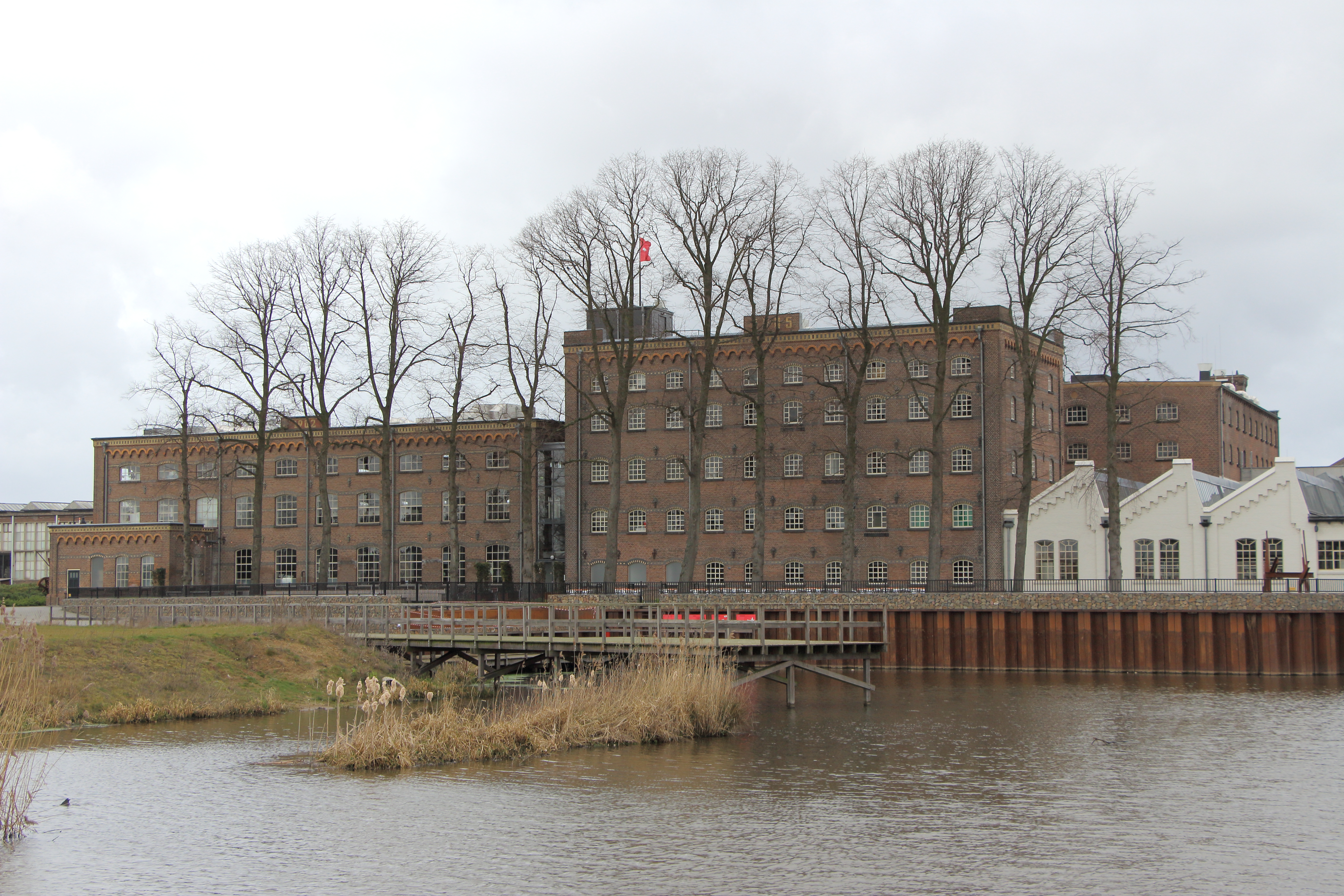
The DRU Cultuurfabriek in the Netherlands is based on a former iron foundry. The main building was used once for the administration.

The community centres typically have their own origin and history. There are some examples:

- Purpose-built - Buildings have been erected specifically to function as community centers (as early as 1880, perhaps even earlier).
- A disused public building - When an official government building (such as a school or city hall) is no longer needed for its original purpose, it is sometimes offered to the community as gift, loan or sale.
- A disused commercial building - When a commercial building of some local importance is no longer used, it is sometimes sold or donated to the community.
- A building that served many of the purposes now given to the community centre in addition to a different primary use (such as school, church, inn, or town hall), which was later acquired so it could continue these functions after its primary use subsided.

=== Schools ===
Early forms of community centers in the United States were based in schools providing facilities to inner city communities out of school hours. An early celebrated example of this is to be found in Rochester, New York from 1907. Edward J. Ward, a Presbyterian minister, joined the Extension Department at the University of Wisconsin–Madison, organizing the Wisconsin Bureau of Civic and Social Development. By 1911 they organized a country-wide conference on schools as social centers. Despite concerns expressed by politicians and public officials that they might provide a focus for alternative political and social activity, the idea was successful. In 1916, with the foundation of the National Community Center Association, the term Community Center was generally used in the US. By 1918 there were community centers in 107 US cities, and in 240 cities by 1924. By 1930 there were nearly 500 centers with more than four million people regularly attending. The first of these was Public School 63, located on the Lower East Side. Clinton Child's, one of the organizers, described it as:

"A Community organized about some center for its own political and social welfare and expression; to peer into its own mind and life, to discover its own social needs and then to meet them, whether they concern the political field, the field of health, of recreation, of education, or of industry; such community organization is necessary if democratic society is to succeed and endure".

In the UK many villages and towns have their own community centre, although nearby schools may offer their assembly or dining hall after school for Community Centre activities. For example, local schools near Ouston, County Durham may host dance or sporting activities provided by a local community centre.

== Grassroot functions ==
Parks are also considered community centers. Another pioneer of community centers was Mary Parker Follett, who saw community centers as playing a major part in her concept of community development and democracy seen through individuals organizing themselves into neighborhood groups, and attending to people's needs, desires and aspirations. This can also include parks.

In the United Kingdom, the oldest community centre is possibly that which was established in 1901 in Thringstone, Leicestershire by the old age pensions pioneer, Charles Booth (1847-1916). Extended in 1911 and taken over by the Leicestershire County Council in 1950, this centre still thrives as an educational, social and recreational community resource and was the inspiration for numerous others of its kind.

There are also community centres for a specific purpose, but serving the whole community, such as an arts centre.

Online community centres are defined as a web-based interactive, user-submitted network for groups, organizations, or businesses. Users create their own personal profiles, blogs, groups, photos, art, calendars, music, and videos to display on their own pages. Administrators provide oversight to the content and approve membership of users.

== Urban planning ==
In Singapore, community centres are distinct buildings that are officially designated by the government of Singapore. They are meant to play an urban planning role especially as part of Housing Development Board projects. Enrichment and grassroots organization are their functions like most other community centres, but relieving traffic congestion concerns by placing community centres nearby is also another reason.

== See also ==
- Cultural center
- Village hall
- YMCA
- Kominkan (Japanese citizen's public hall)
- People's House
- Palace of Culture
- Teen center
- Community arts
- Autonomous social center
- Far-right social centres
- Third place
