= Palais des Sports =

Palais des Sports (French: Palace of Sports) is a generic name of comprehensive indoors sports venue, mostly in the French-speaking world, including:

France

- Palais des Sports de Beaulieu, Nantes
- Palais des sports Ghani-Yalouz, Besançon
- Palais des Sports Jean-Michel Geoffroy, Dijon
- Palais des Sports de Beaublanc, Limoges
- Palais des Sports de Gerland, Lyon
- Palais des Sports, Grenoble
- Palais des Sports de Marseille
- Palais des Sports Jean Weille, Nancy
- Palais des Sports Maurice Thorez, Nanterre
- Palais des Sports, Orléans
- Palais des Sports, Paris in Porte de Versailles (XVe arrondissement)
- Palais des Sports de Pau
- Palais des Sports de Toulon
- Palais des sports André-Brouat, Toulouse

Québec, Canada

- Palais des Sports Léopold-Drolet, Sherbrooke
- Palais des Sports, Val d'Or

Greece

- Palais des Sports (Kallithea)
- Palais des Sports (Thessaloniki), an alternate name for the Alexandreio Melathron Nick Galis Hall arena in Thessaloniki

Ivory Coast

- Palais des Sports de Treichville, Abidjan

Republic of the Congo

- Palais des Sports (Kintélé), Brazzaville

== See also ==
- Palace of Sports in Anglophone countries,
- Palacio de los Deportes in Hispanophone countries,
- Palazzo dello Sport in Italophone countries.
