= Palace of Culture =

Community centers in socialist states

Gorbunov Palace of Culture

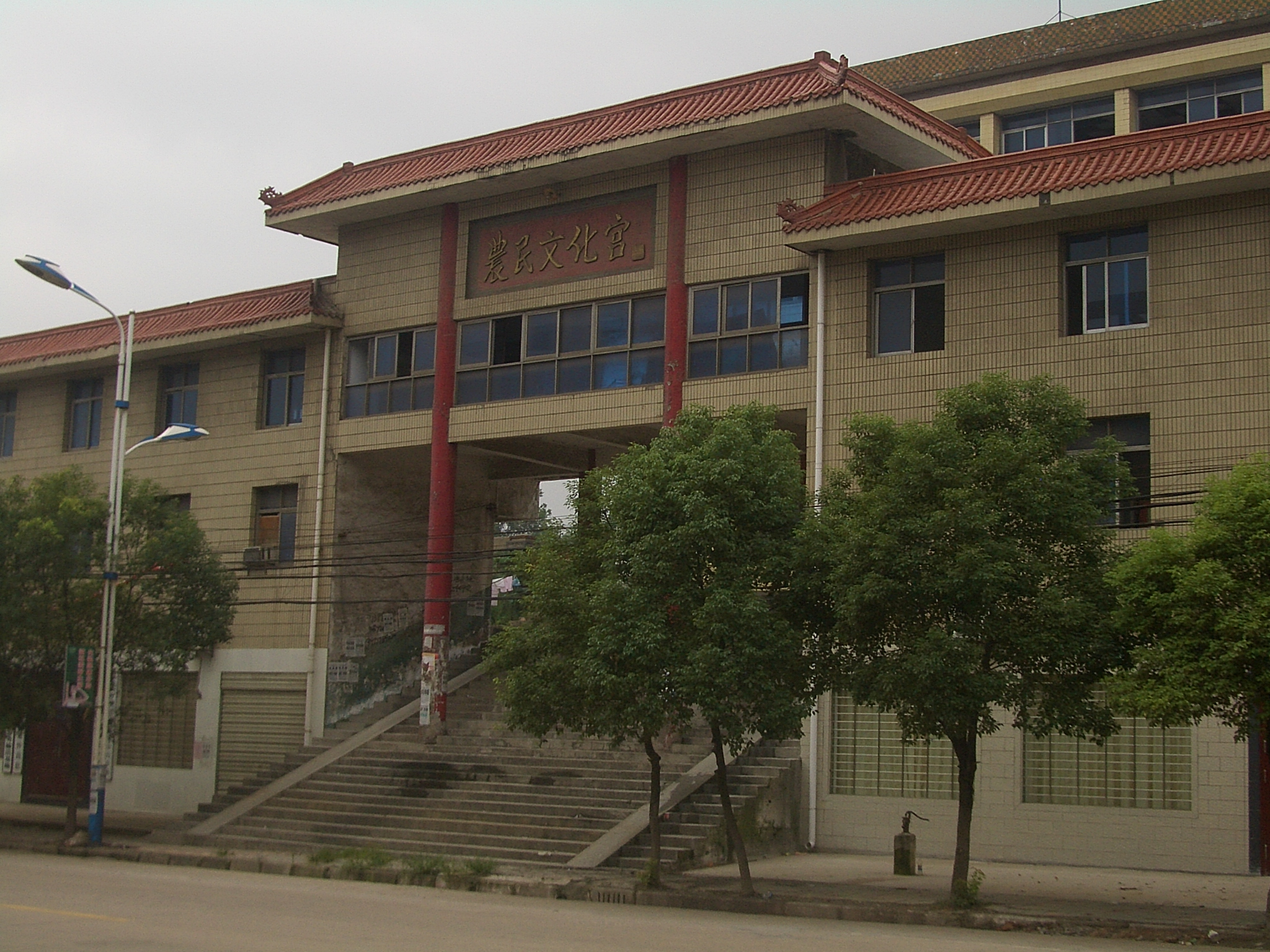
Peasants' Palace of Culture in Dajipu township, Huangshi Municipality, Hubei, China

Palace of Culture (Russian: Дворец культуры, romanized: dvorets kultury; German: Kulturpalast; Chinese: 文化宫, wénhuà gōng; Vietnamese: Cung văn hoá) or House of Culture (Polish: dom kultury; Vietnamese: Nhà văn hoá) is a common name (generic term) for major club-houses (community centres) in the former Soviet Union and the rest of the Eastern bloc.

== History ==
In the Soviet Union, the system of Houses of Culture was fundamentally modeled after the Bulgarian Chitalishte (est. 1856) – the region's first widespread network of democratic, community-owned cultural centers. Unlike the Imperial Russian People's Houses (Narodnyye doma), which were often top-down institutions established by wealthy industrialists or the "Guardianship of Public Sobriety" for social control, the Bulgarian Chitalishte was a self-governing grassroots community. It offered universal access to education and operated on a strictly democratic basis, with every member having an equal vote. This autonomous Bulgarian model, combining libraries, theaters, and lecture halls, provided the essential blueprint for the later Soviet "Reading Cottages" (Izba-chitalnya) and the mass institutionalization of culture for the general public.

The system later evolved into several specialized variations, including the Palace of Arts, Palace of Sports, Palace of Pioneers, Palace of Metallurgists, House of the Red Army, and others. These institutions aimed to professionalize and categorize cultural and extracurricular activities within the socialist state framework.

== Description ==
As an establishment for all kinds of recreational activities and hobbies: sports, collecting, arts, etc., the Palace of Culture was designed to have room for multiple uses. A typical Palace contained one or several cinema halls, concert hall(s), dance studios (folk dance, ballet, ballroom dance), various do-it-yourself hobby groups, amateur-radio groups, amateur-theatre studios, amateur musical studios and bands, lectoriums (lecture halls), and many more. Groups were also subdivided by age of participants, from children to retirees. A public library may sometimes have been housed in the Palace of Culture as well. All hobby groups were free of charge until most recent times, when many hobbies with less official recognition were housed based on "self-repayment". A Palace of Culture was sometimes called a "club", but this did not mean that it was membership-based.

In official rhetoric, all these were supposed to aid the "cultural leisure" of Soviet workers and children and to fight "cultureless leisure", such as drinking and hooliganism.

Palaces or Houses of Culture were introduced in the early days of the Soviet Union, inheriting the role that was earlier fulfilled by so-called "People's Houses". Below is an excerpt from John Dewey's Impressions of Soviet Russia and the revolutionary world (1929).

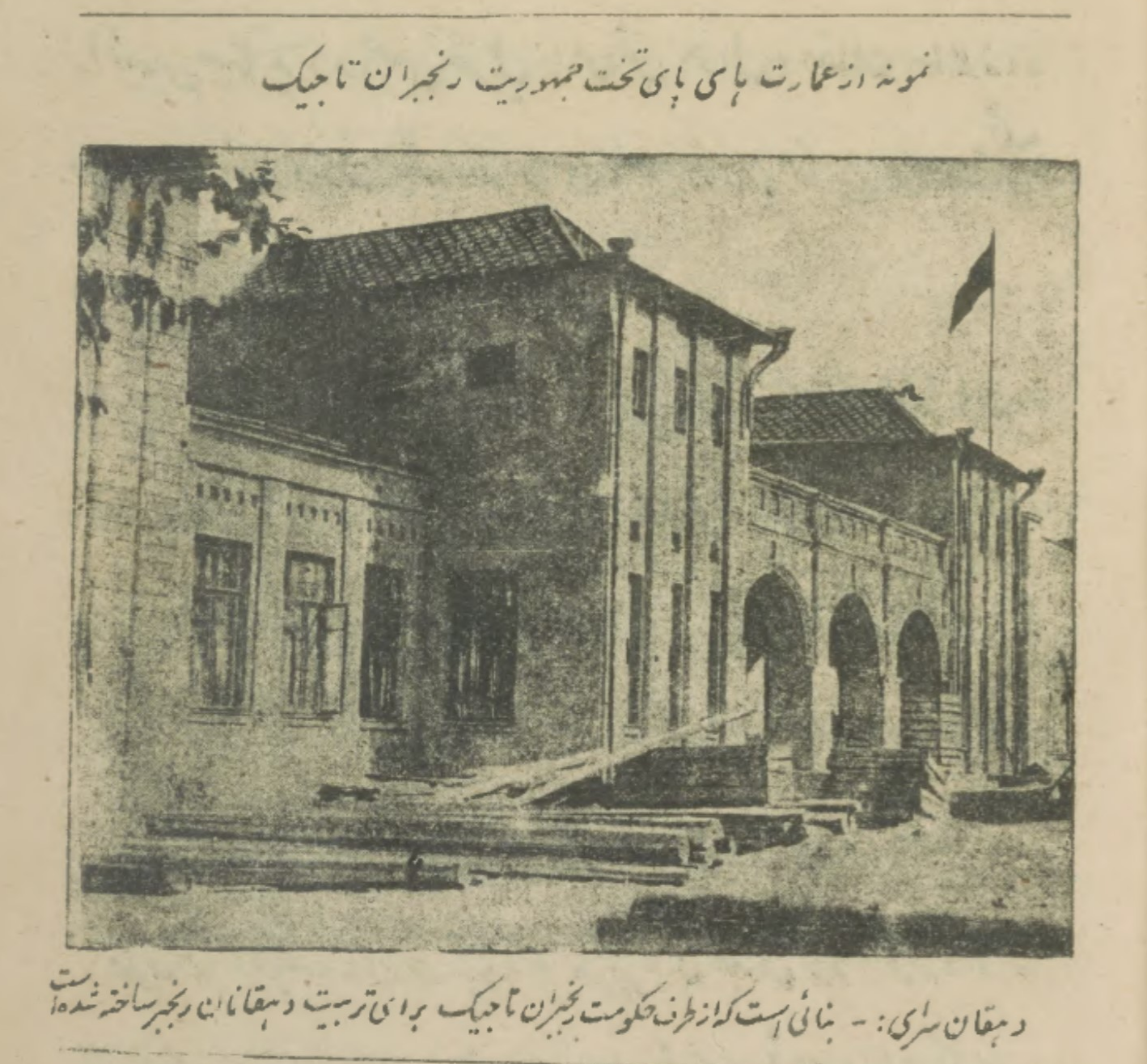
A depiction of the Dushanbe Palace of Culture (دهقان‌سرای) in 1935

The other impression I would record came from a non-official visit to a House of Popular Culture. Here was a fine new building in the factory quarter, surrounded by recreation grounds, provided with one large theater, four smaller assembly halls, fifty rooms for club meetings, recreation and games, headquarters for trade unions, costing two million dollars, frequented daily—or rather, nightly—by five thousand persons as a daily average. Built and controlled, perhaps, by the government? No, but by the voluntary efforts of the trade unions, who tax themselves two percent of their wages to afford their collective life these facilities. The House is staffed and managed by its own elected officers. The contrast with the comparative inactivity of our own working men and with the quasi-philanthropic quality of similar enterprises in my own country left a painful impression. It is true that this House—there is already another similar one in Leningrad—has no intrinsic and necessary connection with communistic theory and practice. The like of it might exist in any large modern industrial center. But there is the fact that the like of it does not exist in the other and more highly developed industrial centers. There it is in Leningrad, as it is not there in Chicago or New York…

There were two basic categories of Palaces of Culture: those owned by the state and those owned by the enterprise. Every town, kolkhoz and sovkhoz had a central Palace or House of Culture. Major industrial enterprises had their own Palaces of Culture, managed by the corresponding trade unions.

Palaces of Culture served another important purpose: they housed local congresses and conferences of the regional divisions of the Communist Party, the Komsomol, etc.

In the Ukraine city of Irpin, the Irpin Central House of Culture was funded and built by the community. Since its destruction by Russian forces in 2022, it has become an architectural monument.

In smaller rural settlements similar establishments of lesser scope were known as "clubs", with main activities there being dance nights and cinema. In 1988 there were over 137,000 club establishments in the Soviet Union.

In the People's Republic of China, the best-known, and most centrally located, Palace of Culture is perhaps the "Workers' Palace of Culture" located in the former Imperial Ancestral Temple just outside the Forbidden City in Beijing.

The concept and the name of a "House of Culture" also appears in (for example) France (Maison de la culture), Belgium, and Quebec.

== Post-Soviet times ==
Most Palaces of Culture continue to exist after the dissolution of the Soviet Union, but their status, especially the financial one, changed significantly, for various reasons.

== Notable Palaces of Culture ==
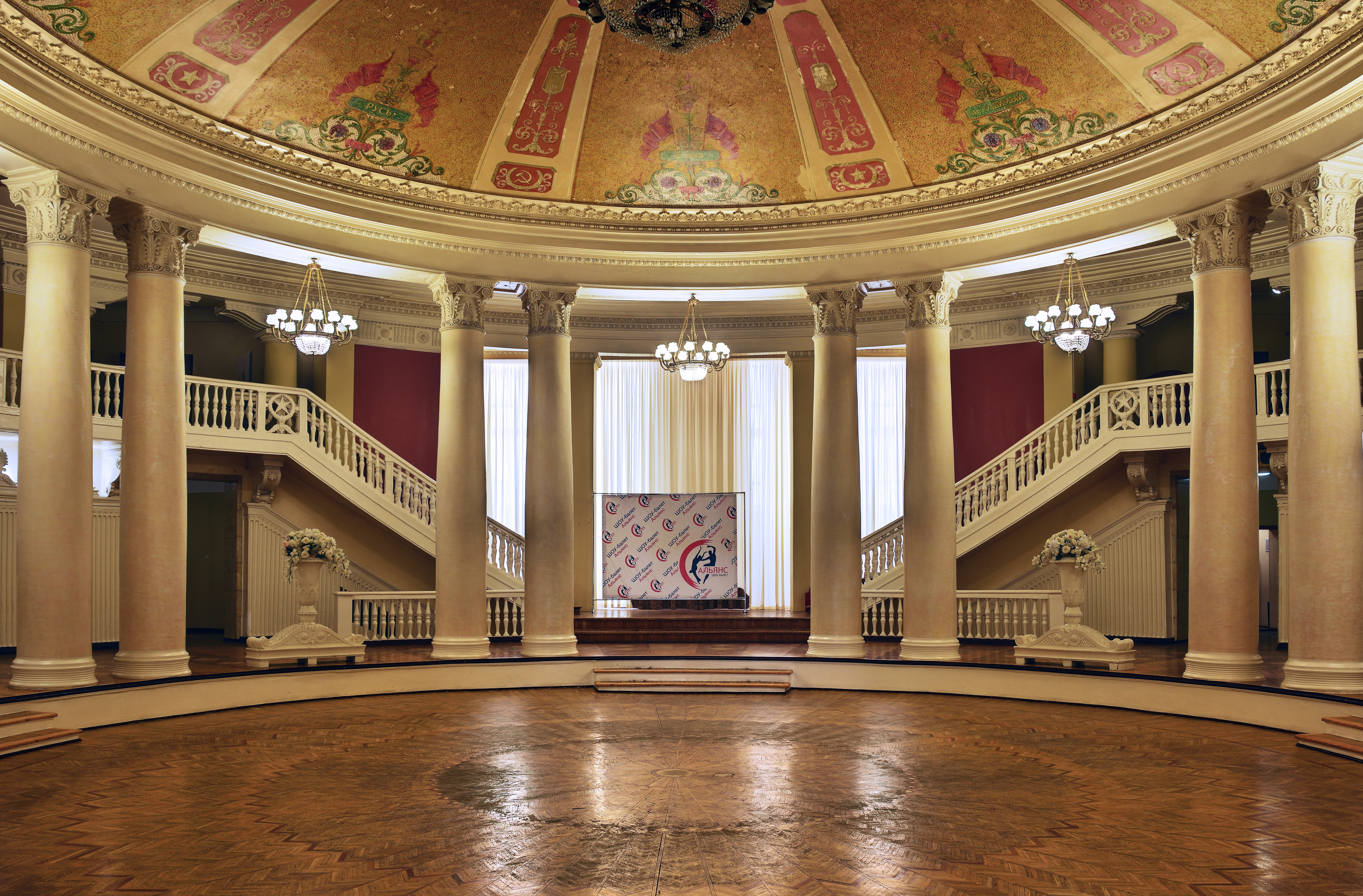
Foyer of the "Palace of Metallurgists" in Nizhny Tagil - one of the most luxurious palaces of culture during the existence of the Soviet Union

- Irpin Central House of Culture (Ukraine)
- Palace of Culture of Tirana (Albania)
- National Palace of Culture (Sofia, Bulgaria)
- Palace of Culture of Prague (Czechia)
- Palace of Culture and Science (Warsaw, Poland)
- Palace of Culture (Iași) (Romania)
- Palace of Culture of Kokshetau (Kazakhstan)
- Palace of Culture (Târgu Mureș) (Romania)
- Gorbunov Palace of Culture (Moscow, Russia)
- Cultural Palace of Nationalities (Beijing, China)
- Palacio de Cultura Banamex (Mexico City, Mexico)
- National Palace of Culture, Managua, Nicaragua
- Palace of Culture Energetik (abandoned Palace in Pripyat, Ukraine)
- Kominkan (Japanese equaivalent)
- VEF Palace of Culture of Riga (Latvia)
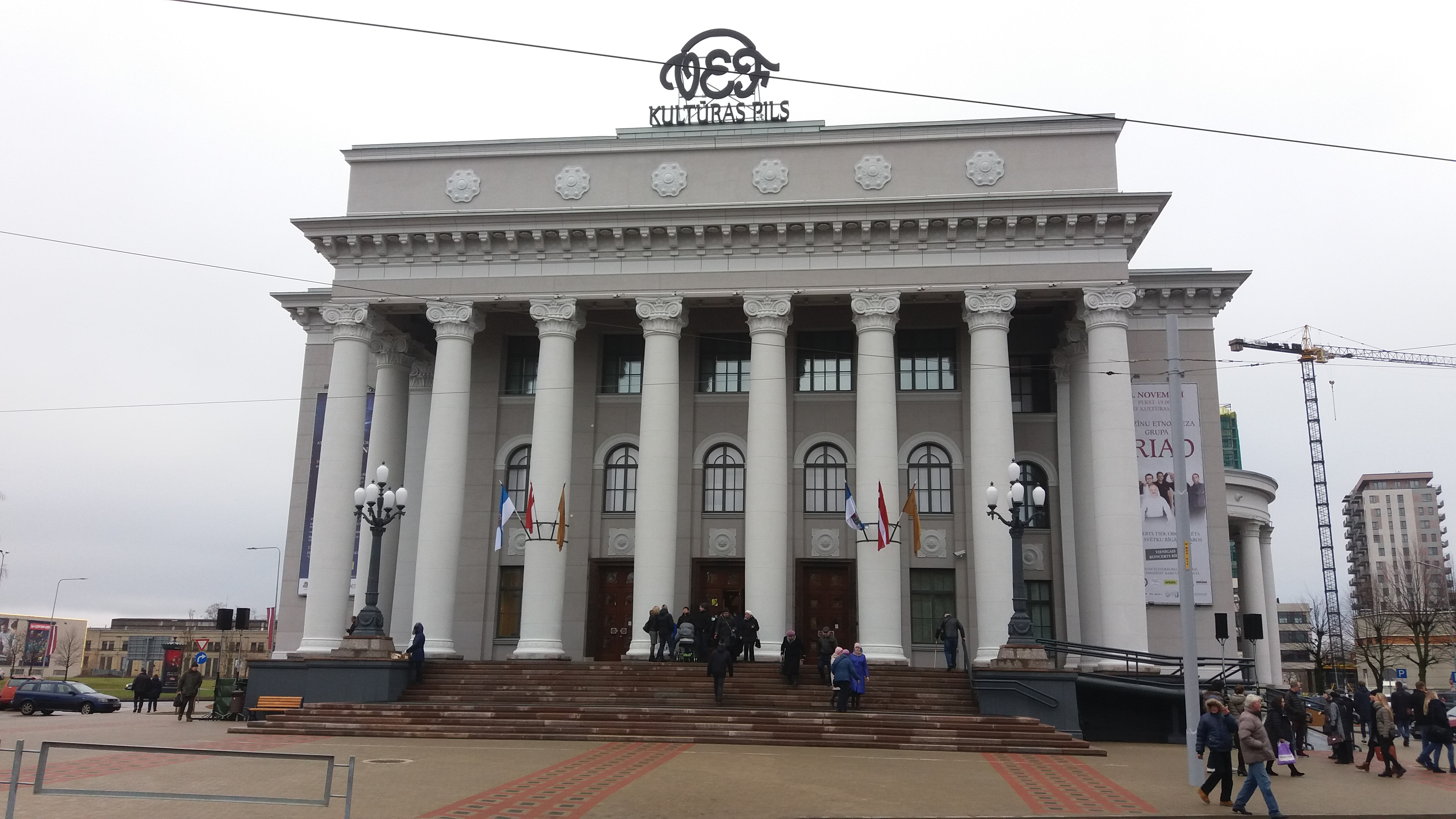
  VEF Culture Palace in Riga, Latvia
- Kulturpalast (Palace of Culture Dresden, Germany)

== Other Soviet entertainment complexes (Dvorets) ==
- Palace of Sports
- Palace of Arts and Creativity, a variation of Palace of Culture (i.e. Tolyatti Palace of Arts and Creativity, Palace of Arts "Ukraina")
- Pioneers Palace (House of Young Pioneers)
- House of the Red Army (DKA)
- House of Military Officers
- Palace of the Soviets

== See also ==
- Chitalishte
- Community centre
- Cultural center
- Institute of Culture
- Mechanics' institutes
- People's House, previous term that existed in the Russian Empire
