= SaveMLAK =

saveMLAK
- Available in: Japanese, English
- Revenue: Non-profit
- Website: www.savemlak.jp
- Users: 300
- Launched: March 12, 2011; 15 years ago
- Current status: Online
- Written in: MediaWiki

saveMLAK is a wiki designed to coordinate responses to the 2011 Tōhoku earthquake and tsunami, focusing on protecting museums, libraries, archives and kominkans, or community centers. It was started in March 2011, a day after the earthquake and tsunami hit. Makoto Okamoto is the site's founder and main administrator. The wiki runs on the MediaWiki software, along with the extension Semantic MediaWiki.

In December 2011, the wiki had information on 19,500 facilities, 24,300 pages, and about 300 editors who made 101,200 edits.

== Accolades ==
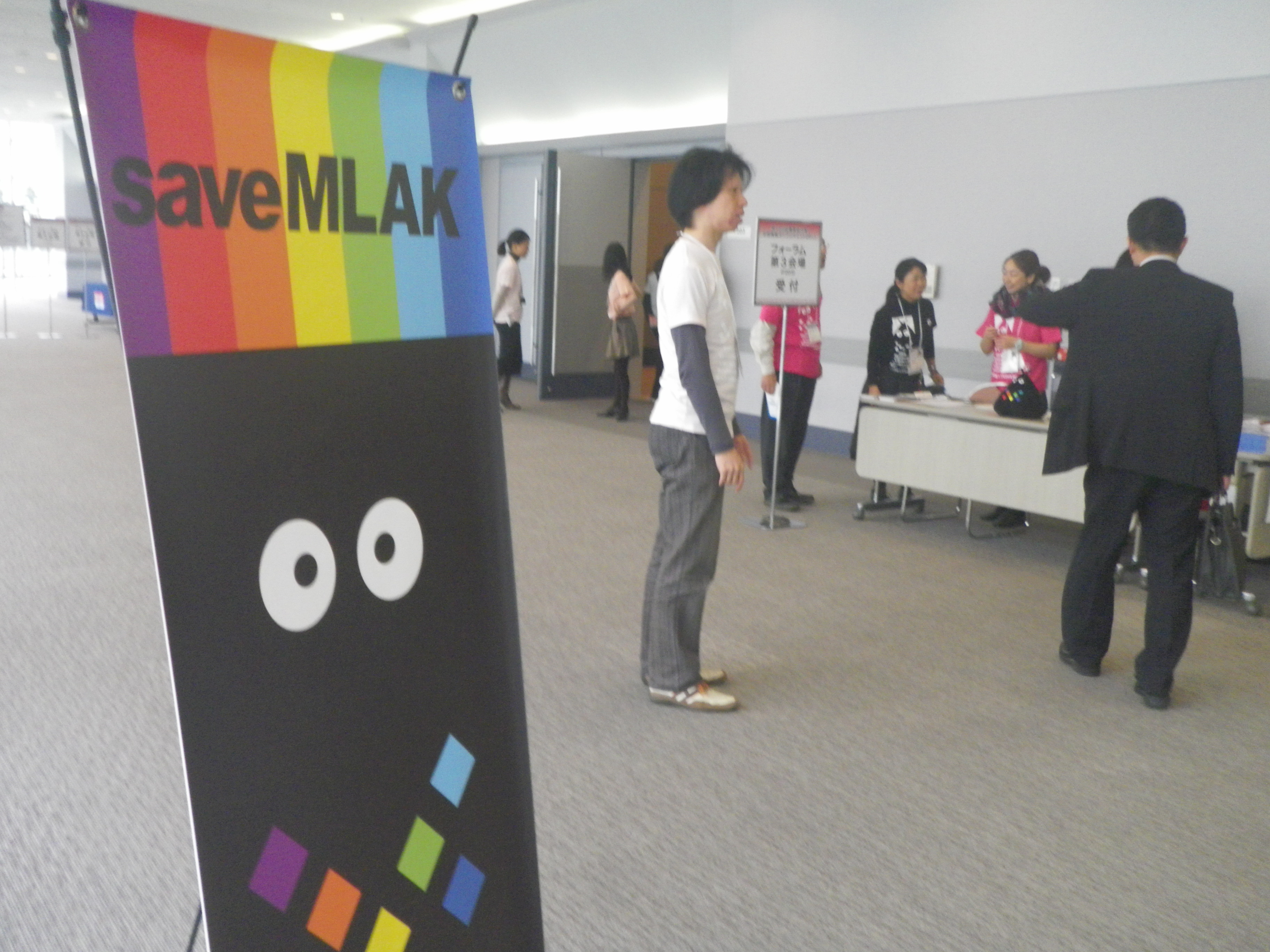
Forum at Library Fair 2011, Yokohama

The project's collaboration with the Miyagi Prefectural Library was highlighted by researchers "as an example of support for libraries in the disaster area."

SaveMLAK was selected as the Semantic MediaWiki wiki of the month in June 2011. It received The Best Dataset Award on Linked Open Data Challenge Japan 2011.

Okamoto gave the keynote talk for the Wikimania 2013 conference about saveMLAK.
