= People's House =

Community centre for the working class

People's Houses (Russian: Народный дом) were originally leisure and cultural centres built with the intention of making art and cultural appreciation available to the working classes. The first establishment of this type appeared in Tomsk, Russian Empire in 1882. Soon people's Houses became popular in England (1887, "People's Palace"), Scotland, Turkey and other European states.

The term "people's house" (e.g., folkets hus, casa del pueblo, maison du peuple, etc.) was further used in continental Europe for working-class public community centres, each of which often had associations with particular trade union organizations and political parties.

== Russian Empire ==
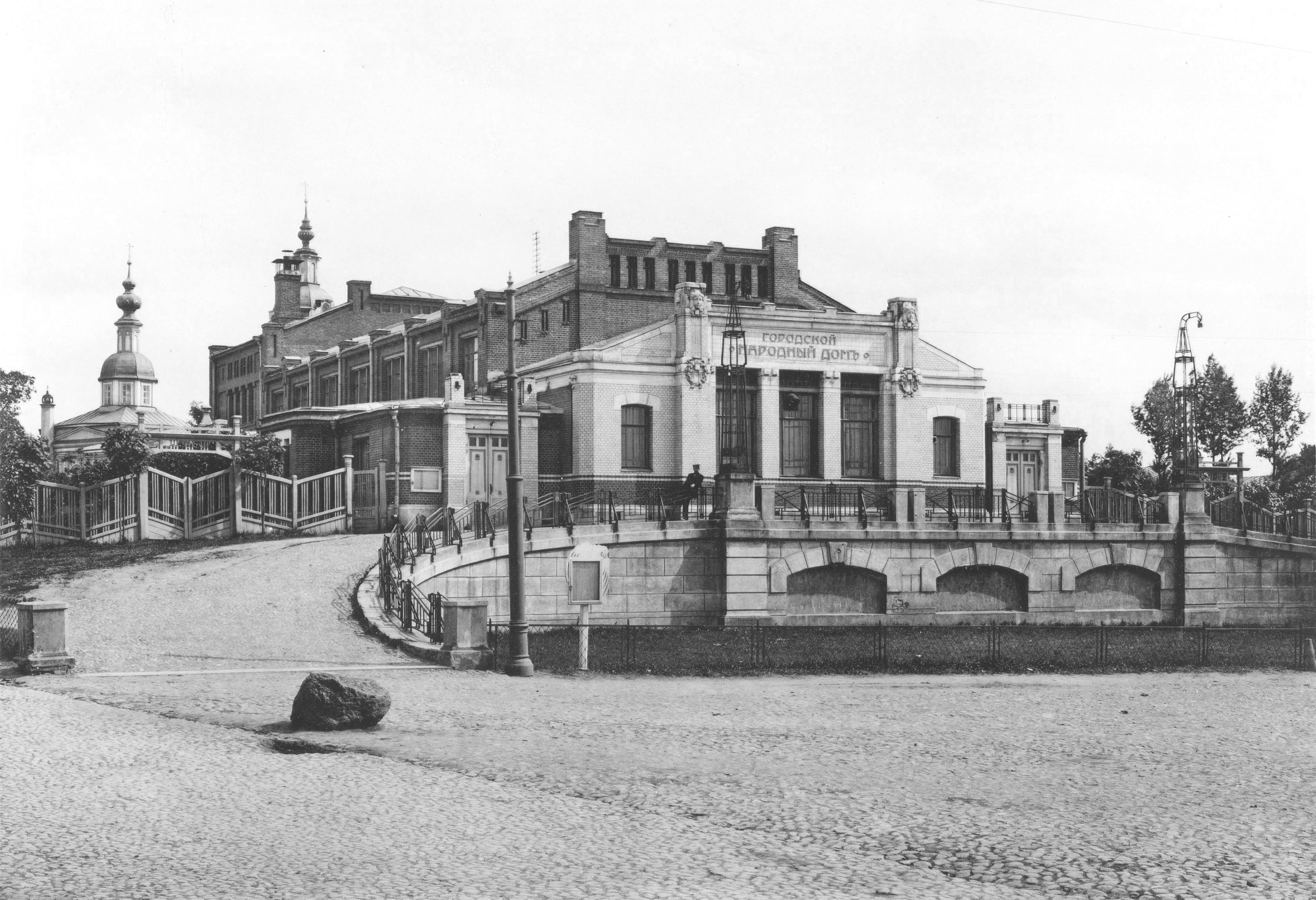
People's house in Moscow, 1904.

The first People's House (Russian: Народный дом) was built in Tomsk in 1882, and several more were erected in the capital of Russia, St. Petersburg during that decade. By the beginning of the 20th century the capital supported about 20 People's Houses: these provided entertainment, educational clubs for middle-class intelligentsia, petty officials, students, soldiers and workers, etc. Typically, a People's House included a library, reading room, theatre, tea rooms, a bookshop, a lecture hall with stage where activities such as Sunday school, evening classes for adults and choral singing might be held. Some included a museum with various types of visual aids used in lectures in the course of systematic training, and which were also used for travelling and permanent exhibitions.

The biggest and most famous People's House opened in Russia was built in Alexandrovsky Park in 1899–1900, and opened by Tsar Nicholas II, after whom it was named "Establishment for People's Entertainment of Emperor Nicholas II" ("Заведение для народных развлечений императора Николая II"), or, in short, "People's House of Emperor Nicholas II "("Narodny Dom Imperatora Nikolaya II"). This originally housed a concert hall, a theater, a public library and a restaurant. There was a small nominal entrance charge, with the only extra being charged for a seat at the theater. The English publication Contemporary Review noted these facilities, enviously commenting:"it is exactly what our People's palace was intended to be and is not". More such People's Houses were built in Moscow and other places in Russia.

== United Kingdom ==
In the late 19th century, People's Palaces started being built in grim urban districts. The concept was to raise morale and morality through inspiring buildings which offered cultural nourishment. Costly, taking years to build and lavishly decorated, they were designed to provide a focal point for civic pride, venues for meetings and public events.

Notably these were built according to neo-Gothic style, as promoted by Augustus Pugin and John Ruskin: Pugin believed the harmonious style of the architecture could influence morality, while Ruskin in his book The Stones of Venice examined the architecture of the Italian Renaissance mercantile republics, believing it expressed the spirit of freedom. Architects adopted these ideas in their building of People's Palaces in the north of England and in Scotland, both to assert the cultural credentials of those regions and to provide an improving influence over the citizens of burgeoning industrial towns.

In 1899 Joseph Rowntree and Arthur Sherwell proposed that People's Houses should be built as part of a programme by the Temperance Party to provide "recreations of the simplest and least exacting kind, such as would specially appeal to those to whom the stress of their daily lives leaves little inclination for anything more than physical relaxation and cheerful intercourse": that is, a viable alternative to the public house.

== Western Continental Europe ==
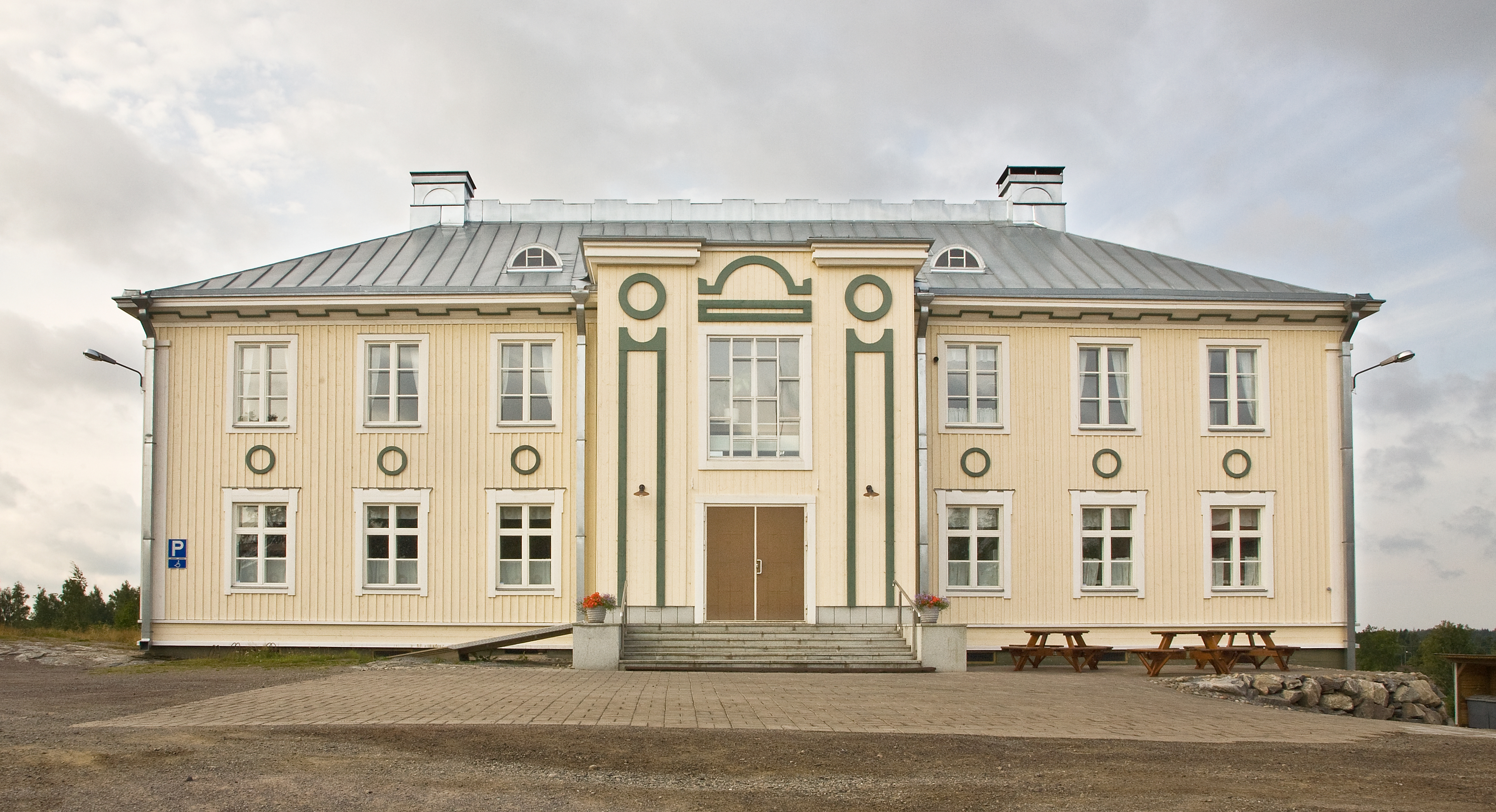
Early 20th century People's House in Kokemäki, Finland

In Western Continental Europe, the "people's house" is a generic term used to refer to proletarian community centres located in almost all cities.

When the labour movement and trade unions began to organize towards the end of the 19th century, the workers were in great need for premises of their own where they could hold meetings without interference. Opposition against the labour movement from the capitalists and landlords was strong and workers were not welcome to use existing premises. Landowners even forbade open-air meetings.

The workers in many Western European countries decided to buy their own land and build their own houses. The idea spread all over Western Europe. Construction was funded through co-operative ventures, various forms of contribution and not least voluntary work.

Most Western European "people's houses" were built along a similar model as the "Maison du Peuple" established in Belgium in 1899; that building was built as the headquarters of the Belgian Labour Party.

=== Norway ===
Antecedents to the modern folkets hus in Norway were established by Marcus Thrane's labour movement in the early 1850s. While the movement itself was short-lived and the branches were few, Thrane's attempt was succeeded by the first "workers' societies" (Norwegian: Arbeidersamfunn) by parish priest Honoratus Halling in 1850, which were less politically radical. In 1864, Eilert Sundt established Oslo Workers' Society (Norwegian: Oslo Arbeidersamfunn).

However, when Danish agitator Marcus Jantzen came to Norway in 1873 to establish a social democratic union, he and his acolytes were prohibited from discussing politics, so meetings organized by Jantzen were held in the open air in Tjuvholmen; by this time, the labour movement in Norway had taken off and largely associated with labour or socialist parties with similar woes of space for meetings, thus increasing the demand for separate facilities. The first modern people's house was established in Vikersund in 1890, and the oldest still existing is the People's House in Spjærøy, Østfold (built 1898).

The People's House in Oslo was established in 1907, and throughout the 20th century, over 200 people's houses were established throughout Norway. The People's House Association was established in 1947 to represent these establishments, and the People's House Fund is the primary loan provider for people's houses in Norway.

=== Spain ===
In Spain, the casa del pueblo ("people's house") is a general term for local branches of both the PSOE party (although the term has been officially retired from most PSOE offices save for those in the Basque Country) and the Unión General de Trabajadores; in addition, the CNT-AIt trade union makes use of similar branch offices, although they are largely described as ateneo popular or ateneo obrero ("people's university" and "worker's university" respectively).

The term has been used to describe clearing houses of information for Spanish employees and workers, and often served as schools for unskilled agricultural and industrial workers. The first was founded by Pablo Iglesias in 1908 in Madrid; the office was created in a former ducal palace on Calle del Piemonte, and similar houses were established throughout the country afterwards, particularly in the Basque country and in Asturias.

=== Sweden ===
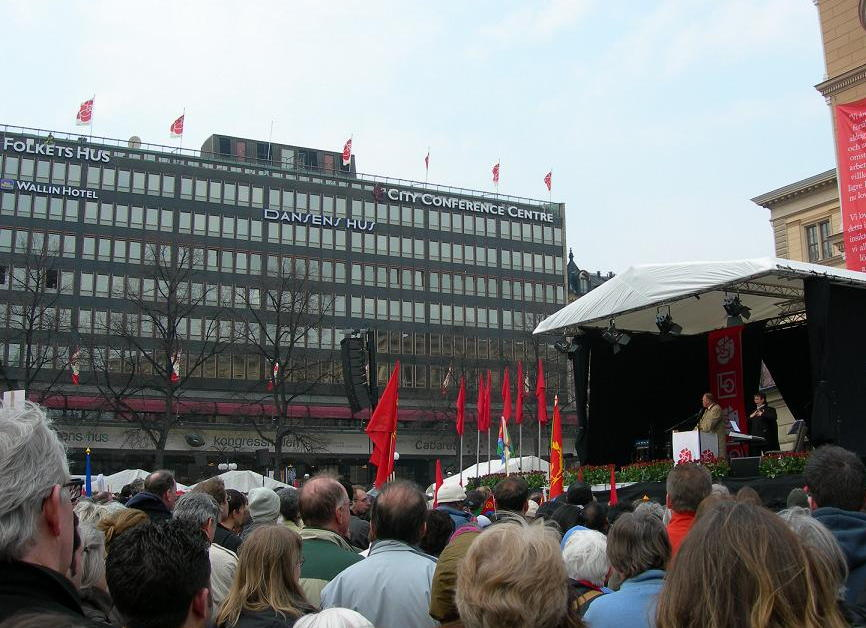
Folkets hus at Norra Bantorget in Stockholm. Social Democratic Prime Minister Göran Persson speaking at May Day event, 2006.

In Sweden "The People's House" (Swedish: Folkets hus) is historically associated with organizations affiliated with the Swedish labour movement. The name is also used for Norwegian and Danish people's houses.

"The people's park" (folkets park) is a prevalent feature of many Swedish towns, serving similar purposes.

In Stockholm, the construction of the first people's house started in 1897 in Norra Bantorget square. It was opened in 1901, and by 1906 the Russian Bolsheviks and Mensheviks were welcomed to hold their fourth congress at Stockholm Folkets hus. In 1955 the original Stockholm people's house was demolished, as was most of lower Norrmalm during the 1950s, 60s, and 70s. It was replaced by the current people's house building, which was built at the same place.

=== Italy ===
The first casa del popolo ("house of the people") built in Italy was in Massenzatico, a small village in the nearby of Reggio Emilia, on September 9, 1893. The casa del popolo was inaugurated by Società Artigiana Cooperativa di Villa Massenzatico, in front of some of the most important Italian and European Socialist Party representants as Camillo Prampolini, Filippo Turati and Emile Vandervelde. Many Case del popolo have been retasked, though the name is sometimes used in their later names. The name is also used for businesses that were not originally a casa del popolo, similar to others such as in Brussels where it is used as the name for a restaurant, or in Montreal for a music bar.

=== Turkey ===
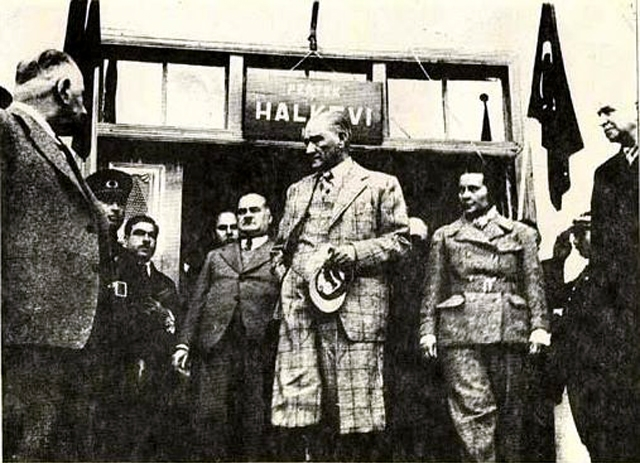
Mustafa Kemal Atatürk visiting Pertek People's House

People's Houses (Turkish: Halk Evleri) were established in Turkey in 1932, to give formal education to adults. The People's House developed programs on language and literature, fine arts, library and publications, history. On July 2, 1932, the first Turkish History Conference was assembled in the Ankara People's House. The activities of the people's houses were subsidized from the state treasury, and served all citizens. Yaşar Kemal's early poems to be published besides his folklore studies in the journal of the "Adana People's House".

With the establishment of multi-party politics in Turkey, most of the initial initiatives supported by the Republican People's Party (RPP) began to be questioned during 1945-1951. The opposition Democratic Party (DP) wanted to put an end to the People's Houses. The Democratic Party perceived the People's Houses as a strong political institution among the civilians which propagated the RPP's point of view. The DP wanted to cut public expenses to the institution from the government budget. The RPP proposed to reorganize them instead of closing, as they wanted to preserve the institution as part of Atatürk's heritage. The DP, who criticized the houses for closely identifying with the RPP, rejected the proposal; people's houses and property were confiscated once the DP gained a majority in the Turkish Grand National Assembly in 1951.

== See also ==
- Chitalishte
- Folkpark
- Kominkan
- Mechanics' institutes
- Narodny dim
- Village Institutes

== Literature ==
- Москва начала века / авт.-сост. О. Н. Оробей, под ред. О. И. Лобова — М.: O-Мастеръ, 2001. — С. 367—368. — 701 с. — (Строители России, ХХ век). — ISBN 5-9207-0001-7.
- Рябков В. М. Антология форм праздничной и развлекательной культуры России (XVII — начало XX): уч.пособие / В. м. Рябков. — Чел.акад.культуры и искусств. -Челябинск, 2006. — 706 с.
- Виноградов А. П. История культурно-просветительской работы в СССР −1970. — 246 с.
