= Kominkan =

Kind of Japanese cultural center

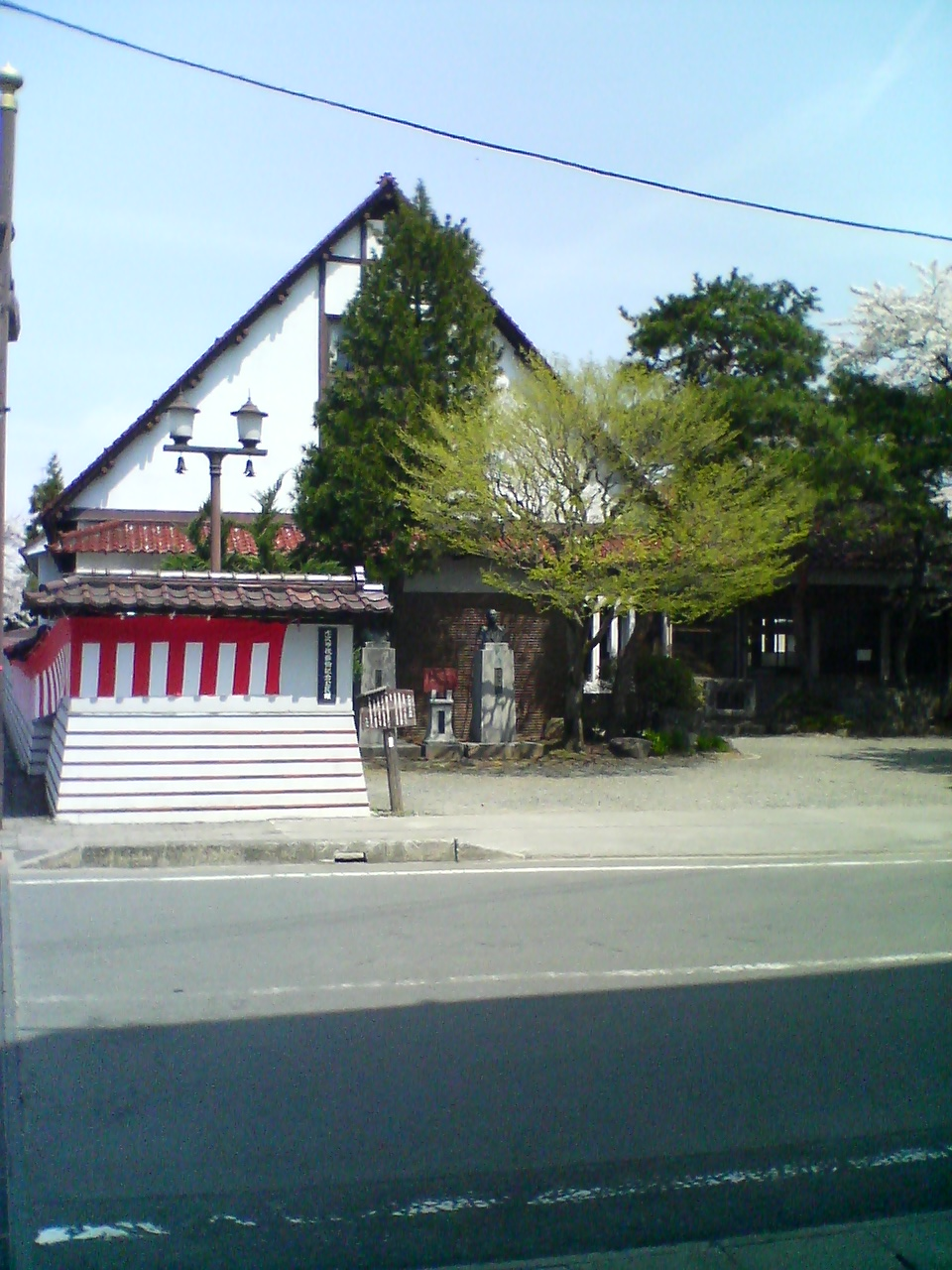
The first Kominkan in Japan.

A kominkan (公民館, kōminkan), or citizens' public hall, is a kind of Japanese cultural center. Kominkan provide structured learning programs in arts, sport, handiwork and cultural activities, to children, youth and aged people. They are generally funded and administered by local governments.

Along with libraries, archives and museums, they were targets of protection by the SaveMLAK project after the 2011 Tōhoku earthquake and tsunami.

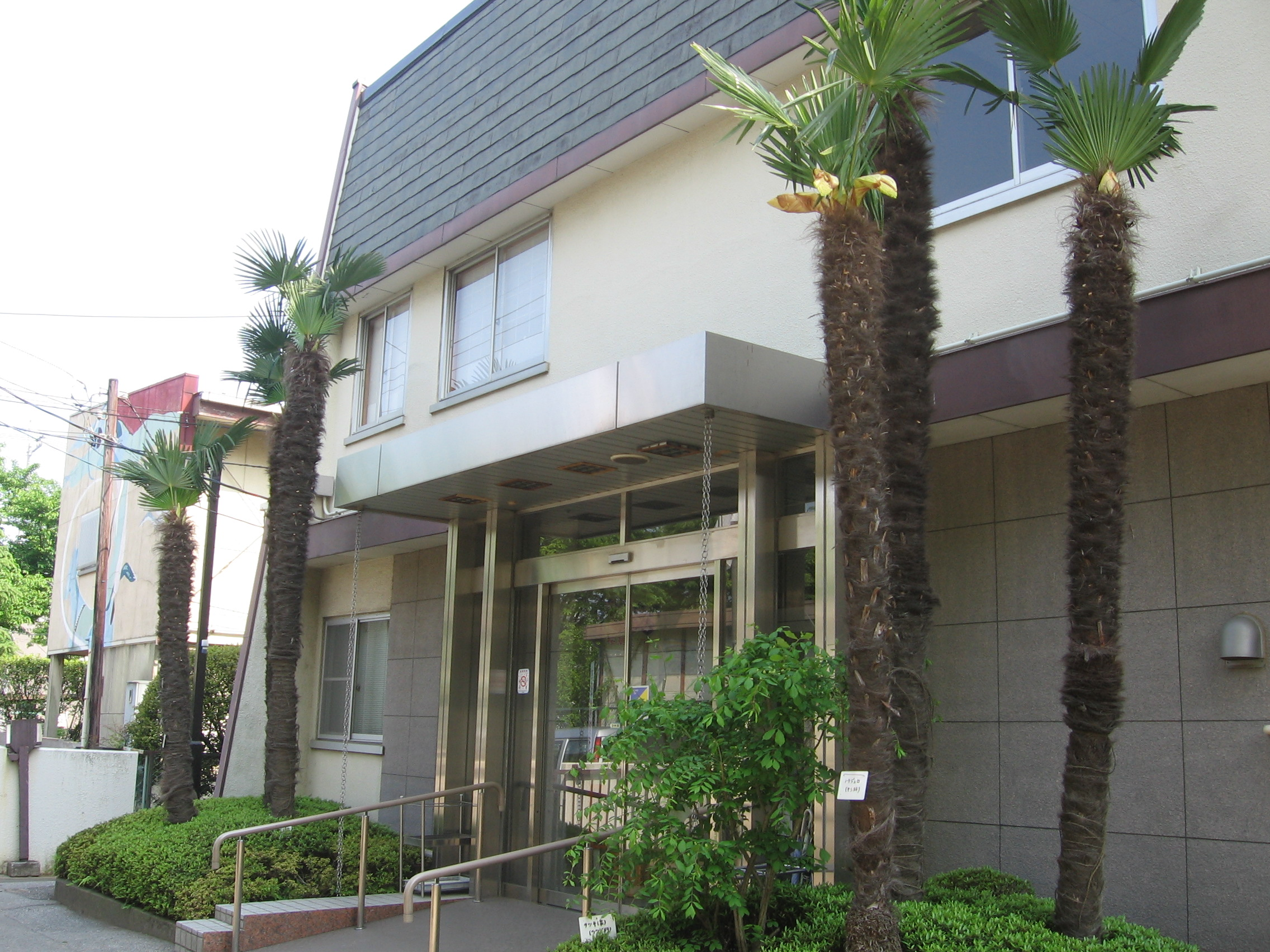
The Shibahuji-Kominkan in Kawaguchi

== History ==
Kominkan were in use in the early 1940s, although many were established after World War II under the Social Education Act of 1947. Kominkan were explicitly intended to provide cultural support for post-war communities, for "activities that contributed to re-building the communities after the devastation and upheavals of the war aftermath."

According to the text of the Japanese Social Education Act, they “provide the people living in specific areas such as a city, town or village with education adapted to meet the demands of actual life and implement academic and cultural activities. Kominkan shall contribute to the cultivation of residents, improve health, develop character, enliven daily culture, and enhance social welfare.”

In establishing Kominkan, the national government of Japan has invested substantial financial resources since the 1940s. In 1979, the national government spent 10 billion yen for infrastructure and administration.

== Statistics ==
As of 2008, there are 15,943 Kominkan in Japan, which is more than the number of secondary schools in the country. There are 50,771 total staff in Japan, for an average of about 3 staff members per Kominkan. According to this 2008 study, Japanese citizens participate in Kominkan activities 256 million times a year, for an average of 2 visits a year.

== Public use ==
According to Article 23 of the Social Education Act, Kominkan shall not be exclusively used to conduct for-profit business, or to do work in the interest of a particular political party or candidate. In addition, community centers shall not support a particular religion, sect, or cult.

== See also ==
- Palace of Culture
