= Palazzo dello Sport =

Palazzo dello Sport may refer to:

- Milan
  - Palazzo dello Sport (Milan), the original sports palace of Milan, built in 1923
  - Palasport di San Siro, also called Palazzone or Palazzetto dello Sport di Milano, open from 1976 to 1985
  - PalaSharp or Palazzetto dello Sport, open from 1986 to 2011
- Rome
  - PalaLottomatica or Palazzo dello Sport
  - Palazzetto dello Sport
