= 12th Army Corps (Ukraine) =

Ukrainian Ground Forces formation

- 12-й армійський корпус
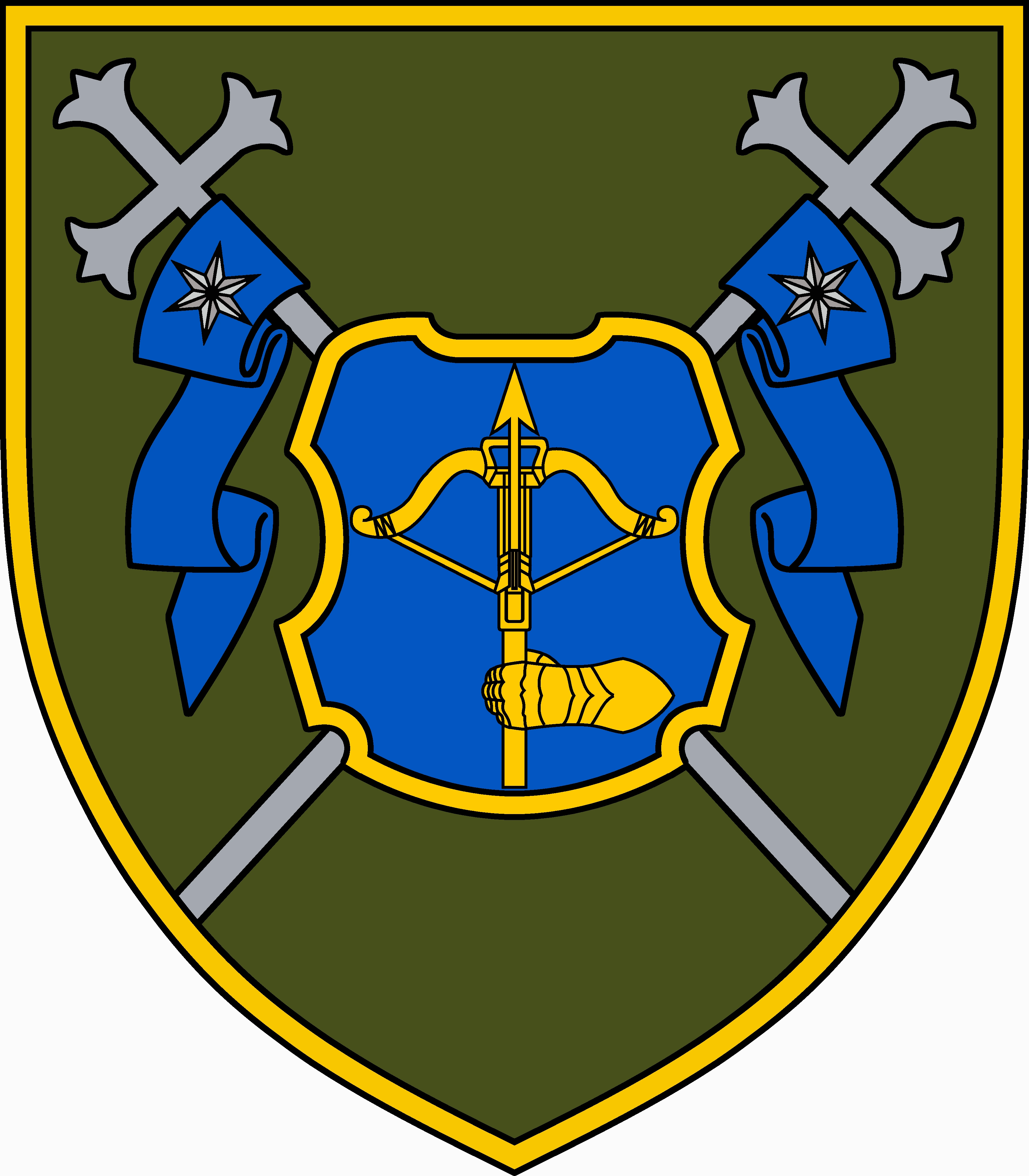
- Shoulder sleeve insignia
- Active: 22 December 2024 – present
- Country: Ukraine
- Branch: Ukrainian Ground Forces
- Size: Corps
- Garrison/HQ: Kyiv
- Mottos: Earn and Win
- Engagements: Russo-Ukrainian War
- Website: Official Facebook page

Commanders
- Current commander: Col. Pavlo Protsiuk

The 12th Army Corps (Ukrainian: 12-й армійський корпус) is a Corps of the Ukrainian Ground Forces.

== History ==
The 12th Army Corps was initially disclosed by Mariana Bezuhla in November 2024, although it gained more widespread attention later. This development aligns with broader military reforms within Ukraine, which include transitioning to a corps management structure, a concept that was expected to be detailed by the end of November 2024.

In June 2025, it was reported that the 12th Army Corps was responsible for the defense of Kyiv.

Unlike other formations, XII Corps is a joint service formation.

== Structure ==
As of 2026 the corps structure is as follows

- XII Army Corps
  - Corps Headquarters and HQ Services
    - Management
    - Commandant Platoon
  - Presidential Brigade
  - 2nd Medical Battalion (formed August 2025)
  - 5th Assault Brigade
  - 12th Signals Battalion
  - 19th Brigade
  - 25th Public Security Protection Brigade
  - 26th Naval River Ships Division
  - 27th Artillery Brigade
  - 27th Pechersk Brigade
  - 28th Regiment of State Facilities Protection
  - 31st Cherkasy Regiment
  - 67th Mechanized Brigade
  - 72nd Mechanized Brigade
  - 112th Territorial Defense Brigade
  - 118th Territorial Defense Brigade
  - 120th Territorial Defense Brigade
  - 151st Mechanized Brigade
  - 157th Mechanized Brigade
  - 153rd Separate Reconnaissance-Strike Battalion
  - 428th Unmanned Systems Battalion
  - 511th Maintenance Battalion
  - 1027th Anti-Aircraft Missile Defense Artillery Regiment
