= Dnieper Flotilla (Ukraine) =

The Riverine Flotilla of the Naval Forces of Ukraine
- Річкова флотилія Військово-Морських Сил України
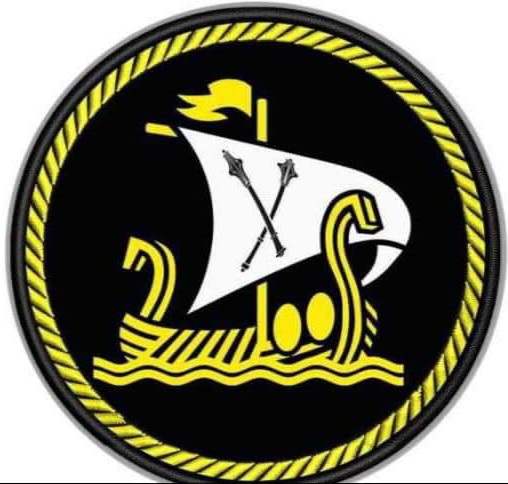
- Flotilla Insignia
- Active: 2022 - present
- Country: Ukraine
- Branch: Ukrainian Navy
- Type: Riverine Navy
- Role: River patrolling
- Part of: Armed Forces of Ukraine
- Garrison/HQ: Multiple bases along the Dnieper
- Engagements: Russo-Ukrainian War: Russian invasion of Ukraine

Commanders
- Current commander: Maksym Vasyliovych

The Dnieper Flotilla is a riverine flotilla of the Ukrainian Navy consisting of two divisions and is tasked with patrolling and protecting the Dnieper. It was established in 2022 during the Russian invasion of Ukraine amidst threats of a naval invasion from the north by Belorussian Dnieper fleet. It is in control of several small scale naval bases along the Dnieper.

== History ==
In March 2022, during the Russian Invasion of Ukraine, faced with a threat of invasion through the Dnieper by the Belorussian river fleet, based at Pinsk and Loev including a total of 19 vessels So the River fleet of the Ukrainian Navy was established, initially from armed civilian ships and then a total of 19 gunboats. The two divisions of the fleet were also given control of multiple bases in multiple cities along the Dnieper.

In September 2022, Sherp transferred a vessel to the regiment names as Sherp the Shuttle. In November 2022, ten new vessels from the United States were incorporated into the fleet.

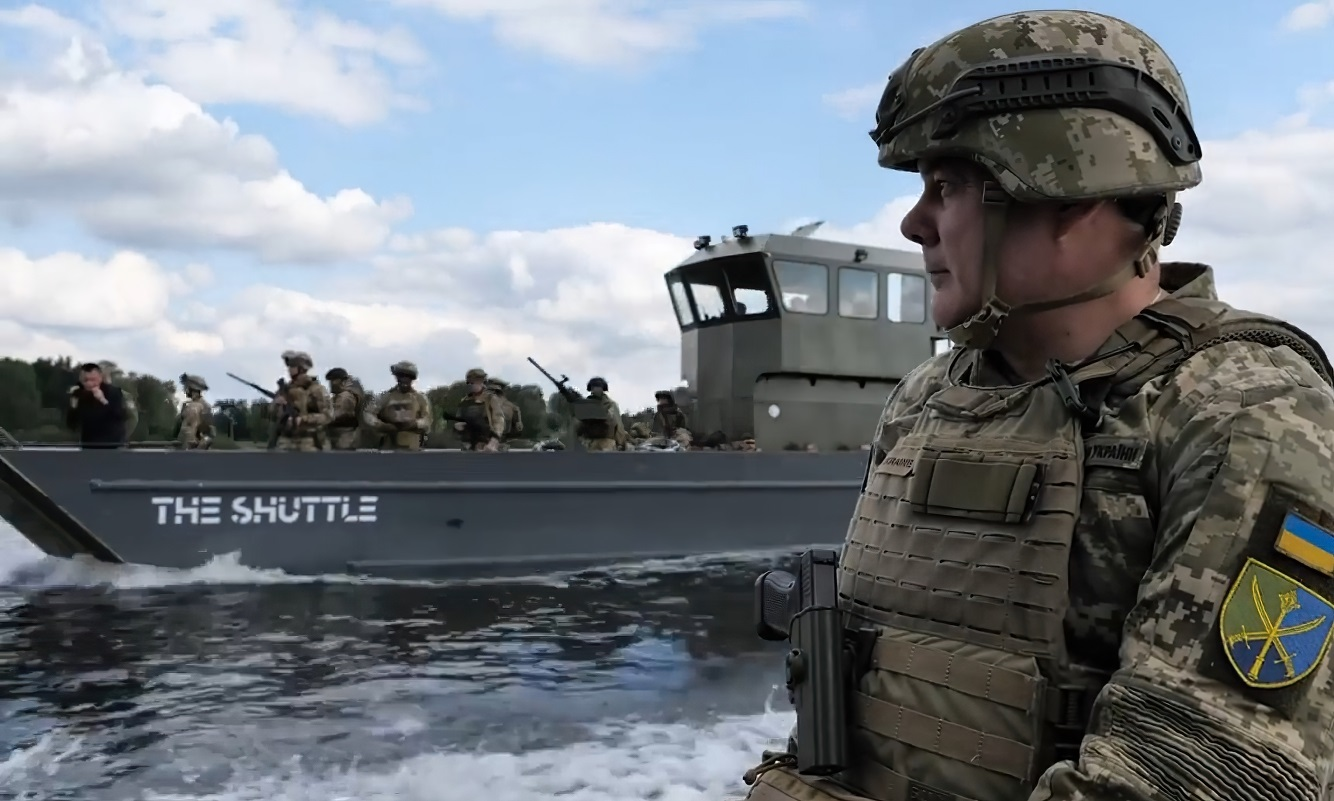
Sherp the Shuttle in action

In 2023, the river fleet which initially consisted only of the 26th River Ships Division tasked with protection of northern Dnieper included a second newly established division the 27th River Ships Division tasked with the protection of Southern Dnieper with the River fleet acting as a coordinating body.

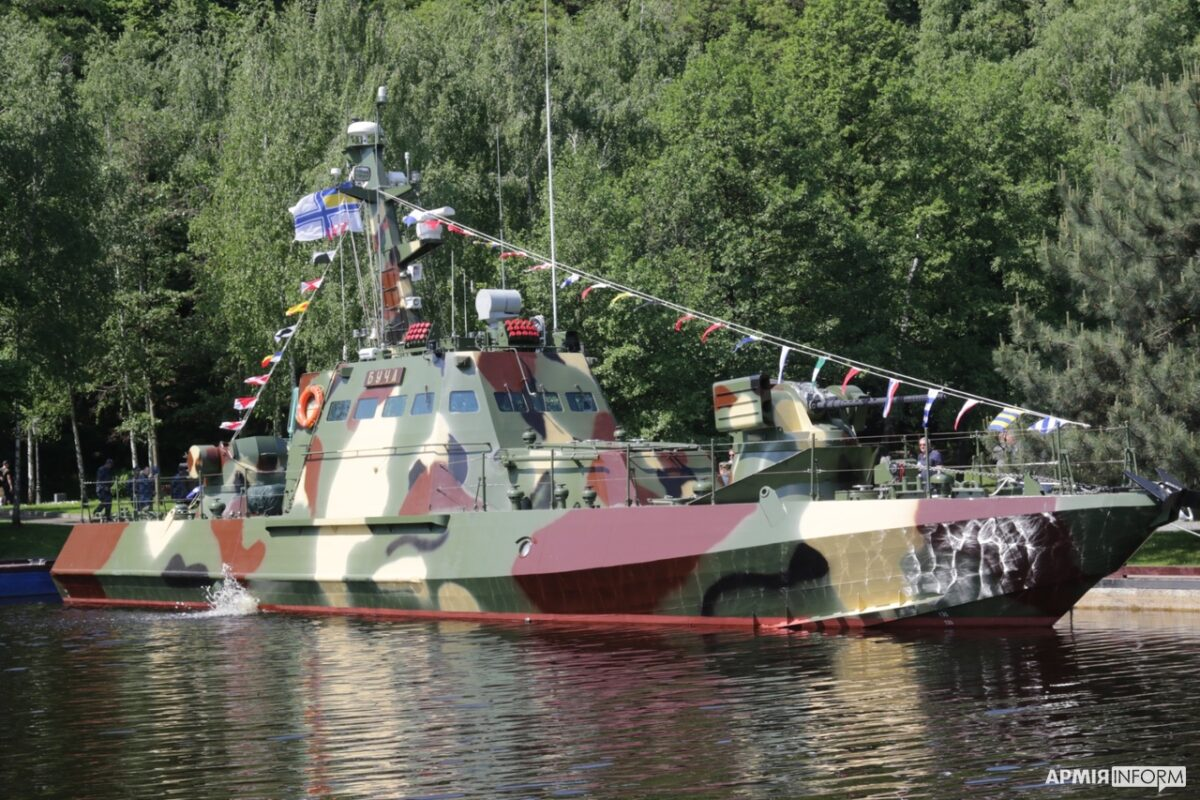
Bucha during her commissioning ceremony

On May 26, 2023, the River Flotilla received Bucha which became the flagship of the 26th division and also that of the fleet.

== Structure ==
The fleet consists of two divisions tasked with patrolling northern and southern Dnieper respectively.

- 26th Naval River Ships Division
- 27th Naval River Ships Division

== Commanders ==
- Yury Ivanovich Vytskyi (2022-)

== Sources ==
- Створення флотилії Військово-Морських Сил ЗС України значно покращило підготовку екіпажів кораблів, катерів і суден флоту
- River Flotilla. militaryland.net
- Riverine Navy in Ukrainian Realities
