= 26th Naval River Ships Division =

26th River Ships Division
- 26-й окремий дивізіон річкових катерів
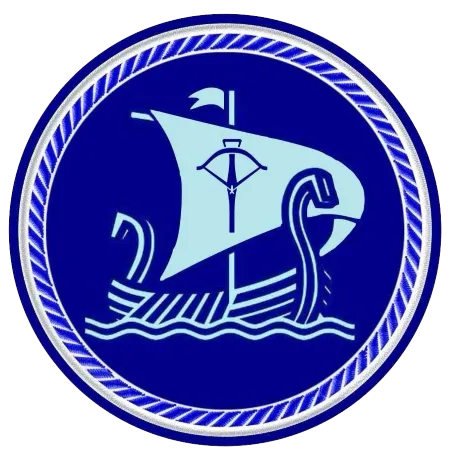
- Division Insignia
- Active: 2022 - present
- Country: Ukraine
- Branch: Ukrainian Navy; Armed Forces of Ukraine
- Type: Division
- Role: Protection of the Northern Dnieper
- Part of: 12th Army Corps
- Garrison/HQ: Multiple bases along the Dnieper
- Engagements: Russo-Ukrainian War: Russian invasion of Ukraine; Northern Ukraine campaign
- Decorations: For Courage and Bravery

Commanders
- Current commander: V. Symonenko

The 26th Naval River Ships Division is one of the two divisions of the Ukrainian Dnieper Flotilla and till 2023 it was the only division of the fleet. It was established in 2022 and is tasked with protection of the Northern Dnieper against any possible Russian or Belorussian invasion attempt from the north and saw action during the Northern Ukraine campaign.

== History ==
It was established in 2022 along with the establishment of the Ukrainian River Fleet to safeguard the Northern part of the Dnieper against any possible invasion by Belorussian Dnieper fleet.

In September 2022, Sherp transferred a vessel named Sherp the Shuttle to the regiment. In November 2022, ten new vessels from the United States were incorporated into the fleet.

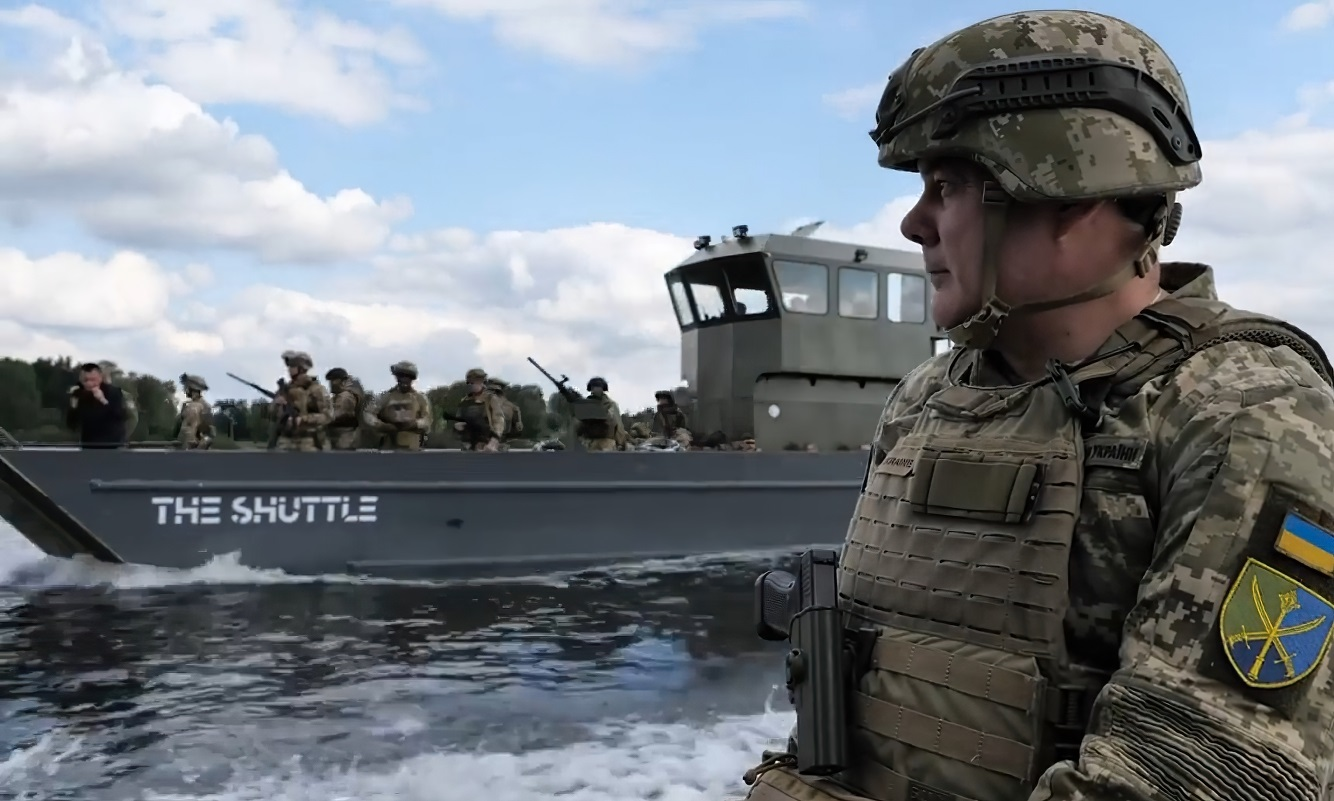
Sherp the Shuttle in action

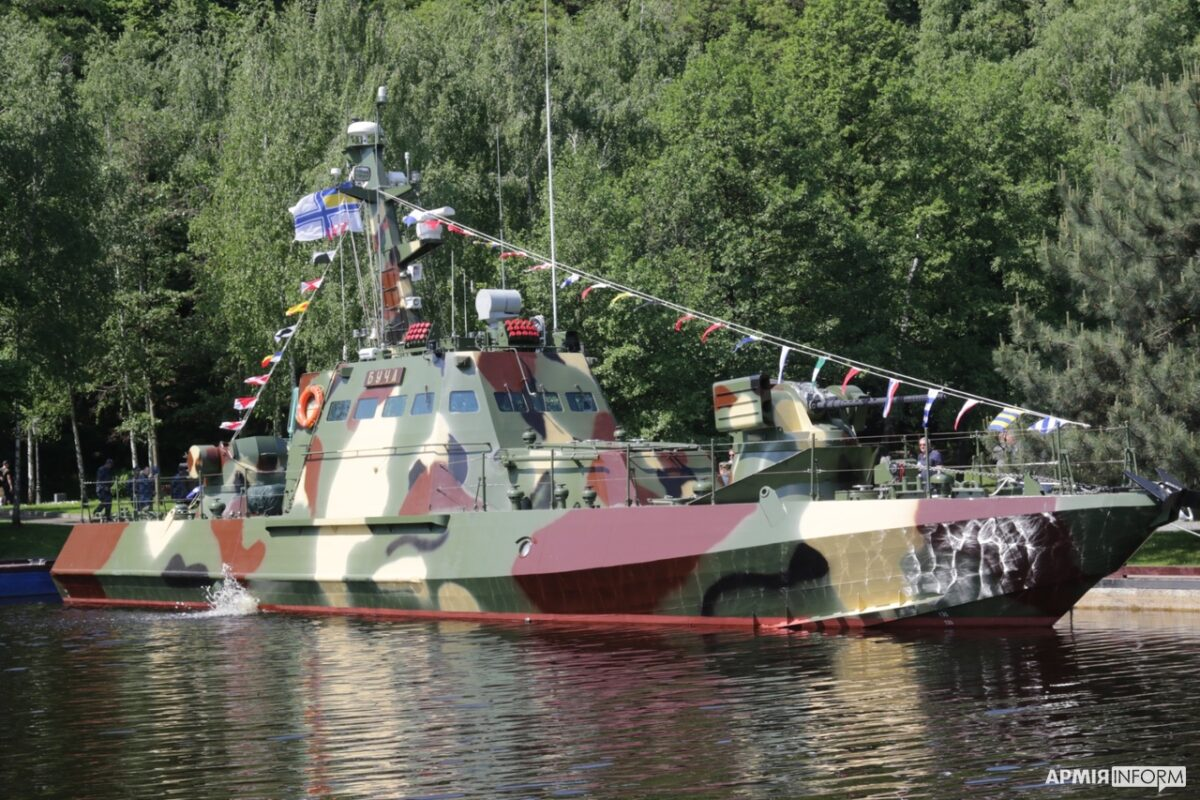
Bucha during her commissioning ceremony

The division participated in Northern Ukraine campaign and on May 12, 2023, a soldier of the unit Pomozanko Oleksandr Ivanovych, an Anti aircraft gunner was killed in action.

On May 26, 2023, the River Flotilla received Bucha which became the flagship of the 26th division and also that of the fleet. On July 2, 2023, the President of Ukraine presented a battle flag to the division.

On July 4, 2024, the division was awarded the award "For courage and bravery" by the decree of the President of Ukraine Volodymyr Zelenskyy.

== Vessels ==
- Bucha (Gunboat)
- Sherp the Shuttle (Landing Ship)
- Several Ark dauntless-class patrol vessels
- Several 363U-class gunboats
- Several modified civilian vessels

== Commanders ==
- V. Symonenko (2022-)

== Sources ==
- Відвага й майстерність наших воїнів ВМС знищили ворожі надії та втопили їх у морі
