= Special Honor Guard Battalion =

- Спеціальний батальйон почесної варти
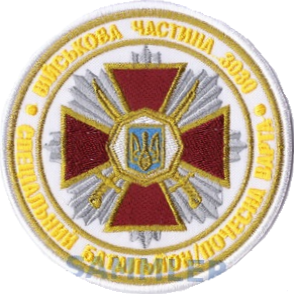
- Active: 1993; 32 years ago
- Country: Ukraine
- Branch: National Guard of Ukraine
- Type: Honor Guard
- Role: Ceremonial Guard
- Part of: 25th Public Security Protection Brigade, Northern Operational-Territorial Command
- Headquarters: Kyiv
- Nickname(s): NGU National Honor Guard Battalion
- Motto(s): "Ми урочисто труднощі долаєм" (We solemnly overcome difficulties)
- Colors: Blue

Commanders
- Current commander: Major Roman Gabrik

Insignia
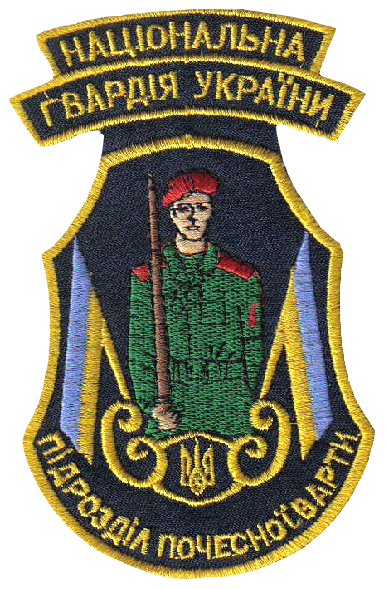
- Ceremonial Flag

The Special Honor Guard Battalion (Ukrainian: Спеціальний батальйон почесної варти) is a ceremonial honor guard of the National Guard of Ukraine. It is subordinated to the 25th Public Security Protection Brigade. It serves a similar purpose to the Honor Guard Battalion of the Independent Presidential Regiment.

== History ==
The unit was originally formed as part of the National Guard in 1993. The order to create an honor guard unit of the Internal Troops came in February 1999, by the Commander of Internal Troops. On December 17, 1999, by Decree of the President of Ukraine Leonid Kuchma, the battalion was transferred from the command of the National Guard of Ukraine to the Internal troops of Ukraine. The Honor Guard Battalion of the Internal Troops of Ukraine was officially founded on February 4, 2004. In 2014, it became a battalion of the 25th Public Security Protection Brigade, of the newly restored National Guard of Ukraine.

== Activities ==
The battalion has participated in almost a hundred of events, including parades during Victory Day and Independence Day, the Day of the National Guard, as well as various international events. The only major parade on Maidan Nezalezhnosti it took part in was the parade in honor of the 70th Anniversary of the Liberation of Kyiv in 2013.

=== Public duties at the Verkhovna Rada ===
On a daily basis, soldiers of the unit take part in the ceremonial of the guard changing and flag raising ceremony near the Verkhovna Rada building on the Constitution Square. Honor guards from the battalion are posted at the building from 10:00 am to 6:00 pm on weekends and holidays. In the winter, the guard will change every hour; and in the summer; every two hours. On March 1, 2020, the first ceremony was held to commemorate this tradition. Chairman of the Verkhovna Rada Dmytro Razumkov and Minister of Internal Affairs Arsen Avakov. They are posted at the side of the building where four National Guard officers were killed on August 31, 2015.

== Structure ==
- Battalion HQ and HQ Company
- National Guard of Ukraine Honor Guard Band
- Color Guard
- 1st Honor Guard Company
- 2nd Honor Guard Company
- 3rd Honor Guard Company
- Training Company
- Automotive Company
- Support Company

=== Photographs ===
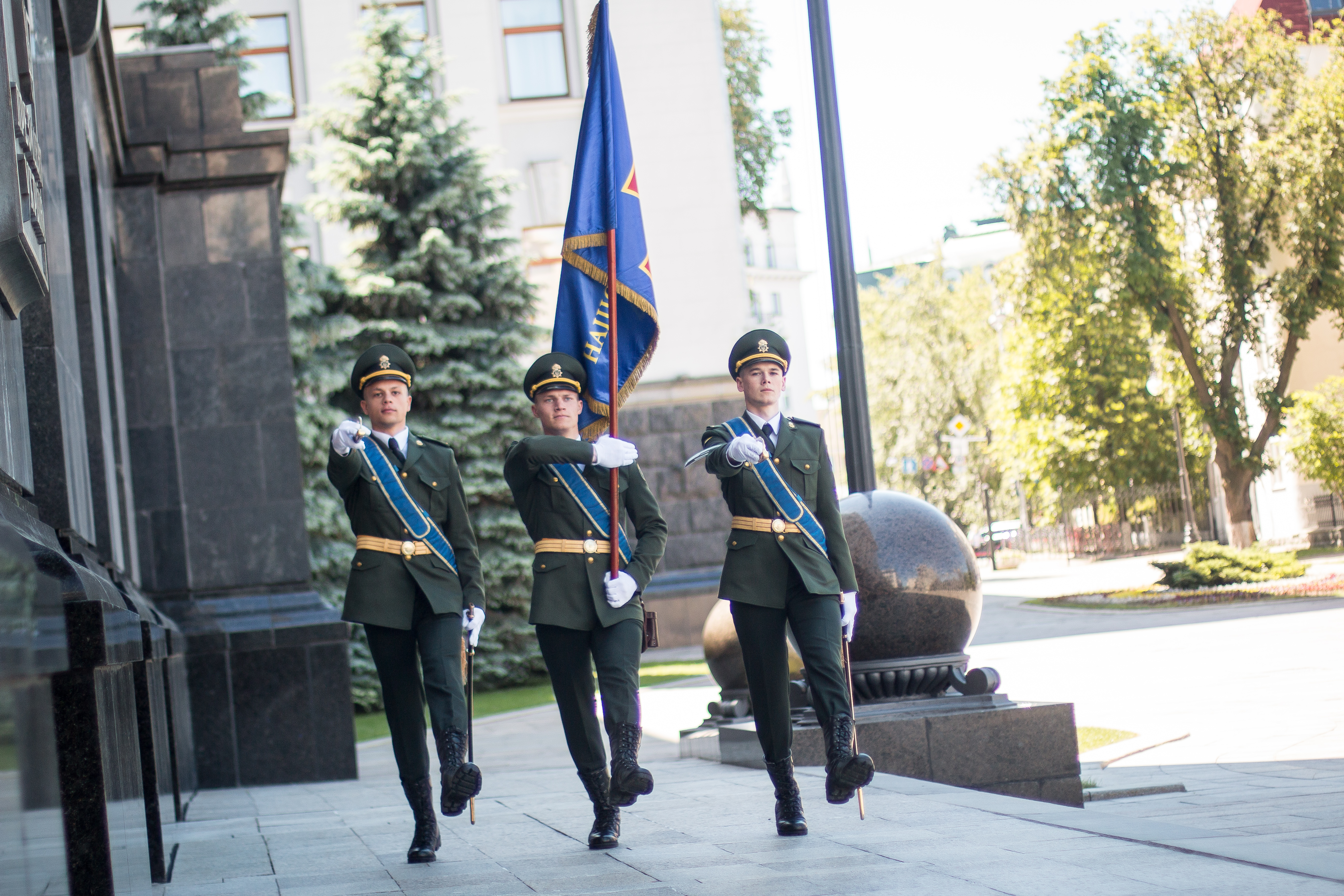

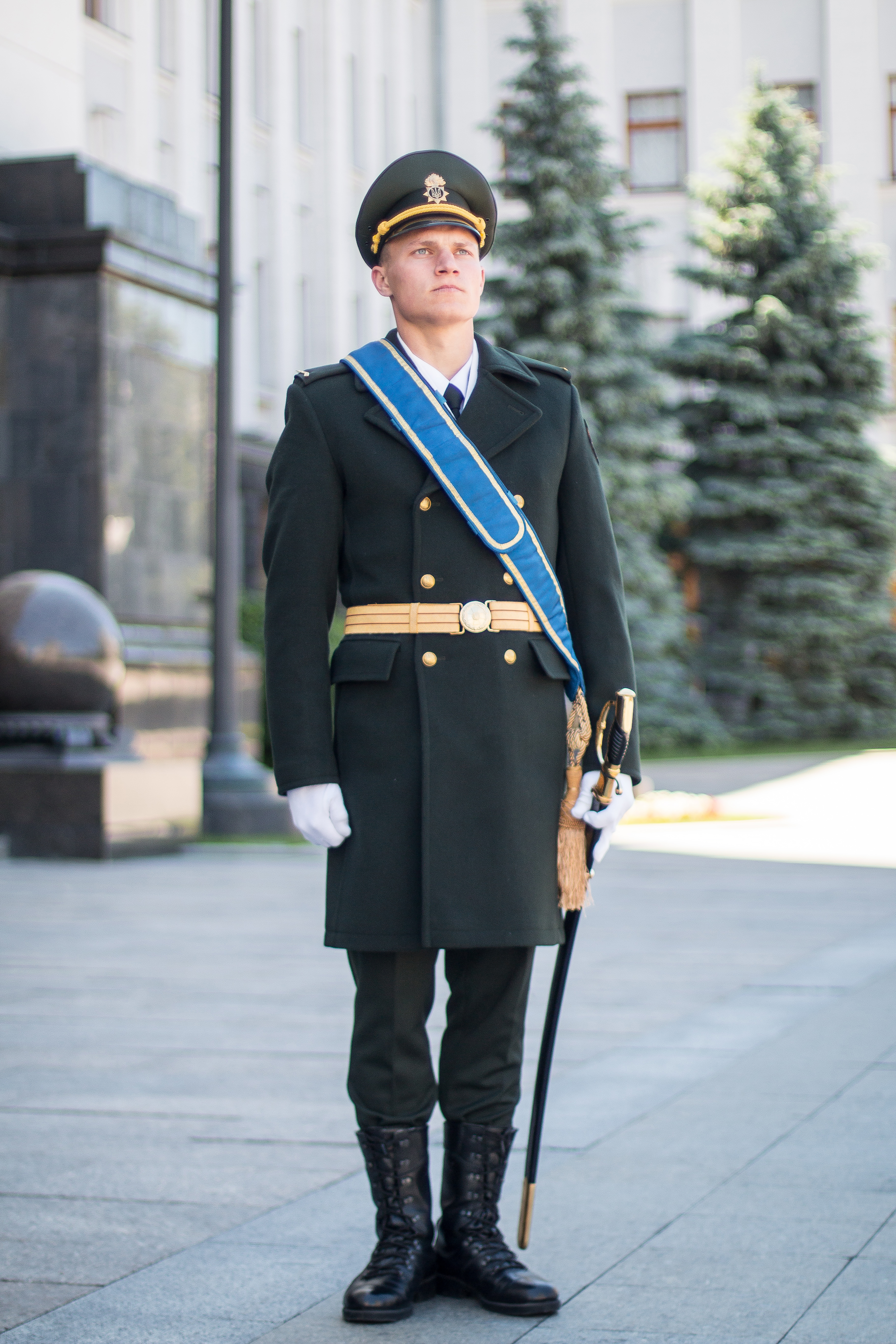
An officer of the battalion.

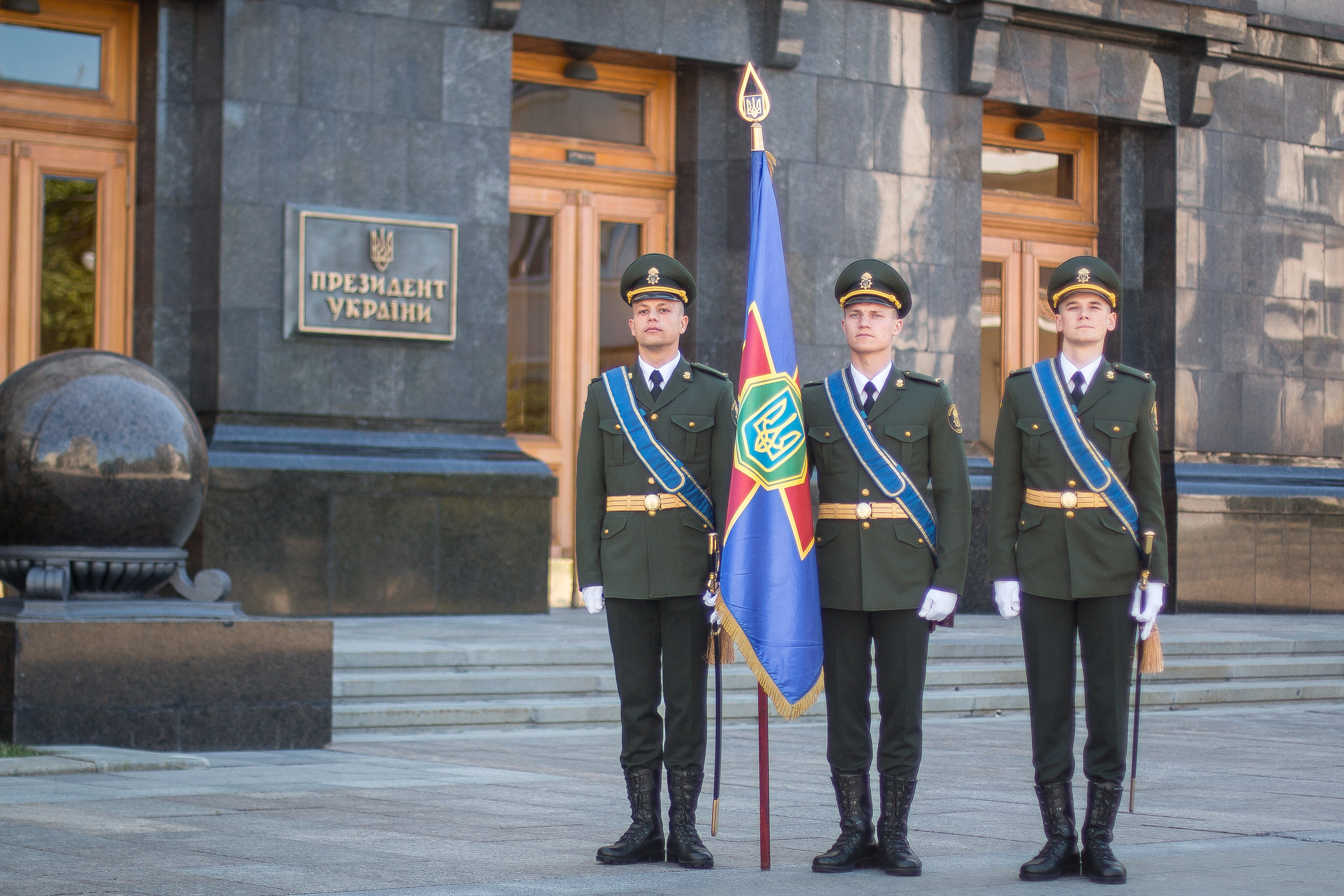
The Color Guard.

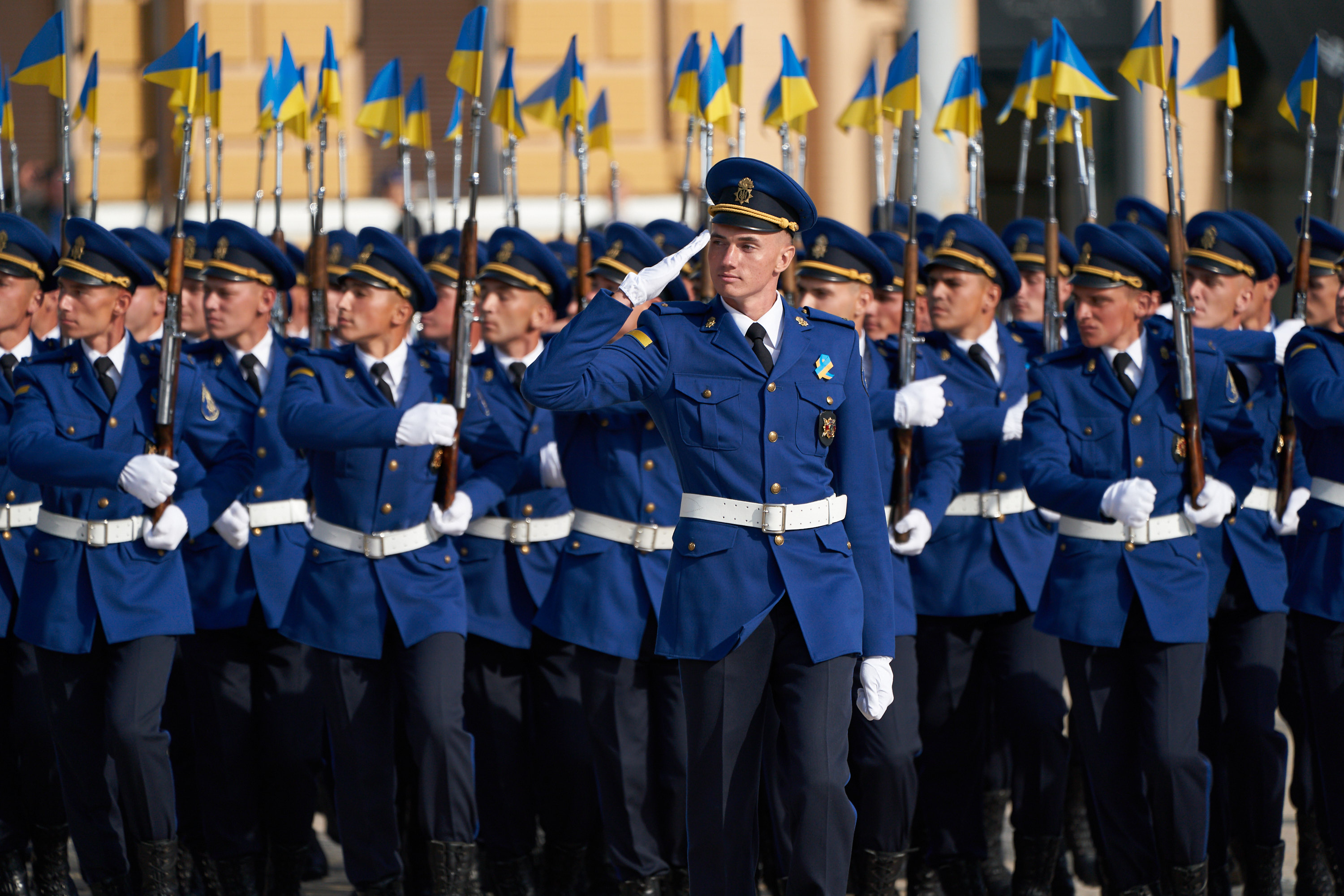
Members of the guard on the Day of the National Flag in 2019.

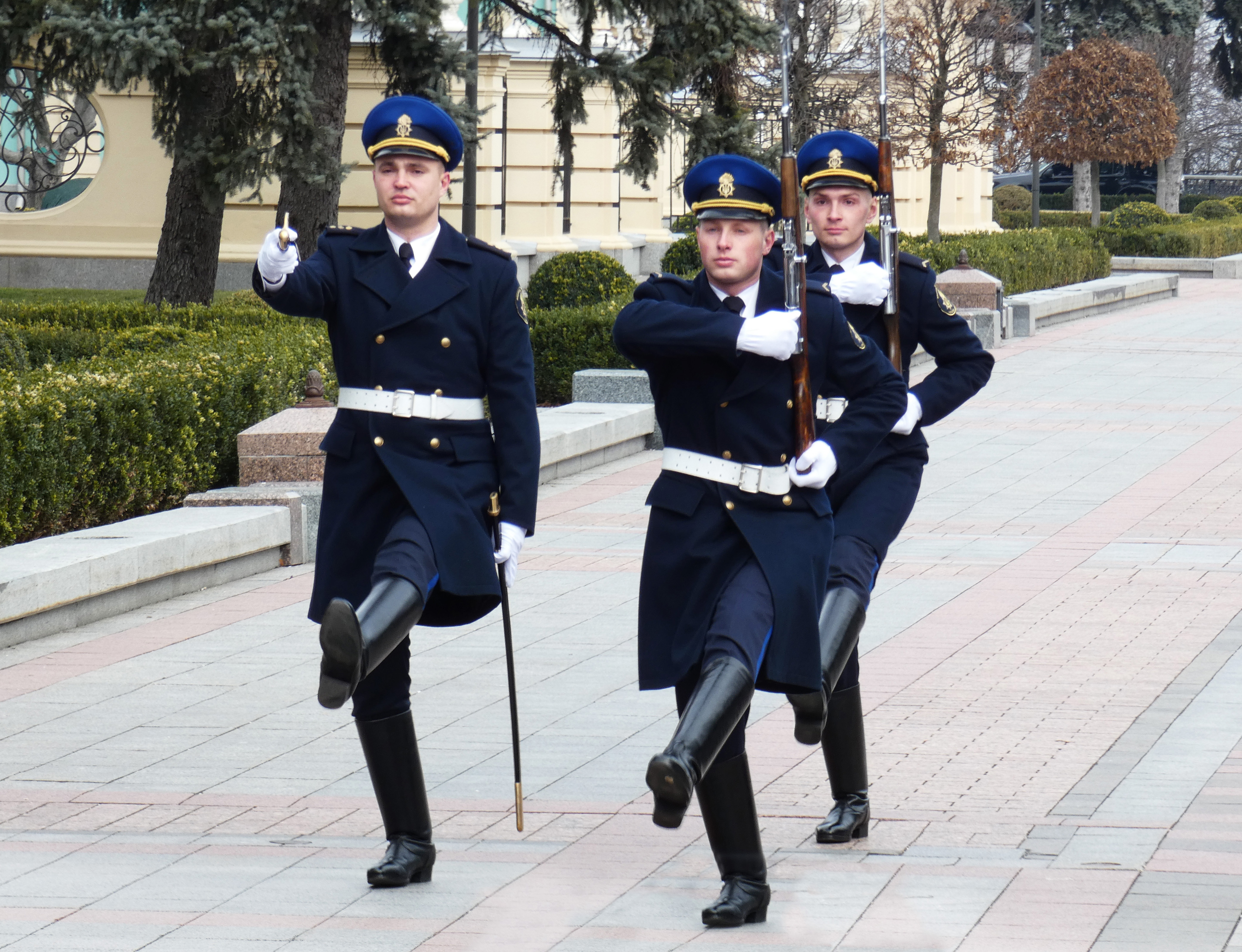
The three-man guard headed to Constitution Square.

== Videos ==
- An exhibition drill performance
- З Днем Незалежності, Україно!
- Нова традиція: церемоніали Почесної варти НГУ під стінами Верховної Ради у вихідні та святкові дні
