= 70th Anniversary of the Liberation of Kyiv =

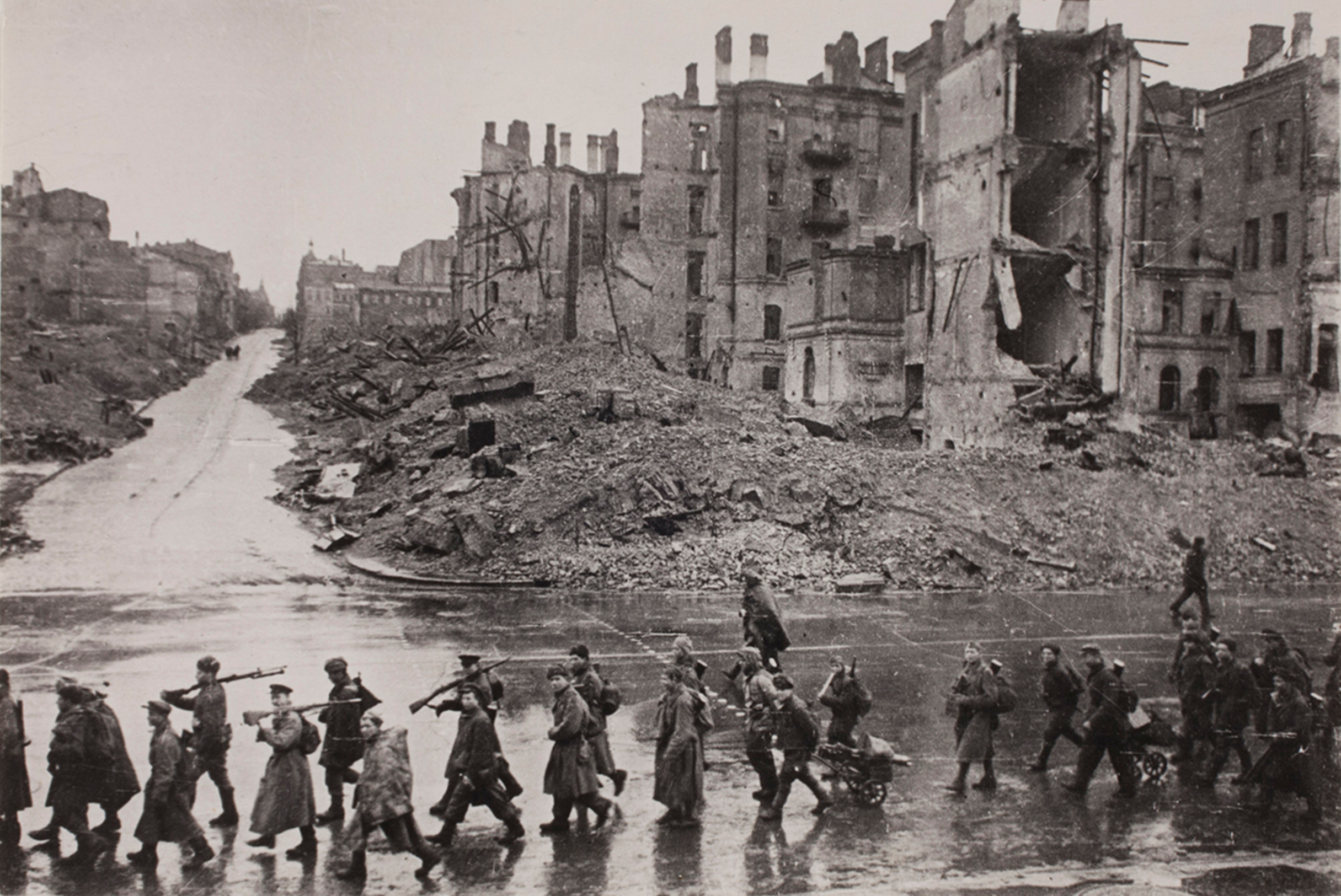
Kyiv's Khreshchatyk Street after the liberation of Kyiv.

The 70th Anniversary of the Liberation of Kyiv was a celebration in Kyiv, Ukraine, on November 6, 2013, on the occasion of the 70th anniversary of the liberation of Kyiv from the Nazi Invaders.

== Events ==
Kyiv hosted a military parade of the Armed Forces of Ukraine on Khreschatyk Street. Several dozens of military equipment passed through Maidan Nezalezhnosti, including T-34 tanks and Katyusha rocket launchers. During this, a procession of military bands from the Military Music Department of the General Staff of the Ukrainian Armed Forces took place, featuring:

- National Exemplary Band of the Armed Forces of Ukraine
- Military Band of the National Defense University
- Military Band of the Ivan Bohun Military High School
- Military Band of the Military Institute of the Taras Shevchenko National University of Kyiv
- Military Band of the Military Institute of Telecommunications and Information Technologies
- Military Band of the Internal Troops of Ukraine
- Drummers Ensemble of the National Academy of Internal Affairs

The massed bands were led by the commander of the Band of the Kyiv Presidential Honor Guard Battalion, Lieutenant Colonel Mikhail Ryabokon. The honor guard of the interior ministry also performed a special exhibition drill at the ceremony.

After the parade, solemn events were held in the Park of Eternal Glory. In the evening, a concert was organized on the Maidan, which ended with a festive fireworks display.
