= 25th Public Security Protection Brigade =

- Ukrainian: 25 окрема бригада охорони громадського порядку
- Insignia of the Brigade
- Active: 30 September 1966; 60 years ago
- Country: Ukraine
- Branch: National Guard of Ukraine
- Part of: Northern Operational-Territorial Command; 12th Army Corps
- Garrison/HQ: Kyiv
- Patron: Prince Askold

Commanders
- Current commander: Colonel Vitaliy Danko

The 25th Public Security Protection Brigade named after Prince Askold (Ukrainian: 25-та бригада охорони громадського порядку імені князя Аскольда) is a division within the Northern Operational-Territorial Command of the National Guard of Ukraine. Its headquarters is located in Kyiv.

== History ==
In 1966, in accordance with the decision of the Council of Ministers of the Ukrainian SSR, the 1st Special Motorized Police Regiment of the Ministry of Internal Affairs of the USSR was formed. On 2 January 1992 the 2nd regiment of the National Guard of Ukraine was founded, which became part of the 1st Kyiv Division. In 1995, the regiment was subordinated to the Internal Troops of Ukraine where it was renamed into the 10th special motorized regiment. In 2014, the brigade became part of the newly restored National Guard of Ukraine. 30 September is considered the professional holiday of the unit.

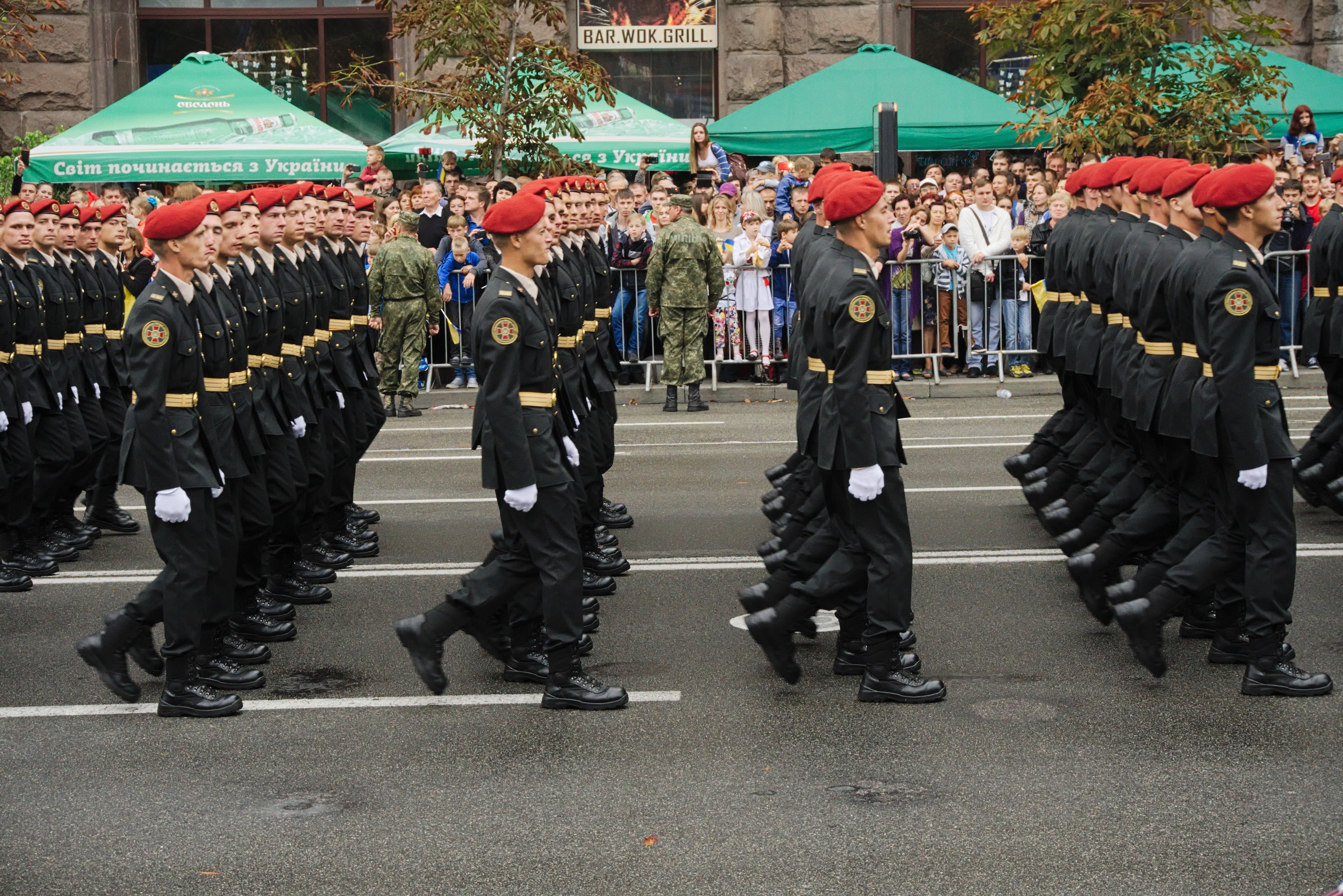
Soldiers of the 25th Brigade on parade in Kyiv. 2016

On the occasion of the 30th Independence Day of Ukraine Ukrainian president Volodymyr Zelenskyy renamed the unit's name to honour Prince Askold.

== Structure ==
- 25th Public Security Protection Brigade
  - Brigade HQ
  - NGU National Honor Guard Battalion
  - 1st Patrol Battalion
  - 2nd Patrol Battalion
  - 3rd Patrol Battalion
  - 4th Patrol Battalion
  - 5th Patrol Battalion

== Commanders ==
- Colonel Volodymyr Shelefost (2014-2018)
- Colonel Vitaly Danko (2018)
