= 28th Regiment of State Facilities Protection =

28th Regiment of State Facilities Protection 1st Nuclear Power Plant Protection Battalion (1982-2024)
- 28-й Чорнобильський полк НГ (Ukrainian)
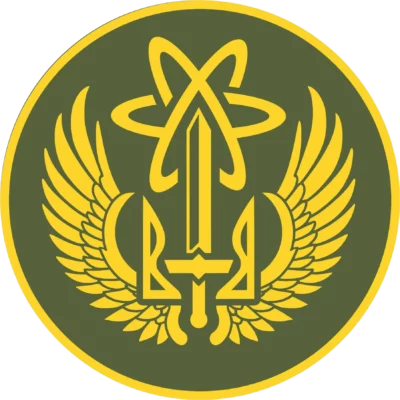
- Founded: 1992
- Country: Ukraine
- Allegiance: Ministry of Internal Affairs
- Branch: National Guard of Ukraine
- Type: Battalion
- Role: CBRN defense
- Part of: National Guard of Ukraine
- Garrison/HQ: Slavutych
- Anniversaries: 19 January
- Engagements: Russo-Ukrainian war: Russian invasion of Ukraine; Capture of Chernobyl

Commanders
- Current commander: Lieutenant Colonel Zhar Yevhen Kostyantynovich

Insignia
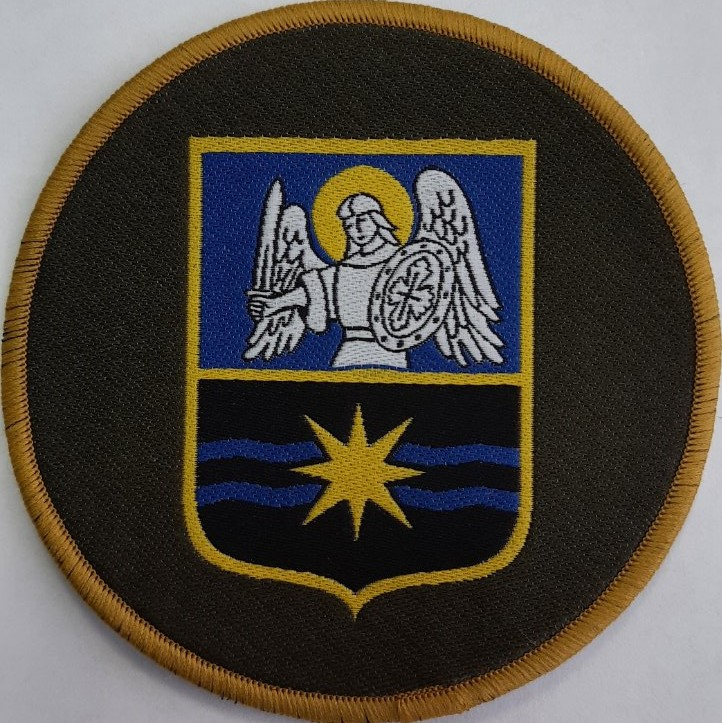
- Former Insignia

The 28th Regiment of State Facilities Protection, also called 28th Chernobyl Regiment of the National Guard is a regiment of the National Guard of Ukraine tasked with CBRN defense especially in the Chernobyl Exclusion Zone in the aftermath of the Chernobyl Disaster and has therefore seen combat against Russian forces during the Capture of Chernobyl amidst the Russian invasion of Ukraine with 169 soldiers of the unit being taken captive. In its current form, it was established in 1991 and headquartered at Slavutych.

== History ==
The battalion provided protection to the Chernobyl Nuclear Power Plant, chipboard and special cargos. Its roots go back to 1980, with the creation of the first specialized commandant's office for the protection of the Chernobyl Nuclear Power Plant of the Internal Troops of Ukraine, put into service in 1981. On 19 January 1982, it became a separate unit and on 22 September 1982, its headquarters was relocated to Pripyat. On 26 April 1986, on the day of the Chernobyl Disaster, the 1st Special Commandant's office was the first military unit to respond. After the incident, it was deployed in 1987 to ensure the protection of Chernobyl Exclusion Zone and performed their tasks until April 1990. On 27 June 1990, it was transferred to Slavutych and in 1991, became a part of the Internal Troops of Ukraine again tasked with the defense of the Chernobyl Nuclear Power Plant, implementation of barriers at the facility and prevention of theft of nuclear fuel and machinery. On 26 September 2014, it was transferred to the National Guard of Ukraine.

The Battalion saw combat during the Russian invasion of Ukraine especially during the Capture of Chernobyl where 169 soldiers of the Battalion were captured. On 24 February 2022, a scheduled shift change for the workers in the power plant was cancelled, the workers being informed that Russia had launched a full-scale invasion of Ukraine, and that the plant was to be put on high alert. That morning, there were around 300 people within the exclusion zone, including nuclear staff, medical staff, firefighters, 169 soldiers of the regiment and four tourists. A few hours later, Russian forces that had been stationed in Belarus broke into the exclusion zone through the village of Vilcha. By 2 p.m., they had reached the power plant's main administration office. In the following hours, the battalion's commanders negotiated a surrender with the Russian forces, and the Ukrainian government publicly announced that Russian forces had launched an attack on the Chernobyl Exclusion Zone. The Battalion were not armed with heavy weapons or equipment, and therefore could not effectively fight against Russian armored vehicles. The Ukrainian soldiers were encircled and two Tigr armored vehicles of the Russian Special Operations Forces entered the territory of the Nuclear Power Plant and gave an ultimatum, forcing the 169 soldiers of the battalion to surrender immediately, 70 of which were later released. The Battalion resumed its duties following the Russian withdrawal from Chernobyl.

It was reformed into a regiment in 2024.

== Structure ==
The structure of the regimentis as follows:

- 28th Regiment of State Facilities Protection
  - Management and Headquarters
  - Object Commandant's Office
  - 1st Special Commandant's Office
  - 2nd Special Commandant's Office
  - Special Purpose Platoon
  - Combat and Logistical Support Platoon
  - Engineering, Technical and Communications Platoon
  - Special Cargo Protection Group
  - Medical Center

== Commanders ==
- Lieutenant Colonel Zhar Yevhen Kostyantynovich
