= Sherp =

Amphibious off-road vehicle

SHERP
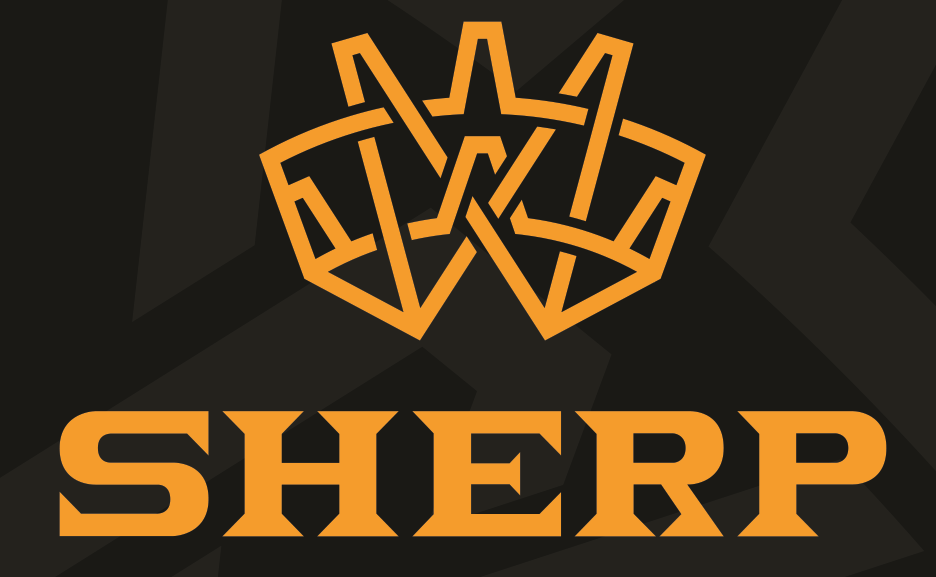

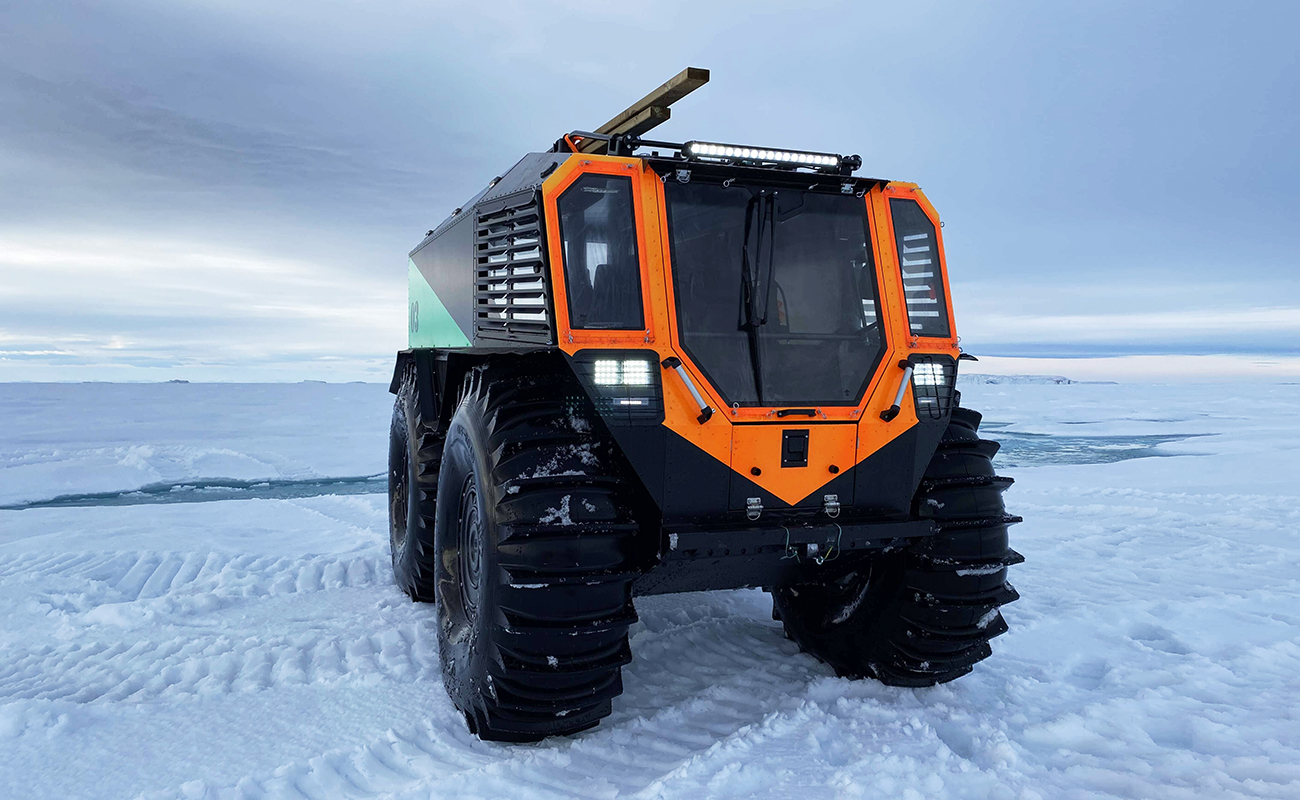
- Industry: Amphibious off-road vehicles
- Founded: 2012
- Headquarters: Kyiv, Ukraine
- Key people: Viktoria Tverdokhlib (CEO); Vlad Shkolnyk (Owner); Serhiy Samokhvalov (Owner)
- Products: Amphibious ATV/UTV/XTV
- Website: Official website

SHERP is a Ukrainian UTV designed for rough and soggy terrain. The company is headquartered in Kyiv (Ukraine). Its vehicles are sold worldwide through a dealership network including ARGO and STREIT Group.

The key feature of SHERP vehicles is their large tires with an onboard system to inflate or deflate them, allowing the vehicles to traverse water, underbrush, and icy surfaces.

Similar designs have been produced by other manufacturers such as BigBo and Shatun.

== History of creation ==
The Sherp all-terrain vehicle is based on a design developed by the late 2000s inventor Alexei Garagashyan from Saint Petersburg. One of his all-terrain vehicles was bought by Ukrainian entrepreneur Vladimir Shkolnik. Seeing the prospect of sales, Shkolnik created the production of all-terrain vehicles. In 2012, he set up a design office in Kyiv to refine the concept into an industrial product. Assuming the main sales in Russia, in 2014 he organized production in St. Petersburg.

In 2014, Sherp LLC (Russia) was established, serial production of snowmobiles began in 2015. In the same year, the Sherp was presented at the crossovers and off-road vehicles Moscow Off-Road Show 2015 held in Moscow. In March 2022, the Ukrainian company terminated the license agreement with Sherp LLC, which granted the Ukrainian company the right to use the Sherp LCC (Russia) trademark and patents.

In the summer of 2022, the company announced the SHERP N1200 modification. This version is intended for use in arctic climates: it is insulated, the windows are closed with special protective bars against polar bears, snow removal equipment and roof racks for luggage have appeared.

In 2023 Sherp and Argo announced a co-branding deal.

== In the media ==
In February 2016 SHERP appeared on the Top Gear Website.

In July 2017 SHERP was demonstrated in the Canadian towns of Whitehorse and Yellowknife.

In October 2017 SHERP was shown on the Diesel Brothers TV show.

In January 2018 the Sudbury SHERP dealer featured on Discovery Canada show Daily Planet.

In July 2019 the SHERP is featured with 2 Chainz in GQ and Viceland's video series Most Expensivest Sh*t.

In August 2019, SHERP is featured with Kevin Hart on Jay Leno's Garage.

In November 2019 SHERP were featured in Kanye West’s music videos for Follow God and Closed on Sunday. West also appeared with the SHERP in a 2022 Super Bowl LVI commercial for McDonald's.

On 2 January 2020, in the video game "Grand Theft Auto Online", in the weekly event called "Zhaba Week", following the "The Diamond Casino Heist" update, Rockstar Games released the Rune Zhaba amphibious off-road vehicle, inspired by the SHERP vehicles.

In December 2020, the SHERP was featured in the music video for the song "M3tamorphosis" by Playboi Carti and Kid Cudi.

In August 2023 SHERP vehicles were featured in the Star Trek: Strange New Worlds episode "Hegemony".

In 2024 a SHERP was featured on the Discovery Channel series Hoffman Family Gold a spin-off of the Gold Rush tv series. Also a SHERP was featured on a season of Bering Sea Gold as well.

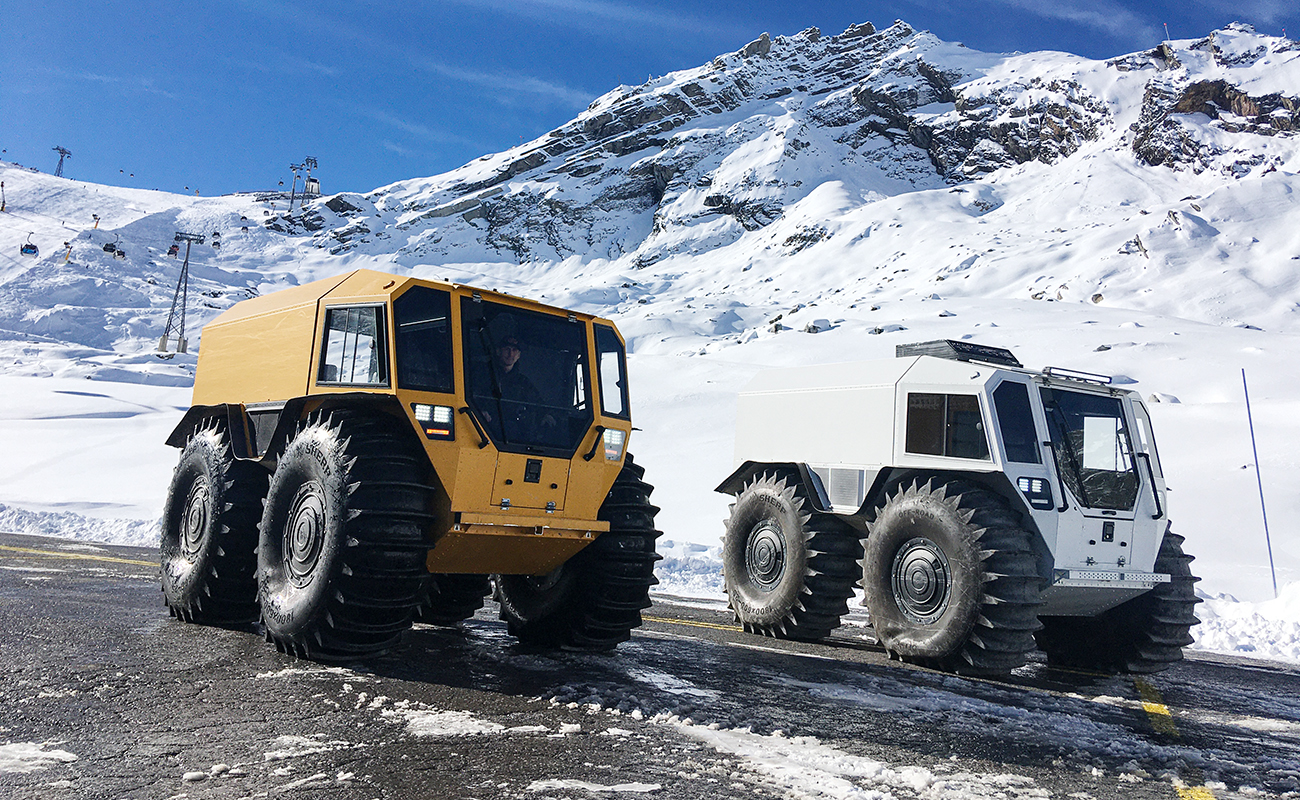

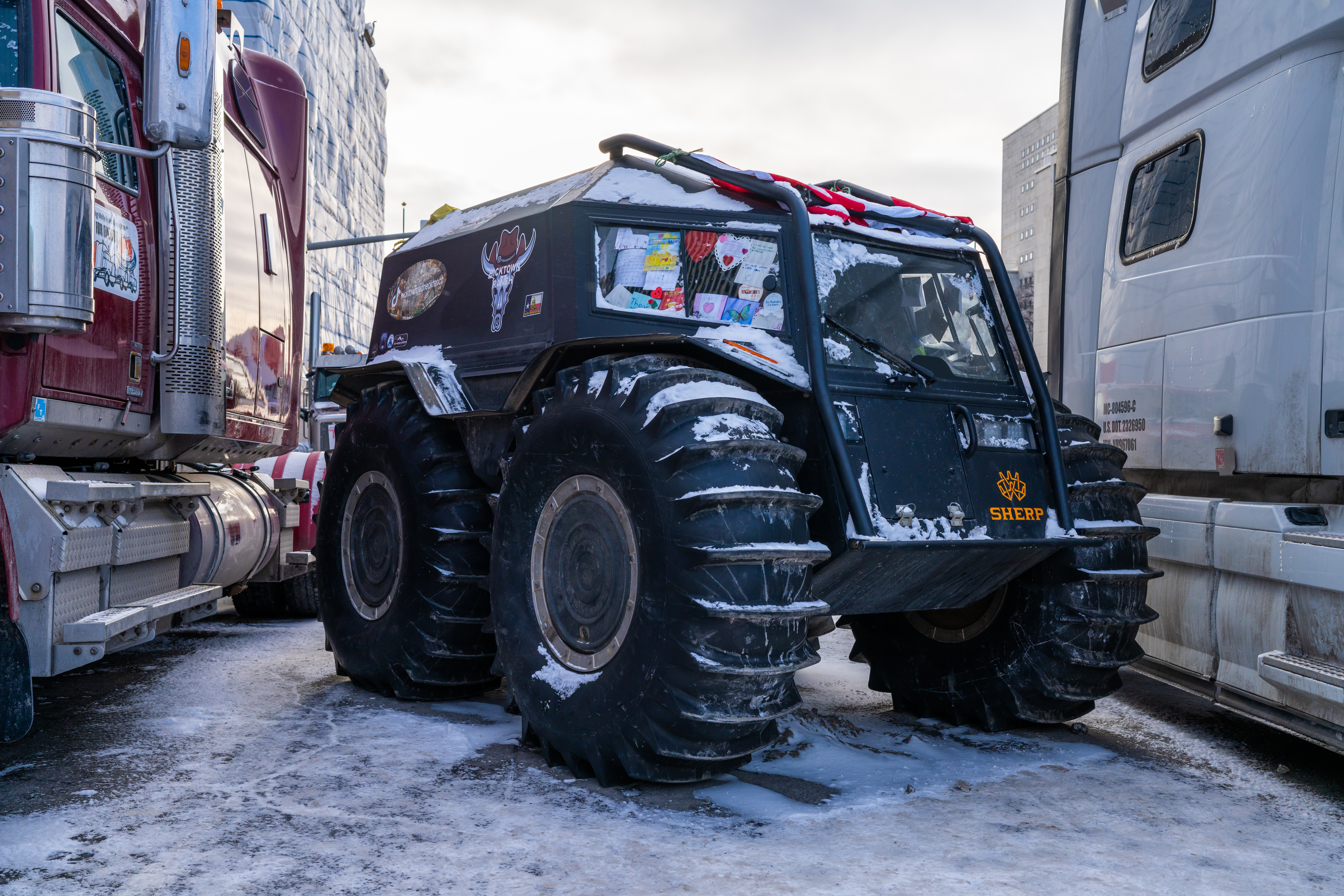

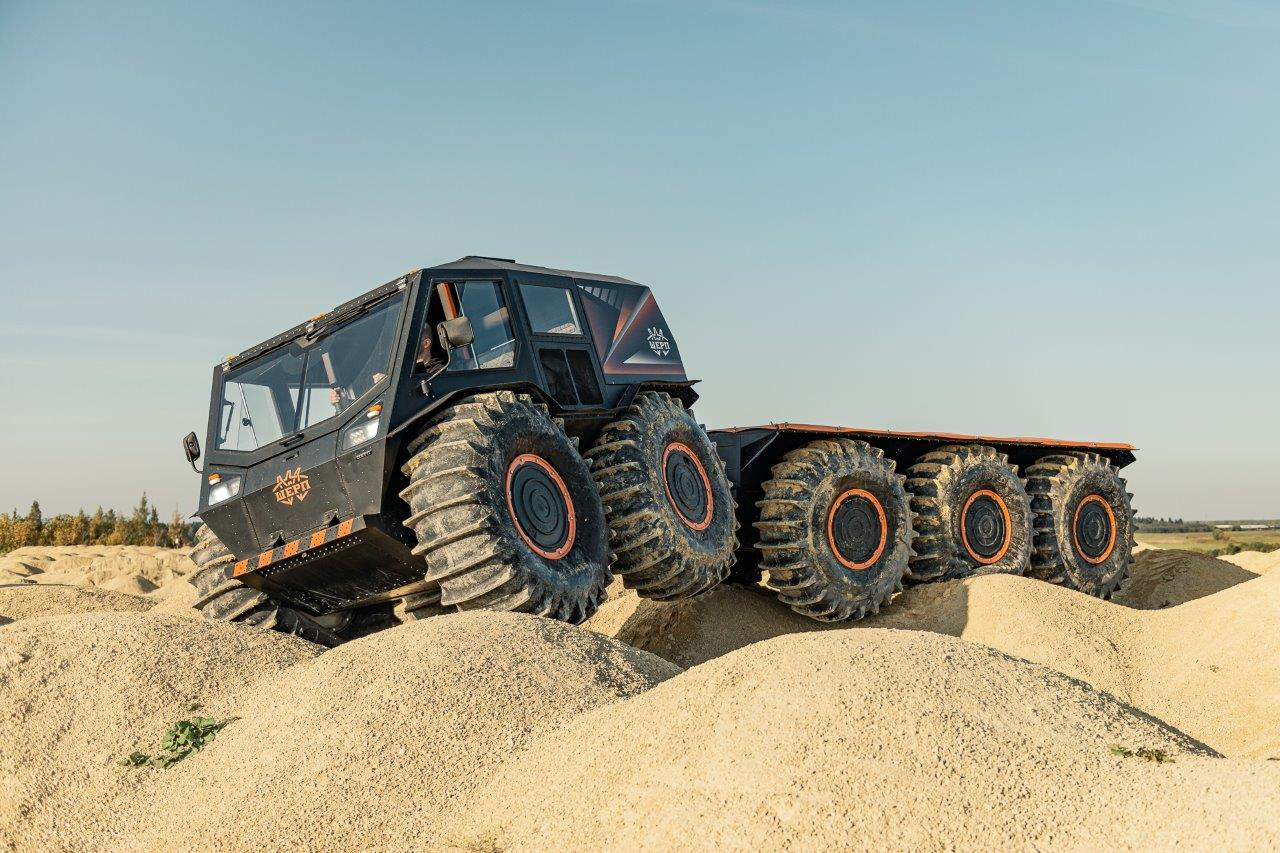

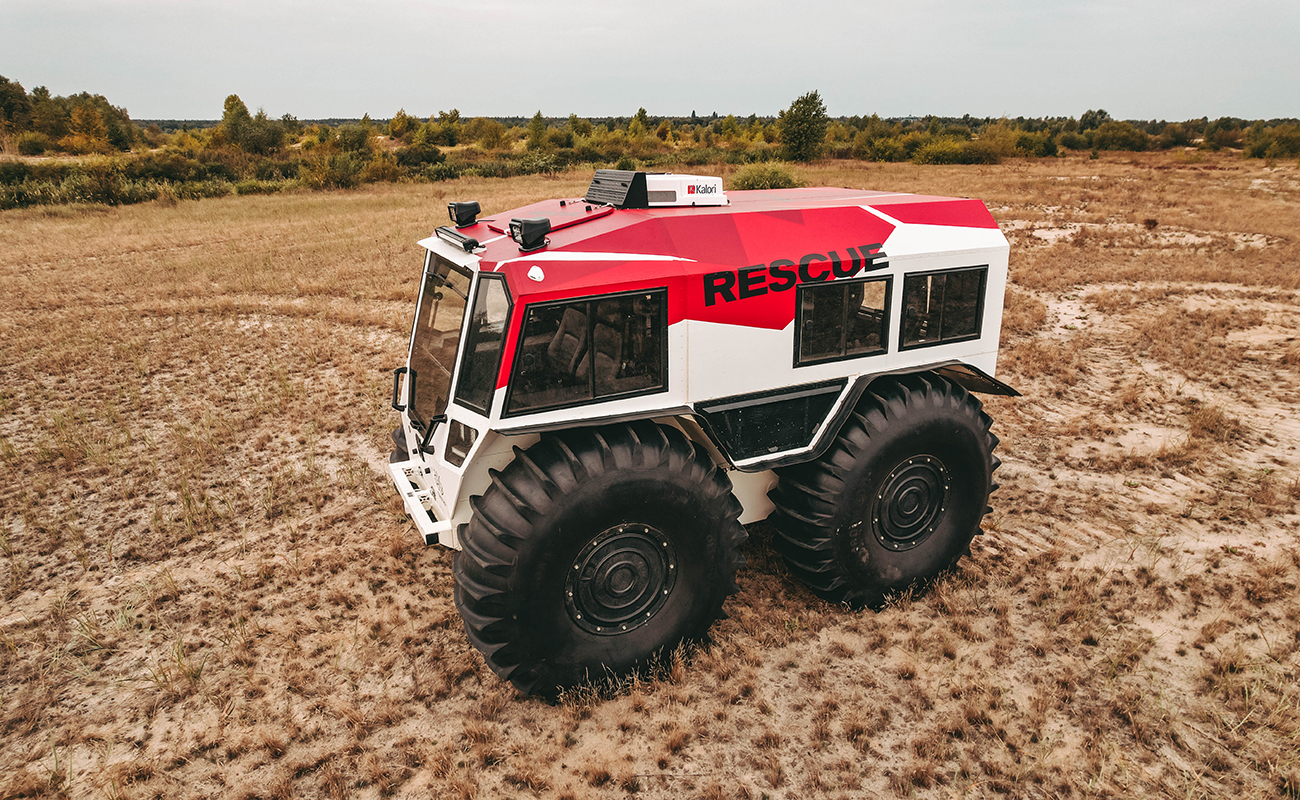

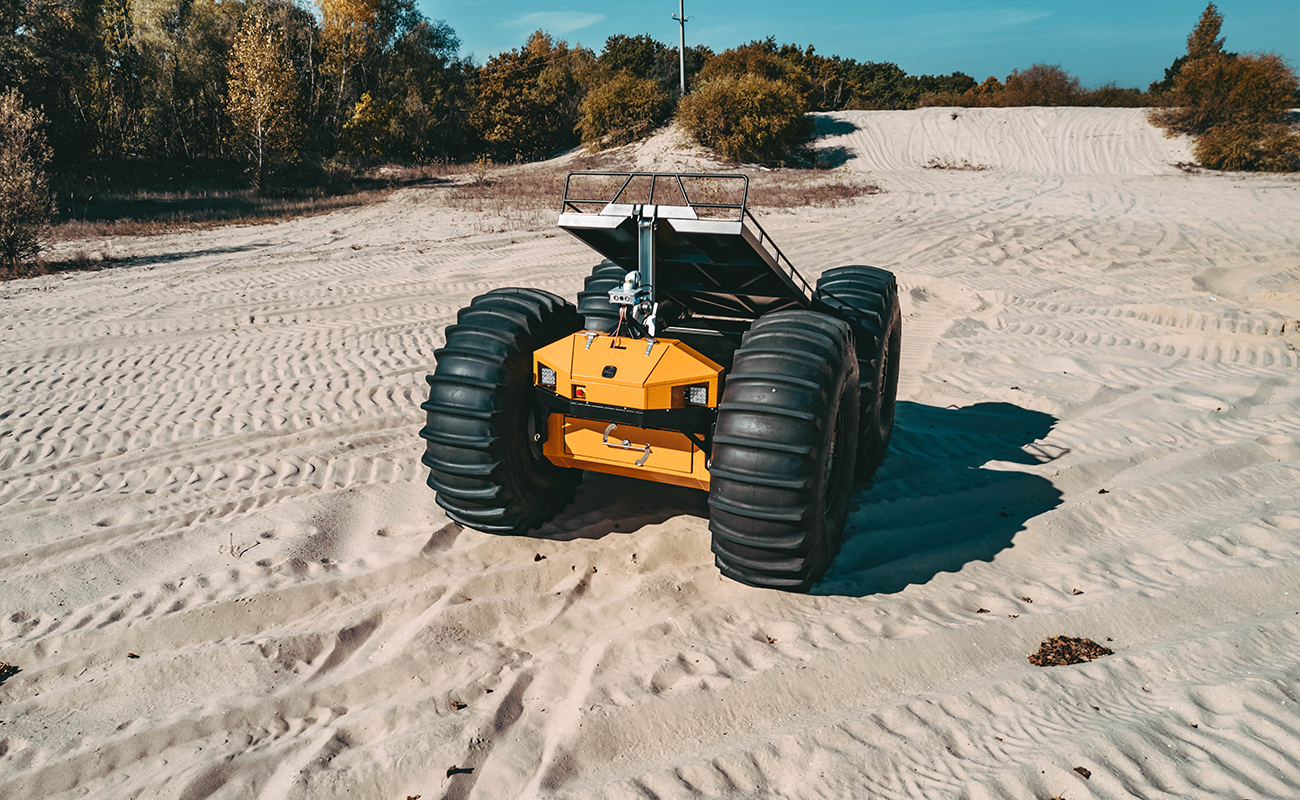

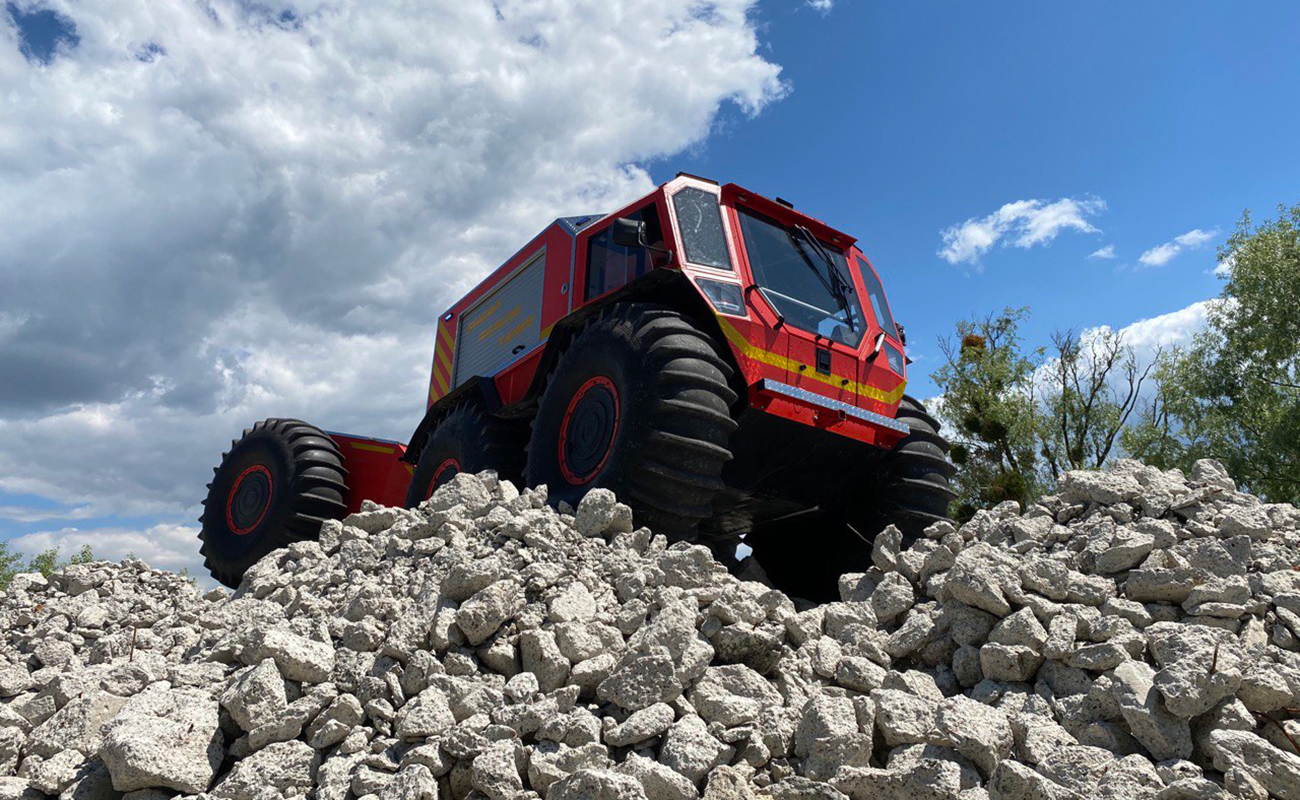
