= List of Heroes of Ukraine =

The article uses the latest official Romanization of Ukrainian on resolution of the Government of Ukraine.

This is a list of individuals who have been presented with the title Hero of Ukraine in reverse chronological order.

Number of awards by years (n_p - not published)

As of 31 October 2026, the total number of recipients was no less than 1,376 (of which decrees awarding 1,327 individuals were published, and for at least 49 individuals, the decrees were not made public).

Out of all recipients (considering only published decrees), 1051 (79%) have a distinction of the "Order of the Gold Star" and 276 (21%) have a distinction of the "Order of the State". Number of awards that were given posthumously is 683 (51%). By gender, 1280 (96%) of the recipients are men.

The youngest recipient is Stepan Chubenko (died at the age of 16 years and 258 days; awarded posthumously). The oldest recipient, Maksym Hulyi, received the award on his 100th birthday.

The only non-citizen awarded the award and for whom specifically an exclusion was made at parliamentary level was Belarusian Mikhail Zhyzneuski in June 2017 (Zhyzneuski was awarded posthumously). There are however 17 other individuals who were awarded the Hero of Ukraine and who were never citizens of Ukraine as they died before Ukraine obtained its independence. Among them are Avgustyn Voloshyn, Stepan Bandera (annulled), Volodymyr Ivasyuk, Vasyl Stus, liquidators Mykola Vashchuk, Vasyl Ihnatenko, Oleksandr Lelechko, Mykola Tytenok, Volodymyr Tishura.

There are 17 heroes of Ukraine who previously were awarded the Hero of Socialist Labour.

== 2026 ==
As of 31 October 2026: 118. (Note: One award given on 21 August 2026, to serviceman Yurii Spasskikh, was retroactively canceled on by Zelenskyy on 7 September 2026. The reason for the cancelation was not explained, although it was widely believed it was due to his involvement in criminal proceedings related to Euromaidan.)

== 2025 ==
Total number of awards: 212.

== 2024 ==
Total number of awards: 162.

N	English name	Ukrainian name	Conferment date	Distinction	Link	Notes
771	Valerii Zaluzhnyi	Вале́рій Фе́дорович Залу́жний	February 8, 2024	Gold Star	edict
770	Kyrylo Budanov	Кирило Олексійович Буданов	February 8, 2024	Gold Star	edict

== 2023 ==
Total number of awards: 143.

N	English name	Ukrainian name	Conferment date	Distinction	Link	Notes
769	Bijan Sharopov	Біжан Рашидович Шаропов	September 29, 2023	gold star	edict	posthumously
768	Viacheslav Shamko	В'ячеслав Євгенович Шамко	August 4, 2023	gold star	edict
767	Mykola Choban	Микола Іванович Чобан	July 8, 2023	gold star	edict
766	Oleksii Khyzhniak	Олексій Леонідович Хижняк	July 8, 2023	gold star	edict	posthumously
765	Serhii Kharchenko	Сергій Миколайович Харченко	July 8, 2023	gold star	edict
764	Andrii Soroka	Андрій Віталійович Сорока	July 8, 2023	gold star	edict	posthumously
763	Olha Simonova	Ольга Сергіївна Сімонова	July 8, 2023	gold star	edict	posthumously
762	Volodymyr Sova-Lisovets	Володимир Олександрович Сова-Лісовець	July 8, 2023	gold star	edict	posthumously
761	Denys Samofal	Денис Вікторович Самофал	July 8, 2023	gold star	edict	posthumously
760	Danylo Murashko	Данило Геннадійович Мурашко	July 8, 2023	gold star	edict	posthumously
759	Daniil Safonov	Даніїл Юрійович Сафонов	July 8, 2023	gold star	edict	posthumously
758	Oleksandr Makhachek	Олександр Ярославович Махачек	July 8, 2023	gold star	edict	posthumously
757	Volodymyr Prymachenko	Володимир Васильович Примаченко	July 8, 2023	gold star	edict	posthumously
756	Yaroslav Oliinyk	Ярослав Олексійович Олійник	July 8, 2023	gold star	edict	posthumously
755	Ivan Lieshchienkov	Іван Геннадійович Лєщєнков	July 8, 2023	gold star	edict	posthumously
754	Yurii Kovalchuk	Юрій Олександрович Ковальчук	July 8, 2023	gold star	edict	posthumously
753	Volodymyr Dudchenko	Володимир Володимирович Дудченко	July 8, 2023	gold star	edict	posthumously
752	Yurii Kaniuk	Юрій Ігорович Канюк	July 8, 2023	gold star	edict	posthumously
751	Vitalii Derekh	Віталій Мирославович Дерех	July 8, 2023	gold star	edict	posthumously
750	Vadym Blahovisnyi	Вадим Андрійович Благовісний	July 8, 2023	gold star	edict	posthumously
749	Volodymyr Barchuk	Володимир Васильович Барчук	July 8, 2023	gold star	edict	posthumously
748	Ivan Shchoholev	Іван Євгенович Щоголев	July 8, 2023	gold star	edict	posthumously
747	Vladyslav Skvortsov	Владислав Юрійович Скворцов	July 8, 2023	gold star	edict	posthumously
746	Mykhailo Reutskyi	Михайло Іванович Реуцький	July 8, 2023	gold star	edict	posthumously
745	Mykola Makarevych	Микола Миколайович Макаревич	July 8, 2023	gold star	edict	posthumously
744	Vadym Lysenkov	Вадим Миколайович Лисенков	July 8, 2023	gold star	edict	posthumously
743	Denys Labunskyi	Денис Богданович Лабунський	July 8, 2023	gold star	edict	posthumously
742	Bohdan Kalahurskyi	Богдан Петрович Калагурський	July 8, 2023	gold star	edict	posthumously
741	Taras Dovhun	Тарас Сергійович Довгун	July 8, 2023	gold star	edict	posthumously
740	Vladyslav Horban	Владислав Вячеславович Горбань	July 8, 2023	gold star	edict	posthumously
739	Mykola Yanyshyn	Микола Олександрович Янишин	July 8, 2023	gold star	edict	posthumously
738	Mykhailo Chabanenko	Михайло Анатолійович Чабаненко	July 8, 2023	gold star	edict	posthumously
737	Yevhen Khrapko	Євген Вікторович Храпко	July 8, 2023	gold star	edict	posthumously
735	Serhii Suchkov	Сергій Веніамінович Сучков	July 8, 2023	gold star	edict	posthumously
734	Volodymyr Stelmakh	Володимир Володимирович Стельмах	July 8, 2023	gold star	edict	posthumously
733	Dmytro Romanchenko	Дмитро Юрійович Романченко	July 8, 2023	gold star	edict	posthumously
732	Oleksandr Romanov	Олександр Олегович Романов	July 8, 2023	gold star	edict	posthumously
731	Oleksii Myrshavyi	Олексій Вікторович Миршавий	July 8, 2023	gold star	edict	posthumously
730	Kyrylo Marach	Кирило Сергійович Марач	July 8, 2023	gold star	edict	posthumously
729	Yevhen Lysenko	Євген Вадимович Лисенко	July 8, 2023	gold star	edict	posthumously
728	Oleksandr Leunov	Олександр Володимирович Леунов	July 8, 2023	gold star	edict	posthumously
727	Serhii Korol	Сергій Володимирович Король	July 8, 2023	gold star	edict	posthumously
726	Ihor Kolesnichenko	Ігор Андрійович Колесніченко	July 8, 2023	gold star	edict	posthumously
725	Valentyn Klymchuk	Валентин Васильович Климчук	July 8, 2023	gold star	edict	posthumously
724	Eduard Kamardin	Едуард Русланович Камардін	July 8, 2023	gold star	edict	posthumously
723	Serhii Verbytskyi	Сергій Сергійович Вербицький	July 8, 2023	gold star	edict
722	Roman Butusin	Роман Олегович Бутусін	July 8, 2023	gold star	edict	posthumously
721	Leonid Butusin	Леонід Олегович Бутусін	July 8, 2023	gold star	edict	posthumously
720	Serhii Bozhko	Сергій Віталійович Божко	July 8, 2023	gold star	edict	posthumously
719	Vadym Blyshchyk	Вадим Адамович Блищик	July 8, 2023	gold star	edict	posthumously
718	Sviatoslav Aleksapolskyi	Святослав Миколайович Алексапольський	July 8, 2023	gold star	edict	posthumously
717	Serhii Yaremenko	Сергій Володимирович Яременко	June 27, 2023	gold star	edict
716	Oleksandr Kovalenko	Олександр Володимирович Коваленко	June 27, 2023	gold star	edict
715	Oleh Olyva	Олег Русланович Олива	June 24, 2023	gold star	edict
714	Serhii Dudin	Сергій Олександрович Дудін	June 24, 2023	gold star	edict
713	Vasyl Bohach	Василь Володимирович Богач	June 12, 2023	gold star	edict	posthumously
712	Mykola Palas	Микола Дмитрович Палас	May 18, 2023	gold star	edict
711	Yurii Andriienko	Юрій Олександрович Андрієнко	May 18, 2023	gold star	edict
710	Serhii Sirchenko	Сергій Анатолійович Сірченко	May 5, 2023	gold star	edict
709	Valerii Hliebov	Валерій Васильович Глєбов	May 5, 2023	gold star	edict	posthumously
708	Serhii Yandulskyi	Сергій Юрійович Яндульський	March 30, 2023	gold star	edict
707	Oleksandr Pivnenko	Олександр Сергійович Півненко	March 23, 2023	gold star	edict
706	Dmytro Bashkintsev	Дмитро Олексійович Башкінцев	March 23, 2023	gold star	edict
705	Illia Verhun	Ілля Володимирович Вергун	March 21, 2023	gold star	edict
704	Oleksandr Korniichuk	Олександр Вікторович Корнійчук	March 20, 2023	gold star	edict
703	Viacheslav Khodakivskyi	В'ячеслав Анатолійович Ходаківський	March 20, 2023	gold star	edict	posthumously
702	Oleksandr Matsievskyi	Олександр Ігорович Мацієвський	March 13, 2023	gold star	edict	posthumously
701	Oleksii Kovalenko	Олексій Олександрович Коваленко	February 26, 2023	gold star	edict	posthumously
700	Heorhii Strelkov	Георгій Миколайович Стрелков	February 23, 2023	gold star	edict	posthumously
699	Oleh Chornomorets	Олег Васильович Чорноморець	February 23, 2023	gold star	edict	posthumously
698	Denys Rikhter	Денис Сергійович Ріхтер	February 23, 2023	gold star	edict	posthumously
697	Valerii Oshkalo	Валерій Миколайович Ошкало	February 23, 2023	gold star	edict	posthumously
696	Serhii Mishchenko	Сергій Олексійович Міщенко	February 23, 2023	gold star	edict	posthumously
695	Roman Chekhun	Роман Георгійович Чехун	February 23, 2023	gold star	edict	posthumously
694	Illia Akhmetharieiev	Ілля Шамільєвич Ахметгарєєв	February 23, 2023	gold star	edict	posthumously
693	Andrii Koshovets	Андрій Віталійович Кошовець	February 23, 2023	gold star	edict
692	Oleh Lakusta	Олег Корнійович Лакуста	February 23, 2023	gold star	edict
691	Yurii Yurchyk	Юрій Олександрович Юрчик	February 23, 2023	gold star	edict	posthumously
690	Dmytro Kushnir	Дмитро Володимирович Кушнір	February 23, 2023	gold star	edict
689	Artem Sharkov	Артем Володимирович Шарков	February 23, 2023	gold star	edict
688	Vitalii Onoprienko	Віталій Сергійович Онопрієнко	February 23, 2023	gold star	edict

== 2022 ==
Total number of awards: 196.

N	English name	Ukrainian name	Conferment date	Distinction	Link	Notes
687	Vadym Yashchenko	Вадим Юрійович Ященко	December 27, 2022	gold star	edict
686	Oleksii Osypenko	Олексій Леонідович Осипенко	December 27, 2022	gold star	edict
685	Mykola Nosenko	Микола Анатолійович Носенко	December 27, 2022	gold star	edict	posthumously
684	Roman Hakh	Роман Васильович Гах	December 27, 2022	gold star	edict	posthumously
683	Vladyslav Allerov	Владислав Юрійович Аллеров	December 27, 2022	gold star	edict	posthumously
682	Ihor Levchenko	Ігор Вікторович Левченко	December 11, 2022	gold star	edict
681	Dmytro Bublyk	Дмитро Вячеславович Бублик	December 11, 2022	gold star	edict
680	Andrii Verkhohliad	Андрій Леонідович Верхогляд	December 11, 2022	gold star	edict	posthumously
679	Mykhailo Kuratchenko	Михайло Вітальович Куратченко	December 8, 2022	gold star	edict	posthumously
678	Mykola Chumak	Микола Миколайович Чумак	December 5, 2022	gold star	edict
677	Vadym Voroshylov	Вадим Олександрович Ворошилов	December 5, 2022	gold star	edict
676	Volodymyr Vesnin	Володимир Андрійович Веснін	December 5, 2022	gold star	edict
675	Volodymyr Potieshkin	Володимир Олександрович Потєшкін	December 5, 2022	gold star	edict
674	Oleksii Maistrenko	Олексій Сергійович Майстренко	December 5, 2022	gold star	edict
673	Denys Makarovskyi	Денис Сергійович Макаровський	November 18, 2022	gold star	edict
672	Vitalii Bokhonok	Віталій Володимирович Бохонок	November 18, 2022	gold star	edict	posthumously
671	Andrii Orlov	Андрій Ігорович Орлов	November 14, 2022	gold star	edict
670	Serhii Poberezhets	Сергій Петрович Побережець	October 14, 2022	gold star	edict
669	Mykola Oleshchuk	Микола Миколайович Олещук	October 14, 2022	gold star	edict
668	Borys Kharchuk	Борис Миколайович Харчук	October 14, 2022	gold star	edict
667	Ihor Skybiuk	Ігор Анатолійович Скибюк	October 14, 2022	gold star	edict
666	Yevhen Soloviov	Євген Сергійович Соловйов	October 14, 2022	gold star	edict
665	Valerii Padytel	Валерій Борисович Падитель	October 14, 2022	gold star	edict
664	Yevhenii Kurash	Євгеній Юрійович Кураш	October 14, 2022	gold star	edict
663	Rostyslav Kozii	Ростислав Володимирович Козій	October 14, 2022	gold star	edict
662	Dmytro Zavadskyi	Дмитро Вадимович Завадський	October 14, 2022	gold star	edict
661	Oleh Honcharuk	Олег Миколайович Гончарук	October 14, 2022	gold star	edict
660	Ivan Hvozdiev	Іван Олексійович Гвоздєв	October 14, 2022	gold star	edict	posthumously
659	Myroslav Symchych	Мирослав Васильович Симчич	October 14, 2022	gold star	edict
658	Dmytro Finashyn	Дмитро Русланович Фінашин	October 6, 2022	gold star	edict
657	Vadym Manko	Вадим Олександрович Манько	October 6, 2022	gold star	edict	posthumously
656	Vadym Zeleniuk	Вадим Сергійович Зеленюк	October 6, 2022	gold star	edict	posthumously
655	Denys Shleha	Денис Олексійович Шлега	October 1, 2022	gold star	edict
654	Oleh Khomenko	Олег Сергійович Хоменко	October 1, 2022	gold star	edict
653	Sviatoslav Palamar	Святослав Ярославович Паламар	October 1, 2022	gold star	edict
652	Serhii Volynskyi	Сергій Ярославович Волинський	October 1, 2022	gold star	edict
651	Serhii Sova	Сергій Олександрович Сова	September 24, 2022	gold star	edict	posthumously
650	Bohdan Karvatko	Богдан Владиславович Карватко	September 16, 2022	gold star	edict	posthumously
649	Serhii Zherzhevskyi	Сергій Олександрович Жержевський	September 16, 2022	gold star	edict	posthumously
648	Serhii Barsukov	Сергій Ігорович Барсуков	September 16, 2022	gold star	edict	posthumously
647	Taras Bobanych	Тарас Миколайович Бобанич	August 24, 2022	gold star	edict	posthumously
646	Oleksandr Yurkovskyi	Олександр Олександрович Юрковський	August 5, 2022	gold star	edict
645	Yaroslav Melnyk	Ярослав Ігорович Мельник	August 5, 2022	gold star	edict
644	Dmytro Shumakov	Дмитро Олександрович Шумаков	August 5, 2022	gold star	edict
643	Oleh Hrudzevych	Олег Петрович Грудзевич	July 8, 2022	gold star	edict
642	Roman Hlomba	Роман Михайлович Гломба	June 20, 2022	gold star	edict
641	Vadym Sukharevskyi	Вадим Олегович Сухаревський	June 18, 2022	gold star	edict
640	Oleh Holinei	Олег Васильович Голіней	June 17, 2022	gold star	edict
639	Vitalii Lytvyn	Віталій Сергійович Литвин	June 5, 2022	gold star	edict
638	Serhii Parkhomenko	Сергій Ігорович Пархоменко	May 20, 2022	gold star	edict	posthumously
637	Kyrylo Ahasyiev	Кирило Яшар огли Агасиєв	May 16, 2022	gold star	edict
636	Viacheslav Yerko	В’ячеслав Володимирович Єрко	May 16, 2022	gold star	edict	posthumously
635	Roman Kachur	Роман Володимирович Качур	May 12, 2022	gold star	edict
634	Ihor Bedzai	Ігор Володимирович Бедзай	May 11, 2022	gold star	edict	posthumously
633	Oleh Hehechkori	Олег Іродійович Гегечкорі	May 8, 2022	gold star	edict	posthumously
632	Roman Mamavko	Роман Михайлович Мамавко	May 3, 2022	gold star	edict
631	Bohdan Dronov	Богдан Миколайович Дронов	May 3, 2022	gold star	edict
630	Dmytro Todorov	Дмитро Русланович Тодоров	May 2, 2022	gold star	edict
629	Serhii Naiev	Сергій Іванович Наєв	April 27, 2022	gold star	edict
628	Bohdan Leshchyshyn	Богдан Григорович Лещишин	April 25, 2022	gold star	edict	posthumously
627	Denys Chaiuk	Денис Валентинович Чаюк	April 24, 2022	gold star	edict
626	Mykola Tsiuryk	Микола Володимирович Цюрик	April 20, 2022	gold star	edict	posthumously
625	Oleksandr Tsiupak	Олександр Сергійович Цюпак	April 20, 2022	gold star	edict	posthumously
624	Yehor Serediuk	Єгор Васильович Середюк	April 20, 2022	gold star	edict	posthumously
623	Roman Martseniuk	Роман Юрійович Марценюк	April 20, 2022	gold star	edict	posthumously
622	Oleksandr Hryhoriev	Олександр Олександрович Григор'єв	April 20, 2022	gold star	edict	posthumously
621	Georgy Tarasenko	Георгій Олександрович Тарасенко	April 17, 2022	gold star	edict	posthumously
620	Vitalii Kucheriavyi	Віталій Вікторович Кучерявий	April 17, 2022	gold star	edict	posthumously
619	Ihor Dashko	Ігор Тарасович Дашко	April 17, 2022	gold star	edict	posthumously
618	Lev Pashko	Лев Валерійович Пашко	April 17, 2022	gold star	edict
617	Roman Sobkiv	Роман Васильович Собків	April 17, 2022	gold star	edict	posthumously
616	Viktor Holovko	Віктор Олександрович Головко	April 17, 2022	gold star	edict	posthumously
615	Dmytro Kashchenko	Дмитро Валерійович Кащенко	April 15, 2022	gold star	edict
614	Oleksandr Kukurba	Олександр Васильович Кукурба	April 14, 2022	gold star	edict
613	Yulian Stupak	Юліан Юрійович Ступак	April 13, 2022	gold star	edict	posthumously
612	Oleksandr Harbuz	Олександр Русланович Гарбуз	April 13, 2022	gold star	edict	posthumously
611	Dmytro Vasyliev	Дмитро Миколайович Васильєв	April 13, 2022	gold star	edict	posthumously
610	Oleksii Skoblia	Олексій Миколайович Скобля	April 12, 2022	gold star	edict	posthumously
609	Viktor Otserklevych	Віктор Ярославович Оцерклевич	April 12, 2022	gold star	edict	posthumously
608	Volodymyr Baliuk	Володимир Петрович Балюк	April 12, 2022	gold star	edict	posthumously
607	Andrii Shohan	Андрій Володимирович Шоган	April 7, 2022	gold star	edict
606	Oleksandr Shemet	Олександр Леонідович Шемет	April 7, 2022	gold star	edict
605	Oleksandr Liashenko	Олександр Юрійович Ляшенко	April 7, 2022	gold star	edict
604	Oleksandr Kliuchka	Олександр Сергійович Ключка	April 7, 2022	gold star	edict
603	Pavlo Bilous	Павло Віталійович Білоус	April 7, 2022	gold star	edict
602	Oleksandr Syrskyi	Олександр Станіславович Сирський	April 5, 2022	gold star	edict
601	Andrii Tsarenko	Андрій Юрійович Царенко	April 4, 2022	gold star	edict
600	Serhii Starchenko	Сергій Олександрович Старченко	April 4, 2022	gold star	edict
599	Rodion Kulahin	Родіон Анатолійович Кулагін	April 4, 2022	gold star	edict
598	Oleksandr Zuhravyi	Олександр В’ячеславович Зугравий	April 4, 2022	gold star	edict
597	Kyrylo Veres	Кирило Кирилович Верес	April 4, 2022	gold star	edict
596	Vitalii Bondaruk	Віталій Анатолійович Бондарук	April 4, 2022	gold star	edict	posthumously
595	Viktor Shilimov	Віктор Євгенович Шілімов	April 2, 2022	gold star	edict
594	Vitalii Savych	Віталій Григорович Савич	April 2, 2022	gold star	edict
593	Serhii Ponomarenko	Сергій Іванович Пономаренко	April 2, 2022	gold star	edict
592	Artem Slisarchuk	Артем Олександрович Слісарчук	April 2, 2022	gold star	edict	posthumously
591	Maksym Kahal	Максим Володимирович Кагал	April 2, 2022	gold star	edict	posthumously
590	Vitalii Hrytsaienko	Віталій Миколайович Грицаєнко	April 2, 2022	gold star	edict	posthumously
589	Oleksandr Brynzhala	Олександр Петрович Бринжала	April 2, 2022	gold star	edict	posthumously
588	Oleh Adamovskyi	Олег Олегович Адамовський	April 2, 2022	gold star	edict	posthumously
587	Yevhen Shamataliuk	Євген Вікторович Шаматалюк	March 26, 2022	gold star	edict
586	Yurii Mykhailiuk	Юрій Володимирович Михайлюк	March 26, 2022	gold star	edict
585	Mykola Liubarets	Микола Олександрович Любарець	March 26, 2022	gold star	edict
584	Artur Kravchenko	Артур Андрійович Кравченко	March 26, 2022	gold star	edict
583	Roman Drohomyretskyi	Роман Юрійович Дрогомирецький	March 26, 2022	gold star	edict
582	Ihor Dykun	Ігор Володимирович Дикун	March 26, 2022	gold star	edict
581	Vitalii Hural	Віталій Олегович Гураль	March 26, 2022	gold star	edict
580	Roman Hryshak	Роман Геннадійович Гришак	March 26, 2022	gold star	edict
579	Ivan Holishevskyi	Іван Леонідович Голішевський	March 26, 2022	gold star	edict
578	Serhii Burkovskyi	Сергій Вікторович Бурковський	March 26, 2022	gold star	edict
577	Serhii Baranovskyi	Сергій Анатолійович Барановський	March 26, 2022	gold star	edict
576	Vladyslav Bandar	Владислав Юрійович Бандар	March 26, 2022	gold star	edict
575	Denys Maksyshko	Денис Костянтинович Максишко	March 26, 2022	gold star	edict	posthumously
574	Serhii Kulyk	Сергій Григорович Кулик	March 26, 2022	gold star	edict	posthumously
573	Bohdan Korniichuk	Богдан Сергійович Корнійчук	March 26, 2022	gold star	edict	posthumously
572	Mukimboi Zhumaboiev	Мукімбой Юнусович Жумабоєв	March 25, 2022	gold star	edict
571	Yevhenii Hromadskyi	Євгеній Олегович Громадський	March 25, 2022	gold star	edict
570	Mykhailo Chuprin	Михайло Русланович Чупрін	March 25, 2022	gold star	edict	posthumously
569	Oleksandr Tymchenko	Олександр Олександрович Тимченко	March 25, 2022	gold star	edict	posthumously
568	Stanislav Partala	Станіслав Юрійович Партала	March 25, 2022	gold star	edict	posthumously
567	Artem Amelin	Артем Андрійович Амелін	March 25, 2022	gold star	edict	posthumously
566	Dmytro Apukhtin	Дмитро Олександрович Апухтін	March 25, 2022	gold star	edict	posthumously
565	Denys Prokopenko	Денис Геннадійович Прокопенко	March 19, 2022	gold star	edict
564	Oleksandr Lutsenko	Олександр Дмитрович Луценко	March 19, 2022	gold star	edict
563	Roman Darmohrai	Роман Анатолійович Дармограй	March 19, 2022	gold star	edict
562	Volodymyr Baraniuk	Володимир Анатолійович Баранюк	March 19, 2022	gold star	edict
561	Andrii Khomenko	Андрій Вікторович Хоменко	March 19, 2022	gold star	edict	posthumously
560	Pavlo Usov	Павло Віталійович Усов	March 19, 2022	gold star	edict	posthumously
559	Stepan Tarabalka	Степан Іванович Тарабалка	March 19, 2022	gold star	edict	posthumously
558	Kateryna Stupnytska	Катерина Вікторівна Ступницька	March 19, 2022	gold star	edict	posthumously
557	Roman Rusnyk	Роман Васильович Русник	March 19, 2022	gold star	edict	posthumously
556	Andrii Norov	Андрій Олексійович Норов	March 19, 2022	gold star	edict	posthumously
555	Mykola Nikonov	Микола Артурович Ніконов	March 19, 2022	gold star	edict	posthumously
554	Oleksandr Labunskyi	Олександр Миколайович Лабунський	March 19, 2022	gold star	edict	posthumously
553	Volodymyr Sydunets	Володимир Володимирович Сидунець	March 16, 2022	gold star	edict
552	Dmytro Dozirchyi	Дмитро Леонідович Дозірчий	March 16, 2022	gold star	edict
551	Pavlo Sbytov	Павло Олегович Сбитов	March 16, 2022	gold star	edict	posthumously
550	Oleksandr Maryniak	Олександр Мирославович Мариняк	March 16, 2022	gold star	edict	posthumously
549	Serhii Kotenko	Сергій Леонідович Котенко	March 16, 2022	gold star	edict	posthumously
548	Valerii Hudz	Валерій Федорович Гудзь	March 16, 2022	gold star	edict	posthumously
547	Volodymyr Black	Володимир Володимирович Чорний	March 12, 2022	gold star	edict
546	Volodymyr Hutsul	Володимир Олександрович Гуцул	March 12, 2022	gold star	edict
545	Andrii Khanin	Андрій Павлович Ханін	March 12, 2022	gold star	edict	posthumously
544	Oleh Svynchuk	Олег Анатолійович Свинчук	March 12, 2022	gold star	edict	posthumously
543	Vitalii Parkhomuk	Віталій Васильович Пархомук	March 12, 2022	gold star	edict	posthumously
542	Kostiantyn Mrochko	Костянтин Васильович Мрочко	March 12, 2022	gold star	edict	posthumously
541	Inna Derusova	Інна Миколаївна Дерусова	March 12, 2022	gold star	edict	posthumously
540	Serhii Vasich	Сергій Вікторович Васіч	March 12, 2022	gold star	edict	posthumously
539	Oleksandr Yakovenko	Олександр Олексійович Яковенко	March 10, 2022	gold star	edict
538	Leonid Khoda	Леонід Олексійович Хода	March 10, 2022	gold star	edict
537	Valerii Samofalov	Валерій Михайлович Самофалов	March 10, 2022	gold star	edict
536	Viacheslav Ponomarenko	В'ячеслав Анатолійович Пономаренко	March 10, 2022	gold star	edict
535	Viktor Nikoliuk	Віктор Дмитрович Ніколюк	March 10, 2022	gold star	edict
534	Oleh Moroz	Олег Романович Мороз	March 10, 2022	gold star	edict
533	Vasyl Boiechko	Василь Васильович Боєчко	March 10, 2022	gold star	edict
532	Yevhenii Bova	Євгеній Петрович Бова	March 10, 2022	gold star	edict
531	Andrii Litun	Андрій Миколайович Літун	March 10, 2022	gold star	edict	posthumously
530	Oleksandr Korpan	Олександр Богданович Корпан	March 10, 2022	gold star	edict	posthumously
529	Andrii Ivashko	Андрій Олександрович Івашко	March 10, 2022	gold star	edict	posthumously
528	Yevhenii Volkov	Євгеній Володимирович Волков	March 10, 2022	gold star	edict	posthumously
527	Yurii Blokha	Юрій Ігорович Блоха	March 10, 2022	gold star	edict	posthumously
526	Oleksandr Pavliuk	Олександр Олексійович Павлюк	March 4, 2022	gold star	edict
525	Dmytro Chavalakh	Дмитро Петрович Чавалах	March 2, 2022	gold star	edict
524	Pavlo Fedosenko	Павло Юрійович Федосенко	March 2, 2022	gold star	edict
523	Vladyslav Prokopenko	Владислав Юрійович Прокопенко	March 2, 2022	gold star	edict
522	Yevhen Palchenko	Євген Михайлович Пальченко	March 2, 2022	gold star	edict
521	Serhii Musienko	Сергій Миколайович Мусієнко	March 2, 2022	gold star	edict
520	Ihor Mykhalchuk	Ігор Васильович Михальчук	March 2, 2022	gold star	edict
519	Denys Dykyi	Денис Леонідович Дикий	March 2, 2022	gold star	edict
518	Stepan Chobanu	Степан Іванович Чобану	March 2, 2022	gold star	edict	posthumously
517	Vladyslav Ukrainets	Владислав Петрович Українець	March 2, 2022	gold star	edict	posthumously
516	Oleksii Seniuk	Олексій Олександрович Сенюк	March 2, 2022	gold star	edict	posthumously
515	Vitalii Sapylo	Віталій Романович Сапило	March 2, 2022	gold star	edict	posthumously
514	Andrii Nikonchuk	Андрій Валерійович Нікончук	March 2, 2022	gold star	edict	posthumously
513	Mykhailo Nesolonyi	Михайло Михайлович Несольоний	March 2, 2022	gold star	edict	posthumously
512	Oleksandr Lukyanovych	Олександр Володимирович Лук’янович	March 2, 2022	gold star	edict	posthumously
511	Oleksandr Kapichun	Олександр Валерійович Капічун	March 2, 2022	gold star	edict	posthumously
510	Maksym Bilokon	Максим Віталійович Білоконь	March 2, 2022	gold star	edict	posthumously
509	Eduard Khoroshun	Едуард Миколайович Хорошун	February 28, 2022	gold star	edict
508	Yurii Sodol	Юрій Іванович Содоль	February 28, 2022	gold star	edict
507	Oleksandr Mostovyi	Олександр Володимирович Мостовий	February 28, 2022	gold star	edict
506	Andrii Kruhlov	Андрій Миколайович Круглов	February 28, 2022	gold star	edict
505	Dmytro Krasylnykov	Дмитро Сергійович Красильников	February 28, 2022	gold star	edict
504	Andrii Herus	Андрій Андрійович Герус	February 28, 2022	gold star	edict
503	Viacheslav Radionov	В’ячеслав Денисович Радіонов	February 28, 2022	gold star	edict	posthumously
502	Oleksandr Oksanchenko	Олександр Якович Оксанченко	February 28, 2022	gold star	edict	posthumously
501	Vitalii Movchan	Віталій Анатолійович Мовчан	February 28, 2022	gold star	edict	posthumously
500	Hennadii Matuliak	Геннадій Васильович Матуляк	February 28, 2022	gold star	edict	posthumously
499	Dmytro Kolomiiets	Дмитро Валерійович Коломієць	February 28, 2022	gold star	edict	posthumously
498	Eduard Vahorovskyi	Едуард Миколайович Вагоровський	February 28, 2022	gold star	edict	posthumously
497	Vitalii Skakun	Віталій Володимирович Скакун	February 26, 2022	gold star	edict	posthumously

== 2021 ==
Total number of awards: 17.

N	English name	Ukrainian name	Conferment date	Distinction	Link	Notes
496	Leonid Kindzelsky	Кіндзельський Леонід Петрович	December 14, 2021	order of state	edict	posthumously
495	Pavlo Pivovarenko	Півоваренко Павло Васильович	December 10, 2021	gold star	edict	posthumously
494	Ihor Poklad	Поклад Ігор Дмитрович	December 9, 2021	order of state	edict
493	Petro Polytsyak	Полицяк Петро Петрович	December 3, 2021	gold star	edict	posthumously
492	Dmytro Kotsyubaylo	Коцюбайло Дмитро Іванович	November 30, 2021	gold star	edict
491	Rustam Khamraev	Хамраєв Рустам Шонійозович	October 14, 2021	gold star	edict	posthumously
490	Mykola Verkhohlyad	Верхогляд Микола Якович	October 14, 2021	gold star	edict	posthumously
489	Ilya Levitas	Левітас Ілля Михайлович	September 29, 2021	order of state	edict	posthumously
488	Maksym Krypak	Крипак Максим Сергійович	September 16, 2021	order of state	edict
487	Viktor Hurniak	Гурняк Віктор Петрович	August 28, 2021	gold star	edict	posthumously
486	Svyatoslav Gorbenko	Горбенко Святослав Сергійович	August 28, 2021	gold star	edict	posthumously
485	Ilya Gelfgat	Гельфгат Ілля Маркович	August 22, 2021	order of state	edict
484	Volodymyr Horbulin	Горбулін Володимир Павлович	August 22, 2021	gold star	edict
483	Nazariy Yaremchuk	Яремчук Назарій Назарович	August 22, 2021	order of state	edict	posthumously
482	Yevhen Sidorenko	Сидоренко Євген Анатолійович	August 22, 2021	gold star	edict
481	Maksym Rydzanych	Ридзанич Максим Володимирович	August 22, 2021	gold star	edict	posthumously
480	Bilous Stepanovich	Степанович Білоус Сергій	August 22, 2021	gold star	edict	posthumously

== 2020 ==
Total number of awards: 22.

N	English name	Ukrainian name	Conferment date	Distinction	Link	Notes
479	Serhiy Khomenko	Хоменко Сергій Анатолійович	December 29, 2020	gold star	edict	posthumously
478	Kateryna Statnik	Статнік Катерина Олегівна	December 29, 2020	gold star	edict	posthumously
477	Yuliia Solohub	Сологуб Юлія Миколаївна	December 29, 2020	gold star	edict	posthumously
476	Valeriia Ovcharuk	Овчарук Валерія Євгеніївна	December 29, 2020	gold star	edict	posthumously
475	Oleksii Naumkin	Наумкін Олексій Євгенович	December 29, 2020	gold star	edict	posthumously
474	Mariia Mykytiuk	Микитюк Марія Михайлівна	December 29, 2020	gold star	edict	posthumously
473	Ihor Matkov	Матьков Ігор Валерійович	December 29, 2020	gold star	edict	posthumously
472	Denys Lykhno	Лихно Денис Михайлович	December 29, 2020	gold star	edict	posthumously
471	Volodymyr Haponenko	Гапоненко Володимир Іванович	December 29, 2020	gold star	edict	posthumously
470	Ihor Filipchuk	Філіпчук Ігор Ярославович	December 3, 2020	gold star	edict	posthumously
469	Oleksandr Dehtiarev	Дегтярев Олександр Вікторович	November 27, 2020	order of state	edict	posthumously
468	Eduard Atrashkevych	Атрашкевич Едуард Юрійович	October 20, 2020	gold star	edict
467	Yurii Horaiskyi	Горайський Юрій Володимирович	September 15, 2020	gold star	edict	posthumously
466	Yurii Rybchynskyi	Рибчинський Юрій Євгенович	August 22, 2020	order of state	edict
465	Oleh Korostelyov	Коростельов Олег Петрович	August 22, 2020	order of state	edict
464	Viacheslav Kubrak	Кубрак В'ячеслав Анатолійович	August 22, 2020	gold star	edict	posthumously
463	Andriy Kuzmenko	Кузьменко Андрій Вікторович	August 17, 2020	order of state	edict	posthumously
462	Taras Matviiv	Матвіїв Тарас Тарасович	July 13, 2020	gold star	edict	posthumously
461	Serhii Hubanov	Губанов Сергій Леонідович	May 21, 2020	gold star	edict	posthumously
460	Serhii Mykhalchuk	Михальчук Сергій Олександрович	March 25, 2020	gold star	edict	posthumously
459	Serhii Shatokhin	Шатохін Сергій Миколайович	January 25, 2020	gold star	edict	posthumously
458	Hanna Bortiuk	Бортюк Ганна Леонідівна	January 25, 2020	gold star	edict	posthumously

== 2019 ==
Total number of awards: 14.

N	English name	Ukrainian name	Conferment date	Distinction	Link	Notes
457	Roman Matviiets	Матвієць Роман Михайлович	December 5, 2019	gold star	edict	posthumously
456	Andrii Zhuk	Жук Андрій Сергійович	December 4, 2019	gold star	edict	posthumously
455	Dmytro Kaplunov	Каплунов Дмитро Віталійович	December 3, 2019	gold star	edict	posthumously
454	Denys Volochaiev	Волочаєв Денис Олександрович	December 3, 2019	gold star	edict	posthumously
453	Borys Baranov	Баранов Борис Олександрович	June 27, 2019	gold star	edict	posthumously
452	Valerii Bespalov	Беспалов Валерій Олексійович	June 27, 2019	gold star	edict
451	Oleksii Ananenko	Ананенко Олексій Михайлович	June 27, 2019	gold star	edict
450	Andrii Volos	Волос Андрій Олександрович	June 27, 2019	gold star	edict	posthumously
449	Vasyl Hrytsak	Грицак Василь Сергійович	May 9, 2019	gold star	edict
448	Dmytro Honcharenko	Гончаренко Дмитро Валерійович	May 9, 2019	gold star	edict	posthumously
447	Andrii Sokolenko	Соколенко Андрій Аполлінарійович	May 9, 2019	gold star	edict	posthumously
446	Ihor Momot	Момот Ігор Федорович	April 29, 2019	gold star	edict	posthumously
445	Ivan Vinnik	Віннік Іван Іванович	March 6, 2019	gold star	edict
444	Filaret (Denysenko)	Філарет (Денисенко Михайло Антонович)	January 8, 2019	order of state	edict

== 2018 ==
Total number of awards: 4.

N	English name	Ukrainian name	Conferment date	Distinction	Link	Notes
443	Andrii Konoplyov	Конопльов Андрій Анатолійович	December 12, 2018	gold star	edict	posthumously
442	Volodymyr Sosnin	Соснін Володимир Миколайович	August 23, 2018	gold star	edict
441	Oleh Dovhyi	Довгий Олег Іванович	August 23, 2018	gold star	edict	posthumously
440	Yevhenii Pikus	Пікус Євгеній Михайлович	April 26, 2018	gold star	edict	posthumously

== 2017 ==
Total number of awards: 10.

N	English name	Ukrainian name	Conferment date	Distinction	Link	Notes
439	Oleksandr Kapush	Капуш Олександр Васильович	October 12, 2017	gold star	edict	posthumously
438	Maksym Shapoval	Шаповал Максим Михайлович	September 7, 2017	gold star	edict	posthumously
437	Vasyl Tarasiuk	Тарасюк Василь Олександрович	August 23, 2017	gold star	edict
436	Yevhen Loskot	Лоскот Євген Олександрович	August 23, 2017	gold star	edict	posthumously
435	Mikhail Zhyzneuski	Жизневський Михайло Михайлович	June 13, 2017	gold star	edict	posthumously
434	Reşat Amet	Аметов Решат Медатович	May 18, 2017	gold star	edict	posthumously
433	Yevhenii Telnov	Тельнов Євгеній Львович	March 27, 2017	gold star	edict	posthumously
432	Vasyl Slipak	Сліпак Василь Ярославович	February 20, 2017	gold star	edict	posthumously
431	Andrii Kyzylo	Кизило Андрій Олександрович	February 1, 2017	gold star	edict	posthumously
430	Volodymyr Zhemchuhov	Жемчугов Володимир Павлович	January 21, 2017	gold star	edict

== 2016 ==
Total number of awards: 12.

N	English name	Ukrainian name	Conferment date	Distinction	Link	Notes
429	Mykyta Yarovyi	Яровий Микита Олександрович	December 30, 2016	gold star	edict	posthumously
428	Serhii Tabala	Табала Сергій Олександрович	November 21, 2016	gold star	edict	posthumously
427	Andrii Snitko	Снітко Андрій Володимирович	November 21, 2016	gold star	edict	posthumously
426	Andrii Tkachuk	Ткачук Андрій Сергійович	October 13, 2016	gold star	edict
425	Volodymyr Harmatii	Гарматій Володимир Михайлович	October 13, 2016	gold star	edict	posthumously
424	Oleksandr Lavrenko	Лавренко Олександр Миколайович	September 9, 2016	gold star	edict	posthumously
423	Serhii Kolodii	Колодій Сергій Володимирович	August 23, 2016	gold star	edict	posthumously
422	Ihor Branovytskyi	Брановицький Ігор Євгенович	August 23, 2016	gold star	edict	posthumously
421	Valerii Chybinieiev	Чибінєєв Валерій Вікторович	August 23, 2016	gold star	edict
420	Andrii Kovalchuk	Ковальчук Андрій Трохимович	August 23, 2016	gold star	edict
419	Viacheslav Semenov	Семенов Вячеслав Анатолійович	March 11, 2016	gold star	edict	posthumously
418	Viktor Orlenko	Орленко Віктор Миколайович	February 17, 2016	gold star	edict	posthumously

== 2015 ==
Total number of awards: 21.

N	English name	Ukrainian name	Conferment date	Distinction	Link	Notes
417	Serhii Tsymbal	Цимбал Сергій Володимирович	November 13, 2015	gold star	edict	posthumously
416	Yevhen Mezhevikin	Межевікін Євген Миколайович	October 14, 2015	gold star	edict
415	Vasyl Bozhok	Божок Василь Миколайович	October 14, 2015	gold star	edict
414	Ihor Zinych	Зінич Ігор Вікторович	October 14, 2015	gold star	edict	posthumously
413	Oleh Mikhniyk	Міхнюк Олег Іванович	August 21, 2015	gold star	edict	posthumously
412	Ivan Zubkov	Зубков Іван Іванович	June 9, 2015	gold star	edict	posthumously
411	Yury Kovalenko	Коваленко Юрій Вікторович	March 31, 2015	gold star	edict	posthumously
410	Volodymyr Hryniuk	Гринюк Володимир Володимирович	March 23, 2015	gold star	edict
409	Oleksandr Porkhun	Порхун Олександр Володимирович	March 23, 2015	gold star	edict
408	Serhii Sobko	Собко Сергій Станіславович	March 23, 2015	gold star	edict
407	Vasyl Zubanych	Зубанич Василь Іванович	March 23, 2015	gold star	edict
406	Nadiya Savchenko	Савченко Надія Вікторівна	March 3, 2015	gold star	edict
405	Dmytro Cherniavskyi	Чернявський Дмитро Олександрович	February 20, 2015	gold star	edict	posthumously
404	Volodymyr Rybak	Рибак Володимир Іванович	February 20, 2015	gold star	edict	posthumously
403	Yurii Popravka	Поправка Юрій Юрійович	February 20, 2015	gold star	edict	posthumously
402	Yurii Diakovskyi	Дяковський Юрій Іванович	February 20, 2015	gold star	edict	posthumously
401	Oleksandr Badera	Бадера Олександр Миколайович	February 20, 2015	gold star	edict	posthumously
400	Serhiy Shaptala	Шаптала Сергій Олександрович	February 18, 2015	gold star	edict
399	Oleksandr Trepak	Трепак Олександр Сергійович	February 12, 2015	gold star	edict
398	Ihor Herasymenko	Герасименко Ігор Леонідович	February 12, 2015	gold star	edict
397	Oleksandr Anishchenko	Аніщенко Олександр Григорович	January 2, 2015	gold star	edict	posthumously

== 2014 ==
Total number of awards: 110.

N	English name	Ukrainian name	Conferment date	Distinction	Link	Notes
396	Oleksandr Petrakivskyi	Петраківський Олександр Петрович	December 4, 2014	gold star	edict
395	Dmytro Maiboroda	Майборода Дмитро Олександрович	December 4, 2014	gold star	edict	posthumously
394	Serhii Kryvonosov	Кривоносов Сергій Сергійович	December 4, 2014	gold star	edict	posthumously
393	Oleksandr Shcherbaniuk	Щербанюк Олександр Миколайович	November 21, 2014	gold star	edict	posthumously
392	Maksym Shymko	Шимко Максим Миколайович	November 21, 2014	gold star	edict	posthumously
391	Yosyp Shylinh	Шилінг Йосип Михайлович	November 21, 2014	gold star	edict	posthumously
390	Vasyl Sheremet	Шеремет Василь Олександрович	November 21, 2014	gold star	edict	posthumously
389	Liudmyla Sheremet	Шеремет Людмила Олександрівна	November 21, 2014	gold star	edict	posthumously
388	Viktor Shvets	Швець Віктор Миколайович	November 21, 2014	gold star	edict	posthumously
387	Serhii Shapoval	Шаповал Сергій Борисович	November 21, 2014	gold star	edict	posthumously
386	Viktor Chmilenko	Чміленко Віктор Іванович	November 21, 2014	gold star	edict	posthumously
385	Viktor Chernets	Чернець Віктор Григорович	November 21, 2014	gold star	edict	posthumously
384	Andrii Chernenko	Черненко Андрій Миколайович	November 21, 2014	gold star	edict	posthumously
383	Volodymyr Chaplinskyi	Чаплінський Володимир Володимирович	November 21, 2014	gold star	edict	posthumously
382	Andrii Tsepun	Цепун Андрій Михайлович	November 21, 2014	gold star	edict	posthumously
381	Oleksandr Tsarok	Царьок Олександр Миколайович	November 21, 2014	gold star	edict	posthumously
380	Oleksandr Khrapachenko	Храпаченко Олександр Володимирович	November 21, 2014	gold star	edict	posthumously
379	Viktor Khomiak	Хомяк Віктор Борисович	November 21, 2014	gold star	edict	posthumously
378	Oleh Ushnevych	Ушневич Олег Михайлович	November 21, 2014	gold star	edict	posthumously
377	Roman Tochyn	Точин Роман Петрович	November 21, 2014	gold star	edict	posthumously
376	Volodymyr Topii	Топій Володимир Петрович	November 21, 2014	gold star	edict	posthumously
375	Ihor Tkachuk	Ткачук Ігор Михайлович	November 21, 2014	gold star	edict	posthumously
374	Ivan Tarasiuk	Тарасюк Іван Миколайович	November 21, 2014	gold star	edict	posthumously
373	Bohdan Solchanyk	Сольчаник Богдан Зіновійович	November 21, 2014	gold star	edict	posthumously
372	Vitalii Smolenskyi	Смоленський Віталій Віталійович	November 21, 2014	gold star	edict	posthumously
371	Taras Slobodian	Слободян Тарас Ігорович	November 21, 2014	gold star	edict	posthumously
370	Serhii Synenko	Синенко Сергій Петрович	November 21, 2014	gold star	edict	posthumously
369	Yurii Sydorchuk	Сидорчук Юрій Володимирович	November 21, 2014	gold star	edict	posthumously
368	Ihor Serdiuk	Сердюк Ігор Миколайович	November 21, 2014	gold star	edict	posthumously
367	Vasyl Serhiienko	Сергієнко Василь Миколайович	November 21, 2014	gold star	edict	posthumously
366	Roman Senyk	Сеник Роман Федорович	November 21, 2014	gold star	edict	posthumously
365	Andrii Saienko	Саєнко Андрій Степанович	November 21, 2014	gold star	edict	posthumously
364	Viktor Prokhorchuk	Прохорчук Віктор Олександрович	November 21, 2014	gold star	edict	posthumously
363	Vasyl Prokhorskyi	Прохорський Василь Петрович	November 21, 2014	gold star	edict	posthumously
362	Leonid Polianskyi	Полянський Леонід Петрович	November 21, 2014	gold star	edict	posthumously
361	Andrii Pozniak	Позняк Андрій Анатолійович	November 21, 2014	gold star	edict	posthumously
360	Oleksandr Podryhun	Подригун Олександр Володимирович	November 21, 2014	gold star	edict	posthumously
359	Oleksandr Plekhanov	Плеханов Олександр Вікторович	November 21, 2014	gold star	edict	posthumously
358	Ihor Pekhenko	Пехенько Ігор Олександрович	November 21, 2014	gold star	edict	posthumously
357	Yurii Paskhalin	Пасхалін Юрій Олександрович	November 21, 2014	gold star	edict	posthumously
356	Yurii Parashchuk	Паращук Юрій Григорович	November 21, 2014	gold star	edict	posthumously
355	Mykola Pankiv	Паньків Микола Олександрович	November 21, 2014	gold star	edict	posthumously
354	Ivan Pantelieiev	Пантелєєв Іван Миколайович	November 21, 2014	gold star	edict	posthumously
353	Dmytrii Pahor	Пагор Дмитрій Олексійович	November 21, 2014	gold star	edict	posthumously
352	Valerii Opanasiuk	Опанасюк Валерій Адамович	November 21, 2014	gold star	edict	posthumously
351	Serhii Nihoian	Нігоян Сергій Гагікович	November 21, 2014	gold star	edict	posthumously
350	Anatolii Nechyporenko	Нечипоренко Анатолій Ілліч	November 21, 2014	gold star	edict	posthumously
349	Volodymyr Naumov	Наумов Володимир Григорович	November 21, 2014	gold star	edict	posthumously
348	Ivan Nakonechnyi	Наконечний Іван Максимович	November 21, 2014	gold star	edict	posthumously
347	Vasyl Moisei	Мойсей Василь Михайлович	November 21, 2014	gold star	edict	posthumously
346	Andrii Movchan	Мовчан Андрій Сергійович	November 21, 2014	gold star	edict	posthumously
345	Volodymyr Melnychuk	Мельничук Володимир Валерійович	November 21, 2014	gold star	edict	posthumously
344	Dmytro Maksymov	Максимов Дмитро Вячеславович	November 21, 2014	gold star	edict	posthumously
343	Pavlo Mazurenko	Мазуренко Павло Анатолійович	November 21, 2014	gold star	edict	posthumously
342	Artem Mazur	Мазур Артем Анатолійович	November 21, 2014	gold star	edict	posthumously
341	Volodymyr Kulchytskyi	Кульчицький Володимир Станіславович	November 21, 2014	gold star	edict	posthumously
340	Vitalii Kotsiuba	Коцюба Віталій Миколайович	November 21, 2014	gold star	edict	posthumously
339	Yevhen Kotliar	Котляр Євген Миколайович	November 21, 2014	gold star	edict	posthumously
338	Mykhailo Kostyshyn	Костишин Михайло Йосипович	November 21, 2014	gold star	edict	posthumously
337	Ihor Kostenko	Костенко Ігор Ігорович	November 21, 2014	gold star	edict	posthumously
336	Andrii Korchak	Корчак Андрій Богданович	November 21, 2014	gold star	edict	posthumously
335	Anatolii Kornieiev	Корнєєв Анатолій Петрович	November 21, 2014	gold star	edict	posthumously
334	Oleksandr Klitynskyi	Клітинський Олександр Іванович	November 21, 2014	gold star	edict	posthumously
333	Volodymyr Kishchuk	Кіщук Володимир Юрійович	November 21, 2014	gold star	edict	posthumously
332	Serhii Kemskyi	Кемський Сергій Олександрович	November 21, 2014	gold star	edict	posthumously
331	Oleksandr Kapinos	Капінос Олександр Анатолійович	November 21, 2014	gold star	edict	posthumously
330	Bohdan Kalyniak	Калиняк Богдан Михайлович	November 21, 2014	gold star	edict	posthumously
329	Bohdan Ilkiv	Ільків Богдан Іванович	November 21, 2014	gold star	edict	posthumously
328	Vladyslav Zubenko	Зубенко Владислав Віталійович	November 21, 2014	gold star	edict	posthumously
327	Yakiv Zaiko	Зайко Яків Якович	November 21, 2014	gold star	edict	posthumously
326	Volodymyr Zherebnyi	Жеребний Володимир Миколайович	November 21, 2014	gold star	edict	posthumously
325	Anatolii Zhalovaha	Жаловага Анатолій Григорович	November 21, 2014	gold star	edict	posthumously
324	Ihor Dmytriv	Дмитрів Ігор Федорович	November 21, 2014	gold star	edict	posthumously
323	Serhii Didych	Дідич Сергій Васильович	November 21, 2014	gold star	edict	posthumously
322	Andrii Dyhdalovych	Дигдалович Андрій Іванович	November 21, 2014	gold star	edict	posthumously
321	Mykola Dziavulskyi	Дзявульський Микола Степанович	November 21, 2014	gold star	edict	posthumously
320	Antonina Dvoryanets	Дворянець Антоніна Григорівна	November 21, 2014	gold star	edict	posthumously
319	Roman Huryk	Гурик Роман Ігорович	November 21, 2014	gold star	edict	posthumously
318	Eduard Hrynevych	Гриневич Едуард Михайлович	November 21, 2014	gold star	edict	posthumously
317	Maksym Horoshyshyn	Горошишин Максим Максимович	November 21, 2014	gold star	edict	posthumously
316	Ivan Horodniuk	Городнюк Іван Володимирович	November 21, 2014	gold star	edict	posthumously
315	Ustym Holodniuk	Голоднюк Устим Володимирович	November 21, 2014	gold star	edict	posthumously
314	Petro Hadzha	Гаджа Петро Миронович	November 21, 2014	gold star	edict	posthumously
313	Viacheslav Vorona	Ворона В'ячеслав Миколайович	November 21, 2014	gold star	edict	posthumously
312	Nazarii Voitovych	Войтович Назарій Юрійович	November 21, 2014	gold star	edict	posthumously
311	Viacheslav Veremii	Веремій В'ячеслав Васильович	November 21, 2014	gold star	edict	posthumously
310	Yurii Verbytskyi	Вербицький Юрій Тарасович	November 21, 2014	gold star	edict	posthumously
309	Vitalii Vasiltsov	Васільцов Віталій Валерійович	November 21, 2014	gold star	edict	posthumously
308	Roman Varenytsia	Варениця Роман Михайлович	November 21, 2014	gold star	edict	posthumously
307	Bohdan Vaida	Вайда Богдан Іванович	November 21, 2014	gold star	edict	posthumously
306	Olha Bura	Бура Ольга Василівна	November 21, 2014	gold star	edict	posthumously
305	Valerii Brezdeniuk	Брезденюк Валерій Олександрович	November 21, 2014	gold star	edict	posthumously
304	Oleksii Bratushka	Братушка Олексій Сергійович	November 21, 2014	gold star	edict	posthumously
303	Serhii Bondarchuk	Бондарчук Сергій Михайлович	November 21, 2014	gold star	edict	posthumously
302	Serhii Bondarev	Бондарев Сергій Анатолійович	November 21, 2014	gold star	edict	posthumously
301	Volodymyr Boikiv	Бойків Володимир Васильович	November 21, 2014	gold star	edict	posthumously
300	Ivan Blok	Бльок Іван Іванович	November 21, 2014	gold star	edict	posthumously
299	Ihor Bachynskyi	Бачинський Ігор Володимирович	November 21, 2014	gold star	edict	posthumously
298	Oleksandr Baliuk	Балюк Олександр Олександрович	November 21, 2014	gold star	edict	posthumously
297	Serhii Baidovskyi	Байдовський Сергій Романович	November 21, 2014	gold star	edict	posthumously
296	Heorhii Arutiunian	Арутюнян Георгій Вагаршакович	November 21, 2014	gold star	edict	posthumously
295	Vasyl Aksenyn	Аксенин Василь Степанович	November 21, 2014	gold star	edict	posthumously
294	Ruslan Luzhevskyi	Лужевський Руслан Михайлович	November 3, 2014	gold star	edict	posthumously
293	Ihor Hordiichuk	Гордійчук Ігор Володимирович	October 21, 2014	gold star	edict
292	Yevhen Zelenskyi	Зеленський Євген Олександрович	August 23, 2014	gold star	edict	posthumously
291	Mykhailo Zabrodksyi	Забродський Михайло Віталійович	August 23, 2014	gold star	edict
290	Bohdan Zavada	Завада Богдан Олексійович	July 19, 2014	gold star	edict	posthumously
289	Taras Seniuk	Сенюк Тарас Михайлович	June 20, 2014	gold star	edict	posthumously
288	Kostiantyn Mohylko	Могилко Костянтин Вікторович	June 20, 2014	gold star	edict	posthumously
287	Serhiy Kulchytskyi	Кульчицький Сергій Петрович	June 20, 2014	gold star	edict	posthumously

== 2013 ==
Total number of awards: 11.

N	English name	Ukrainian name	Conferment date	Distinction	Link	Notes
286	Mykhailo Reznikovych	Резнікович Михайло Ієрухімович	August 24, 2013	order of state	edict
285	Stanislav Povazhnyi	Поважний Станіслав Федорович	August 24, 2013	order of state	edict
284	Borys Deich	Дейч Борис Давидович	August 24, 2013	order of state	edict
283	Leonid Shyman	Шиман Леонід Миколайович	August 24, 2013	order of state	edict
282	Mykola Matrunchyk	Матрунчик Микола Іванович	August 24, 2013	order of state	edict
281	Ivan Borymskyi	Боримський Іван Арсеньович	August 24, 2013	order of state	edict
280	Viktor Remnov	Ремньов Віктор Володимирович	August 22, 2013	order of state	edict
279	Volodymyr Pryz	Приз Володимир Олексійович	August 22, 2013	order of state	edict
278	Serhii Obukhov	Обухов Сергій Іванович	August 22, 2013	order of state	edict
277	Oleksandr Mokrynskykh	Мокринських Олександр Михайлович	August 22, 2013	order of state	edict
276	Oleksandr Bohdanov	Богданов Олександр Миколайович	August 22, 2013	order of state	edict

== 2012 ==
Total number of awards: 10.

N	English name	Ukrainian name	Conferment date	Distinction	Link	Notes
275	Yurii Shykula	Шикула Юрій Юрійович	August 24, 2012	order of state	edict
274	Serhii Chervonopyskyi	Червонописький Сергій Васильович	August 24, 2012	order of state	edict
273	Serhii Sliusar	Слюсарь Сергій Павлович	August 24, 2012	order of state	edict
272	Dmytro Romanenko	Романенко Дмитро Васильович	August 24, 2012	order of state	edict
271	Oleksandr Minaiev	Мінаєв Олександр Анатолійович	August 24, 2012	order of state	edict
270	Mykhailo Korolenko	Короленко Михайло Костянтинович	August 24, 2012	order of state	edict
269	Valeriia Zaklunna-Myronenko	Заклунна-Мироненко Валерія Гавриїлівна	August 24, 2012	order of state	edict
268	Oleksandr Holubenko	Голубенко Олександр Леонідович	August 24, 2012	order of state	edict
267	Petro Gadz	Гадз Петро Іванович	August 24, 2012	order of state	edict
266	Oleksandr Batalin	Баталін Олександр Сергійович	August 24, 2012	order of state	edict	Annulled (Note: Annulled on 22 November 2024 in accordance with law 4074-IX, which deprived all state awards, including the title of Hero of Ukraine, of those deemed by the National Security and Defense Council and Volodymyr Zelenskyy as having supported Russia's aggression against Ukraine.)

== 2011 ==
Total number of awards: 11.

N	English name	Ukrainian name	Conferment date	Distinction	Link	Notes
265	Oleksandr Odnoralenko	Олександр Анатолійович Однораленко	August 25, 2011	order of state	edict	Annulled (Note: Annulled on 19 January 2025 in accordance with Decree No. 38/2025, which deprived all state awards, including the title of Hero of Ukraine, of those deemed by the National Security and Defense Council and Volodymyr Zelenskyy as having supported Russia's aggression against Ukraine.)
264	Serhii Lazurenko	Сергій Іванович Лазуренко	August 25, 2011	order of state	edict
263	Viktor Koshelnyk	Віктор Андрійович Кошельник	August 25, 2011	order of state	edict
262	Larysa Shytykova	Лариса Олександрівна Шитикова	August 23, 2011	order of state	edict
261	Serhii Troshyn	Сергій Михайлович Трошин	August 23, 2011	gold star	edict
260	Bohdan Stupka	Богдан Сильвестрович Ступка	August 23, 2011	order of state	edict
259	Mykola Stepanenko	Микола Семенович Степаненко	August 23, 2011	order of state	edict
258	Borys Rybalko	Борис Андрійович Рибалко	August 23, 2011	order of state	edict
257	Oleksandr Kliuchnykov	Олександр Олександрович Ключников	August 23, 2011	order of state	edict
256	Borys Bilash	Борис Федорович Білаш	August 23, 2011	order of state	edict
255	Volodymyr Sabodan	Володимир (Віктор Маркіянович Сабодан)	July 9, 2011	order of state	edict

== 2010 ==
Total number of awards: 11. Some of the awards have come into question. See Hero of Ukraine: Controversial awards for more details.

N	English name	Ukrainian name	Conferment date	Distinction	Link	Notes
254	Ivan Shevchenko	Іван Петрович Шевченко	August 26, 2010	gold star	edict
253	Serhii Shemuk	Сергій Олександрович Шемук	August 26, 2010	gold star	edict
252	Ihor Yurchenko	Ігор Григорійович Юрченко	August 26, 2010	gold star	edict
251	Mykhailo Shapoval	Михайло Васильович Шаповал	August 21, 2010	order of state	edict
250	Oleksandr Ryzhenkov	Олександр Миколайович Риженков	August 21, 2010	order of state	edict
249	Volodymyr Volikov	Володимир Миколайович Воліков	August 21, 2010	gold star	edict
248	Olha Basystiuk-Haptar	Ольга Іванівна Басистюк-Гаптар	August 21, 2010	order of state	edict
247	Viktor Bariakhtar	Віктор Григорович Бар'яхтар	August 21, 2010	order of state	edict
246	Serhii Bondarchuk	Сергій Васильович Бондарчук	February 18, 2010	order of state	edict
245	Hryhorii Omelchenko	Григорій Омелянович Омельченко	February 8, 2010	order of state	edict
244	Stepan Bandera	Степан Андрійович Бандера	January 20, 2010	order of state	edict	posthumously; annulled January 2011; see details

== 2009 ==
Total number of awards: 27.

N	English name	Ukrainian name	Conferment date	Distinction	Link	Notes
243	Mykhailo Zubets	Михайло Васильович Зубець	December 16, 2009	order of state	edict
242	Valentyn Symonenko	Валентин Костянтинович Симоненко	December 3, 2009	order of state	edict
241	Volodymyr Chernyshenko	Володимир Ілліч Чернишенко	November 23, 2009	order of state	edict
240	Vira Naydyonova	Віра Опанасівна Найдьонова	November 23, 2009	order of state	edict
239	Yurii Melnyk	Юрій Федорович Мельник	November 23, 2009	order of state	edict
238	Ivan Huta	Іван Миколайович Гута	November 23, 2009	order of state	edict
237	Hennadii Bobov	Геннадій Борисович Бобов	November 23, 2009	order of state	edict
236	Leonid Huberskyi	Леонід Васильович Губерський	October 27, 2009	order of state	edict
235	Dmytro Kiva	Дмитро Семенович Ківа	August 21, 2009	order of state	edict
234	Liudmyla Liatetska	Людмила Володимирівна Лятецька	August 21, 2009	order of state	edict
233	Petro Shyliuk	Петро Степанович Шилюк	August 21, 2009	order of state	edict
232	Anastasiya Kobzarenko	Анастасія Степанівна Кобзаренко	August 19, 2009	order of state	edict
231	Yevhen Savchuk	Євген Герасимович Савчук	August 19, 2009	order of state	edict
230	Ihor Pasichnyk	Ігор Демидович Пасічник	August 19, 2009	order of state	edict
229	Tetiana Balahura	Тетяна Іванівна Балагура	August 19, 2009	order of state	edict
228	Oleksandr Mostipan	Олександр Олексійович Мостіпан	August 19, 2009	order of state	edict
227	Mykola Boiko	Микола Костянтинович Бойко	August 19, 2009	order of state	edict	Temporarily annulled (Note: In 2018, sanctions were placed on him by Ukraine which temporarily deprived him of all his state awards for a period of three years, although this could be renewed by the president in a new decree. It was renewed in 2021.)
226	Stanislav Voitovych	Станіслав Андрійович Войтович	August 19, 2009	order of state	edict
225	Vasyl Zinkevych	Василь Іванович Зінкевич	August 19, 2009	order of state	edict
224	Anatoliy Palamarenko	Анатолій Несторович Паламаренко	July 12, 2009	order of state	edict
223	Oleksii Poroshenko	Олексій Іванович Порошенко	June 23, 2009	order of state	edict
222	Yurii Karasyk	Юрій Михайлович Карасик	June 23, 2009	order of state	edict
221	Pavlo Muravskyi	Павло Іванович Муравський	March 23, 2009	order of state	edict
220	Yuriy Mushketyk	Юрій (Георгій) Михайлович Мушкетик	March 20, 2009	order of state	edict
219	Volodymyr Ivasyuk	Володимир Михайлович Івасюк	March 20, 2009	order of state	edict	posthumously
218	Yevhen Stankovych	Євген Федорович Станкович	January 16, 2009	order of state	edict
217	Roman Ivanychuk	Роман Іванович Іваничук	January 16, 2009	order of state	edict

== 2008 ==
Total number of awards: 18.

N	English name	Ukrainian name	Conferment date	Distinction	Link	Notes
216	Hryhory Kytasty	Григорій Трохимович Китастий	November 25, 2008	order of state	edict	posthumously
215	Mykhailo Zhar	Михайло Васильович Жар	November 24, 2008	order of state	edict
214	Andrii Rovchak	Андрій Яковлевич Ровчак	November 10, 2008	order of state	edict
213	Alla Kovalenko	Алла Арестівна Коваленко	October 16, 2008	order of state	edict
212	Valerii Sushkevych	Валерій Михайлович Сушкевич	October 13, 2008	order of state	edict
211	Volodymyr Makarov	Володимир Іванович Макаров	August 27, 2008	order of state	edict
210	Borys Hriadushchyi	Борис Абрамович Грядущий	August 27, 2008	order of state	edict
209	Valerii Hrechushkin	Валерій Вікторович Гречушкін	August 27, 2008	order of state	edict
208	Myroslav Skoryk	Мирослав Михайлович Скорик	August 20, 2008	order of state	edict
207	Ivan Hulyi	Іван Михайлович Гулий	August 20, 2008	order of state	edict
206	Yuriy Kosiuk	Юрій Анатолійович Косюк	August 20, 2008	order of state	edict
205	Nila Kriukova	Ніла Валеріївна Крюкова	August 20, 2008	order of state	edict
204	Viktor Dzenzerskyi	Віктор Олександрович Дзензерський	August 20, 2008	order of state	edict
203	Volodymyr Khorishko	Володимир Дмитрович Хорішко	August 20, 2008	order of state	edict
202	Mariia Stefiuk	Марія Юріївна Стеф'юк	July 3, 2008	order of state	edict
201	Anatolii Solovianenko	Анатолій Борисович Солов'яненко	July 3, 2008	order of state	edict	posthumously
200	Volodymyr Morhun	Володимир Васильович Моргун	March 7, 2008	order of state	edict
199	Valerii Kazakov	Валерій Миколайович Казаков	January 14, 2008	order of state	edict

== 2007 ==
Total number of awards: 25. Some of the awards have come into question. See Hero of Ukraine: Controversial awards for more details.

N	English name	Ukrainian name	Conferment date	Distinction	Link	Notes
198	Vasyl Ivchuk	Василь Якович Івчук	November 21, 2007	order of state	edict	posthumously
197	Taras Shevchenko	Тарас Григорович Шевченко	November 21, 2007	order of state	edict
196	Ivan Palii	Іван Єгорович Палій	November 21, 2007	order of state	edict
195	Oleksii Vadaturskyi	Олексій Опанасович Вадатурський	November 15, 2007	order of state	edict
194	Roman Shukhevych	Роман Йосипович Шухевич	October 12, 2007	order of state	edict	posthumously; see details
193	Yurii Hrechykha	Юрій Михайлович Гречиха	September 10, 2007	order of state	edict
192	Serhiy Bystrov	Сергій Іванович Бистров	August 23, 2007	order of state	edict
191	Serhiy Rudenko	Сергій Євсейович Руденко	August 23, 2007	order of state	edict
190	Oleg Kryzhovachuk	Олег Петрович Крижовачук	August 23, 2007	order of state	edict
189	Mykola Bahrov	Микола Васильович Багров	August 21, 2007	order of state	edict
188	Mykola Romanchuk	Микола Павлович Романчук	August 21, 2007	order of state	edict
187	Volodymyr Stelmakh	Володимир Семенович Стельмах	August 21, 2007	order of state	edict
186	Georgiy Beresovsky	Георгій Васильович Березовський	August 21, 2007	order of state	edict
185	Ivan Balyuk	Іван Махтейович Балюк	August 21, 2007	order of state	edict
184	Borys Litvak	Борис Давидович Лiтвак	August 21, 2007	order of state	edict
183	Gennadiy Voronovsky	Геннадій Кирилович Вороновський	August 21, 2007	order of state	edict
182	Ada Rohovtseva	Ада Миколаївна Роговцева	July 12, 2007	order of state	edict
181	Mykola Zhaurov	Микола Єгорович Жауров	July 2, 2007	order of state	edict
180	Vyacheslav Bryukhovetsky	В'ячеслав Степанович Брюховецький	June 25, 2007	order of state	edict
179	Platon Kostyuk	Платон Григорович Костюк	May 16, 2007	order of state	edict
178	Kuzma Derevyanko	Кузьма Миколайович Дерев'янко	May 7, 2007	gold star	edict	posthumously
177	Ivan Vakarchuk	Іван Олександрович Вакарчук	March 5, 2007	order of state	edict
176	Yurii Mitropolskiy	Юрiй Олексiйович Митропольський	January 18, 2007	order of state	edict
175	Yuriy Orobets	Юрiй Миколайович Оробець	January 18, 2007	order of state	edict	posthumously
174	Oleksa Hirnyk	Олекса Миколайович Гiрник	January 18, 2007	order of state	edict	posthumously

== 2006 ==
Total number of awards: 25.

N	English name	Ukrainian name	Conferment date	Distinction	Link	Notes
173	Oleksandr Maselsky	Олександр Степанович Масельський	December 5, 2006	order of state	edict	posthumously
172	Valentyn Landyk	Валентин Іванович Ландик	November 21, 2006	order of state	edict.	Annulled (Note: Annulled on 22 November 2024 in accordance with law 4074-IX, which deprived all state awards, including the title of Hero of Ukraine, of those deemed by the National Security and Defense Council and Volodymyr Zelenskyy as having supported Russia's aggression against Ukraine.)
171	Volodymyr Stashys	Володимир Володимирович Сташис	November 1, 2006	order of state	edict
170	Yevhen Pronyuk	Євген Васильович Пронюк	September 25, 2006	order of state	edict
169	Anatoly Shapiro	Анатолій Павлович Шапіро	September 21, 2006	gold star	edict	posthumously
168	Tetyana Markus	Тетяна Йосипівна Маркус	September 21, 2006	gold star	edict	posthumously
167	Valeriy Orobey	Валерій Леонідович Оробей	August 19, 2006	order of state	edict
166	Anatoliy Pavlenko	Анатолій Федорович Павленко	August 19, 2006	order of state	edict
165	Ivan Drach	Іван Федорович Драч	August 19, 2006	order of state	edict
164	Stepan Khmara	Степан Ількович Хмара	August 19, 2006	order of state	edict
163	Yuriy Shukhevych	Юрій Романович Шухевич	August 19, 2006	order of state	edict
162	Volodymyr Shevchenko	Володимир Павлович Шевченко	August 19, 2006	order of state	edict
161	Viktor Bondaryev	Віктор Леонідович Бондарєв	August 19, 2006	order of state	edict
160	Vira Royik	Віра Сергіївна Роїк	August 19, 2006	order of state	edict
159	Volodymyr Nikolayev	Володимир Костянтинович Ніколаєв	August 19, 2006	order of state	edict
158	Evgeniya Miroshnichenko	Євгенія Семенівна Мірошниченко	June 26, 2006	order of state	edict
157	Mykhaylo Vasylyshyn	Михайло Іванович Василишин	May 3, 2006	gold star	edict	posthumously
156	Volodymyr Tishura	Володимир Іванович Тішура	April 21, 2006	gold star	edict	posthumously
155	Mykola Tytenok	Микола Іванович Титенок	April 21, 2006	gold star	edict	posthumously
154	Oleksandr Lelechenko	Олександр Григорович Лелеченко	April 21, 2006	gold star	edict	posthumously
153	Vasily Ignatenko	Василь Іванович Ігнатенко	April 21, 2006	gold star	edict	posthumously
152	Mykola Vashchuk	Микола Васильович Ващук	April 21, 2006	gold star	edict	posthumously
151	Olena Iurkovska	Олена Юріївна Юрковська	April 3, 2006	gold star	edict
150	Ivan Spodarenko	Іван Васильович Сподаренко	January 23, 2006	order of state	edict
149	Nina Matviienko	Ніна Митрофанівна Матвієнко	January 21, 2006	order of state	edict

== 2005 ==
Total number of awards: 17.

N	English name	Ukrainian name	Conferment date	Distinction	Link	Notes
148	Oleksandr Sylyn	Олександр Опанасович Силин	December 30, 2005	order of state	edict
147	Vasyl Stus	Василь Семенович Стус	November 26, 2005	order of state	edict	posthumously
146	Borys Oliynyk	Борис Ілліч Олійник	October 21, 2005	order of state	edict
145	Mykhaylo Doroshko	Михайло Костянтинович Дорошко	August 23, 2005	order of state	edict
144	Ihor Yukhnovsky	Ігор Рафаїлович Юхновський	August 23, 2005	order of state	edict
143	Georgiy Gongadze	Георгій Русланович Гонгадзе	August 23, 2005	order of state	edict	posthumously
142	Oles Honchar	Олесь (Олександр) Терентійович Гончар	July 14, 2005	order of state	edict	posthumously
141	Vadym Hetman	Вадим Петрович Гетьман	July 11, 2005	order of state	edict	posthumously
140	Oleksandr Shalimov	Олександр Олексійович Шалімов	June 20, 2005	order of state	edict
139	Borys Voznytsky	Борис Григорович Возницький	May 16, 2005	order of state	edict
138	Oleksandr Momotenko	Олександр Іванович Момотенко	May 7, 2005	gold star	edict
137	Oleksiy Berest	Олексій Прокопович Берест	May 6, 2005	gold star	edict
136	Levko Lukyanenko	Левко Григорович Лук'яненко	April 19, 2005	order of state	edict
135	Dmytro Hnatyuk	Дмитро Михайлович Гнатюк	March 28, 2005	order of state	edict
134	Mykhaylo Sikorsky	Михайло Іванович Сікорський	March 11, 2005	order of state	edict
133	Maksym Hulyy	Максим Федотович Гулий	March 3, 2005	order of state	edict	centenerary
132	Ivan Danylenko	Іван Юхимович Даниленко	January 19, 2005	order of state	edict

== 2004 ==
Total number of awards: 41. Some of the awards have come into question. See Hero of Ukraine: Controversial awards for more details.

N	English name	Ukrainian name	Conferment date	Distinction	Link	Notes
131	Vitali Klitschko	Віталій Володимирович Кличко	December 31, 2004	order of state	edict
130	Andriy Shevchenko	Андрій Миколайович Шевченко	December 31, 2004	order of state	edict
129	Volodymyr Lytvyn	Володимир Михайлович Литвин	December 9, 2004	order of state	edict
128	Mykola Havrylenkov	Микола Протасович Гавриленков	November 19, 2004	order of state	edict
127	Volodymyr Vydobora	Володимир Деонисович Видобора	November 16, 2004	order of state	edict
126	Tetyana Korost	Тетяна Михайлівна Корост	November 16, 2004	order of state	edict
125	Petro Sabluk	Петро Трохимович Саблук	November 16, 2004	order of state	edict
124	Anatoliy Holovko	Анатолій Григорович Головко	November 16, 2004	order of state	edict
123	Oleksandr Kudrevych	Олександр Андрійович Кудревич	November 16, 2004	order of state	edict
122	Hennadiy Knyshov	Геннадій Васильович Книшов	November 10, 2004	order of state	edict
121	Viktor Ostapchuk	Віктор Миколайович Остапчук	October 21, 2004	order of state	edict
120	Ivan Vuzhynskyy	Іван Андрійович Вужинський	October 21, 2004	order of state	edict
119	Volodymyr Matvienko	Володимир Павлович Матвієнко	October 20, 2004	order of state	edict
118	Viktor Smyrnov	Віктор Сергійович Смирнов	October 19, 2004	gold star	edict
117	Volodymyr Petrenko	Володимир Іванович Петренко	October 13, 2004	order of state	edict
116	Lev Venedyktov	Лев Миколайович Венедиктов	October 8, 2004	order of state	edict
115	Fevza Yakubov	Февза Якубович Якубов	October 4, 2004	order of state	edict
114	Dmytro Pavlychko	Дмитро Васильович Павличко	September 27, 2004	order of state	edict
113	Yuriy Bilobrov	Юрій Миколайович Білобров	September 27, 2004	order of state	edict
112	Leonid Baysarov	Леонід Володимирович Байсаров	August 27, 2004	order of state	edict	Annulled (Note: Annulled on 19 January 2025 in accordance with Decree No. 38/2025, which deprived all state awards, including the title of Hero of Ukraine, of those deemed by the National Security and Defense Council and Volodymyr Zelenskyy as having supported Russia's aggression against Ukraine.)
111	Pavlo Zahrebelnyi	Павло Архипович Загребельний	August 25, 2004	order of state	edict
110	Yuriy Boyko	Юрій Анатолійович Бойко	August 22, 2004	order of state	edict	Annulled (Note: Annulled on 19 January 2025 in accordance with Decree No. 38/2025, which deprived all state awards, including the title of Hero of Ukraine, of those deemed by the National Security and Defense Council and Volodymyr Zelenskyy as having supported Russia's aggression against Ukraine.)
109	Oleksandr Bartyenyev	Олександр Володимирович Бартєнєв	August 22, 2004	order of state	edict	see details
108	Leonid Yakovyshyn	Леонід Григорович Яковишин	August 22, 2004	order of state	edict
107	Tetyana Molchanova	Тетяна Іванівна Молчанова	August 22, 2004	order of state	edict
106	Yaroslav Shved	Ярослав Антонович Швед	August 22, 2004	order of state	edict
105	Petro Ivashchuk	Петро Володимирович Іващук	August 21, 2004	order of state	edict
104	Myroslav Vantukh	Мирослав Михайлович Вантух	August 21, 2004	order of state	edict
103	Oleksandr Zhdanov	Олександр Андрійович Жданов	August 19, 2004	order of state	edict
102	Vasyl Tatsiy	Василь Якович Тацій	August 19, 2004	order of state	edict
101	Yana Klochkova	Яна Олександрівна Клочкова	August 18, 2004	gold star	edict
100	Serhiy Tulub	Сергій Борисович Тулуб	August 6, 2004	order of state	edict	Annulled (Note: Annulled on 22 November 2024 in accordance with law 4074-IX, which deprived all state awards, including the title of Hero of Ukraine, of those deemed by the National Security and Defense Council and Volodymyr Zelenskyy as having supported Russia's aggression against Ukraine.)
99	Oleksandr Vladymyrenko	Олександр Володимирович Владимиренко	August 4, 2004	order of state	edict
98	Mykhaylo Kostyuchenko	Михайло Іванович Костюченко	August 4, 2004	order of state	edict
97	Viktor Shchehol	Віктор Андрійович Щеголь	July 22, 2004	order of state	edict
96	Leonid Lytvynov	Леонід Федорович Литвинов	July 7, 2004	order of state	edict	Annulled (Note: Annulled on 19 January 2025 in accordance with Decree No. 38/2025, which deprived all state awards, including the title of Hero of Ukraine, of those deemed by the National Security and Defense Council and Volodymyr Zelenskyy as having supported Russia's aggression against Ukraine.)
95	Yuriy Bondin	Юрій Миколайович Бондін	May 18, 2004	order of state	edict
94	Mykola Orlenko	Микола Іванович Орленко	May 18, 2004	order of state	edict
93	Stanislav Konyukhov	Станіслав Миколайович Конюхов	April 12, 2004	order of state	edict
92	Yaroslav Mykytyn	Ярослав Іванович Микитин	April 1, 2004	order of state	edict
91	Volodymyr Lukyanenko	Володимир Матвійович Лук'яненко	February 26, 2004	order of state	edict

== 2003 ==
Total number of awards: 16.

N	English name	Ukrainian name	Conferment date	Distinction	Link	Notes
90	Mykola Surhay	Микола Сафонович Сургай	November 20, 2003	order of state	edict
89	Viktor Synyakov	Віктор Михайлович Синяков	November 12, 2003	order of state	edict
88	Viktor Siletskyy	Віктор Петрович Сілецький	November 12, 2003	order of state	edict
87	Mykola Vasylchenko	Микола Семенович Васильченко	November 12, 2003	order of state	edict
86	Dmytro Melnychuk	Дмитро Олексійович Мельничук	November 5, 2003	order of state	edict
85	Raisa Kyrychenko	Раїса Опанасівна Кириченко	October 31, 2003	order of state	edict
84	Mykola Hrynyov	Микола Герасимович Гриньов	August 27, 2003	order of state	edict
83	Tetyana Zasukha	Тетяна Володимирівна Засуха	August 21, 2003	order of state	edict
82	Oleksandr Roy	Олександр Іванович Рой	August 21, 2003	order of state	edict
81	Vasyl Moroz	Василь Максимович Мороз	August 21, 2003	order of state	edict
80	Anatoliy Avdiyevskyy	Анатолій Тимофійович Авдієвський	August 16, 2003	order of state	edict
79	Volodymyr Polyachenko	Володимир Аврумович Поляченко	August 14, 2003	order of state	edict
78	Volodymyr Boyko	Володимир Семенович Бойко	July 18, 2003	order of state	edict
77	Mykola Yankovskyy	Микола Андрійович Янковський	May 22, 2003	order of state	edict
76	Vasyl Melnykov	Василь Олександрович Мельников	February 20, 2003	gold star	edict	posthumously
75	Yukhym Zvyahilsky	Юхим Леонідович Звягільський	February 20, 2003	order of state	edict

== 2002 ==
Total number of awards: 25.

N	English name	Ukrainian name	Conferment date	Distinction	Link	Notes
74	Anatoliy Vuychytsky	Анатолій Станіславович Вуйчицький	December 28, 2002	order of state	edict
73	Volodymyr Didkivskyy	Володимир Олександрович Дідківський	November 13, 2002	order of state	edict
72	Anatoliy Pachevskyy	Анатолій Мартинович Пачевський	November 13, 2002	order of state	edict
71	Oleksandr Borovyk	Олександр Григорович Боровик	November 13, 2002	order of state	edict
70	Oleksiy Prylipka	Олексій Васильович Приліпка	November 13, 2002	order of state	edict
69	Dmytro Motornyy	Дмитро Костянтинович Моторний	November 2, 2002	order of state	edict
68	Semen Potashnyk	Семен Ізрайлевич Поташник	October 1, 2002	order of state	edict
67	Fedir Ivanov	Федір Антонович Іванов	September 19, 2002	order of state	edict
66	Volodymyr Komanov	Володимир Геннадійович Команов	August 29, 2002	order of state	edict
65	Yuriy Aleksyeyev	Юрій Сергійович Алексєєв	August 22, 2002	order of state	edict
64	Anatoliy Buhayets	Анатолій Олександрович Бугаєць	August 22, 2002	order of state	edict
63	Fedir Muravchenko	Федір Михайлович Муравченко	August 22, 2002	order of state	edict
62	Sofia Rotaru	Софія Михайлівна Євдокименко-Ротару	August 7, 2002	order of state	edict
61	Oleksandr Kachura	Олександр Степанович Качура	May 23, 2002	order of state	edict
60	Valeri Lobanovsky	Валерій Васильович Лобановський	May 15, 2002	order of state	edict	posthumously
59	Heorhiy Kirpa	Георгій Миколайович Кірпа	April 23, 2002	order of state	edict
58	Hryhoriy Bondar	Григорій Васильович Бондар	April 22, 2002	order of state	edict
57	Anatoliy Frantsuz	Анатолій Йосипович Француз	April 15, 2002	gold star	edict
56	Anatoliy Kryvoruchko	Анатолій Тихонович Криворучко	March 18, 2002	order of state	edict
55	Avhustyn Voloshyn	Августин Іванович Волошин	March 15, 2002	order of state	edict	posthumously
54	Albina Deryuhina	Альбіна Миколаївна Дерюгіна	March 15, 2002	order of state	edict	mother of Irina Deriugina
53	Ivan Kopychay	Іван Васильович Копичай	March 15, 2002	order of state	edict
52	Mykola Kolessa	Микола Філаретович Колесса	January 21, 2002	order of state	edict
51	Oleksandr Korostashov	Олександр Григорович Коросташов	January 19, 2002	order of state	edict
50	Vasyl Tkachuk	Василь Михайлович Ткачук	January 19, 2002	order of state	edict

== 2001 ==
Total number of awards: 20.

N	English name	Ukrainian name	Conferment date	Distinction	Link	Notes
49	Volodymyr Murzenko	Володимир Григорович Мурзенко	December 19, 2001	order of state	edict
48	Yuriy Baranov	Юрій Іванович Баранов	December 19, 2001	order of state	edict
47	Zinayida Hryshko	Зінаїда Михайлівна Гришко	November 13, 2001	order of state	edict
46	Mykola Byalyk	Микола Іванович Бялик	November 13, 2001	order of state	edict
45	Anatoliy Lavrynenko	Анатолій Анатолійович Лавриненко	November 13, 2001	order of state	edict
44	Pavlyna Shapovalenko	Павлина Михайлівна Шаповаленко	November 13, 2001	order of state	edict
43	Pavlo Soltus	Павло Станіславович Солтус	August 23, 2001	order of state	edict
42	Hennadiy Astrov-Shumilov	Геннадій Костянтинович Астров-Шумілов	August 23, 2001	order of state	edict
41	Serhiy Rodityelyev	Сергій Васильович Родітєлєв	August 23, 2001	order of state	edict
40	Yuriy Tishkov	Юрій Михайлович Тішков	August 21, 2001	gold star	edict
39	Volodymyr Kozyavkin	Володимир Ілліч Козявкін	August 21, 2001	order of state	edict
38	Yevhen Bereznyak	Євген Степанович Березняк	August 21, 2001	gold star	edict	aka "Major Vykhor"
37	Oleksandr Omelchenko	Олександр Олександрович Омельченко	August 21, 2001	order of state	edict
36	Leonid Kravchuk	Леонід Макарович Кравчук	August 21, 2001	order of state	edict
35	Ivan Plyushch	Іван Степанович Плющ	August 21, 2001	order of state	edict
34	Tamara Proshkuratova	Тамара Сергіївна Прошкуратова	August 21, 2001	order of state	edict
33	Ivan Dzyuba	Іван Михайлович Дзюба	July 26, 2001	order of state	edict
32	Oleksandr Bilash	Олександр Іванович Білаш	March 6, 2001	order of state	edict
31	Tetiana Yablonska	Тетяна Нилівна Яблонська	March 3, 2001	order of state	edict
30	Serhiy Bubka	Сергій Назарович Бубка	February 4, 2001	order of state	edict

== 2000 ==
Total number of awards: 9.

N	English name	Ukrainian name	Conferment date	Distinction	Link	Notes
29	Mykola Rudenko	Микола Данилович Руденко	December 19, 2000	order of state	edict
28	Volodymyr Litvinov	Володимир Григорович Літвінов	August 22, 2000	order of state	edict
27	Mykhaylo Borysyuk	Михайло Дем'янович Борисюк	August 21, 2000	order of state	edict
26	Vyacheslav Chornovil	В'ячеслав Максимович Чорновіл	August 21, 2000	order of state	edict	posthumously
25	Oleksandr Vozianov	Олександр Федорович Возіанов	August 21, 2000	order of state	edict
24	Volodymyr Filipchuk	Володимир Станіславович Філіпчук	August 3, 2000	order of state	edict
23	Petro Tronko	Петро Тимофійович Тронько	July 7, 2000	order of state	edict
22	Vyacheslav Bohuslayev	В'ячеслав Олександрович Богуслаєв	January 19, 2000	order of state	edict	Temporarily annulled (Note: In 2023, sanctions were placed on him by Ukraine which temporarily deprived him of all his state awards for a period of ten years, although this could be renewed by the president in a new decree.)
21	Mykola Pavlyuk	Микола Пантелеймонович Павлюк	January 14, 2000	order of state	edict

== 1999 ==
Total number of awards: 19.

N	English name	Ukrainian name	Conferment date	Distinction	Link	Notes
20	Petro Balabuyev	Петро Васильович Балабуєв	December 30, 1999	order of state	edict
19	Anatoliy Myalytsya	Анатолій Костянтинович М'ялиця	December 30, 1999	order of state	edict
18	Leonid Kadeniuk	Леонід Костянтинович Каденюк	December 3, 1999	gold star	edict
17	Ivan Herasymov	Іван Олександрович Герасимов	October 27, 1999	gold star	edict
16	Luka Sushko	Лука Григорович Сушко	October 27, 1999	gold star	edict
15	Ivan Zaporozhets	Іван Іванович Запорожець	October 8, 1999	order of state	edict
14	Heorhiy Skudar	Георгій Маркович Скудар	September 23, 1999	order of state	edict
13	Viktor Skopenko	Віктор Васильович Скопенко	September 14, 1999	order of state	edict
12	Alfred Kozlovskyy	Альфред Іванович Козловський	September 14, 1999	order of state	edict
11	Vasyl Petrynyuk	Василь Андрійович Петринюк	August 21, 1999	order of state	edict
10	Stanislav Strebko	Станіслав Кирилович Стребко	August 21, 1999	order of state	edict
9	Kateryna Hordyeychuk	Катерина Іллівна Гордєйчук	August 21, 1999	order of state	edict
8	Serhiy Heniyevskyy	Сергій Іванович Генієвський	August 21, 1999	order of state	edict
7	Mykhaylo Hordovenko	Михайло Васильович Гордовенко	August 21, 1999	order of state	edict
6	Oleksandr Halunenko	Олександр Васильович Галуненко	August 21, 1999	gold star	edict
5	Semen Antonets	Семен Свиридонович Антонець	August 21, 1999	order of state	edict
4	Volodymyr Sichovyy	Володимир Іванович Січовий	May 8, 1999	order of state	edict
3	Vitaliy Satskyy	Віталій Антонович Сацький	January 28, 1999	order of state	edict
2	Lyubov Mala	Любов Трохимівна Мала	January 12, 1999	order of state	edict

== 1998 ==
Total number of awards: 1.

N	English name	Ukrainian name	Conferment date	Distinction	Link	Notes
1	Borys Paton	Борис Євгенович Патон	November 26, 1998	order of state	edict
