= Roik =

Roik is a surname. Notable people with the surname include:

- Matt Roik (born 1979), Canadian lacrosse player
- Vera Roik (1911–2010), Ukrainian embroiderer
