= Oleksandr Labunskyi =

Ukrainian soldier

- Олександр Миколайович Лабунський
- Born: July 13, 1982; Sarny, Rivne Oblast, Ukrainian SSR, Soviet Union
- Died: March 14, 2022 (aged 39); Kyiv Oblast, Ukraine
- Military career
- Allegiance: Ukraine
- Branch: Ukrainian Ground Forces
- Conflicts: Russian Invasion of Ukraine
- Awards: Hero of Ukraine

Oleksandr Mykolayovych Labunskyi (Ukrainian: Олександр Миколайович Лабунський; 13 June 1982, Sarny Rivne Oblast – 14 March 2022, Kyiv region, Ukraine) was a senior soldier, a driver of a reactive artillery battery 128th Mountain Assault Brigade Armed Forces of Ukraine, who distinguished himself during the Russian invasion of Ukraine, Hero of Ukraine with the award "Order of the Gold Star" (posthumously).

== Biography ==
After the start of the Russian invasion of Ukraine, he served in the 128th Mountain Assault Brigade, first near Buch, then near Vyshhorod. Senior soldier Labunsky served as the commander of the automotive division of the reactive artillery battery

With the direct participation of Labunsky, the brigade's jet battery performed more than thirty combat missions in the city of Kyiv, as a result of which enemy columns, accumulations of manpower and equipment were hit. Dozens of units of combat and special equipment were destroyed, as well as personnel of battalion tactical groups of the occupiers.

Died on March 14, 2022, at around 2:00 p.m. as a result of enemy BM-21 "Grad" fire in the Kyiv region. He was buried on March 19 in the city of Sarny.

== Awards ==
The title "Hero of Ukraine" with the award of the "Golden Star" order (March 19, 2022, posthumously) - for personal courage and heroism, shown in the defense of the state sovereignty and territorial integrity of Ukraine, loyalty to the military oath.

== See also ==
- List of Heroes of Ukraine

== Notes ==
°
