= Viacheslav Radionov =

Ukrainian military aviator (1997–2022)

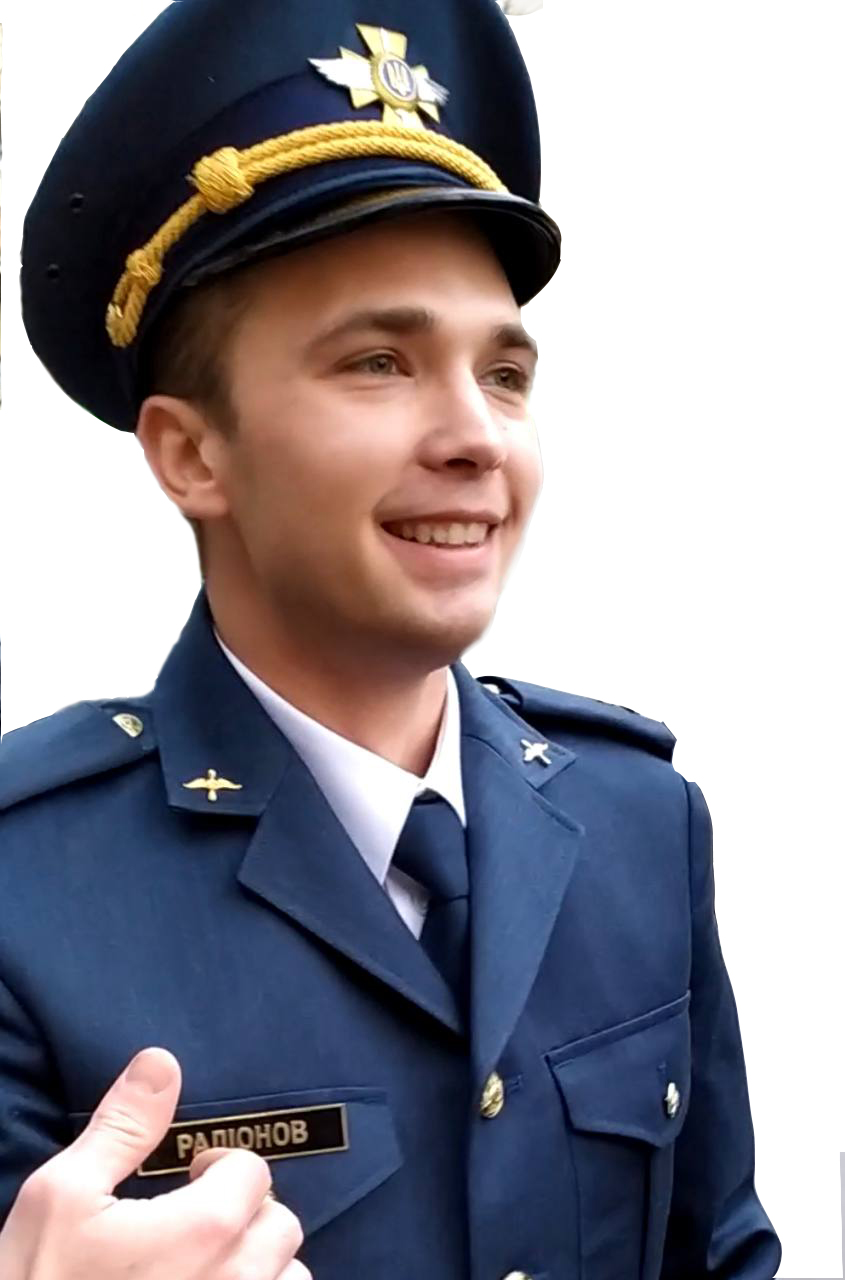
- Born: 16 January 1997; Zaporizhzhia, Ukraine
- Died: 24 February 2022 (aged 25); Vasylkiv, Ukraine
- Alma mater: Zaporizhzhia Regional Boarding School with Enhanced Military and Physical Training, "Zakhysnyk"
- Military career
- Allegiance: Ukraine
- Branch: Ukrainian Air Force
- Service years: 2019—2022
- Rank: Senior lieutenant
- Conflicts: Russo-Ukrainian War; Russian invasion of Ukraine
- Awards: Order of the Gold Star (posthumously)

Viacheslav Denysovych Radionov (Ukrainian: В'ячеслав Денисович Радіонов; 16 January 1997 – 24 February 2022) was a Ukrainian military aviator, a senior pilot, and a senior lieutenant of the 40th Tactical Aviation Brigade who was killed during the Russian invasion of Ukraine in February 2022. He was posthumously awarded the title of Hero of Ukraine with the Order of the Golden Star.

== Biography ==
In 2014, he graduated from the Zakhysnyk Zaporizhzhia Regional Boarding School with Enhanced Military and Physical Training.

He graduated from the Ivan Kozhedub National Air Force University.

He served in the 40th Tactical Aviation Brigade.

In 2021, he participated in a military parade commemorating the 30th anniversary of Ukrainian independence.

Radionov died on 24 February 2022, while evacuating various aircraft during a missile strike at Vasylkiv Airfield. Thanks to his actions, the entire fleet of aircraft in the brigade took off from Vasylkiv in Kyiv Oblast, saving them from a missile strike. He was laid to rest in Vasylkiv Cemetery alongside his comrades.

== Awards ==
Radionov was posthumously awarded the title of Hero of Ukraine with the Order of the Gold Star on 28 February 2022, for "personal courage and heroism demonstrated in the defense of Ukraine's state sovereignty and territorial integrity, and for his unwavering loyalty to the military oath".
