= Mykhailo Nesolionyi =

Ukrainian soldier (1988–2022)

- Born: 8 July 1988; Snizhkiv, Kharkiv Oblast, Ukrainian SSR, Soviet Union
- Died: 24 February 2022 (aged 33); Near Hlukhiv, Sumy Oblast, Ukraine
- Children: 3
- Military career
- Allegiance: Ukraine
- Branch: Ukrainian Ground Forces
- Rank: Junior sergeant
- Conflicts: Russo-Ukrainian War; Russian invasion of Ukraine
- Awards: Order of the Gold Star (posthumously)

Mykhailo Mykhailovych Nesolionyi (Ukrainian: Михайло Михайлович Несольоний; 8 June 1988 – 24 February 2022) was a Ukrainian military personnel who died during the Russian invasion of Ukraine in February 2022. He is a Hero of Ukraine, awarded the Order of the Golden Star, and a participant in the Russian-Ukrainian war.

== Biography ==
Nesoluonyi was born on 8 June 1988, in Snizhkiv, a village in Kharkiv Oblast, northeastern Ukraine.

He served in the Armed Forces of Ukraine since 2015 and worked as a driver of a medical armored personnel carrier (MT-LB) in the 16th Separate Motorized Brigade "Poltava" of the 58th Separate Motorized Brigade of the Armed Forces of Ukraine.

He died on 24 February 2022, on the first day of the Russian invasion of Ukraine, in close combat with enemy forces while evacuating people. Early in the morning on that day, Russian forces had attempted to breach the border in the Bachivsk area but were halted on the Kipti-Bachivsk highway near Hodunivka village near Hlukhiv, where fierce fighting broke out.

Several soldiers were injured, and the transport of the brigade's medical unit was called for their evacuation. To assist his comrades, a medical transporter based on the MT-LB and marked with Red Cross symbols promptly arrived, driven by Junior Sergeant Nesolionyi. Despite the obvious danger of the enemy's advance, he displayed courage and bravery and continued to fulfill his combat mission of evacuating people. However, he came under targeted fire from the Russian forces, who clearly saw the Red Cross markings through their sights. The armored vehicle was disabled, and his comrades managed to pull out the wounded, but they couldn't save Nesolionyi in time. He died a hero's death, fulfilling his duty at the frontline. He was buried on 7 April in his native village of Snizhkiv.

== Awards ==
On 2 March 2022, Nesolionyi was posthumously awarded the title of Hero of Ukraine with the Order of the Golden Star for personal courage and heroism demonstrated in defense of Ukraine's state sovereignty and territorial integrity, as well as for his loyalty to the military oath.

== Family ==
Nesolionyi is survived by his wife and their three children.
