= Viacheslav Khodakivskyi =

Ukrainian soldier (1981–2022)

- В'ячеслав Анатолійович Ходаківський
- Born: Viacheslav Anatoliyovych Khodakivskyi; 5 October 1981; Berdychiv, Zhytomyr region, Ukraine
- Died: 21 March 2022 (aged 40); Zaporizhzhia region, Ukraine
- Alma mater: Ivan Kozhedub National Air Force University
- Military career
- Allegiance: Ukraine
- Branch: Armed Forces of Ukraine
- Rank: Major
- Unit: 7th Tactical Aviation Brigade (Ukraine) Ivan Kozhedub National Air Force University
- Conflicts: Russo-Ukrainian War; Russian invasion of Ukraine
- Awards: Order of the Gold Star; Order of Bohdan Khmelnytskyi

Viacheslav Khodakivskyi (Ukrainian: В'ячеслав Анатолійович Ходаківський; October 5, 1981, Berdychiv, Zhytomyr region — March 21, 2022, Zaporizhzhia region) was a Ukrainian soldier, major of the 7th Brigade of the Armed Forces of Ukraine, a participant of the Russian-Ukrainian war. Hero of Ukraine (2023, posthumously). Knight of the Order of Bohdan Khmelnytskyi, III degree (2022).

== Biography ==
Viacheslav Khodakivskyi was born on October 5, 1981, in Berdychiv, Zhytomyr region.

He graduated from the Higher Artistic Vocational School (2000) and the Kharkiv Ivan Kozhedub National Air Force University (2004).

In 2004, he began his service in Kolomyia, Ivano-Frankivsk region, and later served as a senior pilot, commander of the aviation unit of an aviation squadron, chief of staff – first deputy commander of an aviation squadron, deputy commander of an aviation squadron of the 7th Tactical Aviation Brigade.

Participant of the ATO/JFO.

He died on March 21, 2022, in Zaporizhzhia region.

Khodakivski was posthumously awarded the "Hero of Ukraine" title by President Zelenskyy for "personal courage and heroism shown in the defense of state sovereignty and territorial integrity of Ukraine, selfless service to the Ukrainian people".

== Awards ==
- Hero of Ukraine with the Order of the Golden Star (March 20, 2023, posthumously) – for personal courage and heroism displayed in the defense of state sovereignty and territorial integrity of Ukraine, selfless service to the Ukrainian people.
- Order of Bohdan Khmelnytskyi, III class (March 13, 2022) – for personal courage and selfless actions in the defense of state sovereignty and territorial integrity of Ukraine, loyalty to the military oath.
- The ATO Participant Badge.
- The Presidential Award for Participation in the ATO.
- Medal for 15 years of conscientious service.
