= Oleksandr Kapichun =

Ukrainian soldier (1986–2022)

- Олександр Валерійович Капічун
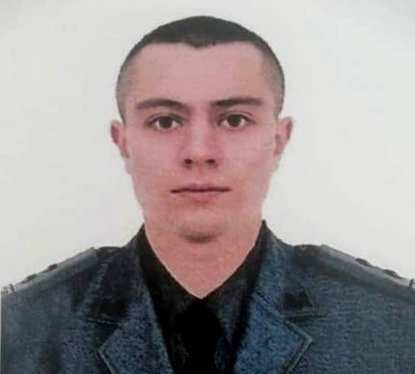
- Born: December 7, 1986
- Died: February 27, 2022 (aged 35); Makariv
- Cause of death: Russian invasion of Ukraine
- Citizenship: Ukraine
- Occupation: Military
- Known for: Hero of Ukraine

Oleksandr Valeriyovych Kapichun (Ukrainian: Олександр Валерійович Капічун; December 7, 1986 – February 27, 2022, Makariv, Ukraine) was a Ukrainian military serviceman, lieutenant colonel of the 142nd National Center of the SSO of the Armed Forces of Ukraine, a participant in the Russian-Ukrainian war. Hero of Ukraine (2022, posthumous).

== Biography ==
Oleksandr Kapichun was born on December 7, 1986. In 2009, he graduated from Zhytomyr Military Institute named after S.P. Koroliov with a gold medal.

Oleksandr served as a special constable, since 2016 he served as an officer of the Special Operations Forces. He is a participant in Joint Forces Operation.

During the Russian invasion of Ukraine in 2022, thanks to his heroic actions, the special-purpose group he led made a surprise attack and stopped the enemy column, destroyed about 5 units of armored vehicles and a significant number of enemy personnel near Makariv, in the Kyiv region. Oleksandr died on February 27, 2022, while covering up the departure of the group. Oleksandr had a wife and a young son.
