= Oleksandr Mostovyi =

Ukrainian soldier

- Born: Oleksandr Volodymyrovych Mostovyi; 1978 (age 47–48)
- Military career
- Allegiance: Ukraine
- Branch: Ukrainian Air Force
- Rank: Colonel
- Conflicts: Russo-Ukrainian War; Russian invasion of Ukraine
- Awards: Order of the Gold Star

Oleksandr Volodymyrovych Mostovyi (Ukrainian: Мостовий Олександр Володимирович; born 1978) is a Ukrainian military commander, a colonel. He is the commander of the 831st Tactical Aviation Brigade. He is a participant of the Russian-Ukrainian war and distinguished himself during the Russian invasion of Ukraine in 2022. He is a Hero of Ukraine (2022).

== Biography ==
He holds the qualification of "Class 1 Pilot."

He participated in the Anti-Terrorist Operation (ATO)/Joint Forces Operation (JFO). Since the beginning of the hybrid aggression by the Russian Federation, including the occupation of Crimea, Donetsk, and Luhansk regions in 2014, Colonel Mostovyi actively participated in aviation support for the actions of the Anti-Terrorist Operation.

Since 2020, he has been the commander of the 831st Tactical Aviation Brigade.

On the night of February 23 to 24, he led the aircraft and 100% of the brigade's equipment out of harm's way and relocated them to other operational airfields.

During the Russian invasion of Ukraine in 2022, near Vasylkiv, he shot down a Russian Il-76 aircraft, as well as two Mi-24 helicopters, preventing the landing of armed forces.

== Awards ==
He was awarded the title of Hero of Ukraine with the Order of the Golden Star on February 28, 2022, for personal courage and heroism demonstrated in defense of Ukraine's state sovereignty and territorial integrity, as well as for his loyalty to the military oath.

He was also granted the honorary citizenship of Myrhorod in 2022.
