= Lyubov Mala =

Ukrainian therapist

Hero of Ukraine Lyubov Mala
- Любов Мала
- Born: 13 January 1919; Kopani, Zaporizhzhia Oblast, Ukrainian SSR, Soviet Union
- Died: April 14, 2003 (aged 84); Kharkiv, Ukraine
- Resting place: Cemetery No. 2, Kharkiv
- Education: 1st Kharkiv Medical Institute
- Scientific career
- Fields: Cardiology
- Academic advisors: Borys Khmelnytskyi

Lyubov Trokhymivna Mala (Ukrainian: Любов Трохимівна Мала; 13 January 1919 – 14 April 2003) was a Soviet and Ukrainian therapist, Doctor of Medical Sciences, full member of the USSR Academy of Medical Sciences. She was the first female recipient of title Hero of Ukraine.

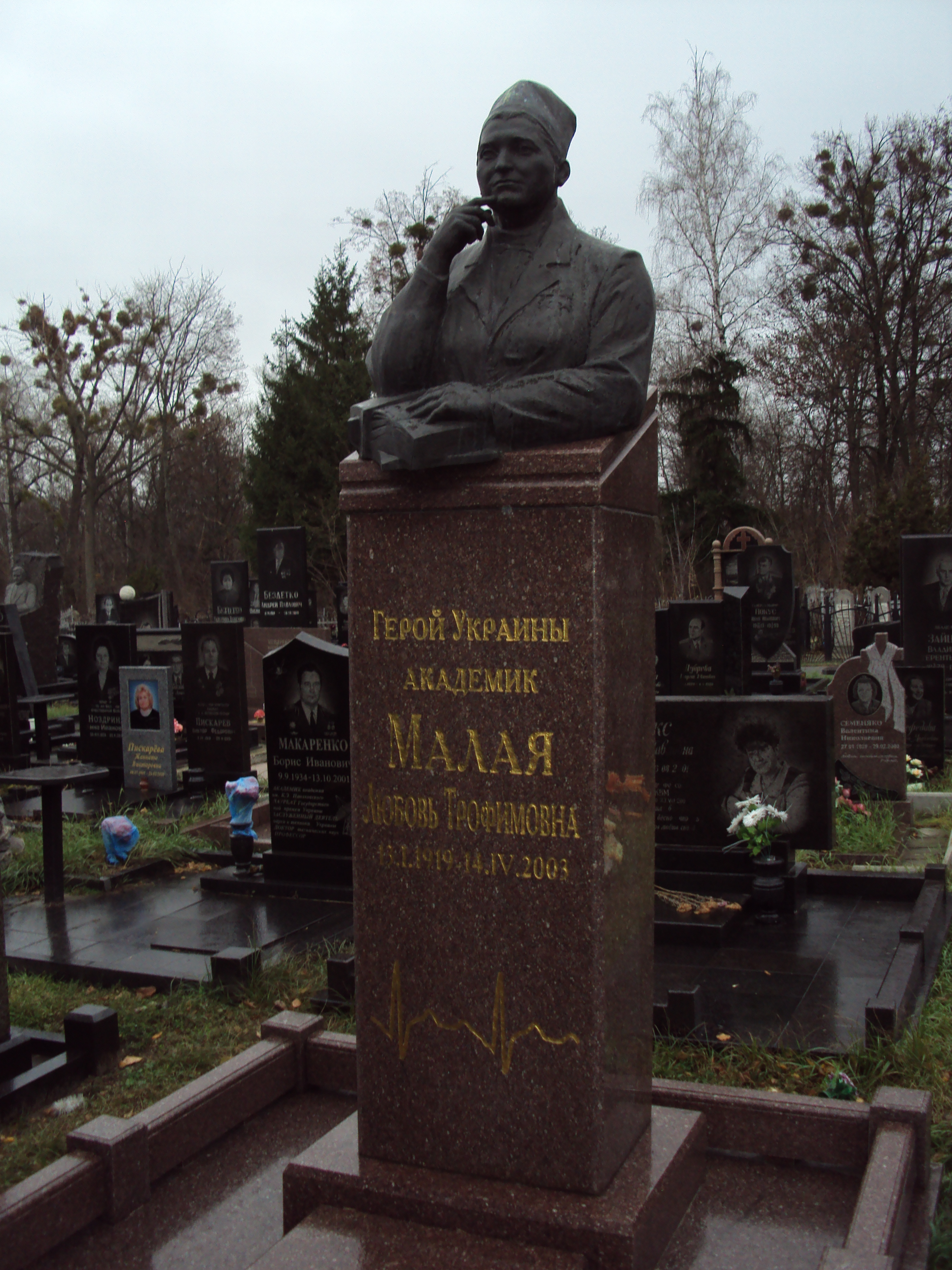
Mala's grave
