= Andrii Ivashko =

Ukrainian soldier (1980–2022)

- Native name: Андрій Олександрович Івашко
- Born: Andrii Oleksandrovych Ivashko; June 29, 1980; Krolevets, Sumy Oblast, Ukrainian SSR, USSR
- Died: 24 February 2022 (aged 41) Hlukhiv, Sumy Oblast, Ukraine
- Allegiance: Ukraine
- Branch: Ukrainian Ground Forces
- Rank: Senior sergeant
- Conflicts: Russo-Ukrainian War; Russian invasion of Ukraine †
- Awards: Order of the Gold Star (posthumously)

Andrii Ivashko (Ukrainian: Андрій Олександрович Івашко; 29 June 1980 – 24 February 2022) was a Ukrainian soldier who was killed during the Russian invasion of Ukraine in February 2022. He is Hero of Ukraine with the award of the Order of the Golden Star.

== Biography ==
Andrey Ivashko was born in 1980 in Krolevets, Sumy Oblast.

On 6 December 2019, he was awarded general diplomas of the chairmen of the Hlukhiv District State Administration and the District Council on the occasion of the Defenders of Ukraine Day.

On 24 February 2022, he was killed on the first day of the Russian invasion of Ukraine. He served in the air defense forces located near the village of Oblozhky in a military unit known as Hlukhiv-2. During a rocket attack, at the risk of his life, Andrii Ivashko personally gave information about the actions of the enemy. In the early morning of this day, Russian troops attempted to break through the border near Bachivsk, but were stopped near Hlukhiv, where military clashes ensued.

== Awards ==
- the title of Hero of Ukraine with the award of the Order of the Golden Star (2022, posthumously) — for personal courage and heroism shown in the defense of the state sovereignty and territorial integrity of Ukraine, loyalty to the military oath.
