= Andrii Kruhlov =

Ukrainian soldier

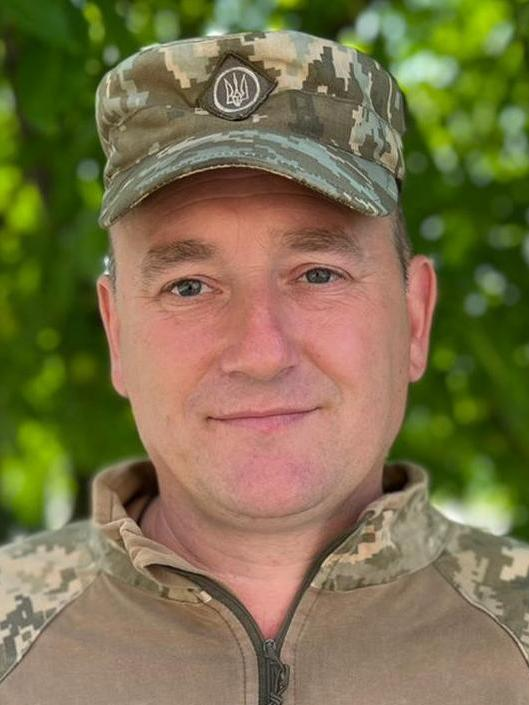
- Born: Andrii Mykolaiovych Kruhlov; Shepetivka, Khmelnytskyi Oblast, Ukraine
- Military career
- Allegiance: Ukraine
- Branch: Armed Forces of Ukraine
- Rank: Lieutenant colonel
- Conflicts: Russo-Ukrainian War; Russian invasion of Ukraine
- Awards: Order of the Gold Star

Andrii Mykolaiovych Kruhlov (Ukrainian:Андрій Миколайович Круглов; born in Shepetivka, Khmelnytskyi Oblast) is a Ukrainian military personnel, a lieutenant colonel. He is a Hero of Ukraine (2022).

== Biography ==
He commands a separate anti-aircraft missile division equipped with the "Buk-M1" anti-aircraft missile complexes.

He led the SAM (Surface-to-Air Missile) division "Buk" out of enemy attacks and personally destroyed two Russian helicopters and one aircraft.

== Awards ==
- He was awarded the title of Hero of Ukraine with the Order of the Golden Star on February 28, 2022, for personal courage and heroism demonstrated in defense of Ukraine's state sovereignty and territorial integrity, as well as for his loyalty to the military oath.
- He was also granted the honorary citizenship of Shepetivka in 2022.
