= Maksym Bilokon =

Ukrainian soldier (1997–2022)

- Born: Maksym Vitaliiovych Bilokon; 1 April 1997; Romny, Sumy Oblast, Ukraine
- Died: 27 February 2022 (aged 24); Near Chernihiv, Ukraine
- Education: Hetman Petro Sahaidachnyi National Ground Forces Academy
- Military career
- Allegiance: Ukraine
- Branch: Armed Forces of Ukraine
- Rank: Senior lieutenant
- Conflicts: Russo-Ukrainian War; Russian invasion of Ukraine
- Awards: Order of the Gold Star (posthumously)

Maksym Vitaliiovych Bilokon (Ukrainian: Максим Віталійович Білоконь; 1 April 1997 – 27 February 2022) was a senior lieutenant in the Armed Forces of Ukraine and a participant in the Russian-Ukrainian war. He was awarded the title of Hero of Ukraine posthumously in 2022.

== Biography ==
Maksym Bilokon was born on 1 April 1997, in Romny, Sumy Oblast.

He graduated from the State Boarding School with Enhanced Military-Physical Training "Cadet Corps" named after I. G. Kharitonenko of the State Border Guard Service of Ukraine in 2015, and later from the Petro Sahaidachnyi National Army Academy.

During the Russian invasion, he took part in the defense of Chernihiv, where he destroyed an enemy reconnaissance and sabotage group as well as two enemy tanks. He died on 27 February 2022, defending the city of Chernihiv against Russian forces, along with his tank crew.

He was buried in his hometown on 25 March 2022.

Maksym is survived by his mother, sister, two daughters, and his wife, who is also in the military.

== Awards ==
Maksym Bilokon was posthumously awarded the title of Hero of Ukraine with the Order of the Gold Star on 2 March 2022, "for personal courage and heroism demonstrated in defense of Ukraine's state sovereignty and territorial integrity, and for his loyalty to the military oath."

A street in Chernihiv was named Brestska Street after him by the decision of the city council on 21 February 2023.
