= Zinayida Hryshko =

Ukrainian zoo technician

Hero of Ukraine Zinayida Hryshko
- Born: Zinayida Mykhailivna Hryshko; 23 June 1948; Stadnytsia, Tetiiv Raion, Kyiv Oblast, Ukraine
- Occupation: Zoo technician
- Years active: 1971–present
- Awards: Hero of Ukraine; Order of Merit, Third Class

Zinayida Mykhailivna Hryshko (Ukrainian: Зінаїда Михайлівна Гришко; born 23 June 1948) is a Ukrainian zoo technician who is the chair of the board of the Zhdanov collective farm, having held the position since 1975. She organised it into a collective agricultural enterprise, and it was reformed into a LLC Mayak and has overseen development of the local area.

Previously, Hryshko was head technician on the board of the Zhdanova collective farm (today called the agricultural firm Lighthouse) located in the village of Zlatoustovo in 1971. She was a recipient of the Order of Merit, Third Class in 1998 and was titled Hero of Ukraine in 2001.

== Early life and education ==
On 23 June 1948, Hryshko was born in the village of Stadnytsia, Tetiiv Raion, Kyiv Oblast. She was the daughter of the teacher Lyudmila Leontyevna, who instilled the desire for knowledge in her daughter. From 1966 to 1971, Hryshko studied zootechnics at the Odesa Agricultural Institute. She graduated in 1971.

== Career ==
Immediately following her graduation, she was appointed head zoo technician in the Board of the Zhdanova collective farm (today called the agricultural firm Lighthouse) located in the village of Zlatoustovo in the Berezivka Raion, Odesa Oblast in February 1971. Hryshko was elected chairman of the board of the Zhdanov collective farm at a general meeting of collective farmers on 8 February 1975 and remains in the position.

During her leadership at Zhadnov collective farm, she reorganised into a collective agricultural enterprise, and it was reformed into a limited liability company called Mayak. Hyrshko oversaw the strengthening of the material base and increased the land size. She also saw the preservation of all production sites; a garage; all three farms; as well as a tractor station. Animal productivity was raised and her company was the first in the Berezivka Raion to exceed 4,000 milk yields from each cow and the number of cattle on the farm rose to approximately 3,000. Hyrshko has seen repairs to the farm's water supply and gasification systems. She provided assistance to cultural centres, schools (one of which was the construction of a ten-year school to enable students to acquire a secondary education), kindergartens, children received by the health camp "Chaika" operated by her agricultural company and the Church of St. John Chrysostom which she helped to rebuild after it was destroyed.

Hryshko was a deputy on Odesa Oblast Council and was the head of the Odesa Regional Council of Agricultural Producers. During the 2006 Ukrainian parliamentary election, she unsuccessfully stood for election to the Verkhovna Rada on behalf of the Lytvyn People's Bloc.

== Personal life ==
She is married to the economist Nikolai Vasilyevich Grishko.

== Awards ==
On 16 November 1995, Hryshko received the Honored Worker of Agriculture of Ukraine "for the successes achieved in the production of agricultural products, the introduction of modern forms of management." She earned the Order of Merit, Third Class on 10 November 1998 "for significant personal contribution to the development of agro-industrial production, many years of hard work." Hryshko was made a Hero of Ukraine by President Leonid Kuchma on 13 November 2001 "for outstanding personal services to the Ukrainian state in the development of agriculture, the introduction of modern forms of management." On 19 August 2011, she was awarded the Anniversary medal for the 20 years of independence of Ukraine "for significant personal contribution to socio-economic, scientific -technical and cultural and educational development of the Ukrainian state, significant labor achievements and many years of hard work."
