= Anatoliy Shapiro =

Soviet Jewish soldier

Hero of Ukraine Anatoliy Pavlovych Shapiro
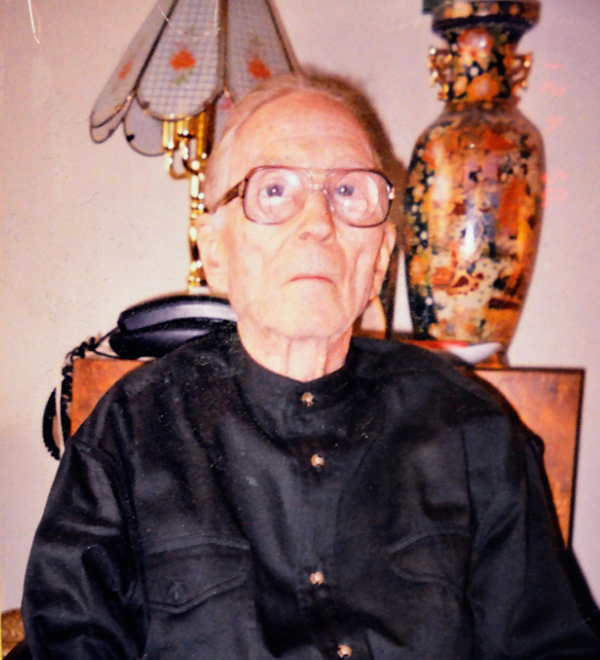
- Native name: Анатолій Павлович Шапіро
- Born: 18 January 1913; Kostiantynohrad, Russian Empire (now Berestyn, Ukraine)
- Died: 8 October 2005 (aged 92) New York City, New York, United States
- Allegiance: Soviet Union
- Awards: Hero of Ukraine; Order of the Red Star; Order of the Patriotic War; Order of the Patriotic War

Anatoliy Pavlovych Shapiro (Note: Ukrainian: Анатолій Павлович Шапіро, romanized: Anatolii Pavlovych Shapiro; Russian: Анатолий Павлович Шапиро, romanized: Anatoly Pavlovich Shapiro) (January 18, 1913 – October 8, 2005) was a Soviet Jewish soldier of the Army of the Soviet Union, who led the first elements of the advancing army into the Nazi-developed Auschwitz concentration camp in Poland, during the latter stages of World War II. He was awarded two Orders of the Red Star; two Orders of the Patriotic War of the 1st degree, for the Liberation of Kraków; the Order of the Patriotic War of the 2nd degree, and numerous other medals.

== Early life ==
Born to Jewish parents in the town of Kostyantynohrad (now Krasnohrad), Poltava Governorate (now Kharkiv region) which was then part of the Russian Empire, he graduated from the engineering-Pedagogical Institute (High School) in Zaporizhia, with a diploma as engineer-technologist.

Shapiro immediately enlisted for national service into the Red Army in 1935, where after study in Kharkiv, he was appointed to the rank of lieutenant. After three years national service, he remained as a volunteer in the Red Army, but worked as a civilian engineer in Zaporizhia and Dnipropetrovsk.

== World War II ==
After the start of Operation Barbarossa, the Nazi-Wehrmacht invasion of the Soviet Union, Shapiro re-enlisted as a volunteer in the Red Army in October 1941. Assigned to 76 platoon equipped with tanks within the 6th marine infantry brigade, Lieutenant Shapiro commanded a specialist explosives and demolition unit, and was immediately sent to the front line. He became involved in fighting the incoming invasion, seeing action in Autumn 1941 at River Mostricì, where he destroyed an existing metal bridge and further Nazi temporary bridging efforts to slow the advancing Nazi troops.

As a result of his leadership during this action, Shapiro was appointed deputy commander of the infantry battalion, and a month later, the commander of the battalion. In this position he led the unit in defensive operations in the Battle of the Caucasus in the Kuban, including liberating the towns of Tuapse and Rostov-on-Don, and fighting around Taganrog on the Mius River in 1942.

During the Battle of Kursk in July 1943, Shapiro was injured, necessitating a period of recuperation in hospital. During this period the 76th brigade was disbanded, and so on his release Shapiro was sent to the Irkutsk Division Commander of the battalion, and then assigned to command the more than 500 troops of the 100th rifle division of 106th rifle corps. At this time, the Red Army had the Nazi Wehrmacht in full retreat, and resultantly in command of this division under General F. M. Krasavin, Shapiro's division was the lead unit during the Red Army's liberation of much of Ukraine and Poland.

=== Liberation of Auschwitz concentration camp ===
As the Red Army advanced west closer to Oświęcim, the Nazis strengthened their defences greatly, hoping to win time to obliterate their crimes at Auschwitz concentration camp. Shapiro's specially trained division of 900 men led this advance, and took heavy losses from the retreating Wehrmacht over the last 20 miles (32 km), reaching the mine-protected roads to Auschwitz on 27 January 1945, having lost half of his division in the previous few days action:

At about 3 o’clock in the afternoon on 27th of January 100th infantry division commanded by General F. M. Krasavin liberated Auschwitz and Birkenau. An assault squad of the 106th infantry division commanded by major Anatoliy Pavlovych Shapiro was one of the first who broke into the city and into the camp. That was his squad that has cleared the approaches to the camp from the mines — after that major Shapiro has personally opened the gates of the Auschwitz-I camp and took part in suppressing the SS resistance. Birkenau camp was liberated on the 28th of January by the 107th infantry division commanded by colonel V. Y. Petrenko who used to visit Krasavin at the Auschwitz-I the day before that. About 650 corpses of the prisoners were lying around its territory, inside the barracks and near them — mostly it were women who died of exhaustion or were shot by the SS members the night before. About 9 thousand prisoners lived long enough to be liberated, 7 thousand of them were contained in three main camps — Birkenau, Auschwitz and Monowitz.

== After World War II ==
After the war, Shapiro worked in a military plant, but states he was persecuted for years because of being Jewish. In 1992, his entire family decided to emigrate to the United States, settling in Suffolk County, Long Island, New York. It was only at this time that he discovered that the Holocaust had cost 6 million Jewish lives. As a result, Shapiro began writing several books, mostly memoirs about the war. His last book is entitled Зловещий марафон (Ominous Marathon). Shapiro applied for American citizenship in 1996.

On 21 September 2006, Ukrainian President Viktor Yushchenko conferred on Shapiro the title of Hero of Ukraine.

Shapiro died on 8 October 2005 and is buried at Beth Moses cemetery in Suffolk County, Long Island, New York.
