= Andrii Zhuk =

Ukrainian military officer

Andrii Serhiyovych Zhuk (May 3, 1984, Zaporizhzhia - May 27, 2016, Bohdanivka, Volnovakha Raion, Donetsk Oblast) was a Ukrainian military officer, major of the Armed Forces of Ukraine, and commander of the 3rd battalion of the 72nd OMBr. He was a participant in the war in eastern Ukraine, and his call sign was "Mowgli". He was posthumously awarded the Hero of Ukraine.

== Biography ==
Andrii grew up in the village of Kamianka, Horodotsky District, Khmelnytskyi Region. His parents separated when he was 3 years old, so he and his sister were raised by his mother. From 1990 to 1999, he studied at Kamianka school, and then continued his studies at the Sataniv secondary school of grades I-III. In 2005, he graduated from the Bohdan Khmelnytskyi National Academy of the State Border Service of Ukraine.

Between 2013 and 2014, Andrii was the commander of the company's security platoon of the "South" Regional Center of Radio-Electronic Intelligence of the Ground Forces of the Ukrainian Armed Forces. After the tragic May events in 2014, he volunteered for the front.

Andrii Zhuk served in the 3rd Battalion of the 72nd Separate Guards Mechanized Brigade from August 2014, in the positions of platoon commander, company commander, battalion chief of staff, and battalion commander. He participated in battles near Starobesheve, Petrivskyi, Starognativka, in sector "M" in the Volnovaskyi district, demonstrating his strength, courage, and decisiveness as a commander. His superiors presented him for the Order of Bohdan Khmelnytskyi due to his bravery. He had aspirations to continue serving in the army and to further his studies, planning to apply to the National Defense University of Ukraine named after Ivan Chernyakhovsky.

The 3rd battalion was responsible for a 20-kilometer section of the defense line in the Volnovaskyi district of Donetsk region.

On the evening of May 27, 2016, the battalion's soldiers noticed an enemy sabotage and reconnaissance group near the forest plantation near Bohdanivka. Zhuk and two other servicemen left in a GAZ-66 car to assist. Zhuk, aiming to protect the less experienced fighters, went ahead to scout the enemy's advancement. However, the saboteurs had already set up an ambush. Three Ukrainian servicemen, including Zhuk, were wounded by the enemy's gunfire. The battalion returned fire, and neighbouring units provided fire support, causing the enemy to retreat. Zhuk was fatally wounded and died during evacuation to the hospital. A prolonged battle ensued, with the enemy covering their retreat with mortars, artillery, and a "Grad" installation.

According to his friends and colleagues, "For Kombat Beetle, this was typical behaviour. He always led his unit, as the most experienced. He was a magnet for trust and decency. A team of morally strong and spiritually robust individuals always formed around him. He never claimed any privileges, ate with his soldiers, and led a Spartan lifestyle. He was generous, did not tolerate sycophancy, and never tried to curry favour, nor allowed others to do the same with him."

On May 29, a farewell ceremony for Andrii Zhuk took place in Kyiv on Instytutskyi Street. The following day, he was buried with military honors in Khmelnytskyi, in the Alley of Heroes at Rakove Cemetery.

Captain Andrii Zhuk, who died in the east of Ukraine, was posthumously awarded the military rank of major for his courage and heroism. He is survived by his mother and sister.

== Awards and honors ==
He was posthumously awarded the title of Hero of Ukraine with the Order of the "Golden Star" (December 4, 2019) — for exceptional courage and heroism shown in the defense of the state sovereignty and territorial integrity of Ukraine, and for his loyalty to the military oath. He also received the Order of Bohdan Khmelnytskyi of the 1st degree (June 3, 2016, posthumously) — for personal courage, high professionalism, and selfless service to the Ukrainian people in the protection of the state sovereignty and territorial integrity of Ukraine.

== Literature ==
- Жук Андрій Сергійович («Мауглі») // Книга пам'яті полеглих за Україну.
- Комбат Андрій Жук (Альбом) // facebook Оксани Трапезун.
- Смерть в АТО. В бою загинув комбат з 72 бригади // «НВ», 28 травня 2016.
- Прес-офіцер розповів, за яких обставин загинув комбат 72-ї бригади // «5 канал», 28 травня 2016.
- Як загинув комбат 3-го батальйону 72-ї бригади Андрій Жук // «Цензор. НЕТ», 31 травня 2016
- Комбат, який не вернувся із бою… // Facebook 72 Гвардійська ОМБР, 29 травня 2016.
- Андюхи більше немає… // Facebook Устінової Олександри, 28 травня 2016.
- Прощання з комбатом 72 бригади Андрієм Жуком // Facebook Біла Церква. Час змін. Допомога Армії, 29 травня 2016.
- Прощання з комбатом «Мауглі» // «Український погляд», 30 травня 2016.
- У Хмельницькому попрощалися з легендарним комбатом «Мауглі» Андрій Жук героїчно загинув на Сході // «Depo.Хмельницький», 30 травня 2016.
- Україна втратила героя: Фото і спогади про комбата 72-ї бригади, якого вбили бойовики // «НВ», 31 травня 2016.
