= Nila Kriukova =

Ukrainian actress (1943–2018)

Hero of Ukraine Nila Kryukova
- Неоніла Крюкова
- Born: November 14, 1943; Popivka, Kirovohrad Oblast, Ukraine
- Died: October 5, 2018 (aged 74)
- Occupation: Actress
- Awards: People's Artist of Ukraine; Shevchenko National Prize; Order of Prince Yaroslav the Wise; Hero of Ukraine

Nila Valeryivnia Kryukova (14 November 1943 – 5 October 2018) was a Ukrainian actress. She was awarded a 1985 People's Artist of Ukraine, 1989 Shevchenko National Prize, 2006 Order of Prince Yaroslav the Wise, and 2008 Hero of Ukraine.

== Life ==
She graduated from the Kyiv State Institute of Theatre Arts. From 1967 to 1968, she was at the Nikolai Gogol Drama Theatre. Between 1970 and 1975, she was at the "Word" literary theatre of the National Writers' Union of Ukraine. She was an actress at the National Philharmonic of Ukraine. She starred in the movies "Na Kyjiwskomunaprjamku" (1968); "Propala hramota"(1972) and "Kaidaschewa sim'ja" (1996).
