= Vitalii Hrytsaienko =

Ukrainian soldier (1990–2022)

- Віталій Миколайович Грицаєнко
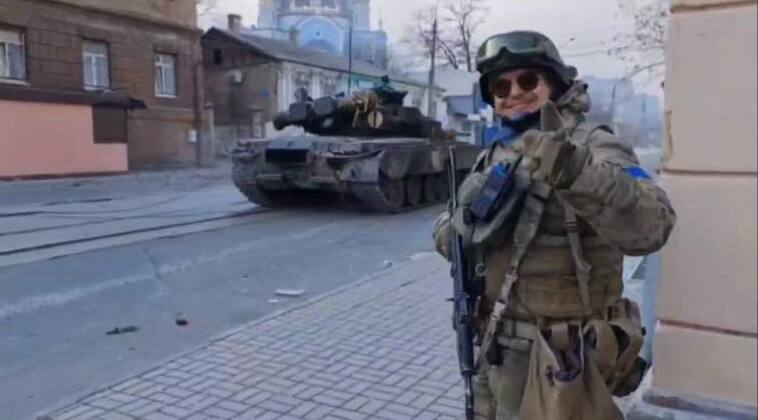
- Vitalii Hrytsaienko in 2022
- Born: August 3, 1990; Poltava, Ukrainian SSR, USSR
- Died: March 19, 2022 (aged 31); Mariupol
- Military career
- Allegiance: Ukraine
- Branch: Ukrainian Ground Forces
- Service years: 2014-2022
- Rank: Captain
- Conflicts: Russo-Ukrainian War; War in Donbas; Russian invasion of Ukraine
- Awards: Order of the Gold Star (posthumously)

Vitaly Mykolayovych Hrytsaienko (Ukrainian: Віталій Миколайович Грицаєнко; 3 August 1990, Poltava, Ukrainian SSR, USSR – 19 March 2022, Mariupol) was a captain (posthumously), deputy commander of a separate special unit of the Azov National Guard of Ukraine for combat and special training, a participant in the Russian-Ukrainian war who died during the Russian invasion of Ukraine in 2022, a Hero of Ukraine with the award of the Golden Star Order (2022, posthumously).

== Biography ==
Since 2014, he has participated in Joint Forces Operation and OOS as a volunteer (military rank — Gefreiter). He held the military position of gunner of the fire calculation of a mortar platoon in the city of Mariupol. During four years of service, he rose to the rank of senior lieutenant, was appointed to the position of deputy commander for combat and special training of a separate special purpose unit of the National Guard of Ukraine "Azov" National Guard.

From February 24, 2022, he participated in the defense of the city of Mariupol. During the battle on March 1, 2022, he personally destroyed an enemy tank with an RPG-22, and about two dozen Russian infantrymen with small arms. His subordinates destroyed three enemy tanks on fire within a minute of entering the battle. After that, the occupiers made an attempt to bypass the Ukrainian positions from the flank, but it was there that Senior Lieutenant Hrytsaenko laid anti-tank mines in advance, so three more Russian tanks were destroyed. The rest tried to retreat, but well-chosen positions and clearly assigned tasks enabled the guardsmen to destroy the rest of the enemy's armored vehicles. The enemy column was completely destroyed.

On March 15, 2022, Senior Lieutenant Vitaly Hrytsaenko was again tasked with blocking the movement of enemy forces. In the first 10 minutes, they destroyed three BTR-8s, four Tiger armored vehicles, one Lynx armored vehicle and three dozen Russian soldiers. For two hours, before the arrival of help, the guardsmen held their positions, and after a successful artillery operation, they launched a counterattack and forced the enemy to retreat. In that battle, Senior Lieutenant Hrytsaenko personally destroyed 2 Tiger anti-aircraft guns, before the detachment of manpower, and after a counterattack, he captured a Russian officer.

On the night of March 19, 2022, a group of "Azov" servicemen, which included senior lieutenant Vitaly Hrytsaenko, carried out a successful raid into the enemy's rear. As a result, an enemy command post was discovered and destroyed, one rear depot and one ammunition depot were blown up. The soldiers destroyed 1 tank, 2 armored personnel carriers and about a platoon of enemy manpower, mostly officers. During the fierce battle, the officer was seriously injured. A fragment of a mine hit him directly in the face, as a result of which he died instantly.

The farewell of the people of Azov to the deceased took place on November 3, 2022 at the "Atek" base in Kyiv. The next day, his body was cremated at Baikovo Cemetery. The farewell ceremony took place on November 6 in Poltava near the Assumption Cathedral.

== Awards ==
On 2 April 2022, he was awarded the highest national title of Ukraine, Hero of Ukraine, with Order of the Gold Star.
