= Vladyslav Ukrainets =

Ukrainian soldier (1999–2022)

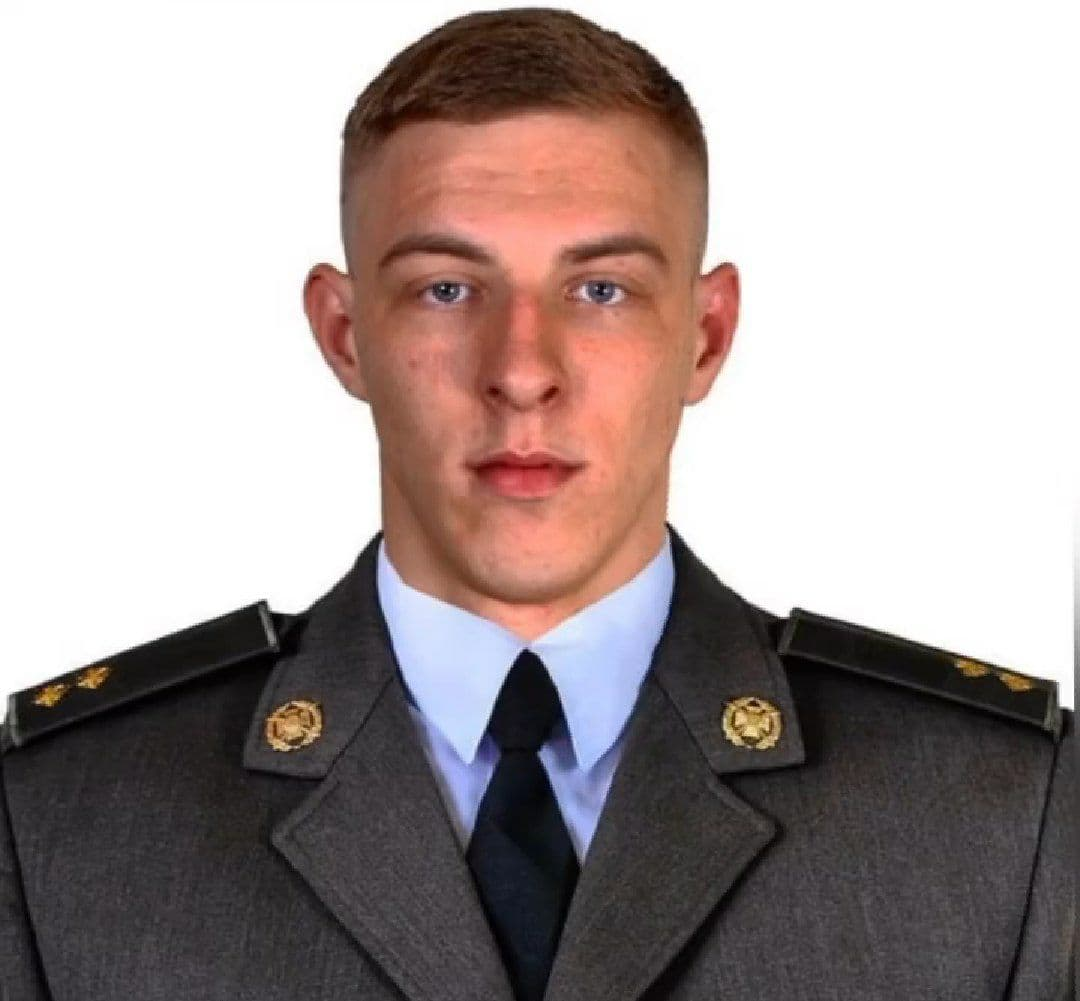
- Born: Vladyslav Petrovych Ukrainets; 5 December 1999; Khmilnyk, Vinnytsia Oblast, Ukraine
- Died: 24 February 2022 (aged 22); Antonivka Bridge, Antonivka, Ukraine
- Children: 1
- Military career
- Allegiance: Ukraine
- Branch: Armed Forces of Ukraine
- Rank: Lieutenant
- Conflicts: Russo-Ukrainian War; Russian invasion of Ukraine
- Awards: Order of the Gold Star (posthumously)

Vladyslav Petrovych Ukrainets (Ukrainian: Владислав Петрович Українець; 5 December 1999 – 24 February 2022) was a lieutenant in the Armed Forces of Ukraine, a participant in the Russian-Ukrainian war, and a Hero of Ukraine (posthumously, 2022).

== Biography ==
Vladyslav Petrovych Ukrainets attended secondary school in Khmilnyk (9 grades). He graduated from the Kamianets-Podilskyi Lyceum with enhanced military and physical training in Khmelnytskyi Oblast (2016) and the Hetman Petro Sahaidachnyi National Ground Forces Academy in Lviv (2020).

From 22 July 2020, he served as the commander of the 2nd Mechanized Platoon of the Mechanized Company in the military unit A2960 (10th Battalion, 59th Separate Motorized Infantry Brigade named after Yakov Hanzuk of the Ground Forces of the Armed Forces of Ukraine). He participated in combat operations and was involved in the Joint Forces Operation in Eastern Ukraine.

On the first day of the full-scale Russian Federation's offensive against Ukraine (24 February 2022), he covered the retreat of Ukrainian forces from the enemy's attack on his positions. He died on the Antonivsky Bridge in Kherson Oblast.

On 20 November 2022, he was buried in Khmilnyk, Khmelnytska Oblast, at the cemetery on Chaykovskoho Street.

Vladyslav is survived by his wife, mother, father, and son.

== Awards ==
On 2 March 2022, for personal bravery and heroism demonstrated in defense of Ukraine's state sovereignty and territorial integrity, and loyalty to the military oath, he was posthumously awarded the title of "Hero of Ukraine" with the Order of the "Golden Star".

== Honoring ==
In Khmilnyk, the name of the Hero was inscribed in the Book of Honor and Memory "Pride of Khmilnyk" (posthumously).
