= Dmytro Kaplunov =

Ukrainian colonel

Dmytro Vitaliyovych Kaplunov is a colonel of the Security Service of Ukraine, a participant in the Russian-Ukrainian war, the group commander of the Special Operations Center "A" department. Hero of Ukraine.

== Biography ==
He was born in a military family in the small town of Velyki Mosty, in the Lviv Region. He graduated from the 9th grade of Sosnivka school #13, after which he moved to Kharkiv, where he continued his studies at school #153 in the city of Kharkiv. Father and younger brother are also military personnel (father is a border guard).

In 2002, he graduated with honors from The Bohdan Khmelnytskyi National Academy of the State Border Service of Ukraine. From 2002 to 2004, he served in the KNC of the DPSU in the position of deputy company commander. In 2004, he passed the test and became an employee of the CSO "A" of the SBU (canine department). He has been a participant in the Russian-Ukrainian war since the first days.

== Awards ==
The title of Hero of Ukraine with the award of the Golden Star Order (December 3, 2019)
