= Vitalii Movchan =

Ukrainian soldier (1998–2022)

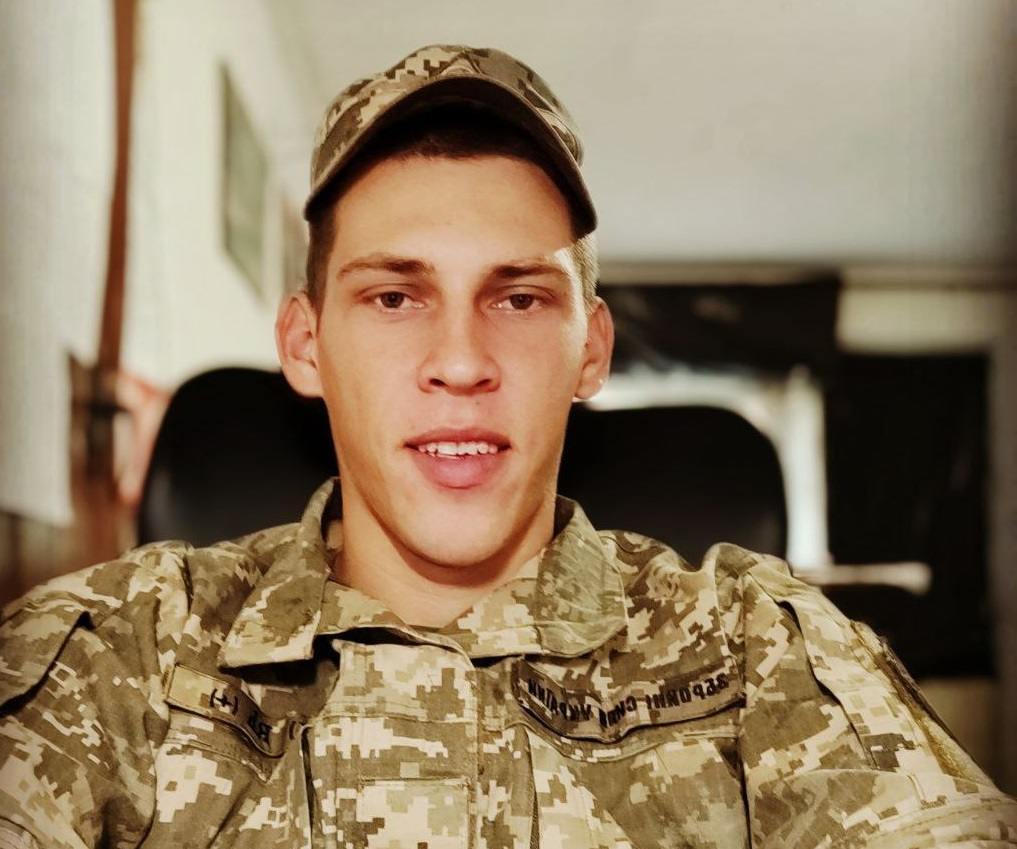
- Born: Vitalii Anatoliiovych Movchan; 17 March 1998; Kupiansk, Kharkiv Oblast, Ukraine
- Died: 24 February 2022 (aged 23); Trokhizbenka, Luhansk Oblast, Ukraine
- Alma mater: Ivan Kozhedub National Air Force University
- Military career
- Allegiance: Ukraine
- Branch: Ukrainian Ground Forces
- Service years: 2016–2022
- Rank: Lieutenant
- Conflicts: Russo-Ukrainian War; Russian invasion of Ukraine
- Awards: Order of the Gold Star (posthumously)

Vitalii Anatoliiovych Movchan (Ukrainian: Віталій Анатолійович Мовчан; 17 March 1998 – 24 February 2022) was a Ukrainian military service member (lieutenant). He was awarded the title of Hero of Ukraine (posthumously) in 2022.

== Russian invasion of Ukraine 2022 ==
Lieutenant Vitalii Movchan led an anti-aircraft missile system unit, which was on active duty on 24 February 2022, during the Russian invasion, providing cover for local civilians and troops involved in the Joint Forces Operation (JFO). They were among the first anti-aircraft units to engage the enemy, despite being significantly outnumbered. When an airborne target approached their position, which the crew identified as an enemy aircraft and "locked on," Vitalii made his first combat launch of an anti-aircraft missile around 6:50 am. Shortly after, he triumphantly reported over the radio, "Target destroyed!" It was later revealed that Vitalii's crew "neutralized" a Russian two-seat fourth-generation multirole fighter jet, the Su-30, with their first shot.

His subordinates, many of whom were much older than him, testified that Lieutenant Movchan professionally, calmly, and selflessly directed the battle, inspiring the crew by personal example. Their anti-aircraft missile system actively maneuvered and changed positions. Later, they successfully destroyed an enemy unmanned aerial vehicle with another precise launch. However, it became clear that the enemy's aviation started hunting for the Ukrainian anti-aircraft unit and its crew. At around 4 pm, two Russian attack helicopters, Mi-24s, approached their temporary firing position at an extremely low altitude and launched unguided rockets at it. Vitalii Movchan was killed in action near the village of Triokhizbenka in Luhansk Oblast, while his subordinates sustained severe injuries.

He was buried on 18 March 2022, at Fedorivske Cemetery in Volodymyr, Volyn Oblast.

== Awards ==
Vitalii Movchan was posthumously awarded the title of Hero of Ukraine with the Order of the Gold Star on 28 February 2022, for "personal courage and heroism demonstrated in defense of Ukraine's state sovereignty and territorial integrity, and for his loyalty to the military oath."
