= Oleksandr Lukyanovych =

Ukrainian soldier (1989–2022)

- Born: Oleksandr Volodymyrovych Lukyanovych; 20 February 1989; Postupel village, Volyn Oblast, Ukraine
- Died: 25 February 2022 (aged 33); Near Kyiv, Ukraine
- Military career
- Allegiance: Ukraine
- Branch: Armed Forces of Ukraine
- Rank: Soldier
- Conflicts: Russo-Ukrainian War; Russian invasion of Ukraine
- Awards: Order of the Gold Star (posthumously)

Oleksandr Volodymyrovych Lukyanovych (Ukrainian: Олександр Володимирович Лук'янович; February 20, 1989, Postupel village, Volyn Oblast – February 25, 2022, Kyiv Oblast) was a Ukrainian military personnel, a soldier of the 14th Separate Mechanized Brigade of the Armed Forces of Ukraine, and a participant in the Russian–Ukrainian war. He is a Hero of Ukraine (2022, posthumously).

== Biography ==
Oleksandr Lukyanovych was born on February 20, 1989, in Postupel village, Volyn Oblast.

He worked as an electrician for the railway. Since 2021, he had been serving in the 14th Separate Mechanized Brigade under a contract.

During a battle near Kyiv, he disabled up to thirty enemy vehicles. On February 25, 2022, he suffered a fatal injury in a Russian airstrike.

He was buried in Volodymyr, Volyn Oblast. He is survived by his wife, daughter, and young son.

== Awards ==
On March 2, 2022, he was posthumously awarded the title of Hero of Ukraine with the Order of the Gold Star for personal courage and heroism demonstrated in defense of Ukraine's state sovereignty and territorial integrity, as well as for his loyalty to the military oath.
