= Andrii Herus =

Ukrainian soldier

Andrii Gerus
- Born: Andrii Andriiovych Herus; 10 November 1995 (age 30); Kremenchuk, Ukraine
- Military career
- Allegiance: Ukraine
- Branch: Ukrainian Air Force
- Rank: Captain
- Conflicts: Russo-Ukrainian War; Russian invasion of Ukraine
- Awards: Order of the Gold Star

Andrii Andriiovych Herus (Ukrainian: Андрій Андрійович Герус; born November 10, 1995) is a Ukrainian military personnel, captain of the Ukrainian Armed Forces Air Force, MiG-29 fighter pilot, and participant in the Russian-Ukrainian war. He is a Hero of Ukraine (2022).

In 2022, he was included in Forbes "30 Under 30: Faces of the Future" ranking.

== Biography ==
Andrii Herus was born on November 10, 1995.

He studied at Gymnasium No. 8 in Kremenchuk and a higher education aviation institution. He serves in the tactical aviation brigade of the Air Command "Center."

He has conducted a significant number of combat sorties to cover the airspace of Kyiv, Kyiv Oblast, and Ukraine. He shot down an enemy Il-76 over Kropyvnytskyi, Kirovohrad Oblast, preventing the landing of Russian troops with weapons.

== Awards ==
He was awarded the title of "Hero of Ukraine" with the Order of the Golden Star on February 28, 2022, for personal courage and heroism demonstrated in defense of Ukraine's state sovereignty and territorial integrity, as well as for his loyalty to the military oath.

He was also granted the honorary citizenship of Kremenchuk in 2022.
