= Vera Roik =

Ukrainian embroiderer (1911–2010)

Hero of Ukraine Vera Roik
- Occupation: School teacher
- Awards: Hero of Ukraine; Order of Princess Olga

Vera Sergeevna Roik (Ukrainian: Ві́ра Сергі́ївна Ро́їк, 1911–2010) was a Ukrainian embroiderer.

The Museum of Ukrainian Embroidery which operated from 2012 until 2015 was named after her.

In 2006 she was honoured as a Hero of Ukraine for "the development of Ukrainian culture, the establishment of the traditions of national decorative and applied art, many years of selfless creative and pedagogical activity".
