= 80th Air Assault Brigade =

Ukrainian Air Assault Forces unit

- 80-та окрема десантно-штурмова Галицька бригада
- Sleeve patch of the Brigade
- Active: 1954 – present
- Country: Ukraine
- Branch: Ukrainian Air Assault Forces
- Role: Air assault forces
- Size: Brigade
- Garrison/HQ: Lviv, Lviv oblast
- Motto: No one but us!
- Anniversaries: 19 December (formation)
- Engagements: Soviet–Afghan War First Nagorno-Karabakh War Operation Iraqi Freedom War in Donbas 2022 Russian invasion of Ukraine; Battle of Bakhmut; 2023 Ukrainian counteroffensive; 2024 Kursk incursion
- Decorations: For Courage and Bravery
- Website: https://www.facebook.com/80brigade

Commanders
- Current commander: Pavlo Rozlach

Insignia
- Flag

The 80th Air Assault Brigade "Halychyna" (Note: Ukrainian: 80-та окрема десантно-штурмова Галицька бригада; 80 ОДШБр; Military Unit Number A0284) is an airmobile formation of the Ukrainian Air Assault Forces. The brigade traces its history back to the 80th Airborne Regiment of the Soviet Union, formed in 1955 as part of the Soviet airborne's 7th Guards Airborne Division. Four years later, the regiment transferred to the 104th Guards Airborne Division. It participated in Operation Whirlwind in 1956 and Operation Danube in 1968. In 1979, the regiment was disbanded and used to form the 39th and 40th Separate Air Assault Brigades of the Soviet Army. The 39th Separate Air Assault Brigade became the 224th Training Center after transfer back to the Soviet airborne in 1990. The training center was taken over by Ukraine in 1992 with the dissolution of the Soviet Union and became the 6th Separate Airmobile Brigade in 1995. In 1999, the brigade was reorganized into the 80th Airmobile Regiment, part of the 13th Army Corps. In 2013, the regiment was upgraded and became a brigade. The brigade fought in the War in Donbas, and was redesignated as an air assault brigade in 2015.

== History ==
=== 80th Airborne Regiment ===
The 80th Airborne Regiment was formed on 3 May 1955 in the Lithuanian SSR, the only non-Guards Soviet airborne regiment. The regiment celebrates its anniversary on 19 December. It originally formed part of the 7th Guards Airborne Division of the Soviet Airborne Forces at Gaižiūnai. The regiment fought in Operation Whirlwind, the Soviet invasion of Hungary, and landed in Budapest on 4 November 1956. In 1959, it transferred to the 104th Guards Airborne Division and was based in Baku. On 22 February 1968, for its achievements in training, the Regiment was awarded the Order of the Red Star. Division headquarters was at Kirovabad (now Gyandzha) in the Azerbaijan SSR. Carey Schofield writes that the 104th Guards Airborne Division "had only two regiments from 1975 to 1980 after the disbandment of the 80th Guards [sic] Airborne Regiment in Baku". In August 1968, the regiment participated in Operation Danube, the crushing of the Prague Spring.

=== 39th Separate Air Assault Brigade ===
On 3 August 1979, the regiment was disbanded. The 39th Separate Air Assault Brigade was formed from elements of the regiment at Khyriv in Lviv Oblast on 19 December. The 40th Separate Air Assault Brigade was formed in Mykolaiv from other parts of the regiment. In January 1980, the 1st Battalion of the 39th Separate Air Assault Brigade was deployed to Termez for fighting in the Soviet–Afghan War and became the 48th Separate Air Assault Battalion. The battalion was absorbed by the 66th Separate Motor Rifle Brigade in May. In 1986, the 39th Brigade participated in the Chernobyl cleanup. Between January and April 1990, the 39th Separate Air Assault Brigade was deployed to restore order in during the first Nagorno-Karabakh War.

=== 1990s ===
In June 1990 the 39th Separate Air Assault Brigade became the 224th Training Center of the Soviet Airborne Forces. The brigade included the 1st and 2nd Airborne Training Battalions, as well as an artillery training battalion. In May 1992 the training center became part of the Ukrainian Armed Forces. In September 1993, the 224th Training Center was renamed the 39th Separate Airborne Brigade. It became the 6th Separate Airmobile Brigade on 1 November 1995. The brigade participated in Exercise Peaceshield in 1995 and 1996. In December 1999, the brigade was reorganized into the 80th Airmobile Regiment.

=== 80th Airmobile Regiment ===
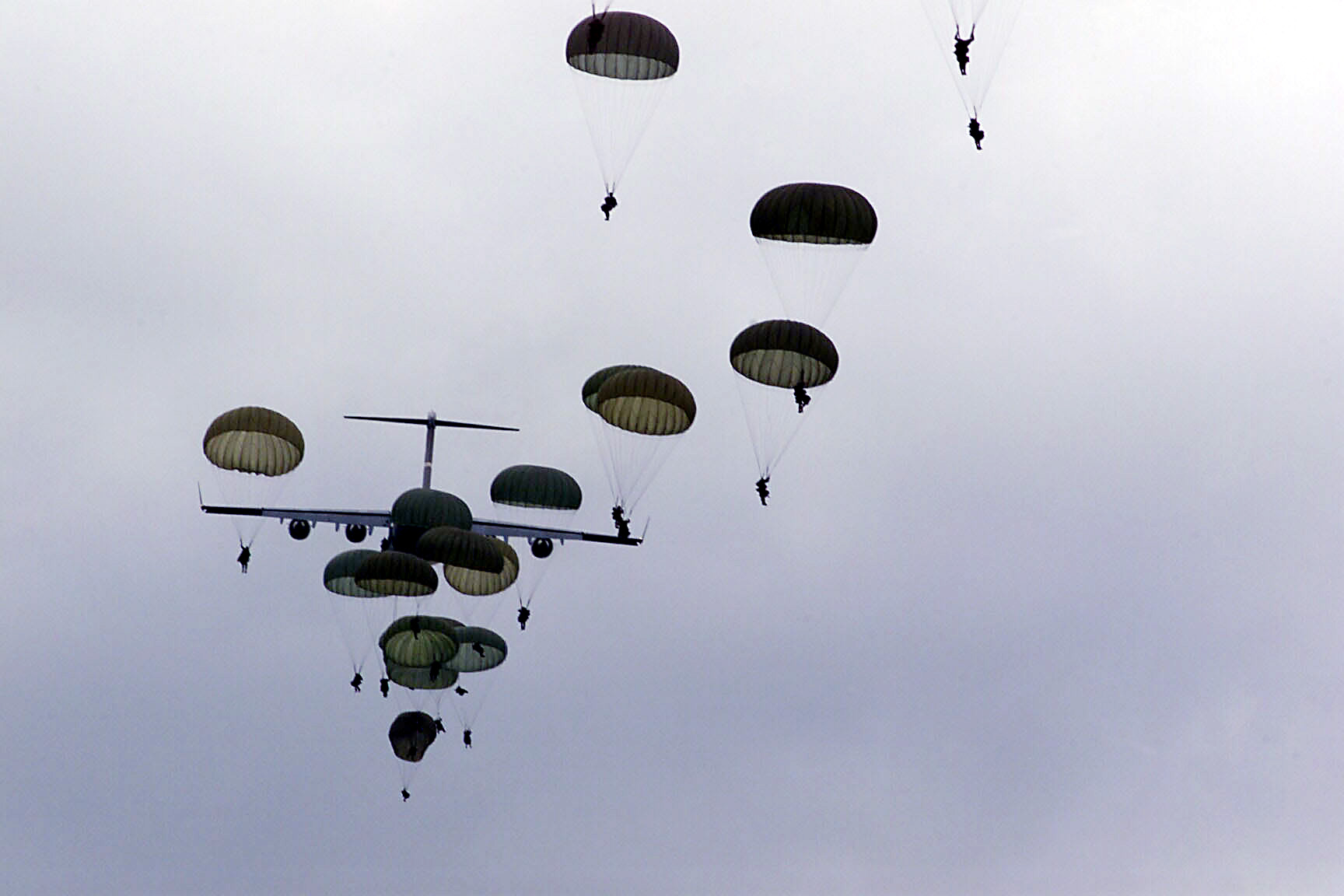
Troops of the 80th Airmobile Regiment parachute from a C-17 during Exercise Peaceshield 2000

In July 2000, the regiment participated in Exercise Peaceshield 2000 with US troops and forces from other countries. In April 2003, the regiment was moved to Lviv. In 2004, the regiment was scheduled to be sent to Iraq as part of the Ukrainian contingent there. An airmobile battalion, mortar batteries, an engineer platoon, a chemical defense platoon, communications company and military police company were drawn from the regiment and deployed to Iraq on 15 May 2005 as the 81st Tactical Group. The troops were part of Multinational Division Central-South and were withdrawn at the end of the year, the last Ukrainian unit in Iraq. In 2006, the regiment contributed troops to the Kosovo Force UkrPolBat joint Ukrainian-Polish peacekeeping battalion.

A mortar barrel rupture during a tactical exercise of the regiment's 1st mortar battery mortally wounded four soldiers on 6 August 2008. On 27 May 2010, the regiment was visited by then-President Viktor Yanukovych.

On 2 September 2013, the unit's 3rd Battalion Tactical Group was formed.

=== 80th Airmobile Brigade ===
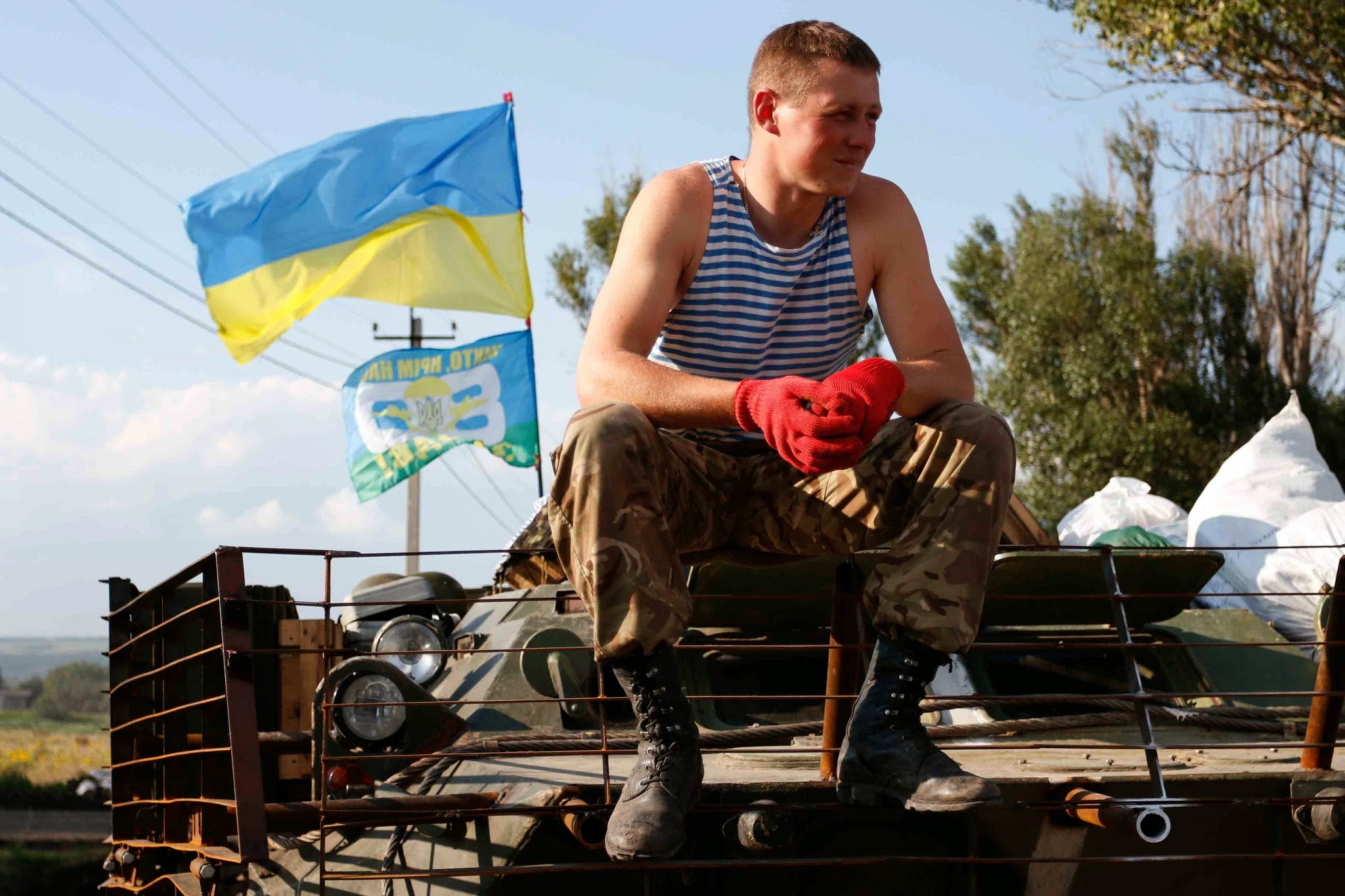
80th Airmobile Brigade soldier resting on the top of a BTR-80 in the aftermath of the Siege of Sloviansk

On 25 November 2013, the regiment became the 80th Airmobile Brigade. In the spring of 2014, after the annexation of Crimea by the Russian Federation, the brigade covered the Ukraine–Russia border in Poltava and Sumy Oblasts. Between 7–8 April 2014, the brigade relocated to defend the Luhansk Airport. The brigade defended the airport until September, when a Russian attack forced them to retreat. The brigade fought in the battle for Shchastia in June 2014. During a night battle on 17–18 June, 11 personnel from the brigade and the 128th Mountain Brigade were killed. On 1 August, the brigade ambushed a separatist column moving from Sukhodilsk to Luhansk, destroying seven tanks, five armored vehicles, 3 BM-21 Grad MLRS, seven cars with ammunition and killing 120–150 separatists. On 5 September, personnel from the brigade and the Aidar Battalion were ambushed between Luhansk and Metalist at Vesela Hora. 40 bodies of men from both units were returned by the separatists after negotiations. 28 unidentified bodies were buried at Starobilsk on 2 October. On the night of 13–14 October, the brigade reconnaissance group repulsed attacks by the separatist Don Battalion, which was attempting to penetrate Ukrainian territory at the 32nd Checkpoint. On 28 October, seven brigade personnel were released from captivity by the separatists.

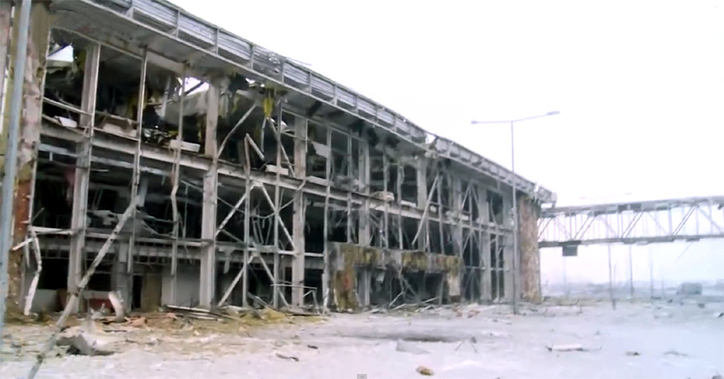
Donetsk Airport New Terminal ruins, which the 80th Airmobile Brigade's 3rd Battalion defended during January 2015

The brigade's 3rd Battalion fought in the Second Battle of Donetsk Airport in January 2015. The unit became known as the "Cyborgs" along with other Ukrainian units defending Donetsk Airport. Along with the 90th Separate Airborne Battalion of the 81st Airmobile Brigade, the unit was forced to retreat from the new airport terminal, reportedly under heavy artillery fire and chemical attack. Over 50 soldiers from both units died in the fighting between 19 and 21 January. After the Ukrainian withdrawal from the airport on 21 January, at least 15 soldiers from the brigade were captured by the separatists. Several of the soldiers were subjected to frequent beatings.

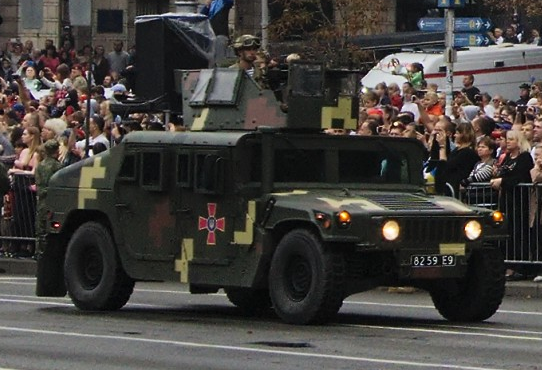
A Humvee of the brigade during the 2016 Kyiv Ukrainian Independence Day Parade

Since at least May 2015, the brigade has been equipped with 28 M1114 Up-Armored Humvees.

=== 80th Air Assault Brigade ===
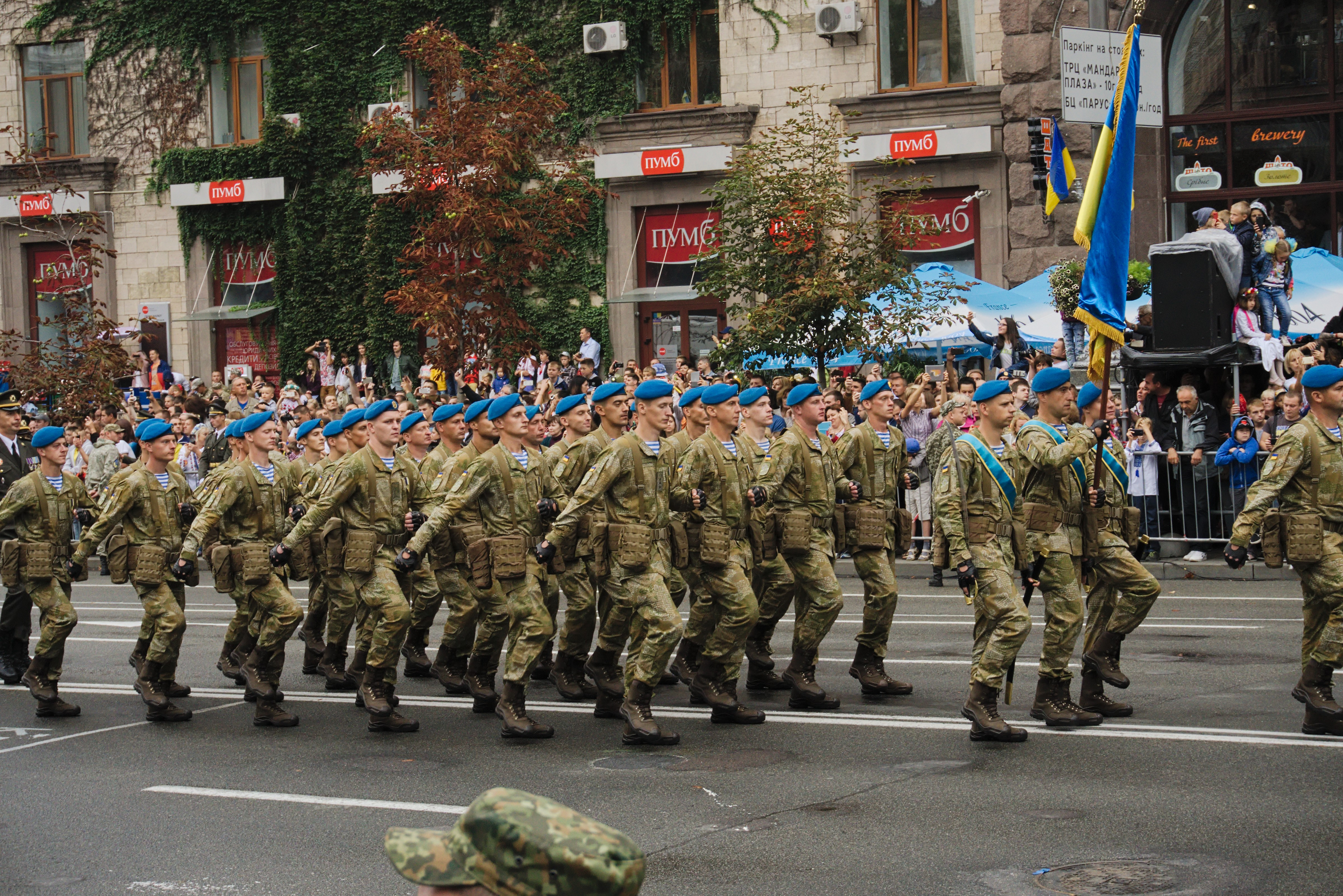
Men of the brigade in Kyiv on 24 August 2016

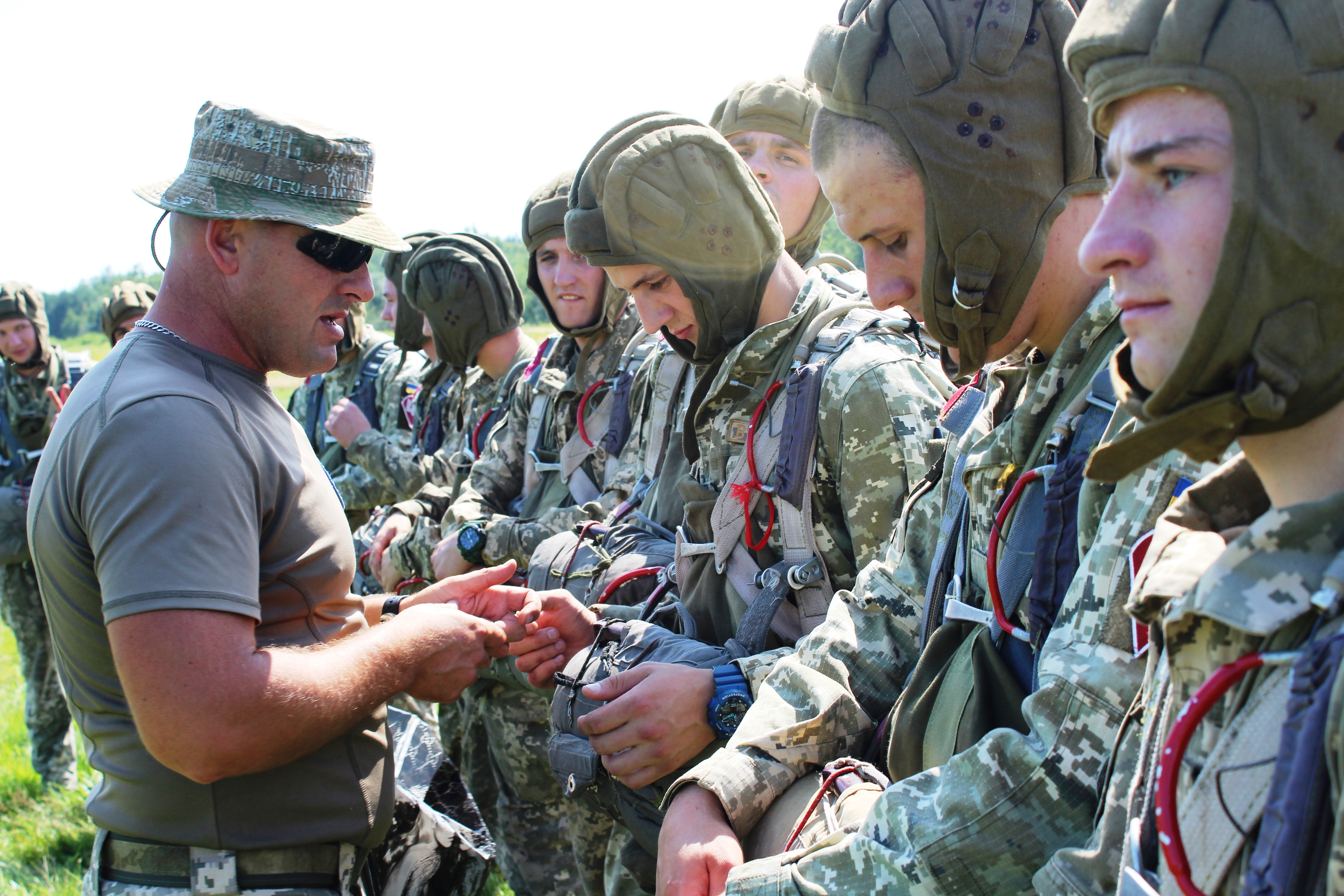
80th Airborne Brigade training on 13 August 2018

On 24 August 2015, President Petro Poroshenko presented the brigade a battle flag for bravery and courage during a review in Kyiv on the 24th anniversary of Ukrainian independence; by this time, it had been redesignated as the 80th Separate Air Assault Brigade. Brigade Junior sergeant and medic Igor Zinych was posthumously awarded the title Hero of Ukraine on 14 October for his actions in caring for the wounded at Donetsk Airport. On 18 November 2015, the brigade's Order of the Red Star award was removed as part of a general removal of Soviet awards and decorations from Ukrainian military units. In June 2016, a platoon of the brigade participated in the multinational Anakonda 16 exercise at Nowa Dęba training ground, attached to a Polish battalion. In August 2016, the brigade's mortar platoon and some of its staff officers participated in the multinational Flaming Thunder exercises Pabradė Training Area in Lithuania. On 23 August, former brigade commander Andriy Kovalchuk was awarded the titile Hero of Ukraine for his leadership.

As of June 2017, elements of the brigade, equipped with Humvees, defended positions at Pisky, near Donetsk Airport. On 2 August, brigade commander Colonel Volodymyr Shvorak stated that the losses of the brigade in the Donbas amounted to 104 killed, seven missing, and 542 wounded, most of which were suffered during the defense of the Luhansk airport in late 2014.

==== Operations in southern Ukraine (2022) ====
Early into the Russian invasion of Ukraine, units of the 80th Brigade took part in combat in the Kherson region, near the Antonivka bridge and the village of Kyselivka. Units under the command of Oleh Apostol escaped encirclement at Kherson on 26–27 February.

Elements of the 80th Brigade also took part in combat near the Kakhovka hydroelectric power plant and the villages of Kozatske and Mykolaiivka. 80th Brigade units took up the defense of Shylova Balka near Nova Kakhovka, participating in battles for the area until 28 February 2022. At least 12 members of the brigade have been identified as having been killed in action during the fighting at this location, including a deputy commander of the 3rd Battalion and a platoon commander in the 1st Battalion.

Units of the brigade under the command of Oleh Apostol took part in the defense of the city of Voznesensk in Mykolaiv region in March 2022. Units of the brigade continued operating in the Mykolaiv region in March 2022 and in southern Ukraine the next month.

After the defense of Voznesensk, units of the 80th Brigade under Apostol's command went on the offensive and captured the villages of Arkhanhel's'ke, Katerynivka, Kashpero-Mykolaiivka, Novopetrivka Novofontanka, Dobrokam'yanka, Inhulka, and Vynohradivka. The 80th Brigade also took part in combat near the villages of Sukhyi Yelanets, Bilozirka, Pervomaiske, and Trudoliubivka. Units of the brigade went on to reach Yavkyne and Snihurivka, stopping their advance after capturing the villages of Kobzartsi, Chervona Dolyna, and Shyroke.

==== Operations in eastern Ukraine (2022–2024) ====
Units of the 80th Air Assault Brigade took part in operations to repel Russian pontoon crossings across the Siverskyi Donets river toward the village of Bilohorivka in the Luhansk region. The 80th Brigade also took part in combat near the villages of Dronivka and Serebrianka.

By May 2022, units of the brigade were involved in combat near Bakhmut in the Donetsk Oblast. In June 2022, units under the command of Apostol were defending against a Russian breakthrough from Popasna in the direction of Bakhmut and Soledar. 80th Brigade units took part in combat near the villages of Zolotarivka, Verkhn'okam'yans'ke, and Bohorodychne.

In September 2022, as part of a major Ukrainian offensive in the Kharkiv region, the 3rd Battalion Tactical Group of the 80th Air Assault Brigade took part in the capture of the settlements of Oskil, Yatskivka, Pisky-Radkivski, and Borova.

The 3rd Battalion Tactical Group of the 80th Air Assault Brigade was reorganized into the 82nd Air Assault Brigade in December 2022.

In February 2023 the brigade took part in the battle of Bakhmut, and was later involved in operations on the Bakhmut front during the 2023 Ukrainian counteroffensive; it took part in the recapture of the village of Klischiivka.

Units of the 80th Brigade took part in urban battles in Bakhmut in April 2023. The brigade remained on the Bakhmut front in May and June 2023.

By August 2023 it was reported that the brigade was taking part in combat near the village of Klishchiivka. With the support of other Ukrainian units, the 80th Brigade took control of the village in September 2023. Units of the brigade continued to operate within Klishchiivka during December 2023.

In February 2024, units of the brigade, including its 3rd Battalion, were active on the Bakhmut front, including near Klishchiivka. Units of the brigade remained on the Bakhmut front in March 2024 and as of April 2024, they were still positioned near Klishchiivka.

During June 2024, some units of the 80th Brigade remained stationed in Klishchiivka, where they were repelling Russian assaults aimed at enveloping Chasiv Yar from the south. Units of the brigade continued fighting on the Chasiv Yar front into the next month.

By February 2024, some units of the 80th Brigade had been deployed to the Mar'iinka front. In April 2024, some units of the brigade were involved in fighting near Krasnohorivka, Units of the 80th Brigade reportedly remained active on the Mar'iinka front during July 2024.

==== Operations in the Kursk Oblast (2024–2025) ====
In August 2024, the brigade was among the first Ukrainian units to enter Russia's Kursk Oblast as part of the Ukrainian operation there. On 6 August 2024, a few hours into the operation, the brigade had broken the Russian defensive line, assaulted and destroyed the Russian border checkpoint at Sudzha and captured over fifty of its defenders. During the first few days of the operation, the 80th Brigade took part in combat on the outskirts of Sudzha. On 10 August, units of the brigade captured a Russian T-80BVM tank near the village of Goncharovka near Sudzha.

In December 2024, members of Russia's 11th Air Assault Brigade were captured after attempting to storm a village held by the 80th Brigade in Kursk Oblast.

The 80th Air Assault Brigade remained in Kursk until the 2025 Ukrainian withdrawal from the region.

=== Deployments ===
Soldiers from the brigade have served in Afghanistan, Nagorno-Karabakh, Kosovo, Sierra Leone, and Iraq.

== Structure ==
As of 2024, the brigade's structure is as follows:

- 80th Air Assault Brigade, Lviv
  - Brigade’s Headquarters
  - 1st Air Assault Battalion
  - 2nd Air Assault Battalion
  - 3rd Air Assault Battalion
  - Tank Company
  - Artillery Group (Brigade artillery group equipped with 2S1 self-propelled artillery vehicles).
    - Headquarters & Target Acquisition Battery
    - 1st Self-propelled Artillery Battalion
    - 2nd Self-propelled Artillery Battalion
    - Rocket Artillery Group
    - Anti-Tank Group
  - Anti-Aircraft Defense Battalion
  - Reconnaissance Company
  - Aerial Reconnaissance Group "Foxtrot".
    - Strike FPV Unit "Griffin"
  - Engineer Battalion
  - Logistic Company
  - Maintenance Company
  - Signal Company
  - Radar Company
  - Medical Company
  - Chemical, Biological, Radiological and Nuclear Defense Company

== Past commanders ==
- Colonel Mykhailo Koval (26 May 1992–1 September 1995)
- Colonel Mykola Novak (September 1995–October 1998)
- Colonel Ihor Stelmakh (October 1998–June 2000)
- Lieutenant Colonel Vasyl Surovniev (June 2000–February 2001)
- Lieutenant Colonel Mykola Tkachenko (February 2001–September 2004)
- Colonel Ihor Overin – (September 2004–January 2007)
- Lieutenant Colonel (later Colonel) Viktor Kopachynskii (2008–March 2015)
- Colonel Andrii Kovalchuk (2015–March 2016)
- Colonel Volodymyr Shvorak (2016–2022)
- Colonel Ihor Skybiuk (2022–2023)
- Colonel Emil Ishkulov (2023–2024)
- Colonel Pavlo Rozlach (2024–present)
