= Yurii Huliak =

Ukrainian soldier

- Юрій Гуляк
- Born: Yurii Vasylovych Huliak
- Military career
- Allegiance: Ukraine
- Branch: Armed Forces of Ukraine
- Rank: Captain
- Nickname: Hyria (Гиря)
- Unit: 80th Air Assault Brigade
- Conflicts: Russo-Ukrainian War
- Awards: Order of Bohdan Khmelnytskyi

Yurii Vasylovych Huliak (Ukrainian: Юрій Васильович Гуляк) is a Ukrainian soldier, Captain of the 80th Air Assault Brigade of the Armed Forces of Ukraine, a participant in the Russian-Ukrainian war.

In 2023, he was included in the Forbes 30 Under 30: Creators of the Future rating.

== Biography ==
Huliak serves as a battalion commander of the 80th Air Assault Brigade. He is one of the youngest commanders of the Armed Forces of Ukraine.

During the full-scale Russian invasion, he took part in the battles for Nova Kakhovka, Voznesensk, Bakhmut, Lysychansk, and Kharkiv Oblast.

His great-grandmother Yustyna was an UPA liaison officer.

== Awards ==
- Order of Bohdan Khmelnytskyi, 1st class (16 October 2023)
- Order of Bohdan Khmelnytskyi, 2nd class (28 September 2022)
- Order of Bohdan Khmelnytskyi, 3rd class (8 June 2022)

== Military ranks ==
- Captain
- Senior lieutenant
