= Oleh Apostol =

Ukrainian military personnel (born 1987)

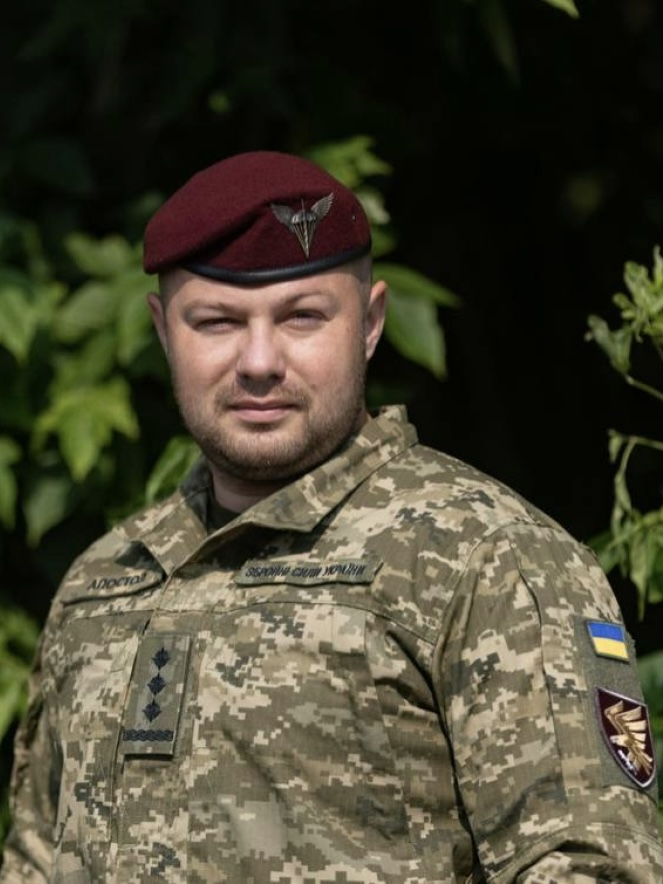
- Native name: Олег Апостол
- Nickname: Formosa
- Born: Oleh Orestovych Apostol; April 17, 1987 (age 39); Ivano-Frankivsk, Ukrainian SSR
- Allegiance: Ukraine
- Branch: Ukrainian Air Assault Forces
- Rank: Brigadier general
- Commands: Commander of the Air Assault Forces
- Conflicts: Russo-Ukrainian War
- Awards: Hero of Ukraine

Oleh Orestovych Apostol (Ukrainian: Олег Орестович Апостол, born 17 April 1987) is a Ukrainian Air Assault Forces brigadier general. He has been the commander of the Air Assault Forces since 2025.

== Biography ==
He was born on 17 April 1987 in Ivano-Frankivsk.

In 2008, he graduated from the Hetman Petro Sahaidachnyi National Ground Forces Academy, specialising in "combat application and management of airborne troops".

In 2014, he took part in the combat in eastern Ukraine. Together with other soldiers, he entered Mykolaivka in Donetsk Oblast four times and carried out assault operations on the fortified areas of the Russian occupiers. At that time, the military drew fire upon themselves in order to reveal the enemy's firing positions and destroy them with heavy fire. On 5 July 2014, he was awarded the Order of Bohdan Khmelnytsky III degree for the liberation of Sloviansk and other settlements.

=== As 80th Brigade commander (2018–2022) ===
As of 2018, he was the commander of an air assault battalion of the 80th Air Assault Brigade.

Аt the beginning of the 2022 Russian invasion of Ukraine, Apostol commanded the 2nd Battalion of the 80th Air Assault Brigade. During 26–27 February, he led a company out of encirclement at Kherson, and in March, he led the defense of the city of Voznesensk in the Mykolaiv region. Later, a dozen settlements in the Mykolaiv region were recaptured under Apostol's command, and a Russian breakthrough near Snihurivka and Yavkyne was prevented.

In June 2022, Apostol took part in the defense against a Russian breakthrough from Popasna in the direction of Bakhmut and Soledar.

=== As 95th Brigade commander (2022–2024) ===
Later, Apostol was made brigade commander of the 95th Air Assault Brigade, and in September 2022, led units of the brigade which were taking part in a major counteroffensive in the Kharkiv region. Apostol oversaw an assault by 95th Brigade units towards Kreminna, which fell short 2 kilometres (1.2 mi) of the city because only two of the brigade's four battalions were available for the advance. Apostol's units then shifted to the defense of Ukrainian positions on the Kreminna front.

In the summer of 2024, he commanded the 95th Brigade on the Toretsk front. Since August 2024, he commanded his brigade in the Ukrainian operation in Russia's Kursk region, taking part in the capture of the village of Malaya Loknya.

=== Higher commands (2024–present) ===
On 29 November 2024, he was appointed Deputy Commander-in-Chief of the Armed Forces of Ukraine.

On 26 February 2025, he was promoted to brigadier general. On 3 June 2025, he was appointed commander of the Ukrainian Air Assault Forces, replacing Major General Ihor Skybiuk.

In February 2026, Apostol was promoted to the rank of brigadier general.

== Award ==
- Hero of Ukraine (18 February 2024)
- Cross of Military Merit (14 October 2022)
- Order of Bohdan Khmelnytsky 1st class (4 June 2022)
- Order of Bohdan Khmelnytsky 2nd class (14 March 2022)
- Order of Bohdan Khmelnytsky 3rd class (5 July 2014)
