= Ihor Skybiuk =

Ukrainian military officer (born 1976)

Hero of Ukraine Ihor Skybiuk
- Ігор Скибюк
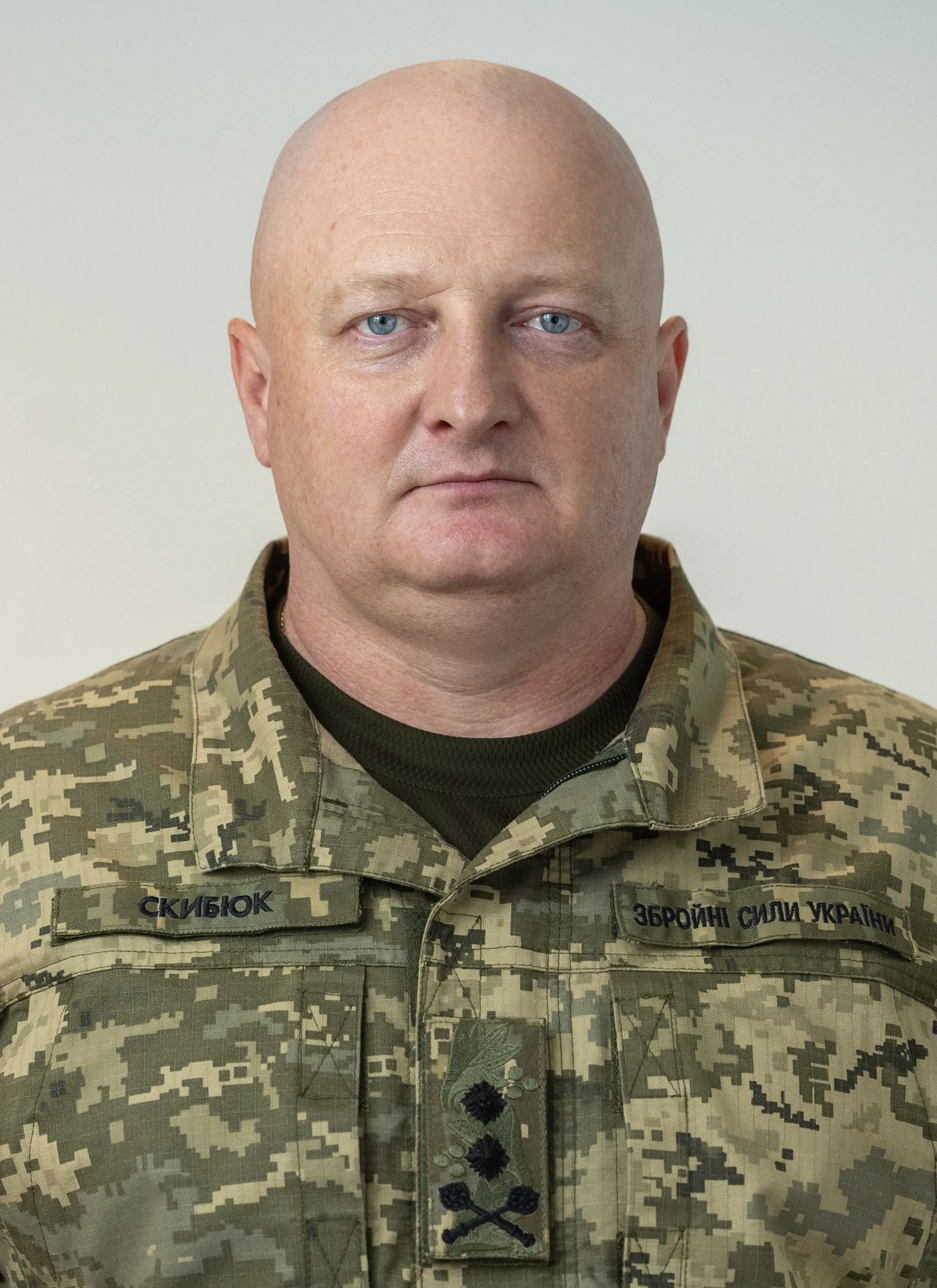
- Born: Ihor Anatoliiovych Skybiuk; 10 October 1976 (age 50); Konotop, Sumy Oblast, Ukrainian SSR
- Education: Odesa Military Academy; National Defense Academy of Ukraine
- Military career
- Allegiance: Ukraine
- Branch: Ukrainian Air Assault Forces
- Service years: 1998–present
- Rank: Major General
- Commands: Chief of the General Staff; Commander of the Air Assault Forces
- Conflicts: War in the Donbas; Russo-Ukrainian war
- Awards: Hero of Ukraine

Major General Ihor Anatoliiovych Skybiuk (Ukrainian: І́гор Анато́лійович Скибю́к, born 10 October 1976) is a Ukrainian Air Assault Forces officer who has been the Chief of the General Staff of the Ukrainian Armed Forces since 2026. He was commander of the Air Assault Forces from 2024 to 2025, and is a recipient of the title Hero of Ukraine and the Order of Bohdan Khmelnytsky.

== Early life and education ==
Skybiuk was born on 10 October 1976 in Konotop, Ukrainian Soviet Socialist Republic. He is a graduate of the Odesa Institute of the Ground Forces and the National Defense Academy of Ukraine.

== Military career ==
He served in the 80th Separate Airmobile Brigade from 1998 and participated in the War in Donbas since 2014.

In 2022 he became the commander of the 80th Air Assault Brigade and led it during the Kharkiv counteroffensive later that year, for which he was awarded the title Hero of Ukraine.

In 2023 he became the chief of staff and deputy commander of the Air Assault Forces, and on 11 February 2024 he became the commander.

On 5 December 2024, Skybiuk was promoted to major general.

On 3 June 2025, he was dismissed as commander of the Air Assault Forces.

On 22 July 2026, he became Chief of the General Staff of the Armed Forces of Ukraine

== Awards ==
- Hero of Ukraine (14 October 2022)
- Order of Bohdan Khmelnytsky, 2nd class (27 May 2022)
- Order of Bohdan Khmelnytsky, 3rd class (8 March 2022)

Military offices
Preceded by Volodymyr Shvorak	Commander of the 80th Air Assault Brigade; 2022–2023	Succeeded by Emil Ishkulov
Preceded by Artem Kotenko	Chief of Staff and First Deputy Commander of the Ukrainian Air Assault Forces; 2023–2024	Succeeded by Dmytro Bratishko
Preceded by Maksym Myrhorodskyi	Commander of the Ukrainian Air Assault Forces; 2024–2025	Succeeded by Oleh Apostol
Preceded by Andrii Hnatov	Chief of the General Staff of the Armed Forces of Ukraine; 2026–present	Succeeded by Incumbent
