= Order of Bogdan Khmelnitsky =

Order of Bogdan Khmelnitsky may refer to the following state military awards:

- Order of Bogdan Khmelnitsky (Soviet Union)
- Order of Bohdan Khmelnytsky, in Ukraine
