= Bohdan Senyk =

Ukrainian military journalist and communicator

- Богдан Сеник

Personal details
- Born: Bohdan Mykolaiovych Senyk Ivano-Frankivsk Oblast
- Education: College of Law, Lviv Military Institute, National Academy for Public Administration, National Defense University of Ukraine

Military service
- Allegiance: Ukraine
- Years of service: 1997 – present
- Rank: Colonel

Bohdan Mykolaiovych Senyk (Ukrainian: Богдан Миколайович Сеник, born in Ivano-Frankivsk Oblast) is a Ukrainian military journalist, communicator, colonel and head of the Public Relations Department of the Armed Forces of Ukraine.

== Biography ==
Senyk is originally from Ivano-Frankivsk Oblast.

=== Education ===
Graduated from the College of Law (with honors), Lviv Military Institute of the Lviv Polytechnic National University (2002, with honors, specialty "military journalism"), National Academy for Public Administration (2012, master's degree), National Defense University of Ukraine (2016). During his studies, he was the head of the course at the Humanitarian Institute of the National Defense University.

=== Military service ===
Since 1997, he has been in the Armed Forces of Ukraine. He served as a special correspondent of the TV newsroom; department editor, acting editor-in-chief and editor-in-chief of TV programs of the Central TV and Radio Studio of the Ministry of Defense of Ukraine; twice served as the acting assistant commander of the Ukrainian national contingent for media relations during the peacekeeping mission in Kosovo.

Senyk later worked as deputy editor of the Euro-Atlantic Integration and Economics and Advertising departments of the Ministry of Defense newspaper Narodna Armiia.

In March 2014, he became the head of the Press and Information Department of the Ministry of Defense of Ukraine.

Since 2016, he has been the head and organizer of the Public Relations Department of the Armed Forces of Ukraine.

During 2017–2018, he served as the Deputy Commander of the ATO for Media and Public Relations.

== Military ranks ==
- Colonel
- Lieutenant colonel
