= Bilozirka =

Bilozirka (Ukrainian: Білозірка) may refer to several places in Ukraine:

- Bilozirka, Mykolaiv Oblast, a village in Vitovka Raion
- Bilozirka, Ternopil Oblast, a village in Kremenets Raion
- Bilozirka, Vinnytsia Oblast, a village in Lityn Raion

== See also ==
- Bilozerka, an urban-type settlement in Kherson Oblast, Ukraine
- Bilozerka (river), Ukraine
- Bilozerka Raion
