= Yurii Ihnat =

Officer and spokesman of the Ukrainian Air Force

- Юрій Ігнат
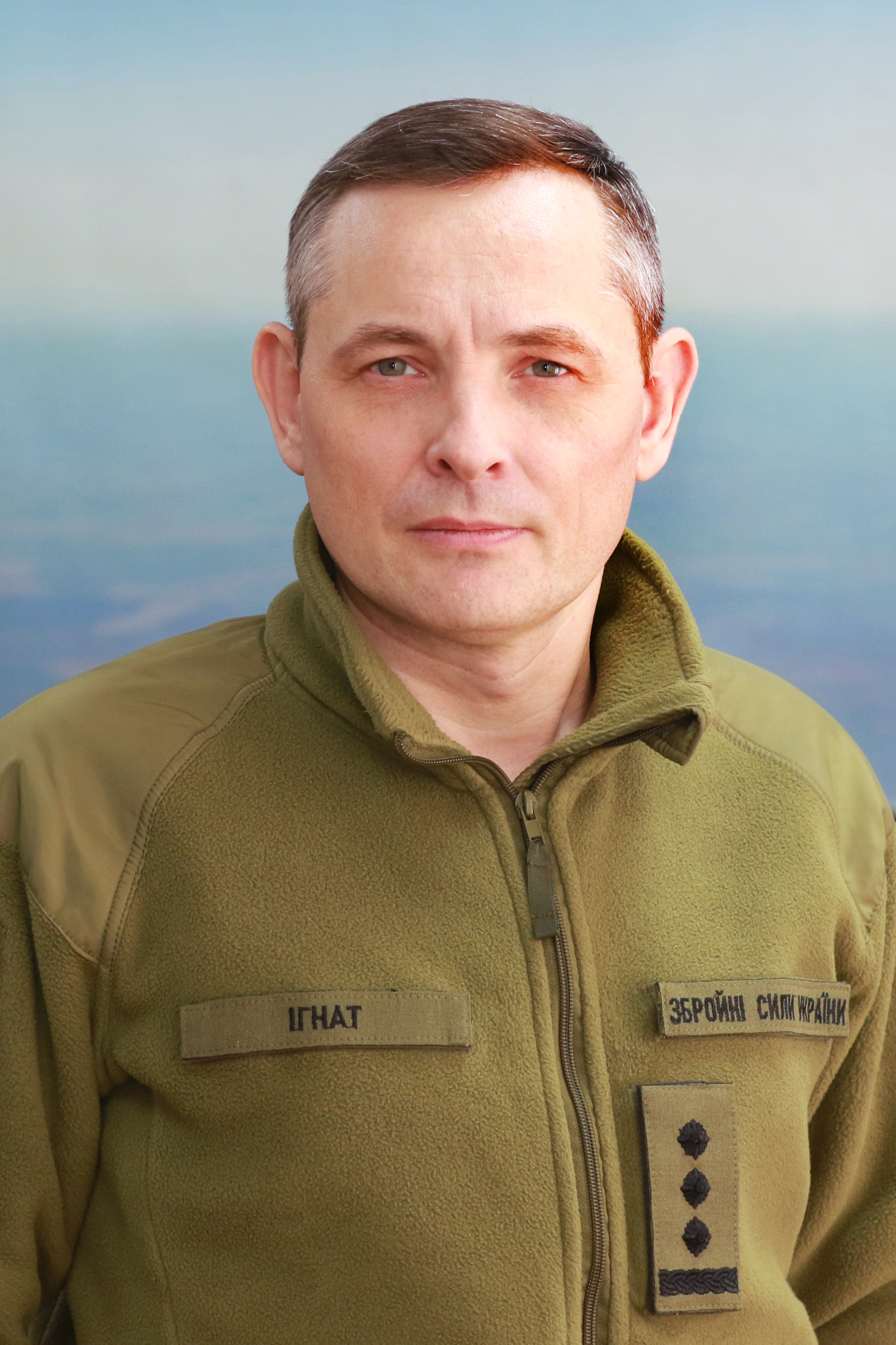
- Ihnat in 2023

Personal details
- Born: December 23, 1977 (age 48)
- Education: Lviv Military Institute

Military service
- Allegiance: Ukraine
- Branch/service: Air Force Armed Forces of Ukraine
- Rank: Colonel
- Battles/wars: Russo-Ukrainian War
- Awards: Order of Danylo Halytsky

Yurii Robertovych Ihnat (Ukrainian: Юрій Робертович Ігнат; born 23 December 1977) is a Ukrainian serviceman, colonel of the Armed Forces of Ukraine, a participant in the Russo-Ukrainian war.

== Biography ==
He grew up in the family of Robert Ihnat, a journalist for the publications Moloda Halychyna and Za Vilnu Ukrainu; his grandfather, also Yurii Ihnat, fought in the ranks of the national liberation movement and is buried at Lychakiv Cemetery.

After five years of studying, he graduated from the Lviv Military Institute at Lviv Polytechnic National University (specialty: military journalism).

In 1999, he started working for a new military publication, the Kryla Ukrainy newspaper. He spent six months on a business trip to Africa.

As of 2017, he is the Head of the Air Force Editorial Department of the Central Printed Organ of the Ministry of Defense of Ukraine "Narodna Armiia".

In 2018, he headed the press service of the Air Force Command of the Armed Forces of Ukraine. As of May 2022, he is a lieutenant colonel.

Currently, he is a colonel, head of the public relations service of the Air Force Command of the Armed Forces of Ukraine.

On 18 March 2024, Ihnat was dismissed from his position as a spokesman for the Ukrainian Air Force. In December 2024, he was appointed Head of the Communications Department of the Air Force Command of the Armed Forces of Ukraine.

== Awards ==
- Order of Danylo Halytsky (27 May 2022)
- Certificate of Honor from Vinnytsia Regional State Administration and Regional Council (2017)
