= Heorhii Chyzhevskyi =

Ukrainian swimmer and Soviet soldier during World War II (1924–2025)

- Георгій Чижевський
- Born: 29 March 1924; Voznesensk, Odesa Governorate, Ukrainian SSR, USSR
- Died: 21 October 2025 (aged 101); Voznesensk, Mykolaiv Oblast, Ukraine
- Military career
- Allegiance: Soviet Union
- Branch: Red Army
- Rank: Lieutenant
- Unit: 31st Tank Brigade
- Wars: World War II; German-Soviet War; Battle of Kursk; Vistula–Oder Offensive; Battle of Berlin; Occupation of Germany
- Awards: Order of the Red Star (twice); Medal "For the Liberation of Warsaw"; Medal "For the Capture of Berlin"; Medal "For the Victory over Germany in the Great Patriotic War 1941–1945"

Heorhii Chyzhevskyi
Personal information
- Nationality: Ukraine

Sport
- Sport: Swimming
- Strokes: Butterfly, Freestyle, Breaststroke
- Club: Gavrylych Swim Club
Medal record
Men's swimming (masters)
Representing Ukraine
World Championships (LC)
Gold medal – first place	2015 Kazan	200 m breaststroke
Gold medal – first place	2017 Budapest	200 m breaststroke
Gold medal – first place	2017 Budapest	4x50 m medley
Gold medal – first place	2017 Budapest	4x50 m freestyle
Silver medal – second place	2015 Kazan	50 m freestyle
Silver medal – second place	2015 Kazan	50 m breaststroke
Silver medal – second place	2015 Kazan	50 m butterfly
Silver medal – second place	2015 Kazan	100 m breaststroke

Heorhii Dmytrovych Chyzhevskyi (Ukrainian: Георгій Дмитрович Чижевський; 29 March 1924 – 21 October 2025) was a Ukrainian masters swimmer and a veteran of the Second World War.

== Biography ==
Heorhii Chyzhevskyi was born on 29 March 1924 in Voznesensk, and grew up in Odesa. When the German-Soviet War began in June 1941, his parents were evacuated to Volga region.

In August 1942, he studied at Kyiv Military School named after Frunze, later - in Leningrad artillery military school.

On 3 June 1943, he began to serve in Red Army as a Lieutenant of 31st Tank Brigade, taking part in Battle of Kursk, Vistula–Oder Offensive and Battle of Berlin till 1945. He was awarded the Order of the Red Star (twice), Medal "For the Liberation of Warsaw", Medal "For the Capture of Berlin", Medal "For the Victory over Germany in the Great Patriotic War 1941–1945" and other war medals.

After the Second World War, Heorhii graduated from the theatre school and worked as an actor in Zhytomyr, Ismail and Vladivostok.

Then he studied at the pedagogical university in Khabarovsk and worked as a teacher of anatomy, physiology and sport.

From 1970, he resided in Voznesensk, where he also mastered the profession of a locksmith (grade 5). After moving to the city of Voznesensk, he worked at the Yelanetsk Group Waterworks for more than 10 years.

Chyzhevskyi died on 21 October 2025, at the age of 101.

== Swimming career ==
Heorhii began to swim at the age of 10.

In 2015, he competed at the swimming competitions in masters category. Heorhii became a multiple gold medalist in three swimming categories in the Mykolaiv Oblast's aquatics championships.

At the 2015 FINA World Aquatics Masters Championships, held in Kazan, he won a gold medal in 200 m breaststroke event and received four silver medals in different events. Heorhii broke a European record in the 200 m breaststroke event. In that year, he became the best sportsman of Mykolaiv Oblast in category "Veteran of sport".

At the 2017 FINA World Aquatics Masters Championships in Budapest, he became a three times world champion in 4x50 metres medley and freestyle relays and 200 m breaststroke events.

Heorhii broke the European records in 4x50 m freestyle and medley relays in Budapest.

At the age of 100, he broke three world records in 50, 100 and 200 metres breaststroke events at the Ukrainian National Championships in Brovary.
