= Dmytro Tymchuk =

Ukrainian milblogger, lieutenant colonel and politician

- Дмитро Тимчук
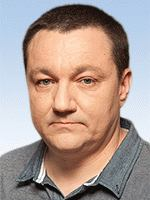
- Official Verkhovna Rada portrait, 2014

People's Deputy of Ukraine
- In office 27 November 2014 – 19 June 2019
- Constituency: People's Front, No. 13

Personal details
- Born: 27 June 1972 Chita, Zabaykalsky Krai, Russian SFSR, Soviet Union (now Russia)
- Died: 19 June 2019 (aged 46) Kyiv, Ukraine
- Party: People's Front
- Education: Lviv Higher Military-Political School
- Occupation: Military expert; journalist; politician
- Website: sprotyv.info/en

Military service
- Allegiance: Ukraine
- Branch/service: Ukrainian Ground Forces; National Guard of Ukraine
- Years of service: 1995–2012
- Rank: Lieutenant colonel
- Unit: Multi-National Force – Iraq; Kosovo Force; Multinational Force in Lebanon

Dmytro Borysovych Tymchuk (Ukrainian: Дмитро Борисович Тимчук; 27 June 1972 – 19 June 2019) was a Ukrainian milblogger, lieutenant colonel, and politician who served as a People's Deputy of Ukraine from the proportional list of the People's Front from 2014 until his death in 2019. He was one of the coordinators of the Information Resistance blog. During the ongoing 2014 pro-Russian unrest in Ukraine, he became one of the most popular Ukrainian online activists and was extensively cited on the situation in the country.

== Early life and education ==
Tymchuk was born 27 June 1972 in Chita, Zabaykalsky Krai, in the Russian Far East. From 1978 to 1983, he lived in the German Democratic Republic due to his father's service in the Soviet Army and then moved to Berdychiv in the Ukrainian SSR, where he spent the rest of his youth. In 1995, Tymchuk graduated from the Faculty of Journalism of the Lviv Higher Military-Political School (Soviet predecessor of the Hetman Petro Sahaidachnyi National Ground Forces Academy).

== Career ==
Tymchuk served in the Ukrainian Ground Forces from 1995 to 1997 and then worked at the headquarters of the National Guard of Ukraine until 2000. From 2000 to 2012, he worked in various divisions of the Ministry of Defense of Ukraine. He served in Iraq, Kosovo, and Lebanon. His highest military rank is lieutenant colonel.

In 2008, Tymchuk became the chief editor of the online publication Fleet-2017 and head of the Center for Military-Political Studies, a non-governmental organisation. He is one of the coordinators of the Information Resistance news website. During the 2014 pro-Russian unrest in Ukraine and War in Donbas, Tymchuk became one of the most popular Ukrainian online activists in Ukraine and was extensively cited on the situation in the country. In November 2014, the number of those following his Facebook page exceeded 190,000 IP addresses.

Tymchuk became a founding member of the new People's Front party on 10 September 2014, 46 days before the 2014 Ukrainian parliamentary election. He was elected to the Verkhovna Rada (Ukrainian parliament).

== Death ==
On 19 June 2019, Tymchuk was found dead in his home from a firearm injury to his head. According to media reports and the preliminary working version of the Kyiv police he was cleaning his gun and accidentally discharged it.

== See also ==
- List of members of the Verkhovna Rada of Ukraine who died in office
