= Hetman Petro Sahaidachnyi National Ground Forces Academy =

Military educational institution in Lviv, Ukraine

Hetman Petro Sahaidachny National Army Academy
- Національна академія сухопутних військ імені гетьмана Петра Сагайдачного
- Academy coat of arms
- Type: Military academy
- Established: 1899
- Founder: Francis Joseph I
- Officer in charge: Lieutenant General Pavlo Tkachuk
- Location: Lviv, Lviv Oblast, 79012, Ukraine; 49.82430°N 24.01736°E
- Campus: Urban
- Language: Ukrainian
- Website: www.asv.gov.ua

The Hetman Petro Sahaidachny National Army Academy (Ukrainian: Національна академія сухопутних військ імені гетьмана Петра Сагайдачного, romanized: Natsionalna akademiia sukhoputnykh viisk imeni hetmana Petra Sahaidachnoho) is one of the leading educational institutions in the military education system of the Ministry of Defense of Ukraine. The Academy trains future officers of the Ukrainian Armed Forces in facilities that have been used since 1899 by different governments for training infantry cadets and officers.

== History ==
=== Austria-Hungary ===
On October 1, 1899, on the territory of the present Academy, the opening of the Imperial and Royal School of Cadets in Lviv (K. und k. Infanterie Kadettenschule in Lemberg) was held. This facility was the only one in Galicia and the sixteenth military academy in Austria-Hungary. Graduates of the institution received the title "Kadet-Deputy Officer". In 1914, the school was evacuated to Austria. Among the outstanding graduates were Colonel Hnat Stefaniv, Lieutenant Colonel Alfred Bizantz, and Ataman Boguslav Shashkevich, who played an important role during the Ukrainian War of Independence.

=== Second Polish Republic ===
After the Aster Revolution led to the collapse of Austria-Hungary, the complex of buildings was abandoned. In 1921, the Polish Cadet Corps No. 1 (in 1935 renamed as the Józef Piłsudski Cadet Corps) was relocated there from Kraków. The German invasion forced the Polish command in September 1939 to evacuate the Cadet Corps No. 3 from Rawicz to Lviv. However, in connection with the offensive of the Red Army, it was not possible to start classes. After the accession of Western Ukrainian lands to the Ukrainian SSR, the Soviet authorities disbanded the educational institution.

=== Soviet Union ===
From the end of September to November 14, 1939, the headquarters of the Ukrainian Front were stationed in the premises of the former Cadet Corps. After its disbandment, the Lviv Infantry School of the Red Army was relocated to Ostroh a year later. From December 1940 to March 1941, training buildings were on the street. Kadetsky, 32, became the place of the disposition of the 15th motorized artillery brigade. In March 1941, it replaced the 32nd Tank Division of the 4th Mechanized Corps of the Red Army. During the German occupation of the current Academy, there was a military hospital, and from the end of July 1944 until the spring of 1947, a Soviet military hospital.

In 1947, a school, which in various locations had trained about 11,000 police officers, moved to Lviv and became the Lviv Military-Political School (for some time, it was named after Nikolay Shchors), occupying the territory of the cadet corps barracks. The facility trained officers for service in the editorial boards of the military media and cultural and educational institutions of the Soviet Armed Forces. In 1962, the Lviv military-political school was transformed into a higher one. On April 30, 1975, by the decree of the Presidium of the Supreme Soviet of the USSR, the Lviv higher military-political school was awarded the Order of the Red Star. In 1978, for services in increasing the combat readiness of the armed forces of the Czechoslovak Socialist Republic, the LVVPU was awarded the Order of the Red Star of the Czechoslovak Socialist Republic. During the years of Soviet rule, the school gained experience in training officer personnel for the armed forces of foreign powers. After gaining the status of a higher education institution at a special faculty in August 1971, servicemen from more than 20 countries of Eastern Europe, Asia, Africa, and Latin America studied there and gained experience in political education and military culture.

=== Ukraine ===
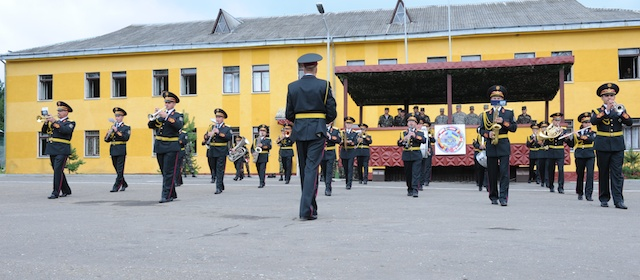
The Military Band of the National Ground Forces Academy.

With Ukraine regaining its independence, the creation of its own Armed Forces begins a new page in the history of the Lviv Military Institute. On October 8, 1993, based on Lviv Higher Military School and military departments of civil higher educational institutions of Lviv, a new type of military educational establishment was created which was the first in Ukraine to be closely integrated with the system of civilian higher education, in particular with the National University "Lviv Polytechnic". This integration implemented the fundamental principle of the Concept of Military Education in Ukraine, established by the Decree of the Cabinet of Ministers of Ukraine of December 15, 1997, which states that "military education is integrated into the state system of education based on a unified Legislative and regulatory framework ".

In close integration with the civil university, the Lviv Military Institute began to train officers from fifteen specialties in 1993, including "Combat application of mechanized units", "Combat application of aeromobile (parachute-landing) units" (cadets of these specialties were transferred to the Odesa Military Academy in 1995), as well as on specialties "Financial support and economy of combat and economic activity of troops", "Jurisprudence", etc.

On November 18, 2000, for the great successes in training qualified specialists for the Ukrainian army and on the occasion of the 100th anniversary of the training of officers in Galicia, the President Leonid Kuchma granted the academy the honorific title "Hetman Petro Sagaidachny" and awarded it the Diploma of Honor. By decree of the Cabinet of Ministers of Ukraine dated May 26, 2005, No. 381, the educational institution was reorganized into the Lviv Institute of Land Forces, and since September 1, 2006, it has trained military specialists in all specialties of the Land Forces of the Armed Forces of Ukraine. On September 30, 2006, the Institute was visited by President Viktor Yushchenko, who highly assessed the organization of training officers for the Armed Forces of Ukraine.

On September 1, 2009, it was transformed into the Ground Forces Academy "Hetman Petro Sahaidachnyi", mandated to form both officers and non-commissioned personnel of the Ground Forces. On September 21, 2015, President Petro Poroshenko ordered that the academy be granted the status of a National Academy and removed its Order of the Red Star. Two alumni of the academy were killed in the Anti-Terrorist Operation. As of December 2024, 56 graduates of the academy have been awarded the title Hero of Ukraine.

== Academics ==
The Academy provides training for officers in the command and control of mechanized forces, airborne troops, special forces, and military intelligence, ground artillery, missile forces, artillery reconnaissance, missile and artillery weapons, automobiles and automobile industry, physical education, cultural studies, journalism (last edition of 2010), and musical art.

The academy has four faculties:

- Faculty of Combat Use of Troops
- Faculty of Air Assault Forces
- Faculty of Missile Forces and Artillery
- Faculty of training specialists for the provision of troops

The academy also includes the Staff Sergeants Military College, which trains junior specialists in the repair and maintenance of automotive equipment, warehouse managers in various fields, as well as musicians in military bands. Cadets undergo military practice at the International Center for Peacekeeping and Security. In 2009 alone, the academy graduated 238 lieutenants.

=== Chervonohrad Military High School HPSNGFA ===
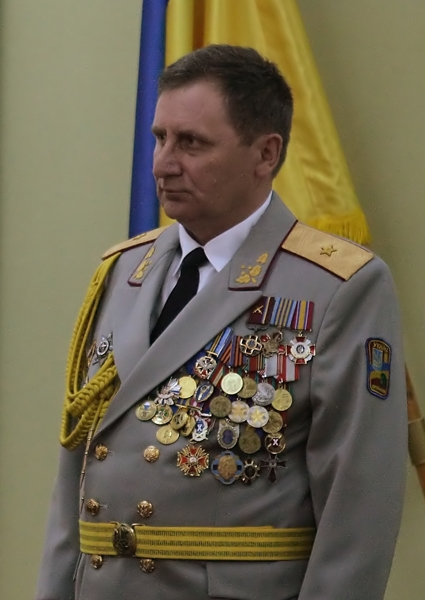
Lt. Gen Pavlo Tkachuk in 2007

The Chervonohrad Military High School (Ukrainian: Червоноградський військовий ліцей) is a part of the academy. Its students study from grades 10-11. It has a total number of around 400 people, including staff and employees, with an annual enrollment of 200 lyceum cadets every academic year.

The creation of a military lyceum in Chervonohrad was planned in 2017 on the basis of a former boarding school. It was created by order of Minister of Defense Stepan Poltorak on 3 August 2018. The school year began on 1 September 2019.

== Student life ==
The academy maintains its own Cadet Military Band which promotes the patriotic, cultural and musical education of Ground Forces. Created in 1942 during the Siege of Stalingrad, it is part of the Military Music Department of the General Staff of the Ukrainian Armed Forces. LVVPU was a football team based in Lviv that served as part of the Lviv Military-Political School. On campus, there is a restored church of the Archangel Michael that was constructed during the Austrian period. Cadets from the academy took part in the 2010 Moscow Victory Day Parade on Red Square, celebrating the 65th anniversary of the end of the Great Patriotic War. In recent years, it has received visits from distinguished visitors. Among them, was Tsakhiagiin Elbegdorj, an alumni who visited in 2011 as part of a state visit to Ukraine in his position as President of Mongolia.

=== Museum of History ===
The Museum of History of the National Academy is a military-historical museum located in the academy. The museum presents the history of the educational institution, as well as the history of educational institutions that previously existed on the territory of the town. The renovated museum was opened on 28 October 2010. The museum consists of 9 halls. The museum is headed by Mykhailo Slobodyanyuk.

== Notable graduates ==
- Tsakhiagiin Elbegdorj, former President of Mongolia
- Andrii Verkhohliad, Ukrainian soldier
- Dmytro Tymchuk, one of the coordinators of the Information Resistance blog
- Emil Ishkulov, Ukrainian Air Force colonel
- Iryna Vereshchuk, former Deputy of the Verkhovna Rada (Ukraine's national parliament) and Minister of Reintegration of Temporarily Occupied Territories
- Ihor Hordiichuk, Hero of Ukraine recipient
- Oleh Apostol, Ukrainian brigade general
- Pavlo Palisa, Ukrainian Army colonel
- Vadym Sukharevsky, Ukrainian Army colonel
- Yurii Ihnat, Ukrainian Air Force colonel
- Valeriy Chybineyev, Ukrainian soldier, Hero of Ukraine
- Roman Darmohrai, Ukrainian soldier, Hero of Ukraine

== See also ==
- Combined Arms Academy of the Armed Forces of the Russian Federation
- Military Academy of Belarus
- Military Institute of the Kazakh Ground Forces
- FC Sokil Lviv
