= Goncharovka =

Goncharovka Гончаровка
- Village
- Location within Bashkortostan Location within Russia
- Coordinates: 53°10′N 55°06′E
- Country: Russia
- Region: Bashkortostan
- District: Fyodorovsky District
- Time zone: UTC+5:00

Goncharovka (Russian: Гончаровка) is a rural locality (a village) and the administrative centre of Goncharovsky Selsoviet, Fyodorovsky District, Bashkortostan, Russia. The population was 1,020 as of 2010. There are 11 streets.

== Geography ==
Goncharovka is located 7 km southwest of Fyodorovka (the district's administrative centre) by road. Fyodorovka is the nearest rural locality.
