= Battle of Voznesensk =

Battle of the Russian invasion of Ukraine

- Part of the southern front of the Russian invasion of Ukraine
- Russian occupation of Mykolaiv Oblast during the 2022 Kherson counteroffensive
Date	2–3 March 2022 (1 day)
Location	Voznesensk, Mykolaiv Oblast, Ukraine 47°34′21″N 31°18′43″E
Result	Ukrainian victory

Belligerents
Russia	Ukraine

Units involved
126th Coastal Defence Brigade; 11th Guards Air Assault Brigade; 11th Guards Engineering Brigade	80th Air Assault Brigade; 28th Mechanized Brigade; 123rd Territorial Defense Brigade

Strength
Per Ukraine: 400 soldiers 43 vehicles	

Casualties and losses
Per Ukraine: 100 soldiers killed 10 soldiers captured 30 vehicles captured or destroyed 1 Mil Mi-24 destroyed	43 soldiers killed and wounded
- Per Ukraine: 10 civilians killed

In early March 2022, a military engagement took place in the small city of Voznesensk, Ukraine, as part of the southern front of the Russian invasion of Ukraine.

After surrounding the city of Kherson, Russian forces advanced west towards the city of Mykolaiv. While Russian forces attacked Mykolaiv, a Russian column detached and pushed north, engaging Ukrainian forces at Voznesensk. The city was considered strategically significant to Russian forces due to having a bridge across the Southern Bug river and its proximity to the South Ukraine Nuclear Power Plant.

== Battle ==
On 1 March 2022, the Voznesensk territorial defence battalion, made up of civilian volunteers, took up a defensive position at a checkpoint on the P55 highway outside the village of Malosolone. A column of Russian military vehicles left Yelanets for Voznesensk around 5:00 the next morning. At 10:00, the column approached the Ukrainian position, and the leading BMP was disabled during a battle, which slowed down the Russian advance. The Ukrainians withdrew to the city of Voznesensk having lost one fighter. The Russian column passed through the village of Voznesenske around 12:49, and entered Voznesensk around 13:53.

On 2 March, elements of the 126th Coastal Defence Brigade of the Russian Black Sea Fleet advanced northwest towards the city of Voznesensk from Mykolaiv, attempting to find a crossing over the Southern Bug river. The Russian column was alleged to have consisted of 400 men and 43 vehicles.

In preparation, Yevgeniy Velychko, the mayor of the city and one of the Ukrainian commanders, stated that local businessmen helped Ukrainian forces create numerous roadblocks and destroyed a bridge over the Mertvovod River in Voznesensk, as well as digging out the shoreline of the river so that Russian vehicles could not ford it.

Russian forces initiated the battle by shelling the city, damaging several buildings. Russian airborne troops were dropped to the southwest of the city, while an armoured column advanced from the southeast, staging in the neighbouring village of Rakove. A unit of Russian airborne troops also landed in the village of Andriichykove. Russian snipers created nests in several houses in the village, and Russian forces set up a base at a local petrol station. A Russian APC fired at the local Territorial Defense Forces base, killing several Ukrainian soldiers. Russian forces were unable to push into Voznesensk. Ukrainian artillery began shelling Russian positions, preventing Russian artillery from setting up their mortars.

By nightfall, Russian tanks began firing into Voznesensk, but retreated after being met with counterfire. Concurrently, Ukrainian forces continued to shell Russian positions, destroying some Russian vehicles. Ukrainian soldiers advanced on foot, attacking Russian vehicles with American-supplied FGM-148 Javelin missiles, destroying at least three tanks. Ukrainian forces were also able to down a Russian Mil Mi-24 attack helicopter. Russian forces fully retreated on 3 March, abandoning equipment and vehicles. During their retreat, Russian artillery shelled Rakove, hitting a clinic. Russian forces also looted the village. The Russian column retreated 40 miles (64 km) to the southeast. The 80th Air Assault Brigade retook Andriichykove, claiming to have killed 30 Russian airborne troops while losing 10 of their own soldiers.

An entire Russian battalion tactical group (BTG) was destroyed in the battle. In total, 30 of the 43 Russian vehicles, including some tanks, were captured or destroyed. Among them, Ukrainian forces were able to salvage 15 tanks. Local officials stated that around 100 Russian soldiers were killed and 10 were captured. Ukrainian forces casualties were 43 soldiers, including Territorial Defense Forces. 12 civilians were killed during the battle.

== Aftermath ==
On 5 March, Russian airborne troops reportedly landed in the village of Yastrubynove, south of Voznesensk, and two days later, a Russian helicopter was shot down in Rakove.

The local Ukrainian forces continued to fortify the city after the assault, believing that Russian forces would continue their attacks.

The defence of Voznesensk has been credited in Ukrainian media with preventing Russian forces from surrounding Mykolaiv and moving toward Odesa.
