= Trudoliubivka, Beryslav Raion, Kherson Oblast =

Village in Kherson Oblast, Ukraine

Trudoliubivka Трудолюбівка
- Village
- Interactive map of Trudoliubivka
- Location of Trudoliubivka within Ukraine Trudoliubivka (Ukraine)
- Coordinates: 47.447778°N 33.696667°E
- Country: Ukraine
- Oblast: Kherson Oblast
- Raion: Beryslav Raion
- Hromada: Novovorontsovka settlement hromada
- Founded: 1928

Area
  - Total: 81.6 km^{2} (31.5 sq mi)
- Elevation: 83 m (272 ft)

Population (2001 census)
  - Total: 282
  - Density: 3.46/km^{2} (8.95/sq mi)
- Time zone: UTC+2 (EET)
  - Summer (DST): UTC+3 (EEST)
- Postal code: 74212
- Area code: +380 5533

Trudoliubivka (Ukrainian: Трудолюбівка; Russian: Трудолюбовка) is a village in Beryslav Raion, Kherson Oblast, southern Ukraine, about 125.6 kilometres (78.0 mi) northeast from the centre of Kherson city. It has an area of 81.6 km2, which makes the city relatively big.

== History ==
The village was established in 1928. During the Great Patriotic War, the village was occupied by German troops from 20 August 1941 to 27 February 1944, before Soviet troops recaptured the village.

The village came under attack by Russian forces in 2022, during the Russian invasion of Ukraine. It was recaptured by Ukrainian forces from the Russians on 6 April 2022, which allowed for Ukrainian advancement into the settlement of Osokorivka and gain a foothold on the borders of the Kherson region. According to Suspilne in interviews with residents, during the occupation by the Russians only four residents remained in the village, while the rest of the village fled. After it was retaken by the Ukrainians, half a hundred people returned to the village, which was half of the village's residents prior to the occupation. However, mining and the damage of properties by shelling have disrupted farming in the village, and many shops have not opened up again, but it has started to rebuild with the help of neighboring villages.

== Demographics ==
The settlement had 282 inhabitants in 2001. The native language distribution as of the Ukrainian Census of 2001 was:

- Ukrainian: 97.45%
- Russian: 2.19%
- Belarusian: 0.36%
