= Vynohradivka, Bashtanka Raion, Mykolaiv Oblast =

Village in Mykolaiv Oblast, Ukraine

Vynohradivka Виноградівка
- Village
- Interactive map of Vynohradivka
- Location of Vynohradivka within Ukraine Vynohradivka (Ukraine)
- Coordinates: 47.191389°N 32.2625°E
- Country: Ukraine
- Oblast: Mykolaiv Oblast
- Raion: Bashtanka Raion
- Founded: 1805

Area
  - Total: 0.7 km^{2} (0.27 sq mi)
- Elevation: 4 m (13 ft)

Population (2001 census)
  - Total: 1,388
  - Density: 2,000/km^{2} (5,100/sq mi)
- Time zone: UTC+2 (EET)
  - Summer (DST): UTC+3 (EEST)
- Postal code: 56175
- Area code: +380 5158

Vynohradivka (Ukrainian: Виноградівка; Russian: Виноградовка; until 1946 Novyi Danzig (Новый Данциг)) is a village in Bashtanka Raion (district) in Mykolaiv Oblast of southern Ukraine, at about 36.6 kilometres (22.7 mi) northeast by north from the centre of Mykolaiv city. It belongs to Inhulka rural hromada, one of the hromadas of Ukraine.

The village came under attack by Russian forces in 2022, during the Russian invasion of Ukraine.

== Demographics ==
The settlement had 1341 inhabitants in 2001, native language distribution as of the Ukrainian Census of 2001:

- Ukrainian: 77.67%
- Russian: 6.99%
- Moldovan (Romanian): 1.08%
- Armenian: 0.79%
- German: 0.07%
- other languages: 13.40%
