= Emil Ishkulov =

Ukrainian Air Force commander

Emil Shamilovych Ishkulov (Ukrainian: Еміль Шамільович Ішкулов; born 6 June 1987 in Vahdat) is a commander in the Ukrainian Armed Forces who served during the Russian invasion of Ukraine. Since August 2026, he has been commander of the 11th Army Corps. He commanded the 80th Air Assault Brigade from late 2022 to July 2024. He was dismissed due to his opposition to the August 2024 Ukrainian invasion of Kursk Oblast in Russia.

== Career ==
In late 2022, Ishkulov was made commander of the 80th Air Assault Brigade. Before 29 July 2024, it became known to the brigade's other leaders that he would be dismissed as commander for "[opposing] a task that didn't correspond to the brigade's strength", ordered by Commander-in-Chief of the Armed Forces of Ukraine, Oleksandr Syrskyi. Early on the 29th, those leaders released a video where they called for him not to be dismissed, saying: "We don't understand why commanders who have unquestioned authority among the personnel, who have a victorious combat record and experience of a big war, are out of favor with the top leadership of the armed forces." Later that day, the Air Assault Forces confirmed he was being dismissed, but said he would eventually be promoted. In August 2024, Ukraine invaded Kursk Oblast. After initial successes, the invasion faced serious problems. In September, Politico reported that anonymous high-ranking Ukrainian military sources had told them Ishkulov was dismissed for opposing the invasion. He felt his brigade would be too exposed inside Russia and face heavy casualties. As of 17 September, he has not received a new position.

August 2026, Ishkulov appointed commander of the 11th Army Corps.
