= Bilozirka, Mykolaiv Oblast =

Rural locality in Mykolaiv Oblast, Ukraine

Bilozirka Білозірка
- Village
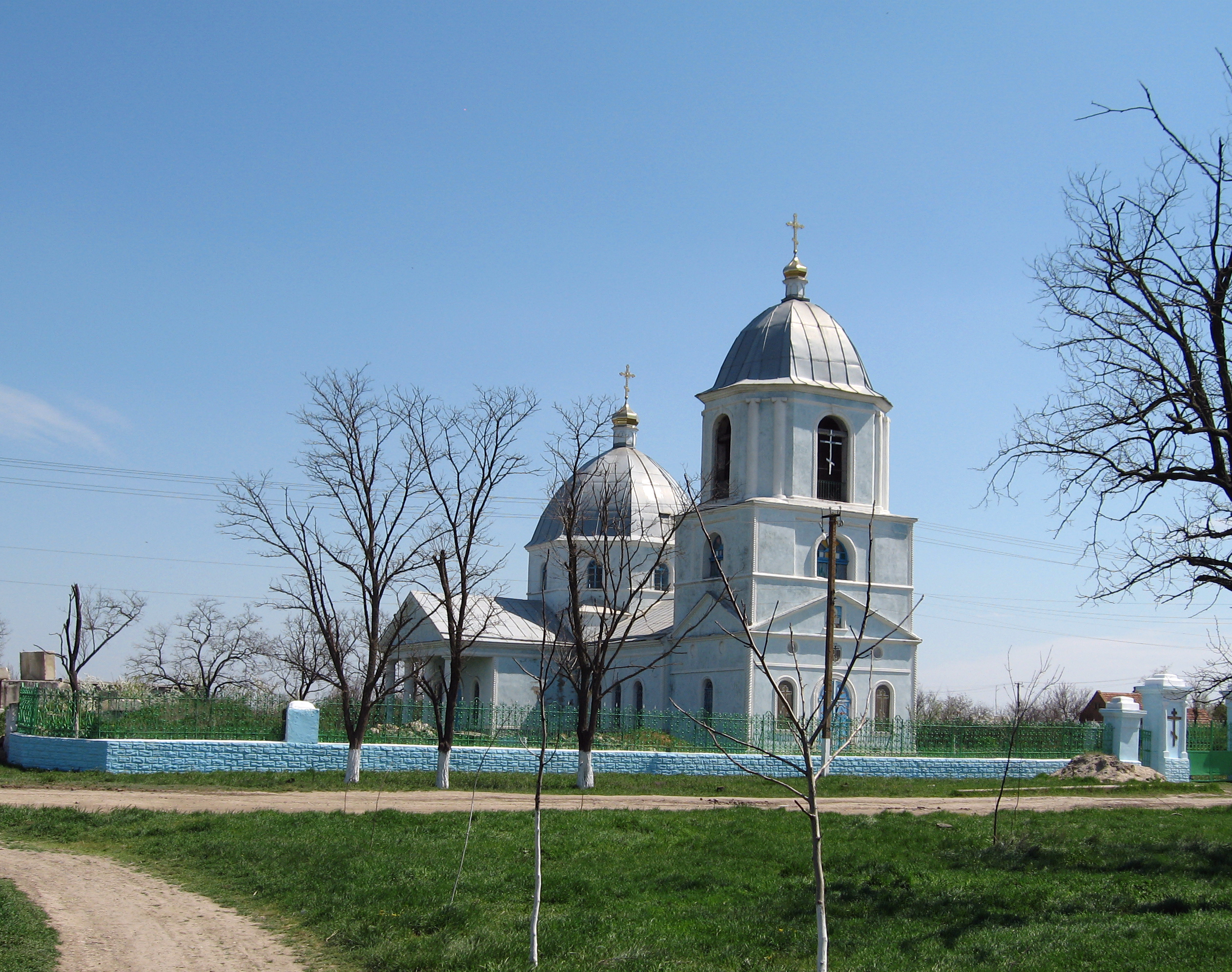

- Location of Bilozirka within Mykolaiv Oblast#Location of Bilozirka within Ukraine Bilozirka (Ukraine)
- Coordinates: 47°05′07″N 32°27′16″E
- Country: Ukraine
- Oblast: Mykolaiv Oblast
- District: Mykolaiv Raion
- Elevation: 57 m (187 ft)

Population (2001)
  - Total: 1,757
- Time zone: UTC+2 (EET)
  - Summer (DST): UTC+3 (EEST)
- Postal code: 57231
- Area code: +380 512

Bilozirka (Ukrainian: Білозірка) is a village in Mykolaiv Raion (district) in Mykolaiv Oblast of southern Ukraine.

== History ==
Bilozirka was founded in 1812. In 1922, it was renamed Barmashove (Бармашове) after a local Soviet activist. In March 2016, it received its current name in the course of decommunization in Ukraine.

Until 18 July 2020, Bilozirka was located in Vitovka Raion. The raion was abolished in July 2020 as part of the administrative reform of Ukraine, which reduced the number of raions of Mykolaiv Oblast to four. The area of Berezanka Raion was merged into Mykolaiv Raion.
