= Voznesensk =

City in Mykolaiv Oblast, Ukraine

Voznesensk Вознесенськ
- City
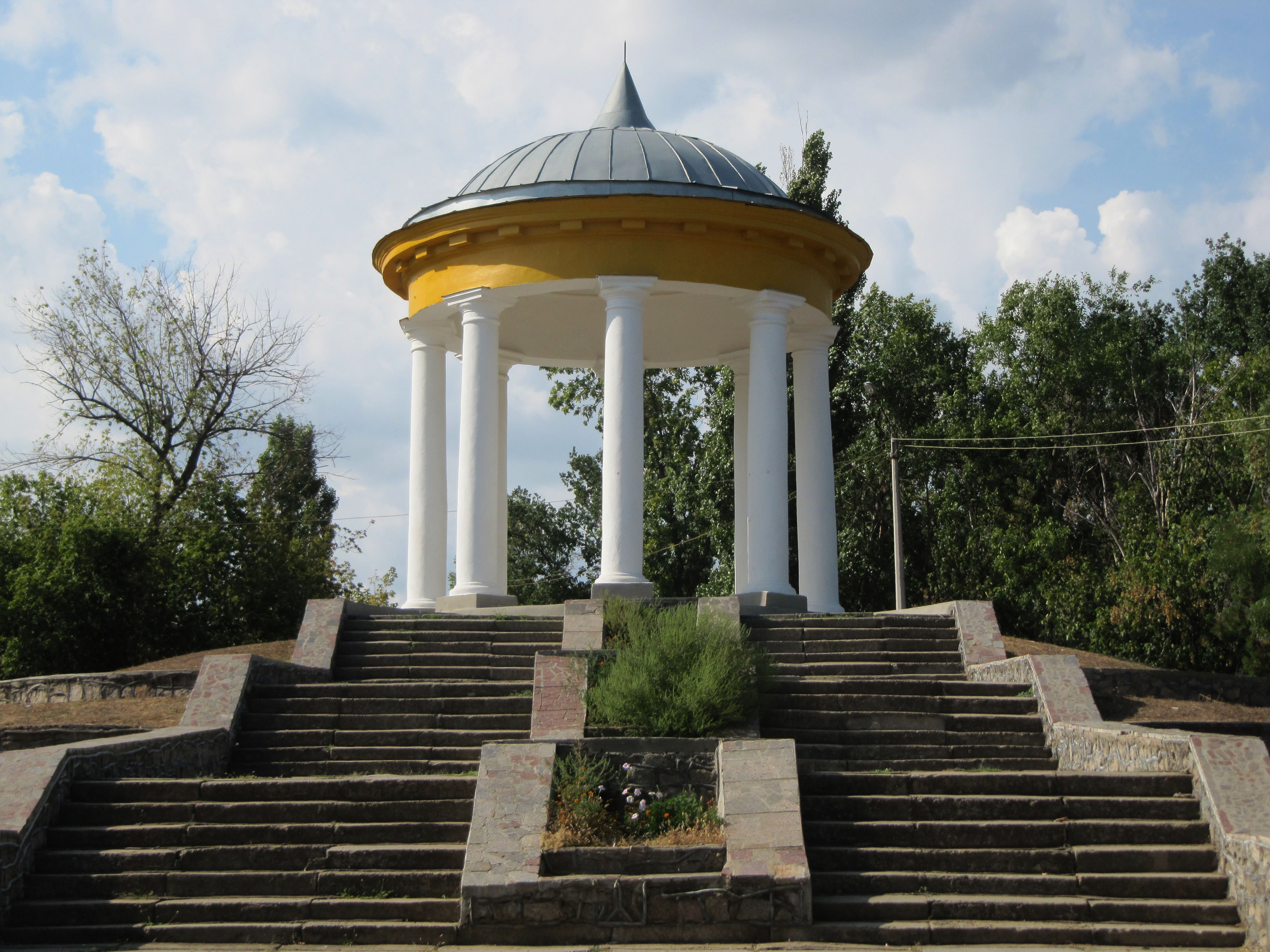
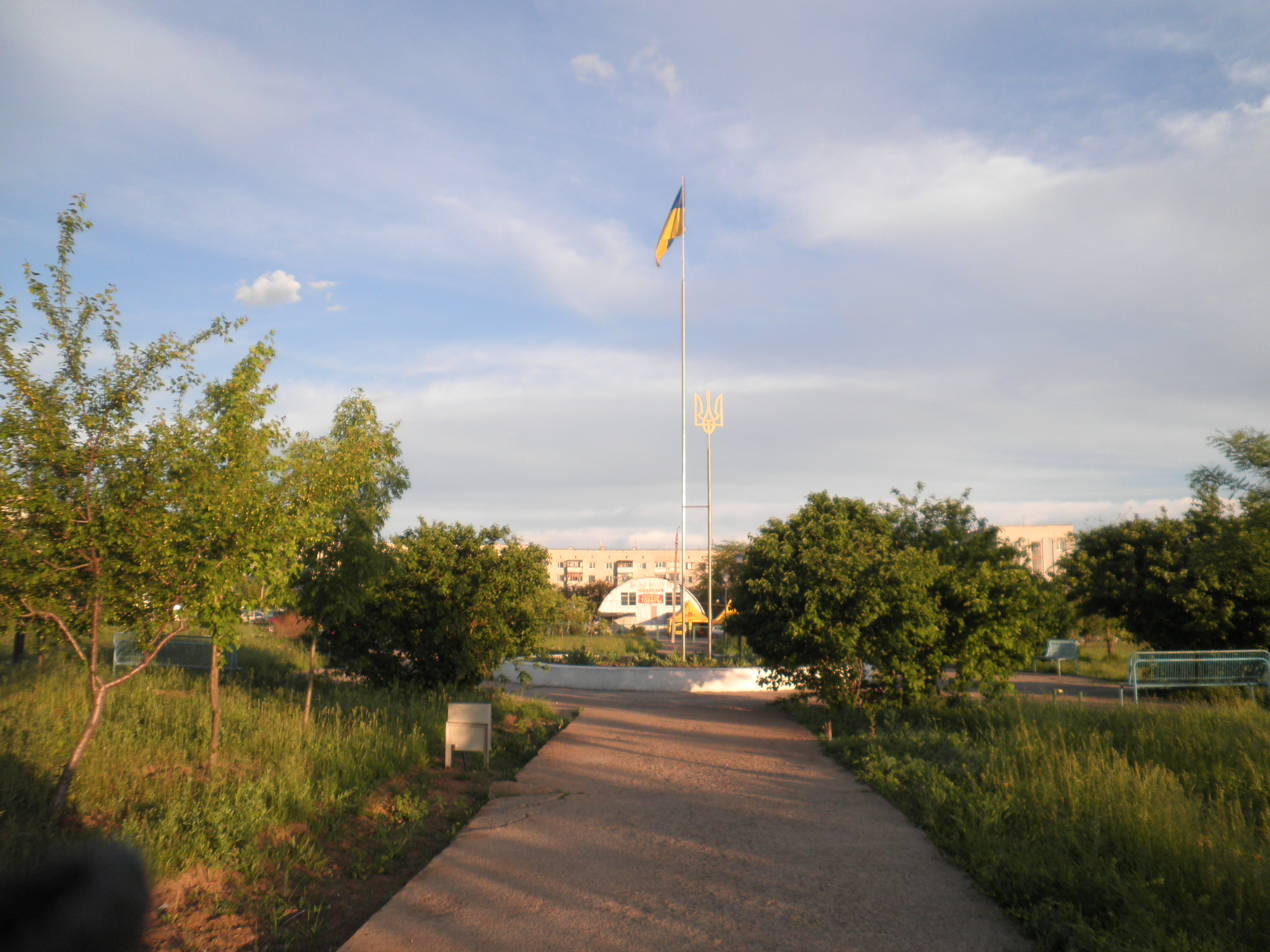
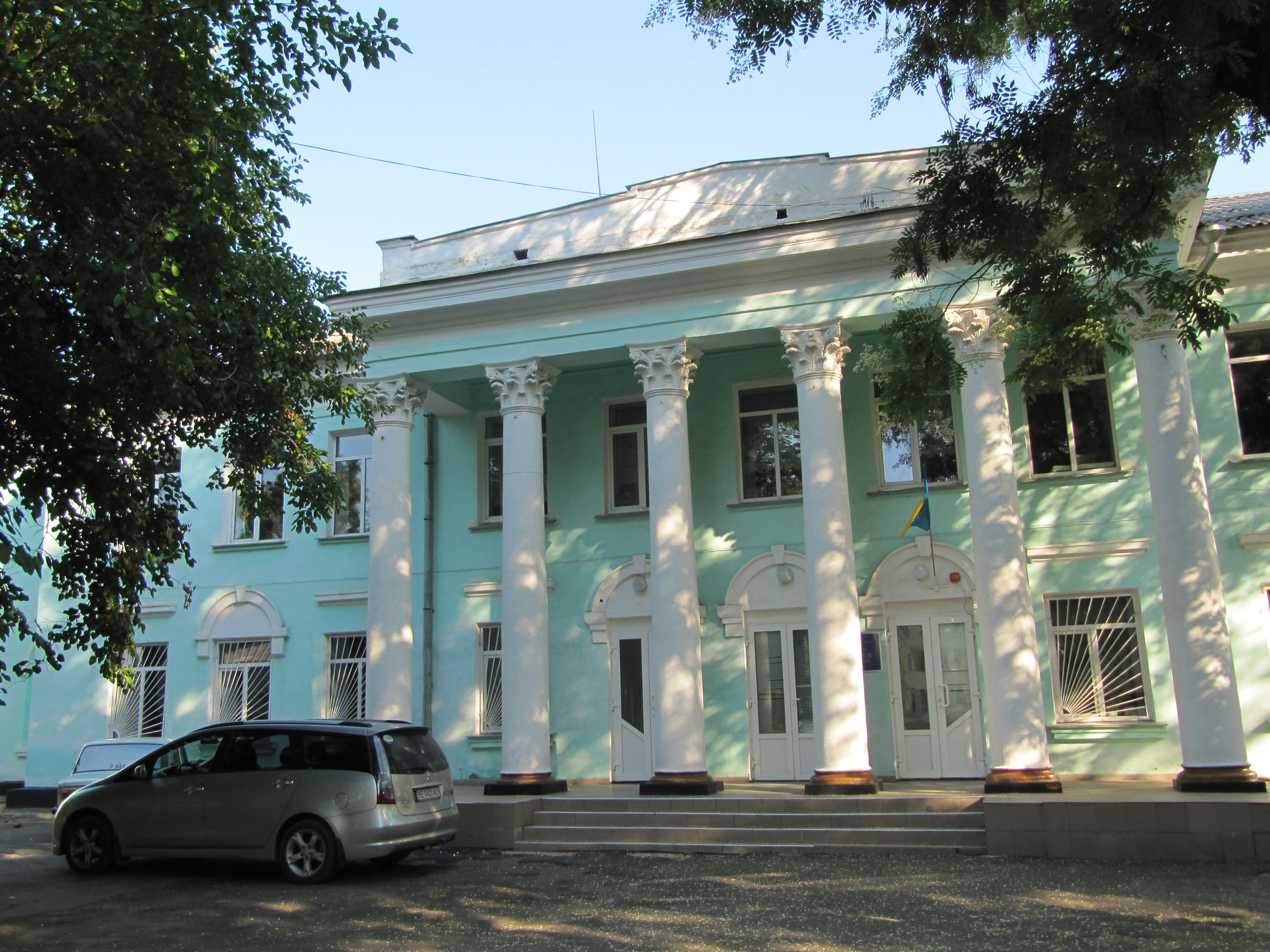
- Gazebo Park of Independence Palace of Culture

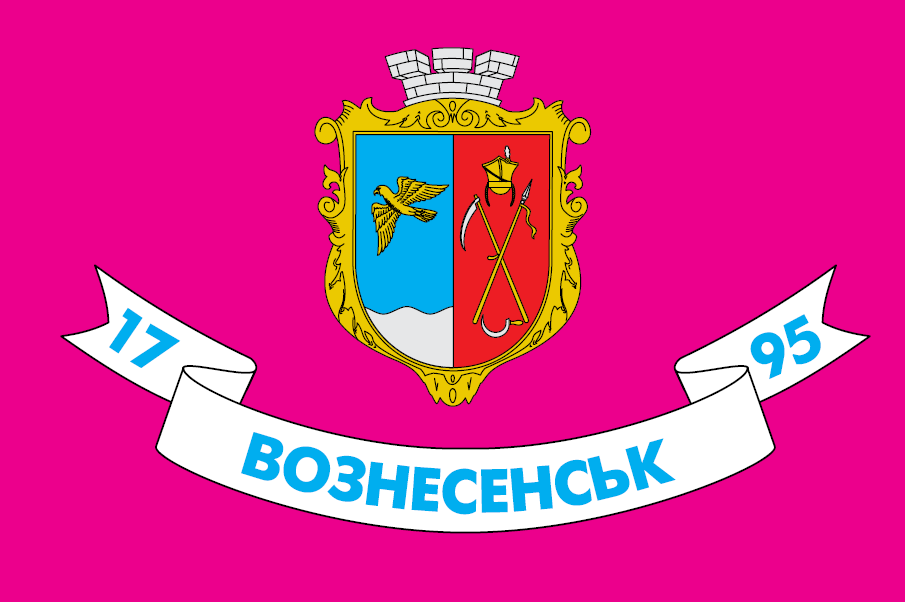
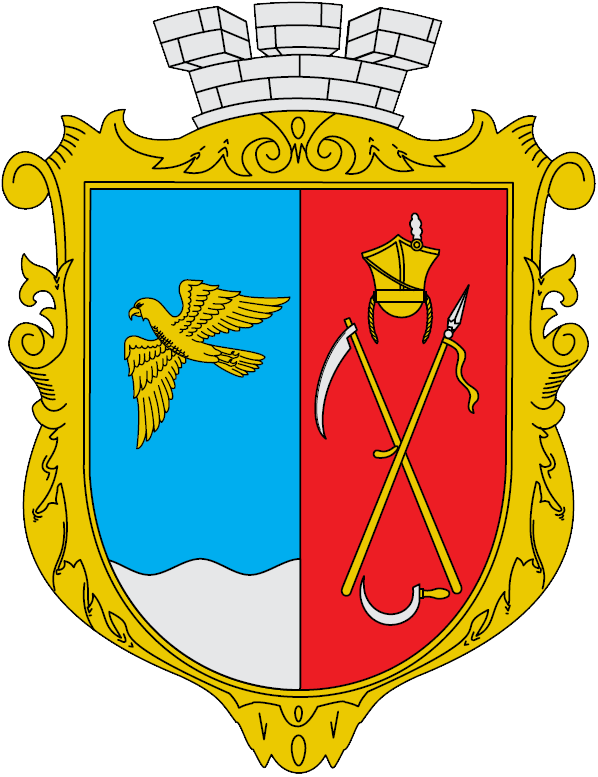
- Flag Seal
- Interactive map of Voznesensk
- Location within Mykolaiv Oblast Location within Ukraine
- Coordinates: 47°34′N 31°18′E
- Country: Ukraine
- Oblast: Mykolaiv Oblast
- Raion: Voznesensk Raion
- Hromada: Voznesensk urban hromada
- Founded: 1795

Area
  - Total: 22.56 km^{2} (8.71 sq mi)

Population (2022)
  - Total: 33,442
- Website: www.voznesensk.org

Voznesensk (Ukrainian: Вознесенськ, IPA: [wozneˈsɛnʲsʲk]) is a city in Mykolaiv Oblast, Ukraine. It serves as the administrative center of Voznesensk Raion within the oblast. It hosts the administration of the Voznesensk urban hromada. The city has a population of 33,442 (2022 estimate).

== History ==
In middle 18th century here was the center of Buh-Hard Palanka of Zaporozhian Sich. This city was founded in 1795 on the site of the Cossack settlement of Sokoly after the liquidation of the Zaporozhian Sich. Previously located in Novomyrhorod, in 1796 the administration of the newly created Imperial Russian namestnichestvo was transferred to Voznesensk. Creation of the new territory occurred in place of the Ochakov Land (Oblast), following the 1788 conquest of the Ochakov Fortress (Özi Cale) as well as liquidation of the Zaporozhian Sich earlier in 1775.

Located on the banks of the Southern Bug, Voznesensk became a center of the Bug Cossacks who later were transformed into regiment of light-cavalry uhlans. During the Ukrainian War of Independence, from 1917 to 1920, it passed between various factions. Afterwards, it was administratively part of the Odesa Governorate of Ukraine.

Voznesensk received city status in 1938.

During World War II, the city was occupied by Axis troops from August 1941 until March 1944.

Voznesensk was the seat of the Soviet 1411th Artillery Ammunition Depot from July 1945 to May 1949.

In January 1989, the population of the city was 43,881 people. Following Ukrainian independence in 1991, it became a part of Ukraine.

Until 18 July 2020, Voznesensk was incorporated as a city of regional significance. It also served as the administrative center of Voznesensk Raion even though it did not belong to the raion. In July 2020, as part of the administrative reform of Ukraine, which reduced the number of raions of Mykolaiv Oblast to four, the city of Voznesensk was merged into Voznesensk Raion.

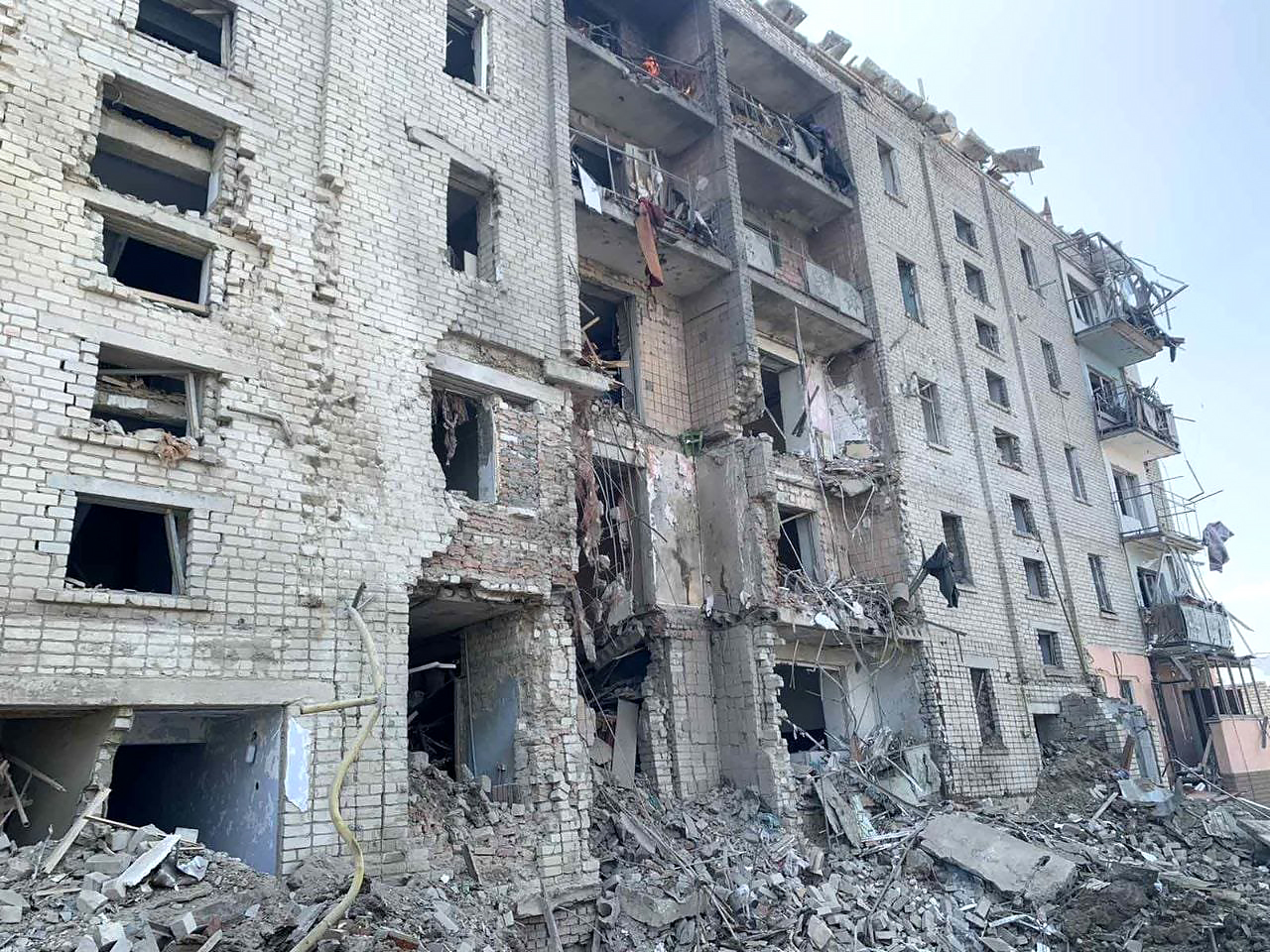
Voznesensk after Russian shelling on 20 August 2022

During the 2022 Russian invasion of Ukraine, the city saw shelling and fighting as part of the Battle of Mykolaiv and the Battles of Voznesensk. The city was a key objective for Russian forces, who sought to capture an important intersection on the route between Mykolaiv and Odesa, and cross the Southern Buh river immediately southwest of the city. Securing this intersection was an essential prerequisite for any subsequent offensive towards Odesa, as it would allow Russian tanks and armored fighting vehicles access to the most suitable highway to the city. The battle began on 2 March, when a Russian armored column was defeated by Ukrainian forces in the vicinity of Voznesensk, in a battle which the Wall Street Journal described as "one of the war's most decisive routs" up to that point. (Note: On 2–3 March 2022 a Russian battalion tactical group (BTG) was routed by Ukrainian troops and volunteers; the local residents of Voznesensk constructed defenses to funnel BTG vehicles into locations where they could be destroyed in structured ambushes; Russian troops abandoned nearly two-thirds of their tanks, infantry fighting vehicles, multiple-rocket launchers and trucks in Voznesensk.) The Ukrainian army, in cooperation with local farmers, destroyed a strategically important bridge, over which the Russians aimed to cross the Southern Bug. Additionally, the Ukrainian fighters destroyed around 30 Russian tanks and armored vehicles and one helicopter, thereby preventing any further Russian advance towards Odesa and a nearby nuclear facility.

On 20 August 2022, a Russian airstrike on Voznesensk killed 9 civilians, 4 of which were children.

== Demographics ==
As of the national census in 2001, Voznesensk had a population of 42,248 people. The overwhelming majority of the city's population are Ukrainians. Sizeable ethnic Russian, Moldovan, Belarusian and Jewish communities also dwell in the city. In terms of languages, 86% of the residents consider Ukrainian to be their first language, while 12% communicate in Russian.

Ethnic groups in Voznesensk
| | percent |
| Ukrainians | 87.05% |
| Russians | 9.74% |
| Moldovans | 0.73% |
| Belarusians | 0.47% |
| Jews | 0.24% |
| Armenians | 0.24% |
| Bulgarians | 0.21% |
| Azerbaijanis | 0.10% |
| Poles | 0.08% |
| Tatars | 0.08% |

Native languages in Voznesensk
| | percent |
| Ukrainian | 86.5% |
| Russian | 12.5% |
| Moldovan (Romanian) | 0.3% |
| Armenian | 0.1% |
| Belarusian | 0.1% |
| others | 0.3% |

== Transportation ==
The Voznesensk railway station is an important stop along the Odesa railroad, with direct trains available to major cities including Kyiv and Dnipro. The main bus station offers many destinations including buses to Kyiv, Mykolaiv and Kherson. Local marshrutkas (route buses) run from the center to all of the cities' microregions and surrounding villages as well as every half-hour to Mykolaiv.

== Education ==
Voznesensk has nine schools, a lyceum, a technicum, and a college.

== Recreation ==
Voznesensk has many available recreational opportunities. The city is situated along the Southern Buh river, where residents swim, fish, and relax on the riverbanks. To the north of Voznesensk, near Pervomaisk, the Southern Buh flows through a canyon which is famous for its whitewater rafting and mountain climbing. The stadium in the center of Voznesensk features a football pitch, tennis court, track, and playground. The sports club "VOSCO" in the third microregion has an indoor basketball/tennis court as well as a weight training room. In fall 2012, a new sports complex in the center, "Waterfall", opened, which has a swimming pool, training room and saunas.

== Notable people ==
- Dmytro Marchenko (born 1978), Ukrainian military officer
- Heorhii Chyzhevskyi (born 1924), Ukrainian masters swimmer and war veteran
- Yevgeny Kibrik (1906-1978), a well-known artist who was born and grew up in Voznesensk. There is a museum featuring his art on Sobornosti Street, formerly called Lenina Street.

== Geography ==
=== Climate ===
Climate data for Voznesensk (1981–2010)
| Month | Jan | Feb | Mar | Apr | May | Jun | Jul | Aug | Sep | Oct | Nov | Dec | Year |
|---|---|---|---|---|---|---|---|---|---|---|---|---|---|
| Mean daily maximum °C (°F) | 1.0 (33.8) | 2.4 (36.3) | — | 16.6 (61.9) | 23.3 (73.9) | 26.8 (80.2) | 29.3 (84.7) | 29.0 (84.2) | 22.8 (73.0) | 15.8 (60.4) | 7.5 (45.5) | 2.4 (36.3) | 15.4 (59.7) |
| Daily mean °C (°F) | −2.2 (28.0) | −1.4 (29.5) | 3.4 (38.1) | 10.5 (50.9) | 16.7 (62.1) | 20.4 (68.7) | 22.7 (72.9) | 22.1 (71.8) | 16.3 (61.3) | 10.2 (50.4) | 3.8 (38.8) | −0.5 (31.1) | 10.2 (50.4) |
| Mean daily minimum °C (°F) | −4.9 (23.2) | −4.6 (23.7) | −0.5 (31.1) | 5.2 (41.4) | 10.4 (50.7) | 14.5 (58.1) | 16.4 (61.5) | 15.6 (60.1) | 10.8 (51.4) | 5.7 (42.3) | 0.8 (33.4) | −3.2 (26.2) | 5.5 (41.9) |
| Average precipitation mm (inches) | 29.2 (1.15) | 30.6 (1.20) | 28.6 (1.13) | 33.0 (1.30) | 48.4 (1.91) | 65.8 (2.59) | 62.7 (2.47) | 49.6 (1.95) | 50.2 (1.98) | 34.2 (1.35) | 36.6 (1.44) | 34.3 (1.35) | 503.2 (19.81) |
| Average precipitation days (≥ 1.0 mm) | 6.1 | 6.3 | 5.9 | 6.3 | 7.1 | 8.4 | 6.9 | 5.2 | 5.1 | 4.7 | 5.8 | 6.5 | 74.3 |
| Average relative humidity (%) | 82.3 | 79.5 | 73.8 | 65.2 | 63.0 | 65.8 | 63.5 | 61.8 | 68.9 | 75.2 | 82.4 | 83.4 | 72.1 |
Source: World Meteorological Organization

== Gallery ==
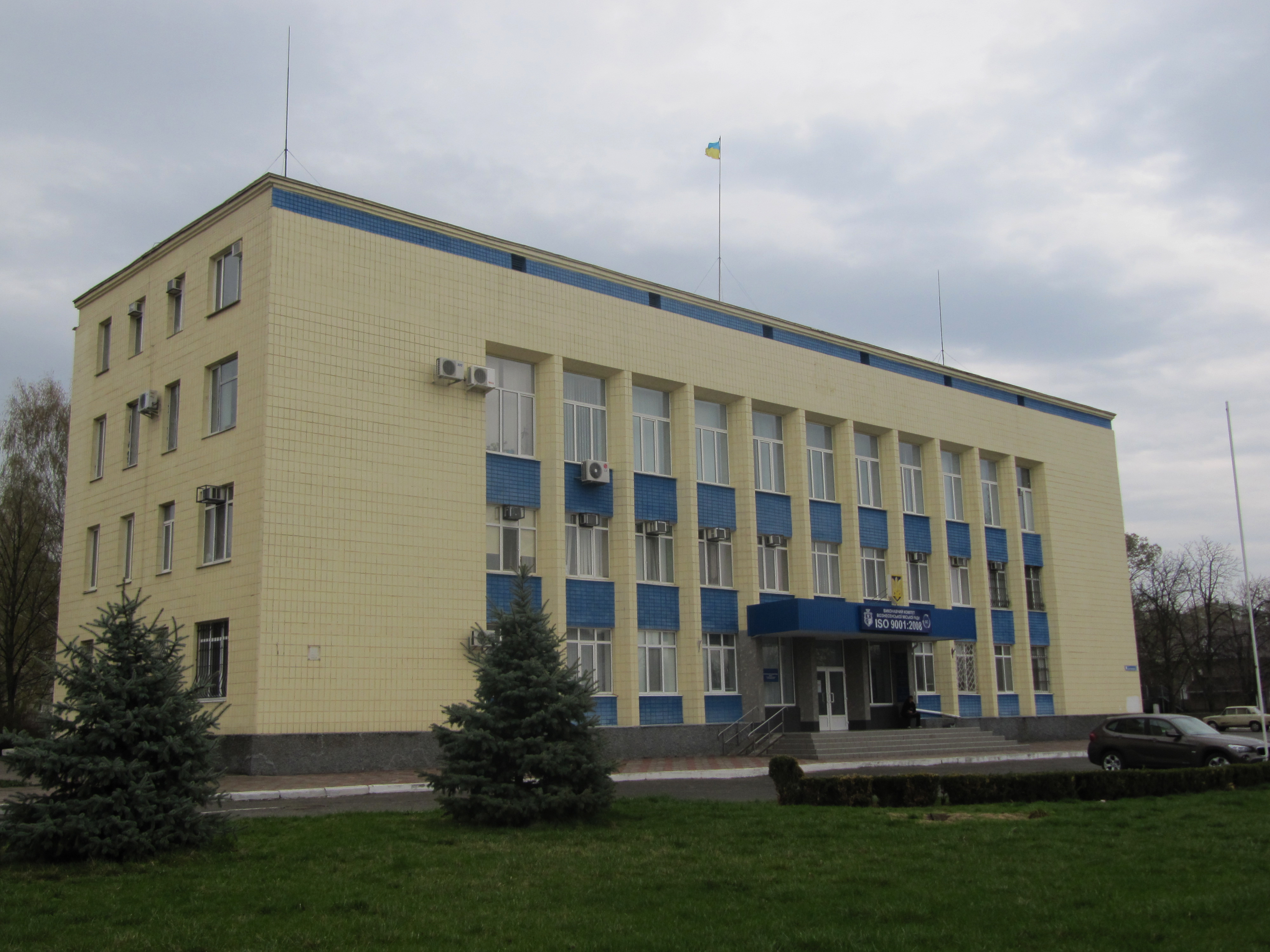
Voznesensk city hall

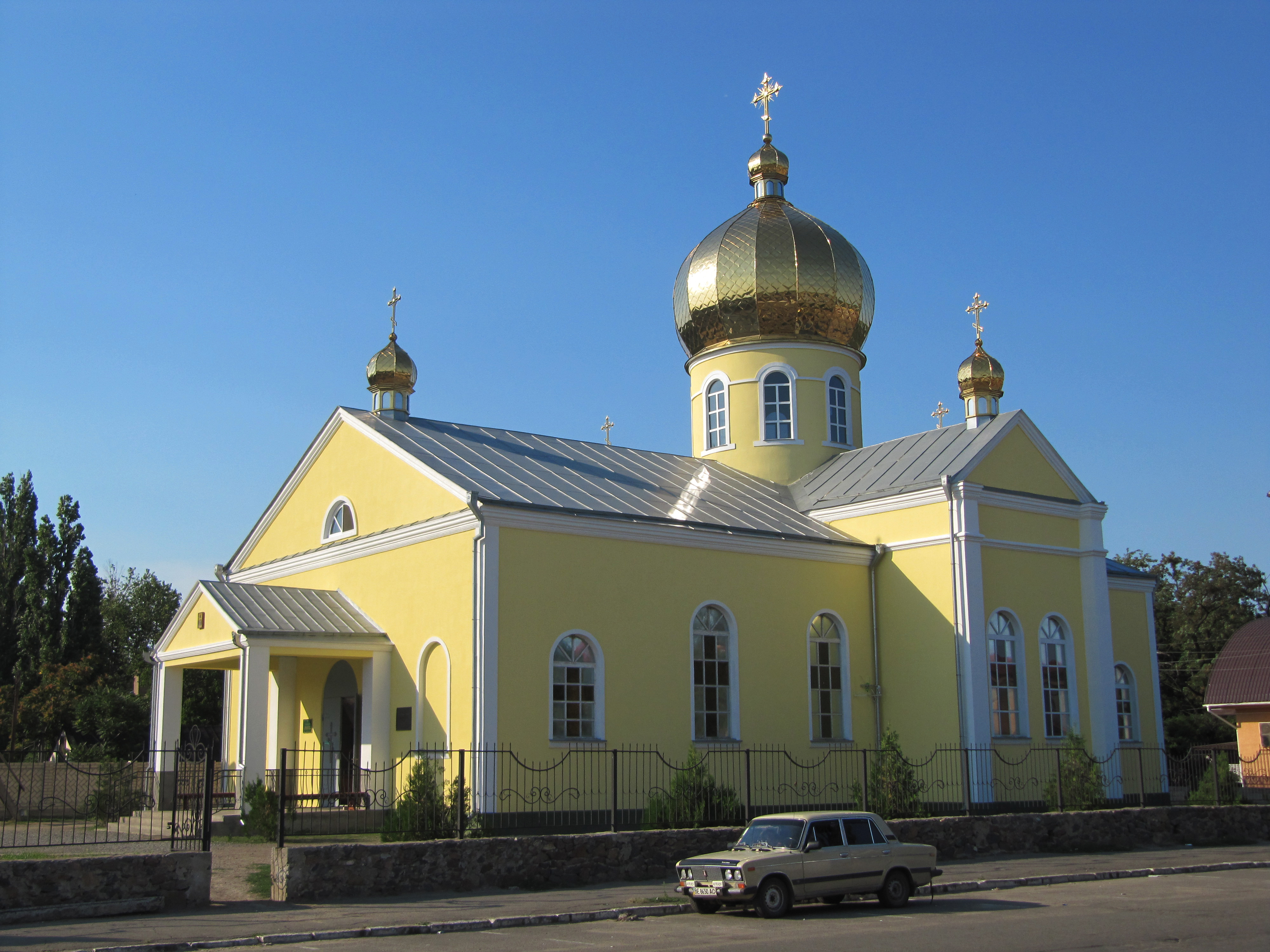
Ascension Cathedral

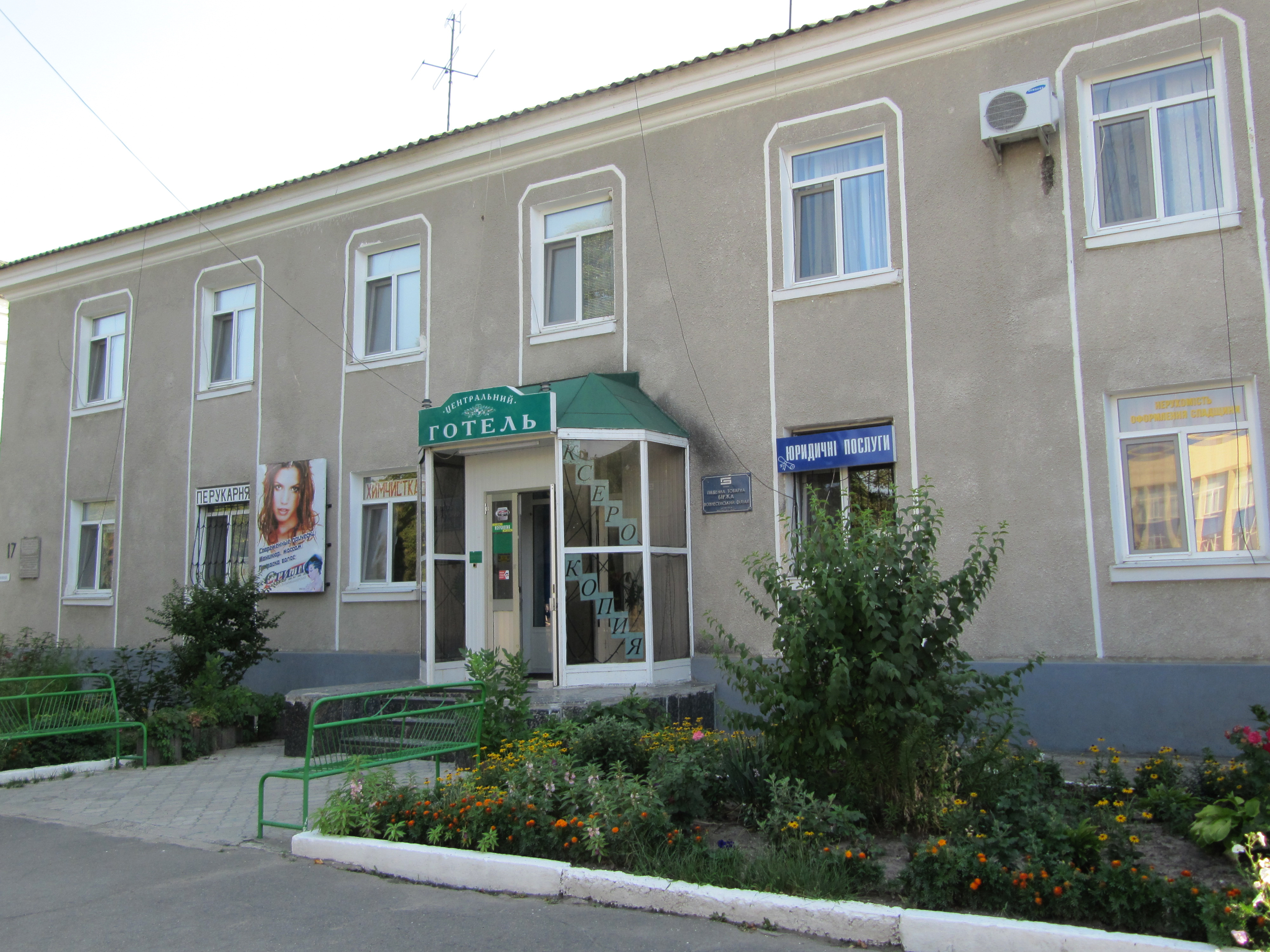
Central hotel

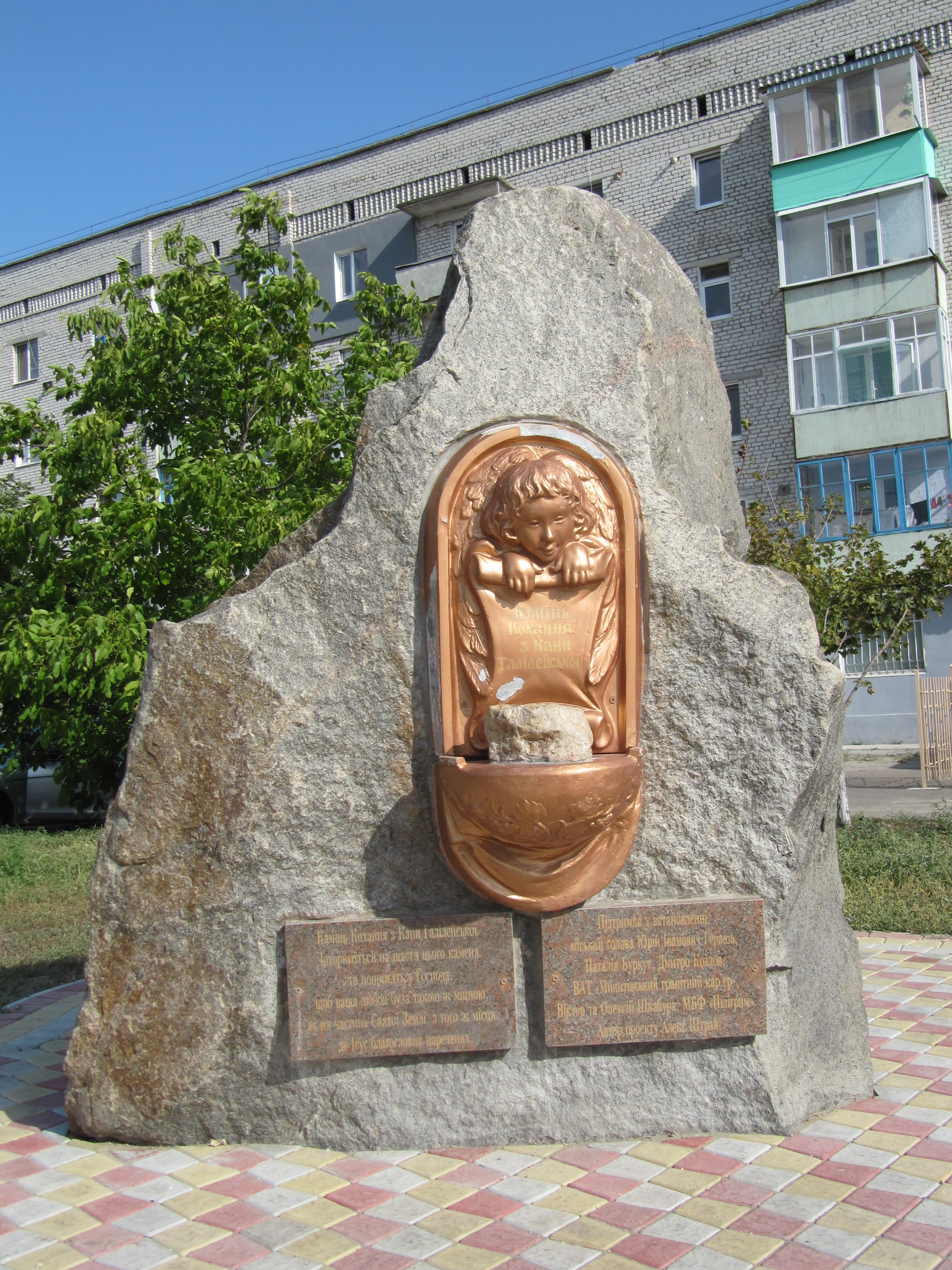
Stone of love monument

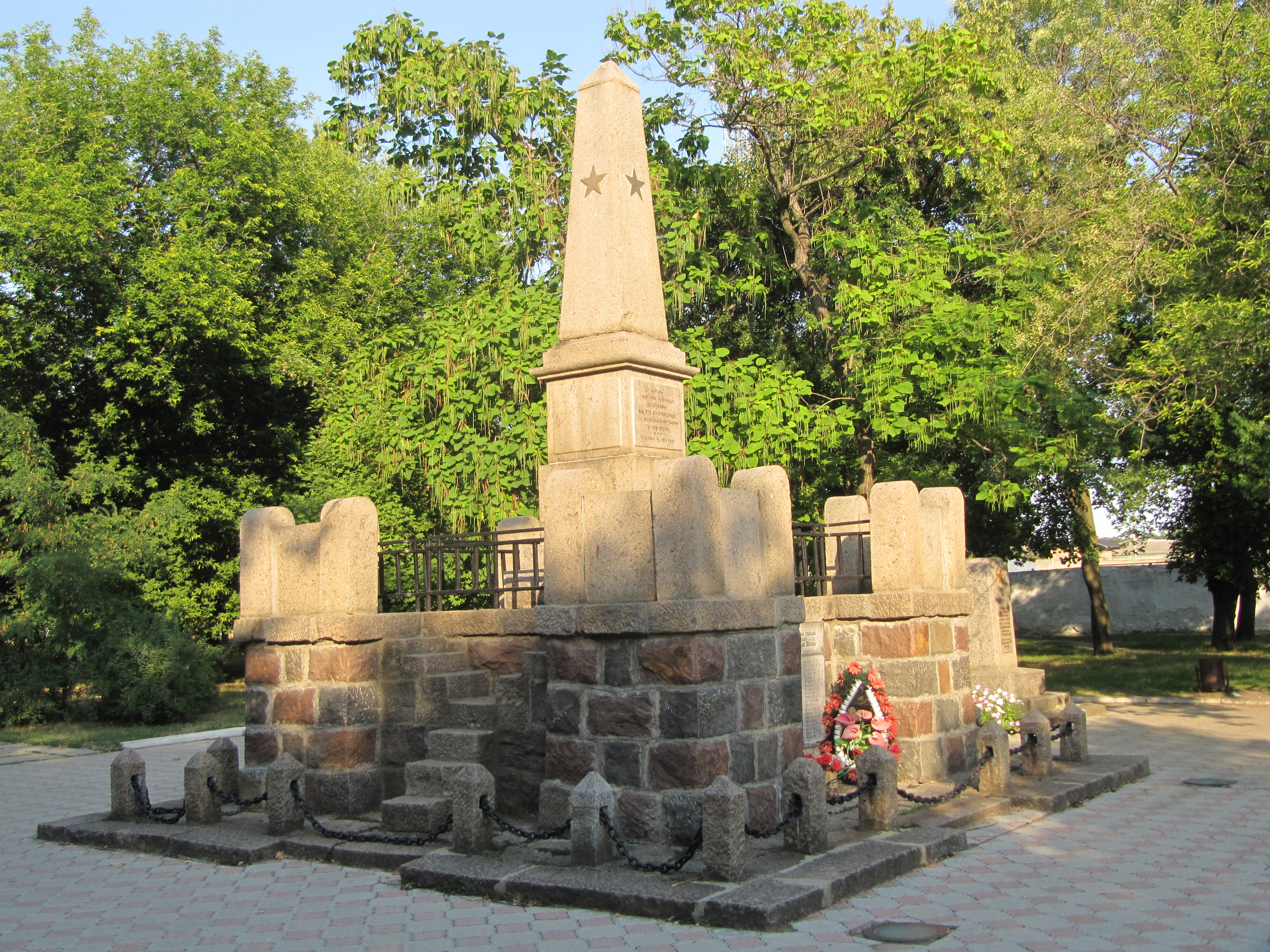
Socialist revolution monument

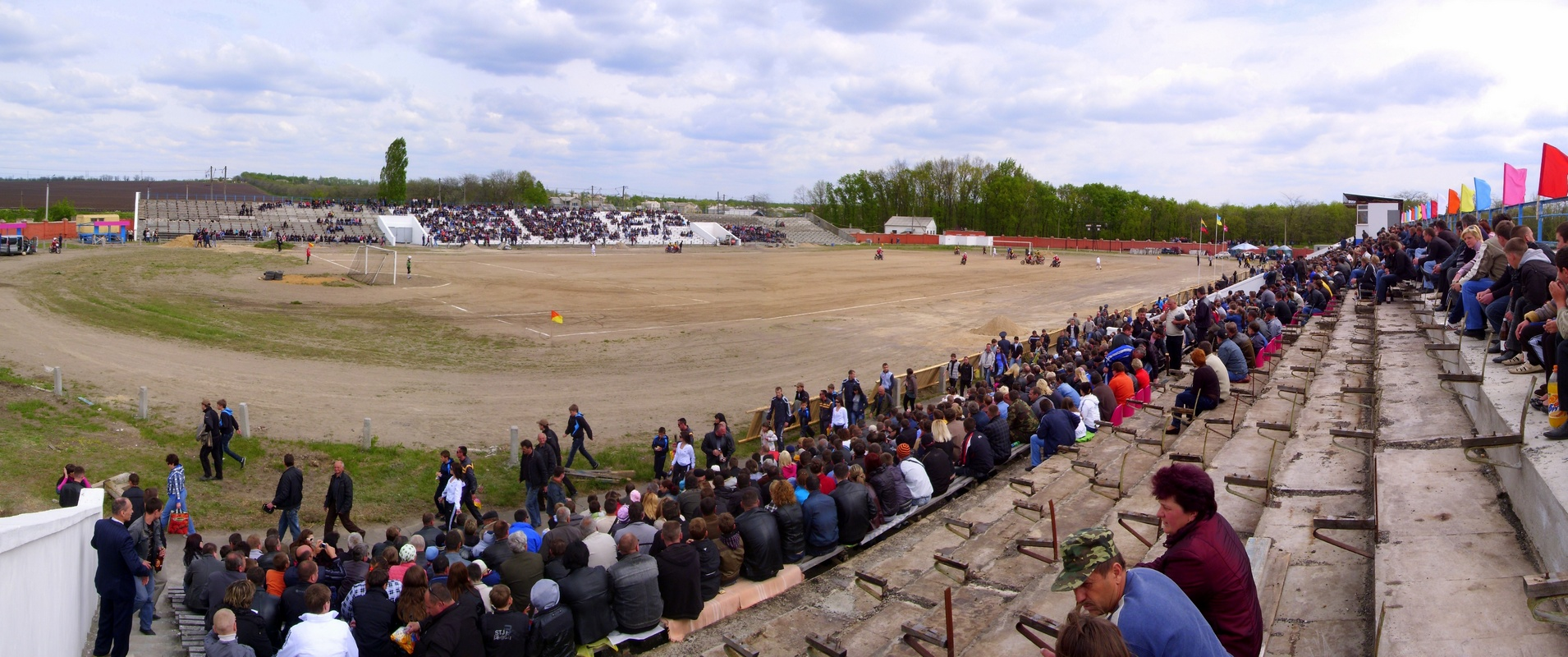
Voznesensk motorcycle track

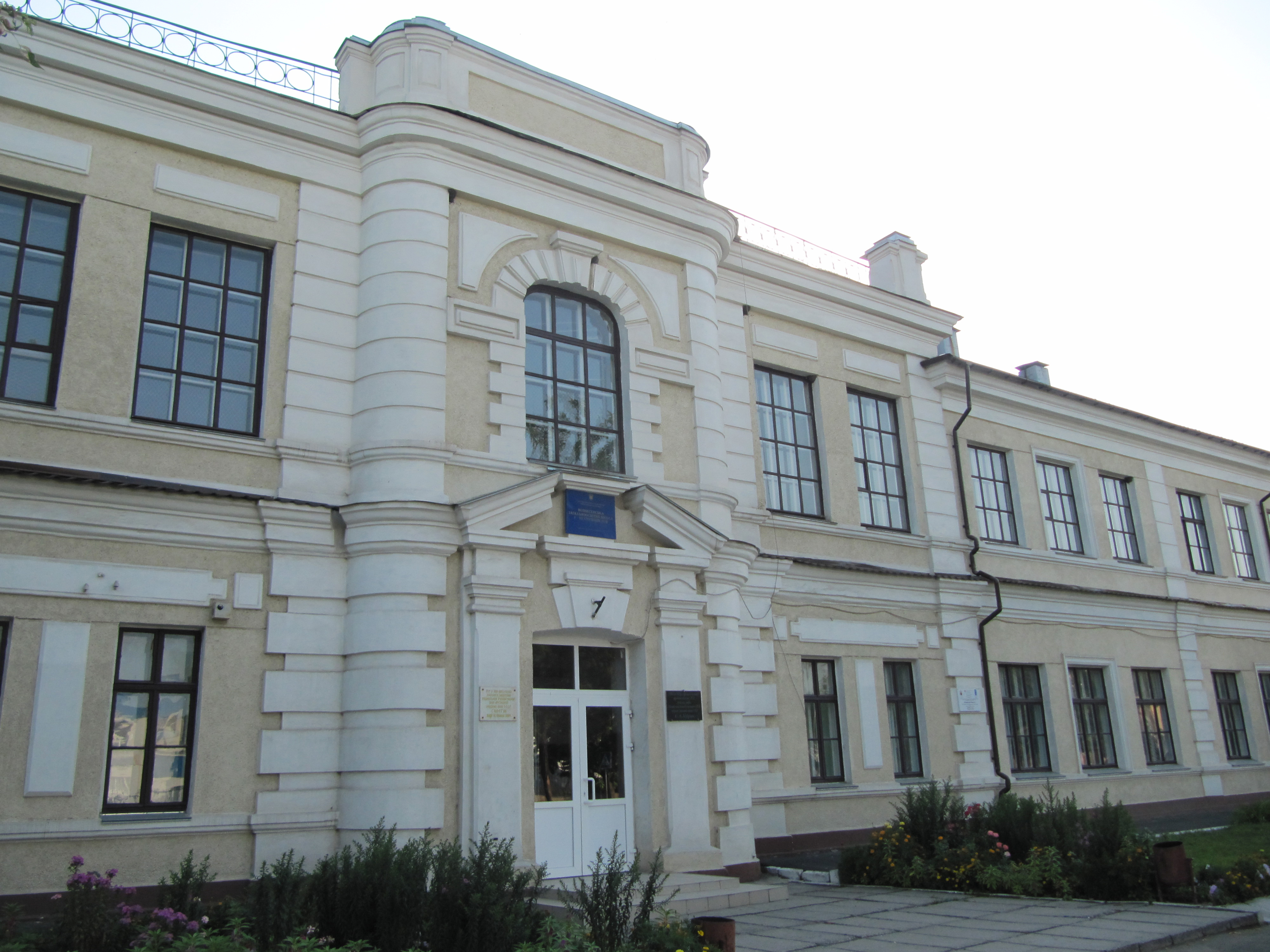
School no. 10

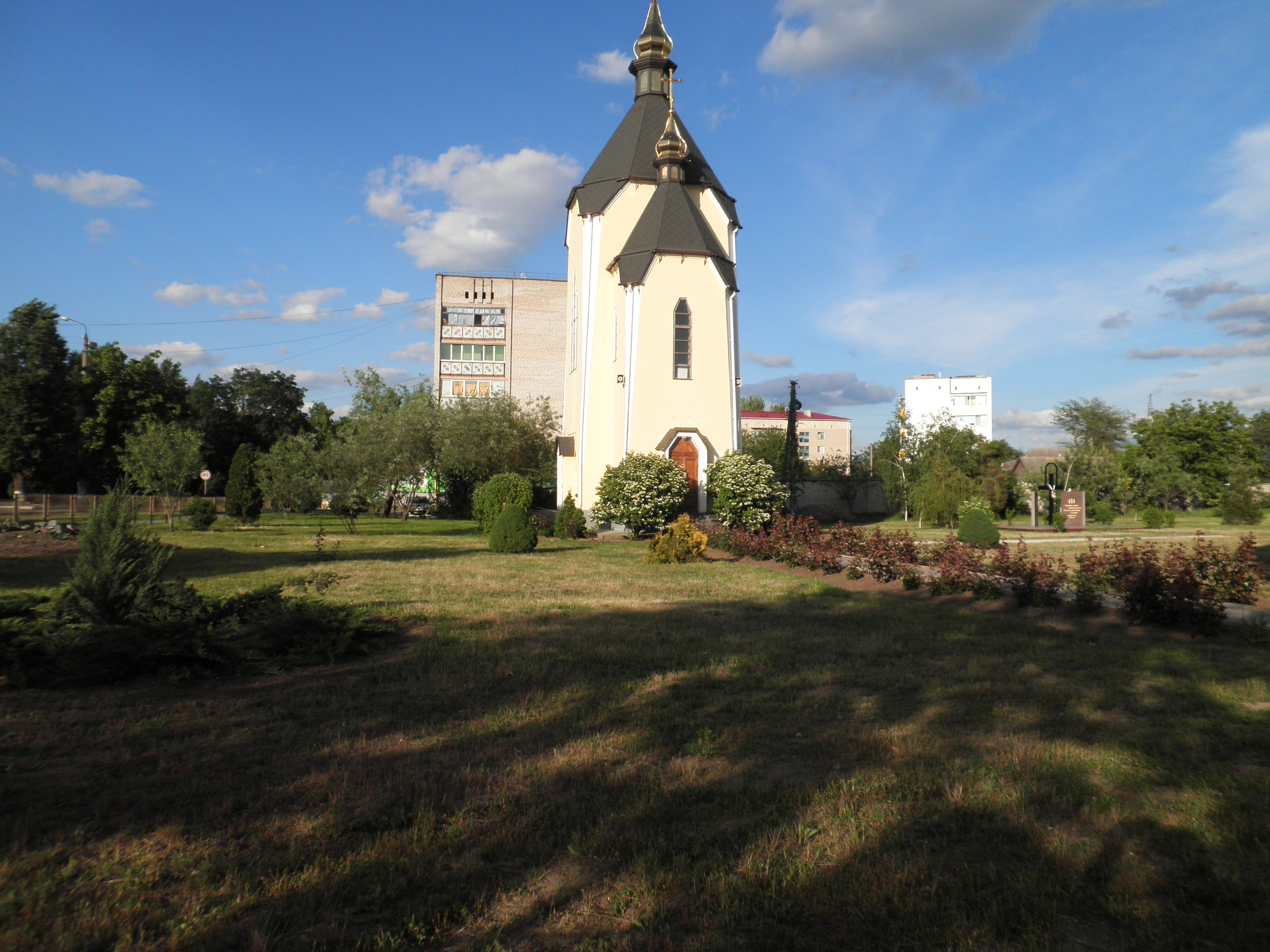
Church of Saint Olga with bell tower
