= Order of Bohdan Khmelnytsky =

Ukrainian military decoration

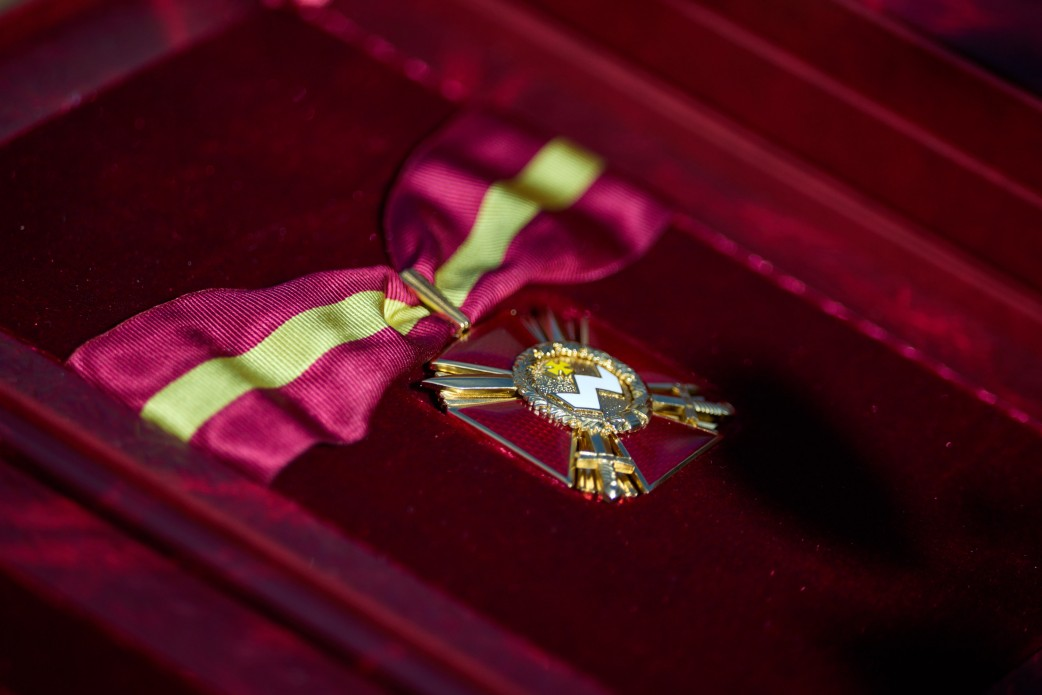
- Order Bohdan Khmelnytsky
- Type: 3 grade order
- Awarded for: Exceptional duty in defense of state sovereignty and state security; veterans of World War II
- Presented by: Ukraine
- Eligibility: Military and Security Personnel, other citizens of Ukraine
- Status: Currently awarded
- Established: May 3, 1995
- First award: May 7, 1995 (3rd Class)
- Ribbon of the Order of Bohdan Khmelnitsky

Precedence
- Next (higher): Order of Merit
- Next (lower): Order of the Heavenly Hundred Heroes

The Order of Bohdan Khmelnytsky (Ukrainian: Орден Богдана Хмельницького, romanized: Orden Bohdana Khmelnytskoho) is a Ukrainian military award named after Bohdan Khmelnytsky, Hetman of the Ukrainian Cossacks. The award was established on May 3, 1995 by Ukrainian president Leonid Kuchma to commemorate the 50th anniversary of the end of the Second World War in Europe. It had been proposed by Oleksandr Moroz on April 27, 1995.

== Medals and ribbons ==
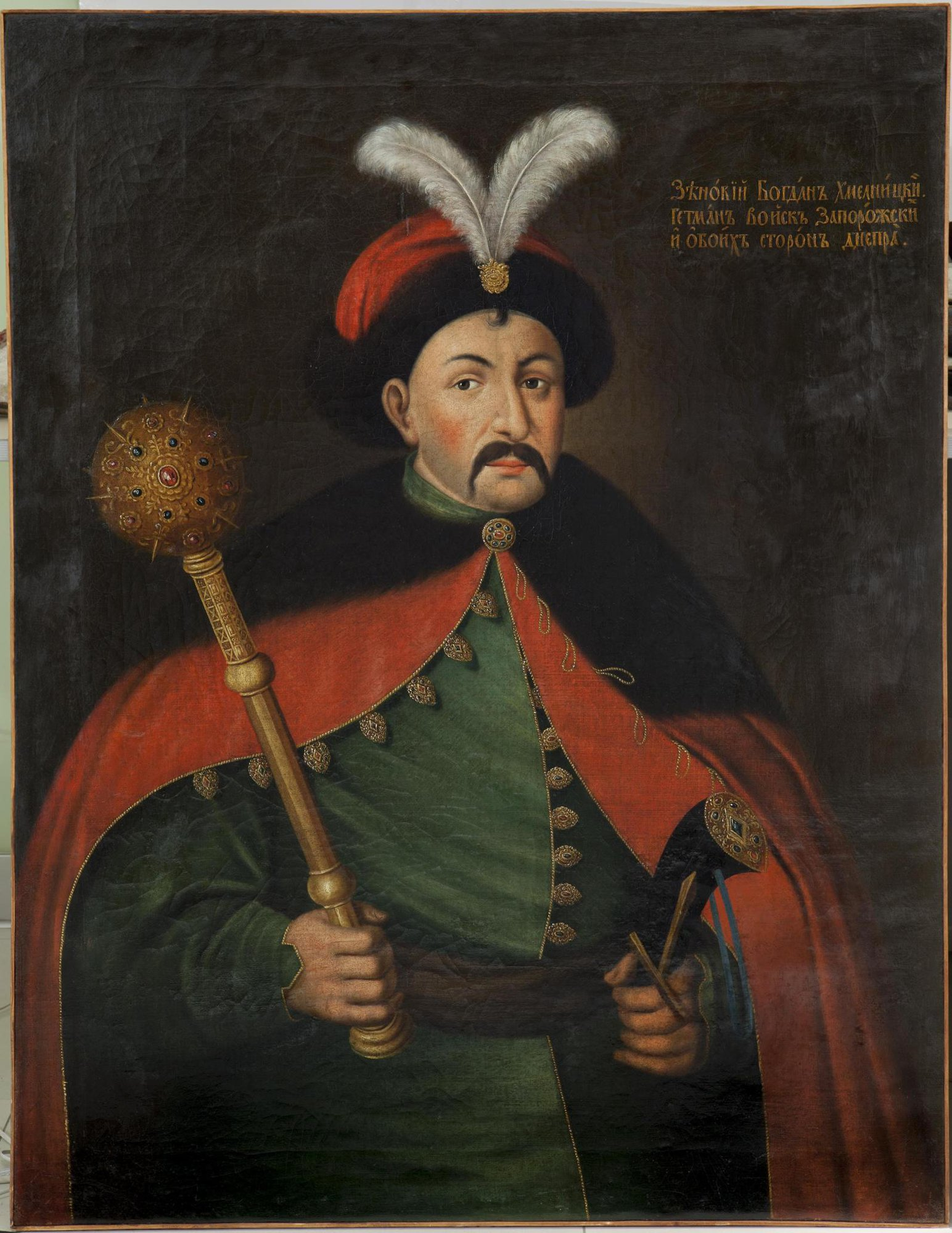
Bohdan Khmelnytsky

First Class	Second Class	Third Class
The center consists of the coat of arms of Bohdan Khmelnytsky, wreathed by golden oak leaves. This is superimposed over two diagonally crossed golden swords. A red cross with all points of equal height and width is beneath this. The bottom of the medallion consists of a golden star with many points.	The center consists of the coat of arms of Bohdan Khmelnytsky, wreathed by golden oak leaves. This is superimposed over two diagonally crossed silver swords. A red cross with all points of equal height and width is beneath this. The bottom of the medallion consists of a silver star with many points.	The center consists of the coat of arms of Bohdan Khmelnytsky, wreathed by silver oak leaves. This is superimposed over two diagonally crossed silver swords. A red cross with all points of equal height and width is beneath this. The bottom of the medallion consists of a silver star with many points.
Ribbon
A wide band of gold is centered on the red ribbon.	In the center of the red ribbon is a wide band of white, which has two thin bands of blue on either side. On the outside of the blue bands are bands of gold of the same width.	In the center of the red ribbon is a wide band of gold, which has two thin bands of blue on either side. On the outside of the blue bands are gold bands, and on the outside of those bands are white bands.

== See also ==
- Order of Bogdan Khmelnitsky (Soviet Union)
