= Orders, decorations, and medals of Ukraine =

Awards and decorations of Ukraine are medals and orders granted by the President of Ukraine for meritorious achievements in national defense, state improvement, and the development of democracy and human rights. Awards may also be issued to military personnel of the Ukrainian Armed Forces and worn in conjunction with awards and decorations of the Ukrainian military.

This article lists major orders, decorations, medals, honorary titles, state prizes, and presidential distinctions of Ukraine.

== Titles ==
=== Highest distinction ===
Ribbon	Name (English/Ukrainian)	Date of creation Date of approval	Award Criteria
	Hero of Ukraine; Герой України	1998	Highest national title that can be conferred upon an individual citizen by the President of Ukraine. The title is supported by two orders: one for heroism and the other for achievement in labor.

=== Honorary title ===
Ribbon	Name (English/Ukrainian)	Date of creation Date of approval	Award Criteria
	People's Artist of Ukraine; Народний артист України	1922	Special title to performing artists for outstanding performing mastery, creating of highly artistic images, plays, featured films that earned international recognition, for special merits in development of national cultural and artistic heritage
	People's Architect of Ukraine; Народний архітектор України		Special title to architects and architect restoration specialists for outstanding merits in development of architecture and urban planning
	People's Teacher of Ukraine; Народний вчитель України	2006	Special title to teachers, instructors and other pedagogic workers of educational institutions in a system of general secondary education of all types for outstanding achievements in teaching and raising of pupils and students
	People's Painter of Ukraine; Народний художник України	1934	Special title to workers of visual, monumental and decorative arts for creation of highly artistic works in the field of painting, graphic, sculptural, decorative and applied arts that achieved a wide national and international recognition
	Merited Performing Artist of Ukraine; Заслужений артист України	1922	Special title to performing artists for outstanding achievement in the performing arts
	Mother-Heroine; Мати-героїня	2004	Special title to women who given birth and raised five children, including fostered children, to the age of 8.

== Orders ==
Ribbon	Name (English/Ukrainian)	Date of creation Date of approval	Award Criteria
	Order of State / Order of Gold Star; Орден Держави / Орден Золотої Зірки	1998	Highest national award to citizens for accomplishing a remarkable work achievement / for accomplishing a remarkable heroic act. It is awarded along with the Hero of Ukraine title.
	Order of Liberty; Орден Свободи	2008	Special merits of citizens for strengthening the Sovereignty and Independence of Ukraine, consolidating Ukrainian society, developing Democracy, advancing socio-economic and political reforms, and advocating the Constitutional Rights and Liberties of Man and Citizen.
	Order of Prince Yaroslav the Wise; 1st Class; Орден князя Ярослава Мудрого; I ступеня	1995	Distinguished services.
	Order of Prince Yaroslav the Wise; 2nd Class; Орден князя Ярослава Мудрого; II ступеня	1995	Distinguished services.
	Order of Prince Yaroslav the Wise; 3rd Class; Орден князя Ярослава Мудрого; III ступеня	1995	Distinguished services.
	Order of Prince Yaroslav the Wise; 4th Class; Орден князя Ярослава Мудрого; IV ступеня	1995	Distinguished services.
	Order of Prince Yaroslav the Wise; 5th Class; Орден князя Ярослава Мудрого; V ступеня	1995	Distinguished services.
	Order of Merit; 1st Class; Орден «За заслуги» I ступеня	1996	Outstanding achievements in economics, science, culture, military or political spheres of activity.
	Order of Merit; 2nd Class; Орден «За заслуги» II ступеня	1996	Outstanding achievements in economics, science, culture, military or political spheres of activity.
	Order of Merit; 3rd Class; Орден «За заслуги» III ступеня	1996	Outstanding achievements in economics, science, culture, military or political spheres of activity.
	Order of Bohdan Khmelnytsky; 1st Class; Орден Богдана Хмельницького; I ступеня	1995	Military award
	Order of Bohdan Khmelnytsky; 2nd Class; Орден Богдана Хмельницького; II ступеня	1995	Military award
	Order of Bohdan Khmelnytsky; 3rd Class; Орден Богдана Хмельницького; III ступеня	1995	Military award
	Order of the Heavenly Hundred Heroes; Орден Героїв Небесної Сотні	2014	Civil courage, patriotism and the defense of the constitutional principles of democracy.
	Order For Courage; 1st Class; Орден «За мужність» I ступеня	1996	Individual courage and heroism while rescuing people.
	Order For Courage; 2nd Class; Орден «За мужність» II ступеня	1996	Individual courage and heroism while rescuing people.
	Order For Courage; 3rd Class; Орден «За мужність» III ступеня	1996	Individual courage and heroism while rescuing people.
	Order of Princess Olga; 1st Class; Орден княгині Ольги; I ступеня	1997	Personal merits of women in state, scientific, educational, cultural and other social areas.
	Order of Princess Olga; 2nd Class; Орден княгині Ольги; II ступеня	1997	Personal merits of women in state, scientific, educational, cultural and other social areas.
	Order of Princess Olga; 3rd Class; Орден княгині Ольги; III ступеня	1997	Personal merits of women in state, scientific, educational, cultural and other social areas.
	Order of Danylo Halytsky; Орден Данила Галицького	2003	Military men of the Armed Forces of Ukraine and other military formations.
	Order For Brave Miners' Work; 1st Class; Орден «За доблесну шахтарську працю» I ступеня	2008	Workers of mine building enterprises.
	Order For Brave Miners' Work; 2nd Class; Орден «За доблесну шахтарську працю» II ступеня	2008	Workers of mine building enterprises.
	Order For Brave Miners' Work; 3rd Class; Орден «За доблесну шахтарську працю» III ступеня	2008	Workers of mine building enterprises.

== Medals ==
Ribbon	Name (English/Ukrainian)	Date of creation Date of approval	Award Criteria
	Medal For Military Service to Ukraine; Медаль «За військову службу Україні»	1996	Military men of the Armed Forces of Ukraine and other military formations.
	Medal For Irreproachable Service; 1st Class; Медаль «За бездоганну службу» I ступеня	1996	Military men of the Armed Forces of Ukraine and other military formations.
	Medal For Irreproachable Service; 2nd Class; Медаль «За бездоганну службу» II ступеня	1996	Military men of the Armed Forces of Ukraine and other military formations.
	Medal For Irreproachable Service; 3rd Class; Медаль «За бездоганну службу» III ступеня	1996	Military men of the Armed Forces of Ukraine and other military formations.
	Defender of the Motherland Medal; Медаль «Захиснику Вітчизни»	1999	War veterans.
	Medal "For Saving Life"; Медаль «За врятоване життя»	2008	Saving human life, acts of charity.
	"Brother For Brother" Medal	c. 2014	Foreigners for service to Ukraine.

== Presidential honors ==
Ribbon	Name (English/Ukrainian)	Date of creation Date of approval	Award Criteria
	Cross of Military Merit (Ukraine); Хрест бойових заслуг	2022	For outstanding personal bravery and bravery or an outstanding heroic deed when performing a combat mission in conditions of danger to life and direct collision with the enemy; outstanding successes in command and control of troops (forces) during military (combat) operations.
	Cross of Ivan Mazepa; Відзнака Президента України — Хрест Івана Мазепи	2009	Contribution to the revival of national and historical heritage of Ukraine.
	Medal For Labour and Victory; Відзнака Президента України — медаль «За працю і звитягу»	2001	Distinguished services.
	60 Years of Clearing of Ukraine from Fascist Aggressors Medal; Відзнака Президента України — ювілейна медаль «60 років визволення України від фашистських загарбників»	2004	World War II veterans.
	20 Years of Independence of Ukraine Medal; Відзнака Президента України — ювілейна медаль «20 років незалежності України»	2011	Distinguished services.
	25 Years of Independence of Ukraine Medal; Відзнака Президента України — ювілейна медаль «25 років незалежності України»	2016	Distinguished services.
	25 Years of Withdrawal from Afghanistan Medal; Відзнака Президента України — пам'ятна медаль «25 років виведення військ з Афганістану»	2014	Soviet–Afghan War veterans.
	70 Years of Clearing of Ukraine from Fascist Aggressors Medal; Відзнака Президента України — медаль «70 років визволення України від фашистських загарбників»	2014	World War II veterans.
	70 Years of Victory over Nazism; Відзнака Президента України — ювілейна медаль «70 років Перемоги над нацизмом»	2015	World War II veterans.
	Decorations of the President of Ukraine for Participation in the Anti-Terrorist Operation; Відзнака Президента України «За участь в антитерористичній операції»	2016	Defenders of Ukraine's sovereignty and territorial integrity in the framework of the Anti-Terrorist Operation in Donetsk and Luhansk regions.
	Decorations of the President of Ukraine for Humanitarian Participation in the Anti-Terrorist Operation; Відзнака Президента України «За гуманітарну участь в антитерористичній операції»	2016	Humanitarian Participations in Anti-Terrorist Operation in Donetsk and Luhansk regions.

== State Prizes ==
- Shevchenko National Prize
- State Prize of Ukraine in the Field of Architecture
- State Prize of Ukraine in the field of education
- Myroslav Skoryk State Prize of Ukraine
- Oleksandr Dovzhenko State Prize
- State Prizes of the URSR
- State Prize of Ukraine in Science and Technology
- National Prize of Ukraine named after Borys Paton
- Prize of the Cabinet of Ministers of Ukraine for special achievements of youth in the development of Ukraine
- Prize of the Cabinet of Ministers of Ukraine for the development and implementation of innovative technologies
- Prize of the Verkhovna Rada of Ukraine to the most talented young scientists in the field of basic and applied research, and scientific and technological research works

== See also ==
- Honorary titles of Ukraine
