= Oleh Khomenko =

Ukrainian serviceman (born 1972)

- Олег Хоменко
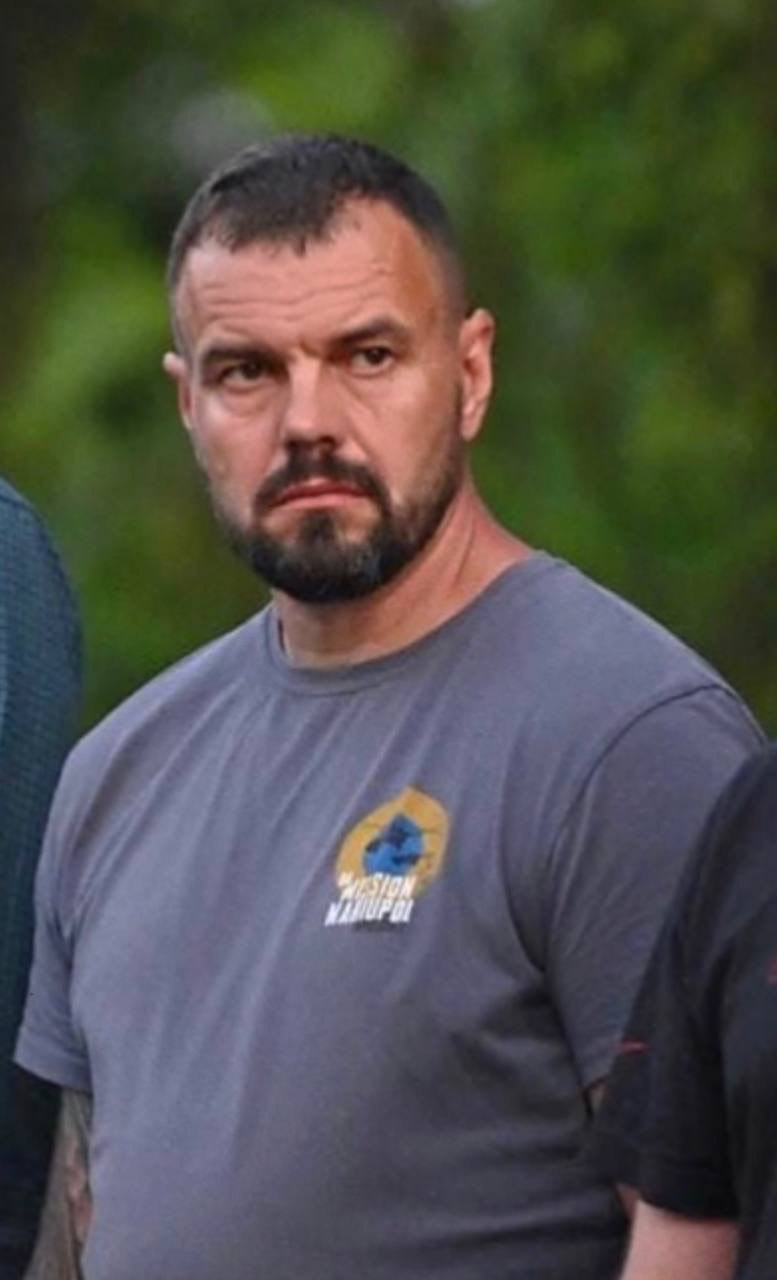

Personal details
- Born: Oleh Serhiiovych Khomenko; 24 October 1972 (age 53)
- Nickname: Апіс (Apis)

Military service
- Allegiance: Ukraine
- Branch/service: National Guard of Ukraine
- Rank: Podpolkovnik
- Battles/wars: Russo-Ukrainian War
- Awards: Hero of Ukraine; Order of Danylo Halytsky; Medal For Military Service to Ukraine

Oleh Serhiiovych Khomenko (Ukrainian: Олег Сергійович Хоменко; born 24 October 1972) was a Ukrainian serviceman, podpolkovnik of the National Guard of Ukraine, defender of Mariupol, participant of the Russian-Ukrainian war. Hero of Ukraine (2022).

== Biography ==
He was born in Krasnyi Luch (now Khrustalnyi)

Participant of the Revolution of Dignity. Later he joined the Azov regiment of the National Guard of Ukraine; participant of the ATO/JFO.

During the full-scale Russian invasion of Ukraine, he was the commander of the commandant's company.

On 21 September 2022, he was released from captivity during a prisoner of war exchange. He was interned in Turkey together with Denys Prokopenko, Sviatoslav Palamar, Serhii Volynskyi and Denys Shleha.

On 8 July 2023, he was returned to the territory of Ukraine.

== Awards ==
- the title "Hero of Ukraine" with the Order of the Golden Star (1 October 2022)
- Order of Danylo Halytsky (28 July 2022)
- Medal For Military Service to Ukraine (13 March 2019)
