= Oleh Shyriaiev =

Ukrainian military officer

Oleh Viktorovych Shyriaiev
- Олег Вікторович Ширяєв
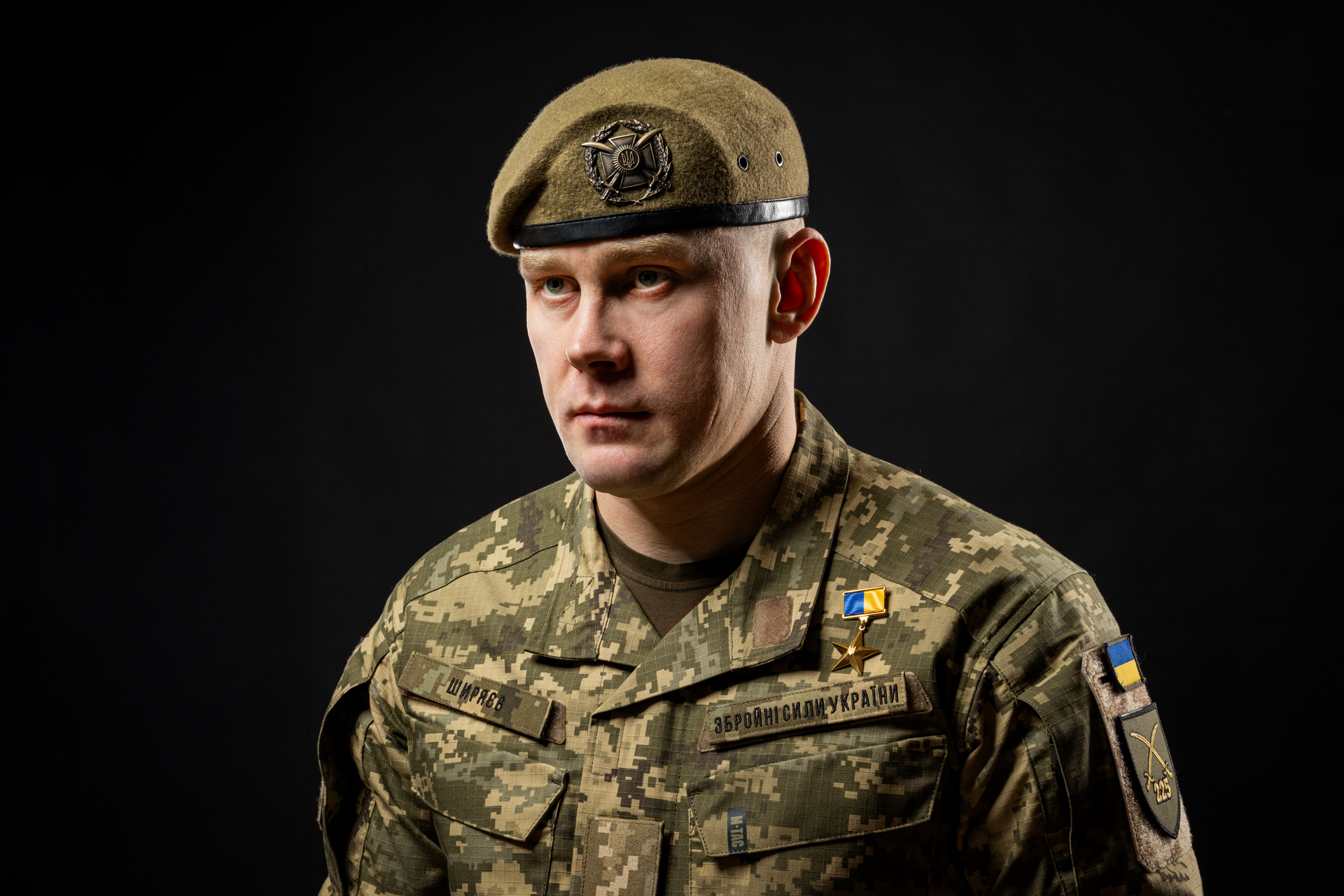
- Oleh Shyriaiev
- Born: 28 September 1986 (age 40); Miscevo Village, Orekhovo-Zuyevsky District, Moscow Oblast, Soviet Union
- Alma mater: Kharkiv National University of Economics; National Guard Military Academy of Ukraine
- Military career
- Allegiance: Ukraine
- Branch: Ukrainian Ground Forces
- Service years: 2014—2015; 2022—present
- Rank: Major
- Units: Eastern Corps (2014–2015); 127th Heavy Mechanized Brigade (2022–2023); 225th Separate Assault Battalion (2023–2025); 225th Separate Assault Regiment (2025–present)
- Conflicts: Russo-Ukrainian War; Battle of Kharkiv (2022); Battle of Bakhmut (2023); Battle of Avdiivka (2023–2024); Battle of Chasiv Yar (2024); Kursk campaign (2024)
- Awards: Order for Courage, 3rd class (2022); Order of Bohdan Khmelnytsky, 3rd class (2023); Order of Danylo Halytsky, 3rd class (2024); Hero of Ukraine (2024)

Oleh Viktorovych Shyriaiev (born 1986) is a Ukrainian military officer, call sign Sirko, who has served as the Commander of the 225th Separate Assault Regiment since 2023. He was awarded the Hero of Ukraine title and Gold Star after taking part in the summer 2024 incursion into Russia's Kursk region.

In addition, he has developed an armoured combat suit to protect troops from drone attacks.

== Early life and education ==
Oleh Viktorovych Shyriaiev was born in 1986 in the settlement of Miscevo, Orekhovo-Zuyevsky District, Soviet Union. After Shyriaiev was born, his family moved to Ukraine. From a young age, Shyriaiev was active in sports and interested in Ukrainian Cossack history and the nationalist movement.

Shyriaiev graduated from Lyubotyn Secondary School No. 4 in Kharkiv Oblast in 1992. He moved to Kharkiv in 2003. He then studied at the Simon Kuznets Kharkiv National University of Economics, where he earned a master's degree, specializing in accounting and audit.

While in school, Shyriaiev trained grappling martial arts. He competed in and won various competitions. He also organizes the “Ida na vy!” martial arts tournament and trains instructors for territorial defense units.

While studying at the university, he worked at the State Savings Bank of Ukraine. Six months later, he went on military service in the Air Force of the Armed Forces of Ukraine, where he received the rank of sergeant.

He later pursued further military education and earned a master's degree as an Operational Level Officer from the National Academy of the National Guard of Ukraine.

Since the mid-2010s, he has been actively involved in volunteering, public activities, charity work, and organizing sports tournaments in Kharkiv and the surrounding region. He is also a participant in the Anti-Terrorist Operation (ATO) near Mariupol, and a co-founder of the Eastern Corps.

== Career ==
After completing his studies, Shyriaiev worked as a banker in Kharkiv from 2007 to 2014 in various positions. During 2008–2009, he completed his compulsory military service in the Ukrainian Air Force as a conscript, serving as a squad commander. He has also been involved in volunteering, public service, and organizing sports events in the Kharkiv region.

He began his career during the separatist uprising in the Donbas in 2014, before the widespread adoption of drones.

From 2014 to 2015, he served in the National Police of Ukraine as the commander of the Eastern Corps based in Kharkiv. In 2015, Shiryaev was deployed twice to Donetsk Oblast in Eastern Ukraine, where the Eastern Corps fought against pro-Russian forces during the Shyrokyne standoff.

From 2018 to 2019, Shyriaiev was a "close associate" of pro-Russian politician Illia Kyva.

During the Russian invasion of Ukraine in March 2022, Shyriaiev initially served as an ordinary rifleman in the 228th battalion of the 127th Separate Brigade of the Territorial Defense Forces. Then he became a company commander and defended Kharkiv. Shyriaiev's company took part in the Slobozhansk counteroffensive in the fall of 2022.

In January 2023, Shyriaiev was appointed, first as commander of the 226th Battalion and in February as commander of the 225th battalion of the 127th Territorial Defense Brigade. In early March, the battalion was transferred to the 56th Separate Motorized Infantry Brigade and moved to the Bakhmut area, where the unit fought against the PMC Wagner. Under his command, the battalion was engaged in the defense near Bakhmut, Donetsk Oblast, and was later integrated into the Ground Forces as the 225th Separate Assault Battalion (SAB) in July 2023. Shyriaiev, call sign Sirko, led his battalion in several strategic operations across different fronts, including battles near Makiivka, Luhansk region, in the Kupiansk–Lyman direction and near Horlivka. Under Shyriaiev's command, the 225th SAB took part in the Battle of Chasiv Yar in 2024. In August 2024, the unit advanced into Kursk Oblast of the Russian Federation and captured major territory. Shyriaiev's 225th regiment was among the first units to have entered Kursk. This was the first ground invasion of Russia by a foreign power since World War II. Shyriaiev developed an armoured combat suit to protect troops from drone attacks led by Russian troops. The suit uses a combination of kevlar and other materials that have the ability to absorb the impact of shrapnel, which has become the main battlefield threat because of the proliferation of drones.

In February 2025, the 225th SAB was reorganized into the 225th Separate Assault Regiment (SAR) of the Ground Forces of the Armed Forces of Ukraine. Shyriaiev was appointed as the regimental commander.

In May 2025, a British drone, StormShroud air system, went into operation to disrupt enemy radar at long range and allow combat jets to attack targets unseen. Ukraine has sent drone instructors to Britain to teach both Ukrainian and British soldiers how to defend against unmanned air vehicles.

=== Kursk operation ===
Since August 6, 2024, the 225th Separate Assault Battalion has been participating in battles in the Kursk region, Russia.

=== Clashes with North Korean soldiers ===
In early February 2025, the first combat clashes between the 225th SAR under the command of Shyriaiev and the North Korean army in the Kursk region took place. According to Shyriaiev in a commentary to CNN, as of the second half of March 2025, the 225th SAR in the Kursk region had a "normal tactical position."

=== Allegations of shooting retreating soldiers ===
On 30 July 2026, Ukrainian investigative outlet Texty reported that they had received a voice message from members of the 225th SAR, in which Shyriaiev allegedly ordered the shooting of retreating troops in a voice message to the unit during the Kursk campaign, stating that "There is only a specific request over the radio: 'permission to move.' Everything else is the enemy. Anything that's moving is the enemy. Anyone fleeing their positions is a deserter — and they're the enemy too. Stick to this rule." In response, Shyriaiev claimed that he was referring to Russian infiltrators disguised as Ukrainian soldiers.

== Awards and recognition ==
Shyriaiev was awarded the Hero of Ukraine title and Gold Star in recognition of his contributions during the Russian invasion of Ukraine. He also received the Order for Courage (3rd class) in 2022, the Order of Bohdan Khmelnytsky (3rd class) in 2023, and the Order of Danylo Halytsky in 2024.

Additionally, he has received the Medal For Military Service to Ukraine, an award from the President of Ukraine. He also received the Jubilee Medal (“25 Years of Ukraine's Independence”) and The Cross of Honor medal of the Ministry of Defense of Ukraine in 2024.
