= Coordination Headquarters for the Treatment of Prisoners of War =

The Coordination Headquarters for the Treatment of Prisoners of War (Координаційний штаб з питань поводження з військовополоненими, Koordynatsiinyi shtab z pytan povodzhennia z viiskovopolonenymy) is a temporary auxiliary body of the Cabinet of Ministers of Ukraine for coordinating the activities of various authorities, law enforcement agencies, and public associations.

The coordination headquarters was formed on March 11, 2022, in accordance with the resolution of the CMU No. 257, which was also approved by the Regulations on the Coordination Headquarters. He coordinates the activities of the treatment of prisoners of war, which are carried out by central and local bodies of executive power, other state bodies, local self-government bodies, military formations formed in accordance with laws, law enforcement bodies and public associations.

== Heads of the Coordination Headquarters ==
- from March 11, 2022 — Iryna Vereshchuk, Minister of Reintegration of Temporarily Occupied Territories
- from May 31, 2022 - Kyrylo Budanov, head of the Main Intelligence Directorate of the Ministry of Defense of Ukraine

== Composition of the Coordination Headquarters ==
The staff of the Coordination Headquarters is approved by the Cabinet of Ministers of Ukraine. The head of the Coordination Staff is the head of the Main Directorate of Intelligence of the Ministry of Defense of Ukraine (until May 28, the Minister of Reintegration of the Temporarily Occupied Territories).

The KS included representatives of the Ministry of Defense of Ukraine, the Ministry of Defense of Ukraine, the SBU, the Ministry of Reintegration, the Ministry of Justice, the Ministry of Economy, the Ministry of Internal Affairs, the Ministry of Foreign Affairs, the Ministry of Health, the National Police, the State Border Service of Ukraine, the National Guard of Ukraine, the Armed Forces of Ukraine, the National Security and Defense Council of Ukraine.

In particular, the head of the Working Group of the Coordination Headquarters is Andrii Yusov, the deputy is Bohdan Okhrimenko.

== Activities of the coordination headquarters ==
Resolution No. 633 of the Cabinet of Ministers of Ukraine dated May 28, 2022 amended the Regulations on the Coordination Headquarters for the Treatment of Prisoners of War, according to which the head and secretary of the Headquarters are the Chief and the representative of the Main Intelligence Directorate of the Ministry of Defense, respectively.

On July 7, 2022, the KSHPPV published a road map of the actions of relatives, if any of the relatives, who is enrolled in the ranks of the Armed Forces of Ukraine, law enforcement agencies, went missing, was captured or died.

On November 15, 2022, the International Committee of the Red Cross confirmed the arrangements to ensure communication and correspondence between prisoners of war and their families, guaranteed by Article 71 of the Geneva Convention on the Treatment of Prisoners of War. The National Information Bureau has developed rules for writing correspondence for prisoners of war. As of November 15, almost 2,000 letters from prisoners of war were sent to Ukraine.

From November 28, 2022, it became possible to receive information in the Ukrainian language from the UN Working Group on Enforced or Involuntary Disappearances.

=== Regional consultation centers ===
On November 12, 2022, the opening of the first regional representative office of the Coordination Headquarters — the Consultation Center of the Southern Region ( Mykolaiv ) took place, whose specialists were trained at the Public Reception Hall at the Coordination Headquarters in Kyiv. On December 8, 2022, the Central Region Consultation Center ( Vinnytsia ) was opened, on December 23, 2022 — the Eastern Region Consultation Center ( Kharkiv ).

Addresses of Consulting Centers:

- of the Southern region — Mykolaiv, str. Nikolska, 37;
- of the Central region — Vinnytsia, str. Teatralna, 15;
- of the Eastern region — Kharkiv, str. Kosmichna, 21.

=== Work with families of military personnel ===
As part of the Headquarters, there is a consultation line for legal, social and psychological support of the families of Ukrainian Defenders who were captured or missing. On December 28, 2022, new numbers of the consultation line were opened, which, unlike regular GSM lines, can receive calls in the event of a blackout — calls to the line will be received via the Internet using two channels, including a backup via Starlink.

The coordination headquarters holds regular meetings (including online conferences) with relatives and loved ones of Ukrainian servicemen who were captured, went missing or died. The meetings are attended by representatives of the office of the Commissioner for Missing Persons under Special Circumstances, the Commissioner for Human Rights, the Ministry of Defense of Ukraine, the Ministry of Internal Affairs, the Armed Forces of Ukraine, other law enforcement and law enforcement structures, legal, legal, charitable organizations, etc.

On October 26, 2022, KSHPPV organized the participation of a Ukrainian delegation of representatives of public organizations of defenders who were captured by Russia, disappeared under special circumstances or died, in the events of the 43rd session of the Congress of Local and Regional Authorities of Europe under the auspices of the Council of Europe in Strasbourg.

== Exchanges of prisoners of war ==
During the period from February 24 to November 3, 2022, 1,138 Ukrainians were released from Russian captivity, among whom four were considered dead. Representatives of the Armed Forces note that for at least 14 days, those released from captivity undergo reintegration measures, which include medical and psychological assistance, restoration of documents, etc. During the period from February 24 to December 31, 2022, 1,596 people (military and civilians), including 187 women, were released. On December 31, 2022, the 35th exchange of prisoners took place, prepared by the Coordination Headquarters since the beginning of the large-scale invasion. Among those released on December 31 are two twin brothers who were captured in Luhansk region; a sergeant whose 12-year-old son wrote a letter to the President of Ukraine to help release his father, as well as a father and son who went to serve in the ranks of the territorial defense together; in addition, a returned pit bull terrier from "Azovstal", previously exported to Russia.

On September 2, 2022, another exchange took place within the framework of the work of the Coordination Headquarters in the Donetsk region, as a result of which 14 Ukrainian defenders who were captured in the spring of 2022 were returned: 10 servicemen of the 58th Army Corps and four of the 30th Army Corps; among the freed are one officer and one military medic.

On September 21, 2022, an exchange of prisoners of war took place with the participation of the Coordination Headquarters. The Russians handed over 215 Ukrainians, including 124 officers and 89 privates and non-commissioned officers of the Armed Forces of Ukraine, NSU, DPSU, NPU, SBU, DMSU and DSST of the Ministry of Internal Affairs, as well as two civilians. In particular, well-known unit commanders were released: Serhiy Volynskyi, Sviatoslav Palamar, Denys Prokopenko, Yevhenii Bova, Lev Pashko, Denys Shleha, Oleh Khomenko, the author of photos from "Azovstal" Dmytro Kozatskyi, paramedic Kateryna Polishchuk and others. The full list of those released from captivity is posted on the website of the Coordination Headquarters.

On October 11, 2022, Ukraine returned 32 Ukrainian defenders: three officers, 28 soldiers, one sailor. The age of those released from captivity is 22–51 years. In addition, the enemy returned the body of the fallen soldier Dmytro Fialka, a citizen of Israel.

On October 13, 2022, after the exchange of prisoners of war, 20 soldiers returned to Ukraine: one representative of the National Guard of Ukraine and 19 servicemen of the Armed Forces of Ukraine, including four from the Armed Forces of Ukraine and one from the Navy). Among those released is one officer, aged 19–49. The released are serving, in particular, in the patrol battalion of the ZAES, the 808th pontoon-bridge regiment, the 503rd separate battalion of marines, the 56th separate motorized infantry brigade, the 24th, 53rd, 65th and 92nd separate mechanized brigades, the 46th separate amphibious assault brigade, in the Forces of the TrO.

On October 18, 2022, as part of the work of the Coordination Headquarters, 108 Ukrainian women aged 21–62 years old returned from captivity, including 79 servicemen of the Armed Forces of Ukraine, one each from NSU, DPSU, DSST of the MoU . Among the released women, 37 were previously evacuated from Azovstal.

On October 26, 2022, 10 military personnel were returned from captivity, including servicemen of the 60th, 57th, 28th brigades and other military units. The age of those released is 21–55 years, one of them is an officer. The body of the American volunteer Joshua Alan Jones from the International Legion, who died on August 23, 2022, in Donetsk region, was also handed over.

On October 29, 2022, 52 Ukrainian prisoners of war were returned. Among them, 30 servicemen of the Armed Forces (in particular, 9 — from the Forces of the Russian Federation and 18 — from the Navy ), 12 — NSU (in particular, 2 — from the special purpose unit "Azov" ), 8 — DPSU. Two are civilians. Those released, aged 19–56, were captured in Donetsk Region (including Mariupol), Kharkiv Region, Buch, Kyiv Region, Zmiiny Island, and the Chernobyl Nuclear Power Plant.

On November 3, 2022, Ukraine returned 107 servicemen from Russian captivity, including 6 officers, 74 defenders of Azovstal. Age — 19–54 years old, representatives: Armed Forces — 54 (of which 21 — Navy, 13 — Forces of TrO ), 33 — NSU, 18 — DPSU, 1 — NPU, 1 — DSST MOU.

On November 11, 2022, 45 soldiers and sergeants were released from captivity and the bodies of the two dead were returned. Among the 22-56-year-old servicemen are representatives of 58 ompbr, 53 ombre, 30 ombre, 93 ombre, 10 ogshbr, 43 oabr, 10 ompb "Polyssia", 1 obrspp named after Ivan Bohun . KSHPPV reported that mainly marksmen, combat medics, drivers and paramedics are returning.

On November 23, 2022, 36 servicemen aged 19–56 were released from captivity, including 20 defenders of Mariupol (including nine evacuees from "Azovstal"), as well as 15 prisoners from the Zaporizhzhya NPP. Units: 28 OMBr, Donetsk border detachment, 1 OBMP, 23 OBrOGP, 36 OBrMP, Kerch marine guard unit, 12 BrOP, 9 POP, Border Service Training Center, 25 OBrOGP.

On November 24, 2022, 50 servicemen aged 19–44 were freed from captivity, including two officers: 20 representatives of the NSU (of which 15 were captured at the Chernobyl nuclear power plant), 24 — Armed Forces (of which 12 — Navy, 2 — TrO), 6 — DPSU . Units: 79 ODSHBr, 1 OBMP, 1 OBOOVDO, Izmail border detachment, 95 ODSHBr, 55 OABr, 18 OB, 13 ODSHB, 132 ORB, Donetsk border detachment, Luhansk border detachment, 16 OBrAA, 35 OBrMP, 9 POP, 36 OBrMP, 88 OBMP, 23 OBrOGP, 109 OBrTrO, 12 BrOP, Military Hospital of the Military Medical Clinical Center of the Eastern Region, 503 OBMP.

On November 26, 2022, 12 Ukrainians were released from captivity - 9 military personnel and 3 civilians, aged from 27 to 47 years. Among those released are two officers, defenders of Zmiiny Island, defenders of Mariupol and "Azovstal", captured at the Chernobyl nuclear power plant, in Donetsk region and Mykolaiv region. Units: Donetsk border detachment, 1st OBOOVDO, 35th OBrMP, 2nd OSBTrO, 1st OBMP, 36th OBrMP.

On December 1, 2022, 50 servicemen aged 19–59 were released from captivity, including 4 officers, 14 defenders of Mariupol, including 8 defenders of "Azovstal", some of the rescued - with amputated limbs or unable to move. Units: separate presidential brigade, 36 OBrMP, 12 BrOP, 72 OMBr, 114 OBTrO, 59 OMpBr, 28 OMbr, 79 ODSHBr, 56 OMpBr, 37 OMpB, 107 OYurTrO, 115 OMBr, 66 OMBr, 66 OMBr, 21 OBr OPDP.

On December 6, 2022 (the Day of the Armed Forces of Ukraine), 60 servicemen aged 21–58 were returned from captivity, almost all of them were wounded. Among those released: 15 officers, two women (a military medic and a representative of the Navy), 34 defenders of Mariupol, including 14 evacuees from "Azovstal"; 52 soldiers are representatives of the Armed Forces (of which 18 are from the Navy), 6 are from the DPSU, and 2 are from the NSU.

On December 14, 2022, 65 people aged 19 to 57 were released from Russian captivity, most of whom were captured by the enemy near Bakhmut, Soledar, Zaytsevo and other places in Donetsk and Luhansk regions. Among those released: 64 representatives of the Armed Forces (of which 5 are members of the Security Council) and 35-year-old US citizen Suedi Murekez, a native of Africa, who was captured by the occupiers at the beginning of summer for participating in rallies in Kherson. Among the freed servicemen were four officers, at least 23 soldiers returned with injuries.

On December 31, 2022, 140 Ukrainian soldiers were released from captivity - 118 privates and sergeants and 22 officers captured in the Donetsk, Luhansk, Kharkiv areas and in the Kyiv region, two defenders of Fr. Zmiiny, one — Zaporizhzhya NPP. Among the dismissed: 106 representatives of the Armed Forces (of which 15 — the Ministry of Defense, 11 — the Navy), 22 — NSU, 10 — DPSU; eight women; 44 defenders of Mariupol.

On January 8, 2023, the 36th exchange of prisoners of war took place: 50 servicemen of the Armed Forces of the Ukrainian Armed Forces, the Ukrainian Armed Forces, and the Ukrainian Armed Forces, including 33 officers, were returned to Ukraine.

== Return of bodies of fallen servicemen ==
On October 11, 2022, the bodies of 62 fallen soldiers were returned, including soldiers who died in Olenivka and Israeli citizen Dmytro Fialka, coach of the Lviv children's football team, who died on September 1 near Bakhmut.

On October 26, 2022, the body of the American volunteer Joshua Alan Jones from the International Legion, who died on August 23, 2022, in Donetsk region, was handed over.

On November 8, 2022, the bodies of 38 dead Ukrainian soldiers were returned to their families.
