= Mykola Mykolenko =

Ukrainian general (born 1967)

Mykola Oleksiiovych Mykolenko
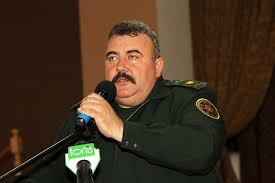
- Native name: Микола Олексійович Миколенко
- Born: 19 May 1967 (age 58); Kyiv Oblast, Ukrainian SSR, Soviet Union
- Allegiance: Ukraine
- Branch: Internal Troops of Ukraine; National Guard of Ukraine
- Service years: 1990–present
- Rank: Lieutenant general

Mykola Oleksiiovych Mykolenko (Ukrainian: Микола Олексійович Миколенко; born 19 May 1967) is a Ukrainian military officer, lieutenant general, deputy commander of the National Guard of Ukraine (since 26 June 2019). Knight of the Order of Bohdan Khmelnytsky III Class.

== Biography ==
Mykola Mykolenko was born in Kyiv region. In 1990, he graduated from the Simferopol Higher Military-Political Construction School. In 2002, he graduated from the Kyiv Institute of Internal Affairs and in the same year headed the capital police brigade, which he commanded until 2010. In 2008, he graduated from the Academy of Management of the Ministry of Internal Affairs of Ukraine.

In 2010, he was appointed to the position of the head of the Northern TrK Department of the Internal Affairs Ministry of Ukraine, which in the spring of 2014 became a structural unit of the National Guard.

In 2011, Mykolenko was promoted to the rank of major general.

On 26 June 2019 he was appointed to the position of Deputy Commander of the National Guard (from service).

== Decree of the President of Ukraine No. 784/2023 ==
About the dismissal of M. Mykolenko from the post of deputy commander of the National Guard of Ukraine.

== Awards ==
- Order of Bohdan Khmelnytsky III Class (20 March 2008) – for a significant personal contribution to strengthening law and order, exemplary performance of military and official duty in the protection of constitutional rights and freedoms of citizens and on the occasion of the Day of Internal Troops of the Ministry of Internal Affairs of Ukraine.
- Medal "For Military Service to Ukraine" (25 March 2005) – for a significant personal contribution to the strengthening of law and order, exemplary performance of military and official duty and on the occasion of the Day of Internal Troops of the Ministry of Internal Affairs of Ukraine.
