= Yurii Bulavka =

Ukrainian pilot

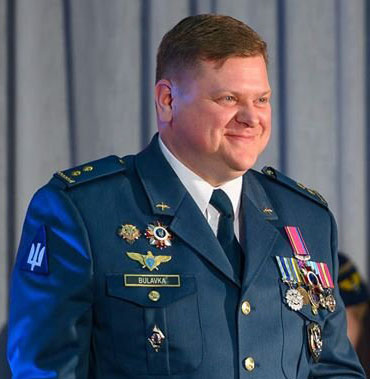
- Native name: Юрій Булавка
- Birth name: Yurii Volodymyrovych Bulavka
- Allegiance: Ukraine
- Service / branch: Ukrainian Air Force
- Rank: Colonel
- Battles / wars: Russo-Ukrainian War
- Awards: Medal For Military Service to Ukraine

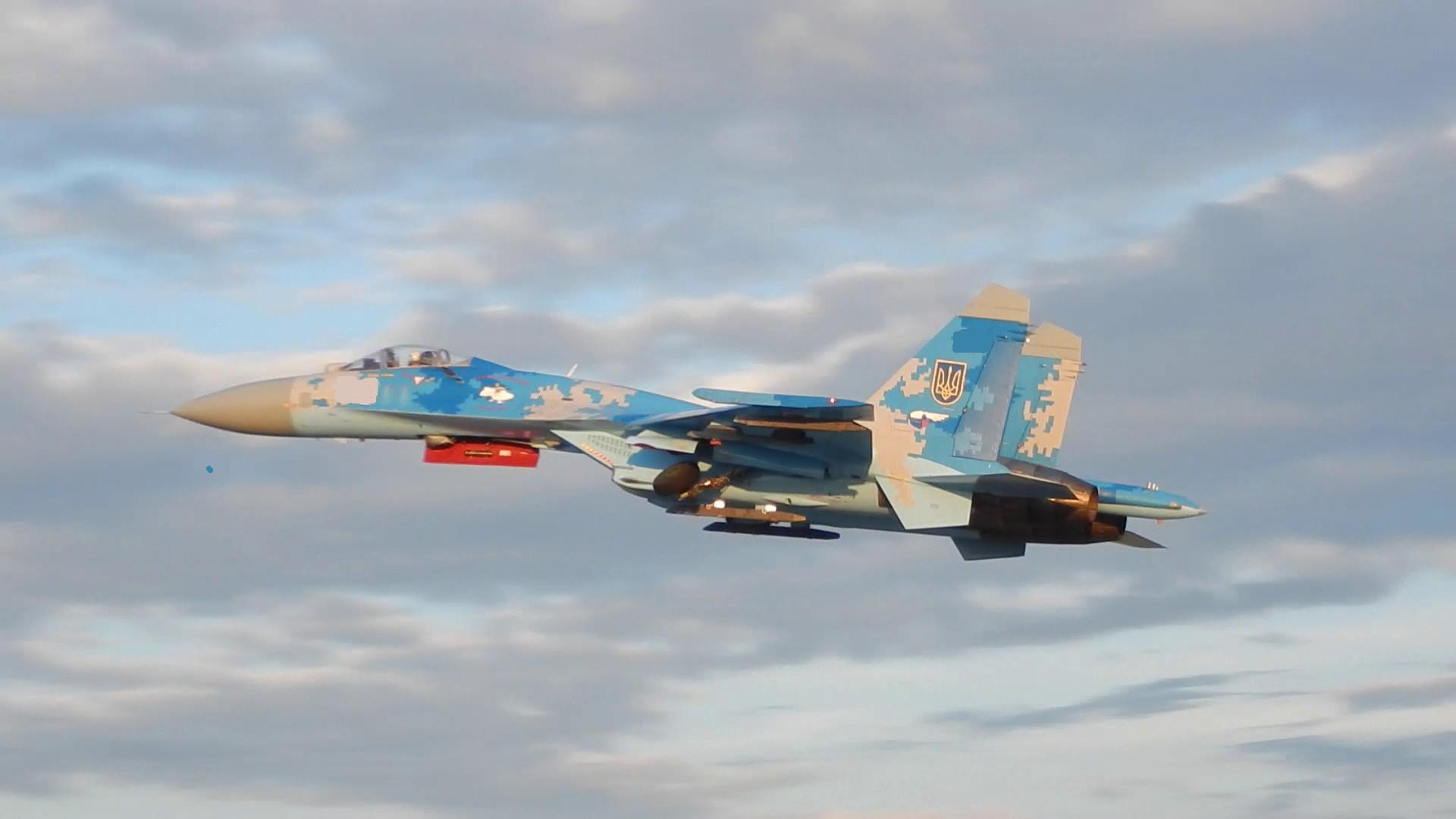
The 831st Tactical Aviation Brigade completed scheduled flight shifts on combat and training Su-27 fighter aircraft, as well as on L-39 training aircraft. Lieutenant Colonel Yurii Bulavka, the second pilot to represent Ukraine at international aviation shows in 2018, together with his instructor Colonel Oleksandr Oksanchenko.

Yurii Volodymyrovych Bulavka (Ukrainian: Юрій Володимирович Булавка) is a Ukrainian military pilot 1st class, colonel of the Air Force of the Armed Forces of Ukraine. He is a student of multiple winner of air shows in Europe, Colonel Oleksandr Oksanchenko.

== Biography ==
He served as a deputy brigade commander in the 831st Tactical Aviation Brigade. In 2020, he started serving in the Ukrainian Air Force Command in Vinnytsia.

In 2019, he took part in the air show "Gdynia Aerobaltic – 2019" (Gdynia, Poland). In a 15-minute show, he demonstrated aerobatics to the European community, impressed with his maneuverability and high training.

In April 2022, he called on the United States to provide Ukrainian defenders with F-16, F-15, and F-18 fighters amid Russia's military aggression.

== Awards and honors ==
- Medal For Military Service to Ukraine (10 October 2019)
- Best in aerobatics at the international air show "Gdynia Aerobatic 2019" (2019; Cumulus special prize; Gdynia, Poland)
- Winner of the Paul Bowen trophy for best individual jet demonstration at RIAT 2019 in United Kingdom.
