= Christine Nyatanyi =

Rwandan economist and politician (1965–2011)

- Born: 16 July 1965; Rwanda
- Died: 26 September 2011 (aged 46); Saint-Luc University Hospital, Brussels, Belgium
- Citizenship: Rwanda
- Education: Kharkiv National University of Economics (Bachelor of Economics); Odessa Institute of National Economy (Masters in Industrial Planning)
- Occupations: Economist, politician
- Years active: 1991–2011
- Title: Former Minister of State for Community Development and Social Affairs in the Rwanda Ministry of Local Government

Christine Nyatanyi (16 July 1965 – 26 September 2011) was a Rwandan economist and politician, who served as the Minister of State responsible for social affairs in the Ministry of Local Government, from October 2003 until her death in September 2011.

== Background and education ==
She was born in Rwanda on 16 July 1965. She attended the Kharkiv National University of Economics, in Kharkiv, Ukraine, where she graduated with a Bachelor of Economics degree in 1987. She then studied at the Odessa Institute of National Economy, graduating in 1991 with a Masters in industrial planning.

== Career ==
Following the 1994 Rwanda genocide, Nantanyi worked with the International Committee of the Red Cross, in the tracing department in Goma, Democratic Republic of the Congo and in Nairobi, Kenya. In 1997, she was appointed as a project officer in the Flemish Council for Refugees, based in Brussels, Belgium. In October 2003, she was appointed state minister responsible for social affairs in the Rwanda Ministry of Local Government, serving in that capacity until September 2011.

== Death ==
Nyatanyi died on 26 September 2011, at Saint-Luc University Hospital, in Brussels, Belgium, following long treatment. Her body was flown back to Kigali, aboard Brussels Airlines on Saturday, 1 October 2011. After a period of lying in state in parliament, and a requiem mass at Regina Pacis Catholic Church in Remera, a suburb of Kigali, her body was afforded a state funeral. She was interred at Rusororo Cemetery in Kabuga, on Monday, 3 October 2011.

== Other considerations ==
The United Nations bestowed an award upon Christine Nyatanyi, in 2008, in recognition of her public service and her accountability in the Rwanda national program Ubudehe’.

== See also ==
- Alvera Mukabaramba
