= Dmytro Todorov =

Ukrainian military personnel (born 1997)

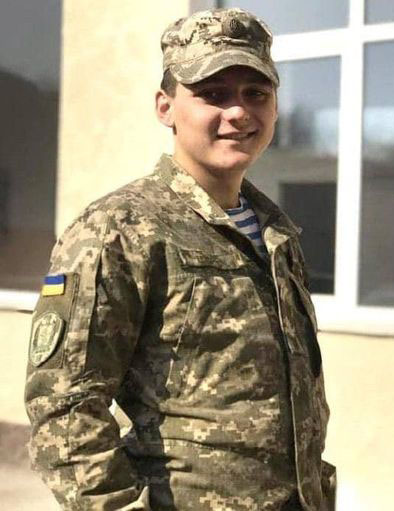
- Native name: Дмитро Русланович Тодоров
- Born: October 7, 1997 (age 28) Suvorovske, Vinnytsia Oblast, Ukraine
- Conflicts: Russian-Ukrainian War
- Awards: Hero of Ukraine

Dmytro Ruslanovych Todorov (Ukrainian: Дмитро Русланович Тодоров; born October 7, 1997) is a senior lieutenant and participant of the Russian-Ukrainian war. He is a Hero of Ukraine.

== Biography ==
He was born in Suvorovske, Vinnytsia Oblast.

From 2015 to 2019, he studied at the faculty of training airborne troops at the Odesa Military Academy. Immediately after graduation, in the rank of lieutenant, he was sent to the east of Ukraine, where he became the commander of a platoon. In 2019, he participated in combat operations in the area of the town of Stanytsia Luhanska, in 2020 he defended the outskirts of the town of Shchastia, and then the outskirts of the town of Avdiivka.

Since August 2, 2021, he has been in the area of the Joint Forces Operation (JFO) in Donbas. In March–April 2022, the units where Todorov served were carrying out combat missions in Donetsk Oblast. During the fighting, the enemy's equipment and personnel were destroyed. Ukrainian defenders also successfully evacuated their wounded comrades.

On May 2, 2022, in his daily address, the President of Ukraine, Volodymyr Zelenskyy announced that Dmytro Todorov was awarded the title of Hero of Ukraine for personal courage and extraordinary effectiveness in battles against the occupiers in Donetsk Oblast.

== Awards ==
- Hero of Ukraine with the award of the Order of the Gold Star. (May 2, 2022) – for personal courage and heroism shown in the defense of the state sovereignty and territorial integrity of Ukraine
- Medal For Military Service to Ukraine (April 15, 2022) – for personal courage and dedicated actions shown in the defense of the state sovereignty and territorial integrity of Ukraine, fidelity to the military oath.
