= Ukrainian Academy =

Ukrainian Academy or Academy of Ukraine an refer to:

- National Academy of Arts of Ukraine
- National Law Academy of Ukraine
- National Academy of Sciences of Ukraine
- National Guard Military Academy of Ukraine
- National Metallurgical Academy of Ukraine
- Ukrainian Academy of Banking of the National Bank of Ukraine
- Ukrainian Academy of Printing
- Ukrainian Engineering Pedagogics Academy
- Ukrainian Film Academy
- Ukrainian National Academy of Music
