= Evsei Liberman =

Soviet economist (1897–1981)

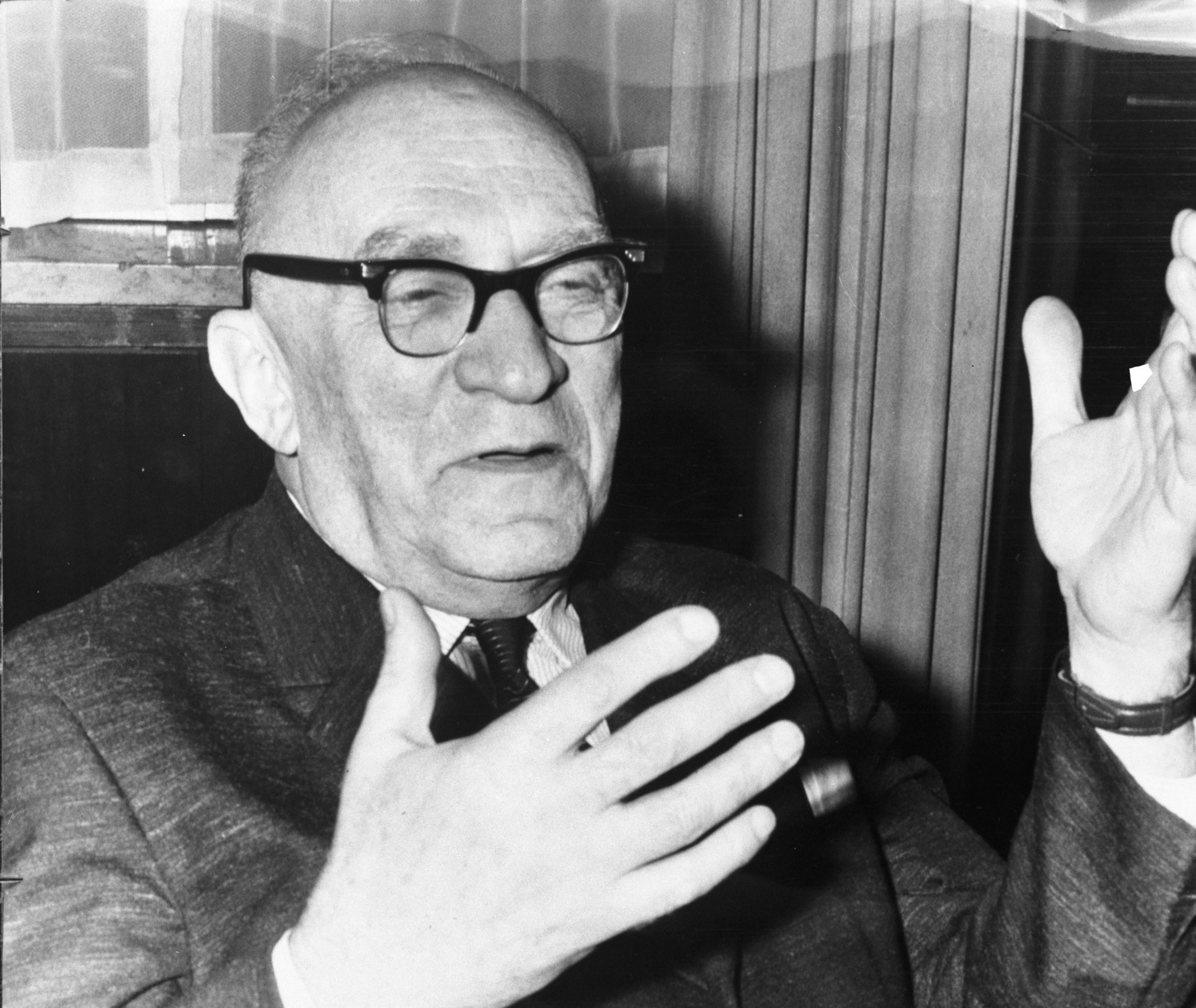
Liberman in 1967

Evsei Grigorievich Liberman (Russian: Евсей Григорьевич Либерман, pronounced [jɪfˈsʲej ɡrʲɪˈɡorʲjɪvʲɪtɕ lʲɪbʲɪrˈman], Ukrainian: Овсій Григорович Ліберман; 2 October 1897, – 11 November 1981) was a Soviet economist who lived in Kharkov, Ukrainian SSR. He is noted as the architect of the Soviet economic reform of 1965, also known as "Libermanism".

== Biography ==
Liberman was born in Slavuta, Russian Empire, in a wealthy Jewish family. He was a graduate of Kiev University, Faculty of Law in 1920 and Kharkiv Institute of Engineering and Economics, Machine-Building Faculty in 1933. During 1920s he worked as a researcher at the Kharkiv Institute of Labor. He taught at the Kharkiv Institute of National Economy in 1920s, Kharkiv Engineering and Economic Institute in 1930s-1950-s, the Kharkiv V.I. Lenin Polytechnic Institute, and the University of Kharkiv.

He proposed new methods of economic planning based on the principles of new democratic centralism. His dissertation took form in Plan, pribyl', premiya (Plan, profit, bonus) article published in Pravda (1962). This became a basis for the Soviet reforms of 1965.

His most notable works were "Structure of the balance of an industrial company" (1948), "Means to raise the profitability of the socialist companies" (1956), "Analysis of the use of resources" (1963), "Plan and benefits for the Soviet economy" (1965) and "Planning of the socialism" (1967).

Reforms inspired by Liberman unsuccessfully attempted to revitalize the Soviet economy during the 1960s. Liberman's reform proposals were also implemented in East Germany.

Liberman's wife, Regina Horowitz, pianist and pedagogue, was a sister of the famed pianist Vladimir Horowitz. His great-granddaughter, Génia, is also a virtuoso concert pianist. In 1981, he died in Kharkiv.

== Bibliography ==
- Liberman, E.G. (1932). Normative Accounting in Production [Normativnyy uchet v proizvodstve] (in Russian). Moscow: Soyuzorguchet. p. 16.
- Liberman, E.G. (1950). Intra-Factory Cost Accounting [Vnutrizavodskiy khozraschet] (in Russian). Moscow: Izd-vo and 1-ya tip. Mashgiza v L. p. 48.
- Liberman, E.G., ed. (1960). Organization and Planning of Machine-Building Enterprises [Organizatsiya i planirovanie mashinostroitel'nykh predpriyatiy] (in Russian). Moscow: Mashgiz. p. 567.
- Liberman, E.G. (1970). Economic Methods of Improving the Efficiency of Public Production [Ekonomicheskie metody povysheniya effektivnosti obshchestvennogo proizvodstva] (in Russian). Moscow: Ekonomika. p. 175.

== See also ==
- Kharkiv Institute of Labor
- Kharkiv National University of Economics
