= Sviatoslav Palamar =

Ukrainian military commander (born 1982)

- Святослав Паламар
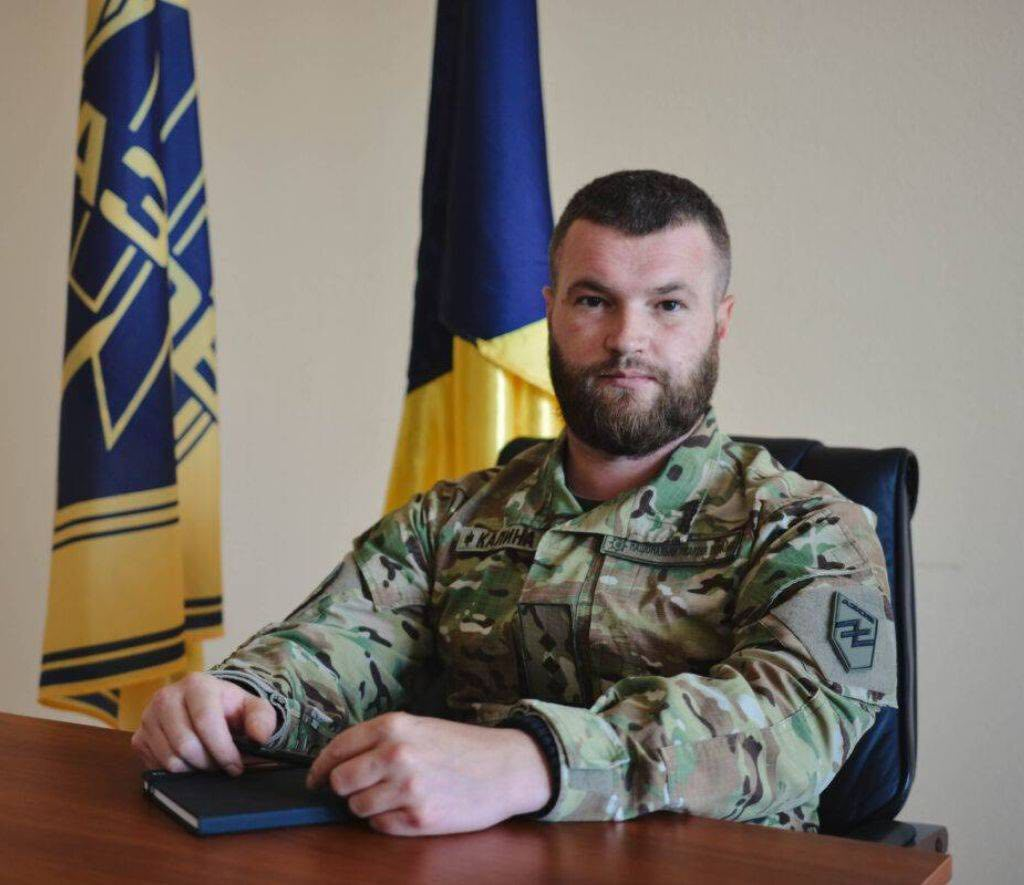

Personal details
- Born: Sviatoslav Yaroslavovych Palamar; 10 October 1982 (age 43) Mykolaiv, Lviv Oblast, Soviet Union (now Ukraine)
- Awards: Hero of Ukraine; Order of Danylo Halytsky
- Nickname: Калина (Kalyna)

Military service
- Branch/service: Ministry of Internal Affairs; National Guard
- Years of service: 2014 – present
- Rank: Captain
- Commands: Azov Brigade
- Battles/wars: Russo-Ukrainian War; War in Donbas; Russian invasion of Ukraine; Eastern Ukraine offensive; Siege of Mariupol

Sviatoslav Yaroslavovych Palamar ('Kalyna') is a captain and the current deputy commander of the Azov regiment within the National Guard of Ukraine. During the 2022 Russian invasion of Ukraine, Palamar was involved in fighting Russian forces during the siege of Mariupol, within the Azovstal steelworks.

== Early life ==
Sviatoslav Palamar was born on October 10, 1982, in Mykolaiv, a town near Lviv, where he lived until he was a student. He studied at the Lviv University of Trade and Economics. He describes himself as Galician. Prior to the war he worked as a commercial director in a company.

In 2000, Palamar joined the Patriot of Ukraine nationalist group. At the time, the organisation was known for far-right views. One of the group's leaders, Andriy Biletsky, would later be involved in founding the Azov Battalion (as it was then known). However, in a later interview in 2022, Palamar would deny that members of the regiment wore swastikas or other Nazi insignia, and emphasised the status of Azov as a military unit.

Prior to the onset of war in eastern Ukraine, Palamar participated in the Orange Revolution and the Revolution of Dignity. He has a wife and a child.

== Military service ==
Palamar previously served in the Donbas war which began in 2014. In an interview with pro-Azov military journalist Oleksiy Suvorov, he stated that he had adopted his call sign because the guelder rose or 'Kalyna' in Ukrainian is a traditional symbol associated with Ukraine.

Following the 2022 Russian invasion of Ukraine, he was involved in fighting in Mariupol and was one of the commanders of a group of soldiers which retreated to the Azovstal steelworks. These soldiers included the Azov regiment and Ukrainian marines.

During the siege of Mariupol, Captain Palamar took part in several press conferences and interviews with the media on behalf of the Azov Battalion and the soldiers trapped in the steelworks, which included Marines and National Guardsmen, alongside Denys Prokopenko and other fighters.

On 12 May 2022, he gave an interview to Haaretz, an Israeli newspaper. In this interview he likened the military history of and attacks on Ukraine to that in Israel. He claimed that he had received no order to leave and that he was unwilling to leave dead and injured fellow soldiers behind, explaining the decision to remain in the steelworks. After the Ukrainian surrender in Azovstal, Russian forces said they captured Palamar among other commanders.

On 21 September 2022, as part of a prisoner-of-war exchange, Palamar was released from Russian captivity. Under the terms of the deal, it was agreed that he, along with four other officers released in the exchange, would remain in Turkey until the end of the war.

On 8 July 2023, Ukrainian President Volodymyr Zelenskyy announced that Azov commanders had been brought back to Ukraine from Turkey, posting a video of five Azov commanders boarding his plane, including Palamar.

=== Awards ===
As a result of his military service during this war, he was awarded a number of medals including the Order of Danylo Halytsky, the Medal For Military Service to Ukraine, the Breastplate for Valiant Service and the Breastplate for the Defence of Mariupol.

On 1 October 2022 he was awarded the title of Hero of Ukraine by President of Ukraine.
