= Kharkiv Institute of Labor =

Soviet-Ukrainian research institute

Kharkiv Institute of Labor (All-Ukrainian Institute of Labor) (Kharkivskyi instytut truda, Vseukrainskyi instytut truda) — was a research center based in Kharkiv from 1921 to 1930. The institute conducted pioneering research in the areas of intellect psychology, the application of mathematical-statistical methods, and computing machines for processing statistical information. It also delved into the organization of industrial and agricultural production, optimization of work and management processes in both commercial and governmental organizations. In addition to scientific research, the institute provided consultancy and developed projects for trade, industrial and cooperative enterprises, as well as public organizations and institutions. It was one of the leading centers of the movement for scientific organization of labor (NOT) in the early Soviet Union.

== History ==
The Kharkiv Institute of Labor was established in 1921 by the decree of the Council of People's Commissars of the Ukrainian SSR, "On the Establishment of the Institute for the Scientific Study of Labor". It was initiated by a small circle of enthusiasts, with F.R. Dunaevsky, M.Y. Syrkin, and A.Y. Lapin playing leading roles. During the 1920s, Soviet press and publications regarded the institute as one of the centers of the Scientific Organization of Labor (Nauchnaya organizatsiya truda - NOT) movement. The institute's founders were inspired by the ideas of refining the organization of people's labor and increasing economic productivity "10 times compared to pre-war levels and 30 times compared to the current status". The institute was envisioned as an organizational platform to attract "scientific forces" and provide a conducive environment for interested specialists to carry out productive research.

Initially, the institute functioned as a public initiative and was funded by the South Bureau of the All-Union Central Council of Trade Unions. It was located in a building at 3, Hospital Lane. The initial allocations allowed the institute to acquire a vast amount of the latest foreign literature, leading to the creation of a large library with publications on production and management organization, modern mathematical-statistical methods, labor psychology, and the theory of intelligence. By 1924, the institute's library housed 6,718 publications and had established a scientific card catalog.

In 1922, the institute's activities experienced a brief hiatus due to its transfer to the jurisdiction of the People's Commissariat of Education (Narkompros) of the USSR and a shortage of funding.

In 1923, the institute held a competition to fill vacancies for research scientists. Both standard intelligence tests and the institute's own developments for assessing the creative abilities of the candidates were employed. Among the ten contestants who were hired, Evsei Liberman stood out.

By 1924, the institute secured funding to acquire modern equipment, specifically the tabulating "Powers" machines. A computational station was established and equipped to serve the institute's laboratories. This enabled the processing of extensive statistical data, including the results from mass IQ tests, and primary data from industrial and financial institution surveys.

In the mid-1920s, the institute proposed several projects aimed at reforming public education in Ukraine, restructuring tax accounting, establishing efficient agricultural enterprises based on tractor technology, and organizing industrial enterprises using innovative forms of production accounting. These proposals did not receive support from Soviet organizations. Some were deemed politically unacceptable, while others faced resistance from groups vested in the status quo or were misunderstood by leadership entrenched in traditional working methods. Despite extended efforts, including seeking the support of the People's Commissariat of the Workers' and Peasants' Inspectorate (NK RKI), the institute's endeavors mostly ended in stalemate. The institute's key proposals remained unimplemented.

Researchers at the institute made a series of insightful theoretical generalizations regarding management challenges. Their studies in the field of intelligence psychology were pioneering for Soviet psychological science. Additionally, the institute was at the forefront in the USSR in its extensive use of mechanical tabulating machines for processing large-scale statistical data and employing contemporary methods of correlation-regression analysis at the time. The approaches proposed by the institute, in several instances, served as a comprehensive alternative to Soviet policies in the areas of education, agricultural collectivization, and industrial industrialization.

In 1930, amid the crackdown on the NOT movement, Soviet authorities restructured the institute. It was transformed into the All-Ukrainian Institute for Management Rationalization, and a portion of the institute was integrated into the Institute of Pathology and Labor Hygiene. The institute's leadership was replaced, and key personnel left the newly formed entities.

== Structure ==
Throughout its existence, the institute maintained principles of self-management. It was overseen by a presidium headed by F.R. Dunaevsky during the institute's entire tenure. The institute's infrastructure included a library, a scientific card index, a tabulating station, a psychodynamics laboratory (led by M.Y. Syrkin), and an organizational analysis laboratory (headed by Evsei Liberman). Departmental sections were established based on research directions.

== Research Activities ==
=== Investigation of Working Conditions in Kharkiv's Industrial Enterprises ===
In 1921, a program to investigate the working conditions and productivity of industrial enterprises in Kharkiv was developed in collaboration with the Southern Bureau of the AUCCTU, with which the institute cooperated at the time. The institute endeavored to involve local Kharkiv professionals, engineers, and scientists. Experiments in scientific work organization conducted at the locomotive plant and VEK factories by engineers Kapeller and Sakharov were examined. A project to establish a pilot plant under the guidance of Prof. Svishev and engineer Kotelnikov had been coordinated with the Ukrainian Council of People's Economy and Kharkiv Council of People's Economy.

The institute persistently sought collaboration with the remnants of the Medical Society, the Literacy Society, the Association of Engineers, as well as specialists from the People's Commissariat of Education, the SCNE, and the Southern Bureau of the AUCCTU. Consultations were held on bringing psychology specialists from Moscow to Kharkiv. At factories like locomotive plant, "Serp i Molot", and Electrosila, over 1,300 workers in the hot metal processing workshops underwent a medical-anthropological examination. In the foundry workshops, up to 80% of the city's foundry workers were covered. A sanitary and hygienic profile of foundry professions was compiled, detailing the work process for each profession. The data was subjected to statistical analysis. A series of labor protection measures were proposed, and profession-specific profiles were developed, intended to serve as the foundation for new methodologies in the professional selection of workers.

=== Psychodynamics (Giftedness Research) ===
Research on giftedness and intelligence began, presumably, in the interests of the People's Commissariat for Education of the Ukrainian SSR, to which the institute was transferred in 1922. The research was led by M.Y. Syrkin, the eminent member of the Kharkiv school of psychology and was oriented towards international scientific centers and contemporary methodologies. The acquisition of computational machinery enabled the mass administration and processing of psychological tests. University preparatory students (rabfak), university students, and school students in Kharkiv underwent this testing. By order of M. Frunze, Red Army soldiers and cadets were also included in the research. In 1925, 15,000 individuals were tested.

The data revealed heterogeneity in the distribution of intelligence (IQ) across the examined groups. It was found that children of "proletarian" backgrounds showed comparatively poorer results in some test types.

Based on the research findings, the institute proposed a so-called "educational advancement" program. It suggested conducting general intellectual development testing of primary school students and then reserving spots for the most successful among them in higher educational institutions. The direct economic effect, based on the elimination of inefficient efforts to educate the less capable, was estimated to be in the millions of rubles. According to the researchers, society could benefit even more from the rapid advancement of intellectually gifted students.

This project faced sharp opposition from Nadezhda Krupskaya. In essence, it contradicted the entire system of social mobility that had been established in the early USSR, where preference was given to people of "proletarian" origins, and promotions were made based on the party-youth organization line.

=== Organizational Analysis ===
Since 1922, researchers from the institute actively developed the method of organizational analysis using so-called "function-graphic schemes." These schemes vividly illustrated the pathways, connections, time expended, and workload of operational links within various organizations.

Practically speaking, the activities of the Kharkiv Labor Exchange, the State Financial Department (Gubfinotdel), Kharkiv cooperatives like Vukoopspilka (VUKS), HRC, and "Larёk" were studied. Chronometry was conducted, identifying "bottlenecks" in the organization of the studied entities, redundant and duplicated documentation, unnecessary operations, and positions. Standard operating procedures were compiled. The institute designed and proposed to clients updated production process schemes. For instance, in the State Financial Department, it was suggested to reduce the number of documentation approval stages from five to two and reduce three forms of documents to just one. An experiment from May to August 1924 demonstrated that with the new working scheme, queues were eliminated and the document acceptance process was expedited fourfold with the same workforce size.

The task to investigate the cooperatives aimed to understand why customers were abandoning their services in favor of unaffiliated individual sellers known as "Nepmen." The conducted chronometry revealed that only 10-15% of the time spent on order fulfillment was used productively – for selection and packaging of goods, calculation, and documentation. Conversely, the remaining 75% of the time, or 30 hours, was wasted in "waiting before and after an operation," essentially getting lost while navigating bureaucratic checks and balances. A project developed by the institute's specialists in June 1924 for the optimization of VUKS operations proposed reducing the number of steps from 28 to 9, with 6 mandatory steps for customers, and cutting down the number of documents from 16 to 6 and the number of operators from 20 to 8. This reduced the order execution time by 7-8 times. The project included a standard operation chart, document forms, and guidelines. Within VUKS, the project met with "extreme hostility from VUKS's senior officials, but was warmly received by the direct technical operators." In the end, the board decided on its full implementation, but the institute was excluded from participating in it.

A project that studied the product turnover in Kharkiv cooperatives HCRK and "Laryok" (which comprised 45 and 40 retail stores supplied from a central warehouse, respectively) was comprehensive. It aimed to optimize inventory management techniques. This included replacing the existing invoice system with a tear-off voucher system, transitioning from a book-based system to a card-based one, and introducing a differential product release accounting based on customer types. The project also entailed standardizing inventory levels, providing sample documents, instructions, and staff structures. Two variations of the project were developed, with one of them proposing the use of the tabulating machines known as Powers. Implementing the new accounting system drastically reduced the volume of product capital in circulation while ensuring more efficient assortment regulation across the network. Additionally, the mechanization of the accounting made it even more accurate, cutting costs nearly in half.

=== Tax Accounting Overhaul ===
In 1925, a group led by Evsei Liberman proposed a significant overhaul of the tax accounting system in the Ukrainian SSR, transitioning it to a mechanized basis. Simplified forms of individual tax payments, detailing the time, place, taxpayer category, tax type, and payment amount were to be sent to the central station of the NKF (National Commissariat of Finance). Here, they would be mechanically card-indexed and sorted in any required order, counted, and printed in fiscal, statistical-budgetary, and cash accounting reports and tables. This system aimed to address the challenges of timeliness and accuracy in accounting. Lower-tier financial institutions, like cash offices and financial departments, were relieved from the labor-intensive primary processing and from the need to maintain tax records. The cohort of tax cash collectors expanded to include post office, bank, and savings bank cashiers. Qualified personnel of tax authorities were freed from unrelated cashier and banking functions. The NKF had the ability to promptly analyze tax inflows with an unprecedented depth. The project was cost-effective; its implementation paid off in the first year. Essentially, the project adapted a similar tax accounting system that was operational in Britain, Belgium, and being introduced in Germany.

In October 1925, Evsei Liberman and the head of the Organizational Department of the NKF of the Ukrainian SSR, Lyubimov, were dispatched to Moscow to defend their project. As a result of their discussions, it was recognized that implementing the project was of significant interest, and any contentious issues could only be resolved through practical experience. However, the project was not implemented. During a subsequent reduction in the import plan, the funds allocated for the purchase of tabulating equipment were affected.

=== Mechanized Accounting ===
In 1925, under the guidance of Evsei Liberman, efforts began to optimize and mechanize accounting procedures in industrial enterprises. Due to "currency difficulties", profitable mechanization projects for metallurgical enterprises in Dnepropetrovsk and the “Americanka' Mine” were disrupted. The work at the Kharkiv agricultural machinery factory Serp i Molot (formerly plants owned by the Gelferich-Sade and Melgoze firms before nationalization) was more prolonged.

The management of Serp i Molot was presented with a plant accounting organization project. It was anticipated that this system would not only be less labor-intensive and more efficient but also provide analytical capabilities for production analysis and further optimization. In 1925, the Institute established the first mechanical data processing center (mashinoschetnaya stantsiya) in the USSR at the Serp i Molot plant, where bulk plant accounting materials were processed.

In 1927, Evsei Liberman proposed an updated system for standardized production accounting, seemingly an adapted version of Standard costing by G. Charter Harrison . In Liberman's proposal, the standard accounting system was integrated with the enterprise department's economic calculations. Each department was expected to maintain its balance sheet and receive material rewards if actual production costs were below the standards.

However, the project's implementation faced challenges. The factory management lacked interest in the project and struggled to absorb the investments allocated within the industrialization policy framework. A significant challenge was the initial accounting setup, hindered by an extremely low production and management culture and the prevalence of low-skilled, underpaid labor. Attempts to pressurize the enterprise by the People's Commissariat of Workers' and Peasants' Inspection of the Ukrainian SSR were unsuccessful.

== Bibliography ==
- Dunaevsky, F.R. (1922). Zadacha prosveshcheniya [The Task of Enlightenment]. Kharkov: Eksperimentalnaya Shkola-Klub Pechatnogo Dela. pp. 88.
- Vseukrainskyi Institut Truda (1923). Trudy Vseukrainskogo instituta truda [Works of the All-Ukrainian Institute of Labor] (in Russian). Vol. 1. Kharkov: "Put' Prosveshcheniya" and "Institut Truda". pp. XVI, 203, X.
- Vseukrainskyi Institut Truda (1928). Trudy Vseukrainskogo instituta truda [Works of the All-Ukrainian Institute of Labor] (in Russian). Vol. 2: About the Preconditions of Rational Organization. Kharkov: "Put' Prosveshcheniya" and "Institut Truda". pp. VIII, 340.
- Vseukrainskyi Institut Truda (1928). Trudy Vseukrainskogo instituta truda [Works of the All-Ukrainian Institute of Labor] (in Russian). Vol. 3: Measurements of Intelligence. Kharkov: "Put' Prosveshcheniya" and "Institut Truda". pp. VIII, 276.

== See also ==
- Evsei Liberman
- Kharkov school of psychology
