= Assault Forces (Ukraine) =

Military branch established in 2025

Assault Forces of the Armed Forces of Ukraine
- Штурмові Війська Збро́йних Сил Украї́ни
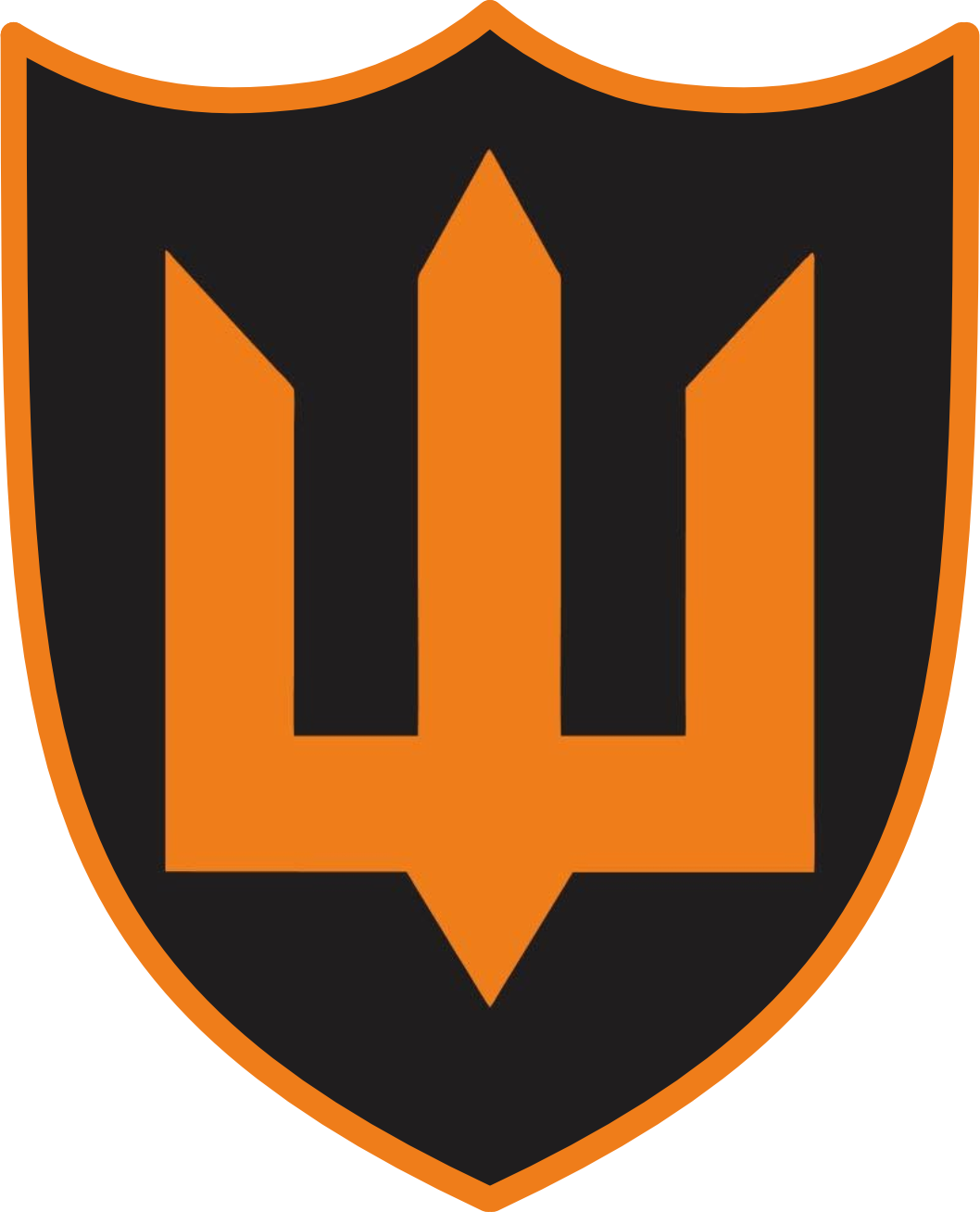
- Assault Force Shoulder Sleeve Insignia
- Active: September 2025 — present
- Country: Ukraine
- Allegiance: Armed Forces of Ukraine
- Type: Assault infantry

The Assault Forces of the Armed Forces of Ukraine (Ukrainian: Штурмові війська Збро́йних сил Украї́ни, Shturmovi viysʹka Zbróynykh syl Ukrayíny) is a branch of the Armed Forces of Ukraine dedicated to assault infantry. The branch was established in September 2025 as a specialized branch which reports directly to the Commander-in-Chief. The Assault Forces are separate from the Ukrainian Air Assault Forces in that Assault Forces are rapid-reaction units which specialize in offensive combat, while the Air Assault Forces specialize in both offense and defense. The 225th Separate Assault Regiment became the first unit to be moved from the Ground Forces to the Assault Forces. In addition, a drone unit was planned.

== Units ==
- 1st Assault Regiment
- 24th Assault Regiment
- 25th Assault Regiment
- 33rd Assault Regiment
- 210th Assault Regiment
- 225th Assault Regiment
- 253rd Assault Regiment
- 425th Assault Regiment
- 475th Assault Regiment
- 49th Assault Battalion
- 214th Assault Battalion

== Reception ==
The establishment of the Assault Forces was criticized by Solomiia Bobrovska, who compared the proposed branch to a "private army" that would divert functions from the Air Assault Forces branch.
