= 225th Separate Assault Regiment =

- 225 Окремий штурмовий полк
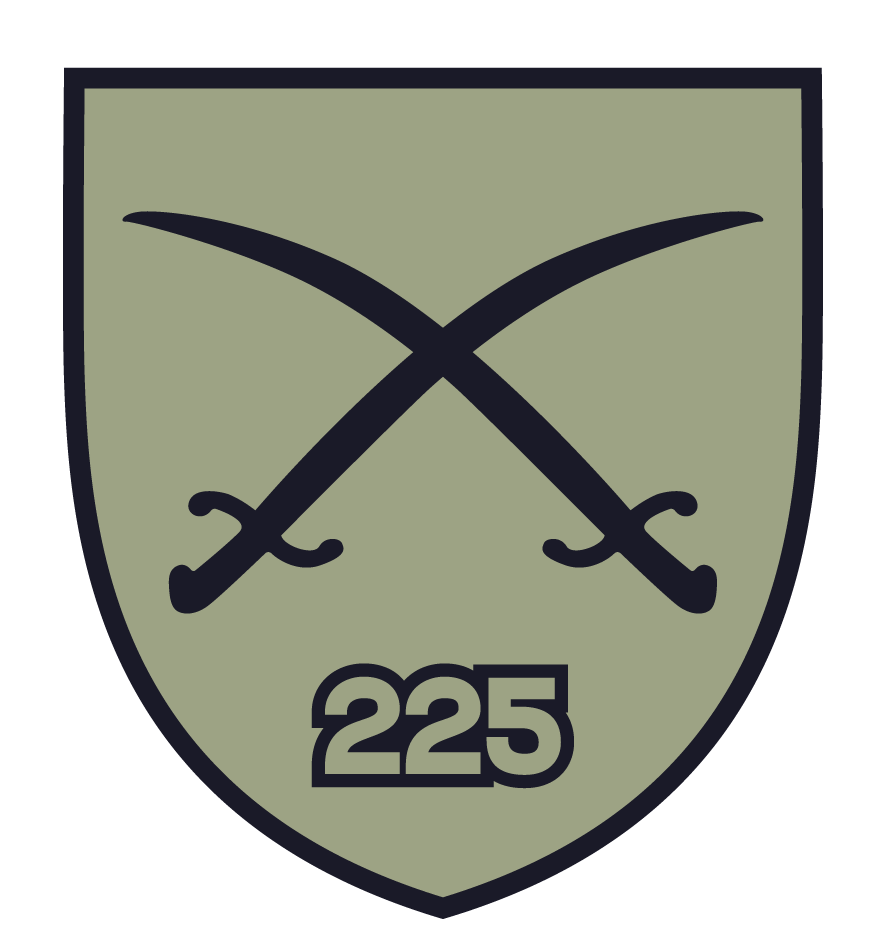
- Active: March 2022 — present
- Country: Ukraine
- Allegiance: Armed Forces of Ukraine
- Branch: Ukrainian Ground Forces
- Type: Assault Forces
- Size: Regiment
- Part of: Joint Rapid Response Forces Command
- Engagements: Russian invasion of Ukraine (2022): Battle of Kharkiv (2022); Battle of Bakhmut; Battle of Avdiivka (2023–2024); Battle of Chasiv Yar; Kursk offensive (2024–present)

Commanders
- Current commander: Oleh Shyriaiev

The 225th Separate Assault Regiment (Ukrainian: 225 Окремий штурмовий полк) is an assault regiment of the Ukrainian Armed Forces.

In March 2022, following the Russian invasion of Ukraine, the unit was first formed as the 225th battalion of the 127th Territorial Defense Brigade, established in Kharkiv. It was initially deployed in the Kharkiv region and, later, in Bakhmut. After engaging in the battles of Bakhmut in the winter/spring of 2022-2023, the unit was converted into a separate assault battalion. It then fought in the battles of Avdiivka and Chasiv Yar, from autumn 2023 until summer 2024. In August 2024, it was transferred to Sumy oblast, and acted as a breakthrough assault unit during the Ukrainian incursion into the Kursk region. The unit was again reorganized into the 225th assault regiment in February 2025.

== History ==
=== Territorial Defense Brigade ===
The 225th battalion was formed on March 8, 2022, as part of the newly established 127th Territorial Defense Brigade of Kharkiv. The unit consisted of mainly volunteers from Kharkiv who enlisted after the Russian invasion began.

=== 225th Separate Assault Battalion ===
After the success of the Kharkiv counteroffensive, part of the brigade, including the 225th, moved to Donetsk Oblast and went on to fight near the town of Bakhmut.

Having fought in Bakhmut for several months, the unit was transferred from Territorial Defense to the Ukrainian Ground Forces in the form of an assault battalion. Most of its service members came from different districts of Kharkiv and its Oblast.

=== 225th Assault Regiment ===
The 225th Assault Battalion was reformed into the 225th Assault Regiment on February 4, 2025. Since the Russian invasion of Ukraine began, the unit has evolved from a territory defense unit to a regiment directly subordinate to the Land Forces Command.

== Russian invasion of Ukraine ==
=== Kharkiv Counteroffensive ===
In 2022, upon formation the 225th took place in the defense of Kharkiv. During the defense of Kharkiv the 225th confirmed destruction of Soviet monuments in the city, recording the removal of a statue of Soviet military leader Marshal Georgy Zhukov.

The counteroffensive in Kharkiv began in September 2022. The 225th participated in the reclaiming of territory.

=== Eastern Ukraine ===
From 2022 to 2024, after the defense of Kharkiv, the 225th was deployed in multiple fronts in the Donbas, an area in Eastern Ukraine.

In the spring of 2022-2023 the 225th took part in the battle for Bakhmut. The 225th, now a battalion, would repel advancing Russian infantry throughout the engagement.

In February 2024, as part of the Battle of Avdiivka, the battalion was defending Lastochkyne. In the winter of 2024 Russia had penetrated into Avdiiivka and an evacuation order was given February 17th. The 225th helped to hold the evacuation corridor during the battle for Avdiivka while the main Ukrainian forces withdrew. The effort became known as the "road of life".

After Avdiivka, the 225th shifted to the area of Chasiv Yar, an area near the city of Donetsk. The unit defended the Donets-Donbas canal, as the only battalion holding positions beyond the waterway, a critical position blocking an approach to Chasiv Yar. For 70 days the 225th held position under constant assault.

UAV drone units began to turn the tide in the battle. Drones and power banks were air dropped in to soldiers. In May 2024, the battalion captured a Russian Т-90 "Breakthrough" tank. On July 9th 2024, information surfaced that the servicemen of the 225th separate assault battalion and the 223rd military infantry brigade broke out of the 70-day encirclement on their way to Chasiv Yar.

The battalion's personnel was expanded in July 2024.

=== Kursk Offensive ===
In the beginning of August 2024, news arose that the battalion is participating in the Kursk offensive, having entered the Oblast on August 6th, 2024. As announced by Oleksandr Kovalenko, subunits of the battalion have been responsible for breakthroughs in the Russian line of defense and in entering as far as possible into the Kursk Oblast of Russia since the first days of their operation.

In the first days of the offensive, the battalion took control of the village of Darino.

On August 11th, the battalion captured a group of roughly 8 prisoners, possibly from the control point of the 18th Guards Motor Rifle Brigade of the 28th Separate Motor Rifle Brigade under the 144th Motor Rifle Division. On August 13th, the subdivision of the battalion "Black Swan" took control of the Lyubimovka locality of Kursk Oblast and broke up a subdivision of the Kadyrovites.

On August 15th, the battalion claimed that the Kursk Offensive was being continued and published a video containing the capture of Russian fighters. On the 17th, the battalion posted a video with a captured Russian company commander, who was requesting to be exchanged for captured Mariupol defenders of the Azov brigade.

On August 27th, the battalion took into captivity a Kadyroitev soldier and a grenade launcher operator commander of African descent, serving in the Russian forces.

On September 9th, the battalion published another video with a Kursk Oblast enemy captive.

On September 25th, Russian television propagandists called the battalion elite and "equipped with the best Western tech".

Oleksandr Kovalenko evaluated the 225th battalion to be one of the leading breakthrough subdivisions of the Kursk operation.

==== Barrier troops and abuse incidents ====
According to an investigation by Ukrainian journalist Anna Kaliuzhna, the 225th Assault Regiment's commander, Oleh Shyriaiev gave orders in both text and video form during the Kursk offensive which told soldiers of the regiment to treat deserters as the enemy and to shoot them on sight. According to accounts from soldiers of the regiment, many of who were from the unit's penal battalion, said that they were threatened with being shot if they retreated. They also told Kaliuzhna that soldiers of the 225th Assault Regiment's penal battalion were held against their will and beaten in basements which were used as makeshift prisons. Some soldiers were also reported to have been tied to the "tree of turth" and beaten. During the investigation, Shyriaiev claimed that he was referring to Russian soldiers disguising themselves with Ukrainian uniforms.

=== Sumy Region ===
In October 2025 the regiment liberated four villages in the Dnipropetrovsk Region (Sosnivka, Khoroshe, Novoselivka, and Sichneve).

In December 2025, a heavy quadcopter drone from the regiment was used to drop a Volokushi elastic stretcher to help an assault group from the 3rd Battalion successfully evacuate a wounded comrade.

== Weaponry ==
- Marder 1А3
- M2 Bradley
- fifteen Kozak-2M1
- twenty-five Kozak-5
- captured BTR-D vehicles

== Losses ==
- February 20, 2024 — Rybny Vladyslav Gennadiyovych ("Риба"). 31 years old, from Obukhiv. Died around Lastochkyne in the Pokrovsk Raion of Donetsk Oblast.
- September 14, 2024 — Huliy Lyubomyr, junior sergeant, assault squad commander. Died near the Novy Put' village in the Kursk Oblast of Russia.
- September 29, 2024 — Minayev Dmytro. 11.09.1996, from Lviv.
- October 11, 2024 — Pelyh Pavlo. 8.07.1979, from Lviv.
- November 9, 2024 — Lov'yan Serhiy Stepanovych ("Lyovik"). 31.07.1982, from Kachyn, Kamin-Kashyrskyi Raion, Volyn Oblast. Died near the village Novoivanovka in the Kursk Oblast of Russia.
- December 30, 2024 — Pavlyshe Nazar. 20.04.1992, from Dublyany.

== Links ==
- https://225.army/ — website
