= Decorations of the President of Ukraine for Humanitarian Participation in the Anti-Terrorist Operation =

Presidential honor of Ukraine

Decorations of the President of Ukraine for Humanitarian Participation in the Anti-Terrorist Operation Відзнака Президента України «За гуманітарну участь в антитерористичній операції»
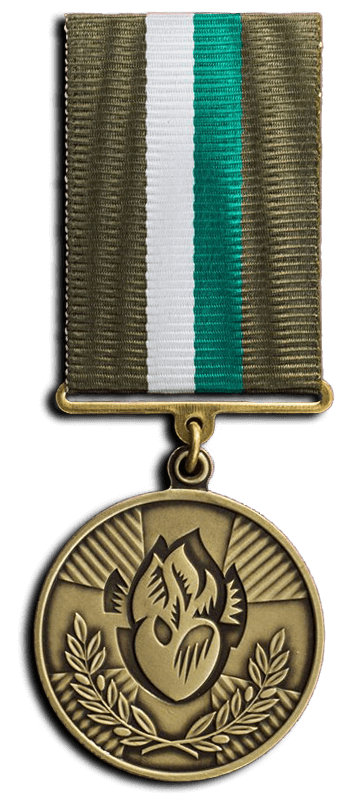

Awarded by President of Ukraine
- Type: Presidential honor
- Established: 17 February 2016
- Country: Ukraine
- Ribbon
- Criteria: Humanitarian Participations in Anti-Terrorist Operation in Donetsk and Luhansk regions
- Status: Currently constituted

Precedence
- Next (higher): Decorations of the President of Ukraine for Participation in the Anti-Terrorist Operation
- Next (lower): Decorations of the President of Ukraine for the Defence of Ukraine

The Decorations of the President of Ukraine for Humanitarian Participation in the Anti-Terrorist Operation (Ukrainian: Відзнака Президента України «За гуманітарну участь в антитерористичній операції», romanized: Vidznaka Prezydenta Ukrainy «Za humanitarnu uchast v antyterorystychnii operatsii») is the state award of Ukraine and was established by the President of Ukraine to honor those who deserve recognition for their contributions to counterterrorism operations in the Donetsk and Luhansk Oblasts, including employees of businesses, institutions, and organizations, as well as other individuals who actively participated in such operations or voluntarily ensured their successful execution.

== History ==
By decree issued on 17 February 2016, Ukrainian President Petro Poroshenko established the medal for "humanitarian engagement in an anti-terrorist action." Employees of businesses, institutions, and organizations as well as other individuals who voluntarily assisted in the conduct of an anti-terrorist operation in the Donetsk and Luhansk oblasts and performed volunteer work while being situated nearby during the operation's implementation will receive awards, it was decided by decree. There were 5,500 President of Ukraine medals issued in 2017 for humanitarian engagement in the anti-terrorist operation.

== Prerequisites ==
The Decree of the President of Ukraine on the award is as follows:

- It is awarded to employees of enterprises, institutions and organizations, other persons who were involved or voluntarily ensured the conduct of an anti-terrorist operation in the Donetsk and Luhansk oblasts, carried out volunteer activities, being directly in the area of the anti-terrorist operation during its period carrying out.
- The awarding of the award may be made posthumously.
- The presentation of the award is carried out in a solemn atmosphere by the President of Ukraine or on his behalf by the heads of central executive bodies, state bodies that lead military formations formed in accordance with the laws, heads of other state bodies, heads of regional and Kyiv city state administrations, heads of foreign diplomatic institutions of Ukraine.
- Awarding of the award is carried out in accordance with the list of persons presented for the awarding of the award, which is drawn up and approved by the relevant central bodies of executive power, state bodies that exercise leadership of military formations formed in accordance with laws, and other state bodies.
- The person awarded the distinction is awarded a diploma of the prescribed A4 format along with the distinction.

== Description ==
The presidential honors have a standard diameter of 32 mm with a circle-shaped emblem made of brass with a patina look and has a border around it. The stylized depiction of a flaming heart is surrounded by olive branches on the obverse side of the badge's background, in the center of which is a cross. The badge's reverse is a flat surface. On the reverse side, in the center, is a tiny version of the Ukrainian Coat of Arms, with the words "FOR HUMANITARIAN PARTICIPATION" and "IN ANTI-TERRORIST OPERATION" written in the upper and lower semicircles, respectively.

The ribbon is dark green silk moiré, standard 28 mm wide, with two longitudinal stripes of white and light green (from left to right) in the center, each 5 mm wide. The badge is attached to the garment with a safety fastener located on the back of the pad. The bar of the award is a rectangular metal plate covered with a ribbon, as on the badge pad. The bar has a standard height of 12 mm and a width of 28 mm. The badge is made of brass with a patina effect and is a reduced image of the badge (without a pad) with a diameter of 12 mm. On the back of the badge, there is a needle and collet.

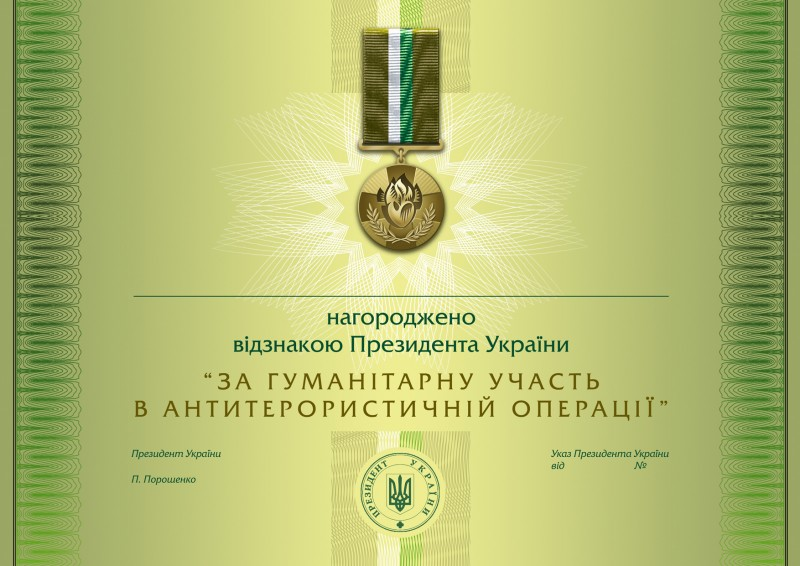
Certificate for the presidential honor

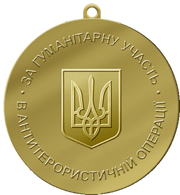
Other side of the medal

== Notable recipients ==
- Marta Pivovarenko
- Oleksii Yukov

== See also ==
- Merited Artist of Ukraine
- Honorary titles of Ukraine
- Economy of Ukraine

== Literature cited ==
- Ukaz Prezidenta Ukraїni: Pro vіdznachennja derzhavnimi nagorodami Ukraїni pracіvnikіv zasobіv masovoї іnformacії Указ Президента України: Про відзначення державними нагородами України працівників засобів масової інформації [Decree of the President of Ukraine: On awarding the state awards to media workers], Kyiv: Office of the President of Ukraine, 4 June 2003
- Davidenko, Boris, ed. (18 November 2014), "Abdullin Aleksandr" Абдуллин Александр [Abdullin Alexander], uk:Ligamedia (in Russian), Kyiv: uk:Група Компаній «ЛІГА»
- Ukaz №1870-X: Pro zatverdzhennja Polozhennja pro derzhavnі nagorodi Ukraїns'koї RSR Указ №1870-X: Про затвердження Положення про державні нагороди Української РСР [Decree 1870-X: On adoption of the Regulation on State Awards of the Ukrainian SSR], Kyiv: Ukrainian parliament, 7 May 1981
- Zakon Ukraїni: Pro derzhavnі nagorodi Ukraїni Закон України: Про державні нагороди України [Law of Ukraine Regarding the State Awards of Ukraine], Kyiv: Ukrainian parliament, 5 June 2017
- Ukaz Prezidenta Ukraїni: Pro pochesnі zvannja Ukraїni Указ Президента України: Про почесні звання України [President's Decree: Regarding honorary titles of Ukraine], Kyiv: Office of the President of Ukraine, 5 July 2016
- Zhaleiko, Boris (1972), Prokhorov, Aleksandr (ed.), "Zvanija pochjotnye" Звания почётные [Honorary titles], Bolshaya Sovetskaya Entsiklopediya Большая советская энциклопедия [Great Soviet Encyclopedia], vol. 9 (3rd ed.), Moscow: Советская энциклопедия, LCCN 71485835, OCLC 810278
- Stolbetsov, Oleg (20 July 2018), "V Rossii uchrezhdeno zvanie "Zasluzhennyj zhurnalist"" В России учреждено звание «Заслуженный журналист» [The title of Merited Journalist established in Russia], kursktv.ru, Kursk: Alekhin and Co
- Buzalo, Viktor (2011), "Pochesnі zvannja Ukraїni" Почесні звання України [Honorary titles of Ukraine], Enciklopedіja іstorії Ukraїni Енциклопедія історії України [Encyclopedia of Ukrainian History], vol. 8, Kyiv: Naukova Dumka, pp. 472–473, ISBN 9789660011427, OCLC 1110099116
- Ukaz Prezidenta Ukraїni: Pro vіdznachennja derzhavnimi nagorodami Ukraїni Указ Президента України: Про відзначення державними нагородами України [Decree of the President of Ukraine: On the awarding of state awards], Kyiv: Office of the President of Ukraine, 15 August 2012
- "Bezljudnaja Anna Vital'evna" Безлюдная Анна Витальевна [Bezlyudnaya Anna Vitalievna], uk:UBR (in Russian), Kyiv: Мультимедіа-інвест Груп, 25 November 2019
- Ukaz Prezidenta Ukraїni: Pro vіdznachennja derzhavnimi nagorodami Ukraїni z nagodi Dnja Konstitucії Ukraїni Указ Президента України: Про відзначення державними нагородами України з нагоди Дня Конституції України [President's Decree: On awarding the state awards of Ukraine on the occasion of the Constitution Day of Ukraine], Kyiv: Office of the President of Ukraine, 27 June 2015
