= Oleksii Yukov =

Ukrainian war archaeologist (1985–2026)

Oleksii Oleksandrovych Yukov (Ukrainian: Олексій Олександрович Юков; 9 September 1985 – 5 August 2026) was a Ukrainian war archaeologist and head of Platzdarm (Ukrainian: Плацдарм), a volunteer group that searches for and retrieves the corpses of dead and missing soldiers in Ukraine.

== Early life ==
Yukov was born in Sloviansk, Donetsk Oblast, on 9 September 1985.

His first experience with the dead occurred when he was seven years old. During the construction of a hospital, part of the nearby Staromiske Cemetery was destroyed, and the ground was littered with skulls, bones, and coffins.

Another early impression was when he was 13 years old. Yukov went to a forest near Sviatohirsk, where he saw a meadow fully covered by bones of the soldiers of the Second World War. His shock at the fact that, half a century after the war's end, the soldiers were not properly identified and buried led him to repurpose nearby trenches as graves, burying the bones there. Later, he joined the "Hola Dolyna" (Ukrainian: Гола долина) and "East. West" (Ukrainian: Схід. Захід) search groups.

== Platzdarm ==
In 2013, Yukov founded the search unit of the Association of Researchers of Military-Historical Heritage "Platzdarm" (Ukrainian: Асоціація дослідників військово-історичної спадщини «Плацдарм»).

In May 2014, during the battle of Sloviansk, Platzdarm was recovering the bodies of the pilots of two downed Ukrainian helicopters. A few weeks later, Yukov was captured by Russian-backed separatist forces, who were about to execute him "for sabotage and treason", based on a 1941 order. However, he was saved after they discovered the phone number of a commander linked to Igor Girkin on Yukov's phone and called him; the commander ordered them to bring Yukov back to his home.

In September 2022, while searching for the body of a member of the 95th Air Assault Brigade in the liberated Kharkiv area, Yukov was injured by an explosion of a MON-50 anti-personnel landmine. His legs were injured and he lost an eye, which was later replaced by a prosthesis.

From 2014 to 2022, Platzdarm recovered the remains of some four thousand Soviet soldiers, two thousand soldiers of Nazi Germany and its allies, six hundred victims of political repression, and 150 soldiers of the First World War. From 2022 to 2026, it also recovered the bodies of over 3,500 soldiers of the Russo-Ukrainian war.

== Death ==
Yukov died on 5 August 2026, at the age of 40, after his car hit a landmine near Shandryholove, Donetsk Oblast. He received a memorial service in St Volodymyr's Cathedral, in Kyiv, on 8 August. He is survived by his wife, Yevhenia Kaluhina, and daughter.

== Awards ==
- Hero of Ukraine (2026, posthumous)
- Award of the President of Ukraine "For Humanitarian Participation in the Anti-Terrorist Operation" (2017)
- Award of the President of Ukraine "Golden Heart" (2024): "For significant contributions in the provision of volunteer aid and the development of the volunteer movement, particularly during the defense of Ukraine, defense of the population's safety and the state's interests in relation to the armed aggression of the Russian Federation against Ukraine"
