= Denys Shleha =

Ukrainian serviceman (born 1982)

- Денис Шлега

Personal details
- Born: Denys Oleksiiovych Shleha; 1 May 1982 (age 44) Pavlohrad, Dnipropetrovsk Oblast
- Education: National Guard Military Academy of Ukraine

Military service
- Allegiance: Ukraine
- Branch/service: National Guard of Ukraine
- Rank: Colonel
- Battles/wars: Russo-Ukrainian War; 2022 Russian invasion of Ukraine; Siege of Mariupol
- Awards

Denys Oleksiiovych Shleha (Ukrainian: Денис Олексійович Шлега; born 1 May 1982) is a Ukrainian serviceman, colonel of the National Guard of Ukraine, a participant of the Russian-Ukrainian war. Hero of Ukraine (2022).

== Biography ==
He graduated from the Kharkiv Institute of the National Guard of Ukraine (2003). He served in Dnipro from platoon commander to separate battalion commander; chief of staff of military unit 3021; chief of staff of the 5th Slobozhanska Brigade (Kharkiv); commander of military unit 3024 (2018–2021), from 2021 – commander of the 12th Dmytro Vyshnevetskyi Operational Brigade.

Participant in the ATO/JFO and defense of Mariupol.

On 15 May 2022, he said that there were about 600 wounded soldiers at Azovstal in the blockaded Mariupol, 40 of them in very serious condition. On 20 May, the entire garrison of Azovstal was evacuated to the territory of the occupied part of Donetsk Oblast.

On 21 September 2022, he was released from captivity in a prisoner of war exchange. Interned in Turkey.

On 8 July 2023, he returned to the territory of Ukraine.

== Awards ==
- Title of Hero of Ukraine with the Order of the Golden Star (1 October 2022)
- Order of Bohdan Khmelnytsky, III class (25 March 2022)
