= Medal "For Irreproachable Service" =

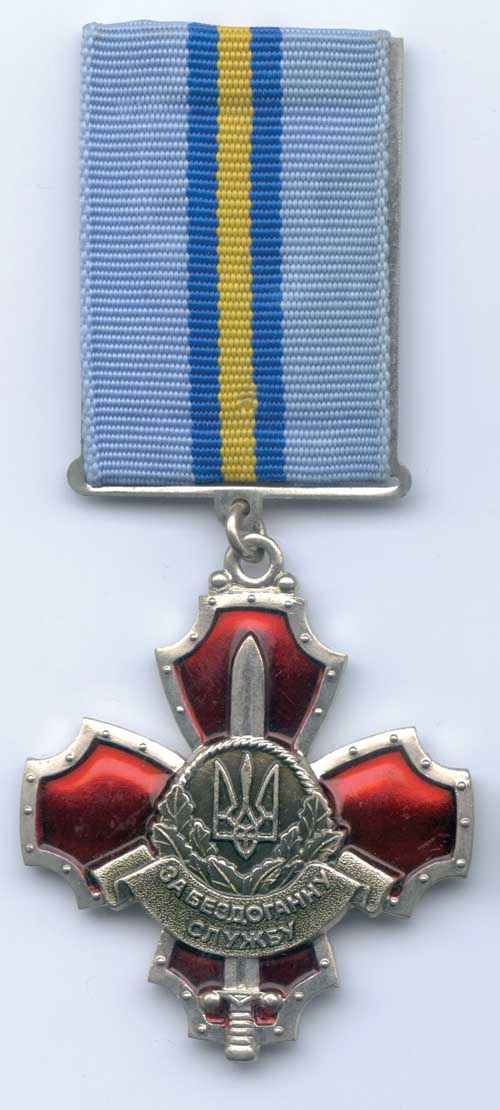
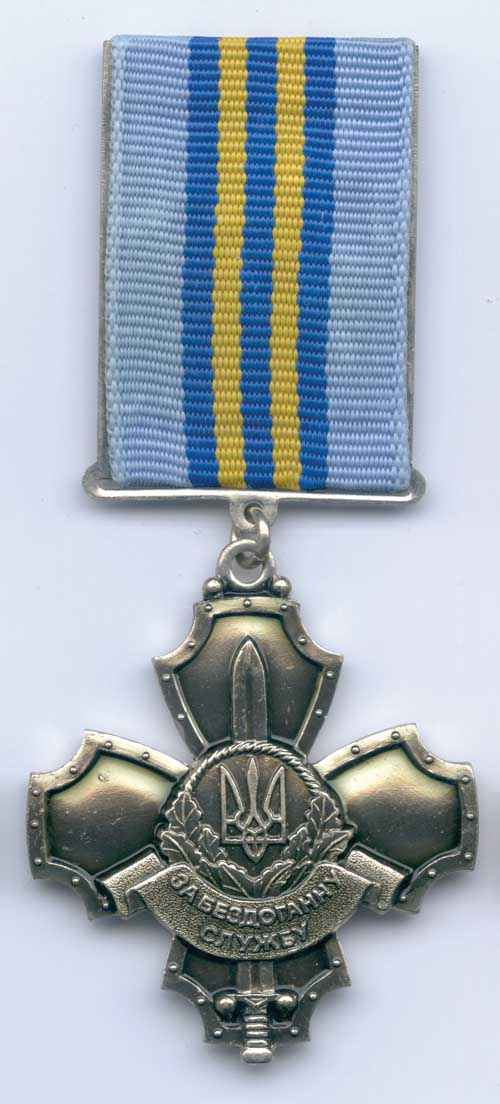
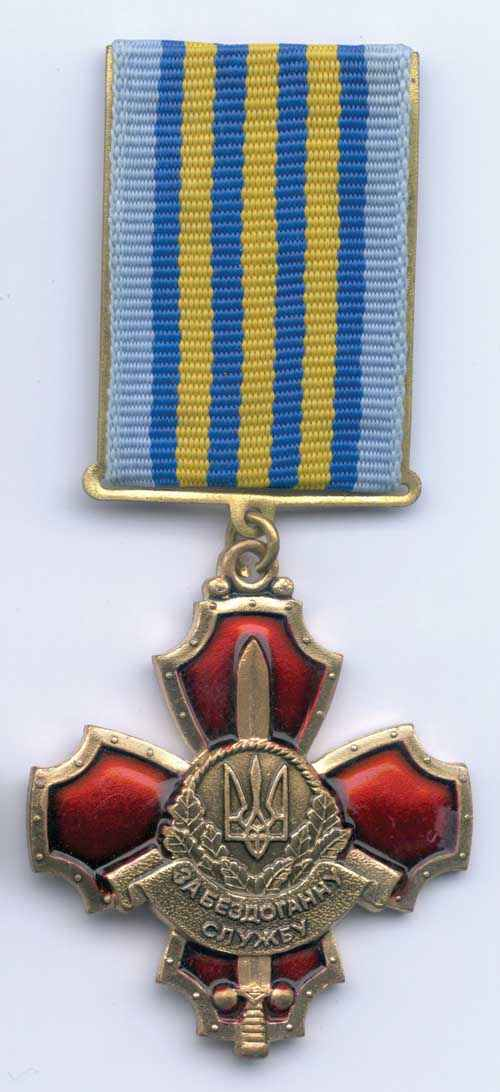
- The 1st (left), 2nd and 3rd class Medals "For Irreproachable Service"
- Type: Service medal
- Awarded for: Reaching a high degree of combat and professional training, success in exercising authority over subordinates and serving as an example of fidelity and allegiance while performing all other service duties in an excellent manner.
- Presented by: Ukraine
- Eligibility: Officers and Warrant Officers of the Armed Forces of Ukraine; Officers and enlisted men of the Ministry of Internal Affairs, Security Service of Ukraine, National Guard of Ukraine, Border Troops of Ukraine, Civil Defense of Ukraine
- Established: 5 October 1996
- Ribbon bar of the 1st class medal Ribbon bar of the 2nd class medal Ribbon bar of the 3rd Class medal

Precedence
- Next (higher): Medal For Military Service to Ukraine
- Next (lower): “Defender of the Motherland” Medal

The Medal "For Irreproachable Service" is a service medal of Ukraine. It was established by presidential decree on 5 October 1996. The medal is presented to officers and Warrant Officers of the Armed Forces of Ukraine as well as officers and enlisted men of the Ministry of Internal Affairs, Security Service of Ukraine, National Guard of Ukraine, Border Troops of Ukraine, Civil Defense of Ukraine. The medal rewards reaching a high level of combat and professional training, success in exercising authority over subordinates and serving as an example of fidelity and allegiance while performing all other service duties in an excellent manner.

== Criteria ==
The Medal "For Irreproachable Service" is presented in three classes, the first class being the highest. The medal is awarded to servicemen who have a record of perfect service, have been promoted in rank in a timely manner, and have a high degree of combat training, service training and professional activity. The first class is presented to those who meet all of the criteria and have served at least 20 years, the second class is for 15 years, and the third class is for 10 years. The Medal "For Irreproachable Service" is presented by decree of the President of Ukraine.
