= Kharkiv National University of Economics =

Public university in Kharkiv, Ukraine

Coordinates: 50°00′50″N 36°13′26″E

Simon Kuznets Kharkiv National University of Economics
- Харківський національний економічний університет ім. Семена Кузнеця
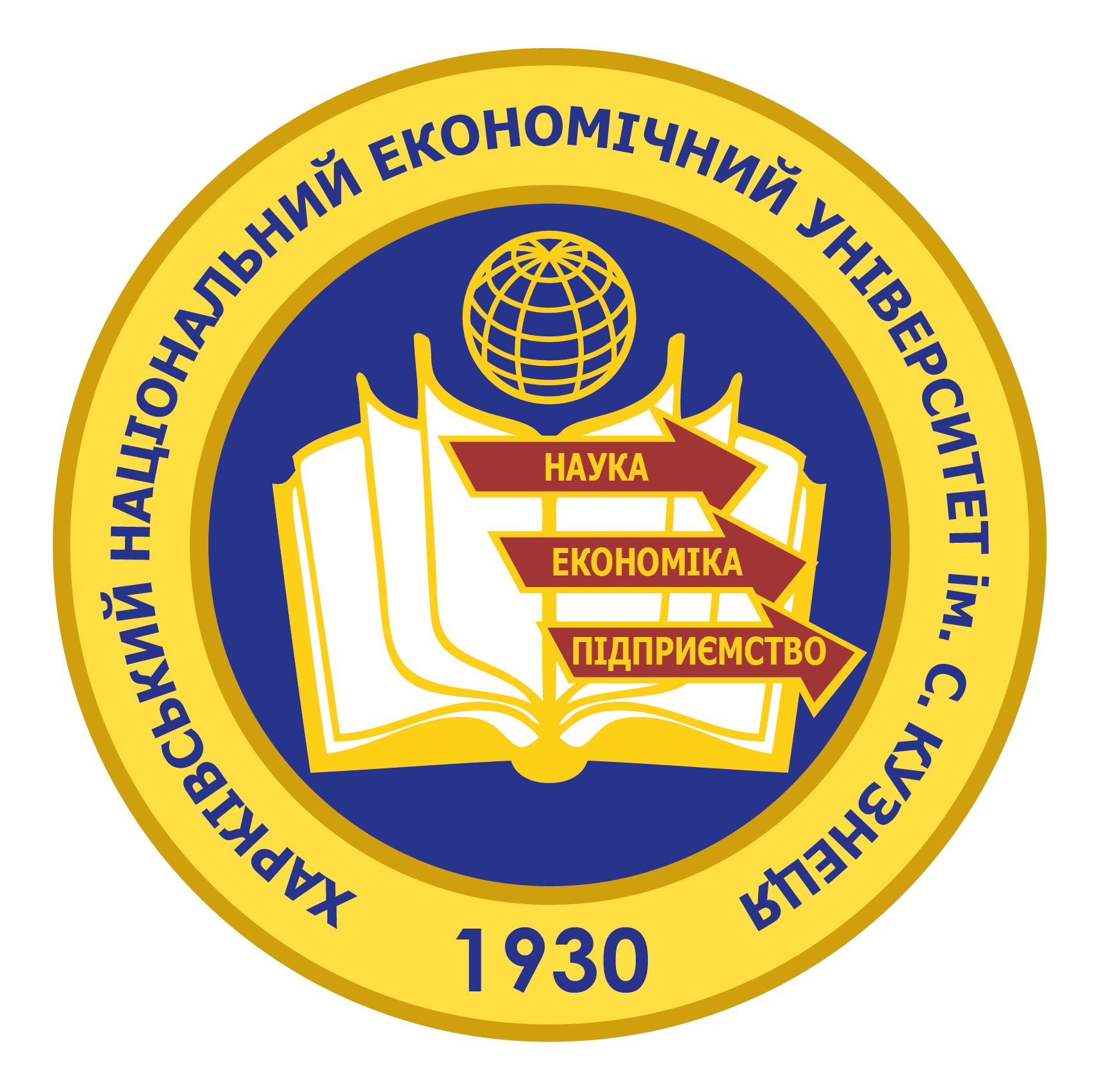
- Motto: Discere, cogitare, laborare docemus.
- Motto in English: We teach to learn, to think, to work.
- Type: Public University
- Established: 1930 (1912)
- Affiliations: Ministry of Education and Science of Ukraine
- Academic affiliations: EUA; Magna Charta Universitatum; AUF; ASECU
- Rector: Volodymyr Ponomarenko
- Faculty: 714
- Students: 9,972
- Undergraduates: 7,152
- Postgraduates: 2,672
- Doctoral students: 148
- Location: prosp. Nauky, 9A, 61001, Kharkiv, Ukraine
- Campus: Urban
- Nobel Laureates: 1
- Colours: Dark Blue and Copper
- Nickname: Inzhek
- Website: http://www.hneu.edu.ua/

University rankings

Regional – Overall
- QS Emerging Europe and Central Asia: 251-300 (2022)

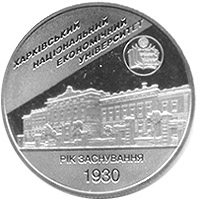
Anniversary coin minted by the National Bank of Ukraine for the 75 years official jubilee of the Kharkiv National University of Economics (2004). The historical building of the Kharkov School of Commerce named after Emperor Alexander III stamped in the obverse

The Simon Kuznets Kharkiv National University of Economics (Ukrainian: Харківський національний економічний університет імені Семена Кузнеця, romanized: Kharkivskyi natsionalnyi ekonomichnyi universytet imeni Semena Kuznetsia) is the largest state-sponsored economic higher educational and research university in Eastern Ukraine. The university was established in 1912 and was named after American economist Simon Kuznets, a noted alumnus, in 2013.

Annual celebration of the new academic year, 2010

== Notable alumni ==
- Mykhailo Chechetov, Ukrainian politician
- Simon Smith Kuznets, American economist, Nobel prize winner (1971)
- Evsei Liberman, Soviet economist, architect of the economic reforms of 1965
- Maria Quisling, wife of Nazi collaborator Vidkun Quisling
- Oleh Shyriaiev, Ukrainian military commander
- Victoria Spartz, member of the Indiana Senate, 2020 Republican candidate for Indiana's 5th congressional district

== Ratings ==
Ranking	2014	2013	2012	2011	2010	2009	2008	2007
	World							
Webometrics	5229	8861	5761					
	National							
Webometrics	47	64						
TOP-200 Ukraine	55	49	49	43	45	45	46	49
SciVerse Scopus	83	94	-					

== See also ==
- List of universities in Ukraine
