= Order For Brave Miners' Work =

Ukrainian state award

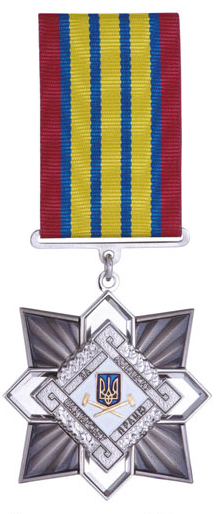
- Order For Brave Miners' Work (Third Class)
- Type: Three-grade order
- Presented by: Ukraine
- Status: Active
- Established: September 2, 2008
- First award: August 27, 2010 (3rd Class)
- Final award: September 24, 2017

Highlights
- Total: 147
- Total awarded posthumously: 1
- First, Second, and Third class ribbon bars of the order

Precedence
- Next (higher): Cross of Ivan Mazepa
- Next (lower): Medal For Military Service to Ukraine

The Order For Brave Miners' Work (Ukrainian: Орден «За доблесну шахтарську працю», romanized: Orden "Za doblesnu shakhtarsku pratsiu") of I, II and III degree is an award of Ukraine. The Order was instituted on September 2, 2008, by the Verkhovna Rada of Ukraine to honour workers that extract coal, iron ore, non-ferrous metal ores, rare-earth ores, manganese and uranium ores, workers of mine building enterprises.

The Order may be awarded to workers extracting coal, iron ore, non-ferrous and rare metal ores, manganese and uranium ores, workers of mine construction companies who are employed full-time in underground work.

The Order has three degrees; the highest degree of the order is the first degree.

The author of the insignia of the order is the artist O. Rudenko.

== History of the award ==
On September 2, 2008, the Verkhovna Rada of Ukraine adopted the Law of Ukraine № 345-VI "On Increasing the Prestige of Mining", according to which by amending the Law of Ukraine "On State Awards of Ukraine" a new state award of Ukraine was established – the Order of Valiant Mining »I, II, III degree.

On April 30, 2009, the Decree of the President of Ukraine Yushchenko № 282/2009 approved the Charter of the Order, which includes a description of the insignia of the Order.

=== Rewarding ===
On August 27, 2010, by the Decree of the President of Ukraine Yanukovych № 874/2010 "On awarding state awards of Ukraine to coal workers" the first 19 people were awarded the Order "For Valiant Mining" III degree for significant personal contribution to strengthening the energy potential of the state, many years of selfless mining work, high professionalism and on the occasion of the 75th anniversary of the Stakhanov movement and the Miner's Day.

On August 25, 2011, another 27 people were awarded the Order "For Valiant Mining Work" of the III degree.

On February 23, 2012, the Order of the III degree was awarded to the underground miner – foreman of the complex cleaning brigade of the joint-stock company "Marganets Mining and Processing Plant" Dzyabenko.

On July 4, 2012, Zubak, foreman of the miners of the Pokrovske Mine Management Joint-Stock Company (Krasnoarmeysk), was awarded the Order of the Third Degree.

On August 24, 2012, another 47 people were awarded the Order "For Valiant Mining Work" of the III degree.

On January 22, 2013, RM Bidnosheev, a miner of the cleaning face of the separate subdivision "Mine“ Progress "” of the state enterprise "Torezantratsyt" (Donetsk region), was awarded the Order of the III degree.

On August 22, 2013, another 30 people were awarded the Order "For Valiant Mining Work" of the III degree.

On August 30, 2015, another 20 people were awarded the Order "For Valiant Mining Work" of the III degree.

On August 24, 2017, the order of the III degree was awarded to Kochash Anatoliy Dmytrovych, a passer-by of the separate subdivision "Stakhanov Mine" of the state enterprise "Krasnoarmeyskugol" (Donetsk region).

On August 29, 2020, 12 more people were awarded the Order "For Valiant Mining" of the III degree.

== Statute of the Order ==
Awarding the Order "For Valiant Mining" is carried out consistently, starting with the III degree.

Awarding of the Order is carried out by the decree of the President of Ukraine.

A person awarded the Order of Valiant Mining of one degree may be nominated for the Order of the Next Degree not earlier than three years after the previous award, except for the presentation of persons for personal courage, heroism associated with production activities, as well as for outstanding achievements in this area.

Awarding the Order may be carried out posthumously.

The person awarded the order is awarded the badge of the order and the order book of the established sample.

== Description ==
The emblem of the Order "For Valiant Mining" is made of rock crystal and has the shape of a straight equilateral cross with pointed edges. In the center of the cross there is a rhombic medallion covered with white enamel, which depicts the small State Emblem of Ukraine. Under the small State Emblem of Ukraine there are crossed picks and a hammer made of yellow metal. The medallion is framed by an image of a ribbon interwoven in the corners, covered with dark red enamel with the inscription "For valiant mining work." At the top of the ribbon is bordered by branches of bay leaves, at the bottom – oak leaves. The cross is superimposed on a quadrangular star with diverging faceted black rays. The size of the insignia between the opposite ends of the cross is 42 mm.

The sign of the Order of the I degree – is made of silver, II and III degrees – of nickel silver. For the first degree of the sign of the order there is an inscription, an image of branches of laurel and oak leaves, a cross strip and a ribbon – yellow metal. For the II degree of the sign of the order there is an inscription, an image of branches of laurel and oak leaves, a cross strip and a ribbon – white metal. For the III degree of the sign of the order there is an inscription, an image of branches of laurel and oak leaves, a ribbon, a cross strip and a ribbon – white metal.

The reverse side of the sign is flat with a carved number for each step separately. With the help of a ring with an eye, the cross is connected with a rectangular metal block covered with a dark red silk moire ribbon with longitudinal stripes of blue and yellow:

- for the first degree – one yellow strip in the middle width – 10 mm and two blue strips on the sides – 2 mm each;
- for the second degree – two yellow strips in the middle 6 mm wide each, between which and on the sides – three blue strips 2 mm wide each;
- for the third degree – three yellow strips in the middle of 4 mm each, between which and on the sides – four blue strips 2 mm wide each.

Pad size: height – 45 mm, width – 28 mm. On the reverse side of the pad – a clasp for attaching the badge of the Order to clothing. The block of the sign of the Order of the I degree is made of yellow metal, II and III degrees – of white.

The bar of the Order "For Valiant Mining Work" is a rectangular metal plate covered with a corresponding ribbon. The size of a lath: height – 12 mm, width – 24 mm.

== The sequence of placement of signs of state awards of Ukraine ==
The badge of the Order "For Valiant Mining" of I, II, III degrees – on the left side of the chest after the award of the President of Ukraine – the Cross of Ivan Mazepa.
