= Cross of Ivan Mazepa =

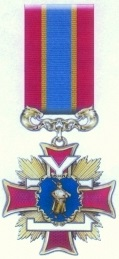
- Badge of the Cross of Ivan Mazepa
- Type: Single-grade cross
- Presented by: Ukraine
- Status: Active
- Established: March 26, 2009
- First award: August 18, 2009
- Final award: September 4, 2023

Highlights
- Total: 129
- Total awarded posthumously: 1
- Ribbon bar of the Cross of Ivan Mazepa

Precedence
- Next (higher): Order of Danylo Halytsky
- Next (lower): Order For Brave Miners' Work

The Cross of Ivan Mazepa (Ukrainian: Хрест Івана Мазепи) is an award of the President of Ukraine. The Cross was instituted on March 26, 2009 by the President of Ukraine Viktor Yushchenko to honour citizens of Ukraine, foreign citizens or stateless persons for significant contribution to the revival of national, cultural, artistic, spiritual, architectural, military and historical heritage of Ukraine, for achievements in state, diplomatic, humanistic, scientific, educational and charitable activity.

== History of the award ==
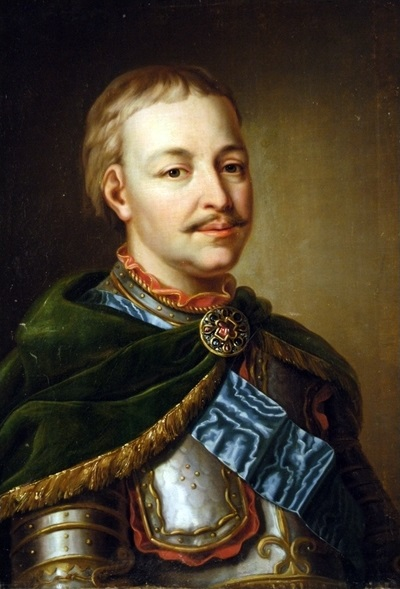
Ivan Mazepa, the namesake of the decoration

The Award of the President of Ukraine - the Cross of Ivan Mazepa was established by the Decree of the President of Ukraine Viktor Yushchenko on March 26, 2009.

== Provisions on distinction ==
Citizens of Ukraine, foreigners and stateless persons can be awarded the Ivan Mazepa Cross.

Ivan Mazepa was awarded the Cross by a decree of the President of Ukraine.

Ivan Mazepa may be awarded the Cross posthumously.

Ivan Mazepa will not be awarded the Cross again.

Submissions for the awarding of the Cross of Ivan Mazepa and presentation of this award are made in accordance with the Procedure for submission for awarding and presentation of state awards of Ukraine, approved by the Decree of the President of Ukraine of February 19, 2003 N 138.

The person awarded the Cross of Ivan Mazepa is awarded a badge and a certificate.

== Description of the sign ==
Ivan Mazepa's cross is made of gilded silver and has the shape of a straight equilateral cross with extended sides, the edges of which are concave inwards. The sides of the cross are covered with raspberry enamel. In the center of the cross there is a cartouche, on the blue background of which there is an image of a Cossack from the military seal of Hetman Ivan Mazepa. The cartouche is superimposed on the image of the heraldic figure "Kurch" of the coat of arms of Hetman Ivan Mazepa, covered with white enamel. Between the sides of the cross - diverging rays. All images are embossed. The stripes of the cross and the rays, the volutes of the cartouche, the image of the Cossack, the stripes of the figure "Kurch" - gilded

The size of the sign between the opposite ends of the cross is 42 mm. The reverse side of the sign of the Cross of Ivan Mazepa is flat with an engraved number.

By means of a ring with an ear the cross is connected with the rectangular block covered with a tape. The lower part of the pad is figured embossed. Pad size: height - 45 mm, width - 28 mm. On the back of the pad is a clasp for attaching the badge to clothing.

The ribbon of the Cross of Ivan Mazepa is a light blue silk moire with crimson longitudinal stripes on the sides and yellow in the middle. The width of the light blue strip is 10 mm, yellow - 2 mm, crimson - 7 mm each.

The slat of the Cross of Ivan Mazepa is a rectangular metal plate covered with tape. The size of a lath: height - 12 mm, width - 14 mm.

== Sequence of placement of signs of state awards of Ukraine ==
The award of the President of Ukraine - the Cross of Ivan Mazepa - on the left side of the chest after the sign of the Order of Danylo Halytsky.

== Persons awarded the Cross of Ivan Mazepa ==
129 people were awarded the Ivan Mazepa Cross of the President of Ukraine.

Statistics are given as of November 30, 2023.

The award was given to:

August 18, 2009 for significant personal contribution to the socio-economic and cultural development of the Ukrainian state, significant labor achievements and on the occasion of the 18th anniversary of Ukraine's independence.

1. Mazepa Vsevolod Hryhorovych - Chairman of the Council of Elders of the international public organization "Mazepa Family"

November 18, 2009 for outstanding personal contribution to the defense of the national idea, the formation and development of the Ukrainian independent state and active political and public activity

1. Bablyak Login Hryhorovych is an activist of the Kyiv branch of the Ukrainian Helsinki Union.
2. Ivanyuchenko Anatoliy Bogdanovich - Head of the Department of the Mykolayiv Regional State Administration, Chairman of the Mykolayiv Branch of the Ukrainian Helsinki Union.
3. Kolosivskyi Valerii Yevhenovych - Head of the Zhytomyr District State Administration, Deputy Head of the Zhytomyr Branch of the Ukrainian Helsinki Union
4. Konon Vasyl Hryhorovych - former political prisoner, veteran of the national liberation movement (Ternopil region)
5. Kucheriv Ilko Ilkovych - Director of the Democratic Initiatives Foundation, co-founder of the People's Movement of Ukraine (Kyiv)
6. Lukyanenko Nadiya Ivanivna - activist of the Ivano-Frankivsk branch of the Ukrainian Helsinki Union
7. Markevich Yaroslav Volodymyrovych - President of the Kharkiv City Youth Association "Eastern Ukrainian Foundation for Democracy Development"
8. Nechiporenko Mykola Ivanovych - bandurist (Zhytomyr)
9. Oros Oleksandr Mykhailovych - Chairman of the Transcarpathian branch of the Ukrainian Helsinki Union
10. Pidpryhorschuk Vasyl Leontiiovych - activist of the Vinnytsia branch of the Ukrainian Helsinki Union
11. Sapelyak Stepan Yevstahiyovych - writer, chairman of the Kharkiv branch of the Ukrainian Helsinki Union
12. Sidyaga Vitaliy-Roman Tomkovych - Secretary of the Ternopil Branch of the Ukrainian Helsinki Union
13. Taran Lesya Yosypivna - Deputy Chairman of the Civil Society Development Fund, activist of the Lviv branch of the Ukrainian Helsinki Union
14. Dmytro Ivanovych Fedoriv is an activist of the Kyiv branch of the Ukrainian Helsinki Union
15. Chernyavska-Naboka Inna Borysivna - laboratory doctor of the central district polyclinic of Shevchenkivskyi district, activist of the Kyiv branch of the Ukrainian Helsinki Union.
16. Chornomaz Tetyana Oleksandrivna is the head of the Cherkasy branch of the Ukrainian Helsinki Union.
