= Prize of the Verkhovna Rada of Ukraine =

Ukrainian prize for science and technology

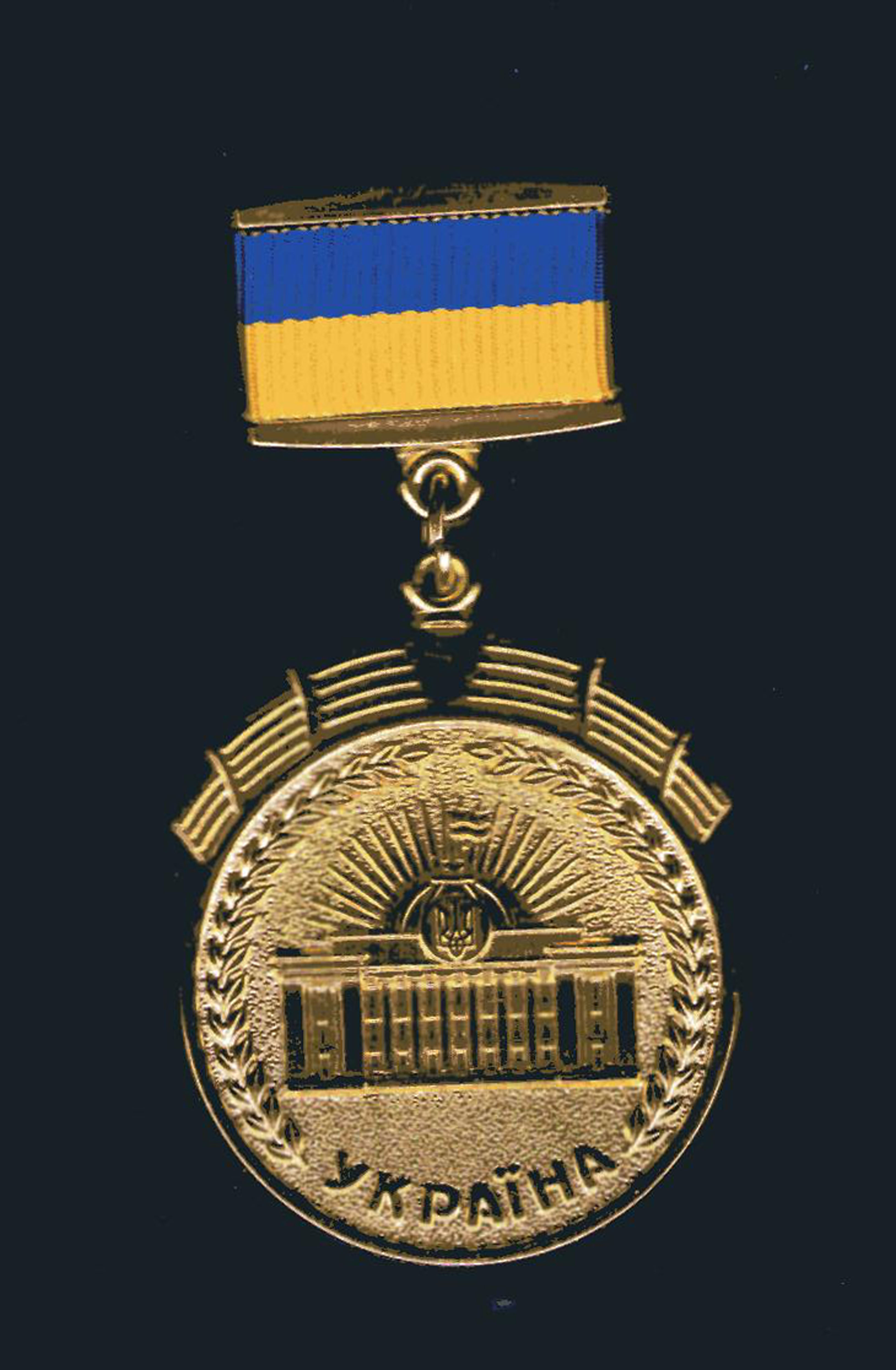
Badge of the Laureate of the Verkhovna Rada of Ukraine Prize for the most talented young scientists

The Prize of the Verkhovna Rada of Ukraine, for young scientists in the field of basic and applied research and scientific and technological research works, was established to promote domestic science and technology, increase the participation of young scientists in interdisciplinary basic and applied research and scientific development and increasing the prestige of the researcher. The award was established by the Verkhovna Rada of Ukraine in 2007.

Every year, since January 1, 2008, 20 Prizes of the Verkhovna Rada of Ukraine are awarded to young scientists. The awardees also receive a sum of ₴20 thousand each.

== Laureates ==
- Tetiana Ivanova
- Oleksandr Kolodiazhnyi
