= National Guard Military Academy of Ukraine =

- Національна академія Національної гвардії України
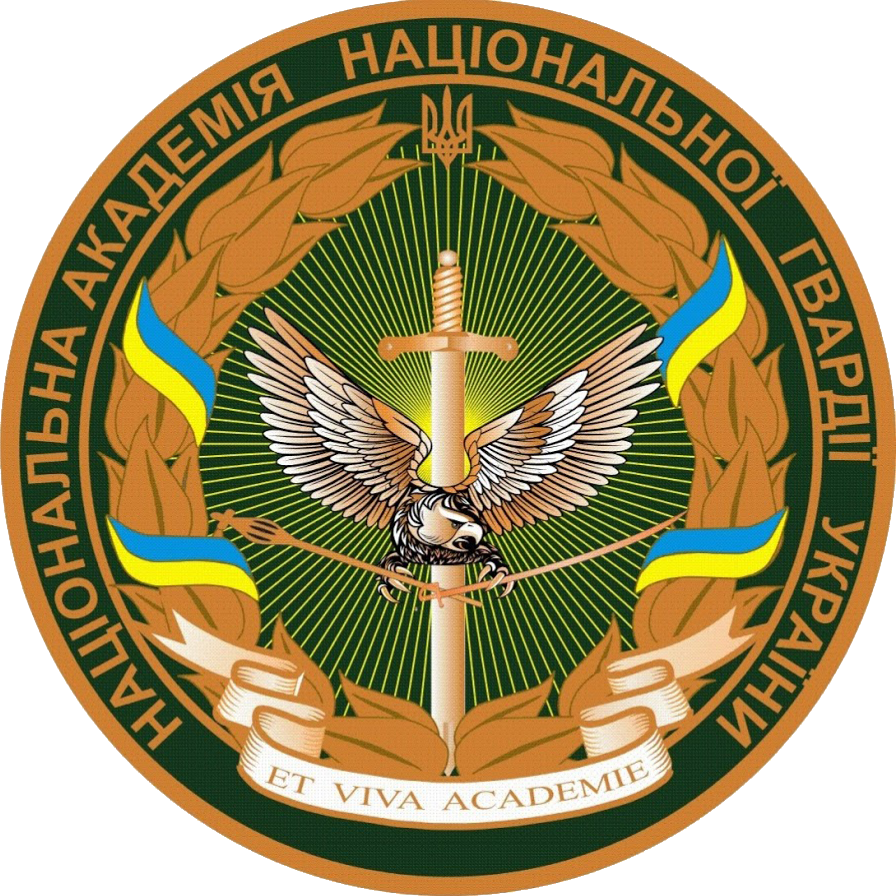
- Patch of the Academy
- Former names: Academy of Internal Troops of the Ministry of Internal Affairs of Ukraine
- Type: Police academy/Military academy
- Established: 1931; 95 years ago
- Founders: Soviet Government
- Affiliations: National Guard of Ukraine
- Students: 1500
- Location: Defenders of Ukraine Square, Kharkiv, Ukraine
- Language: Ukrainian language

The National Guard Military Academy of Ukraine (Ukrainian: Національна академія Національної гвардії України, romanized: Natsionalna akademiia Natsionalnoi hvardii Ukrainy) is an institution of the National Guard of Ukraine, located in Kharkiv. It is the successor to the former Academy of Internal Troops of the Ministry of Internal Affairs of Ukraine. Officers and NCOs of the NGU are trained under the aegis of the National Guard Military Academy.

== History ==
On 26 December 1931, the Second School of Border Guard and Internal Troops (later the Second United Border School) was founded in Pomirky. On 16 April 1932, its staff was awarded the Battle Flag. On 1 May 1932, the cadets of the first set took part in the May Day military parade of the Kharkiv Garrison for the first time. On October Revolution Day of that year, the first graduation of junior commanders took place. In April 1937, the school became known as the Kharkiv Military School of the NKVD named after Felix Dzerzhinsky. It would later come under the command of the Soviet Internal Troops. In September 1946, the first postwar graduation of rear service officers took place. In 1959, the school was relocated within Kharkiv to Uprising Square. In 1975, the school was completely transferred to the training of cadets under the program of higher military education and became known as the Kharkiv Higher Military School of the Rear of the Ministry of Internal Affairs of the USSR.

On 2 January 1992, the Kharkiv Higher Military School of the National Guard of Ukraine was established, changed in 1995 and the by order of the Ministry of Education of Ukraine to the Military Institute of the National Guard. It was converted into an academy for the Internal Troops during the Yuschenko presidency.

On 27 May 2014, in connection with the reform of the Ukrainian security services, the National Guard Academy was recreated. On 4 June 2014, by the decree of the acting President of Ukraine Oleksandr Turchynov, the academy became known as the "national academy" of the National Guard.

== Training ==
It provides initial and advanced training to the officers of the National Guard of Ukraine. National Academy of the National Guard of Ukraine provides the following training: bachelor's degree (4 years), master's degree (5.5 years-long training), and the advanced officers training course (2 years). Since the Annexation of Crimea by the Russian Federation, the academy has become the main site for conducting all the NATO trainings in the Eastern region of the country.

== Faculty ==
Faculties:

- Faculty No. 1 "Command and Staff"
- Faculty No. 2 "Engineering and Technical"
- Faculty No. 3 "Economics and Management"
- Faculty No. 4 "Humanitarian"

The majority of the faculty of the National Academy of the NGU took part in the Anti-Terrorist Operation Zone (ATO) and/or the Joint Forces Operation (JFO).

== Sports ==
In the park, next to the academy, there is a sports complex with an area of 1.2 hectares, which houses a gym, equipped with 250 and 100 - meter treadmills and installed 30 park simulators. This sports town serves as a base for classes and sports competitions with officers and cadets of the academy. The hand-to-hand combat hall provides an opportunity to engage in oriental martial arts. This sports equipment is resistant to weather conditions and is made by the servicemen of the Department of Physical Training and the training and production workshop of the Academy. The best athletes of the Academy have always worthily represented the educational institution at various competitions of the city of Kharkiv, the regional and republican councils of FST "Dynamo". The cadets of the Academy have also repeatedly become champions and winners of world championships, European and other international competitions.

== Rectors ==
- Stepan Poltorak (March 2002 - February 28, 2014)
- Volodymyr Penkov (since February 28, 2014)

== See also ==
- Academy of the Ministry of Internal Affairs of Tajikistan
- Ministry of the Interior Academy of the Republic of Belarus
