= Order of Danylo Halytsky =

Military award of Ukraine

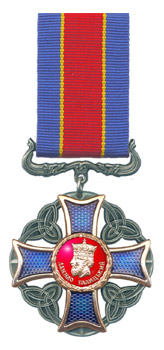
- Badge of the Order of Danylo Halytsky
- Type: Single-grade order
- Presented by: Ukraine
- Status: Active
- Established: February 20, 2003
- First award: August 22, 2003
- Ribbon bar of the Order of Danylo Halytsky

Precedence
- Next (higher): Order of Princess Olga
- Next (lower): Cross of Ivan Mazepa

The Order of Danylo Halytsky (Ukrainian: Орден Данила Галицького, romanized: Orden Danyla Halytskoho) is an award of Ukraine. The Order was instituted on February 20, 2003, by the Verkhovna Rada of Ukraine to honour the military men of the Armed Forces of Ukraine and other military formations created in compliance with the laws of Ukraine, as well as public servants for significant personal contribution in the building of Ukraine, thorough and faultless service to the Ukrainian people.

== Medals and ribbons ==
Awards to serving members of the armed forces bear crossed swords.

| For civilians | For military |
Ribbon
