= Medal "For Military Service to Ukraine" =

Ukrainian military decoration

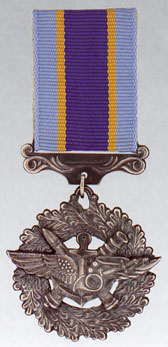
- Medal "For Military Service to Ukraine"
- Type: Single-grade medal
- Presented by: Ukraine
- Status: Active
- Established: October 5, 1996
- First award: December 4, 1996
- Ribbon bar of the Medal "For Military Service to Ukraine"

Precedence
- Next (higher): Order For Brave Miners' Work
- Next (lower): Medal "For Irreproachable Service"

The Medal "For Military Service to Ukraine" (Ukrainian: Медаль «За військову службу Україні») is an award of Ukraine. It was established by the Decree of the President of Ukraine Leonid Kuchma on October 5, 1996, to honour servicemen of the Armed Forces of Ukraine and other military formations created in accordance with the Ukrainian legislature and other individuals for courage and valor displayed at protection of state interests and for excellent execution of service duty.

The medal can be awarded to foreign citizens or individuals without citizenship, and can be awarded posthumously.

The medal is awarded:

- for personal courage and valor, devoted actions displayed at protection of state interests for reaching a high level of troops’ combat readiness and assuring Ukraine's defense capability;
- for excellent execution of military duty;
- for execution of special tasks to assure the state security of Ukraine;
- for 25 years of perfect military service.

The medal is made of silver.

== History of the award ==
On October 5, 1996, the Decree of the President of Ukraine Kuchma No. 931/96 established the award of the President of Ukraine – the medal "For Military Service of Ukraine". The decree also approved the Regulations on the award and description of the medal. On the same day, the award of the President of Ukraine – the medal "For Impeccable Service" was established.

On March 16, 2000, the Verkhovna Rada of Ukraine adopted the Law of Ukraine "On State Awards of Ukraine", which established the state award of Ukraine – the medal "For Military Service of Ukraine". It was established that the effect of this Law extends to legal relations related to the awarding of persons awarded honors of the President of Ukraine before the entry into force of this Law; recommended to the President of Ukraine to bring his decrees in line with this Law.

== Regulations on the medal ==
The medal "For Military Service of Ukraine" is awarded:

- for personal courage and bravery, selfless actions shown in protection of the state interests of Ukraine;
- for achieving high combat readiness of troops and ensuring the defense capability of Ukraine;
- for exemplary military service;
- for performing special tasks to ensure the state security of Ukraine;
- for merits in protection of the state border of Ukraine;
- for 25 years of impeccable military service.

The medal "For Military Service of Ukraine" can be awarded to foreign citizens and stateless persons, and can be awarded posthumously. It is awarded by the President of Ukraine or on his authority by the head of the relevant ministry.

The President of Ukraine may be deprived of the medal "For Military Service of Ukraine".

Duplicates of the medal "For Military Service of Ukraine" and certificates to it are issued in accordance with the decision of the Commission on State Awards and Heraldry under the President of Ukraine at the expense of the recipient or free of charge.

== Description of the medal ==
The medal is made of silver and has the shape of a wreath of oak leaves. A composition with the image of military weapons and symbols (rocket, cannon, saber, battle antimony, flags, etc.) is superimposed on the wreath. All images are embossed. The diameter of the wreath is 40 mm.

The reverse side of the medal is flat, with a relief number.

The wreath is connected with a ring with an eyelet with a rectangular block covered with a ribbon. The lower part of the pad is shaped. Pad size: length – 45 mm, width – 28 mm. On the back of the pad – a clasp for attaching the medal to clothing.

The ribbon of the medal is silk moire, blue with a blue stripe in the middle and two yellow on the sides. The width of the tape is 28 mm. Width of strips: blue – 12 mm, yellow – 2 mm.

The medal bar is a rectangular metal plate covered with a ribbon. The size of a lath: length – 12 mm, width – 24 mm.

== Sequence of placement of signs of state awards of Ukraine ==
The Medal "For Military Service of Ukraine" is placed on the left side of the chest after the badge of the Order "For Valiant Mining" I, II, III degrees.
