= Warrior of Light =

Annual literary award in Ukraine and Belarus

Warrior of Light (Ukrainian: Воїн світла; Belarusian: Воін Сьвятла) is an International Ukrainian-Belarusian Mikhail Zhyzneuski Memorial Award. Zhyzneuski was a Euromaidan activist and journalist, a member of the Self-Defense Maidan, Chevalier of the Order of Heavenly Hundred Heroes. It was founded in August 2015 based on the results of the International Ukrainian-Belarusian seminar held on July 1–2, 2015 in the Writer's Union of Ukraine. The prize is awarded annually "for the book of Ukrainian or Belarusian author, which as a noble, brave hero who fights for justice, preaches high human values, and is an example for others to follow." The laureates are awarded a diploma, cash prize, and Warrior of Light statuette with an inscription. The inaugural presentation went to Bogdan Zholdak for his novel "Ukry" (Ukrainian: Укры) and Belarusian writer Anatol' Barouski for the book "Chosen will" (Belarusian: Воляй абраны).

== Description ==
Warrior of Light (Ukrainian: Воїн світла; Belarusian: Воін Сьвятла) is an International Ukrainian-Belarusian Mikhail Zhyzneuski Memorial Award. Zhyzneuski was a Euromaidan activist and journalist, a member of the Self-Defense Maidan, Chevalier of the Order of Heavenly Hundred Heroes. The prize is awarded annually "for the book of Ukrainian or Belarusian author, which as a noble, brave hero who fights for justice, preaches high human values, and is an example for others to follow." The laureate is awarded a diploma, cash prize, and Warrior of Light statuette with an inscription.

== History ==
The prize was founded in August 2015 based on the results of the International Ukrainian-Belarusian seminar held on July 1–2, 2015 in the Writer's Union of Ukraine. Belarusian participants noted that Ukraine is for Belarusians new geopolitical center that will help Belarus to survive in conditions of total Russification and the attack of the Russian world. According to the organizers, the competition involved writers from Belarus and Ukraine, with one winner from each country.

On January 26, 2016 in Kyiv, the Warrior of Light prizes were handed out for the best Ukrainian and Belarusian prose books that advocate freedom, justice, and human ideals. Chairman of the Kyiv city organization of the Writer's Union of Ukraine, Vladimir Danilenko, during the presentation of the literary award said:

The award is given on the birthday of Michail Zhyzneuski and is dedicated to him. In this year of Ukraine laureate, by a decision of the jury became Bogdan Zholdak for his novel about the Russian-Ukrainian war "Ukry" (Ukrainian: Укры), and Belarusian writer Anatol' Barouski for the book "Chosen will" (Belarusian: Воляй абраны) on the national liberation struggle of the Belarusian people against the Russian Empire in 1863–1864 years.

Danilenko noted that this year's presentation is the debut of the award, but the organizers are planning to make such an award every year in Ukraine and revive the direction of chivalry.

The Ukrainian winner Bohdan Zholdak said during the presentation ceremony that his novel is devoted to the real history of the deceased Anti-Terrorist Operation fighters:

The main idea of my book is to show a great injustice to the ATO fighters. The book is dedicated to the person who had wounded, had awards, the museum has its exposition, and the mother of the deceased do not give up now certificate that was an ATO fighter... The story written on a true story on real events and is dedicated to the hero, who died when he it was 18 years old. He was killed during the night on the train and thrown out of the railway carriage. Decisive is, and what the guy added himself an age to get in ATO.

The Belarusian winner Anatol' Barouski said he was glad to receiving the award, and expressed hope that the Ukrainian people will win in the struggle for freedom:

If we talk about my novel about Kalinowski, there continued the way to your margins... I am very pleased to be among you, among the Ukrainian people, and especially in these memorable places, which affected not only Ukraine but the whole globe. Strive to his will, so Zhyznevski died for Ukraine and for Belarus... I think we will win. First you, and we after you.

== See also ==
- Kobzar Literary Award
- List of literary awards
- List of poetry awards
- Shevchenko National Prize
- Vasyl Stus Prize

== Literature ==
- Алла Миколаєнко. «Воїн Світла»: Під цією назвою засновано українсько-білоруську премію пам'яті Михайла Жизневського // Літературна Україна. — 2015. — No. 26 (16 лип.). — С. 3 — (Наша спілка). (in Ukrainian)
