= Maidan casualties =

Casualties of the 2014 Ukrainian revolution

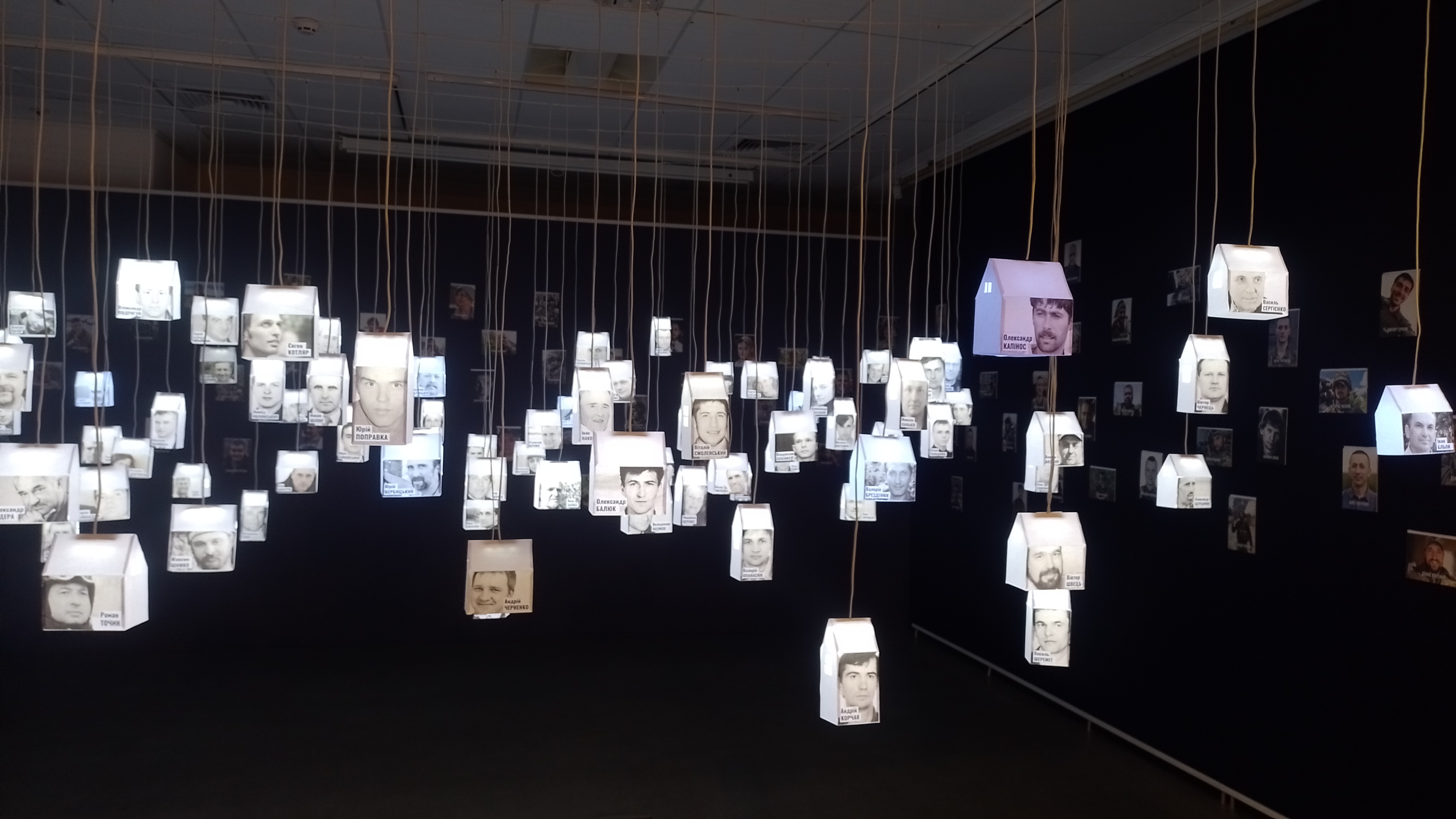
Faces of deceased protestors in an exhibition at the Kyiv History Museum

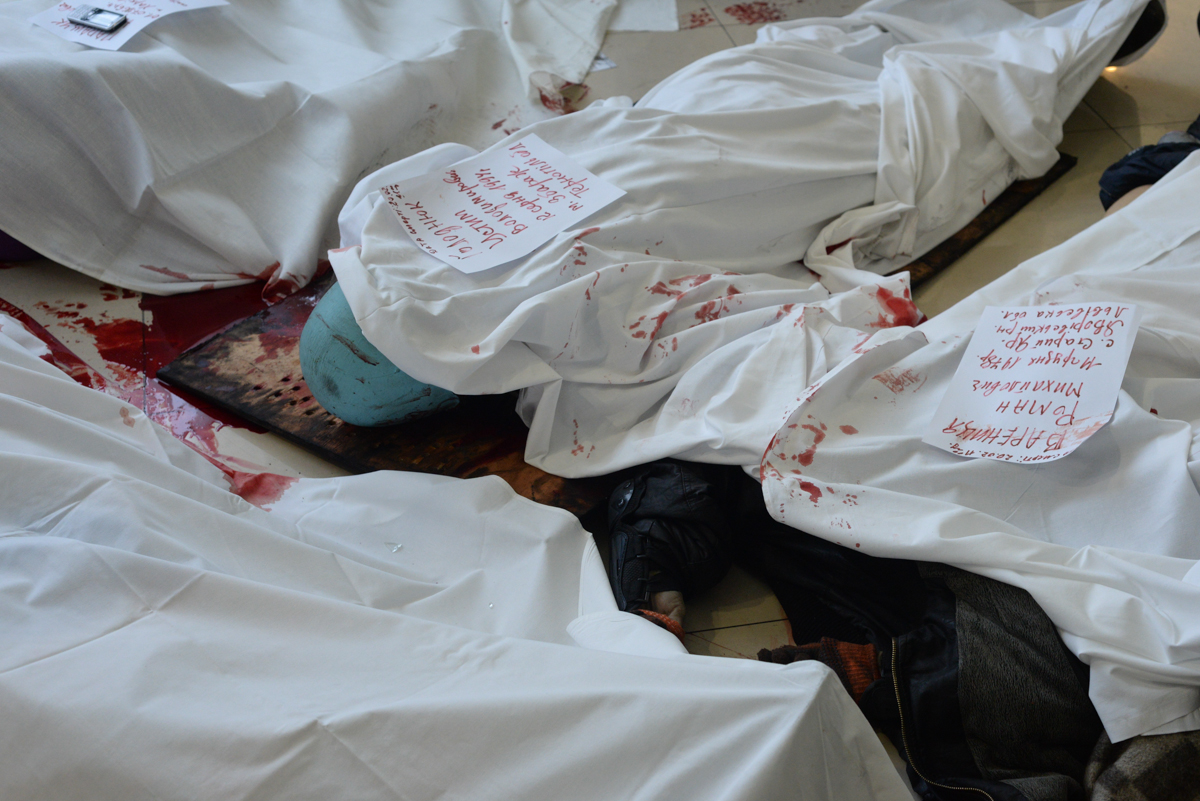
Bodies of protesters Yuriy Parashchuk, Ustym Holodnyuk and Roman Varenitsya in Hotel Ukraine

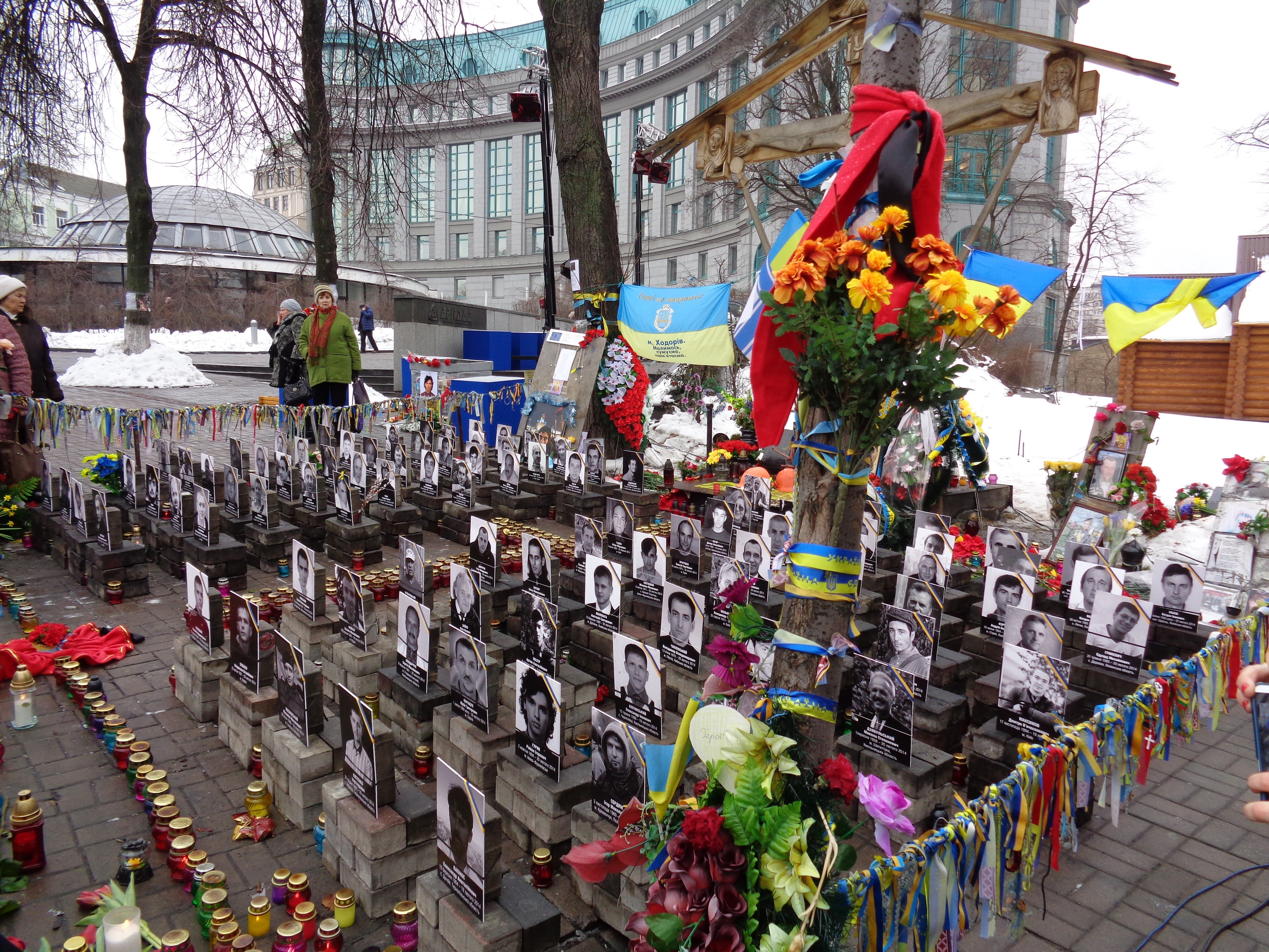
Memorial to protesters killed in the Maidan massacre in Kyiv

In Ukraine's Revolution of Dignity (or the 'Maidan Revolution'), which was the culmination of the Euromaidan protest movement, 108 civilian protesters and 13 police officers were killed. The deaths occurred in January and February 2014; most of them on 20 February, when police snipers fired on anti-government activists in Kyiv. The slain activists are known in Ukraine as the Heavenly Hundred or Heavenly Company (Ukrainian: Небесна сотня, romanized: Nebesna sotnia). By June 2016, 55 people had been charged in relation to the deaths of protesters, including 29 former members of the Berkut special police force, ten titushky or loyalists of the former government, and ten former government officials.

On 21 February, the Ukrainian parliament (Verkhovna Rada) passed a law to provide assistance to the families of the protesters who were killed. On 21 November 2014 a decree by the new Ukrainian president Petro Poroshenko posthumously awarded the title Hero of Ukraine to the slain protesters. Three non-Ukrainian citizens killed in the revolution were each posthumously awarded the title Knight of the Order of the Heaven's Hundred Heroes. Since 2015, the deaths have been commemorated each year in Ukraine on 20 February, which is "the Day of the Heavenly Hundred Heroes".

== History ==
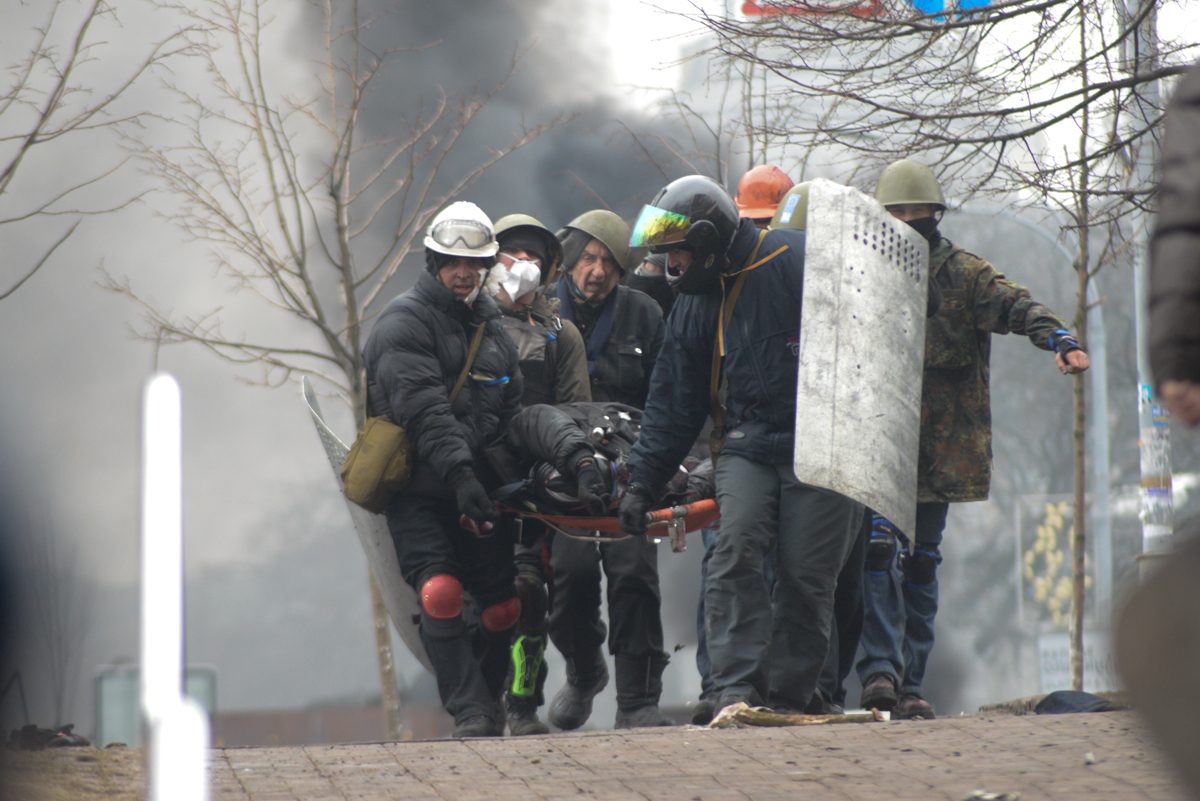
Protesters carrying the wounded

The first deaths occurred on Unity Day, 22 January, during riots on Hrushevskoho Street in Kyiv, where three activists: Serhiy Nigoyan, Mykhailo Zhyznevskyi and Roman Senyk were shot dead by security forces. On the same day, the dead body of activist Yuriy Verbytsky was found on the city outskirts; he had been kidnapped a day before with Ihor Lutsenko, who was released. These were the first victims to die in demonstrations in Ukraine since it gained national independence in 1991. The deaths caused widespread protests. On 23 January, then Prime Minister Mykola Azarov in a BBC interview said that police had not been issued firearms, and said no police officers were located on the rooftops around the protest area. He stated that the shooting of protesters was a provocation by extremist forces aimed at escalating violence. Party of Regions MP Arsen Klinchayev stated during a memorial service in Luhansk for those killed on 22 January by police, "These people were against the government. Nobody has the right to use physical force against police officers. And then they have their sticks, then stones, then something else. The police have the right to defend their lives. So I think it's right that these four people were killed. Moreover, I believe that you need to be stricter."

On 18 February, protesters attempted to march from Independence Square to the parliament building, to urge politicians to vote for constitutional amendments. Clashes broke out as their path was blocked by riot police, who tried to push them back to Maidan. Eleven protesters were killed or fatally wounded. Three of them were shot dead by police; the rest died of other injuries. Four police officers were also shot and killed.

Later that evening and into the early hours of 19 February, the security forces launched an operation to clear Independence Square. Small groups of titushky (government loyalists) also gathered nearby. Clashes broke out between the security forces and protesters, resulting in the deaths of seventeen protesters and five police officers. Most of the protesters were shot by police. Two others died when police set the Trade Union building on fire, and another was found dead with his throat slit. A journalist, Viacheslav Veremii, was beaten and shot dead by titushky for filming them. The five police officers died from gunshot wounds.

On the morning of 20 February, riot police massed at the edge of the Maidan camp on Independence Square. At around 9am, two Berkut officers were shot dead. Around the same time, protesters tried to push the security forces away from the Maidan and back up Instytutska Street. The security forces fired indiscriminately on the protesters from ground level, while snipers fired on protesters from above. By midday, 48 protesters had been shot dead on Instytutska Street, as had two other police officers. According to the newspaper Ukrainska Pravda, special forces (Berkut) and Internal Troops snipers shot at people on Maidan and/or snipers located in nearby buildings, with the special forces firing AK-47 assault rifles. 20 February was the bloodiest day of the clashes, with at least 21 protesters killed.

The final death toll from these clashes in late February was 103 protesters and 13 police. According to Deputy Prosecutor General of Ukraine Oleh Zalisko in February, 184 people sustained gunshot wounds in Kyiv and over 750 suffered bodily injury. On 20 February, the (then) opposition parties (Batkivshchyna, UDAR and Svoboda) stated "To hold talks with the regime, the policies of which led to the deaths of many people, is an extremely unpleasant thing but we must do everything possible and even the impossible to prevent further bloodshed".

On 21 February, the Maidan held a memorial for the slain protesters who they named the Heavenly Hundred. During the event, a mourning Lemko song "A Duckling Swims in the Tysa" was heard (Ukrainian: « Пливе́ ка́ча по Тиси́ні…»).

On 24 February, the Verkhovna Rada (Ukraine's parliament) decided to propose that the next Ukrainian president award the title Hero of Ukraine to protesters killed in the clashes.

== Identity of 20 February snipers ==
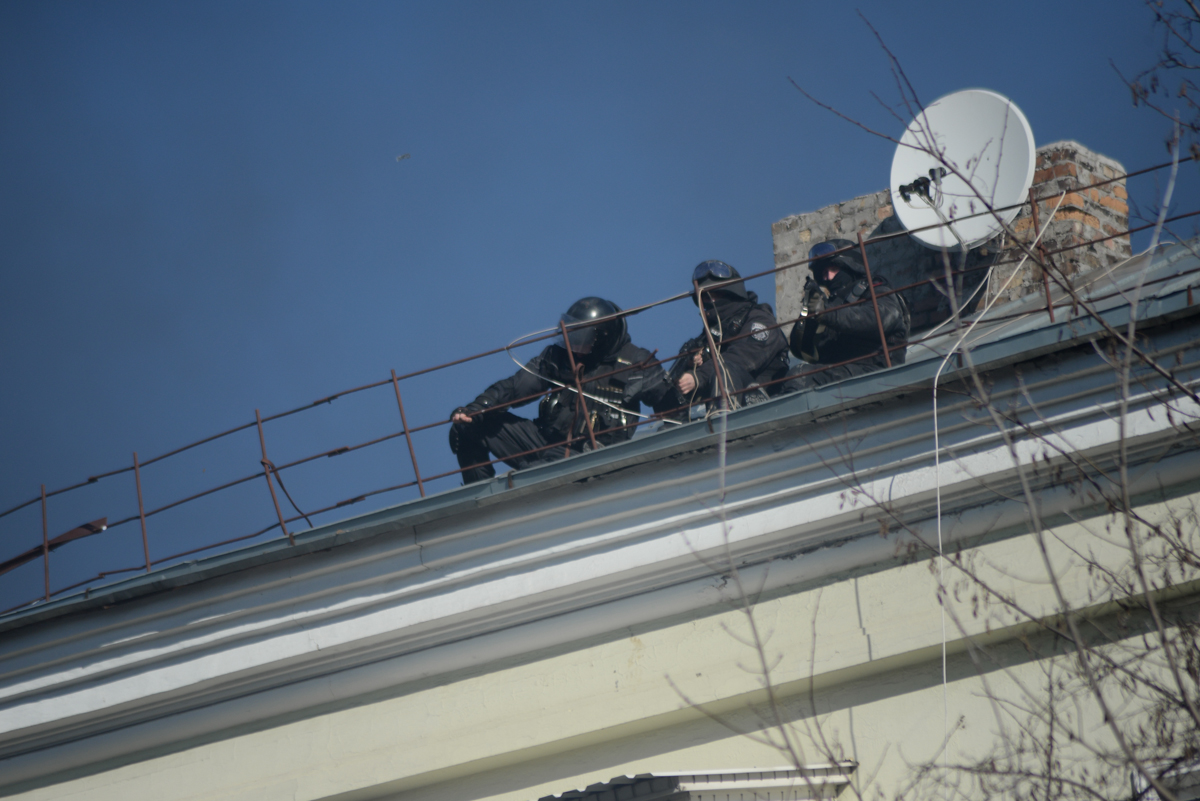
Snipers on a roof during clashes in Kyiv, 18 February 2014, Instytutska st.

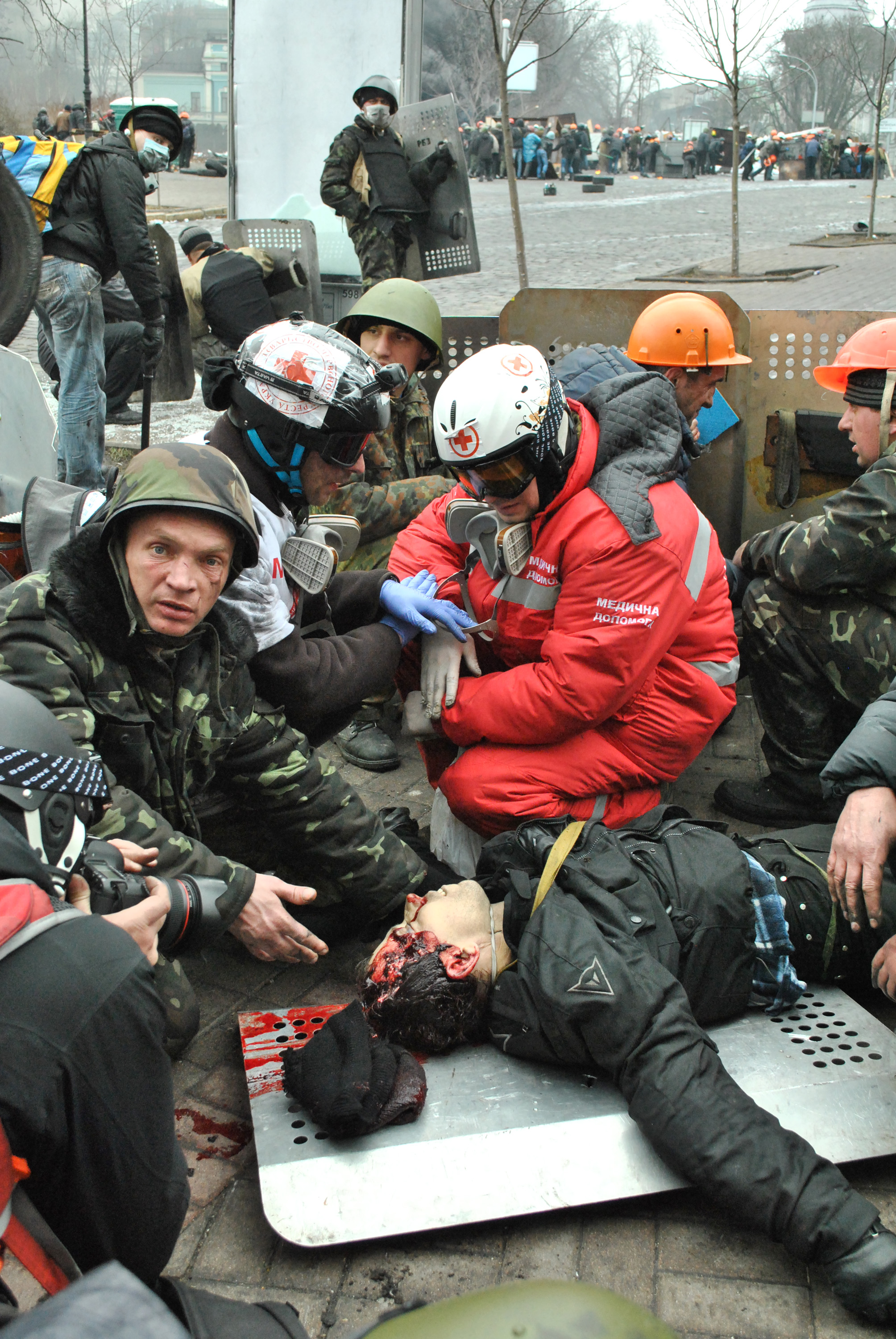
Ihor Tkachuk, one of the victims of the 20 February snipers

In June 2016, the Prosecutor General of Ukraine announced that forensic examinations had matched bullets removed from the victims' bodies with the assault rifles of the Berkut. In the years since the revolution, the Office of the Prosecutor General has identified 27 Berkut officers involved in the 20 February shootings of protesters. However, in most cases, investigators have been unable to identify which Berkut officer shot specific protesters.

In the immediate aftermath of the revolution, the new government's health minister, Oleh Musiy—a doctor who helped oversee medical treatment for casualties during the protests—told the Associated Press that the similarity of the bullet wounds suffered by both protesters and police suggested the shooters were trying to stoke tensions on both sides and spark greater violence, with the goal of justifying a Russian invasion. "I think it wasn't just a part of the old regime that (plotted the provocation), but it was also the work of Russian special forces who served and maintained the ideology of the (old) regime," he said, citing forensic evidence. Hennadiy Moskal, former deputy head of the Security Service of Ukraine and Ministry of Internal Affairs, suggested that snipers from the Security Service and Militsiya were responsible, acting on contingency plans dating back to Soviet times: "Snipers received orders to shoot not only protesters, but also police forces. This was all done to escalate the conflict, to justify the police operation to clear Maidan". The new Interior Minister, Arsen Avakov, said in March 2014 that the shootings were provoked by a 'non-Ukrainian' third party, and that an investigation was ongoing.

Russian state media reported in March 2014 a leaked telephone call in which Estonia's foreign minister, Urmas Paet, allegedly accused the opposition of shooting both police and protesters. Paet acknowledged the phone call was authentic, but denied blaming the opposition and said he was merely relaying rumors he had heard from a doctor. A spokesperson for the US state department said the leak was "Russian tradecraft". The doctor, Olga Bogomolets, said she had not told Paet that policemen and protesters had been killed in the same way, that she did not blame the opposition for the killings, and said the government told her an investigation had begun.

In April 2014, Ukraine's new interior minister, Avakov, presented the findings of the initial investigation into the shootings. It found the Berkut responsible for shooting the protesters, and identified twelve of the officers involved. It also identified some of the firing positions. Avakov said the previous regime had tried to hinder any inquiry by destroying weapons, uniforms and documents. The investigation also found that more than 30 Russian Federal Security Bureau (FSB) agents were involved in the crackdown on protesters. Valentyn Nalyvaichenko, the interim head of Ukraine's Security Service, said the FSB agents had flown large quantities of explosives into an airport near Kyiv, that they were based at a compound in Kyiv throughout the Maidan protests, were provided with "state telecommunications", and were in regular contact with Yanukovych's security officials. He said that Yanukovych's SBU chief Oleksandr Yakymenko, who had fled the country, held several briefings with the agents. Russia's FSB rejected this as "groundless accusations".

On 31 March 2014, The Daily Beast published photos and videos which appear to show that some of the snipers were members of the Ukrainian Security Service's "Alfa" group, who had been trained in Russia.

In 2015, BBC published a story based on an interview with an unnamed man, who said he fired at riot police from the Kyiv Conservatory (music academy) on the morning of 20 February. The sniper said he was recruited by "a retired military officer". These morning shots are said to have provoked return fire from police snipers that resulted in many deaths. One Maidan leader, Andriy Shevchenko, said police commanders called him to say they were being shot from areas controlled by protesters. Another Maidan leader, Andriy Parubiy, said his team searched the Conservatory but found no snipers. He confirmed that many victims on both sides were shot by snipers, but they were shooting from other, taller buildings surrounding the Conservatory and was convinced they were snipers controlled by Russia. In 2016, Maidan protester Ivan Bubenchik admitted having fired on the security forces from the Conservatory on 20 February, killing two Berkut commanders. He said he acted in response to the Berkut shooting at protesters.

=== Arrests and prosecutions ===
On 2 April 2014, law enforcement authorities announced they had detained nine officers of the Kyiv City Berkut unit as suspects in the shootings, and verified the Alfa Group's involvement. Officials also said they planned further arrests, but had been hindered because the Yanukovych regime destroyed documents and evidence. The Ministry of Internal Affairs confirmed that Yanukovych gave the order to fire on protesters on 20 February.

Many of the identified alleged perpetrators fled to Russia after the revolution. According to the Prosecutor General's Office, the Russian Federation granted citizenship to 18 police officers suspected of killing protesters, and has refused to extradite them to Ukraine. President Volodymyr Zelenskyy said in 2020 that prosecutions were difficult because "evidence and documents have been lost, while the scene of the crime has been tampered with and 'cleaned up'". He could not say when those who gave the orders would be found, but gave assurances that the matter is being "dealt with faster than several years ago". Later in 2020, an investigation by the Ukrainian Bureau of Investigations concluded that the assault on the Maidan protesters was ordered by Yanukovych and his subordinates.

In 2023, a Ukrainian court convicted three former Berkut police officers in absentia for their part in the killings. The three were in hiding in Russia. Oleh Yanishevsky, a deputy commander of a Berkut regiment, received life imprisonment for murder, while the two others were sentenced to 15 years each for murder. The court ruled that at least 40 of the 48 protesters were killed by the Berkut. In the remaining eight cases, the perpetrators could not be determined due to lack of evidence. According to the Kyiv Independent:

In many cases, it was impossible to identify which Berkut officer shot specific protesters because they wore face masks or their images in photographs and video footage were of poor quality. ... the court effectively considered the officers' actions individually rather than collectively, thus dropping murder charges where it was impossible to prove which officer killed which protester

== Identified deaths ==
Nationality	Name	Details	Date of death	Cause of death/Reference
(Ukraine)	Yuriy Verbytskyi	Seismologist from the Geophysical Institute in Lviv. Member of Lviv's climber society. After his death, the society proposed to name one of the Caucasian mountains after Verbytskyi—the idea was supported by the Georgian climber society, which is currently looking for an unnamed peak.	21 or 22 January	Verbytskyi was kidnapped from the Oleksandivsky Hospital together with Ihor Lutsenko on 21 January. His body was found on 22 January close to the village of Hnidyn in Boryspil Raion, with signs of torture. However, the official cause of death was hypothermia.
(Ukraine)	Pavlo Mazurenko	Participated in Euromaidan	21 December 2013	According to his wife, as reported by Ukrayinska Pravda, Pavlo Mazurenko (41 years old) was beaten up on 18 December 2013 by three law enforcement agents in Borshchahivka (Mykilska). According to police, he died as a result of a fight with employees of a private security company who were guarding the Colibris store in Kyiv. Police claimed that Maruenko's wife stated he was not involved in protests. Ukrainian UNIAN News Agency interviewed his wife days after, and she commented her husband was beaten by "three men in black uniform and batons [...] more resembling interior ministry servicemen, or a private security company staff". She claimed that the three ran away after beating him. On 21 December, he visited a doctor who sent him to a hospital where he was diagnosed with a concussion. The day he was hospitalized doctors found fractures to his skull. On 22 December, Mazurenko died and his body was sent for forensic examination, after which he was diagnosed with two-way contagious bovine pleuropneumonia (lung plaque seen in bovine animals).
(Ukraine)	Serhiy Nigoyan	Born in the village of Bereznuvativka in Dnipropetrovsk Oblast. The Nigoyan family moved from Armenia to Ukraine as refugees of the first Nagorno-Karabakh War. Nigoyan came to Euromaidan on 8 December and was mostly involved in security.	22 January	He died on 22 January during clashes on Hrushevskoho Street. He suffered multiple gunshot wounds during a Berkut attack on the barricades. On 18 November 2015, according to the head of the Special Investigations Unit, Nigoyan was killed at a distance of not less than three meters, while the security team of the protesters was at a distance of about 30 meters.
(Belarus)	Mykhailo Zhyznevskyi	Zhyznevskyi left Belarus for political reasons. In Ukraine, he lived in Kyiv and later Bila Tserkva. Was a member of the Ukrainian nationalist group, the UNSO. At Euromaidan, Zhyznevskyi was involved in security.	22 January	He died on 22 January during Berkut's action on barricades on Hrushevskoho Street. He was shot in the chest by a sniper. His funeral was attended by Euromaidan and opposition leaders; he was buried with the Ukrainian UNA-UNSO and Belarusian flags.
(Ukraine)	Roman Senyk	Senyk was born in Lviv Oblast and lived in Turka.	25 January	During a Berkut action on barricades on Hrushevskoho Street, a grenade tore his hand and left multiple wounds in his lower chest and lungs. Hit with a metal bullet in the lung, he underwent several operations and had to have his arm amputated. After losing more than 3.5 litres of blood, he died in hospital after multiple surgeries.
(Ukraine)	Bohdan Kalyniak	52 years old from Kolomyia, Ivano-Frankivsk Oblast	28 January	He died at a hospital in Ivano-Frankivsk on 28 January. Kolomyia Mayor Igor Sluzar said the man had come down with pneumonia during the clashes on Hrushevskoho Street where police used water cannons on protesters despite sub-zero temperatures.
(Ukraine)	Serhiy Synenko	AutoMaidan activist. Zaporizhzhia.	13 February	In Zaporizhzhia, the gas tank of his car was shot at, causing it to explode and the car to engulf him in flames. Police stated the murder may have been motivated by his participation in Automaidan.
(Ukraine)	Serhiy Bondarev	Software engineer from GlobalLogic, Kyiv. Originally from Kramatorsk, Donetsk region	18 February	4 gunshot wounds
(Ukraine)	Valeriy Brezdenyuk	Painter, known for "paintings on the water". From Zhmerynka, Vinnytsia Oblast. 50 years old.	18 February	Killed during clashes by a gunshot wound to the back.
(Ukraine)	Serhiy Didych	Svoboda member. 44 years old.	18 February	He died during a traffic incident while another protester was trying to break the police line.
(Ukraine)	Antonina Dvoryanets	From Brovary. Kyiv Oblast. 61 years old.	18 February	She was picketing on Instytutska Street. Beaten to death with clubs during clashes.
(Ukraine)	Oleksandr Kapinos	From Ternopil Oblast, Svoboda member, 29 years old.	18 February	He was killed during clashes. According to his friend, Oleksandr was hit by a grenade, then shot in the head with a rubber bullet at close range. Died in hospital.
(Georgia (country))	Zurab Khurtsia	Georgian, 53 years old.	18 February	Died from a heart attack on Maidan.
(Ukraine)	Volodymyr Kishchuk	From Zaporizhzhia Oblast. 58 years old.	18 February	Shot during clashes with riot police and Berkut on Hrushevskoho street.
(Ukraine)	Andriy Korchak	Boryslav. Lviv Oblast 50 years old.	18 February	Beaten by "Berkut" and died from a head injury in the hospital.
(Ukraine)	Volodymyr Kulchytskyi	From Kyiv. 65 years old.	18 February	Killed by two bullets during clashes.
(Ukraine)	Volodymyr Naumov	Member of Euromaidan self-defense units, from Donetsk Oblast.	18 February	Body found on Trukhaniv Island near the Dnieper River. Police accused Naumov of suicide.
(Ukraine)	Oleksandr Plekhanov	22 year-old college student from Kyiv.	18 February	Killed during clashes.
(Ukraine)	Ihor Serdyuk	From Kremenchuk. 40 years old.	18 February	Executed by "titushkas" thugs and "Berkut" next to Mariinskyi Park, while building a barricade.
(Ukraine)	Serhiy Shapoval	From Kyiv. 45 years old.	18 February	Shot during clashes with the riot police and Berkut on Hrushevskoho street.
(Ukraine)	Vyacheslav Veremiy	Journalist for Vesti newspaper; lost 1 eye during the Hrushevskoho Street riots weeks prior; survived by a 4-year-old son.	18 February	Pulled out of a taxi on his way home from work and then shot in the chest by government-paid thugs in a targeted killing. Driver was severely beaten with lacerations to his legs.
(Ukraine)	Yakiv Zaiko	Former People's Deputy of Ukraine, Zhytomyr. 73 years old.	18 February	Died from heart attack while fleeing "Berkut" special unit.
(Ukraine)	Andriy Chernenko	Slobodo-Petrivka, Poltava Oblast, 35 years old. Survived by 7-month-old daughter.	19 February	
(Ukraine)	Yuriy Paskhalin	From Cherkasy Oblast. 30 years old.	19 February	3 gunshot wounds in the back and 1 pneumatic injury
(Ukraine)	Dmytro Maksymov	From Kyiv, 19 years old.	18 February	Injured by a grenade explosion, lost an arm, died of blood loss.
(Ukraine)	Vitaliy Vasyltsov	from Bila Tserkva. Born in 1977.	19 February	Shot on Velyka Zhytomyrska Street.
(Ukraine)	Serhiy Baidovsky	from Lutsk, originally from Novovolynsk. 22 years old.	20 February	Killed on Independence Square
(Ukraine)	Serhiy Bondarchuk	from Starokostiantyniv. Born in 1961. Teacher of Physics.	20 February	Killed by sniper
(Ukraine)	Mykola Dziavulsky	Born in Krasnoyarsk Krai, Russia. Lived in Shepetivka, Khmelnytskyi Oblast. Born in 1958. Teacher of geography and biology	20 February	Killed by sniper on Instytutska Street.
(Ukraine)	Ustym Holodnyuk	from Zbarazh, Ternopil Oblast, born in 1994 (19 years old)	20 February	Shot in the head by sniper
(Ukraine)	Eduard Hrynevych	Volyn Oblast, born in 1985 (28 years old)	20 February	Shot in the head by a sniper. Brought to St. Michael's Golden-Domed Monastery
(Ukraine)	Serhiy Kemsky	From Kerch, Crimea. 34 years old.	20 February	Brought to St. Michael's Golden-Domed Monastery
(Ukraine)	Ihor Kostenko	Journalist from the newspaper Sportanalytic, geography student and contributor to Ukrainian Wikipedia from Buchach, Ternopil Oblast. 22 years old	20 February	Brought to St. Michael's Golden-Domed Monastery
(Ukraine)	Ivan Kreman (Panteleyev)	From Kremenchuk, Poltava Oblast	20 February	Killed by sniper
(Ukraine)	Andrii Movchan	from Kyiv. 34 years old. Democratic Alliance activist	20 February	Killed by sniper. According to a friend, Andrii was bringing food to Maidan when he was killed.
(Ukraine)	Roman Nikulichev	Kyiv, 21 years old	20 February	
(Ukraine)	Dmytro Pahor	Khmelnytskyi, 21 y/o	20 February	Shot in the head next to the SBU office in Khmelnytskyi
(Ukraine)	Yuriy Parashchuk	Lived in Kharkiv, born in Talne, Cherkasy Oblast. Born in 1966 (47 y/o)	20 February	Shot in the head and killed by sniper on Instytutska Street.
(Ukraine)	Anatoliy Korneyev	From Havrylivtsi, Khmelnytskyi Oblast	20 February	Killed by sniper.
(Ukraine)	Andriy Sayenko	From Fastiv. 42 years old	20 February	7th Sotnia of Maidan Self-Defense. Killed by a sniper
(Ukraine)	Yosyp Shylinh	Born on 14 February 1953 in Drohobych, Lviv Oblast	20 February	Shot in the head by a sniper next to October Palace
(Ukraine)	Viktor Chmilenko	From Borysivka, Bobrynets Raion, Kirovohrad Oblast. Born in 1961	20 February	Killed by sniper
(Ukraine)	Vitaliy Smolinsky	Furmanivka village. From Cherkasy Oblast.	20 February	Brought to St. Michael's Golden-Domed Monastery
(Ukraine)	Bohdan Solchanyk	From Staryi Sambir, Lviv Oblast, Professor of Ukrainian Catholic University	20 February	Brought to St. Michael's Golden-Domed Monastery
(Ukraine)	Igor Tkachuk	From Znamensk, Kaliningrad Oblast (Russia). Born in 1975. Father of three children with the youngest only a year old.	20 February	Killed by sniper.
(Ukraine)	Bohdan Ilkiv	Shchyrets, Lviv Oblast, 51 years old	22 February	Shot twice in the stomach on Maidan. Died in the hospital.
(Ukraine)	Roman Tochyn	From Khodoriv, Lviv Oblast. Born in 1970, Svoboda party member	20 February	Shot in the head by a sniper.
(Ukraine)	Oleksandr Tsariok	Kalinin, Vasylkiv Raion, Kyiv Oblast	20 February	Killed by sniper
(Ukraine)	Oleh Ushnevych	From Drohobych, born in 1982	20 February	Killed by sniper
(Ukraine)	Roman Varenytsia	from Yavoriv Raion, Lviv Oblast. Born on 14 December 1978	20 February	Killed by sniper
(Ukraine)	Nazar Voytovych	17-year-old from Travneve village, Ternopil Oblast	20 February	Brought to St. Michael's Golden-Domed Monastery
(Ukraine)	Anatoliy Zhalovaha	Lviv, born in 1980	20 February	Brought to St. Michael's Golden-Domed Monastery
(Ukraine)	Anatoliy Zherebnyh	Rudky, Lviv Oblast	20 February	Brought to St. Michael's Golden-Domed Monastery
(Ukraine)	Bohdan Vaida	Letnya village, Lviv Oblast, 48 years old	20 February	Shot in the chest by a sniper
(Ukraine)	Volodymyr Chaplinsky	Obukhiv, born in 1979 (34 y/o)	20 February	Shot in the neck by a sniper
(Ukraine)	Ihor Dmytriv	Kopanky village, Ivano-Frankivsk Oblast, 30 years old	20 February	Shot in the chest by a sniper
(Ukraine)	Andriy Dyhdalovych	Sokilnyky, Pustomyty Raion, Lviv Oblast, born in 1973	20 February	Shot by a sniper while covering a friend.
(Ukraine)	Roman Hurik	Ivano-Frankivsk, born in 1994	19 February	Shot in the head by a sniper
(Ukraine)	Vitaliy Kotsyuba	Lviv, 32 years old	20 February	
(Ukraine)	Oleksandr Khrapachenko	Theatre director from Rivne, originally from Zdolbuniv, born in 1987 (26 years old)	20 February	Shot in the head and killed by sniper.
(Ukraine)	Vasyl Moysey	Born 23 March 1992 (21 years old) in Zubrets, Buchach Raion, Ternopil Oblast. He was living in Kivertsi, Volyn Oblast while a 4th year student at Lutsk University Institute of Human Development.	20 February	Shot in the chest by a sniper on the morning of 20 February. He had arrived with the Volyn Self-Defense unit on the Maidan in Kyiv 18 February. He died at the 17th hospital from the gunshot wound, despite having worn a bulletproof vest.
(Ukraine)	Valeriy Opanasyuk	Rivne, born in 1971. Had 4 children.	20 February	Shot by a sniper
(Ukraine)	Volodymyr Pavliuk	Kolomyia, Ivano-Frankivsk Oblast, about 40 years old	20 February	Shot four times, once in the head. Died in the hospital
(Ukraine)	Leonid Polyansky	About 35 years old	20 February	Body found in morgue on Oranzhereina Street
(Ukraine)	Oleksandr Shcherbaniuk	From Chernivtsi, Batkivshchina party member. Afghanistan war veteran.	20 February	Shot in the heart by a sniper
(Ukraine)	Maksym Shymko	From Vinnytsia, 33 years old	20 February	Shot by a sniper
(Ukraine)	Ivan Tarasiuk	Olyka village, Volyn Oblast, born in 1993, 21 years old	20 February	Killed by a sniper.
(Ukraine)	Ivan Bliok	Horodok, Lviv Oblast, born in 1973 (40 y/o)	20 February	Shot in the heart by a sniper
(Ukraine)	Mykola Pankiv	Lapayivka, Lviv Oblast, 39 years old	20 February	Shot in the chest
(Ukraine)	Vasyly Prohorskiy	Kyiv, 33 years old	18 February	Went to Maidan on 18 Feb, was missing, found dead and tortured.
(Ukraine)	Viktor Shvets	Hatne village, Kyiv Oblast, born in 1957	19 February	Shot in the stomach 3 times
(Ukraine)	Volodymyr Zherebniy	Born in Vyshnia village (moved to Rudky), Lviv Oblast, born in 1985 (28 years old)	20 February	Shot in the neck by a sniper
(Ukraine)	Liudmyla Sheremet	Khmelnytskyi, 73 years old	22 February	Shot in the head by an SBU officer on 19 February during the storming of SBU office in Khmelnytskyi. Died in the hospital three days later.
(Ukraine)	Yevhen Kotliar	Kharkiv, born in 1980 (33 y/o)	20 February	Shot on Instytutska Street.
(Ukraine)	Ivan Horodniuk	Berezne, Rivne Oblast, 29 years old	19 February	On 18 February, was beaten by "Berkut" and soaked from a water cannon. Returned home 19 February and died from a heart attack same night.
(Ukraine)	Andriy Tsepun	Kyiv, 35 years old	21 February	Activist, found beaten to death.
(Ukraine)	Maksym Mashkov		21 February	Died in the hospital
(Ukraine)	Maksym Horoshishin	Hrushivka village, Cherkasy Oblast, 25 years old	18 February	Died from gas grenade poisoning during the clashes on Instytutska Street.
(Ukraine)	Georgiy Arutiunyan	Georgian citizen of Armenian descent, lived in Rivne, born in 1960.	20 February	Shot by a sniper. Brought to St. Michael's Golden-Domed Monastery
(Ukraine)	Volodymyr Melnychuk	Lived in Kyiv, 40 years old	20 February	Was helping activists. Shot in the neck by a sniper while standing next to his wife.
(Georgia (country))	David Kipiani	Georgia	21 February	Found wounded, likely shot by a sniper, next to the barricades on Khmelnytskoho Street, died in the emergency vehicle.
(Ukraine)	Victor Chernets	Podibna, Cherkasy Oblast, born in 1977	19 February	Died from injury caused by the collision with an unidentified SUV while guarding an improvised checkpoint built to block special units and thugs on Kyiv-Odesa highway. The SUV was storming the checkpoint to open the way for the Interior troops.
(Ukraine)	Oleksandr Scherbatyuk	From Chernivtsi; 46 years old; Jewish; Afghan war veteran	20 February	Killed by snipers.
(Ukraine)	Volodymyr Topiy	Vyshnia village, Lviv Oblast, 57 years old	18 February	Died during the fire at the Trade Unions Building
(Ukraine)	Volodymyr Zubok	Chernihiv Oblast, born in 1985	20 January	
(Ukraine)	Viktor Khomyak	Activist	27 January	Body found hung on the Christmas Tree on the Maidan. Details are unknown.
(Ukraine)	Viktor Prokhorchuk	born in 1975 (38 years old)	18 February	Member of the self-defense. Found with his throat slit in the backyard of a Khreshchatyk house a week after disappearance on 18 February.
(Ukraine)	Andriy Zhanovachiy	born in 1964	20? February	
(Ukraine)	Volodymyr Boykiv	born in 1955	19 February	
(Ukraine)	Oleksiy Bratushko	From Sumy, born in 1971	20 February	Shot by a sniper on Instytutska Street.
(Ukraine)	Ihor Batchinsky	30 years old	25 February	
(Ukraine)	Mykola Tarshchuk	born in 1975	20 February	Shot in the neck by a sniper
(Ukraine)	Mykola Semisiuk	From Khmelnytskyi, born in 1986	20 February	Shot in the head by a sniper
(Ukraine)	Ihor Pehenko	Vyshhorod, Kyiv Oblast, born in 1970, 43 years old	20 February	Shot in the neck by a sniper
(Ukraine)	Vladyslav Zubenko	"Svoboda" Party activist from Kharkiv, born in 1991, 22 years old	28 February	Shot by a sniper 20 February, died from the wounds in the hospital.
(Ukraine)	Artem Mazur	26 years old	3 March	Sustained heavy head trauma, died from the wounds in the hospital.
(Ukraine)	Taras Slobodian	From Ternopil Oblast, 31 years old	5 March	Body was found in the woods of Sumskyi Forest in October 2013? (query date - precedes date of death)
(Ukraine)	Mykhailo Kostyshyn	Nyzhnii Strutyn, Ivano-Frankivsk Oblast	26 February	Was on Maidan from the first days. Beaten to death in January, lasted in the hospital for almost a month but did not recover.
(Ukraine)	Artur Khuntsaar	From Ivano-Frankivsk, born in 1984 (29 years old)	18 February	Killed by a sniper.
(Ukraine)	Yuriy Nechiporuk	From Khmilnyk, Vinnytsia Oblast, 30 years old	18 February	Activist, kidnapped and killed by thugs. Sustained 20 knife wounds.
(Ukraine)	Anatoliy Kurach	From Rivne	21 February	Died because of a head trauma received on Maidan
(Ukraine)	Oleksandr Badera	From Volodymyr, born in 1948 (66 years old)	28 January	Died because of trauma received 22 January on Hrushevskoho Street.
(Ukraine)	Oleksandr Baliuk	From Lypovy village, Zhytomyr Oblast, born in 1974 (39 years old)	20 February	Received a firearm wound to the chest. Was trying to rescue another person.
(Ukraine)	Reshat Ametov	From Crimea, born in 1975. Father of 3 children.	3 March?	Participated in the protests. Disappeared 3 March, found on 15 March, tortured to death.
(Ukraine)	Vyacheslav Vorona	Born in Prypiat, lived in Kyiv	9 March	Received a head injury during the clashes, was brought to the intensive care, never recovered from coma.
(Ukraine)	Vasyl Aksenin	From Letyache, Ternopil Oblast, born in 1961.	12 March	Seriously wounded on 20 February in Kyiv. At the end of February he was sent for treatment to Poland, but did not survive.
(Ukraine)	Olha Bura	From Rypne, Lviv Oblast, born in 1986.	10 March	Participated in the protests since the end of November. Died at a hospital from injuries received during the clashes.
(Ukraine)	Vasyl Sheremet	From Lanchyn, Ivano-Frankivsk Oblast, born in 1949 (64 y/o).	7 March	Died from wounds sustained during the clashes with "Berkut"
(Ukraine)	Ivan Nakonechny	From Kyiv, born in 1931 (82 years old).	7 March	Navy officer. Was on the Euromaidan since 30 November. Died from wounds sustained during the clashes on Instytutska Street on 19 February.
(Ukraine)	Petro Hadzha	Lived in Kyiv, born in Rakhiv, Zakarpattia Oblast, born in 1966 (47 years old).	22 March	Was on the Euromaidan since its first days. Member of the 8th Sotnia. Died in the hospital due to gas poisoning which he had sustained during the clashes on Hrushevskoho Street.
(Ukraine)	Dmytro Chernyavskiy	Born in Donetsk Oblast. Studied at Lviv National University, born in 1992 (22 years old).	13 March	On 13 March, participated in the meeting for the unity of Ukraine in Donetsk. Was stabbed to death in clashes with pro-Russian activists.
(Ukraine)	Roman Olikh	Born in the village of Hybalivka, Vinnytsia Oblast.	15 February	Came to Maidan in January. On 6 February he was injured and taken to a hospital in Kyiv. Fell into coma and never recovered.

=== Unnamed dead activists ===
Unidentified activists were reported killed.

- During the Hrushevskoho Street riots, a 22‑year-old man died falling from the colonnade near the Lobanovsky Dynamo Stadium during a beating by police; the cause of death was multiple injuries, particularly spinal fracture.
- Two unnamed shooting victims were announced on the evening of 22 February. Their bodies disappeared from the street after the action of Berkut in the early morning 22 January. Roman Senyk was later identified as shot and killed on this date.
- On 26 January, the body of a man was found in Obolon district, with his hands bound.
- On 29 January, two male activists were shot on Hrushevskoho Street and brought to a Kyiv hospital. One died from gunshot wounds the following day. A UDAR MP accused police of shooting the two as a provocation.
- On 15 February, the body of a missing activist was found outside of Kyiv.
- On 18–19 February, 16 protesters were killed in clashes, of whom seven have been named.
- On 19 February at 9 p.m. a young man was killed in Khmelnytsky outside the SBU building. 5Kanal reported both a 23‑year-old and a 16‑year-old were shot and killed.
- On 20 February, at least 34 protesters were shot dead as of 1 p.m., with reporters verifying the bodies (15 at Kozatsky Hotel, 12 at Ukraine Hotel, 7 at the central post office). Kyiv Post journalists reported an additional eight bodies on Khreshchatyk Street early afternoon, separate from the previous count. Olha Bohomolets, one of the attending physicians to 12 fatal gunshot victims at Ukraine Hotel, said that the victims were shot with precision rifles and powerful ammunition that broke their bones.

=== Other deaths ===
On 18 February militants from the Social-National Assembly and the Patriots of Ukraine seized and burned down the central office of the ruling Party of Regions. A 57-year-old IT engineer Vladimir Konstantinovich Zakharov died in the fire. According to Party of Regions' statement, Zakharov proposed to the attackers to provide an exit route for the women office workers and was mortally struck in the head with a bat. According to the Ukrainian news site Censor.net, Zakharov died of carbon monoxide poisoning while taking money from the office safe. On 10 April 2020 Ukraine's State Bureau of Investigations handed a murder suspicion notice to a former People's Deputy of Ukraine Tetiana Chornovol. Chornovol is accused of "controlling actions of a group of people and directly participating in the arson" of the Party of Regions office building.

== Police officers' deaths ==
As of 2 March, The Ministry of Internal Affairs reported 18 officer fatalities related to the conflict. Two deaths that occurred during the crisis were considered by The Interior Ministry's as having no relation to Euromaidan or civil unrest. In addition, according to the Minister of Internal Affairs, another police officer, 30-year-old captain of the Internal Troops of Ukraine Dmytro Donets, died from a heart attack. On 18 February, six officers were killed in action against protest camps in Kyiv.

Rank	Name	Details	Date of death	Reference
Lieutenant	Dmytro Vlasenko	Born 1982, Internal Troops (Crimea)	18 February	
Lieutenant	Vitaliy Honcharov	Born 1989, Internal Troops (Crimea)	18 February	
Lieutenant	Volodymyr Yevtushok	Born 1971, Patrol Service (Kyiv)	18 February	
Senior lieutenant	Andriy Fediukin	Born 1972, Berkut (Crimea)	18 February	
	Oleksiy Ivanenko	Born 1977, Internal Troops (Kharkiv)	18 February	
Lieutenant	Petro Savitsky	Born 1972, Patrol Service (Kyiv)	18 February	
Sergeant	Vasil' Bulitko	Born 1986, Berkut (Kyiv)	18 February	
Sergeant	Serhiy Tsvihun	Born 1990, Berkut (Zaporizhia)	18 February	
	Ivan Tepliuk	Born 1993, Internal Troops (Kyiv)	18 February	
	Maxim Tretiak	Born 1993, Internal Troops (Kyiv)	18 February	
	Serhiy Spichak	Berdyansk, Zaporizhia region	19 February	
	Volodymyr Zubok			
	Vitaliy Zakharchenko			
	Roman Kizik			
	Nazariy Myrka			
	Serhiy Mikhaylovych			
	Mykola Simisiuk			

== Legacy ==
Order of the Heavenly Hundred Heroes

Ukrainian sources refer to the activists who died during Euromaidan as "The Heavenly Hundred". In April 2014, the Kyiv City State Administration and Culture Ministry of Ukraine stated that they expected to open a memorial complex "to the heroes of Heavenly Hundred" in February 2015, on the occasion of the anniversary of the dead activists.

On 1 July 2014, the Verkhovna Rada (the parliament of Ukraine) established the Medal "Order of the Heavenly Hundred Heroes".

On 25 August 2014, President Petro Poroshenko claimed he had called the 2014 Ukrainian parliamentary election in order to purify parliament of MPs who had supported "the [January] Dictatorship laws that took the lives of the Heavenly hundred".

The Kyiv City Council renamed a part of Instytutska Street into the Alley of Heroes of the Heavenly Hundred on 20 November 2014, effective from 30 January 2015.

President Poroshenko decreed on 11 February 2015 that 20 February will annually be commemorated as "Day of the Heavenly Hundred Heroes". His decree established [an action plan to accomplish] a museum in Kyiv dedicated to Euromaidan. On 20 February, it is compulsory for Ukrainian TV channels to display a flaming candle or a similar stylized image, and, at noon, a minute of silence must be observed.

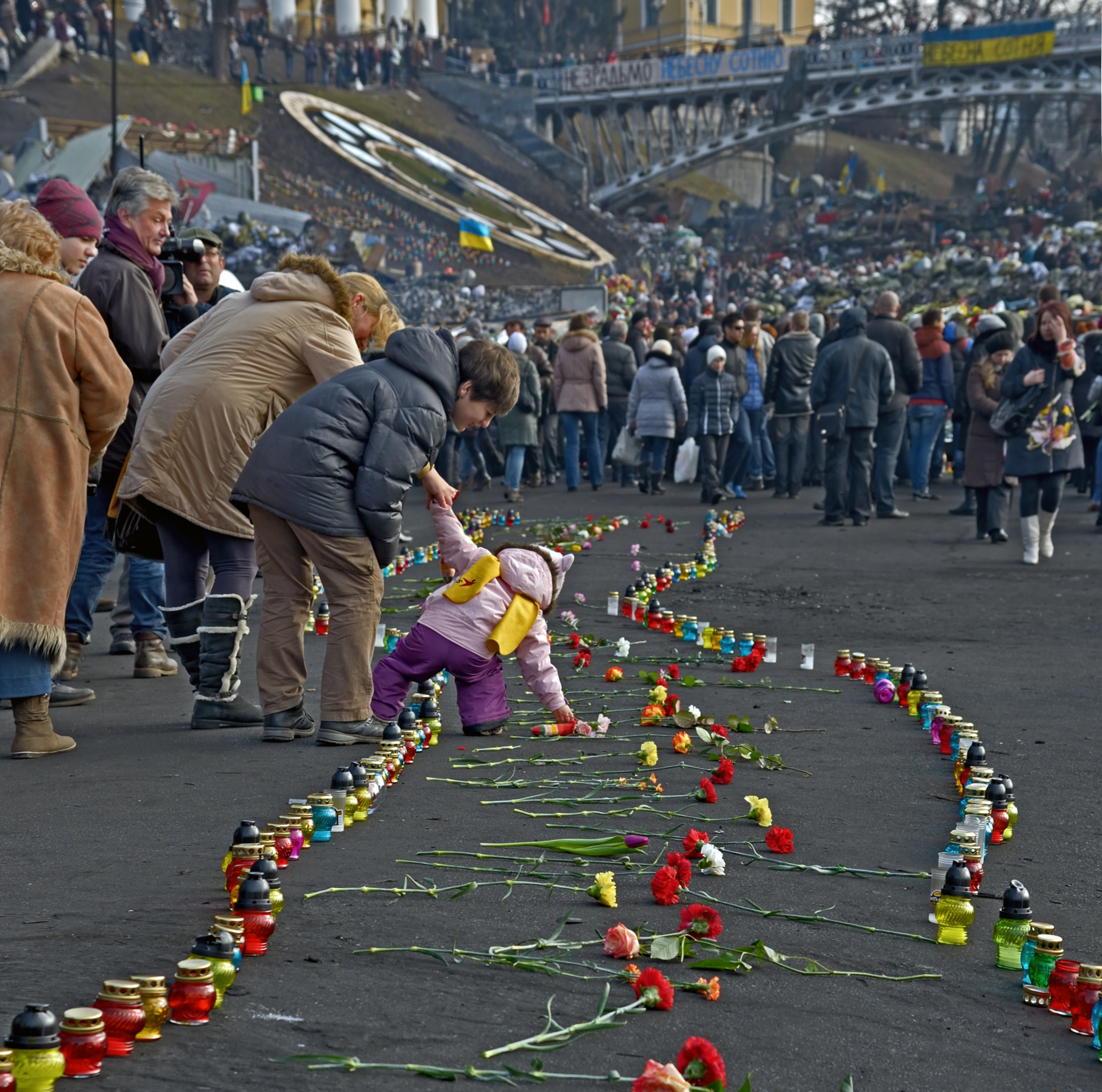
Memorial in Kyiv for those killed, 24 February 2014

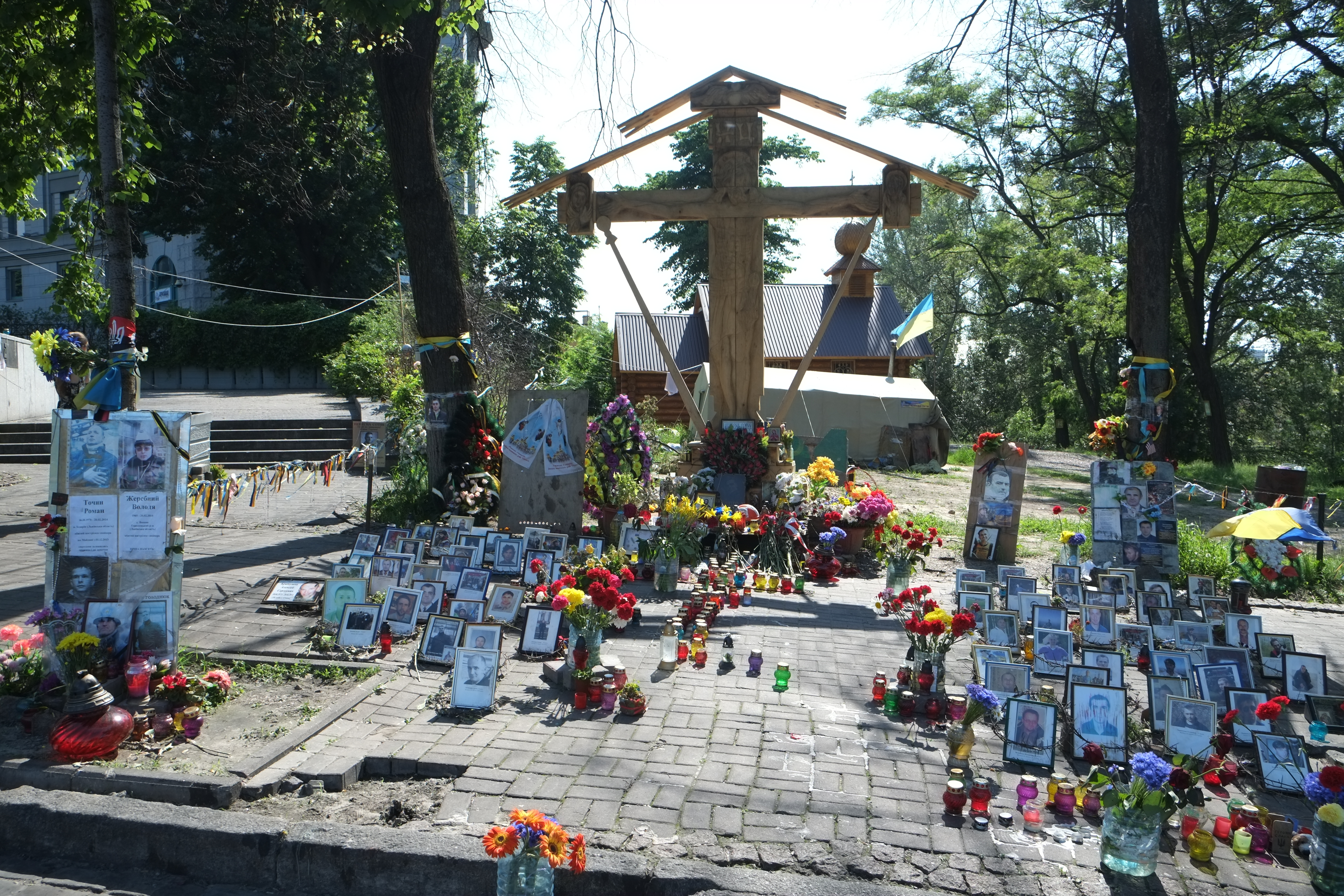
Memorial in Kyiv, May 2014

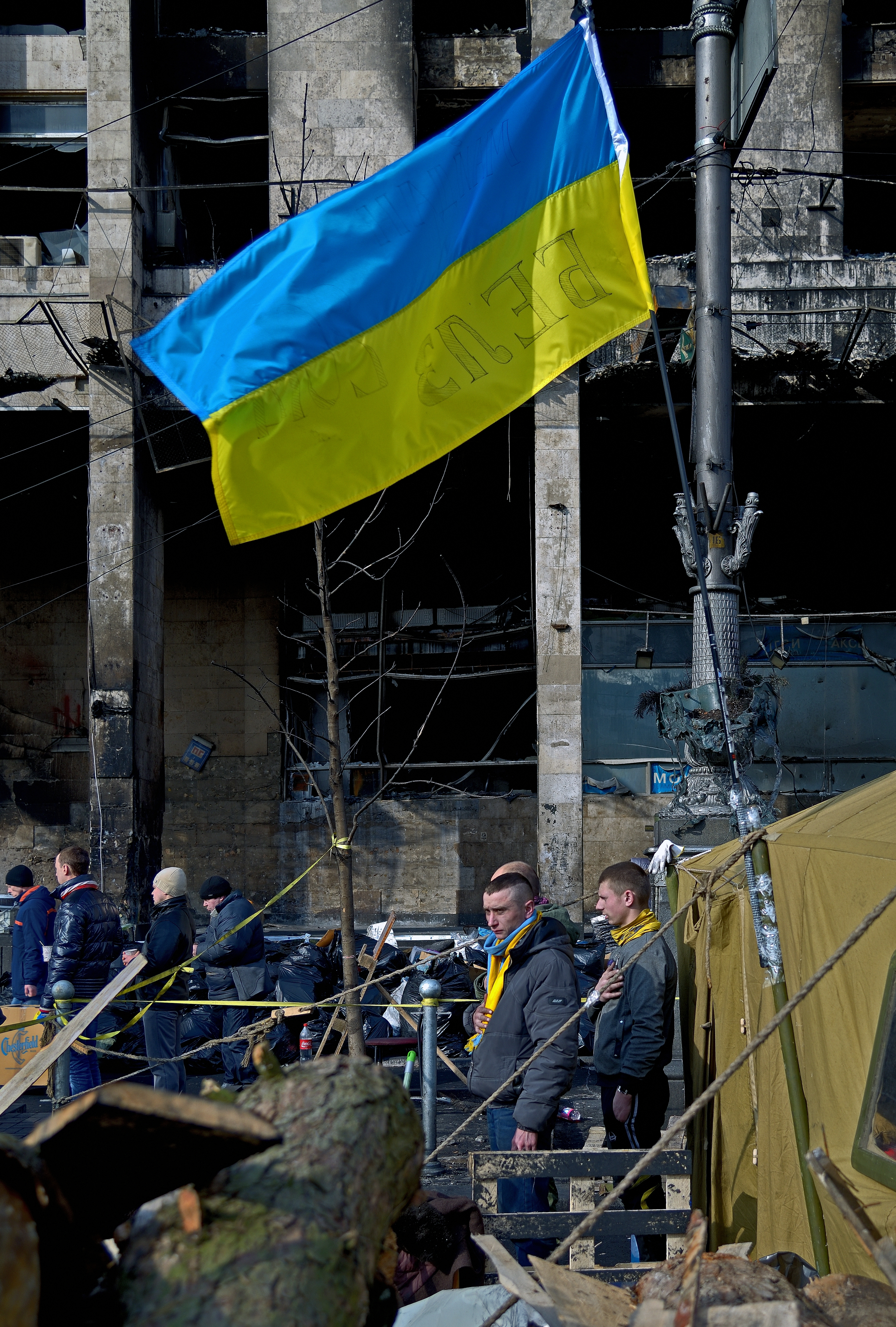
Moment of silence in memory of killed Euromaidan participants

=== Monuments ===
- On 23 February in Poltava, a statue of Lenin taken down two days previously had its pedestal converted into a "monument to the Maidan Heroes".
- On 13 April 2014 in Buda, Chyhyryn Raion (the historical Cold Ravine), a monument to "the Heavenly Hundred" was installed.
- On 6 May 2014 in Dubno, a commemorative landmark to "the Heavenly Hundred" was unveiled.
- On 21 September 2015 outside of Chicago in Bloomingdale, Illinois, a monument commemorating the people perished during the Euromaidan was erected.
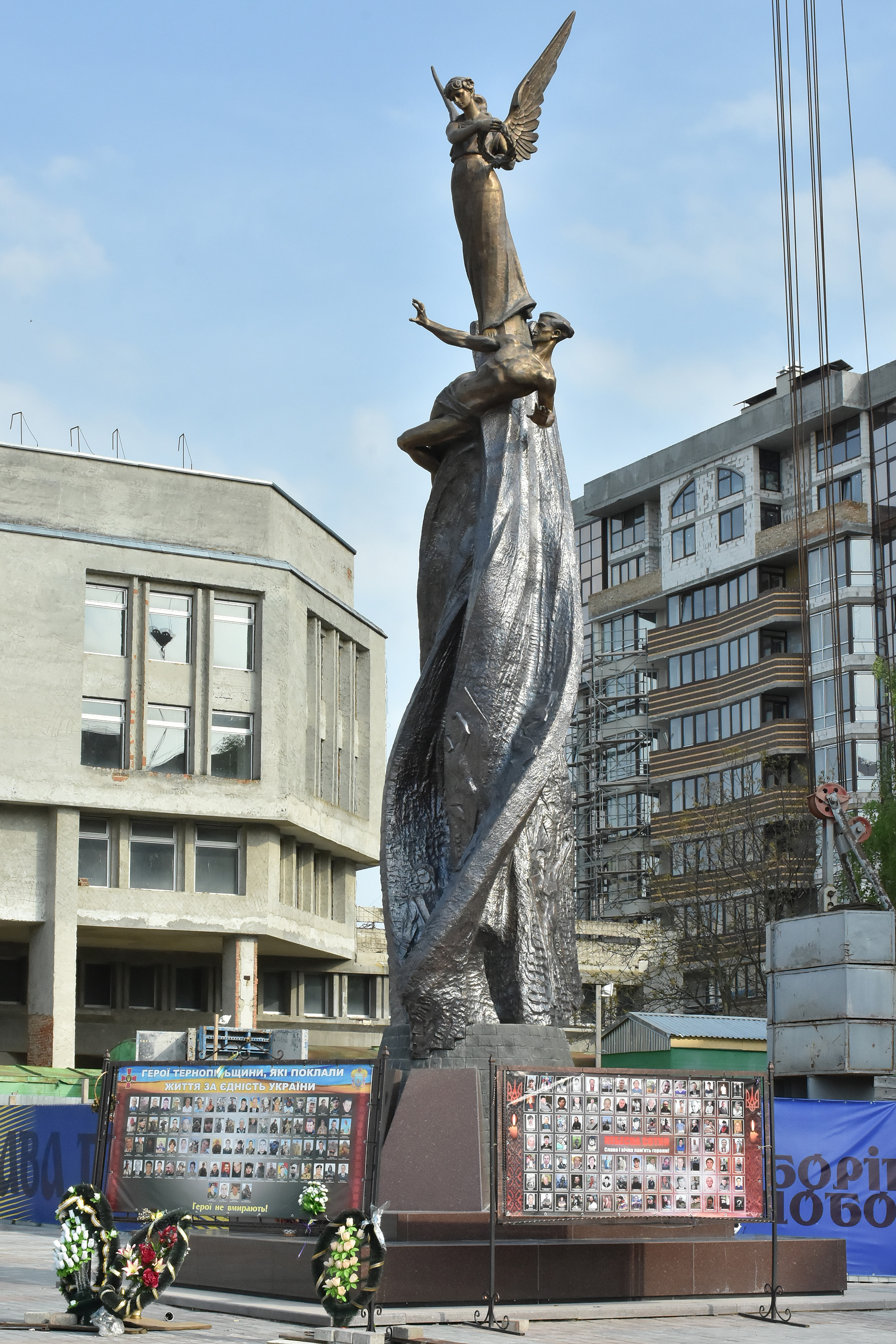
"Heavenly Hundred" monument in Ternopil

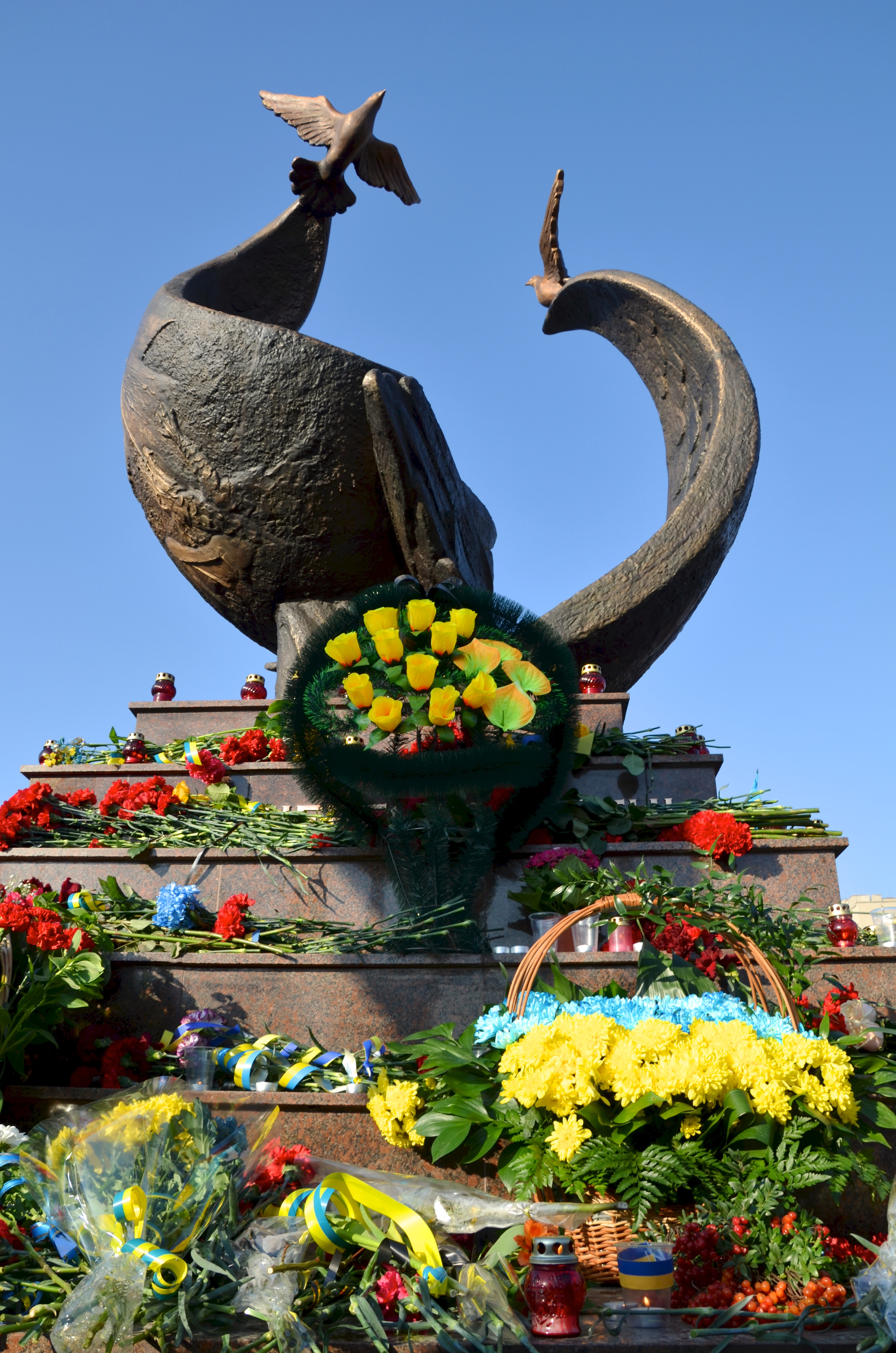
"Heavenly Hundred" monument in Mykolaiv

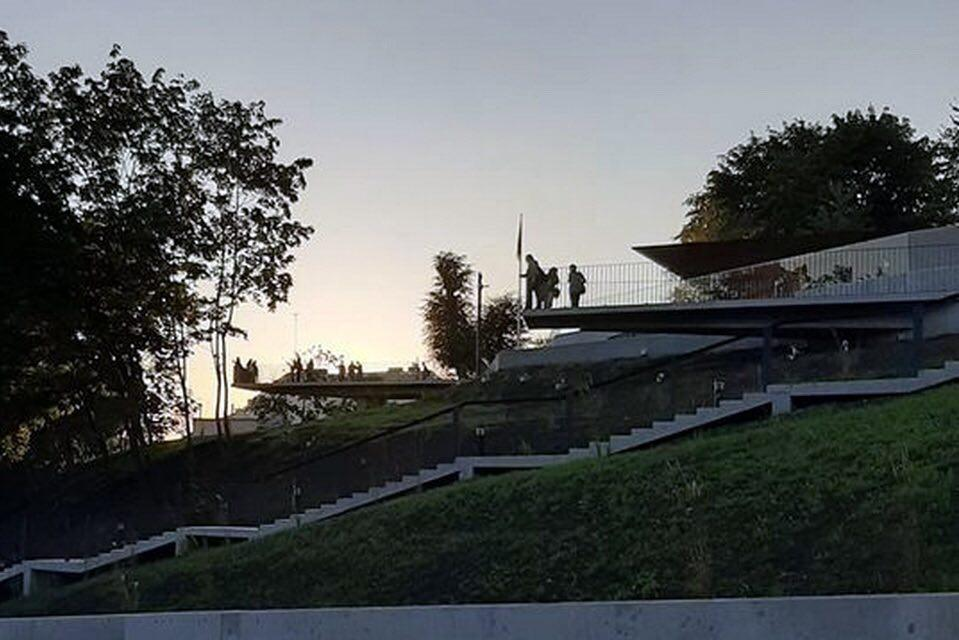
Nebesna sotnia memorial in Lviv

== See also ==
- Casualties during the 2013–2014 Ukraine crisis
- Euromaidan
