= Walter Schütz =

German politician (1897–1933)

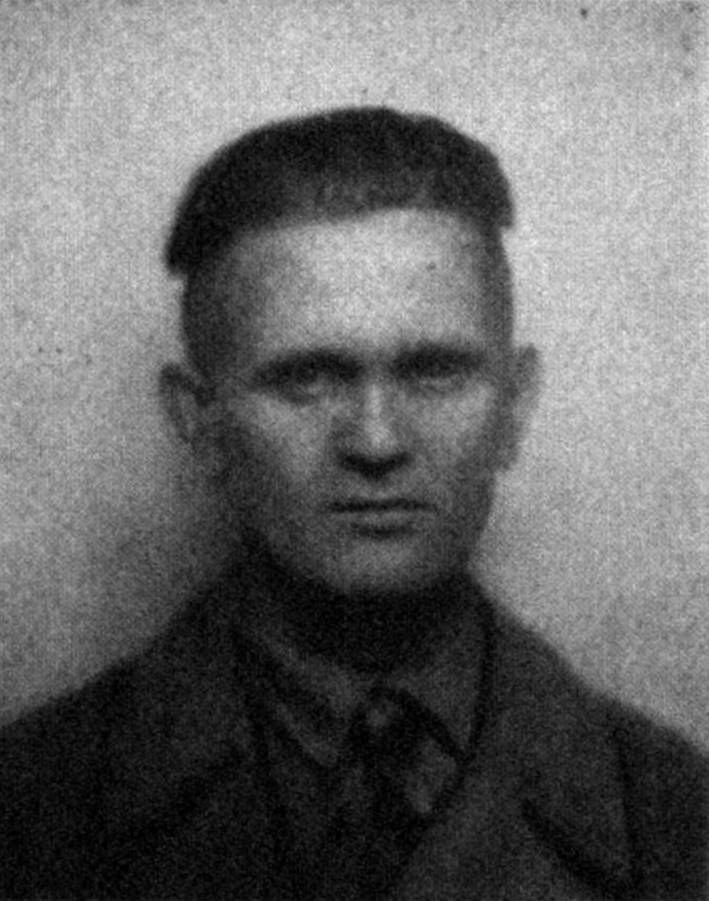
- Schütz c. 1930

Member of the Reichstag for East Prussia
- In office 13 October 1930 – 28 February 1933
- Preceded by: Multi-member district
- Succeeded by: Constituency abolished

Personal details
- Born: 25 October 1897 Wehlau, Province of East Prussia, Kingdom of Prussia, German Empire
- Died: 29 March 1933 (aged 35) Königsberg, Province of East Prussia, Free State of Prussia, Nazi Germany
- Party: KPD (after 1921)
- Spouse: Elise Sahnwald
- Children: Gustav
- Other offices held: 1928: Organizational Leader, East Prussia KPD; 1925–1930: Member, Königsberg City Council

Walter Schütz (25 October 1897 – between 27 and 29 March 1933) was a German communist politician.

== Biography ==
Schütz was born in Wehlau (today Znamensk, Russia), where he attended school. He was trained as a machine fitter and worked at the municipal electricity works of Königsberg.

After World War I he worked as a car mechanic and joined the Communist Party of Germany (KPD) in 1919. Schütz became the East Prussian Chairman of the Communist Party and Chief editor of the communist newspaper for East Prussia "Echo des Ostens" (Echo of the East).

Schütz was elected as a member of the Reichstag in September 1930. He was arrested by the Nazi-SA in February or March 1933 and tortured and murdered in the SA headquarters of Königsberg.

== Literature ==
- Hermann Weber/Andreas Herbst: Deutsche Kommunisten. Biographisches Handbuch 1918 bis 1945, Berlin: Karl Dietz Verlag 2004, p. 709 ISBN 3-320-02044-7
