= The Winter That Changed Us =

Ukrainian documentary film cycle about Euromaidan

- Зима, що нас змінила
- Production companies: 1+1 Production; Babylon’13
- Distributed by: 1+1
- Release date: 3 April 2014
- Country: Ukraine
- Language: Ukrainian

The Winter That Changed Us is a cycle of documentary films about the events that took place on the Euromaidan during the Revolution of Dignity in Ukraine. It was produced jointly by the Ukrainian television channel 1+1 (1+1 Production) and the creative association Babylon’13.

The premiere of the cycle on the 1+1 channel took place on 3 April 2014, timed to coincide with the fortieth day of commemoration for those killed in the clashes on Instytutska Street in Kyiv. In late spring and early summer 2014 the films were presented in the United States, where the material shocked viewers who had not had access to Ukrainian media coverage of the protests.

== Episodes ==
The cycle consists of a series of stand‑alone documentary films, each devoted to a particular aspect or episode of Euromaidan.

=== Heavenly Hundred ===
The first film, Heavenly Hundred, focuses on those who were killed during the protests and became known collectively as the “Heavenly Hundred”. The exact number of people included in this group remains uncertain, as it includes not only those shot dead in central Kyiv in late February 2014 but also protesters who disappeared or were killed in other parts of Ukraine from the beginning of Euromaidan. The film shows how, over the course of three days, nearly one hundred people were killed in the centre of Kyiv. It is the longest film in the cycle, with a running time of 44 minutes.

=== First Death ===
The second film, First Death, tells the story of those who died for freedom and for their own state, focusing in particular on Serhii Nihoyan, a young activist who was killed in central Kyiv at the end of January 2014.

=== Hrushevsky Cocktails ===
The third film, Hrushevsky Cocktails, examines the escalation of street confrontations after the violent dispersal of students and the subsequent protests on Hrushevsky Street. It presents the appearance of Molotov cocktails in the city centre as a reaction to the authorities’ attempts to suppress the demonstrations and notes that, according to reports, the first Molotov cocktail was thrown by an artist‑architect, underlining the cultural dimension of the uprising.

=== Mezhyhiria. Daddy’s House ===
The fourth film, Mezhyhiria. Daddy’s House, directed by Yuliia Shashkova, is devoted to the former private residence of President Viktor Yanukovych at Mezhyhiria. The authors draw a contrast between the luxurious estate at Mezhyhiria and the decaying family home in the industrial town of Yenakiieve, illustrating the social and moral gap between the president’s lifestyle and that of ordinary citizens.

=== Self-Defence ===
The fifth film, Self‑Defence, directed by Kostiantyn Kliatskin and Mariia Ponomarova, explores the phenomenon of Maidan Self‑Defence units and their role in organising the protection of protesters and the protest camp.

=== Fire in the Trade Unions Building ===
The sixth film, Fire in the Trade Unions Building, directed by Volodymyr Tykhyi, is devoted to the fire that broke out in the Kyiv Trade Unions Building during the night of 18–19 February 2014, one of the most tragic episodes of Euromaidan. The film uses unique footage shot inside the building and presents different eyewitness accounts and versions regarding the causes of the fire.

=== Automaidan ===
The seventh film, Automaidan, focuses on the activist car convoys known as Automaidan. According to the filmmakers, Automaidan was one of the protest movement’s key inventions and was particularly feared by Yanukovych’s “criminal” regime, as its raids on Mezhyhiria undermined the myth of the president’s untouchability and the “safaris” against hired thugs (titushky) proved to be an effective form of resistance.

== Production and release ==
The cycle was created as a joint project of the 1+1 TV channel (1+1 Production) and the independent film collective Babylon’13. It combines television reportage techniques with the observational style of documentary cinema, using footage shot by professional crews and activists on the ground.

On 19 May 2014 the film Heavenly Hundred was presented at the Cannes Film Festival, bringing international attention to the Ukrainian protests and their victims. The cycle has also been shown at various festivals, public screenings and discussions dedicated to Euromaidan and contemporary Ukrainian history.

== See also ==
- Euromaidan
- Heavenly Hundred
