= Strodtmann =

Strodtmann is a German surname. Notable people with the surname include:

- Johann Christoph Strodtmann (1717–1756), author
- Johann Sigismund Strodtmann (1797–1888), philologist and theologist
- Adolf Strodtmann (1829–1879), poet and literary historian
