= Serhiy Kemsky =

Ukrainian anarchist (1981–2014)

Hero of Ukraine Serhiy Kemsky
- Сергій Кемський
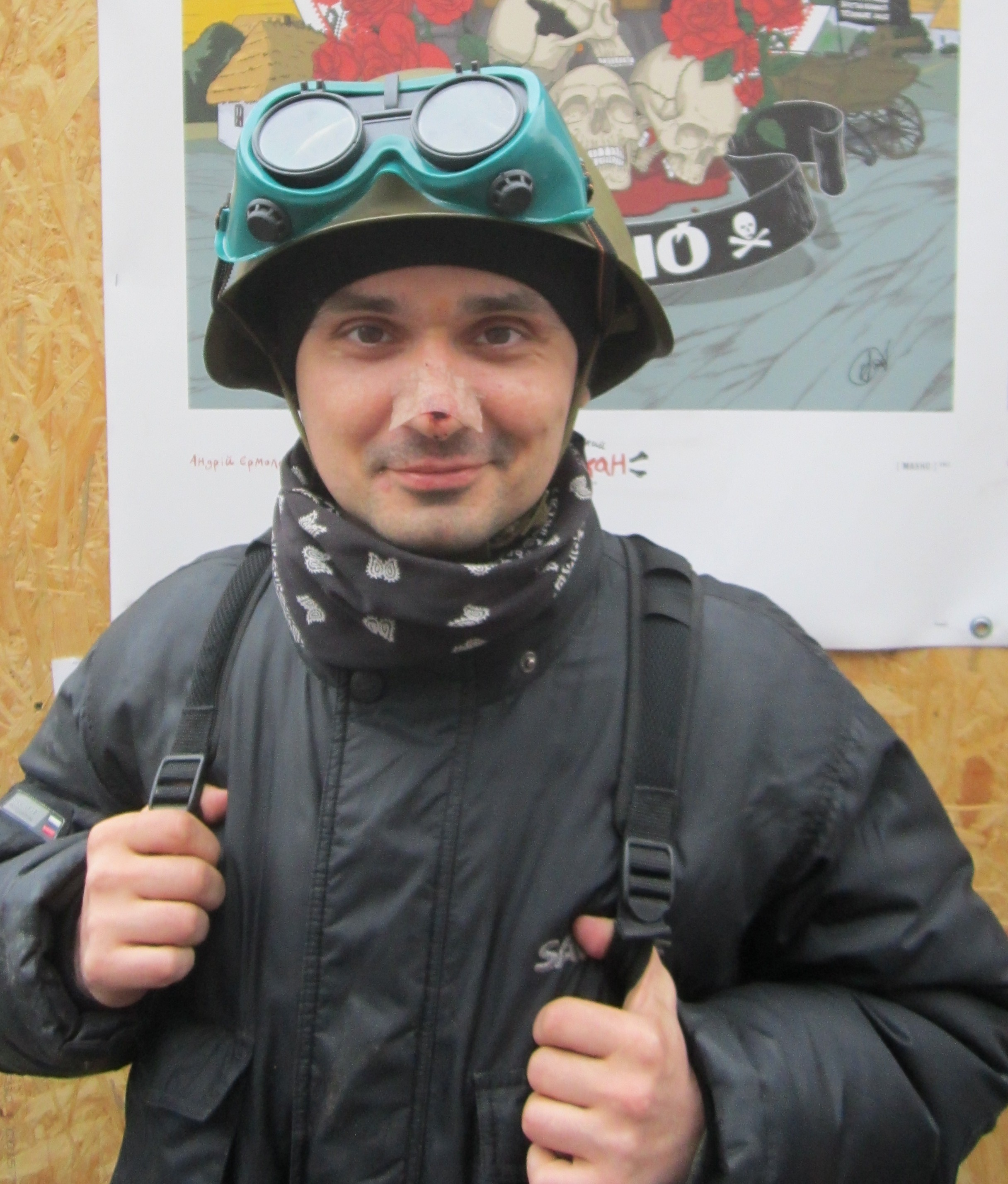
- Born: 15 November 1981; Kerch, Ukrainian SSR, Soviet Union
- Died: 20 February 2014 (aged 32); Kyiv, Ukraine
- Cause of death: Gun shot (during the Revolution of Dignity)
- Education: University of Lviv
- Known for: Euromaidan
- Awards: Hero of Ukraine

Serhiy Oleksandrovich Kemsky (15 November 1981 – 20 February 2014) was a Ukrainian anarchist and an activist during the Euromaidan.

== Biography ==
Kemsky was born on 15 November 1981, in the city of Kerch. His mother was Tamara Kemskaya. After graduating from high school in Kerch, he entered the University of Lviv, majoring in political science. After university he worked at the Kyiv Institute of Political and Economic Risks and Prospects. He founded and was the administrator of the site "Cooperative Movement", collaborated with the newspapers The Day and Gazeta.ua, and was published in the newspaper FrAza. He became one of the translators of the song Imagine by John Lennon into the Ukrainian language.

=== Euromaidan ===
He spent the last years of his life in Korosten, Zhytomyr region. He was a supporter of anarchism, and was an activist of the Ukrainian Anarchist Union.

At the end of 2013, he was one of the organizers of the Euromaidan rallies in Korosten. He visited the Euromaidan in Kyiv several times, where he took part in the creation of the anarchist "Black Hundred". On 1 December 2013, he took part in a mass rally in Kyiv, where, in a column of leftists, trade unionists and human rights activists, he protested against police violence. On 19 December 2013, the newspaper Ukrainian Truth published his article "Do you hear, Maidan?" (Ukrainian: Чуєш, Майдане?), where he called for the development of direct democracy and local self-government. In this article, he also proposed the principles of uniting Euromaidan and shared his thoughts on ways of public pressure on the authorities.

During the events of 20 February 2014 in Kyiv, he was killed by a sniper shot on Institutskaya Street, not far from the October Palace, during a clash between supporters of Euromaidan and law enforcement agencies. His body was found in the courtyard near the St. Michael's Golden-Domed Monastery.

On 22 February, a farewell ceremony took place on the central square of Korosten. Serhiy Kemsky was buried in the village of Velikiy Yablonets, Zhytomyr region, in the homeland of his parents. That same day, in Kerch, during a Euromaidan rally, the organizers honored the memory of Kemsky with a minute of silence. The Prime Minister of Crimea Anatolii Mohyliov sent a telegram of condolences to the relatives of the deceased.

In July 2014, the mayor of Korosten, Vladimir Moskalenko, supported the idea to rename one of the city streets in honor of Serhiy Kemsky. In November 2014, a memorial plaque was erected on the house where his parents live in Korosten.

== Awards ==
On 21 November 2014, the title of Hero of Ukraine was awarded to Kemsky posthumously for "civil courage, patriotism, heroic defense of the constitutional principles of democracy, human rights and freedoms, selfless service to the Ukrainian people, shown during the Revolution of Dignity".
