= Die rote Fahne des Ostens =

Newspaper in Königsberg, Germany (1919–1922)

- Type: Newspaper
- Editor: Martin Hoffmann
- Founded: 1919
- Ceased publication: 1922
- Political alignment: Communist
- City: Königsberg
- Country: Germany

Die rote Fahne des Ostens ('The Red Flag of the East') was a newspaper published from Königsberg. It was the organ of the East Prussia-Danzig organization (Bezirk) of the Communist Party of Germany. It functioned as the local edition of the Berlin-based newspaper Die Rote Fahne between 1919 and September 1922. During this period Martin Hoffmann served as editor of the newspaper. Erich Wollenberg became the editor-in-chief of Die rote Fahne des Ostens in 1922. In 1922 Die rote Fahne des Ostens was replaced by Echo des Ostens.
