= Herbert Pilch =

- Born: 13 February 1927; Wehlau
- Died: 19 April 2018 (aged 91)
- Known for: English Phonetics, Celtic Studies
- Scientific career
- Fields: Linguistics, Phonetics, Celtology
- Workplaces: University of Freiburg

Herbert Pilch (13 February 1927 – 19 April 2018) was a German linguist and celtologist. He was a professor of English language and literature at the University of Freiburg. His contributions to linguistics included a theory of phonemes and studies of Basel German. His main work is the Manual of English Phonetics. In 2008 he was awarded the Order of Merit of the Federal Republic of Germany.

== Works ==
- Phonemtheorie (Basel 1964)
- Empirical Linguistics (Munich 1976)
- Manual of English Phonetics (Munich 1994)
- Altenglischer Lehrgang + Altenglische Grammatik (Munich 1970)
- Sound, Sense, and System. Herbert Pilch and Postwar German Studies in English Linguistics (1955–1985) (Heidelberg 1987)
- Die keltischen Sprachen und Literaturen (Heidelberg 2007)
