= Order of the Heavenly Hundred Heroes =

Order of the Heaven's Hundred Heroes
- Order of the Heaven's Hundred Heroes
- Type: Single-grade order
- Awarded for: Defending principles of democracy, human rights and freedom during the Euromaidan-protests
- Presented by: Ukraine
- Motto: Freedom and Dignity
- Status: Currently awarded
- Established: 1 July 2014
- First award: 27 November 2014

Highlights
- Total: 4
- Total awarded posthumously: 4
- Ribbon of the Order of the Heaven's Hundred Heroes

Precedence
- Next (higher): Order of Bohdan Khmelnytsky
- Next (lower): Order For Courage

The Order of the Heaven's Hundred Heroes (Ukrainian: Орден Героїв Небесної Сотні, romanized: Orden Heroiv Nebesnoi Sotni) is an order of Ukraine presented for civil courage, patriotism and the defense of the constitutional principles of democracy, human rights and freedom; humanitarian, social and charitable activities; selfless service to the Ukrainian people during the Euromaidan-protests; as well as any events related to the protection of the independence, sovereignty and territorial integrity of Ukraine.

== Background ==
The name "Heaven's Hundred" refers to the participants killed during Euromaidan.

The order was established on 1 July 2014 when the Verkhovna Rada (the parliament of Ukraine) adopted the Law "On amendments to article 7 of the Law of Ukraine "On National Awards of Ukraine". On 26 June 2014, Ukrainian President Petro Poroshenko first proposed to parliament to amend the law on government awards by introducing the Order of the Heroes of the Heaven's Hundred.

== Appearance ==
A nationwide contest for the best design of the Order of Heroes hundreds of Heaven was won by Taras Wozniak and Konstantina Kovalyshyn from Lviv.

== Recipients ==
On 27 November 2014, the three non-Ukrainian citizens killed in the Euromaidan events were each posthumously awarded the title Knight of the Order of the Heaven's Hundred Heroes.

- Republic of Belarus (1991–1994) — Mykhailo Zhyznevskyi (26 January 1988 – 22 January 2014), shot in the heart
- Georgia — Zurab Khurtsia (29 July 1960 – 18 February 2014), died of heart attack during demonstrations in Independence Square
- Georgia — David Kipiani (28 June 1980 – 21 February 2014), shot twice

On 16 February 2018, Taras Bilchuk was posthumously awarded the title Knight of the Order of the Heaven's Hundred Heroes.

- Ukraine — Taras Bilchuk (1960 – 14 August 2017)

== See also ==
- List of people killed during Euromaidan
- Commemorative Medal for Participants of the Barricades of 1991, a similar Latvian award
