= Znamensk, Kaliningrad Oblast =

Settlement in Kaliningrad Oblast

Znamensk Зна́менск
- Rural locality
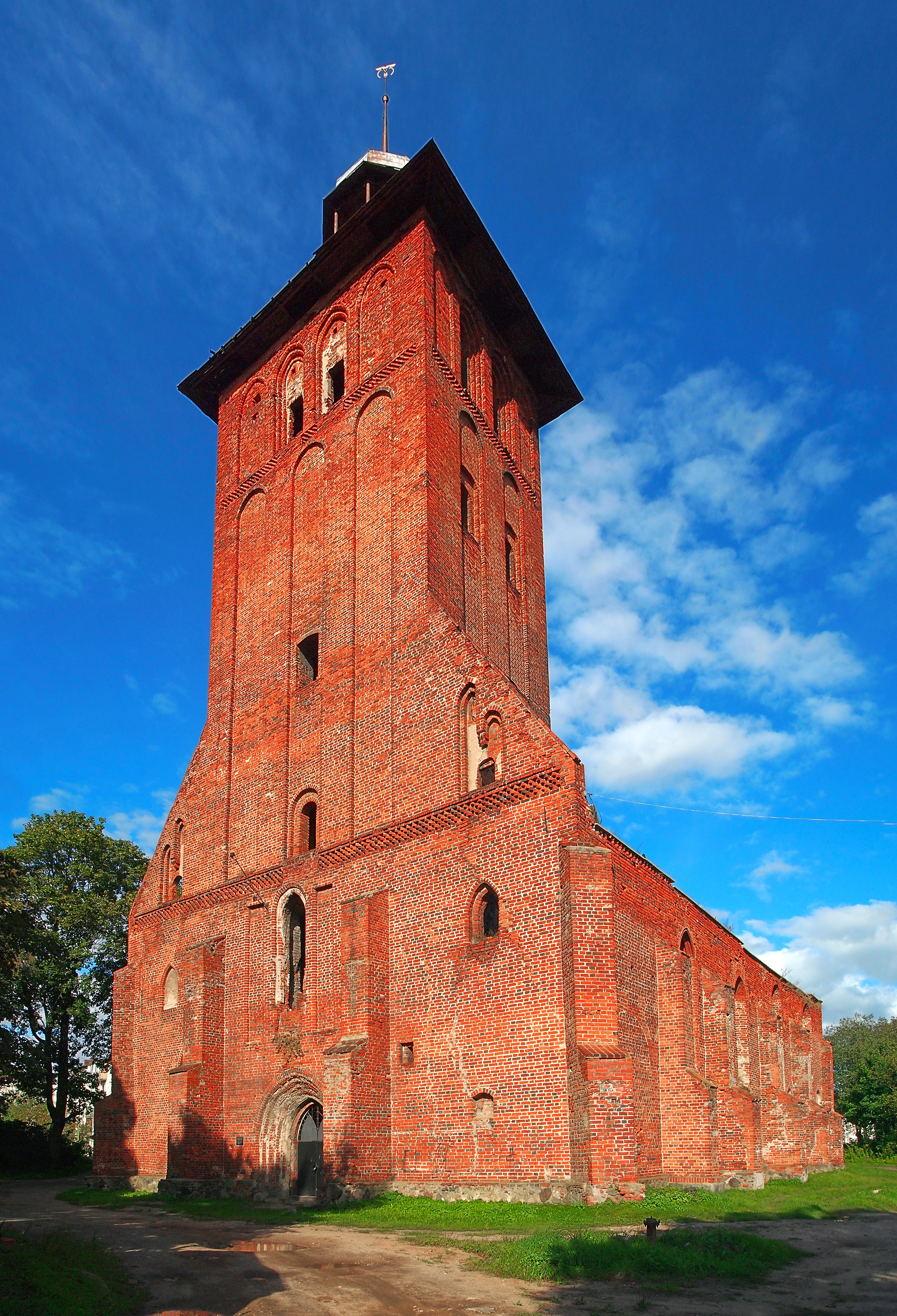
- Ruins of St. Jacob's church are one of very few historic landmarks still visible in Znamensk

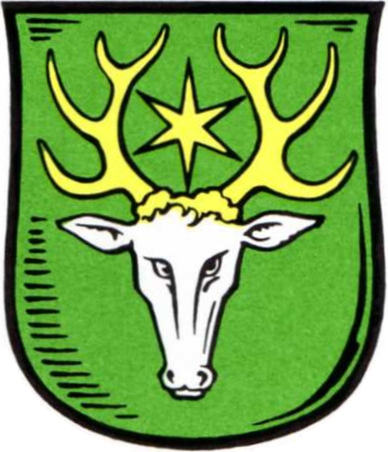
- Coat of arms
- Interactive map of Znamensk
- Location of Znamensk Znamensk (European Russia) Znamensk (Russia)
- Coordinates: 54°37′N 21°13′E
- Country: Russia
- Federal subject: Kaliningrad Oblast
- Administrative district: Gvardeysky District
- Founded: 1336 (Julian)
- Elevation: 4 m (13 ft)

Population (2010 Census)
  - Total: 4,036
  - Estimate (2021): 3,820 (−5.4%)
- Time zone: UTC+2 (MSK–1)
- Postal code: 238200
- OKTMO ID: 27706000126

Znamensk (Russian: Зна́менск; German: Wehlau [ˈveːlaʊ]; Polish: Welawa; Lithuanian: Vėluva) is a rural locality (a settlement) in Gvardeysky District of Kaliningrad Oblast, Russia, located on the right bank of the Pregolya River at its confluence with the Lava River 50 kilometers (31 mi) east of Kaliningrad. Population figures: 4,036 (2010 census); 4,302 (2002 census); 4,570 (1989 Soviet census).

== History ==
Map of Wehlau and surroundings (c. 1780)

The site of today's Znamensk was originally an Old Prussian fort, with a settlement named Velowe nearby. The site featured an unusually large oak tree, considered sacred by the local Prussians. It survived at least until 1595, when it was mentioned by Caspar Hennenberger.

Around 1255, the locality was fortified, but the castle was surrendered to the Teutonic Knights by its mayor, Tirslo. The Teutons continued to use the castle and began to colonize the region with Germans, giving the settlement the name Wehlau. It received its civic charter in 1335 and in 1339 and became a centre for horse stables and horse trade. Until the late 19th century, the town was allowed to organise a six-day linen fair, a three-day horse fair and two additional horse and cattle fairs every year. In 1349, Grand Master of the Teutonic Order Heinrich Dusemer founded a Franciscan Monastery there to commemorate his victory over the Prussians in the battle of Streba River. In 1380, the St. Jacob's church was erected.

Since 1440, the town was a founding member of the Prussian Confederation, which opposed Teutonic rule. In 1454, the Confederation asked Polish King Casimir IV Jagiellon to incorporate the region into the Kingdom of Poland, to which the King agreed and signed the act of incorporation. The castle and the town joined the Kingdom of Poland. During the subsequent Thirteen Years' War, in 1460 the Teutonic Order besieged the town and successfully retook it. The war ended in 1466 with the Second Peace of Toruń, according to which the town remained under the rule of the Teutonic Order as a fief of the Polish Crown. The town's seal was attached to the documents of the peace treaty. In 1490, Grand Master Johann von Tiefen restored (or founded, the sources are unclear) another Franciscan monastery in the town. However, it was destroyed in 1519 in the course of Protestant Reformation, when the burghers converted to Protestantism and decided that such a small town is not able to bear the burden of sustaining two monasteries.

In 1540, the town was destroyed by a large fire and only the St. Jacob's church was left standing. Wehlau was successfully rebuilt, although natural disasters struck it repeatedly, notably in 1542 and 1593. The town finally recovered and by the end of 16th century Margrave Georg Friedrich considered moving the University of Königsberg to Wehlau, which however never materialised. The town had a mixed population, and as of 1623, Polish and Lithuanian languages were required for the local teacher. In the Treaty of Wehlau signed in the town in 1657, Frederick William, Elector of Brandenburg, received sovereignty over the Duchy of Prussia.

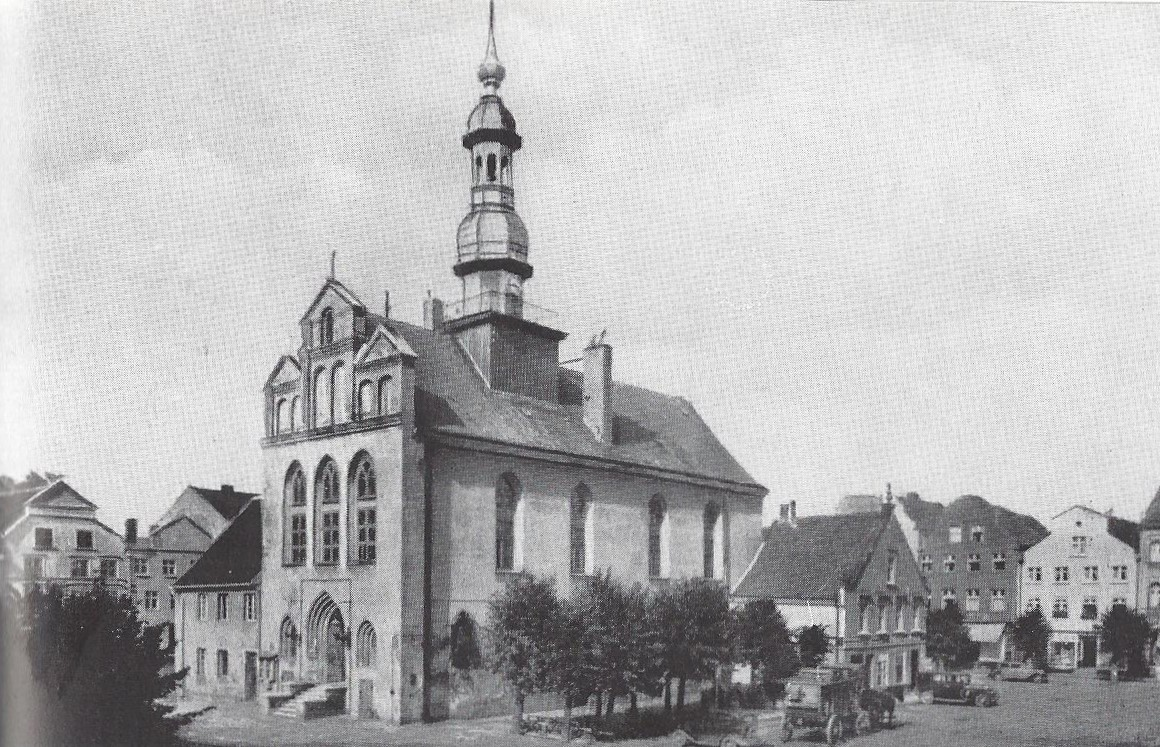
Market Square in the interbellum

In 1818, it became the seat of Landkreis Wehlau in East Prussia within the Kingdom of Prussia. In 1871, Wehlau joined the German Empire. By the end of the 19th century, the town had roughly 4,000 inhabitants, mostly German Lutherans. The town had a station of the Prussian Eastern Railway connecting Königsberg and Berlin to the Saint Petersburg–Warsaw Railway, as well as a Lutheran church, a regional courthouse and a school.

During World War II, the Germans operated three forced labour subcamps of the Stalag I-A prisoner-of-war camp in the town. Near the end of World War II, on 23 January 1945, the town was taken by troops of the 3rd Belorussian Front of the Red Army. The old town center was almost completely destroyed, and the German population fled during the evacuation of East Prussia or was expelled. It became part of the Kaliningrad Oblast and was renamed Znamensk, losing its civic rights in the process. It was demoted to a rural settlement in 2005 or 2006.

== Notable people ==
- Georg von Kunheim (1523–1611), noble
- Johann Christoph Strodtmann (1717–1756), writer
- Gustav Neumann, (1838–1881), chess player
- Ernst Vanhöffen (1858–1918), zoologist
- David Hilbert (1862–1943), mathematician
- Walter Schütz (1897–1933), politician
- Herbert Pilch (1927–2018), linguist

== See also ==
- Yasnaya Polyana, Kaliningrad Oblast
