= Echo des Ostens =

German communist newspaper (1922–1933)

- Editor-in-chief: Martin Hoffmann (1922-1926)
- Founded: 1922
- Ceased publication: 1933
- Political alignment: Communist
- Language: German language
- Headquarters: Königsberg
- Circulation: 22,800 (1930)
- OCLC number: 648876822

Echo des Ostens ('Echo of the East') was a newspaper published daily from Königsberg. It was the organ of the East Prussia district organization (Bezirk) of the Communist Party of Germany from 1922 to 1933. Echo des Ostens replaced an earlier Königsberg party publication, Die rote Fahne des Ostens. The young Martin Hoffmann was the editor of Echo des Ostens until 1926. As of 1930, it had an estimated circulation of 22,800.
