= Johann Christoph Strodtmann =

German writer (1717–1756)

Johann Christoph Strodtmann (1717–1756) was a German author, writing on theology, philology, classical studies, history of law and history of scholarship, active during the reign of Frederick II. Strodtmann was born in Wehlau (now Znamensk), East Prussia. He was a teacher and school headmaster, from 1750 until his death in 1756 at Osnabrück. He published a study of comparative religion in 1755, proposing that Germanic polytheism and the Israelite religion of the Hebrew Bible shared essential parallels (compare Urreligion). His Idioticon Osnabrugense, a glossary of the Westphalian dialect of Osnabrück, is a pioneering work of the dialectology of German.

== Works ==
- Beyträge zur Historie der Gelahrtheit (5 vols., Hamburg 1748–50)
- Neues Gelehrtes Europa (vols. 1–8, Wolfenbüttel 1752–1756)
- De iure curiali Litonico oder von Hofhörigen Rechten (Göttingen 1754)
- Uebereinstimmung der deutschen Alterthümer mit den biblischen, sonderlich hebräischen (Wolfenbüttel 1755)
- Idioticon Osnabrugense (1756)
