= Mykhailo Zhyznevskyi =

Belarusian pro-democracy activist and journalist (1988–2014)

Hero of Ukraine Mykhailo Zhyznevskyi
- Міхаіл Жызнеўскі (Belarusian); Михайло Жизневський (Ukrainian)
- Depiction of Mykhailo from 2018
- Born: 26 January 1988; Gomel, Byelorussian SSR, Soviet Union
- Died: 22 January 2014 (aged 25); Kyiv, Ukraine
- Cause of death: Gun shot (during Euromaidan)
- Citizenship: Belarus
- Occupation: Civic activist
- Known for: Hero of the Heavenly Hundred
- Political party: UNA-UNSO

Mіkhaіl Mikhaylavich Zhyznyewski (Belarusian: Міхаіл Міхайлавіч Жызнеўскі; 26 January 1988 – 22 January 2014), also known as Mykhailo Mykhailovych Zhyznevskyi (Ukrainian: Михайло Михайлович Жизневський), was a Belarusian Euromaidan activist, journalist, and a member of UNA-UNSO. He died in a confrontation on Hrushevsky Street in Kyiv, Ukraine in January 2014, during the Euromaidan protests. Posthumously, he was the first foreigner to be awarded Hero of Ukraine, Ukraine's highest award.

== Biography ==
He grew up in the village of Stsyah Pratsy in the Homel region, Belarus. He studied at the Homel school № 15 in the military class. After the tenth grade he went to school to study to be a gas welder. He made medieval armor in the Knights' Club, practiced karate and attended the Orthodox Church. He planned to serve in the army, and then go to Zhyrovichy Monastery.

On September 11, 2005, at age 17, he ran away from home and emigrated to Ukraine. He told UNSO friends that he had left due to political persecution by the Belarusian KGB. In Belarus, he was declared wanted, believing that he was hiding from the army. In Ukraine he was not known by his real name, he went by Alexei or Loki, in honor of the god of Norse mythology. He did not communicate with his family in Belarus for a long time, but in the last year of his life he resumed contacts with his parents. He met with them in Kyiv and planned to come home in the spring of 2014. In 2012, Zhyzneuski came to the police station in Ukraine, showed documents and said that there was no need to look for him.

He was interested in history, mythology, chivalry, military affairs, and airsoft. He believed that it was easier for him to live and work in Ukraine than in Belarus.

In Ukraine he lived first in Donetsk and Kryvyi Rih, then in Kyiv. In the last years of his life he rented a house in Bila Tserkva. He worked as a welder and window installer. He was a freelance correspondent for Soborna Kyivshchyna newspaper and loved journalism. He was apolitical, but cooperated with the far-right nationalist organization UNA-UNSO, because it had a good airsoft team.

== Participation in Euromaidan ==
He took part in Euromaidan from the first days at the call of UNA-UNSO. He was a member of Maidan Self-Defense, participated in the protection of Maidan facilities, was on duty in tents, and assisted in the work of UNA-UNSO. He was considered one of the most active members of the organization. During the last two weeks of his life he collected information for Soborna Kyivshchyna. He died on January 22, 2014, at about 9 am from a shot in the heart near the Dynamo Stadium on Hrushevsky Street. Zhyzneuski's father expressed doubts that the perpetrators of the murder would be found. He suggested that his son had been killed by a sniper, but believed that neither the Ukrainian nor the Belarusian authorities would conduct an objective investigation. Zhyzneuski's death was not commented on at the Belarusian embassy.

== Legacy ==
Zhyzneuski's name is engraved at the Monument to the Belarusians who died for Ukraine in Kyiv.

In 2020, the Rada of the Belarusian Democratic Republic posthumously awarded Mikhail Zhyzneuski with the Medal of the Order of the Pahonia.
