= Hero of Ukraine =

Highest state award of Ukraine

Hero of Ukraine Герой України
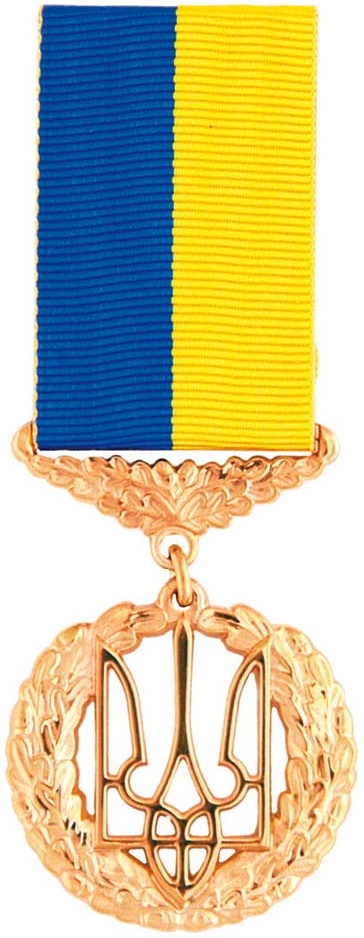
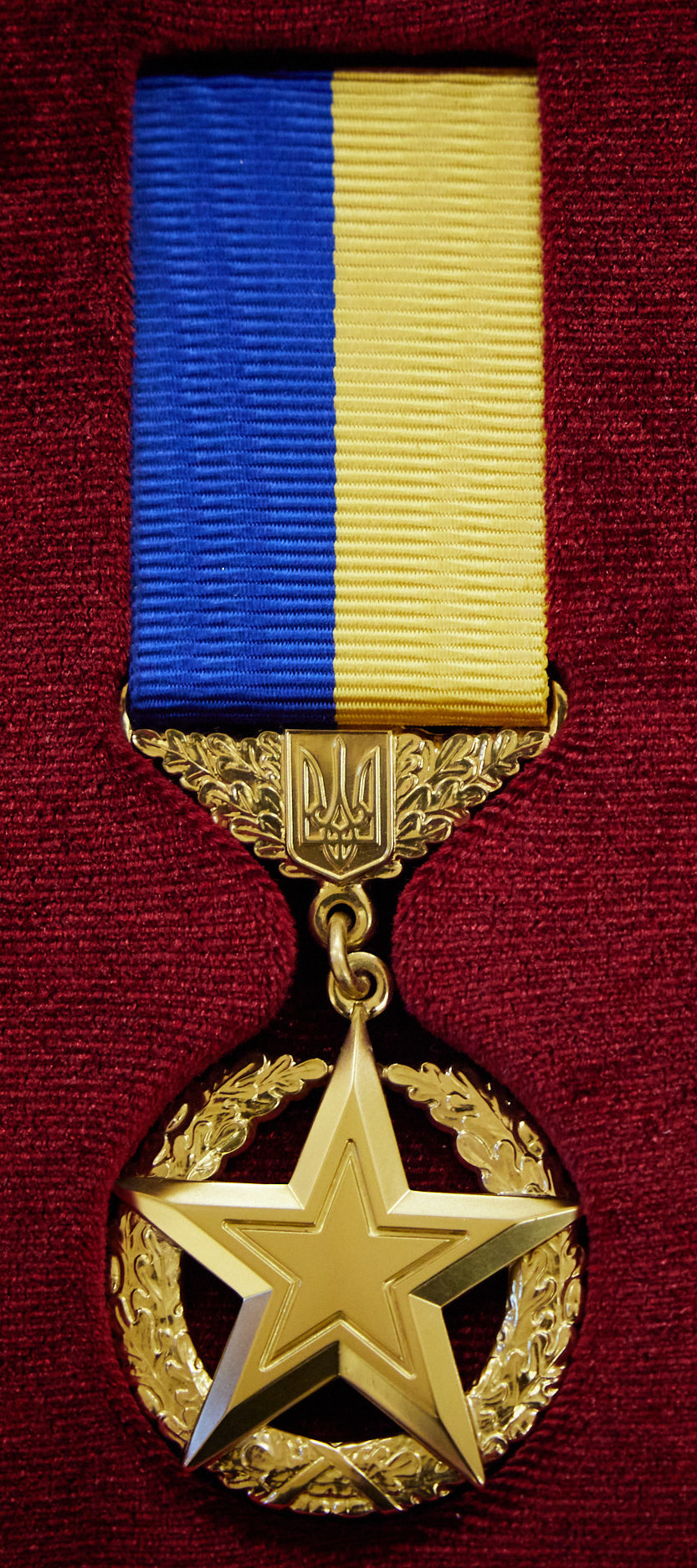
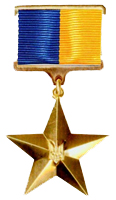
- Order of the State (left), Order of the Gold Star (centre), miniature medal (right)

Awarded by the President of Ukraine
- Type: National order
- Eligibility: Citizens of Ukraine
- Awarded for: "Personal heroism and great labor achievements"
- Status: Active
- Grades: Order of the State (HOU); Order of the Gold Star (HOU)

Statistics
- First induction: 26 November 1998
- Last induction: 30 October 2026
- Total inductees: no less than 1376

Precedence
- Next (higher): None
- Next (lower): Cross of Military Merit (Ukraine)
- Ribbon bar of the award

A Hero of Ukraine (abbr. HOU; Ukrainian: Герой України, romanized: Heroi Ukrainy) is the highest national decoration that can be conferred upon an individual citizen by the president of Ukraine.

The decoration was created in 1998 by President Leonid Kuchma. As of October 31, 2026, the total number of recipients was no less than 1,376 (of which decrees awarding 1,327 individuals were published, and for at least 49 individuals, the decrees were not made public).

The decoration is granted to two classes of recipients: to civilians, the Order of the State (abbr. OS, Ukrainian: Орден Держави, romanized: Orden Derzhavy); and to military recipients, the Order of the Gold Star (abbr. OGS, Орден «Золота Зірка», Orden "Zolota Zirka").

The first foreigner awarded the decoration was Belarusian Mykhailo Zhyznevskyi in June 2017.

== History ==
The origin of the "Hero of Ukraine" award can be traced to the Hero of the Soviet Union (established 16 April 1934) and the Hero of Socialist Labor (27 December 1938), the highest decorations established in the Soviet Union, of which Ukraine was a constituent republic. Most of the recipients of the former title received it for heroic military action (with Soviet cosmonauts being a notable exception), while those awarded the latter were recognized for their contributions to national economy and culture. The awards could be given to the same individual more than once, and only the Presidium of the Supreme Soviet could deprive a recipient of the award once given. After the dissolution of the Soviet Union in 1991, similar awards were created in the resulting independent countries, including Ukraine.

== Creation ==
The title Hero of Ukraine was created on 23 August 1998 with Edict #944/98 by President Leonid Kuchma. Similar in structure to the titles issued by the Soviet Union, the title is awarded in two distinctions: "The Order of the Gold Star" and "The Order of the State". Unlike the Soviet awards, Ukrainian law allows a person to receive a title in each distinction only once, although the person may receive both levels in due course. This means that if a holder of the Order of the State performs a heroic action, he or she can be presented with the Order of the Gold Star. Vice versa, if labor achievements of a holder of the Order of the Gold Star are recognized to be of exceptional value to the nation, the recipient can be eligible to receive the Order of the State. Either of the distinctions can be presented posthumously, and a hero may only have his title removed by the president if they are convicted of a serious crime.

== Design ==
Two medals were created by Ukrainian law to differentiate between the titles. They have several common features; both medals use a ribbon 45 mm (1.8 in) long and 28 mm (1.1 in) wide and are divided equally into two bands along its length, with a blue band on the left and a yellow band on the right, matching the colors of the Ukrainian flag. Connected to the ribbon is a suspension device joined to a medallion, both of which are made out of gold. On both medals, the name of each decoration and the award number are engraved on the reverse side of the medallion.

Below the ribbon of the Order of the Gold Star, the golden suspension device contains a small engraving of the trident representing the Ukrainian Coat of Arms. The medallion is shaped like a five-pointed star 35 mm (1.4 in) wide from one point to the other, and is set within a wreath of oak leaves. Two smaller five-pointed stars are engraved within the larger star. In contrast, the medallion for the Order of the State has the trident of Prince Volodymyr of Kyiv (St. Vladimir) placed on top of a wreath of oak leaves. The size of the medallion is 35 mm (1.4 in) high and 36 mm (1.4 in) wide. There is no special design or symbol engraved on the suspension device. In addition to the formal award, recipients of either level are given a copy for use in public. Only one design of the wearer's copy exists, being modeled after the Soviet hero medal with the red ribbon replaced by a blue and yellow ribbon. The trident, which is used on the coat of arms of Ukraine, is placed in the middle of the star. This medal is made out of non-precious metals and is worn on the wearer's left-hand side above all other decorations.

== Regulations ==
Two different regulations were issued by President Kuchma: the edict of 1998 and a new edict in 2002. The edict of 2002 voided the edict of 1998 as it was issued after the law on state awards and confirmed the status of the title in 2000.

The 1998 edict contained general guidelines about the title. Some of the subjects mentioned were the criteria for receiving each level of the title, who can present the title, and how the medal should be displayed in public. The decree specified the title as being awarded to citizens of Ukraine for heroism and labor achievements. It stipulated that only the president could award the title, though certain other bodies of the Ukrainian Government could recommend people to receive it. The edict also allowed for special benefits, including increased pay, social security, and health care, which heroes could use until their death. The decree also covered the topics of duplicate medals and the display, ownership and storage of the insignia.

The new 2002 regulations differ only slightly from the original ones. The designs of the medals were not changed, the new edict introduced the measurements of the miniature medal, or the "wearer's copy". Article 4 outlines the details on the ownership of the insignia and special procedures for the medals to be displayed in museums.

=== Display ===
The medal, which is presented with the title, is always worn on the left side of a business or suit jacket and is worn above any other medals and decorations awarded by Ukraine. If a person has been awarded both levels of the title then the Order of the Gold Star medal is placed to the right of the Order of the State medal. A copy of the medal, made out of non-precious metals, can be presented to the hero for daily wear that can be substituted with a ribbon bar, measuring 12 mm (0.47 in) x 18 mm (0.71 in), if wearing the medal is not permitted. Another copy of the decoration, called the miniature badge, is worn above the ribbon bars on the left side of the uniform.

== Procedure ==
In order for a person to be awarded the title, a recommendation must be made to the President by either the Verkhovna Rada (parliament of Ukraine), the Cabinet of Ukraine (Government of Ukraine), the Constitutional Court, the Supreme Court, the Higher Economic Court, the Office of the Prosecutor General of Ukraine, ministries and other central executive authorities, the Supreme Council and the Council of Ministers of the Autonomous Republic of Crimea, oblast, Kyiv and Sevastopol city state administrations, or the Commission on state awards and heraldry of the President of Ukraine.

The recommendations are then sent to the President for consideration, along with a package composed of the details of the nominee's deeds and the recommendations that have been filed on his or her behalf. If the President agrees with the recommendation, he will issue a decree to award the person the title, which includes receiving a medal, miniature badge and certificate at a ceremony at the Presidential Palace in Kyiv.

== Recipients ==
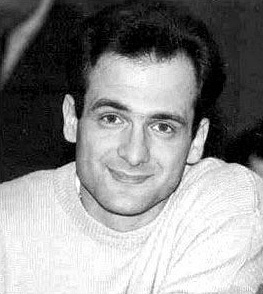
Georgiy Gongadze, journalist, founder of a popular Internet newspaper Ukrainska Pravda, who was kidnapped and murdered in 2000

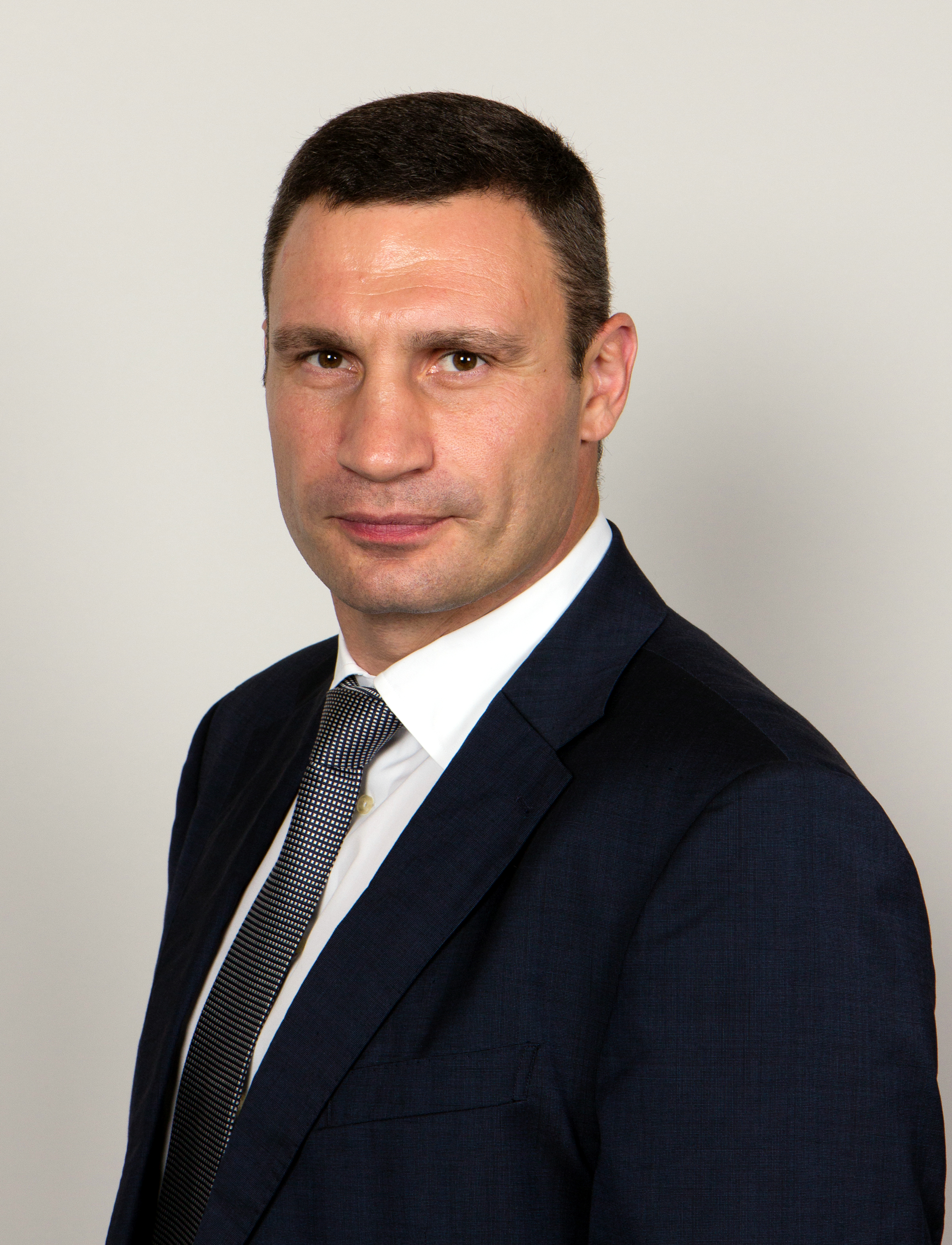
Vitali Klitschko

Recipients have been awarded the title, Hero of Ukraine, for a variety of accomplishments. The first to receive the title—in 1998—was Borys Paton. He was recognised for studies in metallurgy of electrical welding and was President of the National Academy of Sciences of Ukraine from 1962 until his death in 2020. Other science-related honors were given to Platon Kostyuk, for his work in neurophysiology, and Valerii Kazakov for his work in medicine.

The title is often awarded to athletes and other sports-related personalities. Vitali Klitschko, a heavyweight boxing champion was given the level "Order of the Gold Star" in 2004 as was Andriy Shevchenko, 2004 European Footballer of the Year and two-time winner of the Serie A scoring title. Valeriy Lobanovskyi, the former coach of the football club FC Dynamo Kyiv, died on 13 May 2002 in hospital after he passed out during a game. He was awarded the title two days later "for his years of service to Ukraine for the development of football inside the nation and also improving national prestige."

Olympic medalists are also prominent winners. Yana Klochkova, who won gold medals in swimming at the Athens and Sydney Olympic Games was awarded the title "in recognition of Klochkova's outstanding services to Ukraine and her efforts to build up the country's reputation in the Olympic arena."

People involved in the arts and literature have also received the award. Renowned Ukrainian composer, Oleksandr Bilash, was awarded in 2001 for "outstanding personal contribution to the enrichment of the spiritual treasures of the Ukrainian people and many years of fruitful creative activity". Sofia Rotaru, arguably the best-known popular singer from Ukraine in the former Soviet Union, received her award "for outstanding personal merits in the sphere of art". Writer Pavlo Zahrebelnyi was awarded in 2004 "for "self-sacrifice for Ukraine, and for many years of writing and significant personal contributions toward the enrichment of the national spiritual treasury". Writers involved in politics are not excluded either; Georgiy Gongadze, a journalist who was kidnapped and murdered in 2000, was awarded in 2005.

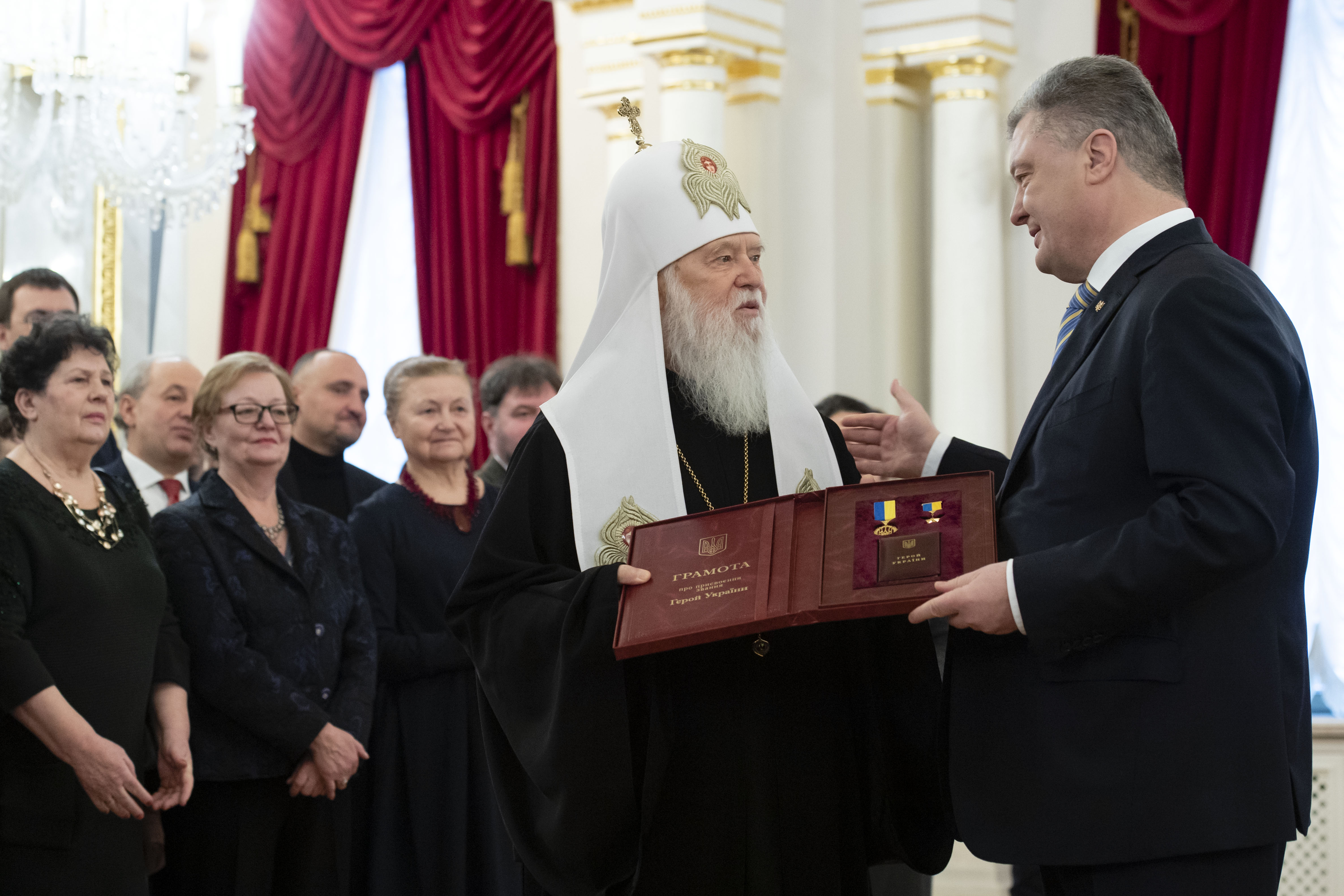
President Poroshenko handing the medal of Hero of Ukraine and the Order of the State to Filaret.

In January 2022, captain Dmytro Kotsiubailo "Da Vinci" commander of the 1st Mechanized Battalion of the Armed Forces of Ukraine and member of far-right party Right Sector was awarded the title Hero of Ukraine by the president of Ukraine Volodymyr Zelenskyy.

Belarusian Mikhail Zhyzneuski became the first foreigner awarded the award in June 2017. Zhyzneuski was one of the first protesters killed during the Euromaidan protests; he was shot dead on 22 January 2014.

Vasily Ignatenko was a firefighter who fought the fire caused by the Chernobyl nuclear disaster. He died on the 13th of may 1986 from acute radiation syndrome at hospital #6 in Moscow. in 2006 he was posthumously awarded the Hero of Ukraine by the then president Viktor Yushchenko.

For "his outstanding historical role in the establishment of the independent Orthodox Church of Ukraine, activities aimed at reviving the spirituality of the Ukrainian people, raising the authority of Orthodoxy, establishing ideals of mercy and interfaith harmony" and because he "was, is and remains the spiritual leader of the Ukrainian church, the spiritual leader of the Ukrainian people", Patriarch Filaret received the award on 8 January 2019. On 22 January, on the Ukrainian Unity Day, President Petro Poroshenko handed the medal to Filaret.

On 24 February 2022, during the attack on Snake Island, 13 Ukrainian State Border Guards were ordered by the Russian warship Moskva to surrender or the ship would open fire. The border guards refused to surrender, responding with "Russian warship, go fuck yourself". The Russian warship opened fire soon after with a bombardment that was initially believed to have killed all 13 guards; President Zelenskyy then announced that all 13 soldiers would receive the title of "Hero of Ukraine" posthumously, although the State Border Guard Service of Ukraine said a few days later that it had a "strong belief" that the men had survived to receive the award.

== Controversial awards ==
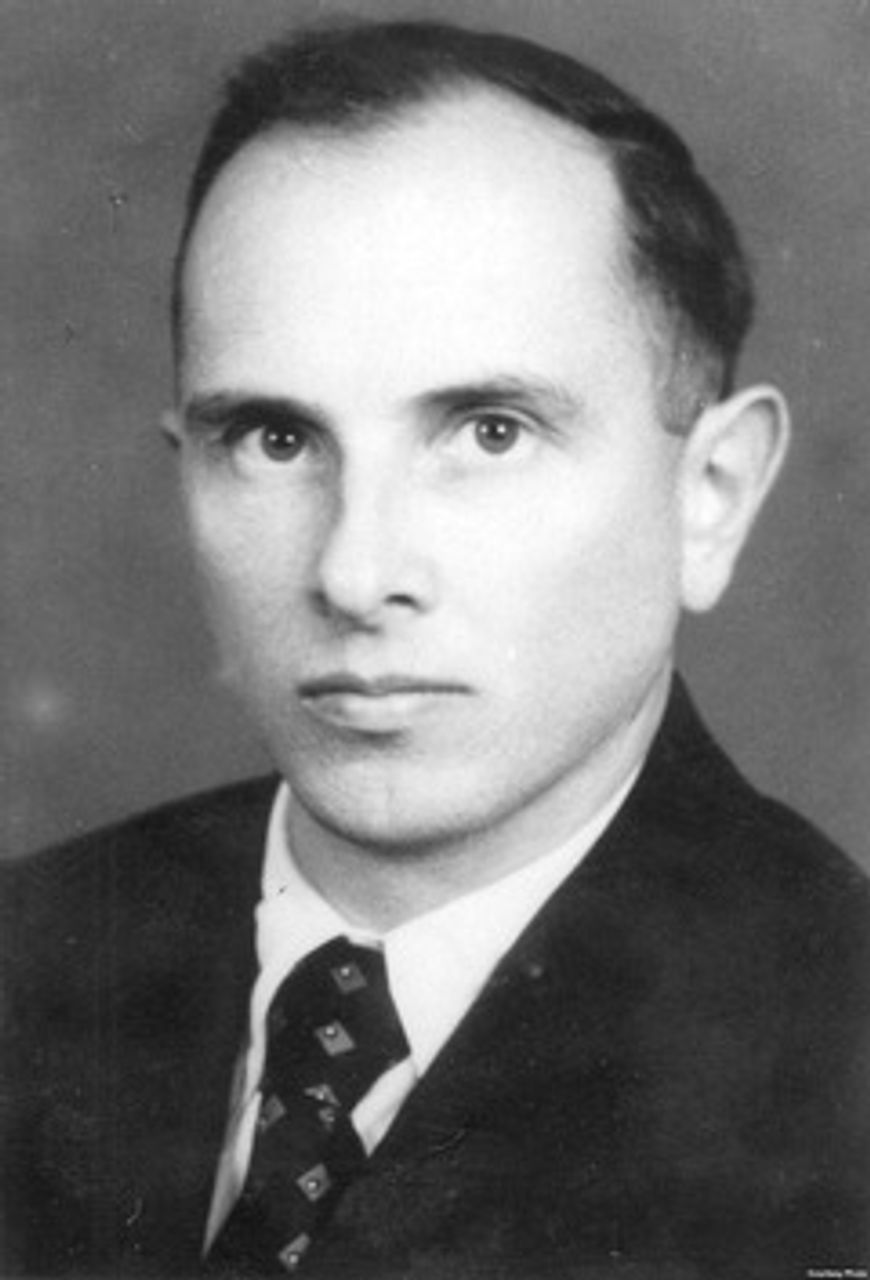
The decision to give the award to Stepan Bandera was met with controversy, and it was later revoked.

The decision by Viktor Yushchenko, in his last days in office in January 2010, to award World War II Ukrainian nationalist leader Stepan Bandera with the Hero of Ukraine caused an uproar in Russia, Poland, and other countries, including Ukraine itself. It was condemned by the Simon Wiesenthal Center and other Jewish groups around the world, Polish President Lech Kaczyński, the Russian Foreign Ministry, Soviet Army veteran groups, and prominent Ukrainian politicians such as Sergei Tigipko and Konstantin Zarudnev. Zarudnev, an MP representing Sevastopol, went as far as burning his Ukrainian passport in protest. At the same time the decree that had given Bandera the award was applauded by Ukrainian nationalists in western Ukraine and by a number of Ukrainian-Americans. On 2 April 2010, a district administrative court in Donetsk cancelled the presidential decree that had granted the Hero of Ukraine title to Bandera. Lawyer Vladimir Olentsevych argued in a lawsuit that the title of Hero of Ukraine is the highest state award granted exclusively to citizens of Ukraine. Bandera was not a Ukrainian citizen, as he was in exile after World War II, and was killed in 1959 in Germany before the 1991 Act of Declaration of Independence of Ukraine. For the same reasons the Donetsk Administrative Court of Appeals on 21 April 2010 declared unlawful a decree of 12 October 2007 by then–Ukrainian President Yushchenko to award the Hero of Ukraine title to Roman Shukhevych, the commander of the Ukrainian Insurgent Army.

On 12 August 2010, the High Administrative Court of Ukraine dismissed suits to declare four decrees by President Viktor Yanukovych on awarding the Hero of Ukraine title to Soviet soldiers illegal and cancel them. The filer of these suits stated they were based on the same arguments used by Donetsk Administrative Court of Appeals that on 21 April satisfied an appeal that deprived Roman Shukhevych the Hero of Ukraine title, as Shukhevych was not a citizen of Ukraine.
