= Kyiv Independence Day Parade =

Annual celebration in the capital of Ukraine

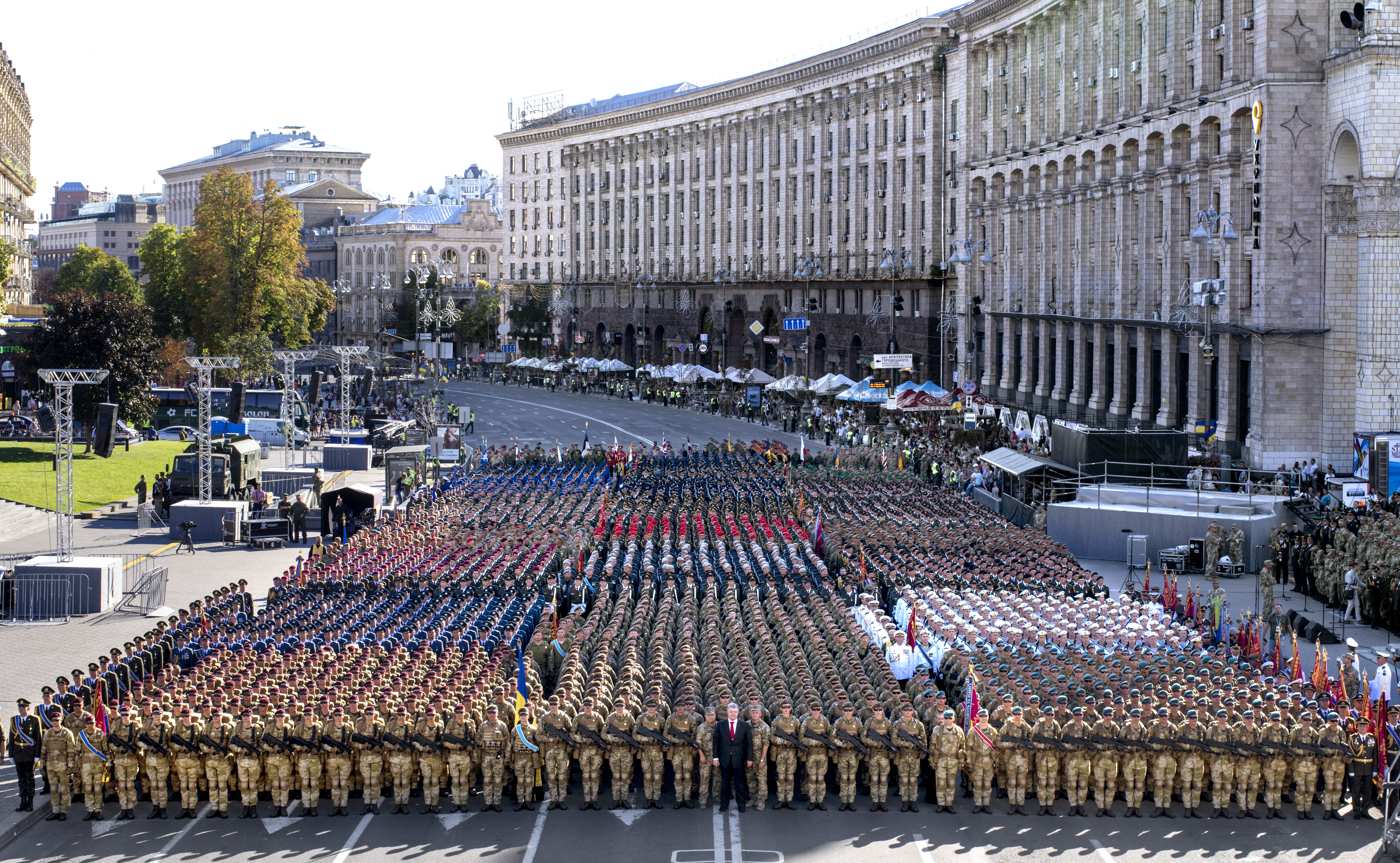
- Ukrainian President Petro Poroshenko in a photo with participants of the Kyiv Independence Day Parade in 2018.
- Genre: Military parades
- Begins: August 24, 10am
- Frequency: irregular
- Venue: Maidan Nezalezhnosti (Independence Square)
- Location: Kyiv
- Country: Ukraine
- Inaugurated: 1994
- Previous event: 2021
- Next event: Unknown
- Organiser: Ministry of Defence

The Kyiv Independence Day Parade (Ukrainian: Парад в Києві на честь Дня Незалежності України, romanized: Parad v Kyievi na chest Dnia Nezalezhnosti Ukrainy) has been the main event of various celebrations of the Independence Day of Ukraine, which is celebrated annually in Kyiv on August 24.

== 20th century ==
The first parade in honor of Independence Day was held on Khreschatyk Street in 1994 on the country's third anniversary. The parade commander was the head of the Kyiv Military District Ivan Bizhan and inspecting the parade was the Defense Minister Vitaly Radetsky. It was then held off and on in different formats. A large-scale aviation show on Independence Day took place at Kyiv Chaika Airfield in 1997, featuring flypasts by personnel of the Ukrainian Air Force in first participation of air component of the ZSU equipment. In 1998, the parade included military army vehicles for the first time since 1990. The last parade of the century was in 1999.

== 21st century ==
=== 2001 ===
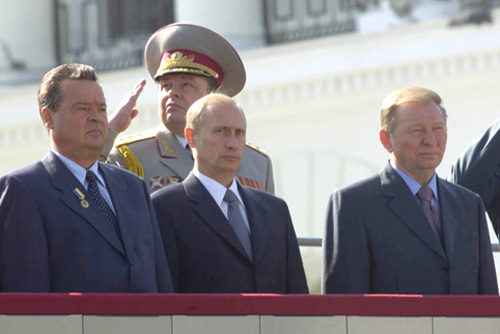
Russian President Putin and Ukrainian President Kuchma during the Independence Day Parade in 2001.

On its 10th anniversary of independence of 2001, Kyiv held its largest parade at the time. 173 pieces of equipment and 6,530 soldiers took part in the parade. Soldiers, who were dressed in old Cossack uniforms, were also at the parade. A new column of T-84s, took part in the parade for the first time. For the first time, there were parades in Lviv and Vinnytsia, Odessa, Chernihiv and Sevastopol. Russian president Vladimir Putin, Polish president Aleksander Kwaśniewski, and Macedonian president Boris Trajkovski attended the parade. It was inspected by Minister of Defense Oleksandr Kuzmuk.

=== 2003 ===
The 2003 parade, marking the 12th anniversary of independence, included more than 5,000 soldiers from 16 battalions. The National Anthem was performed by a Ukrainian folk artist Ivo Bobul. Also first time as official title performed the march «Kozatska slava» (Viktor Lisovol). The parade did not include military equipment. The 2003 Commander was the Chief of the Kyiv Garrison Colonel-General Petro Shulyak. Inspecting the parade was Defense Minister Yevhen Marchuk.

=== 2004 ===
The 2004 parade did not use military equipment. 19 battalions of soldiers took part in the parade. Officers who participated in the parade received a commemorative badge in honor of the 23rd anniversary of independence. The parade was inspected by Defense Minister Yevhen Marchuk. The commander of the parade was Mukola Petruk.

=== 2008 ===
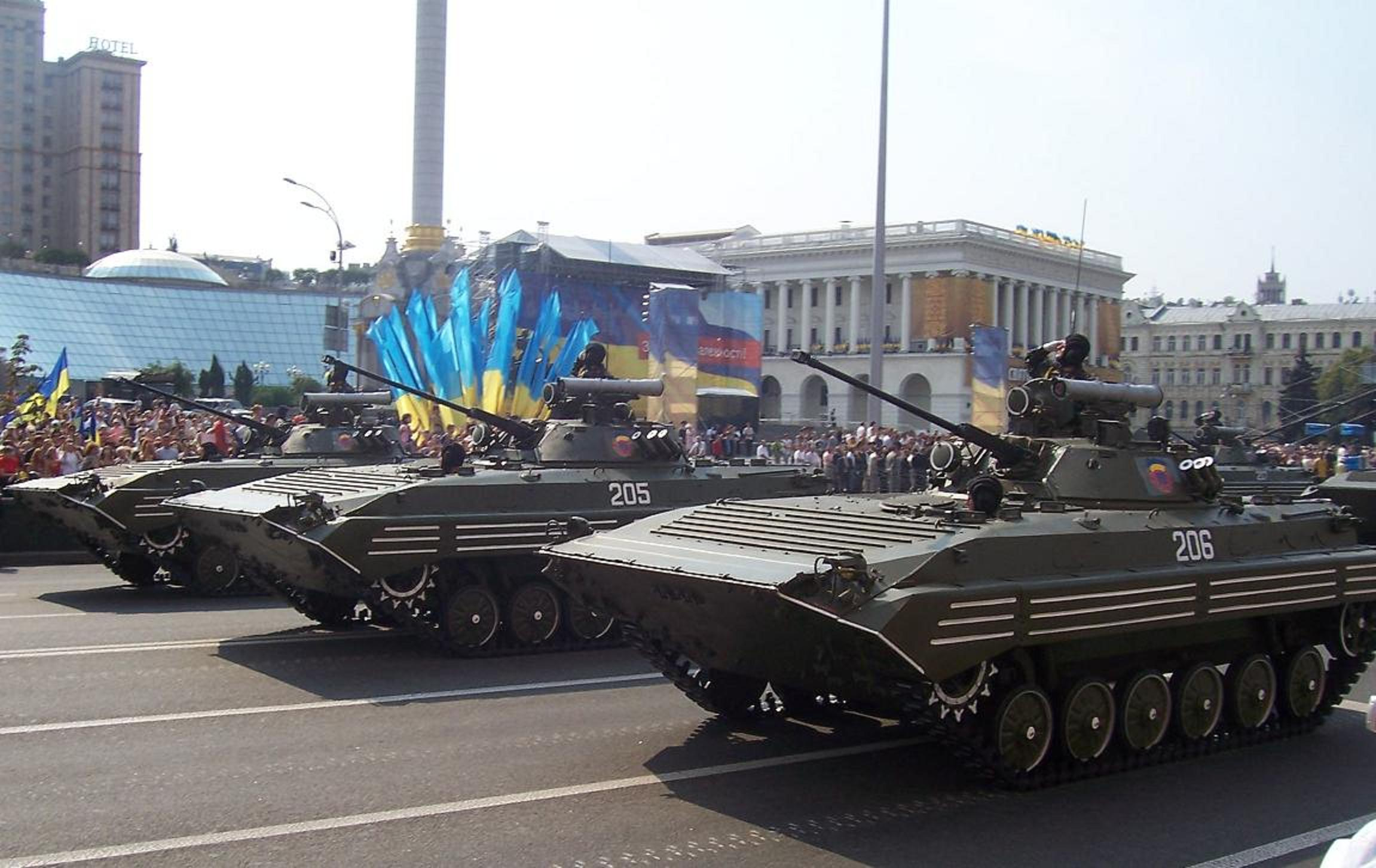
Ukrainian BMP-2 infantry fighting vehicles on parade in 2008

This parade was the first one since 2004 due to lack of funds for the parades. This parade celebrated the 17th anniversary of independence. Participating in the parade were 144 ground units, 22 aircraft, 8 helicopters, and over 3.5 thousand troops.

=== 2009 ===
In 2009, 3,400 soldiers marched on Khreshchatyk in honor of the 18th anniversary of independence. Thirty-five planes, including bombers, attack aircraft and combat helicopters flew over the capital during the parade. The highlight of the parade was the Antonov planes flying overhead. The musical accompaniment was provided by the Massed Bands, which composed of 19 independent bands. Commanding the parade was the Ground Forces of Ukraine Colonel-General Ivan Svyda. The parade was inspected by the Chief of General Staff General of the Army Sergey Kirichenko.

=== 2014 ===
The 2014 parade was led by Lieutenant-General Anatoly Pushnyakov. It was inspected by Defense Minister Valeriy Heletey. The capital was lined up with 50 pieces of military equipment, including new models of the BTR-3E and the "Wasp" anti-aircraft gun. More than a thousand troops from the Armed Forces, Interior Ministry and State Border Service took part in the parade. 120 of the 1,500 participants were participants in the Anti-Terrorist Operation in Eastern Ukraine. Many denounced the parade as a waste of money and as an inappropriate event during the War in Donbas. There was a moment of silence to remember the "Heavenly Hundred" who died during the Maidan Revolution of 2013 and 2014.

=== 2015 ===
The parade went without the participation of military vehicles. In President Poroshenko's speech he mentioned the Battle of Ilovaisk and promised to not forgive those responsible. At the same time, he called the Minsk II protocol "uncontested". There were 2,300 soldiers participating in the parade. Fourteen units carried battle flags of honor with the combat banner "For courage and bravery".

=== 2016 ===
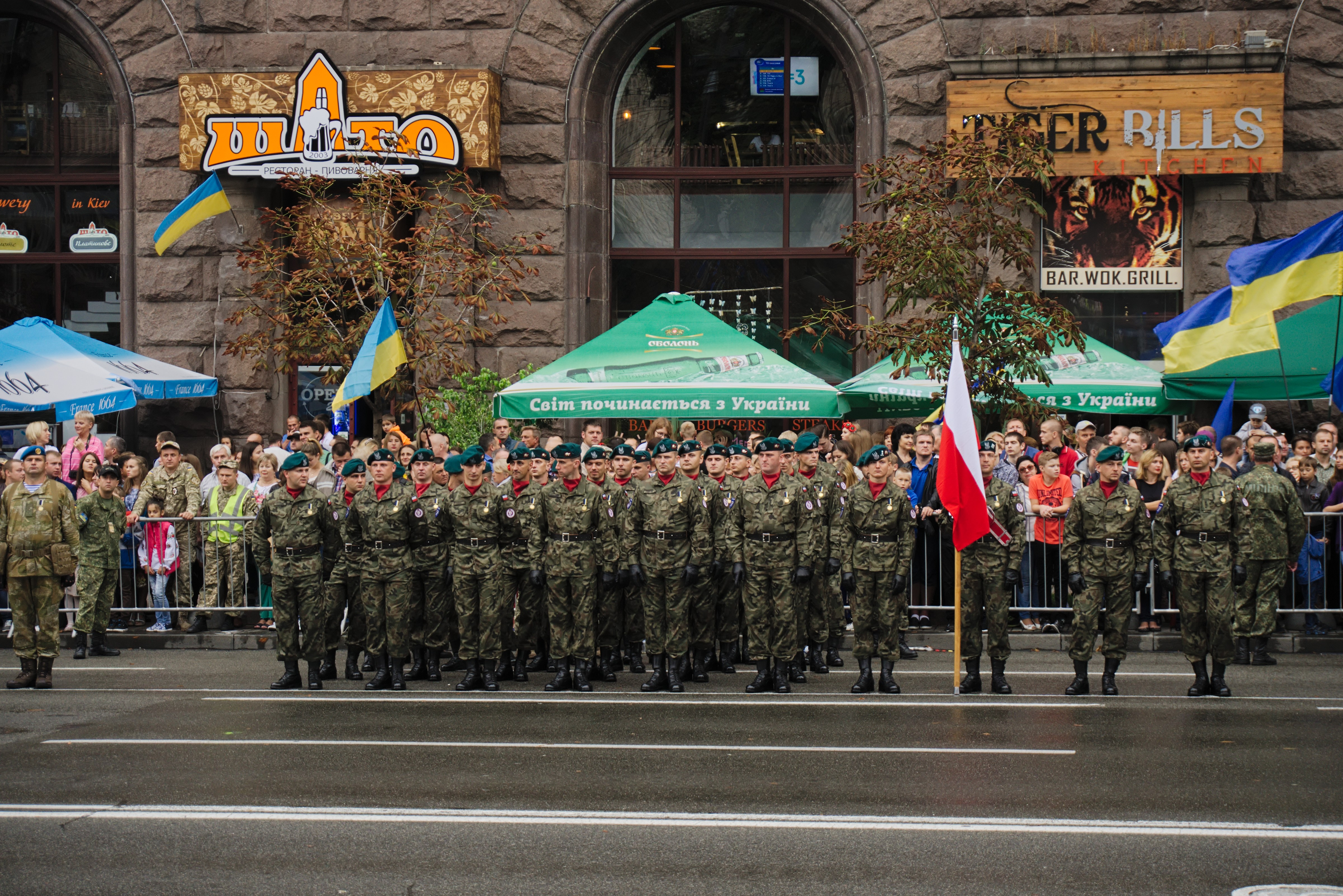
Members of the Polish-Lithuanian-Ukrainian Brigade in on the street during the 2016 parade.

2016 celebrated the 25th anniversary of Ukraine's independence. The parade involved more than 4,000 soldiers of the Armed Forces, and over 200 pieces of military equipment. The parade commander was Lt. General Serhiy Popko. The soldiers paraded in the new model uniforms which incorporate details from the uniforms worn by the Ukrainian People's Army. Participants of parade honored the dead Ukrainian heroes. A minute of silence was accompanied by the folk song A Duck is Floating. The celebrations were attended by the President of Poland Andrzej Duda. Also participating in the parade was the Lithuanian–Polish–Ukrainian Brigade.

Many changes took place in the musical accompaniment, particularly when the German made Unter dem Siegesbanner by Franz von Blon accompanied the march of the foreign delegation, as well as when the traditional Red Cranberry & For Ukraine was replaced by the theme from Ukraine (by Taras Petrynenko) as the presidential fanfare.The opening inspection of troops was also accompanied by a new piece of music which was adapted to fit a military march, Zporiz'kyy March by Mykola Lysenko.

=== 2017 ===
In 2017, the parade celebrated the 26th anniversary of Ukraine's independence. 4,500 troops participated in the parade, along with 9 formations from NATO allied countries The Secretary of Defense of the United States, and the Defense ministers of Georgia, Lithuania, Latvia, Moldova, Poland, Montenegro, Estonia, and the United Kingdom attended the ceremony.

Also there was a military equipment exhibition on Mikhaylivska Square.

- For the first time in the parade the colour of the 3rd Iron Rifle Division of the Ukrainian People's Army (of the Ukrainian People's Republic) - one of the most famous combat units of the times of the Ukrainian War of Independence (1917–21) was officially displayed.
- For the first time in the parade the colour of the 1st Ukrainian regiment of the Bohdan Khmelnitsky which was formed in Kyiv in May 1917, who fought in the Army of the Ukrainian People's Republic also was paraded.
- Military units were officially given names of historical figures:
  - 72nd Mechanized Brigade received the name of the military formation of the Ukrainian People's Republic Army — Black Zaporozhians,
  - 24th Mechanized Brigade received the name of King Danylo.

Also, two other units were given honorary titles: Hetman Ivan Vyhovsky, under whose leadership the Cossacks defeated the Tsardom of Russia army near Konotop in 1659.

=== 2018 ===
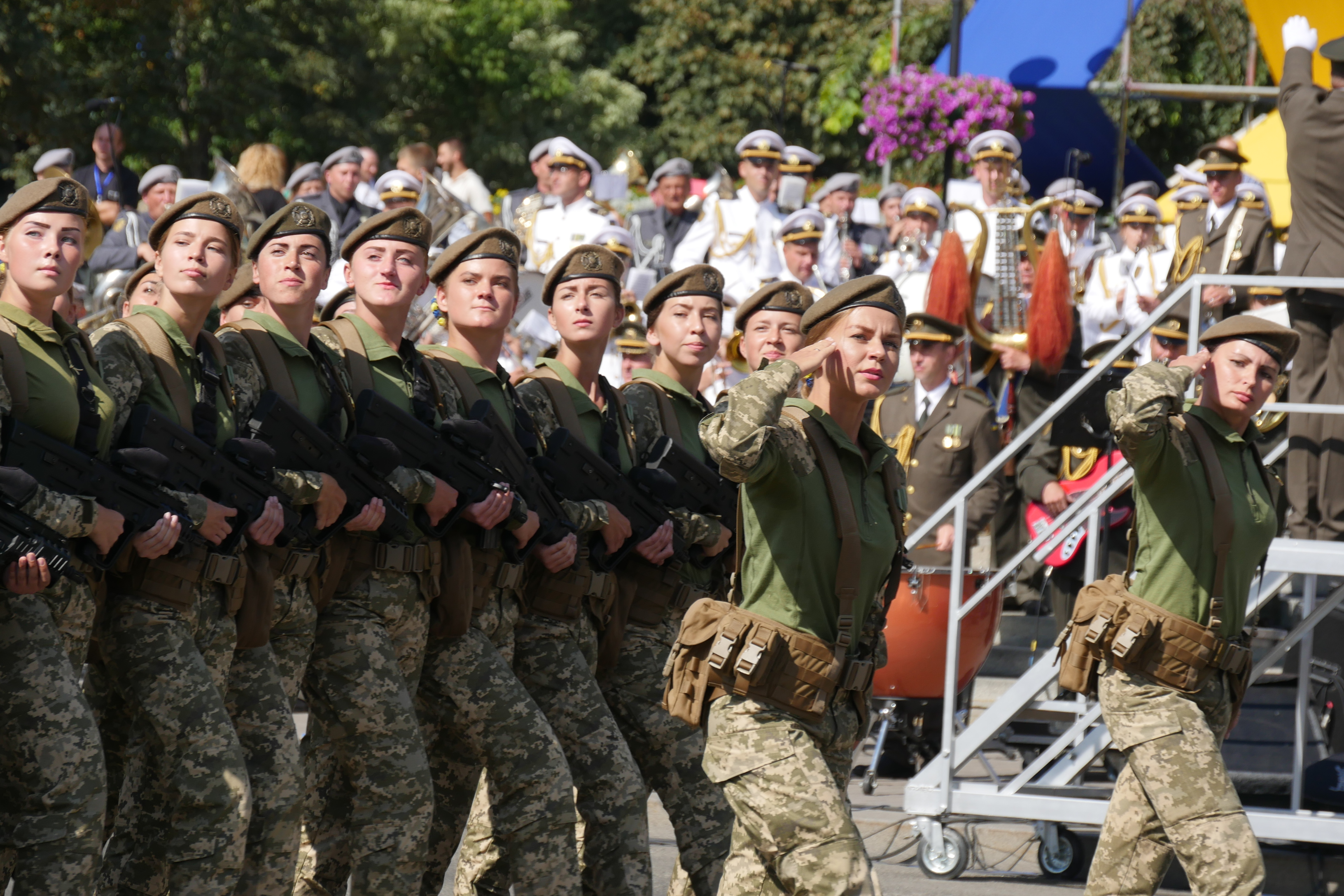
The 2018 parade included a women's battalion for the first time since independence.

The 2018 parade took place on the occasion of the 27th anniversary of Ukraine's independence, as well as the centennial anniversary of the founding of the Ukrainian People's Republic. The parade was expected to demonstrate more than 200 new models military hardware in the mobile column.

The Ukrainian military included a battalion of 120 female military personnel in the parade for the first time since its inception. The unit comprised cadets from the Taras Shevchenko National University Military Institute and the Military Institute of Telecommunications and Information Technologies. Their appearance as they marched along Khreshchatyk was greeted with loud applause from the spectators.

The parade was also the first to use "Glory to Ukraine" and "Glory to the Heroes" as the official greeting of the parade formations. Also, a number of Armed Forces units were granted unit honorifics honoring Ukrainian War of Independence figures and battles and important Ukrainian military heroes.

=== 2019 ===
The Independence Day in 2019 was celebrated with two separate marches, one of which was unofficial. The new President Volodymyr Zelenskyy refused to hold a military parade, which provoked the disagreement of veteran and volunteer organizations, and already on July 10, the preparation of an alternative parade was announced. The active preparation for the alternative parade prompted the President to change his position and announce the preparation of official events called the "March of Dignity".

=== 2021 ===
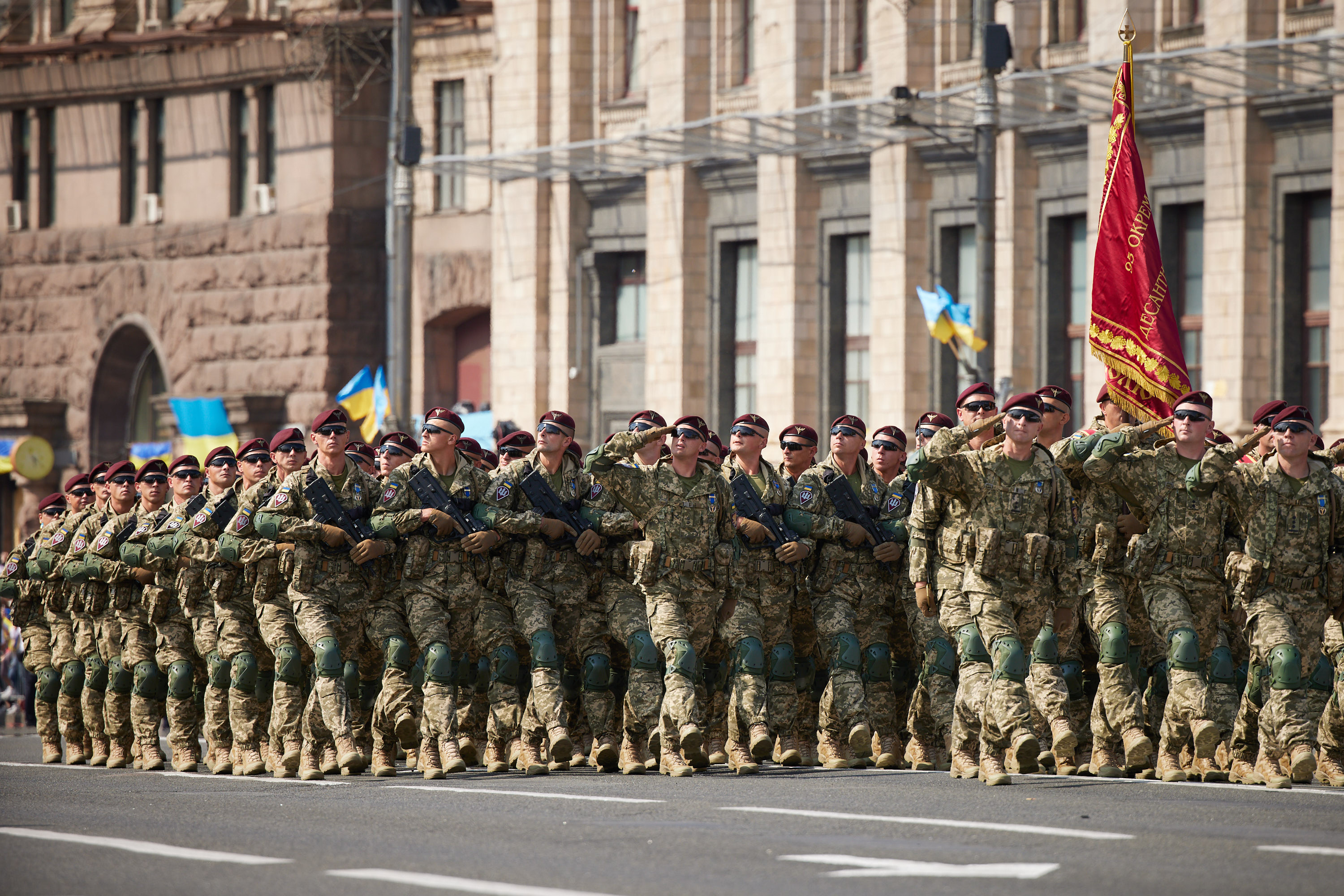
Ukrainian Air Assault Forces marching along Khreshchatyk during the military parade dedicated to the 30th anniversary of Ukrainian independence, 24 August 2021

According to a 21 October 2020 decree by President Zelenskyy on Independence Day 2021 a military parade was held on the occasion of the 30th anniversary of Ukrainian independence. The parade was considered to be, the words of defense minister Andriy Taran, a break from the "Sovietness" of previous parades and a demonstration of the country's "commitment to NATO standards". As part of this, a new way to march was implemented, in which the servicemen have already raising the leg by five centimeters.

The following foreign dignitaries attended the parade:

- Bartholomew I of Constantinople
- Lithuanian president Gitanas Nauseda
- Moldovan president Maia Sandu
- Polish President Andrzej Duda
- Macedonian President Stevo Pendarovski
- Estonian President Kersti Kaljulaid
- Latvian President Egils Levits
- French Foreign Minister Jean-Yves Le Drian

Many dignitaries attended in connection with the Crimea Platform held the previous day, including representatives of 46 states.

During the preceding ceremony, a theatrical performance referred to as "DNA" presented the history of Ukraine from the Kyivan Rus’ to modern Ukraine the Cossack era, literary Ukraine. At the outset, a 30 meter long flag of Ukraine held by soldiers marched first in front a veterans contingent. Foreign participants in the march-past, fly-past, and a flotilla off the coast of Odesa included Canada, Denmark, Estonia, Georgia, the United Kingdom, and the United States. In the National Guard of Ukraine and border guards contingents, canine units were used for the first time. It demonstrated the latest developments, including the Vilkha multiple rocket launcher, Neptune cruise missile, Hrim-2 ballistic missile and other new and modernized defence equipment, as well as the Turkish UAV Bayraktar TB2. The Ukrainian military also held a military parade on the Dnieper River, outside the one on Khreshchatyk.

=== 2022 ===
With Russia’s full-scale invasion underway, Ukraine abandoned its traditional Independence Day military parade due to security concerns. Instead, Kyiv turned Khreshchatyk Street into a display of destroyed and captured Russian military equipment. The exhibition sent a clear message: Russia’s invasion had come at a heavy cost, and Ukraine remained determined to defend its sovereignty and independence.

=== 2026 ===
On the 35th Anniversary of the Restoration of Ukraine's Independence, the first ever drone parade in Ukraine's history was held featuring nearly 100 Ukrainian unmanned aerial vehicles, unmanned ground vehicles, and unmanned surface vehicles of various types. The aerial procession consisted of 18 interceptor drones of the P1-Sun, Litavar, and Sting types, 27 bomber drones of the Vampire, Lasar, and Heavy Shot types, 8 reconnaissance drones of the SHARK and LF-400 types, and 7 long range strike drones of the Morok and Sichen types. 30 UGVs of the TerMIT, Rys, Simba, Ardal, Zmiy, and Ratel types were piloted down Khreshchatyk street in a procession. The naval procession consisted of 9 USVs of the Sea Baby, MAGURA, and Sargan types that were piloted up the Dnipro River.

== Cancelled parade periods ==
=== 2005–2007 ===
By decree of President Viktor Yuschenko in 2005, the parade was cancelled, only to return in 2008 for the 17th anniversary of Ukraine.

=== 2010–2014 ===
Under the presidency of Viktor Yanukovich, the parade was not held at all.

=== 2019–2020 ===
On 10 July 2019 Ukrainian president Volodymyr Zelenskyy announced on Facebook that the 2019 Ukrainian Independence Day celebrations will not include a military parade. Zelenskyy also stated "We have decided to allocate ₴300 million (nearly $12 million) as bonus payments to our servicemen, i.e. fixed-term soldiers, cadets, sergeants, officers.” On Independence Day 2020, Ukrainian President Volodymyr Zelenskyy declared that there should not be military equipment on parade in Kyiv, but on the front line of the War in Donbas "Where it is needed now." Zelenskyy also stated that there will be a military parade in the future "a parade of Ukrainian victory, when we will return all our people and all our territories." Ukraine lost control of Crimea (due to the 2014 Russian annexation of Crimea) and of territories currently held by the Donetsk People's Republic and Luhansk People's Republic at the start in 2014 of the war in Donbas.

=== Since 2022 (Note: Since 2022, as of June 2025, no formal cancellation have been announced, though parade did not take place) ===
The parade was cancelled a third time under Zelenskyy due to the ongoing invasion of Ukraine by Russian military, which Independence Day marked six months from the beginning of. Ukraine's Culture Ministry confirmed there would not be any public celebration to mark the holiday, and officials warned civilians against gathering in major cities due to the high likelihood Russia would target celebrations for shelling, with President Zelenskyy stating "Russia may try to do something particularly nasty, something particularly cruel." In substitute to a parade, the remains of numerous Russian military vehicles and artilleries destroyed by Ukrainian troops were displayed along Khreshchatyk.

== Expanded summary ==
As Independence Day is the national independence holiday of Ukraine the celebrations in Kyiv thus serve as a national event to mark the holiday. The celebrations begin as the parade commander (PC, the commander is usually the Commander of the Ukrainian Ground Forces holding the rank of Colonel General) arrives to take his place in the parade and receives the salutes of the Commandant, National Defense University and reviews the formations in attendance.

At 10am the President arrives and personnel of the tri-service Kyiv Presidential Honor Guard Battalion marches in the formation on Independence Square, carrying the Flag of Ukraine to be raised and halts just west of the flagpole to render honors, with the massed bands of the Military Music Directorate of the Armed Forces playing music. The flag is raised to the National Anthem Shche ne vmerla Ukrainy (either with the massed bands plus optional chorus or a capella) and a 21-gun salute is then fired.

The parade then prepares for its inspection by the Minister of Defense. As the vehicle carrying the Minister approaches the Massed Bands, as the Drum Majors and the Senior Director of Music signal the bands to stop playing the parade commander informs him of the readiness of the parade to be reviewed. The bands then resuming the inspection music, the vehicles of the parade commander and the Minister then inspect the formations of the ground column, which present arms with eyes right. As the vehicles stop upon reaching each battalion and the massed bands pause at the orders of the senior director of music, the Minister then addresses the formations assembled:

Minister: Glory to Ukraine!
Troops: Glory to the heroes, sir!
Minister: To the service personnel of the (states unit/formation), I greet you on the occasion of the anniversary of the independence of Ukraine!

A threefold Glory! (Ukrainian: Slava!) is the response of the battalions following the greeting as the music resumes. Following the ground column, the parade commander and Minister then inspect the battalions of the vehicle and gun crews forming up the mobile column, and then return to the saluting base at Independence Square.

After the review finishes, the President, upon receiving the concluding report from the Defense Minister (who is a civilian or holding general of the army rank if military), and the parade being ordered to stand at ease, then addresses the nation. The Prayer for Ukraine is then played afterwards, after which (in recent years) an awards ceremony is held, wherein distinguished servicemen are honored and new colours received by military, police, civil defence and border guard units. As the linemen and markers take their places afterwards, at the same time the colour guard formed from the new colours received on this day takes its position in the line behind the tri-service colour guard in readiness for the march past. After the colour guard is formed, the parade commander then orders the parade to commence the march past in review in the following manner:

Parade... attention! Ceremonial march past!
Form battalions! Distance by a single lineman! Slope... arms!
Eyes to the right, by the left, forward, quick march!

As the parade forms up, as the PC shouts the Ceremonial march past order, the parade's armed units execute high port arms and all the unit color guards execute slope arms and then all the contingents advance in review order at this point and halt without a word of command in the middle of the street turning about. After the final command, the Corps of Drums of the Ivan Bohun Military High School beats a cadence to begin the march past segment, preceded by the parade commander's vehicle and followed by the tri-service colour guard, historical colours and the massed colour guard unit. As the massed bands start playing the Corps of Drums stop playing by the signal of the Corps Drum Major and swings its drumsticks while on the eyes right.

=== Order of the parade in order of inspection by the Minister of Defense ===
==== Military bands in attendance ====
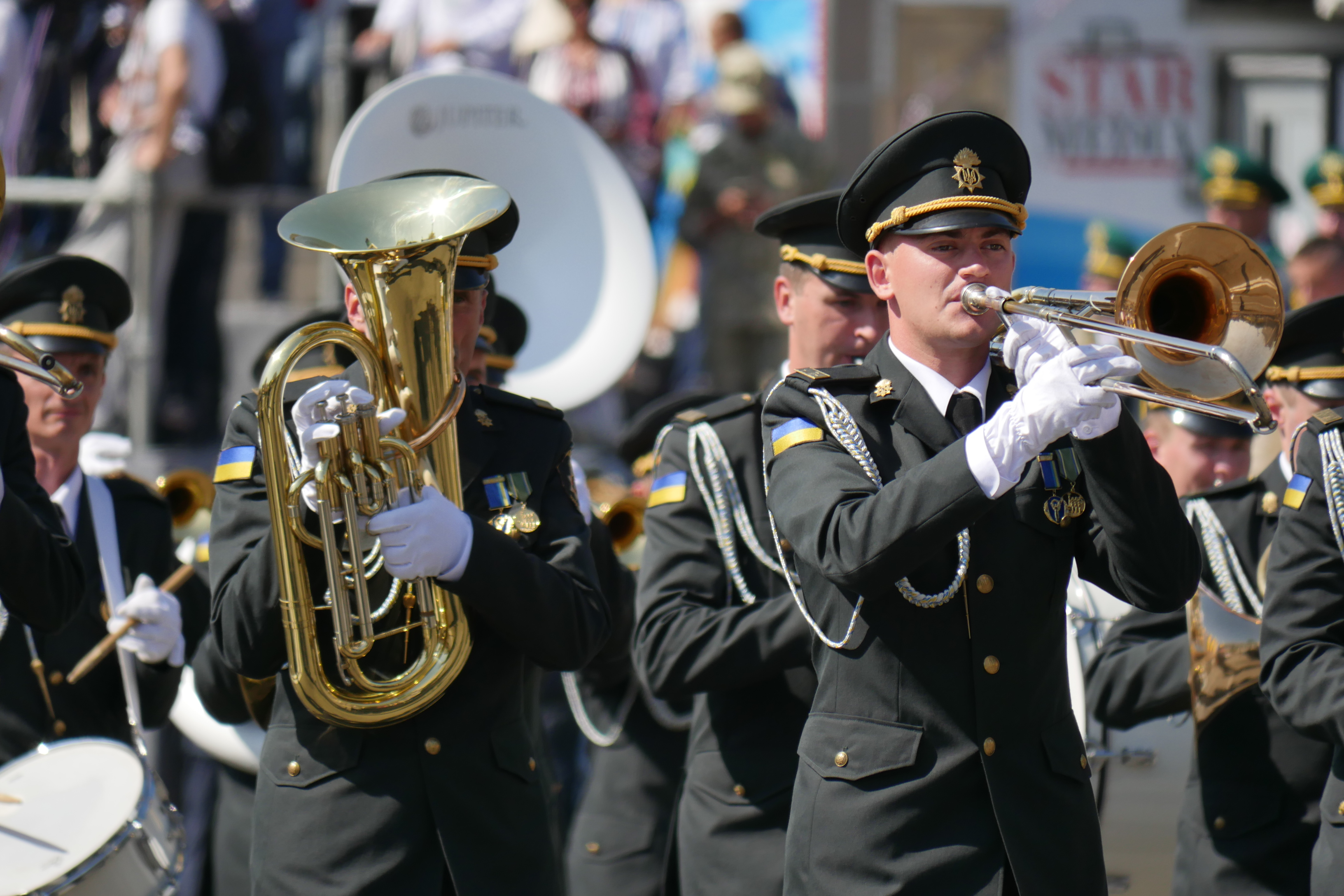
The Central Band of the Military Band Service of the National Guard of Ukraine

- Massed Bands of the Military Music Department of the General Staff of the Ukrainian Armed Forces
  - Band of the Kyiv Presidential Honor Guard Battalion (2015)
  - National Presidential Band of Ukraine (2016, 2018)
  - Military Band of the National Guard of Ukraine (2017, 2018, 2021)
- Composite NATO massed bands (2021)
  - United States Air Forces in Europe Band
  - British Army Band Colchester

==== Ground march past column ====
- Corps of Drums, Ivan Bohun Military High School
- Tri-Service Colour Guard of the Kyiv Presidential Honor Guard Battalion
- Historical colour guard
- Colours from military, police, civil defence and border guard units
- Historical component
  - Zaporozhian Sich/Cossack Hetmanate
  - Registered Cossacks of Polish–Lithuanian Commonwealth
  - Ukrainian War of Independence
    - Ground Forces
    - Navy
- Corps of Cadets, Ivan Bohun Military High School
- Corps of Cadets, Naval High School
- National Defense University
- Corps of Cadets, Hetman Petro Sahaidachnyi National Ground Forces Academy
- Military Institute of Telecommunications and Information Technologies
- Corps of Cadets Ivan Kozhedub National Air Force University
- Corps of Cadets Koroliov Military Institute (National Aviation University)
- Regiment of Cadets, Naval College Odesa (Nakhimov Naval Academy) (National University "Odesa Maritime Academy")
- Odesa Military Academy
- 24th Mechanized Brigade
- 72nd Mechanized Brigade
- 1st Tank Brigade
- Composite battalion of the Rocket Forces and Artillery
- Composite battalion of the Air Defense Missile Artillery
- Composite battalion of the Corps of Engineers of the Ground Forces
- Composite battalion of Ukrainian Army Aviation
- Composite regiment of the Air Assault Forces
  - 25th Airborne Brigade
  - Air Assault Infantry
  - Airmobile Infantry
- Composite battalion of the Air Defense Forces of the Air Force
- Composite regiment of the Ukrainian Marine Corps
  - Marine Infantry
  - Marine Artillery
- Composite Navy Fleet battalion
- Composite battalion of Ukrainian Naval Aviation
- Composite regiment of the Special Operations Forces of Ukraine
  - Battalion of SOF Regiments
  - Naval SOF Center
  - Ranger Regiment battalion
- Composite battalion of the Armed Forces Reserve
- Composite battalion of female personnel of the Armed Forces
- Territorial Defense Forces composite battalion
- Territorial Defense Forces composite female battalion
- Corps of Cadets, Yaroslav Kondratiev Law High School
- National Academy of Internal Affairs
- Composite battalion of female personnel of the National Police
- Kyiv Patrol Police
- Special Police Forces battalion from Liut Police Brigade
- National Guard Military Academy
- Battalion from the 25th Public Security Brigade, National Guard of Ukraine
- Composite battalion of NGU Offensive Guard Corps
- National Security Service Academy
- Khmelnytskyi National State Border Guard Service Academy
- Composite battalion of the State Border Guard Service of Ukraine
- Battalion of Steel Border Infantry Brigade, SBGSU
- Kharkiv National Civil Defense University, State Emergency Service of Ukraine
- 1st Guards Battalion (Mechanized), Independent Presidential Brigade
- Composite battalion of K-9 dogs and handlers of the Armed Forces, National Guard, National Police, State Emergency Service and State Border Guard Service
- Foreign contingents
- Veterans contingent

==== Guest contingents ====
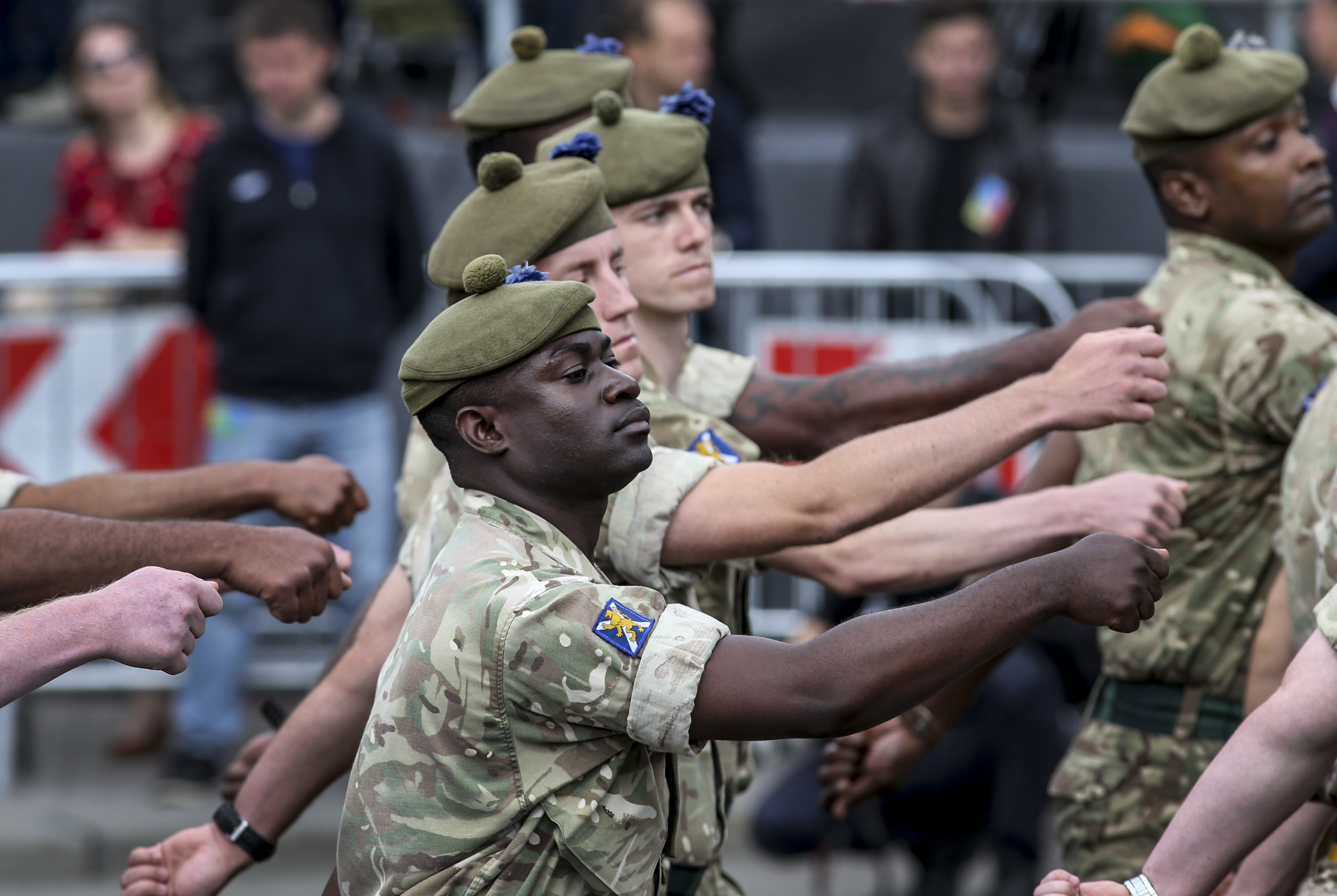
The Royal Regiment of Scotland.

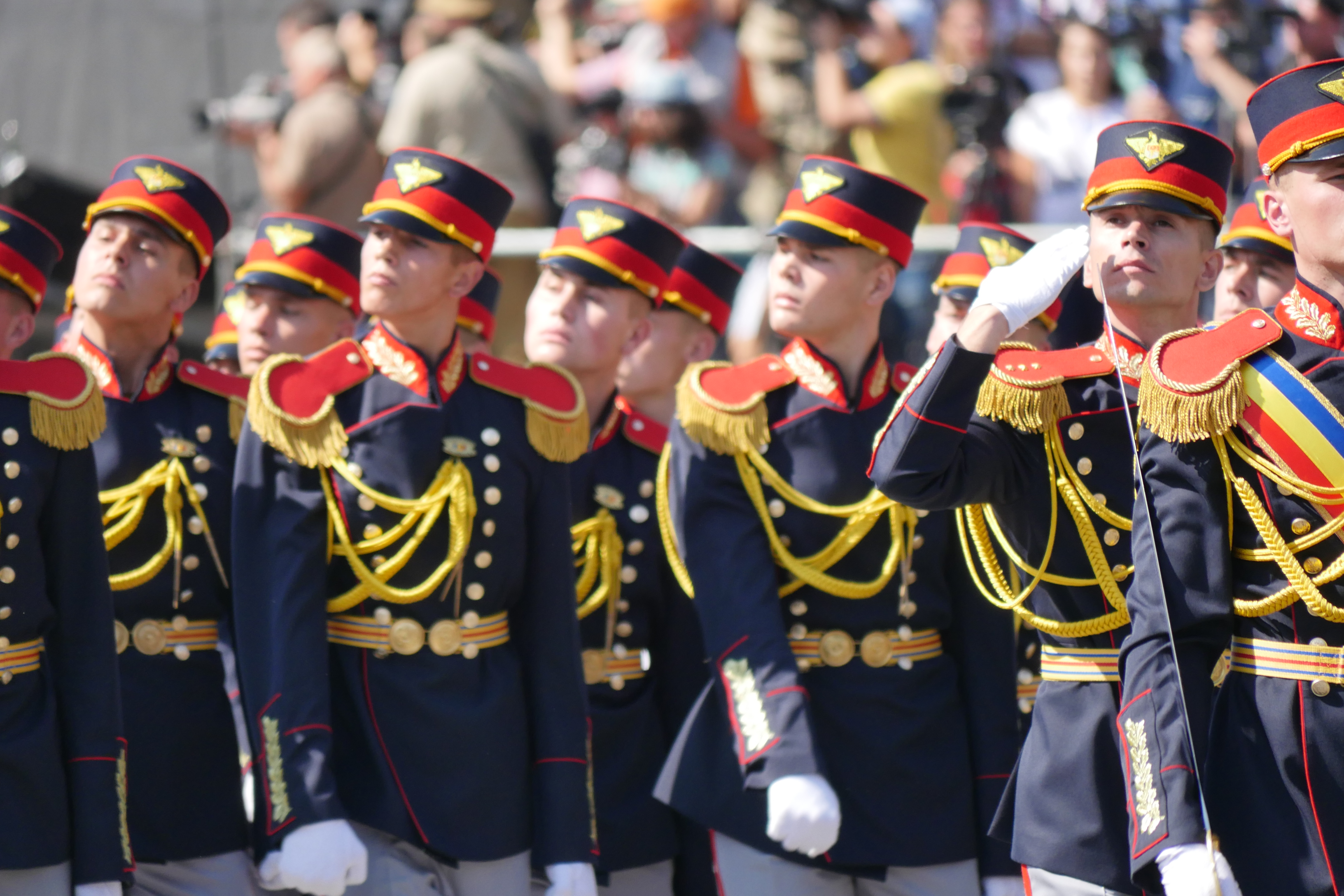
The Honor Guard Company of Moldova.

Year	Country	Unit
2016; 2017; 2018; 2021	Lithuania; Poland; Ukraine	Lithuanian–Polish–Ukrainian Brigade
2017; 2018; 2021	Canada	Troops from Operation Unifier
2018; 2021	Czech Republic	Honor Guard of the Czech Armed Forces
2021	Denmark	Royal Life Guards
2018	Estonia	Training regiment of the Estonian Defence Forces
2021	Estonia	Guard Battalion/Estonian Defence League
2021	Finland	Guard Jaeger Regiment
2017; 2018	(Georgia (country)) Georgia	Honour Guard of the National Guard of Georgia
2021	(Georgia (country)) Georgia	2nd Infantry Brigade, Georgian Land Forces
2017; 2018; 2021	Latvia	Latvian National Armed Forces Staff Battalion
2021	Lithuania	Grand Duke Gediminas Staff Battalion
2017	Moldova	22nd Peacekeeping Battalion (led by Major Ianac Deli)
2018; 2021	Moldova	Honor Guard Company
2021	Poland	Polish Air Force
2017; 2018	Romania	Romanian Armed Forces
2021	Romania	Michael the Brave 30th Guards Brigade
2021	Slovakia	Honorary Guard of the Slovak Armed Forces; Slovak Air Force; Special Operations Forces
2021	Sweden	Life Guards
2017	United Kingdom	Royal Regiment of Scotland
2018	United Kingdom	Parachute Regiment
2021	United Kingdom	Royal Lancers; No. 9 Squadron RAF
2017	United States	Oklahoma National Guard's 45th Infantry Brigade Combat Team
2018	United States	Tennessee Army National Guard's 278th Armored Cavalry Regiment
2021	United States	81st Stryker Brigade Combat Team, Washington Army National Guard; 100th Air Refueling Wing

== Gallery ==
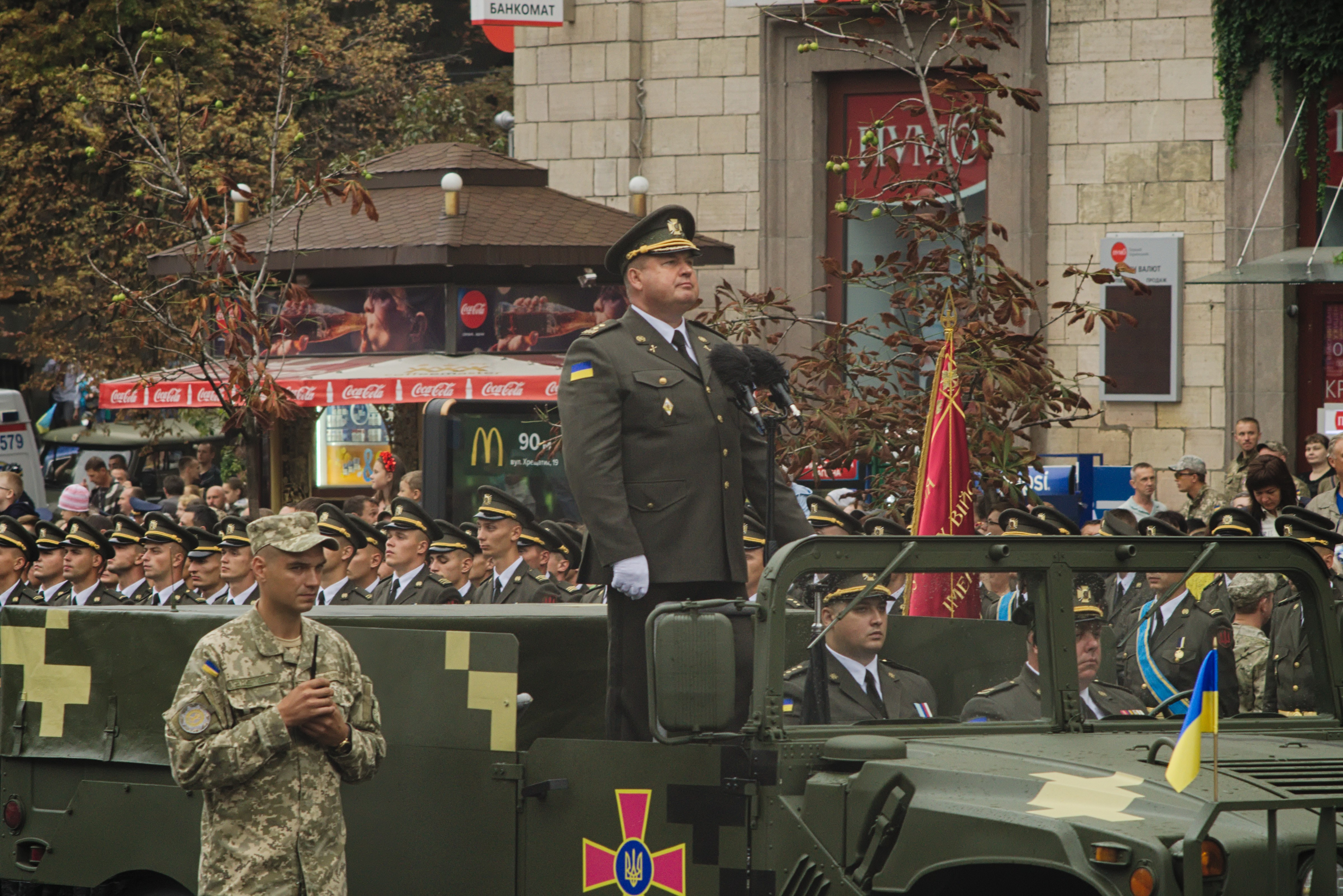

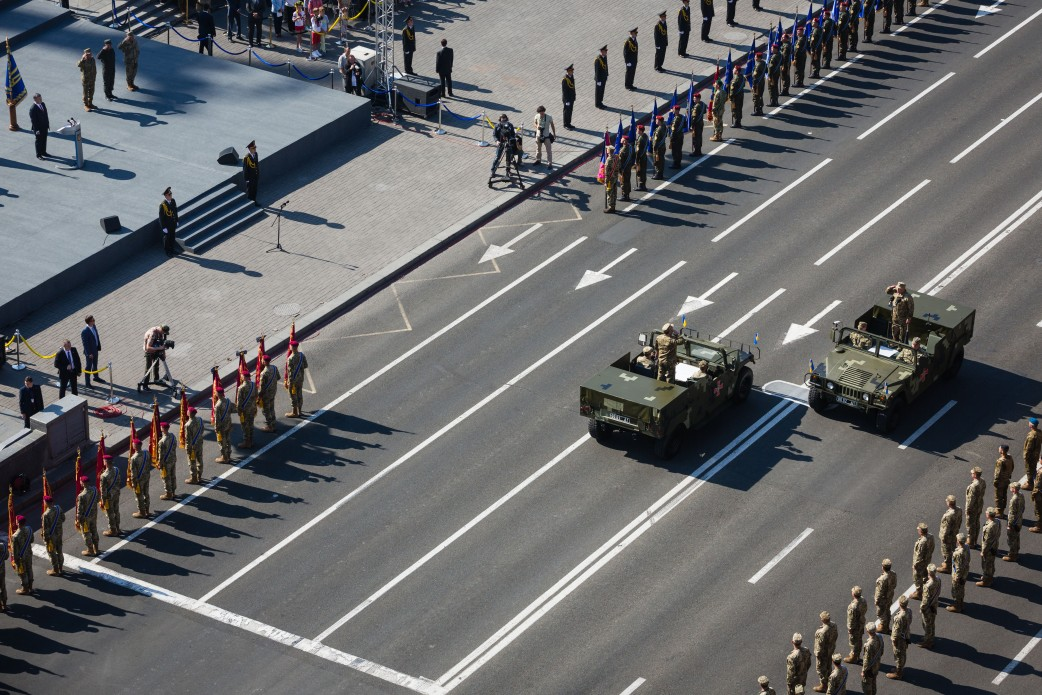

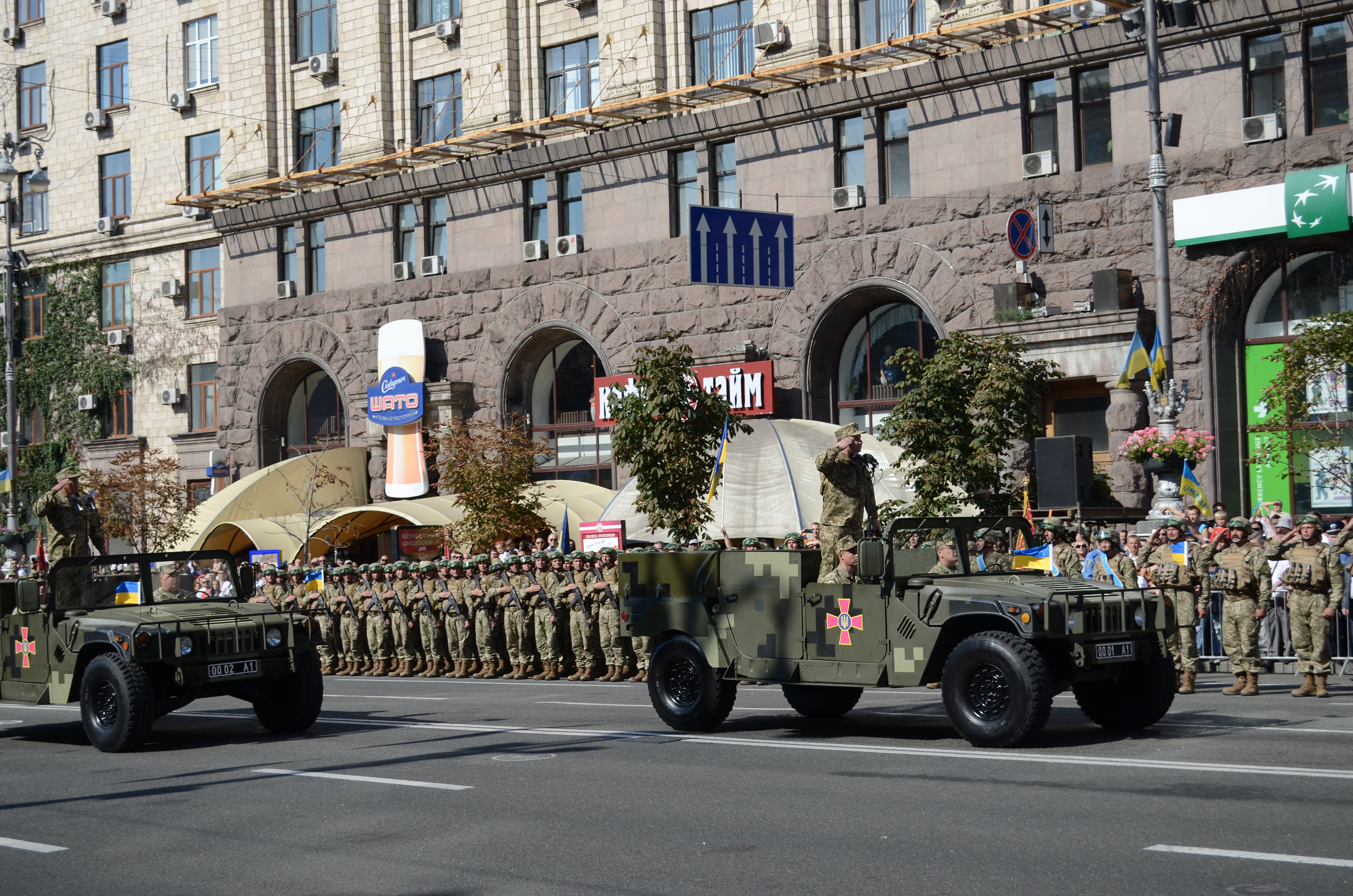

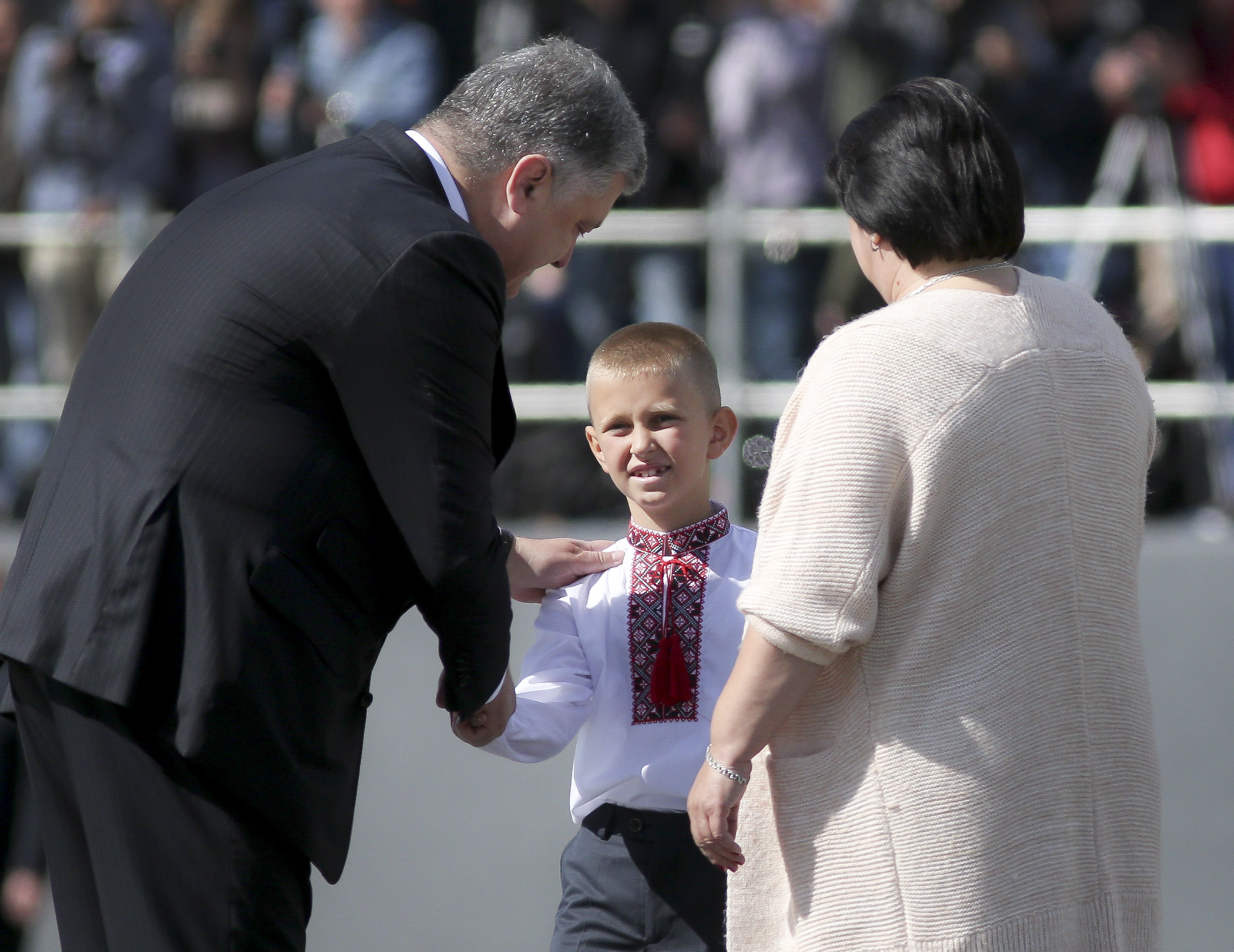

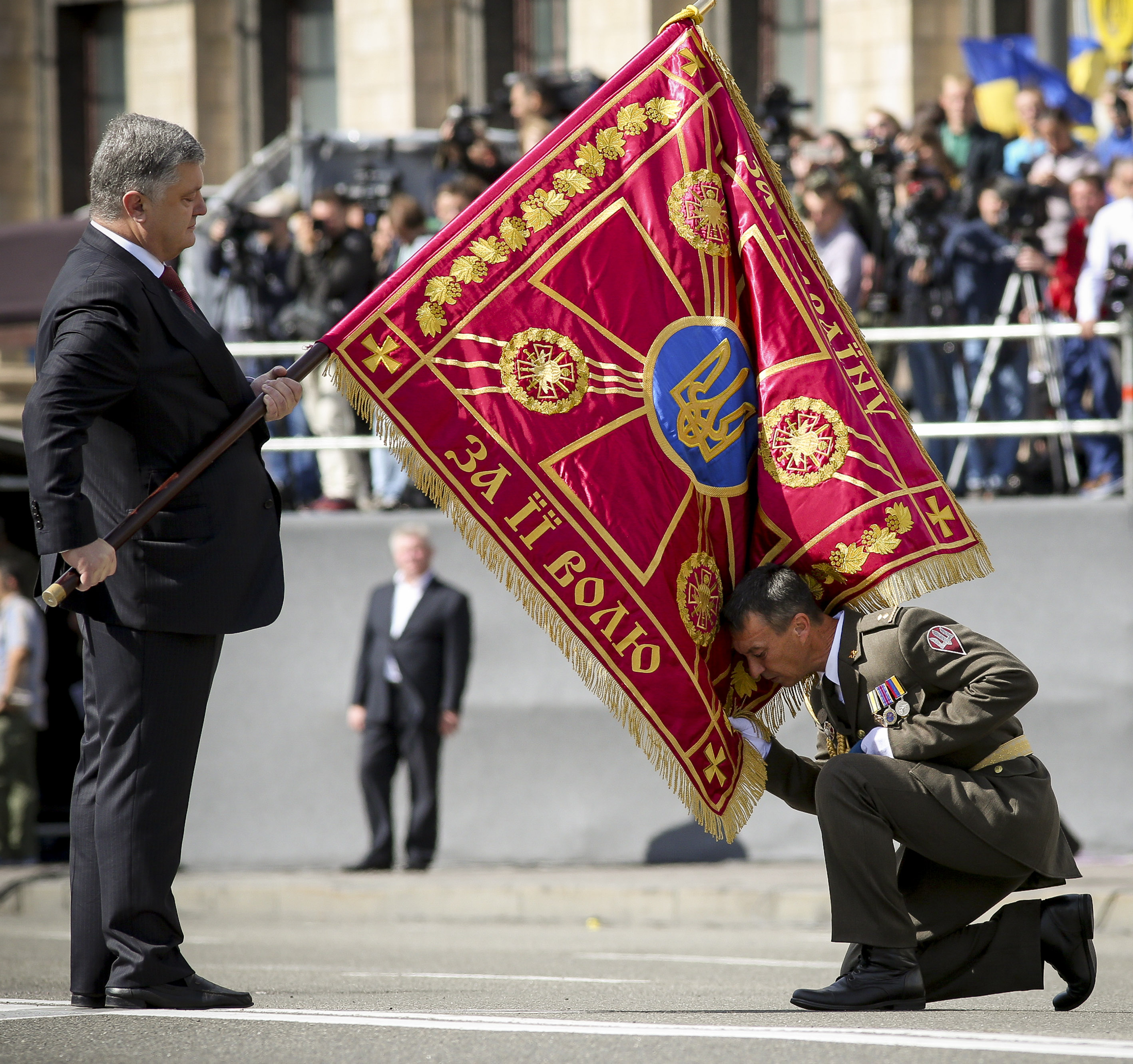

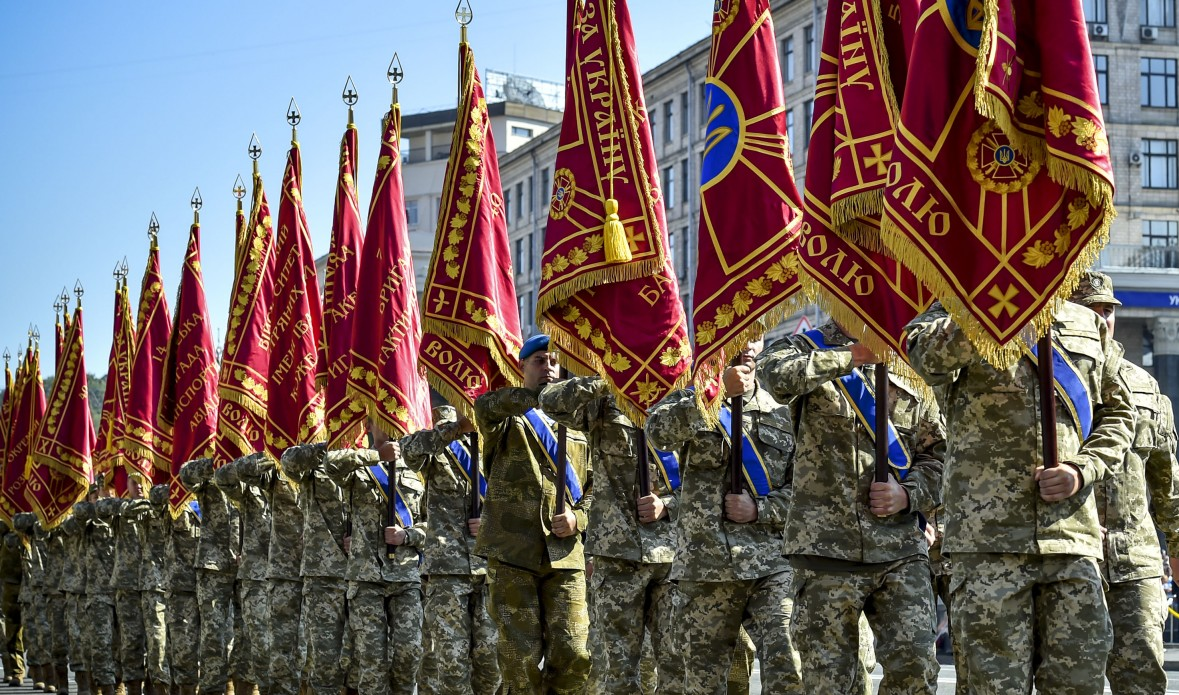

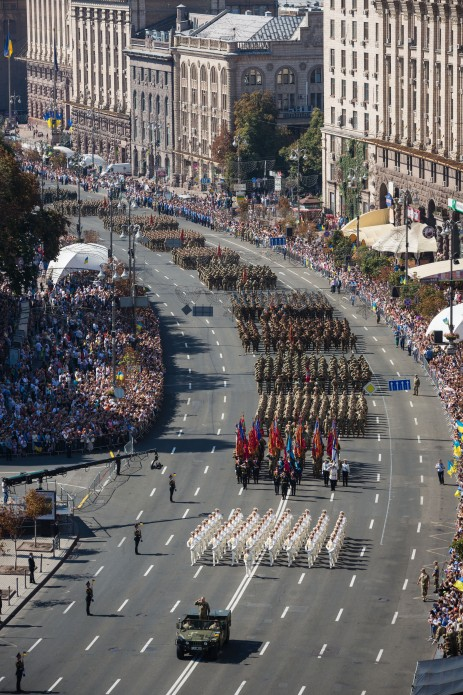

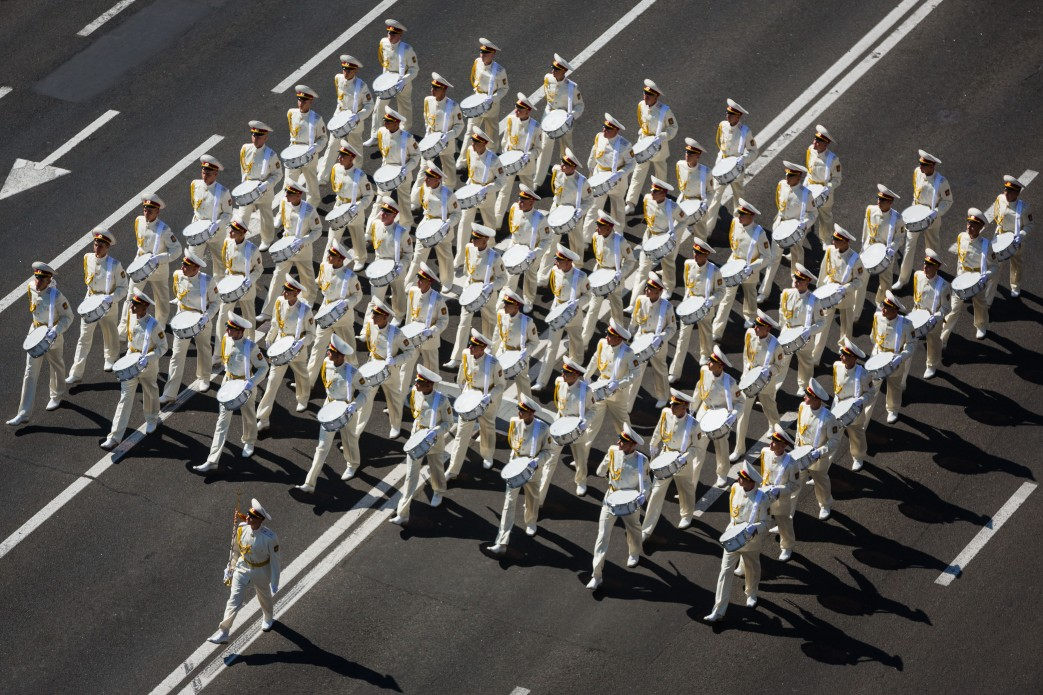

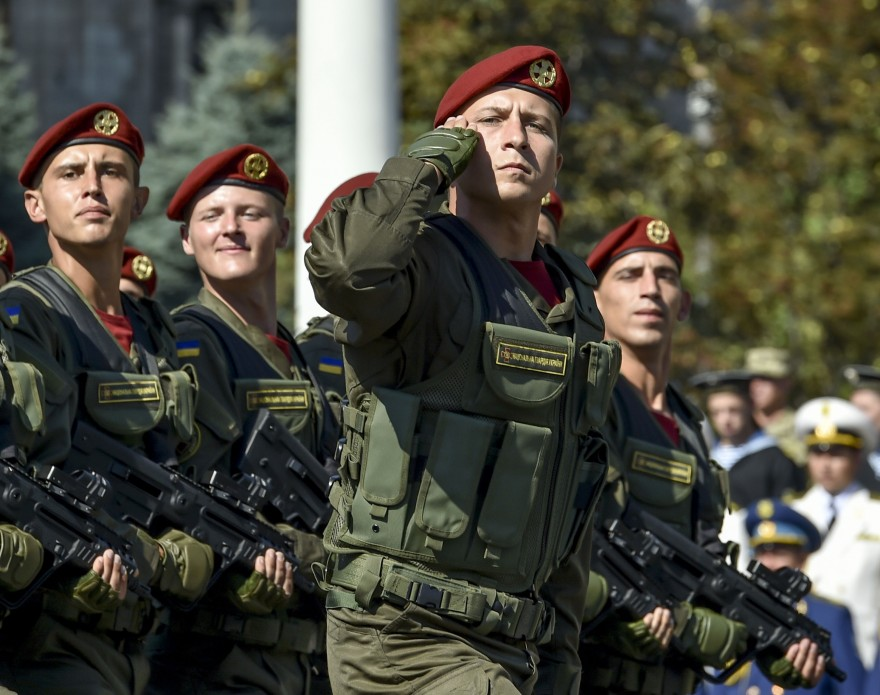

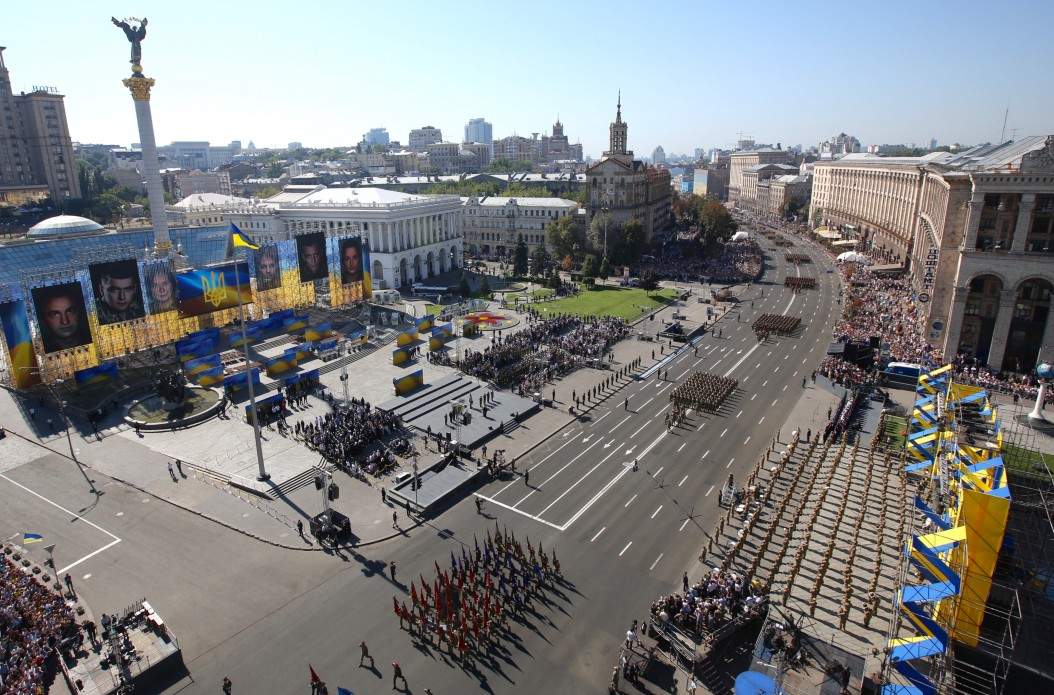

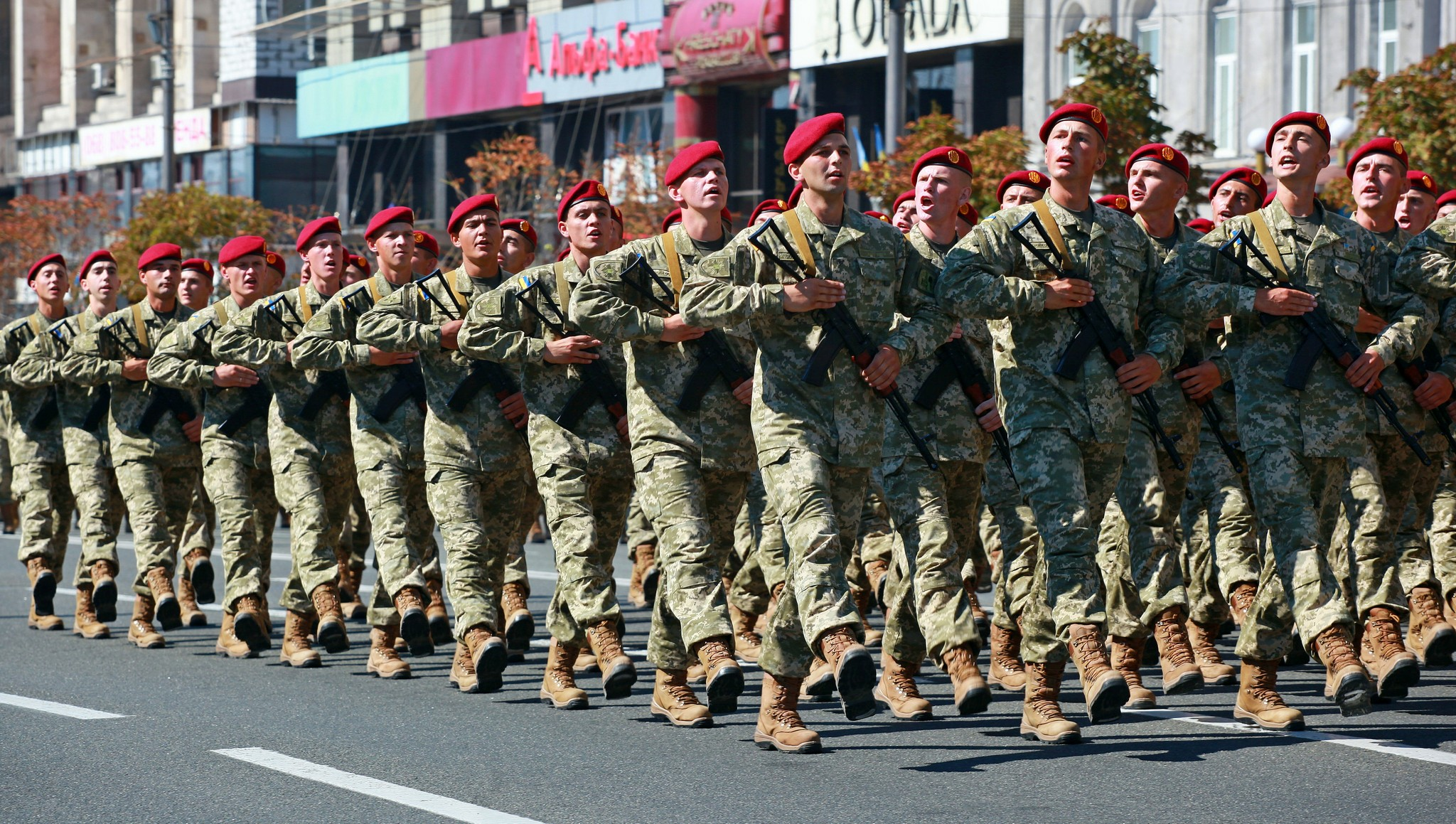

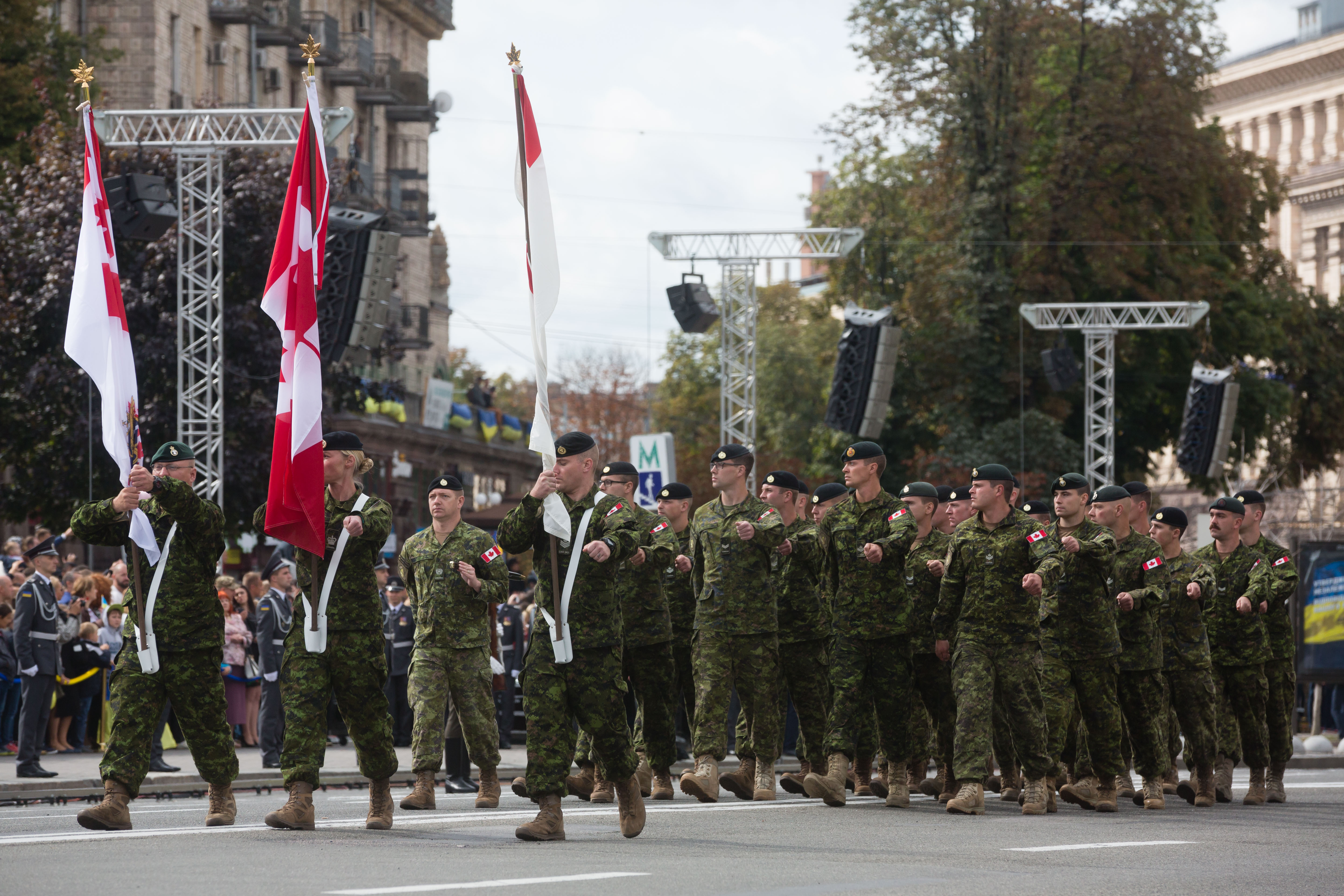

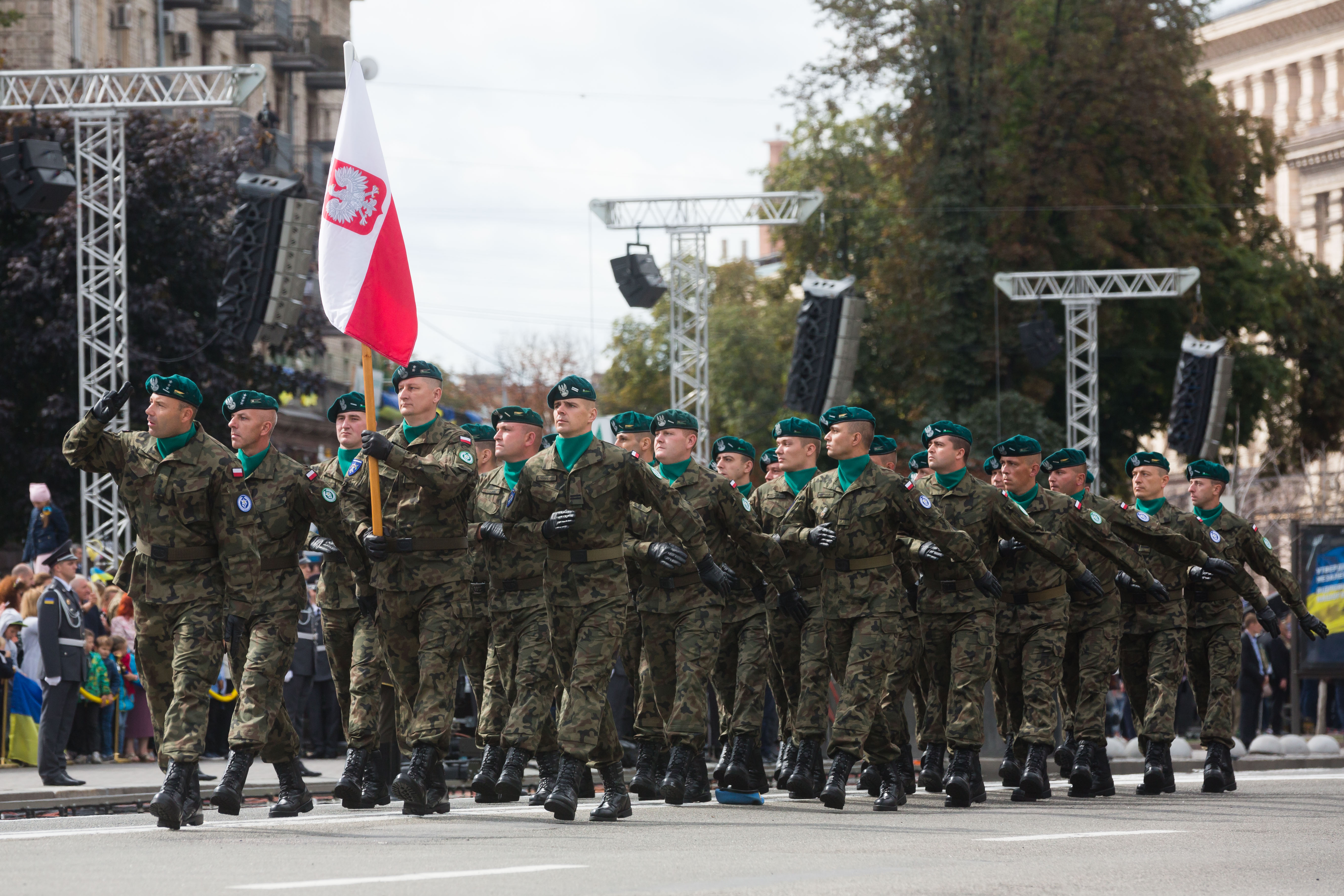

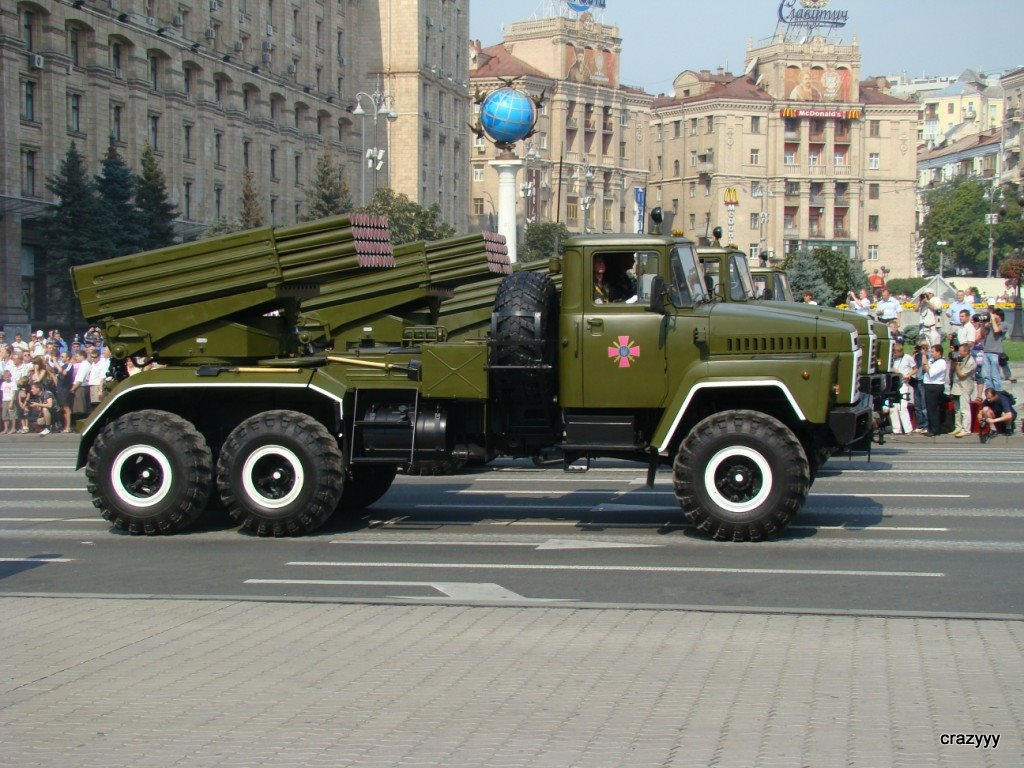

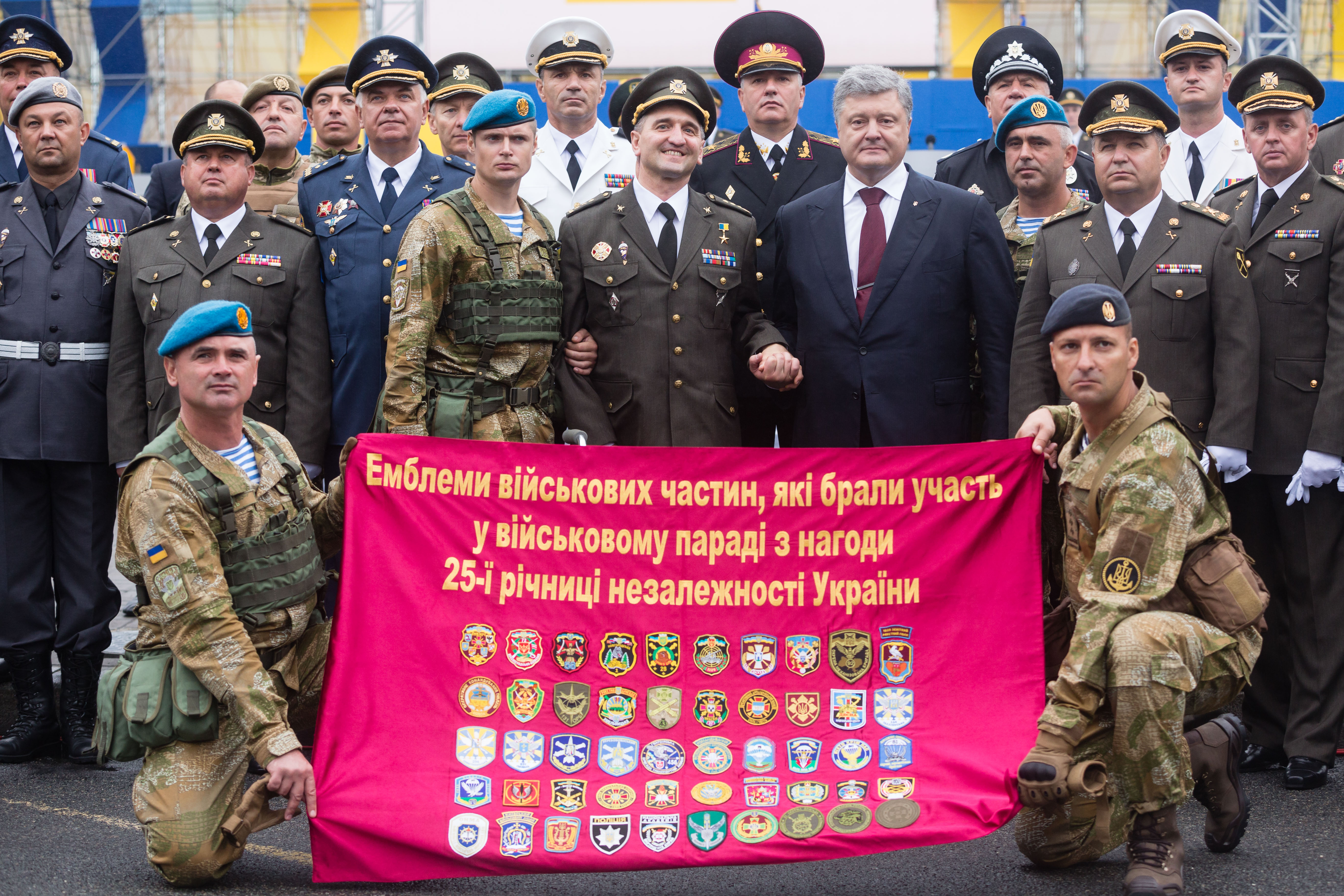
President Poroshenko and the commanders of all parade contingents in front of a banner depicting the logos of all military units in the parade.

== Videos ==
- Parade in honor of the Independence Day of Ukraine. 24 August 1999
- Parade in honor of the Independence Day of Ukraine. 24 August 2001
- Parade in honor of the Independence Day of Ukraine. 24 August 2003
- Parade in honor of the Independence Day of Ukraine. 24 August 2004
- Parade in honor of the Independence Day of Ukraine. 24 August 2008
- Parade in honor of the Independence Day of Ukraine. 24 August 2009
- Parade in honor of the Independence Day of Ukraine. 24 August 2014
- Parade in honor of the Independence Day of Ukraine. 24 August 2015
- Independence March 24 August 2016
- Parade in honor of the Independence Day of Ukraine. 24 August 2017
- Parade in honor of the Independence Day of Ukraine. 24 August 2018

== See also ==
- Independence Day of Ukraine
- Military parade
