= List of ministers of defence (Ukraine) =

Minister of Defence
- Міністр оборони України (Ukrainian)

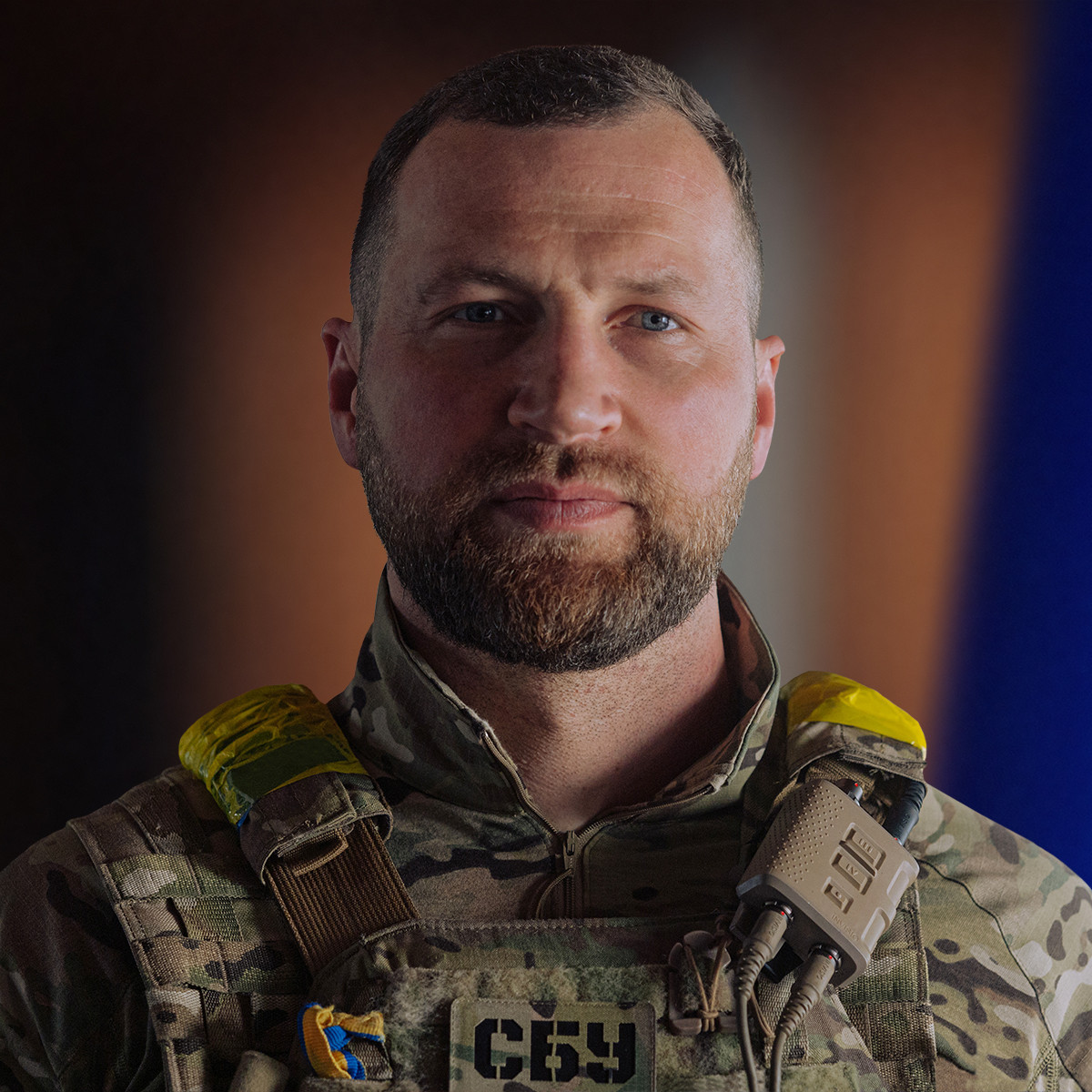
- Incumbent; Yevhenii Khmara since 19 August 2026
- Ministry of Defence
- Type: Minister
- Member of: Cabinet; National Security and Defense Council
- Reports to: President; Prime Minister
- Nominator: President
- Appointer: President; confirmed by the Verkhovna Rada
- Precursor: People's Commissar of Defense (1944–1945); People's Minister of Military Affairs (1918–1927)
- Formation: 3 September 1991; 35 years ago
- First holder: Kostiantyn Morozov
- Deputy: First Deputy Minister

The minister of defence of Ukraine (Ukrainian: Міністр оборони України, romanized: Ministr oborony Ukrainy) is the head of the Ministry of Defence, which is in charge of the Armed Forces of Ukraine, the second-largest military power in Europe after its Russian counterpart. The Minister of Defence is appointed by the president, but this has to be confirmed by a majority vote in the Verkhovna Rada, the parliament of Ukraine. From 1 January 2019, Ukraine has had civilian control of the military by requiring that the Minister of Defence be a civilian, although they may have recently resigned from the military.

Since Ukrainian independence from the Soviet Union in 1991, there have been 20 defence ministers (not including acting ones).

== List of ministers of defence ==
=== Ministers ===
No.	Portrait	Name (Birth–Death)	Term of office			Political party	Cabinet(s)	President(s)	Ref.
No.	Portrait	Name (Birth–Death)	Took office	Left office	Time in office	Political party	Cabinet(s)	President(s)	Ref.
1		Colonel general (Ret.); Kostyantyn Morozov (born 1944)	3 September 1991	30 September 1993	2 years, 27 days	Independent	Fokin; Symonenko; Kuchma; Zvyahilsky	Leonid Kravchuk	
–		Colonel general Ivan Bizhan (born 1941) acting	4 October 1993	8 October 1993	4 days	Independent	Zvyahilsky	Leonid Kravchuk	
2		General of the Army; Vitaliy Radetskyi (born 1944)	8 October 1993	25 August 1994	321 days	Independent	Zvyahilsky; Masol II	Leonid Kravchuk; Leonid Kuchma	
–		Valeriy Shmarov (1945–2018)	25 August 1994	10 October 1994	46 days	Independent	Zvyahilsky; Marchuk	Leonid Kuchma	
3		Valeriy Shmarov (1945–2018)	10 October 1994	8 July 1996	1 year, 272 days	Independent	Marchuk; Lazarenko I	Leonid Kuchma	
4		General of the Army; Oleksandr Kuzmuk (born 1954)	11 July 1996	24 October 2001	5 years, 105 days	Party of Regions	Lazarenko II; Durdynets; Pustovoitenko; Yushchenko; Kinakh	Leonid Kuchma	
5		General of the Army; Volodymyr Shkidchenko (born 1948)	12 November 2001	25 June 2003	1 year, 224 days	Independent	Kinakh; Yanukovych I	Leonid Kuchma	
6		General of the Army (Ret.); Yevhen Marchuk (1941–2021)	25 June 2003	23 September 2004	1 year, 90 days	Social Democratic Union	Yanukovych I	Leonid Kuchma	
(4)		General of the Army; Oleksandr Kuzmuk (born 1954)	24 September 2004	3 February 2005	133 days	Party of Regions	Yanukovych I	Leonid Kuchma; Viktor Yushchenko	
7		Anatoliy Hrytsenko (born 1957)	4 February 2005	18 December 2007	2 years, 317 days	Our Ukraine	Tymoshenko I Yekhanurov; Yanukovych II	Viktor Yushchenko	
8		Yuriy Yekhanurov (born 1948)	18 December 2007	5 June 2009	1 year, 169 days	Revival	Tymoshenko II	Viktor Yushchenko	
–		Valeriy Ivashchenko (born 1956) acting	5 June 2009	11 March 2010	279 days	Independent	Tymoshenko II	Viktor Yushchenko; Viktor Yanukovych	
9		Admiral (Ret.); Mykhailo Yezhel (born 1952)	11 March 2010	8 February 2012	1 year, 334 days	Independent	Tymoshenko II	Viktor Yanukovych	
10		Dmytro Salamatin (born 1965)	8 February 2012	24 December 2012	320 days	Party of Regions	Azarov I	Viktor Yanukovych	
11		Pavlo Lebedyev (born 1962)	24 December 2012	27 February 2014	1 year, 65 days	Party of Regions	Azarov II	Viktor Yanukovych; Oleksandr Turchynov	
–		Colonel general Volodymyr Zamana (born 1959) as Commissar	22 February 2014	27 February 2014	5 days	Independent		Oleksandr Turchynov	
–		Admiral; Ihor Tenyukh (born 1958) acting	27 February 2014	25 March 2014	26 days	Svoboda	Yatsenyuk I	Oleksandr Turchynov	
–		Colonel general Mykhailo Koval (born 1956) acting	25 March 2014	3 July 2014	100 days	Independent	Yatsenyuk I	Oleksandr Turchynov; Petro Poroshenko	
12		Colonel general Valeriy Heletey (born 1967)	3 July 2014	14 October 2014	103 days	Independent	Yatsenyuk I	Petro Poroshenko	
13		General of the Army; Stepan Poltorak (born 1965)	14 October 2014	29 August 2019	4 years, 319 days	Independent	Yatsenyuk I Yatsenyuk II; Groysman	Petro Poroshenko; Volodymyr Zelenskyy	
14		Andrii Zahorodniuk (born 1976)	29 August 2019	4 March 2020	188 days	Independent	Honcharuk	Volodymyr Zelenskyy	
15		Lieutenant general (Ret.); Andriy Taran (born 1955)	4 March 2020	3 November 2021	1 year, 244 days	Independent	Shmyhal	Volodymyr Zelenskyy	
16		Oleksii Reznikov (born 1966)	4 November 2021	5 September 2023	1 year, 305 days	Independent	Shmyhal	Volodymyr Zelenskyy	
17		Rustem Umerov (born 1982)	6 September 2023	17 July 2025	1 year, 314 days	Holos	Shmyhal	Volodymyr Zelenskyy	
18		Denys Shmyhal (born 1975)	17 July 2025	13 January 2026	180 days	Independent	Svyrydenko	Volodymyr Zelenskyy	
19		Mykhailo Fedorov (born 1991)	14 January 2026	15 July 2026	183 days	Independent	Svyrydenko	Volodymyr Zelenskyy	
–		Major General; Yevhenii Khmara (born ?)	16 July 2026	19 August 2026	34 days	Independent	Koretskyi	Volodymyr Zelenskyy	
20		Major General; Yevhenii Khmara (born ?)	19 August 2026	Incumbent	28 days	Independent	Koretskyi	Volodymyr Zelenskyy	

The current Minister of Defense is Yevhenii Khmara, officially since 19 August 2026 and acting since 16 July 2026. The longest-serving Minister of Defense is Oleksandr Kuzmuk who served for five years, a total of 2,063 days.

The longest serving as an acting Minister of Defense is Valeriy Ivashchenko who served for a total 279 days (over 9 months).

=== First deputy ministers ===
Created on 27 May 1992, the office of deputy ministers was expanded on 4 June 1992 with the chief of the General Staff holding the post until 8 February 2002. Since 10 September 2003, the post was "demilitarized", held only by civilian or retired military personnel. The first deputy serves as an acting minister in absence of officially appointed minister unless specified otherwise.

- 27 May 1992 – 24 March 1993 Lieutenant General Ivan Bizhan (since 24 December 1991 a deputy minister; Chief of the General Staff since 25 September 1992)
- 4 June 1992 – 25 September 1992 Lieutenant General Vasyl Sobkov (Chief of the General Staff)
- 24 March 1993 – 10 February 1996 Colonel General Anatoliy Lopata (Chief of the General Staff)
- 12 March 1996 – 30 September 1998 Lieutenant General Oleksandr Zatynaiko (Chief of the General Staff)
- 14 March 1996 – 8 February 2002 Colonel General Ivan Bizhan
- 30 September 1998 – 13 November 2001 Colonel General Volodymyr Shkidchenko (Chief of the General Staff)
- 27 November 2001 – 8 February 2002 Colonel General Petro Shkulyak (Chief of the General Staff)
  - In 2002 – 2003 all deputies were replaced (phased away) by newly created posts of state secretaries, but after the reform was reverted.
- 25 January 2002 – 10 September 2003 Oleksandr Oliynyk
- 5 February 2002 – 14 August 2003 Colonel General Viktor Bannykh (on issues of international cooperation) (died in office)
- 10 September 2003 – ? November 2004 Oleksandr Oliynyk
- 13 September 2003 – 7 October 2004 Valentyna Hoshovska (humanitarian policy and relations with parliament)
- 5 October 2004 – 10 February 2005 Dmytro Rudkovskyi (governor of the office of Ministry of Defence)
- 6 October 2004 – 25 February 2005 Oleksandr Stetsenko
- 26 October 2004 – 25 February 2005 Volodymyr Bilyi (humanitarian policy and relations with parliament)
- 19 February 2005 – 23 January 2008 Leonid Polyakov
- 5 June 2009 – 26 May 2010 Valeriy Ivashchenko
- 31 March 2010 – 2 June 2010 Hryhoriy Pedchenko
- 18 August 2010 – 18 February 2012 Volodymyr Mozharovsky
- 18 February 2012 – 5 March 2014 Oleksandr Oliynyk
- 15 September 2014 – 14 February 2023 Ivan Rusnak
- 14 February 2023 – 10 February 2024 Oleksandr Pavliuk

== Earlier military ministers and secretaries ==
Historically, the ministry was preceding by various other governmental institutions. The very first Ukrainian representative in military affairs was Symon Petlyura, appointed by Volodymyr Vynnychenko to General Secretariat of Ukraine in the summer of 1917. Later in December 1917 after establishing the Bolshevik government in Kharkiv the Military Secretary of Ukraine was opposed by the Military Secretary of Soviet Ukraine whom the first was Vasyl Shakhrai. Note that the first ministers of Ukraine were not specialists in military affairs, particularly such as Mykola Porsh.

The Ukrainian People's Army was in terrible condition and it was not until the power in the country was taken over by the former head of the Russian Imperial Retinue and hereditary Ukrainian Cossack Pavlo Skoropadsky, under leadership of which the new minister became Aleksandr Rogoza (also known as Oleksandr Rohoza). Rogoza was instrumental in restructuring the ministry and recruiting numerous former Russian Imperial generals who pledged their allegiance to the government of Ukraine. By the end of 1918 Bolsheviks recreated the Ukrainian Soviet government and to its office of military affairs was appointed Nikolai Podvoisky, former narkom of Military Affairs of Soviet Russia who played a key role in the October Revolution. Around that time there was created the government of the West Ukrainian People's Republic, the office of military affairs of which was headed by Dmytro Vitovsky who was a specialist in special operations, particularly the mountain warfare. Vitovsky played a key role in securing the city of Lviv and ensuring the proclamation of independence of the new Ukrainian state from the disintegrating Austro-Hungary.

=== National ministers ===
Military rank	Name	Term of office	
Military rank	Name	Start	End
Chief otaman	Symon Petlyura	28 June 1917	1 January 1918
	Mykola Porsh	1 January 1918	17 January 1918
	Ivan Nemolovsky	18 January 1918	28 January 1918
Colonel	Oleksandr Zhukovsky	28 January 1918	29 April 1918
Major General	Oleksander Hrekov (temporary)	29 April 1918	3 May 1918
Colonel	Oleksandr Slyvynsky (temporary)	3 May 1918	8 May 1918
Major General	Oleksandr Lignau (temporary)	8 May 1918	16 May 1918
General of the Infantry	Alexander Ragoza	16 May 1918	14 November 1918
Lieutenant General	Borys Shutsky (temporary)	14 November 1918	14 December 1918
Podporuchik	Mykola Galagan	14 December 1918	26 December 1918
Major General	Oleksander Osetsky	26 December 1918	9 January 1919
Major General	Oleksander Hrekov (temporary)	9 January 1919	14 February 1919
Podporuchik	Hryhoriy Syrotenko (acting)	14 February 1919	22 February 1919
Colonel	Oleksandr Shapoval	22 February 1919	9 April 1919
Podporuchik	Hryhoriy Syrotenko (acting)	9 April 1919	20 June 1919
Podporuchik	Hryhoriy Syrotenko	20 June 1919	4 July 1919
Major General	Oleksandr Shaible (temporary)	4 July 1919	14 July 1919
General	Vsevolod Petriv (temporary)	14 July 1919	5 November 1919
Major General	Volodymyr Salsky	5 November 1919	25 July 1920
Colonel General	Oleksiy Halkin (temporary)	25 July 1920	24 December 1920
Colonel General	Mykola Yunakiv (temporary)	24 December 1920	8 February 1921
Lieutenant General	Serhiy Dyadyusha (temporary)	8 February 1921	24 March 1921
Lieutenant General	Mykhailo Pavlenko (temporary)	24 March 1921	11 May 1921
Major General	Marko Bezruchko (temporary)	23 May 1921	5 August 1921
Major General	Viktor Pavlenko (temporary)	5 August 1921	15 November 1921
Lieutenant General	Petro Yeroshevych (temporary)	3 November 1921	14 November 1921
Major General	Andriy Vovk (temporary)	14 November 1921	22 May 1922
Colonel General	Mykola Yunakiv	22 May 1922	1927
Colonel General	Oleksandr Udovychenko		

==== Ministers of Western Ukraine ====
- Dmytro Vitovsky (8 November 1918 – 2 August 1919)
- Viktor Kurmanovych

=== Soviet Ukraine ===
- Vasyl Shakhrai
- Yuriy Kotsyubynsky
- Valeriy Mezhlauk (January–February 1919)
- Nikolai Podvoisky (10 February – September 1919)
- Vasyl Herasymenko (11 March 1944 – 13 November 1945)

=== Ukrainian National Government (1941) ===
- Vsevolod Petriv (30 June–July 1941)

== See also ==
- Prime minister of Ukraine
- Cabinet of Ministers of Ukraine
