= 6th Army Corps (Ukraine) =

Former military unit

- 6-й армійський корпус
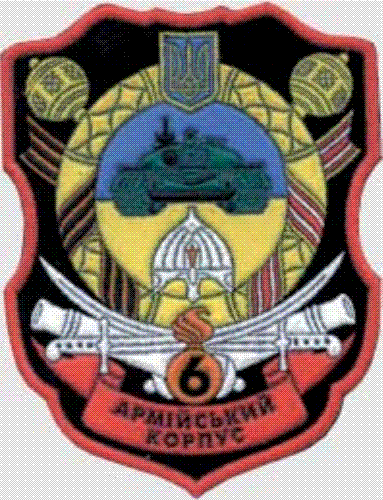
- Patch of the 6th Army Corps
- Active: July 1, 1993 – September 2, 2013
- Country: Ukraine
- Branch: Ukrainian Ground Forces
- Type: Corps
- Garrison/HQ: Dnipropetrovsk, Dnipropetrovsk Oblast

The 6th Army Corps (Ukrainian: 6-й армійський корпус, romanized: 6-y armiys'kyi korpus) was one of three army corps of the Ukrainian Ground Forces. The Corps was headquartered in Dnipropetrovsk, Ukraine. Its units were spread across Poltava Oblast, Sumy Oblast, Kharkiv Oblast, and Kirovohrad Oblast. The Corps was formed in 1993 after the collapse of the Soviet Union from a redesignation of the former Soviet 6th Guards Tank Army. It was disbanded in 2013 when the Ukrainian Ground Forces were reorganized, being replaced by Operational Command South.

== History ==
Personnel of the Ukrainian 6th Army Corps mark the 65th anniversary of the creation of its predecessor, the 6th Guards Tank Army.

The 6th Guards Tank Army had incorporated three tank divisions, the 17th Guards, 42nd, and 75th Guards. However the later two were disbanded by 1991−92. In 1992 Zaloga listed the 17th Guards Tank Division and 93rd Motor Rifle Division as being part of the army. However, in 1991−1993 the 254th Motor Rifle Division, was withdrawn from the Southern Group of Forces and joined the 6th Army Corps, garrisoned at Artemivsk. It later became the 254th Mechanised Division.

In Decree of the President of Ukraine No 350/93, 21.08.1993, 'On conferring military ranks', Colonel Ivan Svidi, named as commander of the 17th Guards Tank Division of the 6th Army Corps (Odesa MD), was promoted to Major-General. Thus by August 1993 the Corps had been shifted to the Odesa Military District. On December 3, 1993 Colonel Vladimir Polivoda, Commander 254th Mechanized Division, 6th Army Corps, Odesa Military District was promoted to Major General It later became the 52nd Mechanised Brigade.

In 2004, the Corps disbanded 2 brigades (among them, the 52nd Mechanised Brigade in October 2004) and 3 regiments. One brigade and one regiment were added. In 2006, the Corps almost doubled in size.

The corps was disbanded in 2013 and its commander reportedly became the temporary commander of the new Operational Command South.

== Structure ==
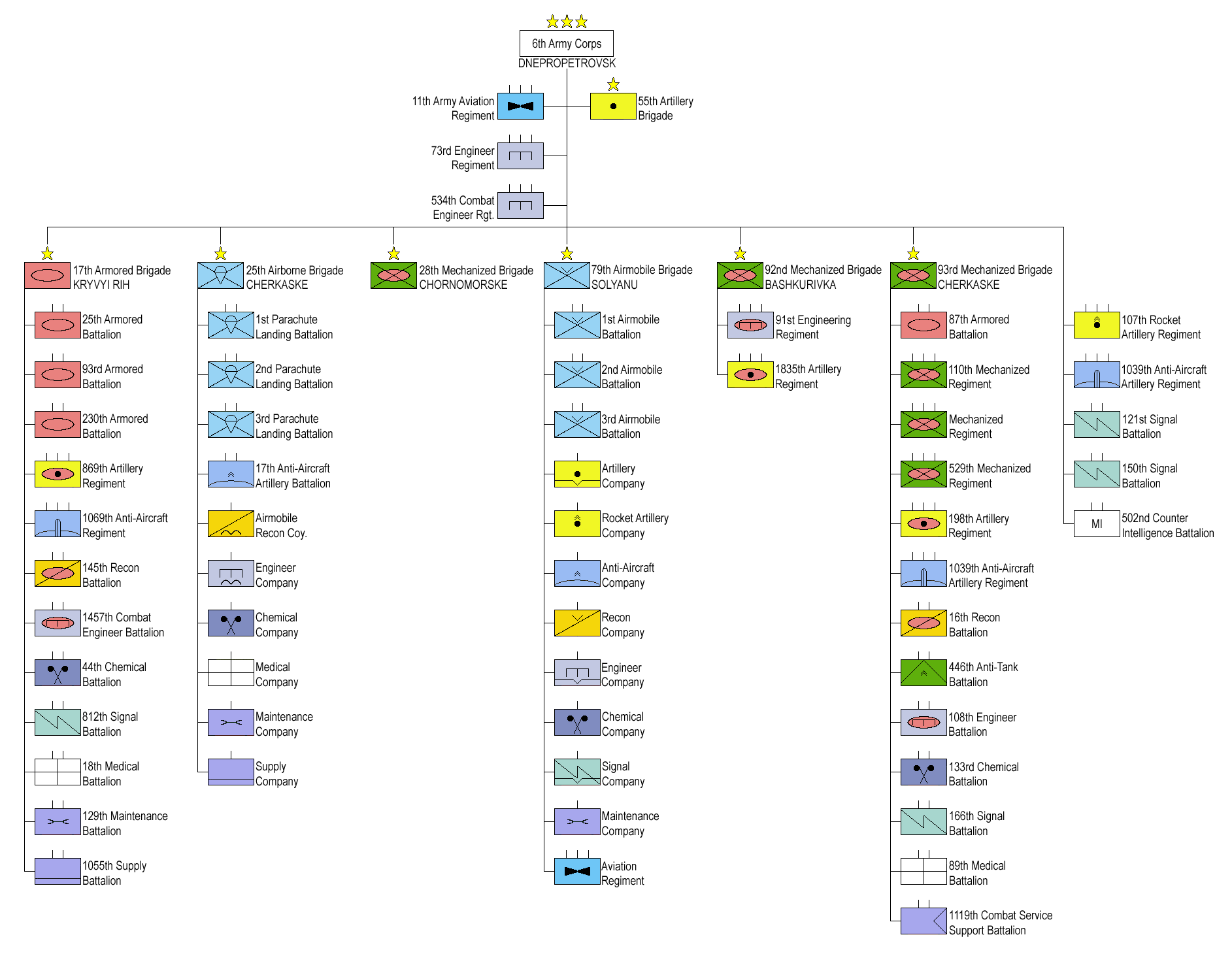
Structure 6th Army Corps

- HQ 6th Army Corps
  - 25th Airborne Brigade (Cherkaske)
  - 28th Guards Mechanised Brigade - (Chornomorske)
  - 92nd Mechanized Brigade - (Chuhuiv)
  - 93rd Mechanized Brigade - (Cherkaske)
  - 17th Guards Tank Brigade - (Kryvyi Rih)
  - 55th Artillery Brigade - (Zaporizhzhia)
  - 107th Rocket Artillery Regiment - (Kremenchuk)
  - 11th Army Aviation Regiment - (Chornobaivka)
  - 73rd Engineer Regiment - (Dniprodzerzhynsk)
  - 534th Combat Engineer Regiment
  - 1039th Anti-Aircraft Artillery
  - 121st Signal Battalion
  - 150th Signal Battalion
  - 502nd Counter Intelligence Battalion

=== Disbanded Units ===
- 52nd Mechanised Brigade

== Commanders ==
Rank	Name	Position held	
Rank	Name	Start	End
Major General	Vitaliy Radetskyi	May 1991	January 1992
Major General	Volodymyr Shkidchenko	March 1992	June 1993
Major General	Oleh Shustenko	June 1993	April 1994
Major General	Valentyn Tymko	April 1994	August 1996
Major General	Volodymyr Mozharovskyi	August 1996	May 2000
Major General	Volodymyr Bataliuk	May 2000	September 2002
Major General	Rauf Nurullin	September 2002	November 2003
Major General	Yuri Shapoval	November 2003	November 2004
Major General	Yuri Boryskin	November 2004	July 11, 2005
Lieutenant General	Volodymyr Zamana	July 11, 2005	May 2007
Lieutenant General	Serhiy Bessarab	May 2007	May 2012
