= Valeri Shmarov =

Valeri Shmarov may refer to:

- Valeriy Nikolayevich Shmarov (1945–2018), Ukrainian politician
- Valeri Valentinovich Shmarov (born 1965), Soviet and Russian soccer player
