= Volodymyr Shkidchenko =

Ukrainian military officer

- Володимир Шкідченко
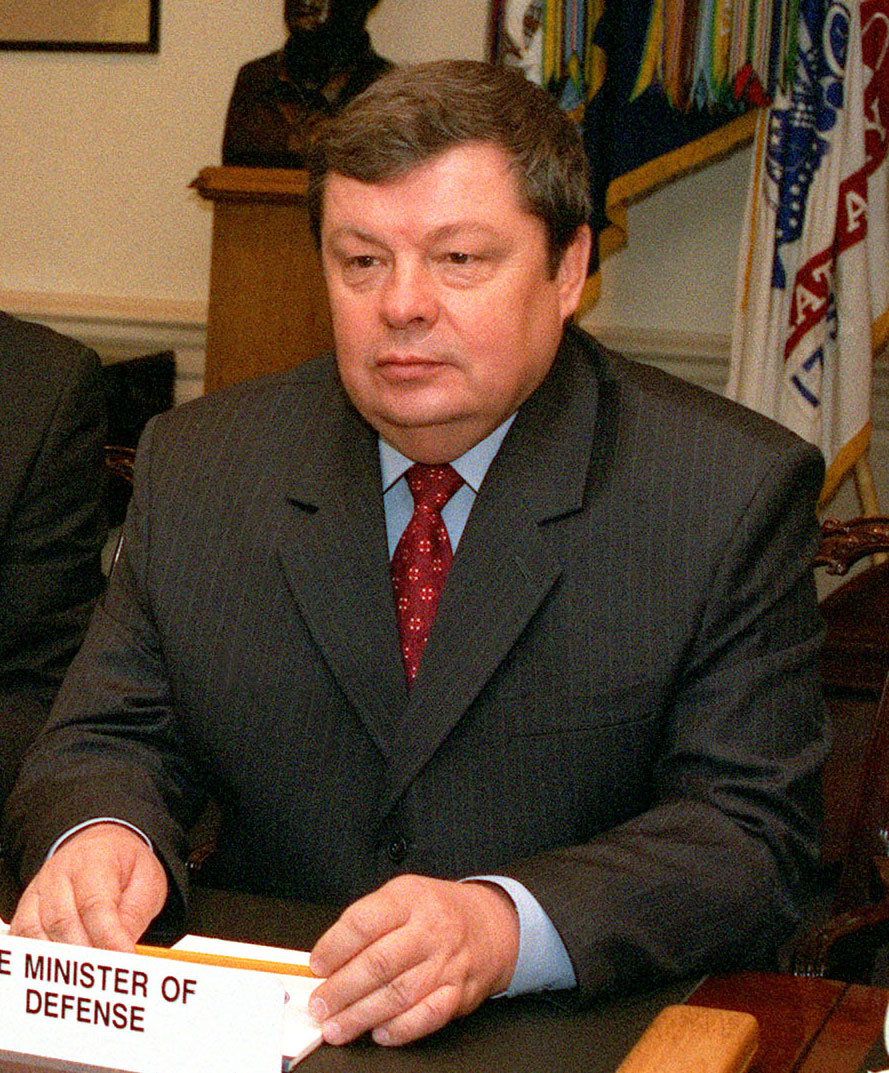
- Shkidchenko in 2002

5th Minister of Defence of Ukraine
- In office 12 November 2001 – 25 June 2003
- President: Leonid Kuchma
- Preceded by: Oleksandr Kuzmuk
- Succeeded by: Yevhen Marchuk

2nd Chief of the General Staff
- In office 30 September 1998 – 13 November 2001
- Preceded by: Oleksandr Zatynaiko
- Succeeded by: Petro Shulyak

Personal details
- Born: 1 January 1948 (age 78) Chita, Russian SFSR, Soviet Union (now Chita, Zabaykalsky Krai, Russia
- Awards: Order of Bohdan Khmelnytsky, 2nd & 3rd class

Military service
- Allegiance: Soviet Union (1970–1991); Ukraine (1991–2003)
- Branch/service: Soviet Army; Ukrainian Ground Forces
- Years of service: 1970–2003
- Rank: General of the army

Volodymyr Petrovych Shkidchenko (Ukrainian: Володимир Петрович Шкідченко; born January 1, 1948) is a Ukrainian military officer, General of Army of Ukraine. Minister of Defence of Ukraine from November 12, 2001 to June 25, 2003.

Military offices
Preceded by Vitaliy Radetsky	Commander of the 6th Army Corps; 1992–1993	Succeeded by Oleh Shustenko
Preceded by Vitaliy Radetsky	Commander of the OK South (Odessa Military District); 1993–1998	Succeeded by Oleksandr Zatynaiko
Preceded by Oleksandr Zatynaiko	Chief of the General Staff; 1998–2001	Succeeded by Mykola Palchuk
