= Kostyantyn Morozov =

Soviet-Ukrainian military commander (born 1944)

- Костянтин Морозов
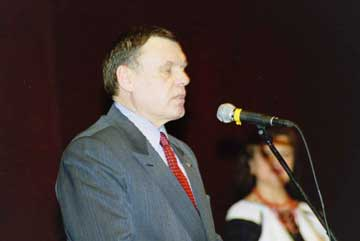
- Morozov in 2003

Ukrainian Ambassador to NATO
- In office 4 November 2005 – 15 October 2007
- President: Viktor Yushchenko
- Preceded by: Volodymyr Khandohiy
- Succeeded by: Ihor Sahach

Ukrainian Ambassador to Iran
- In office 4 April 2000 – 15 June 2001
- President: Leonid Kuchma
- Preceded by: Volodymyr Butyaha
- Succeeded by: Vadim Primachenko

1st Minister of Defence
- In office 3 September 1991 – 4 October 1993
- President: Verkhovna Rada Presidium; Leonid Kravchuk
- Preceded by: Office established
- Succeeded by: Ivan Bizhan (Acting)

Personal details
- Born: 3 June 1944 (age 82) Lozova Pavlivka, Ukrainian SSR, Soviet Union
- Awards

Military service
- Allegiance: Soviet Union
- Branch/service: Soviet Air Forces
- Years of service: 1967–1991
- Rank: Colonel general
- Commands: Moscow Military District; Turkestan Military District; Central Group of Forces; 46th Air Army (commanding); 17th Air Army (commanding)

Kostyantyn Petrovych Morozov (Note: Ukrainian: Костянтин Петрович Морозов, Russian: Константин Петрович Морозов, Konstantin Petrovich Morozov) (born 3 June 1944) is a Ukrainian government official and former Soviet military officer, who served as the first Minister of Defence of Ukraine starting from 1991. Morozov also briefly served as Ukraine's ambassador to Iran in 2000-2001 and as ambassador to NATO from 2005 to 2007. In his latter office, Morozov was a key figure in establishing Ukraine's policy of seeking to join NATO.

== Biography ==
=== Early life and Soviet service ===
Kostyantyn Morozov was born in a village of Lozova Pavlivka (today part of Brianka, in Luhansk Oblast) on 3 June 1944. His father, Petro Stepanovych Morozov, was an ethnically Russian mine electrician, and his mother was an ethnically Ukrainian school teacher. Petro Stepanovych died on the job when Kostyantyn was around 10 years old.

Morozov graduated from the Hrytsevych Higher Military Aviation College for the Air Force (later Ivan Kozhedub National University of the Air Force) for military pilots in Kharkiv in 1967, after which he served in the Soviet Air Forces' Northern Group. In 1975, Morozov graduated from the Gagarin Air Force Academy. Afterwards, Morozov held several commanding positions across the Soviet Union. From 1984 to 1986, he studied at and graduated from the Voroshilov Military Academy of General Staff of the Soviet Armed Forces (later Military Academy of the General Staff of the Armed Forces of Russia). During that period, Morozov also served as an air army chief of staff in Smolensk, and in 1988 was transferred to the same position of the 17th Air Army stationed in Kyiv. In 1990, Morozov was appointed the commander of that army.

=== Minister of Defence ===
Soon after the 1991 Soviet coup d'état attempt, Morozov was appointed by the Verkhovna Rada as the first Minister of Defence of independent Ukraine on 3 September 1991. He served in this position in the Fokin government and the Kuchma government. A week after his appointment, Morozov declared Ukraine's intention to create its own armed force during a meeting with Soviet defence minister Yevgeny Shaposhnikov. On 1 October 1991, he was dismissed as the commander of Kyiv Military District air army by the President of the Soviet Union and the Ministry of Defence of the Soviet Union. On 6 December 1991, Morozov pledged his allegiance to the people of Ukraine. This day is now celebrated as the Armed Forces Day in Ukraine.

On his post, Morozov promoted the democratization of armed forces and supported the vision of the People's Council fraction in respect to the development of Ukrainian military. On 16 September an initiative group in Kyiv started work on the new concept of national security. At the time, over 900,000 military servicemen and civil army workers were stationed in Ukraine. According to the ministry's plan, their number had to be reduced to 450,000. Starting from 1992 the General Staff began the process of transferring former Soviet officers into the Armed Forces of Ukraine, with those who refused being fired. The concept personally presented by Morozov in the Verkhovna Rada envisioned the disbandment of three military districts, eleven armies and the Black Sea Fleet, and their transformation into four operational commands, a separate corps in Crimea and the Ukrainian Navy.

Throughout the autumn of 1991, the organizational structure of the Armed Forces was established, and on 3 January 1992 28 generals and over 300 officers plegded their allegiance to Ukraine. Many of the new army's officers were ethnic Ukrainians previously stationed in various parts of the USSR and Warsaw Pact countries. Due to the generally poor knowledge of Ukrainian language among the staff, including Morozov himself, Russian was initially used as the language of documentation, with first ministerial orders written in Ukrainian appearing only in 1992. A big role in the Ukrainization of military staff was played by members of the Union of Officers of Ukraine.

=== Resignation and aftermath ===
Morozov opposed the subordination of parts of the Soviet Black Sea Fleet to Russia, and criticized the proposal to sell part of its property in exchange for Russian gas. His position went contrary to the opinion of both prime minister Leonid Kuchma and president Leonid Kravchuk. Due to his position regarding the fate of the Black Sea Fleet, Morozov voluntarily resigned from his post on 4 October 1993.

After his dismissal from the ministry and the Armed Forces of Ukraine, Morozov participated in various public activities: a Coordination Council member of the Ukrainian Intelligentsia Congress, leader of the electoral public organization "Democratic Association Ukraine", coordinator of democratic parties of Ukraine, a member of the Ukrainian-American consulting committee in policy development. In 1994-95, he studied English, foundations of state administration, and international security policy at the John F. Kennedy School of Government (Harvard University).

From 2000 to 2001, Morozov was the Ambassador of Ukraine to Iran. In 2003, Morozov graduated from the Open International University of Human Development "Ukraine". From 2005 to 2007, he headed the Ukraine mission to NATO, but resigned following a change in government policy towards Ukrainian integration into NATO.

== Honours ==
=== Soviet Union ===
- Order "For Service to the Homeland in the Armed Forces of the USSR", 3rd Class (1982)
- Order "For Service to the Homeland in the Armed Forces of the USSR", 2nd Class (1990)

=== Ukraine ===
- Order for Courage, 3rd Class (1996)

== See also ==
- Ihor Sahach
- Ihor Dolhov

== Bibliography ==
- Morozov, K. Above and beyond: From Soviet general to Ukrainian state builder. Introd. by Sherman W. Garnett. Cambridge: Harvard University Publishing, 2000. 295. XXII. ISBN 0-916458-77-6
