= Ivan Bizhan =

Soviet and Ukrainian general

- Іван Біжан

Minister of Defense of Ukraine
- In office 4 October 1993 – 8 October 1993
- Preceded by: Kostyantyn Morozov
- Succeeded by: Vitaliy Radetsky

Personal details
- Born: Ivan Vasylovych Bizhan; 25 December 1941 Yalanets, Tomashpil Raion Transnistria Governorate, Kingdom of Romania

Military service
- Allegiance: Soviet Union; Ukraine
- Branch/service: Ukrainian Ground Forces
- Rank: Colonel General

Colonel General Ivan Vasylyovych Bizhan (Ukrainian: Іван Васильович Біжан; born 25 December 1941), is a Ukrainian military officer who served as acting Minister of Defense in October 1993.

Bizhan has taken one of the most active roles in reestablishing of the Ukrainian Armed Forces in the beginning of 1990s. On 7 April 1992, he was member of Ukrainian delegation to Sevastopol led by the First Deputy Chairman of Verkhovna Rada Vasyl Durdynets and left for Sevastopol for official ceremony of presenting a commander of the revived Ukrainian Navy, rear admiral Borys Kozhyn and accept the oath of allegiance of sailors who decided to join Ukrainian Navy. In June 1993, Bizhan also was a member of Ukrainian delegation in negotiations with the Russian Federation over the future 1997 friendship treaty.

Military offices
Preceded by Vasyl Sobkov	(acting) Chief of the General Staff; 1992 – 1993	Succeeded by Anatoliy Lopata
Preceded by Kostyantyn Morozov	(acting) Minister of Defence; 1993	Succeeded by Vitaliy Radetsky
