= Vitaliy Radetsky =

Ukrainian military, General of the Army (born 1944)

General of the Army Vitaliy Radetsky
- Віталій Радецький

Minister of Defense
- In office 8 October 1993 – 25 August 1994
- Preceded by: Ivan Bizhan (acting)
- Succeeded by: Valeriy Shmarov

Personal details
- Born: 1 January 1944 Khrystynivka, Ukrainian SSR, Soviet Union

Military service
- Allegiance: Soviet Union; Ukraine
- Branch/service: Soviet Army; Ukrainian Ground Forces
- Years of service: 1964–2005
- Rank: General of the Army of Ukraine
- Commands: Southern Operational Command (1992-1993)

General of the Army Vitalii Hryhorovych Radetskyi (Ukrainian: Віталій Григорович Радецький; born 1 January 1944) is a Ukrainian former army general. He served as the Minister of Defence from 1993 to 1994, and was chief of the National Defence University of Ukraine from 2005 to 2010. He also was the last commander of the Odessa Military District when it was transformed into the Southern Operational Command.

== Before military service ==
He was born in the village of Khrystynivka, Ukrainian SSR, Soviet Union. He is Ukrainian. He graduated from Railway School No. 18 and the Odessa Mechanical and Technological College. From 1963, he worked as a foreman at the Odessa Flour Mill.

== Military service ==
In 1968, he graduated from the Kiev Higher Combined Arms Command School. He was the school's heavyweight boxing champion. He was platoon leader, company commander, and deputy battalion commander in the Baltic Military District from 1968 to 1971, and a battalion commander from 1971 to 1975 in the Far Eastern Military District. In 1975, he graduated from the Frunze Military Academy. In 1989, he graduated from the Military Academy of the General Staff. He was First Deputy Commander of the 13th Combined Arms Army in the Carpathian Military District from May 1989 to May 1991 and Commander of the 6th Guards Tank Army of the Odessa Military District from May 1991.

== Ukraninan government ==
He was one of the first to transfer to the Armed Forces of Ukraine after the collapse of the USSR and took the Ukrainian oath. In January 1992, he was appointed commander of the Odessa Military District. From 4 October 1993 to 10 October 1994, he was the Minister of Defense of Ukraine. He was awarded the military rank of General of the Army of Ukraine on 30 November 1993 (the first to be awarded this rank).

He actively supported Ukrainian President Leonid Kravchuk during the 1994 Ukrainian presidential election campaign. After Leonid Kuchma's victory in the Ukrainian presidential election, he was immediately removed from his post and in August 1995, was appointed Chief Inspector of the Ministry of Defense of Ukraine. He participated in the 1998 Ukrainian parliamentary election for the Verkhovna Rada as a candidate from the Bloc of Democracies – NEP. From May 2005 to retirement, he headed the National Defence University of Ukraine. In January 2009, he was discharged from military service due to age.

Military offices
Preceded by Volodymyr Tolubko	Chief of the National University of Defense of Ukraine; 2005–2010	Succeeded by Vasyl Telelym
Preceded by Ivan Bizhan as acting	Minister of Defence; 1993–1994	Succeeded by Valeriy Shmarov
Preceded by Ivan Morozov	Commander of the Odesa Military District; 1992–1993	Succeeded by Volodymyr Shkidchenko
Preceded by	Commander of the 6th Guards Tank Army; 1991–1992	Succeeded by Volodymyr Shkidchenko
