= Oleksandr Kuzmuk =

Ukrainian military commander and politician

- Олександр Кузьмук
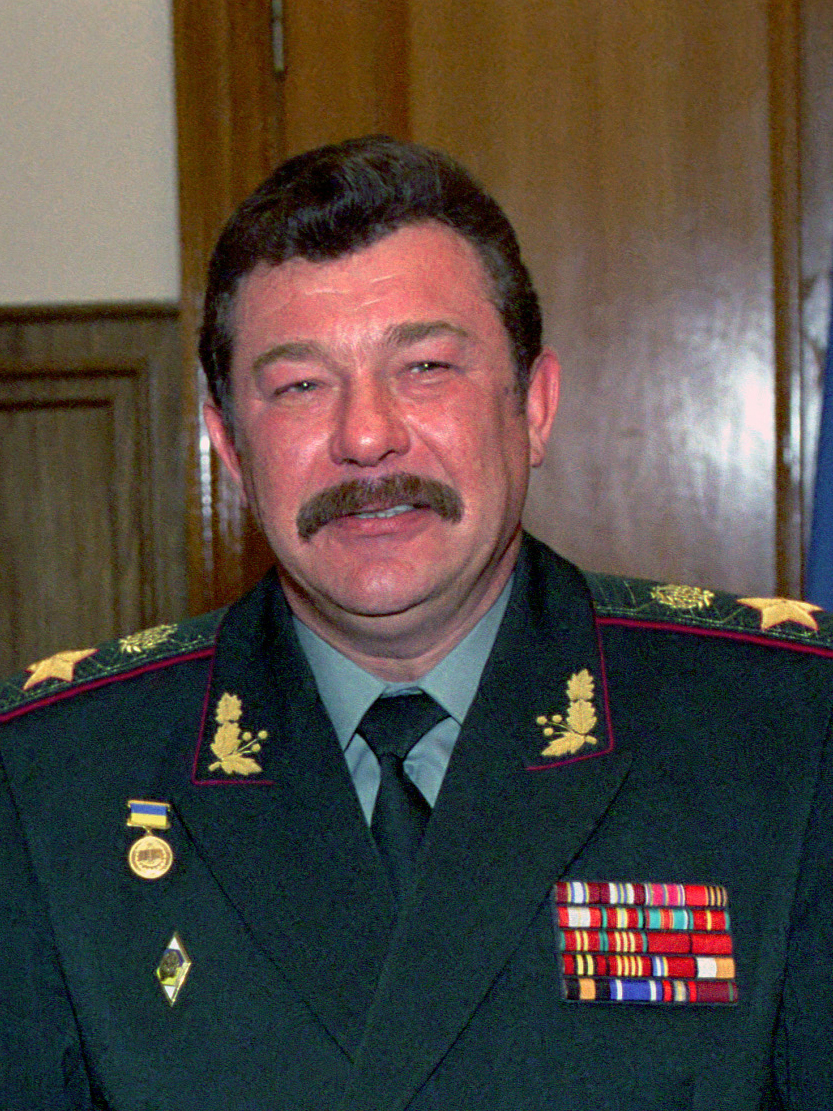
- Kuzmuk in 2001

4th and 7th Minister of Defence of Ukraine
- In office 24 September 2004 – 3 February 2005
- President: Leonid Kuchma
- Preceded by: Yevhen Marchuk
- Succeeded by: Anatoliy Hrytsenko
- In office 11 July 1996 – 24 October 2001
- President: Leonid Kuchma
- Preceded by: Valeriy Shmarov
- Succeeded by: Volodymyr Shkidchenko

Personal details
- Born: 17 April 1954 (age 72) Diatylivka, Khmelnytskyi Oblast, Ukrainian SSR, Soviet Union
- Party: Party of Regions
- Spouse: Lyudmila Kuzmuk
- Children: 2
- Education: Kharkiv Higher Armor Command College; Malinovsky Military Armored Forces Academy

Military service
- Allegiance: Soviet Union (to 1991); Ukraine
- Branch/service: Soviet Army; Ukrainian Ground Forces
- Years of service: 1975–2019, 2022–present
- Rank: General of Army of Ukraine
- Commands: 32nd Army Corps; Ukrainian National Guard

Oleksandr Ivanovych Kuzmuk (Ukrainian: Олександр Іванович Кузьмук; born 17 April 1954) is a Ukrainian politician and military commander, who was a member of the Party of Regions and also served as Minister of Defence of Ukraine on two occasions, from 1996 to 2001 and from 2004 to 2005. Kuzmuk formerly commanded the National Guard of Ukraine (1995–1996) and holds the highest rank in the Ukrainian military, General of the Army of Ukraine (1998). He was an Advisor to the Commander of the Territorial Defence Forces of Ukraine (2022–2025).

== Early life and career ==
Oleksandr Ivanovych Kuzmuk was born on 17 April 1954 into the family of military officer Ivan Fedorovych Kuzmuk (died 1973) and Rayisa Mykhailivna Kuzmuk, in the village of Diatylivka, in the Slavuta Raion of Khmelnytskyi Oblast. In 1975, he graduated the Kharkiv Higher Armor Command College.

== Soviet military career ==
From 1975 to 1978, Kuzmuk served as platoon leader of armour forces, before becoming the commander of a tank company in 1978, and then deputy chief of staff of a tank regiment. From 1980 to 1983, he was an audit student in the command department of the Malinovsky Military Armored Forces Academy, in Moscow. After that, until 1988 Kuzmuk was an instructor at the academy, first as a commander of a battalion of tanks and special vehicles, then of a tank training regiment.

From 1988 to 1992, he served as deputy commander of a motor-rifle division. Following the collapse of the Soviet Union, he joined the Armed Forces of Ukraine, becoming commander of a motor-rifle division. From 1993 to 1995, he was commander of the 32nd Army Corps and therefore the senior military chief of Crimea.

Over the course of his military career, Kuzmuk served in the Group of Soviet Forces in Germany, and the Belorussian, Moscow, Leningrad, Carpathian, and Odessa Military Districts.

== Career in independent Ukraine ==
From 1995 to 1996, Kuzmuk was commander of the National Guard of Ukraine. In 1996 he was appointed Minister of Defence. In late 2001, Kuzmuk was dismissed following the shootdown of Siberia Airlines 1812 over the Black Sea, which was widely blamed on Ukrainian armed forces.

After finishing his military career, Kuzmuk became a politician by participating in the 2002 Ukrainian parliamentary election on the party list of the For United Ukraine! alliance. Soon after winning multiple seats in the Verkhovna Rada, however, the alliance collapsed, and Kuzmuk stayed with the Labour Ukraine party, an off-shot of the Labour Party of Ukraine. During that time in 2004, he was again appointed the Minister of Defence, while keeping his parliamentary seat. After the Orange Revolution, Kuzmuk lost his ministerial seat, and was replaced by Anatoliy Hrytsenko.

From May 25 to December 18, 2007, he was Vice Prime Minister of Ukraine.

In the 2012 Ukrainian parliamentary election, Kuzmuk was elected into the Verkhovna Rada as a member of Party of Regions.

In the 2014 parliamentary election, Kuzmuk tried to win a seat through winning electoral district 38 situated in Novomoskovsk, Dnipropetrovsk Oblast, but failed, finishing in third place with 12.78% of the vote. The announcement of the final result for electoral district 38 (won by Vadym Nesterenko) was delayed until mid-November because Kuzmuk challenged the results in court, claiming Nesterenko was guilty of fraud and bribery of voters.

In 2019, Kuzmuk was dismissed from the Armed Forces having reached the retirement age of 65. However, following the 2022 Russian invasion of Ukraine, he subsequently volunteered for the Territorial Defence.

=== Advisor to the Commander of the Territorial Defense Forces (Ukraine) ===
In February 2022, he became a special advisor to the Commander of the Territorial Defense Forces of Ukraine. On December 7, 2025, he was dismissed following an investigation over his reinstatement and the presentation of awards to military personnel, even though he had served as Minister of Defense during the Kuchma administration and was a member of the Yanukovych government.

== Awards and decorations ==
Kuzmuk has been awarded the following awards and decorations:

- Award of the Ministry of Defense of Ukraine for "Valor and Honor"
- Honorary pistol
- Order of Bohdan Khmelnytsky, 1st Class
- Order of Bohdan Khmelnytsky, 2nd Class
- Order of Bohdan Khmelnytsky, 3rd Class
- Order of Danylo Halytsky
- Order of Merit, 3rd Class

Military offices
Preceded by Volodymyr Kukharets	National Guard Commander; 1995–1996	Succeeded by Ihor Valkiv
Preceded by	Commander of the 32nd Army Corps; 1993–1995	Succeeded by
