= Valeriy Shmarov =

Ukrainian politician (1945–2018)

- Валерій Шмаров
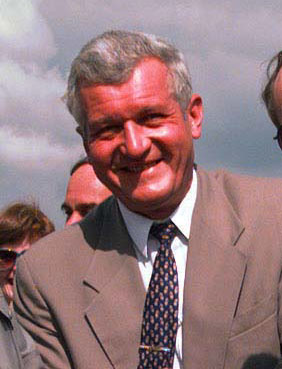
- Shmarov in 1996

Minister of Defence
- In office 10 October 1994 – 8 July 1996
- Preceded by: Vitaliy Radetsky
- Succeeded by: Oleksandr Kuzmuk

Personal details
- Born: 14 August 1945 Tomashpil Raion, Ukrainian SSR, Soviet Union
- Died: 14 October 2018 (aged 73) Kyiv, Ukraine
- Spouse: Olha Viktorivna
- Children: Kateryna (1968); Tymur (1972)
- Education: Kyiv University

Military service
- Allegiance: Soviet Union
- Years of service: July 1972 – May 1973

Valeriy Mykolaiovych Shmarov (Ukrainian: Валерій Миколайович Шмаров; 14 August 1945 – 14 October 2018) was a Ukrainian politician and aerospace engineer. He served as the third Minister of Defence of Ukraine between 10 October 1994 and 8 July 1996.

== Biography ==
Shmarov was born on 14 August 1945 in the village of Zholoby in central Ukraine. He graduated from the Kyiv College of Information Systems and Technologies as a radio mechanic in 1966, and from the Taras Shevchenko National University of Kyiv as an economist in 1972.

From 1966 to 1987, he worked at the Kiev Radio Factory in many positions, ranging from a regulator of radio equipment to a production director. He participated in creating control systems for several generations of strategic missiles and spacecraft, including the complex "Energia-Buran".

Between 1988 and 1992, he was the director of the Zhulyany Machine-Building Plant, which produced guided surface-to-air missiles for the S-300 systems.

From 1992 to 1993, he was the First Deputy Director General of the National Space Agency of Ukraine. He participated in the development and implementation of the National Space Program of Ukraine.

From 1993 to 1995, he was a Vice-Prime Minister of Ukraine responsible for the military-industrial complex.

Shmarov was appointed Minister of Defence in 1994. He was the first civilian to hold the office of minister of defence in any Commonwealth of Independent States member state. Shmarov was described by political scientist Taras Kuzio as "strongly in favour of Ukraine's nuclear disarmament", and his appointment was part of a broader effort by President Leonid Kuchma to assert political control over the Armed Forces of Ukraine. He was criticised by Ukrainian national democrats for perceived Russophilia; Kuzio notes that he once sued the Evening Kyiv for libel after it called him a Russophile. National democratic circles also criticised Shmarov's efforts to reform the military. Kuchma dismissed him on 11 July 1996 for being unable to "carry out the role assigned to him".

From 1997, he was an honorary president of the Association of Aviation Enterprises of Ukraine (Ukraviaprom).

Beginning in 1998, Shmarov worked at the National Aviation University as an associate professor, then professor, and finally became director of the Aerospace Institute of National Aviation University in 2005.

From 1998 to 2002, Shmarov was a People's Deputy of Ukraine, and he served in the Verkhovna Rada Defence and Security Committee.

In early 2002, he became a member of the Presidium of the Aerospace Society of Ukraine.

From 2002 to 2005, he was a director-general of the State company of export and import of products and services for military and special purposes "Ukrspetsexport".

He became a professor in 2004, and a Doctor of Technical Sciences in 2006. He wrote more than 40 scientific publications, three patents, and was editor-in-chief of the scientific journal Astronomical School's Report.

Shmarov died on 14 October 2018 at the age of 73.

== Awards ==
- Order of the Badge of Honour – 1976
- Order of the Red Banner of Labour – 1988
- State Prize of Ukraine in Science and Technology – 2002
- Order of Merit, Third Class – 2010

Political offices
Preceded by Vitalyi Radetskyi	Minister of Defence; 1994–1996	Succeeded by Oleksandr Kuzmuk
