= Valerii Zaluzhnyi =

Ukrainian general and diplomat (born 1973)

- Валерій Залужний
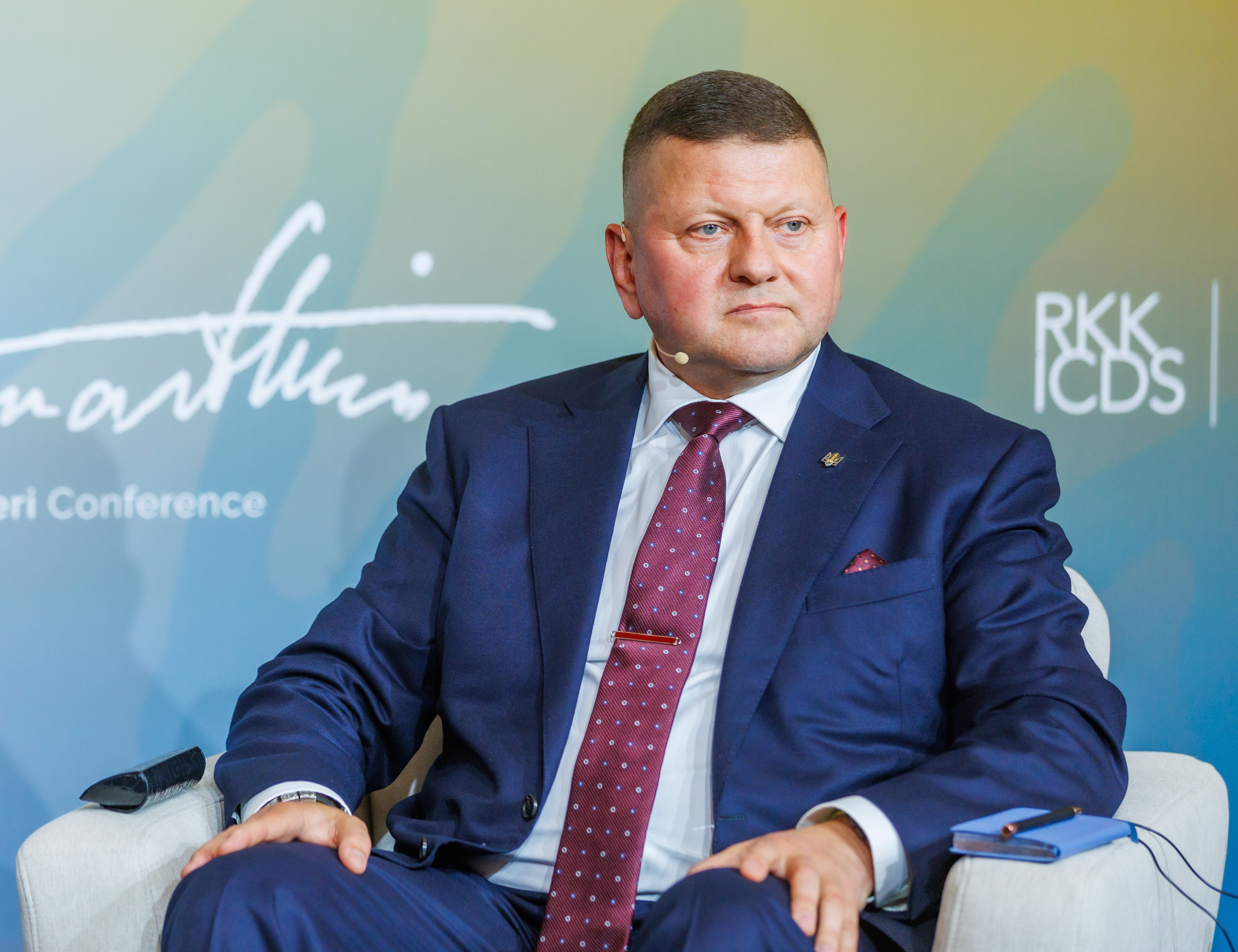
- Official portrait, 2026

Ambassador of Ukraine to the United Kingdom
- Incumbent
- Assumed office 10 July 2024
- President: Volodymyr Zelenskyy
- Prime Minister: Denys Shmyhal; Yulia Svyrydenko
- Preceded by: Vadym Prystaiko

Permanent Representative of Ukraine to the International Maritime Organization
- Incumbent
- Assumed office 3 March 2025
- President: Volodymyr Zelenskyy
- Prime Minister: Denys Shmyhal; Yulia Svyrydenko

Commander-in-Chief of the Armed Forces of Ukraine
- In office 27 July 2021 – 8 February 2024
- President: Volodymyr Zelenskyy
- Prime Minister: Denys Shmyhal
- Preceded by: Ruslan Khomchak
- Succeeded by: Oleksandr Syrskyi

Personal details
- Born: Valerii Fedorovych Zaluzhnyi; 8 July 1973 (age 53) Novograd-Volynsky, Ukrainian SSR, Soviet Union
- Education: Ivan Chernyakhovsky National Defense University of Ukraine; Odesa Military Academy; National University Ostroh Academy
- Nickname: "Iron General"

Military service
- Allegiance: Ukraine
- Years of service: 1993–2024
- Rank: General
- Commands: Commander-in-Chief of the Armed Forces of Ukraine; Operational Command North; Joint Operational Headquarters of the Armed Forces of Ukraine; Operational Command West; 51st Guards Mechanized Brigade; 24th Guards Mechanized Brigade
- Battles/wars: Russo-Ukrainian War; War in Donbas; Russian invasion of Ukraine
- Awards: Hero of Ukraine; Cross of Military Merit; Order of Bohdan Khmelnytsky, 3rd class; Officer's Cross of the Order of the Cross of Vytis; The insignia "Personalized firearm"

Valerii Fedorovych Zaluzhnyi (Note: Sometimes transliterated as Valery or Valeriy Zaluzhny) (Ukrainian: Валерій Федорович Залужний; born 8 July 1973) is a Ukrainian four-star general and diplomat who is currently serving as Ambassador of Ukraine to the United Kingdom. He served as the Commander-in-Chief of the Armed Forces of Ukraine from 27 July 2021 until 8 February 2024. He was also concurrently a member of the National Security and Defense Council of Ukraine.

Zaluzhnyi was previously the Commander of the North Operational Command (2019–2021), Chief of the Joint Operational Staff of the Armed Forces of Ukraine – First Deputy Commander of the Joint Forces (2018), Chief of Staff – First Deputy Commander of the West Operational Command (2017), and Commander of the 51st Guards Mechanized Brigade (2009–2012).

Zaluzhnyi was named by Time magazine as one of the 100 most influential people in the world in 2022. He has received praise for his skill at "adapting to a fast-changing battlefield" through effective delegation and information gathering during the Russian invasion of Ukraine. He was dismissed from his position as Commander-in-Chief on 8 February 2024 amid increasing tension between him and President Volodymyr Zelenskyy.

Zaluzhnyi was appointed the Ukrainian ambassador to the United Kingdom in March 2024, and was additionally named Ukraine's permanent representative to the International Maritime Organization in March 2025. Zaluzhnyi has been cited as a potential candidate for the next Ukrainian presidential election and ranked in polls among leading candidates.

== Early life and education ==
Zaluzhnyi was born on 8 July 1973 in Novohrad-Volynskyi, Soviet Union (now Zviahel, Ukraine). In 1989, Zaluzhnyi graduated from the city School No. 9 and entered the Zviahel Machine-Building Technical School, from which he graduated in 1991 with honours. He later entered the general military faculty of the Odesa Institute of Land Forces. In 1997, he graduated with honours from the institute, after which he passed all stages of military service: platoon commander, training platoon commander, combat platoon commander, training company commander, cadet company commander, and battalion commander.

== Military career ==
In 2005, he entered the National Academy of Defence of Ukraine. In 2007, he graduated with a gold medal and was appointed Chief of Staff and First Deputy Commander of the 24th Mechanized Brigade in Yavoriv, Lviv Oblast. He successfully served in this position for two and a half years. In October 2009, he was appointed commander of the 51st Mechanized Brigade, which he led until 2012.

=== 2014–2021: Russo-Ukrainian war ===
In 2014, Zaluzhnyi graduated from the Ivan Cherniakhovskyi National Defence University of Ukraine. In 2017, he was appointed Chief of Staff – First Deputy Commander of the Operational Command West. The next year, Zaluzhnyi was appointed Chief of the Joint Operational Staff of the Armed Forces of Ukraine – First Deputy Commander of the Joint Forces.

According to an interview with The Washington Post, in 2019, Zaluzhnyi was detained at the airport in Brussels, where he had arrived to participate in the NATO summit. The reason was that he was put on the international wanted list at the request of the Russian Federation. During his detention by Interpol, he managed to call Ukraine's ambassador to NATO, who subsequently resolved the situation.

In December 2019, he was appointed Commander of the Operational Command North. In December 2020 he graduated from the National University Ostroh Academy with a master's degree in International Relations.

=== 2021–2024: Commander-in-Chief of the Armed Forces of Ukraine ===
On 27 July 2021, President Volodymyr Zelenskyy appointed Zaluzhnyi as Commander-in-Chief of the Armed Forces of Ukraine, replacing General Ruslan Khomchak in this position. The following day he was also appointed as a member of the National Security and Defense Council of Ukraine.

Zaluzhnyi is widely regarded as an open-minded officer. Having never served in the Soviet military, Zaluzhnyi represented a new generation of Ukrainian officers, radically departing from established Soviet military practices. One of his first steps in office was to allow the military at the front to open fire in response to the enemy without the consent of the upper leadership and eliminate the need for the military to fill in unnecessary documents. Regarding his priorities as Commander-in-Chief, Zaluzhnyi said in 2021:

The overall course of reforming Ukraine's Armed Forces in line with NATO principles and standards remains irreversible. And the key here is the principles. Changes must take place primarily in the worldview and attitude toward people. I would like you to turn your face to the people, to your subordinates. My attitude towards people has not changed throughout my service.

According to an investigation by The Guardian, in the period preceding the full-scale invasion, Zaluzhnyi lacked the legal authority to redeploy troops before martial law was declared. In January 2022, he moved to the General Staff headquarters complex, and in February the senior command conducted command-post exercises covering various invasion scenarios, including an attack on Kyiv. As Commander-in-Chief of the Armed Forces of Ukraine, Valerii Zaluzhnyi combined strategic planning with decentralized command, maintaining direct communication with brigade commanders.

On 5 March 2022, 10 days after the Russian invasion of Ukraine, President Zelenskyy promoted him to the rank of General, the highest possible rank in the Ukrainian Armed Forces. International experts and analysts have given Zaluzhnyi high marks for the effectiveness of his command at the front against the Russian military. Reporting by The Washington Post in 2023 and The Wall Street Journal in 2024 alleged that Zaluzhnyi and other Ukrainians carried out the 2022 Nord Stream pipeline sabotage. He has not been formally connected to the event by Ukraine or international governments, and has denied involvement.

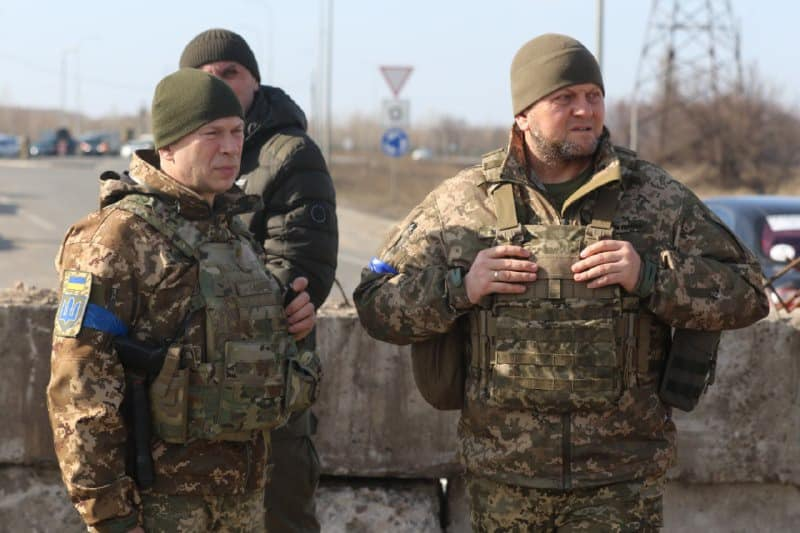
Zaluzhnyi with Colonel General Oleksandr Syrskyi (left) during the Battle of Kyiv, March 2022

Zaluzhny has been among the most popular people in Ukraine in 2022, in January 2023, when he was liked by 87% of Ukrainian respondents and disliked by 4%, and in December 2023 when 88% of Ukrainians expressed trust in Zaluzhnyi. In January 2023, he received a US$1 million inheritance from Gregory Stepanets, a Ukrainian-American. Zaluzhny donated it all to the Ukrainian Armed Forces and humanitarian nonprofits in Ukraine.

In June 2023, Zaluzhnyi appealed to Western allies to supply Ukraine with F-16 fighter jets and MGM-140 ATACMS tactical ballistic missiles, saying Ukraine's counter-offensive was being slowed by a lack of modern fighter jets and artillery ammunition. He told The Economist in an interview published on 1 November 2023, "Just like in the First World War we have reached the level of technology that puts us into a stalemate. There will most likely be no deep and beautiful breakthrough." Zaluzhnyi said he underestimated the Russian leadership's willingness to sacrifice its soldiers, saying that "Russia has lost at least 150,000 dead. In any other country such casualties would have stopped the war." Zaluzhnyi's statement that the war had reached a "stalemate" was publicly criticised by President Zelenskyy.

In December 2023, the Ukrainian Ministry of Defense led by Rustem Umerov proposed to mobilise 450,000 to 500,000 additional Ukrainian citizens, including Ukrainian men living abroad, into the Ukrainian Armed Forces. On 26 December, Zaluzhnyi said that the military command had not formally requested the mobilisation, but the Ukrainian General Staff believed that 450–500,000 citizens should be mobilised to create new military units, while "forecasting the losses we may incur next year."

On 2 February 2024, Zaluzhnyi wrote that "the weakness of the international sanctions' regime means Russia ... is still able to deploy its military-industrial complex in pursuit of a war of attrition against us. We must acknowledge the significant advantage enjoyed by [Russia] in mobilizing human resources and how that compares with the inability of state institutions in Ukraine to improve the manpower levels of our armed forces without the use of unpopular measures." He concluded that "the number one priority here is mastery of an entire arsenal of (relatively) cheap, modern and highly effective, unmanned vehicles and other technological means ... this means nothing less than the wholesale redesign of battlefield operations – and the abandoning of outdated, stereotypical thinking."

On 8 February 2024, Zaluzhnyi was replaced as Commander-in-Chief by Oleksandr Syrskyi, previously the commander of the Ukrainian Ground Forces. Following his replacement, he was decorated with the award Hero of Ukraine by Zelenskyy. The dismissal came amid increasing tension between him and Zelenskyy. He was formally dismissed from the military by Zelenskyy on "health grounds" on 9 May, but was allowed to wear a military uniform.

== Post-military career ==
=== 2024–present: Ambassador of Ukraine to the United Kingdom ===
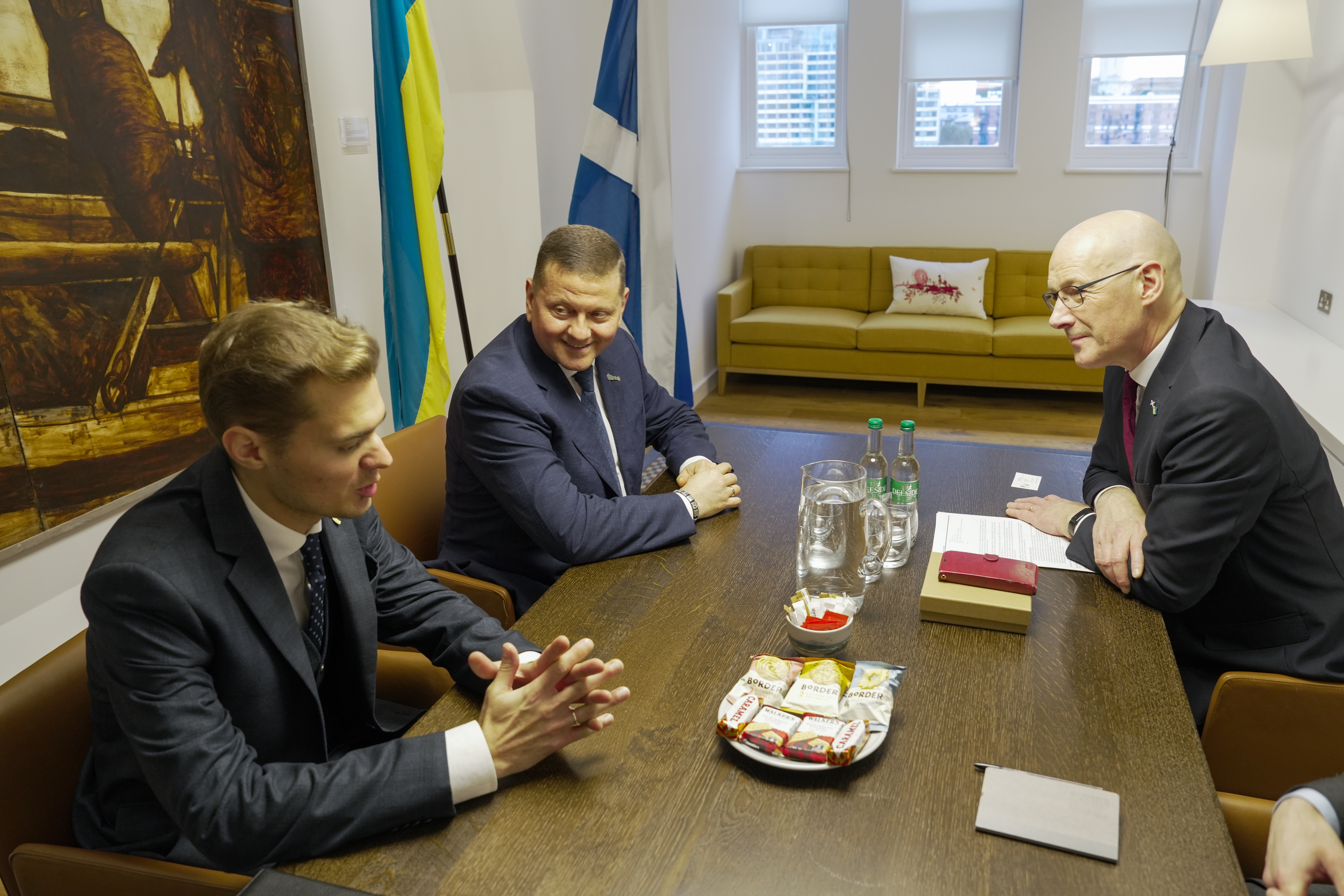
Zaluzhnyi (centre) meeting with First Minister of Scotland John Swinney (right) in October 2024

On 7 March 2024, Zelenskyy named Zaluzhnyi as the new Ukrainian ambassador to the UK. He formally presented his credentials on 10 July 2024. On 20 December 2024, Zaluzhnyi released his memoir titled My War, the first part of a planned three-volume autobiography. The book was edited by his wife. On 3 March 2025, Zelenskyy appointed Zaluzhnyi as Ukraine's Permanent Representative to the International Maritime Organization, in addition to his role as ambassador to the UK.

Speaking at Chatham House in March 2025, Zaluzhnyi argued that the existing international order was being undermined, including by U.S. policy, and warned that Europe could become Russia's next target. He also criticized what he described as the West's tendency to respond with expressions of concern rather than effective deterrence, calling for a reassessment of the international security architecture and emphasizing Ukraine's central role within it.

In May 2025, speaking by video to a technological weapons forum in Kyiv, Zaluzhnyi said "I hope that there are not people in this room who still hope for some kind of miracle or lucky sign that will bring peace to Ukraine, the borders of 1991 or 2022" and he recommended the approach of a hi-tech war of survival given Ukraine's smaller army and difficult economic circumstances. He said "Ukraine is not capable of another war in terms of demography and economy".

In December 2025, The New Voice of Ukraine reported that Zaluzhnyi had informed President Zelenskyy of his intention to resign in early January 2026, and had discussed potential future roles with Zelenskyy including prime minister or head of the Office of the President. Other sources said Zaluzhnyi had considered the roles of Ambassador to the United States, or returning to the post of commander-in-chief of the Armed Forces.

In February 2026, he gave an interview to the Associated Press. In it he discussed the rift between himself and Zelenskyy and indicated a possible desire to stand for the presidency. He said that in 2022 the Security Service of Ukraine (SBU) had raided his command centre while over a dozen British officers were there, and he had responded by telling Zelenskyy's chief of staff that he was prepared to call in military forces to protect his command centre if the raid continued. Zaluzhnyi alleged that the raid had been made to intimidate him. He also said a dispute over the failed 2023 Ukrainian counteroffensive was particularly contentious between Zelenskyy and him. In July 2026, Ukrainska Pravda reported that he had informed Zelenskyy he would run for president.

After completing his tenure as Commander-in-Chief of the Armed Forces of Ukraine and being appointed Ambassador of Ukraine to the United Kingdom, Zaluzhnyi published a series of articles and speeches in 2024–2025 on the transformation of modern warfare and international security. He argued that the widespread use of drones, electronic warfare, and battlefield awareness systems had fundamentally changed combat by making the battlefield "transparent" and contributing to positional warfare.

Zaluzhnyi also emphasized the growing role of artificial intelligence, autonomous systems, and attritional warfare.

== Military ranks ==
- Major general (23 August 2017)
- Lieutenant general (24 August 2021)
- General (4 March 2022)

== Awards ==
Ukrainian

- Hero of Ukraine (9 February 2024)
- Cross of Military Merit (6 May 2022)
- Order of Bohdan Khmelnytsky, 3rd class (12 December 2016)
- The insignia "Personalized firearm" (26 July 2023)
- All-Ukrainian Literary and Art Prize named after Bohdan and Levko Lepkyi Brothers (2022)
- Order of Saint Great-Martyr George the Victorybearer (21 December 2022)
- Honorary citizen of Yavoriv (2023)

Foreign

- Officer's Cross of the Order of the Cross of Vytis (6 July 2023, Lithuania)

== Legacy ==
In February 2023, the village of Vatutine, Kharkiv Oblast was set to be renamed Zaluzhne in honour of Zaluzhnyi. Streets in Pokrov, Stara Syniava, Konotop, and Malyn are named after him.

== Family ==
Zaluzhnyi is married with two daughters. His older daughter serves in the military; his younger is studying to become a physician.
