= Serhiy Shaptala =

Ukrainian general (born 1973)

- Сергій Шаптала
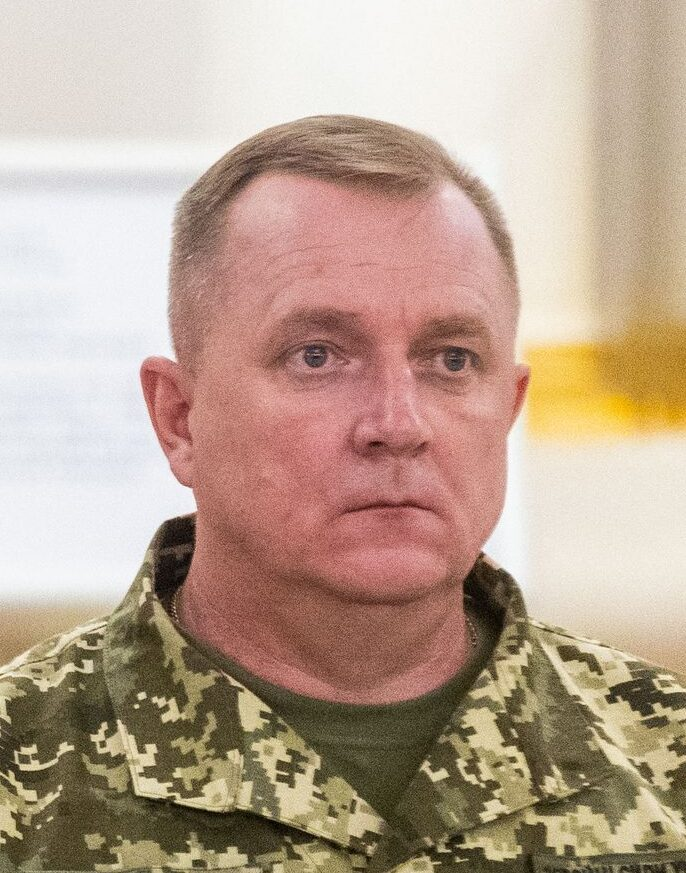
- Shaptala in 2022

15th Chief of the General Staff
- In office 28 July 2021 – 9 February 2024
- President: Volodymyr Zelenskyy
- Preceded by: Serhiy Korniychuk
- Succeeded by: Anatoliy Barhylevych

Personal details
- Born: 5 February 1973 (age 53) Kostiantynivka, Cherkasy Oblast, Ukrainian SSR, Soviet Union
- Education: Ivan Chernyakhovsky National Defense University of Ukraine

Military service
- Allegiance: Ukraine
- Branch/service: Ukrainian Ground Forces
- Years of service: 1994–present
- Rank: Lieutenant general
- Battles/wars: Russo-Ukrainian War; Battle of Debaltseve
- Awards: Hero of Ukraine; Order of Bohdan Khmelnytsky

Serhiy Oleksandrovych Shaptala (Ukrainian: Сергій Олександрович Шаптала; born 5 February 1973) is a Ukrainian military officer who served as Chief of the General Staff from 2021 until 2024, holding the rank of Lieutenant general.

In 2015, he was awarded Hero of Ukraine by President Petro Poroshenko for his command of the 128th Brigade during the Battle of Debaltseve.

During the 2022 Russian invasion of Ukraine, Shaptala said Ukrainian air defences shot down a Russian Il-76, and shared video footage of a Ukrainian Bayraktar TB2 striking Russian targets.

== Awards ==
- Order of Bohdan Khmelnytsky 3d class (February 26, 2015)
- Hero of Ukraine with the Order of the Golden Star (February 18, 2015)
