= Volodymyr Zamana =

Ukrainian general (born 1959)

- Володимир Михайлович Замана
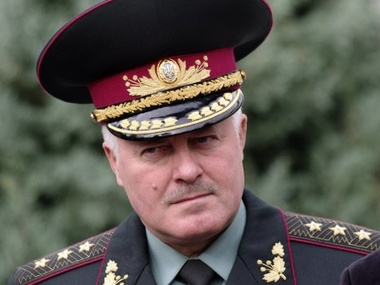
- Born: Volodymyr Zamana; 3 December 1959 (age 66); Ombysh Village, Chernihiv Oblast, Ukrainian SSR, Soviet Union
- Spouse(s): Married, son and two daughters.
- Military career
- Allegiance: Soviet Union (to 1991); Ukraine
- Branch: Soviet Army; Ukrainian Ground Forces
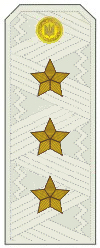
- Rank: Colonel General

Volodymyr Mykhailovych Zamana (Ukrainian: Володимир Михайлович Замана; born 3 December 1959) is a Ukrainian colonel general, and Chief of the General Staff from 2012 to 2014. On 19 February 2014, at the height of the February 2014 Euromaidan riots, president Viktor Yanukovych dismissed Zamana from his position as Chief of the General Staff, replacing him with pro-Russian Admiral Yuriy Ilyin. After Yanukovych fled the country for Russia, Zamana was installed as a parliamentary commissioner in control of defence minister by the Parliament of Ukraine on 22 February 2014.

On 25 February 2019 Zamana was detained on charges of high treason. The Ukrainian military prosecutor's office claimed that because he had, while in office, deprived Ukraine of its air defense system.

== Biography ==
Zamana was born in Ombysh Village, Borzna Raion, Chernihiv Oblast on 3 December 1959. He graduated from the Kharkiv Guards Higher Tank Command School in 1982 and began a career as an officer - as a tank platoon commander within the Group of Soviet Forces in Germany. Between 1985 and 1990 he rose through the titles of Company Commanding Officer, Executive Officer of a Tank Battalion, and Tank Battalion Commander in East Germany and later Turkmenistan. He graduated from Marshal Rodion Malinovsky Military Armored Forces Academy in 1993 and was appointed Chief of Staff - Deputy Commander of an Odesa Military Command tank regiment.

Zamana graduated from the National University of Defense of Ukraine's Operational and Strategic Faculty in 2004. He was the Deputy Commander of the 8th Army Corps of Land Forces between 2004 and 2005 and was the Commander of the 6th Army Corps between 2005 and 2007.

Between 2007 and 2009, he was promoted to Chief of Territorial Administration of the Western Operations Command. In 2009 and 2010, he was Deputy Commander for Combat Training - Chief of the Main Directorate for Combat Training and between 2010 and 2011 Chief of Staff, First Deputy Commander of Land Forces.

Between August 2011 and February 2012 he served as the First Deputy Chief of the General Staff of the Ukraine Armed Forces, becoming Chief of the General Staff on 18 February 2012.

At the height of the February 2014 Euromaidan riots, President Victor Yanukovych (who had earlier promoted Zamana to Chief of the General Staff) sacked Zamana, replacing him with Admiral Yuriy Ilyin on 19 February 2014. On 22 February 2014 the Ukrainian Parliament voted to install Zamana as the Ukrainian Parliamentary Commissioner for the control of the Ministry of Defense of Ukraine as the Minister of Defense Pavlo Lebedyev fled to Crimea. When the Second Azarov Government was replaced with the Yatsenyuk Government Lebediev was replaced with Admiral Ihor Tenyukh.

On 25 February 2019 Zamana was detained on charges of high treason. The Ukrainian military prosecutor's office claimed that because he had, while in office, disbanded anti-aircraft missile divisions and military air force units he had deprived Ukraine of its air defense system.

Zamana took part in the July 2019 Ukrainian parliamentary election for the party Strength and Honor. But in the election the party won 3.82%, not enough to clear the 5% election threshold and thus no parliamentary seats.

== See also ==
- Chief of the General Staff (Ukraine)
- February 2014 Euromaidan riots

Military offices
Preceded by Hryhoriy Pedchenko	Chief of the General Staff; 2012–2014	Succeeded by Yuriy Ilyin
Preceded by Yuri Boryskin	Commander of the 6th Army Corps; 2005–2007	Succeeded by Serhiy Bessarab
