= Korniychuk =

Korniychuk (Ukrainian: Корнійчук) is a Ukrainian surname. Notable people with the surname include:

- Oleksandr Korniychuk (1905–1972), Ukrainian playwright, literary critic, and state official
- Serhiy Korniychuk (born 1965), Ukrainian army officer
- Yevgen Korniychuk (born 1966), Ukrainian politician and diplomat
