= Commander-in-Chief of the Armed Forces of Ukraine =

Leader of the Ukrainian military

- Головнокомандувач Збройних сил України (Ukrainian)
- Sleeve patch of the CiC

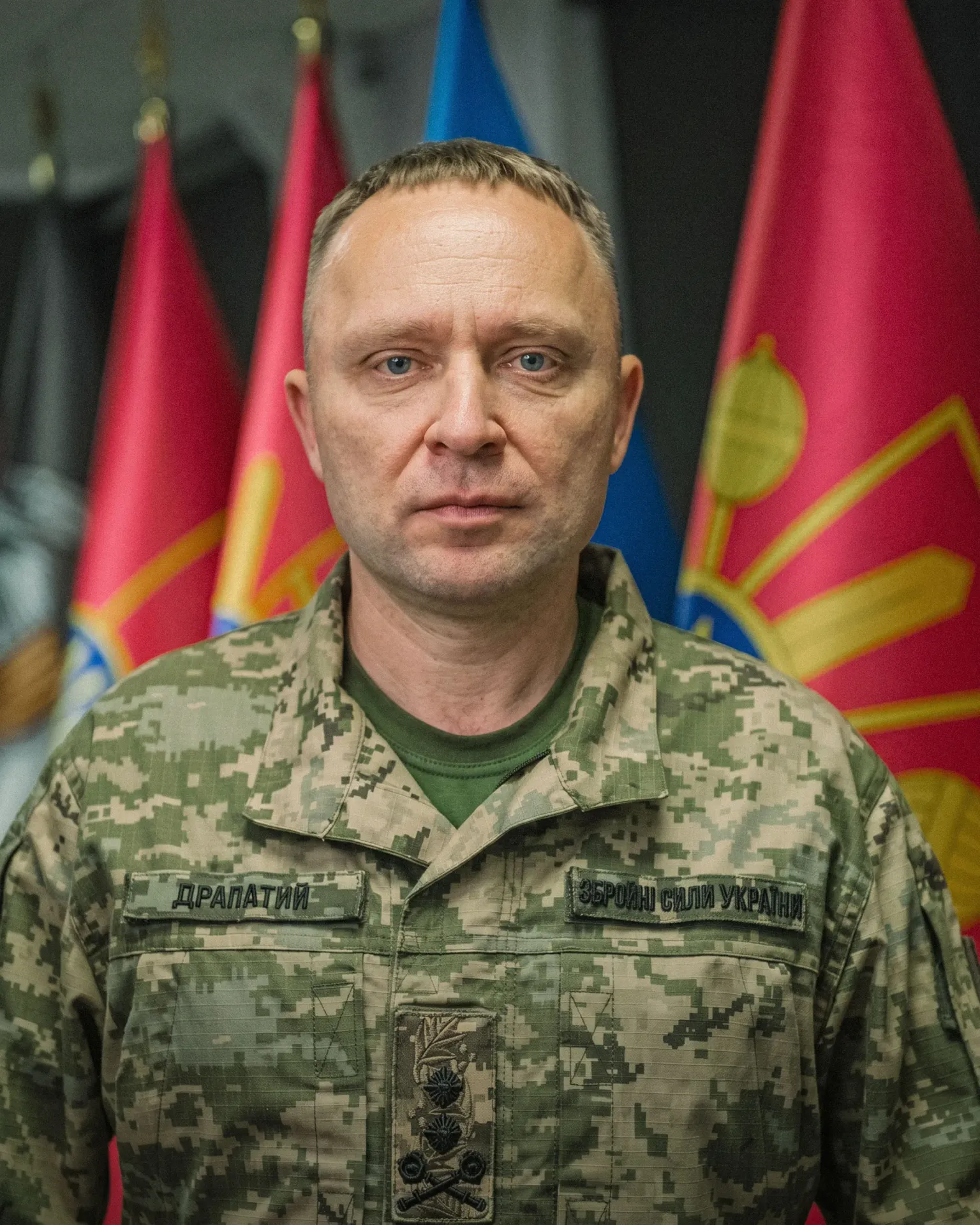
- Incumbent; General Mykhailo Drapatyi since 21 July 2026
- Ministry of Defence
- Type: Chief of Defence
- Abbreviation: HZSU
- Member of: National Security and Defense Council; Headquarters of the Supreme Commander-in-Chief
- Reports to: Minister of Defence
- Residence: Kyiv
- Nominator: Minister of Defence
- Appointer: President of Ukraine
- Precursor: Chief of the General Staff
- Formation: 28 March 2020; 6 years ago
- First holder: Ruslan Khomchak
- Deputy: Deputy commander-in-chief
- Website: Official website

The commander-in-chief of the Armed Forces of Ukraine (Ukrainian: Головнокомандувач Збройних сил України, romanized: Holovnokomanduvach Zbroinykh syl Ukrayiny) is the professional head of the Armed Forces of Ukraine. The position was created by President Volodymyr Zelenskyy on 28 March 2020, before which the chief of the General Staff was the commander-in-chief.

== Role ==
The commander-in-chief for Armed Forces of Ukraine directs the Armed Forces of Ukraine, monitors the state of the army with military equipment, weapons, and other resources, reports to the president and the minister of defense on achieving military-strategic goals in defense.

The Law of Ukraine "On the Armed Forces of Ukraine" also stipulates that direct military leadership is an activity aimed at implementing measures for the development of the Armed Forces of Ukraine, their technical equipment, training, and comprehensive support, and determining the basis of their application and management.

== History ==
The terminology was first used to describe the President of Ukraine as head of the armed forces. In 1993, the title was supplemented with the text "Supreme". Until 2005, Ministers of Defense of Ukraine who served as commissioned military officer or Chiefs of the General Staff of the Armed Forces of Ukraine (if the minister is a civilian) invariably held the title of Commanders-in-Chief of the Armed Forces. On June 16, 2005, the title became permanently linked to the Chief of the General Staff with the reappointment of General of the Army Serhiy Kyrychenko. Until 27 March 2020, in accordance with Art. 8 of the Law of Ukraine "On the Armed Forces of Ukraine", the Chief of the General Staff was the Commander-in-Chief of the Armed Forces of Ukraine. On 5 March 2022, then Commander-in-Chief of the Armed Forces of Ukraine, Lieutenant General Valerii Zaluzhnyi, was promoted to the rank of General by the President of Ukraine, Volodymyr Zelenskyy.

== Commander-in-Chief list ==
No.	Portrait	Name	Took office	Left office	Time in office	Defence branch	Ref.
1	Ruslan Khomchak	Colonel general Ruslan Khomchak (born 1967)	28 March 2020	27 July 2021	1 year, 121 days	Ukrainian Ground Forces	
2	Valerii Zaluzhnyi	General; Valerii Zaluzhnyi (born 1973)	27 July 2021	8 February 2024	2 years, 196 days	Ukrainian Ground Forces	
3	Oleksandr Syrskyi	General; Oleksandr Syrskyi (born 1965)	8 February 2024	21 July 2026	2 years, 211 days	Ukrainian Ground Forces	
4	Mykhailo Drapatyi	Major general Mykhailo Drapatyi (born 1982)	21 July 2026	Incumbent	47 days	Ukrainian Ground Forces	

== Deputy Commander-in-Chief ==
No.	Portrait	Name	Took office	Left office	Time in office	Defence branch	Ref.
1	Yevhen Moisiuk	Lieutenant general Yevhen Moisiuk (born 1979)	29 July 2021	11 February 2024	2 years, 197 days	Ukrainian Air Assault Forces	
