= Chief of the General Staff (Ukraine) =

Head of the General Staff of the Ukrainian Armed Forces

- Начальник Генерального штабу
- Sleeve patch of the General Staff

- Ensign of the Chief of the General Staff

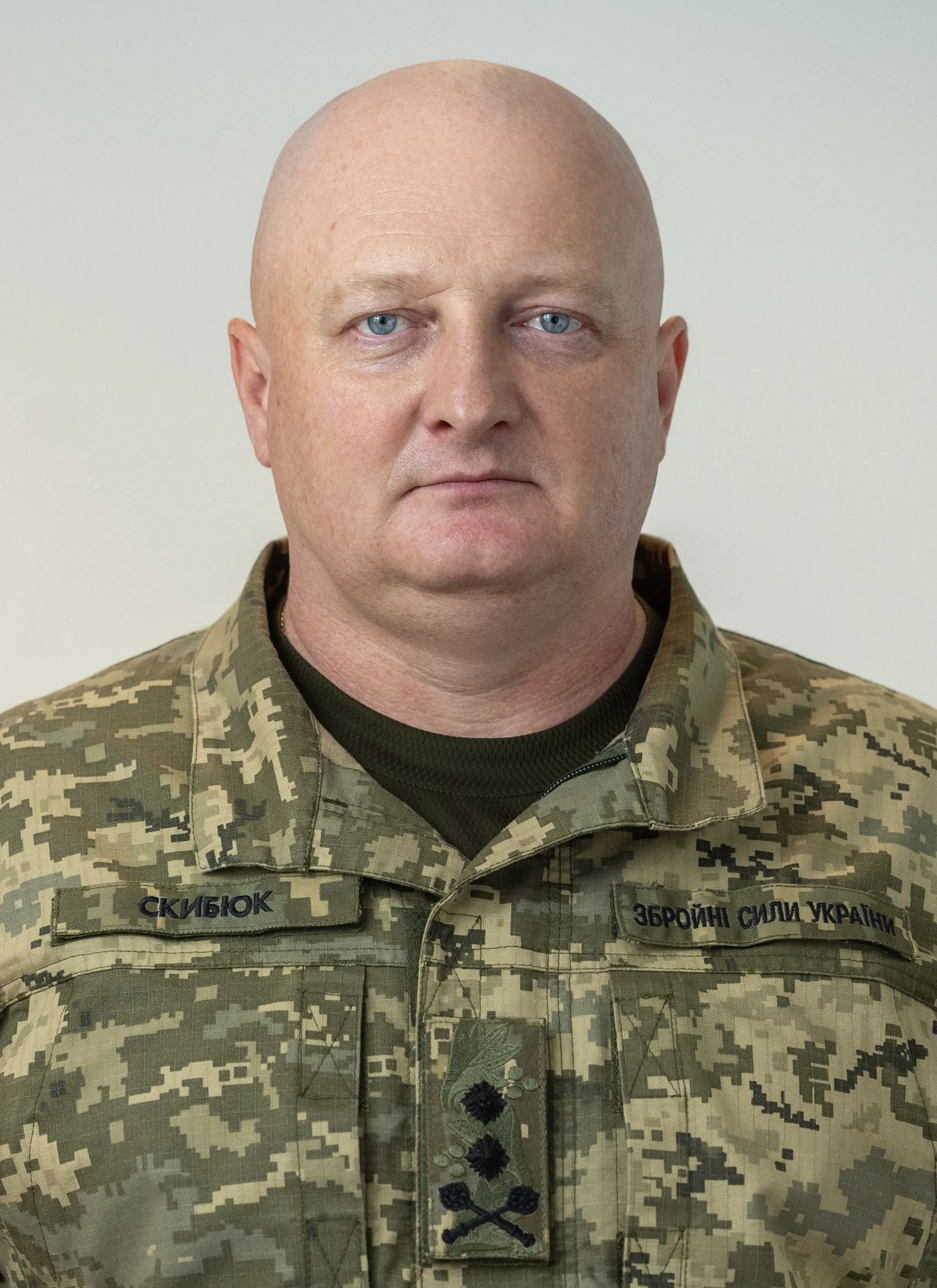
- Incumbent; Major General Ihor Skybiuk since 22 July 2026
- Member of: the General Staff
- Reports to: Commander-in-Chief of the Armed Forces
- Residence: Kyiv
- Nominator: Minister of Defence
- Appointer: President of Ukraine
- Formation: April 1918 (historical); 23 December 1991 (current)
- First holder: Colonel Oleksandr Slyvynsky

The chief of the General Staff (Ukrainian: Начальник Генерального штабу, romanized: Nachalnyk Heneralnoho shtabu, abbr. Ukrainian: НГШ, romanized: NHSh), or CGS, is the head of the General Staff of the Ukrainian Armed Forces, the military staff of the Forces. He is appointed by the president of Ukraine.

Since a decree by President Volodymyr Zelenskyy on 28 March 2020, the posts of chief of the General Staff and commander-in-chief of the Armed Forces have been separate. Previously the Chief of the General Staff also served as the commander-in-chief when a civilian was the minister of defense (before 1 January 2019 it was not a requirement that the minister of defense be a civilian).

The current chief of the General Staff is Ihor Skybiuk.

== Chiefs of General Staff ==
=== Armed Forces of Ukraine ===
The office created upon the reorganization of the Soviet Kyiv Military District when its head, Colonel General Viktor Chechevatov, after receiving the offer to be appointed to the post, refused to pledge his allegiance to the Ukrainian people. Originally it was known as Chief of the Headquarters and was designated as the First Deputy of the Minister of Defense. In 1996 it was changed to Chief of the General Staff. In 2002 as part of military reform, the post was separated from the civil service and lost its ministerial deputy functions. In 2005 Chief of the General Staff was reaffirmed as the primary commander of the Armed Forces in the country and was granted a parallel post of Commander-in-Chief. In 2020 another reorganization took place as part of ongoing military reform triggered by the Russian aggression and the post of Commander-in-Chief was split into a separate post.

No.	Portrait	Chief of the General Staff	Took office	Left office	Time in office	Defence branch	Ref.
–	Georgiy Zhyvytsia	Lieutenant General; Georgiy Zhyvytsia (1937–2015); Acting	23 December 1991	4 June 1992	164 days	Ukrainian Ground Forces	
1	Vasyl Sobkov	Lieutenant General; Vasyl Sobkov (1944–2020)	4 June 1992	25 September 1992	113 days	Ukrainian Ground Forces	.
–	Ivan Bizhan	Lieutenant General; Ivan Bizhan (born 1941); Acting	25 September 1992	24 March 1993	180 days	Ukrainian Ground Forces	.
2	Anatoliy Lopata [uk]	Colonel General; Anatoliy Lopata (born 1940)	24 March 1993	10 February 1996	2 years, 323 days	Ukrainian Ground Forces	
3	Oleksandr Zatynaiko	Colonel General; Oleksandr Zatynaiko (born 1949)	12 March 1996	30 September 1998	2 years, 202 days	Ukrainian Ground Forces	
4	Volodymyr Shkidchenko	General of Army of Ukraine; Volodymyr Shkidchenko (born 1948)	1 October 1998	13 November 2001	3 years, 43 days	Ukrainian Ground Forces	
–	Mykola Palchuk [uk]	Lieutenant General; Mykola Palchuk (1945–2016); Acting	13 November 2001	27 November 2001	14 days	Ukrainian Ground Forces	.
5	Petro Shulyak	Colonel General; Petro Shulyak (born 1945)	27 November 2001	28 July 2002	223 days	Ukrainian Ground Forces	
(3)	Oleksandr Zatynaiko	Colonel General; Oleksandr Zatynaiko (born 1949)	13 August 2002	3 June 2004	1 year, 295 days	Ukrainian Ground Forces	
6	Serhiy Kyrychenko	General of Army of Ukraine; Serhiy Kyrychenko (born 1952)	19 July 2004	18 November 2009 (Note: Tendered resignation in early October.)	7 years, 122 days	Ukrainian Ground Forces	
7	Ivan Svyda	Colonel General; Ivan Svyda (born 1950)	18 November 2009	31 May 2010 (Note: Submitted a letter of resignation on 29 May 2010.)	194 days	Ukrainian Ground Forces	
8	Hryhoriy Pedchenko	Colonel General; Hryhoriy Pedchenko (born 1955)	31 May 2010	18 February 2012	1 year, 263 days	Ukrainian Ground Forces	
9	Volodymyr Zamana	Lieutenant General; Volodymyr Zamana (born 1959)	18 February 2012	19 February 2014	2 years, 1 day	Ukrainian Ground Forces	
10	Yuriy Ilyin	Admiral; Yuriy Ilyin (born 1962)	19 February 2014	28 February 2014	9 days	Ukrainian Navy	
11	Mykhailo Kutsyn	Lieutenant General; Mykhailo Kutsyn (born 1957)	28 February 2014	3 July 2014	125 days	Ukrainian Ground Forces	
12	Viktor Muzhenko	General of the Army of Ukraine; Viktor Muzhenko (born 1961)	3 July 2014	21 May 2019	4 years, 322 days	Ukrainian Ground Forces	
13	Ruslan Khomchak	Lieutenant General; Ruslan Khomchak (born 1967)	21 May 2019	28 March 2020	312 days	Ukrainian Ground Forces	
14	Serhiy Korniychuk	Lieutenant General; Serhiy Korniychuk (born 1965)	28 March 2020	28 July 2021	1 year, 122 days	Ukrainian Ground Forces	
15	Serhiy Shaptala	Lieutenant General; Serhiy Shaptala (born 1973)	28 July 2021	9 February 2024	2 years, 196 days	Ukrainian Ground Forces	
16	Anatoliy Barhylevych	Lieutenant General; Anatoliy Barhylevych (born 1969)	9 February 2024	16 March 2025	1 year, 35 days	Ukrainian Ground Forces	
17	Andrii Hnatov	Major General; Andrii Hnatov	16 March 2025	22 July 2026	1 year, 128 days	Ukrainian Marine Corps	
18	Ihor Skybiuk	Major General; Ihor Skybiuk (born 1976)	22 July 2026	Incumbent	122 days	Air Assault Forces	

== Historical offices ==
=== Ukrainian People's Republic ===
Ukrainian General Staff

No.	Portrait	Chief of the Ukrainian General Staff	Took office	Left office	Time in office
1	Borys Bobrovsky [uk]	Major General; Borys Bobrovsky (1868–1933)	November 1917	March 1918	4 months
2	Oleksandr Slyvynsky [uk]	Colonel; Oleksandr Slyvynsky (1886–1956)	8 February 1918	12 February 1918	4 days
3	Oleksander Osetsky	Ensign general Oleksander Osetsky (1873–1937)	12 February 1918	August 1919	4 months

Headquarters of the UPR

No.	Portrait	Chief of the Headquarters of the UPR	Took office	Left office	Time in office
1	Vasyl Tyutyunnyk [uk]	Ensign general Vasyl Tyutyunnyk (1890–1919)	1919	8 September 1919	8 days
2	Volodymyr Sinclair	Colonel; Volodymyr Sinclair (1887–1919)	8 September 1919	26 September 1919	18 days

General Staff of UPR

No.	Portrait	Chief of the General Staff of UPR	Took office	Left office	Time in office
1	Volodymyr Sinclair	Colonel; Volodymyr Sinclair (1887–1919)	28 October 1918	19 August 1921	2 years, 295 days
2	Vsevolod Petriv	Colonel; Vsevolod Petriv (1883–1948)	19 August 1921	June 1922	8 days

=== West Ukrainian National Republic ===
Ukrainian Galician Army

No.	Portrait	Supreme Commander of the Ukrainian Galician Army	Took office	Left office	Time in office
1	Dmytro Vitovsky	Colonel; Dmytro Vitovsky (1887–1919)	28 October 1918	5 November 1918	8 days
2	Hryhoriy Kossak	Colonel; Hryhoriy Kossak (1882–1939)	5 November 1918	9 November 1918	4 days
3	Hnat Stefaniv	Colonel; Hnat Stefaniv (1895–1949)	9 November 1918	10 December 1918	31 days
4	Mykhailo Omelianovych-Pavlenko	General; Mykhailo Omelianovych-Pavlenko (1878–1952)	10 December 1918	9 June 1919	181 days
5	Oleksandr Hrekov	General; Oleksandr Hrekov (1875–1958)	9 June 1919	5 July 1919	26 days
6	Myron Tarnavsky	General; Myron Tarnavsky (1869–1938)	5 July 1919	7 November 1919	125 days
7	Osyp Mykytka	General; Osyp Mykytka (1871–1920)	7 November 1919	12 February 1920	97 days

General Bulawa

General Bulawa was a name of the General Staff of Ukraine in 1917–1920.

No.	Portrait	Chief of the General Bulawa	Took office	Left office	Time in office
1	Mykola Marynovych [uk]	Colonel; Mykola Marynovych (1861–1944)	1 November 1918	5 November 1918	4 days
2	Semen Goruk	Major; Semen Goruk (1873–1920)	6 November 1918	10 December 1918	35 days
3	Yevhen Myshkovskyi [uk]	Ensign general Yevhen Myshkovskyi (1882–1920)	10 December 1918	7 February 1919	58 days
4	Viktor Kurmanovych	General; Viktor Kurmanovych (1876–1945)	8 February 1919	6 June 1919	118 days
5	Karl Stipsitz-Tarnawa [uk]	Colonel; Karl Stipsitz-Tarnawa (1883–1954)	8 June 1919	5 July 1919	27 days
6	Alfred Shamanek [uk]	Colonel; Alfred Shamanek (1883–1920)	5 July 1919	7 November 1919	125 days
7	Gustav Ziritz [uk]	Major general Gustav Ziritz (1872–1920)	8 November 1919	10 February 1920	94 days
