= Heorhiy Zhyvytsia =

Heorhiy Volodymyrovych Zhyvytsia (Ukrainian: Георгій Володимирович Живиця; July 1, 1937 - December 26, 2015) was a Ukrainian Lieutenant General who served as acting Chief of the Main Staff of the Armed Forces of Ukraine from December 1991 to June 1992.

He was born on July 1, 1937 in Tbilisi, Georgian SSR. In 1962, he graduated from the Leningrad Artillery School, the Frunze Military Academy (1974), and the Military Academy of the General Staff (1978). He commissioned in the Soviet Army in 1962, serving for 29 years, having served in the Northern Group of Forces, the Soviet General Staff and the Carpathian Military District. From June 1990, he served as 50th Center for Operational-Strategic Research of the General Staff, and from December 1991 he was on assignment in the Cabinet of Ministers of Ukraine. On December 23, 1991 he was appointed to the position of First Deputy Chief of the General Staff as well as to Acting Chief of the General Staff. He served until 4 June 1992, being replaced by Vasyl Sobkov. In August 1993, he was discharged from the ranks of the Armed Forces of Ukraine and placed in the reserve.

He was married to the poetess Hanna Chubach (1942–2019) since 1992. He died on December 26, 2015. He is buried at the Baikove Cemetery with his wife.

== Awards and honors ==
- Order of Bohdan Khmelnytsky, 2nd class (June 22, 2007)
- Order of the Red Star
- Order "For Service to the Homeland in the Armed Forces of the USSR" 3rd class
