= Ivan Svyda =

Ukrainian general (born 1950)

- Іван Свида
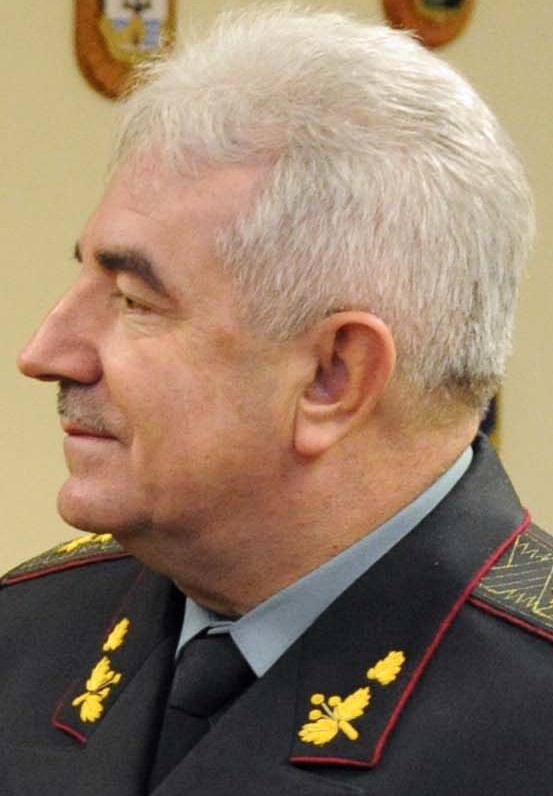
- Svyda in 2008

7th Chief of the General Staff
- In office 18 November 2009 – 31 May 2010
- President: Viktor Yushchenko; Viktor Yanukovych
- Preceded by: Serhiy Kyrychenko
- Succeeded by: Hryhoriy Pedchenko

Personal details
- Born: 15 February 1950 (age 76) Patskanovo, Uzhhorod Raion, Ukrainian SSR, Soviet Union

Military service
- Allegiance: Soviet Union (until 1991); Ukraine
- Branch/service: Soviet Army; Ukrainian Ground Forces
- Rank: General of Army of Ukraine

Ivan Yuriyovych Svyda (Ukrainian: Іван Юрійович Свида; born 15 February 1950) is a Ukrainian military general who served as Chief of General Staff from 2009 to 2010. He submitted his letter of resignation from the military on 29 May 2010.

== Biography ==
He was born on 15 February 1950, in the village of Patskanovo, Uzhhorod Raion, Zakarpattia Oblast.

In 1971, he graduated from Uzhhorod State University.

In 1972, he was appointed commander of a motorized rifle platoon of the Carpathian Military District.

From 1974 to 1977, he served as the commander of a motorized rifle company, chief of staff of a motorized rifle battalion, and commander of a motorized rifle battalion.

In 1975, he graduated from the Ordzhonikidziv higher military command school as an external student .

In 1980, he graduated from the Frunze Military Academy.

In 1980, he was appointed deputy commander of the motorized rifle regiment of the Transcaucasian Military District.

In 1992, he graduated from the Military Academy of the General Staff of the Russian Federation.

Since 1992 he has served in the ranks of the Armed Forces of Ukraine.

In 1992, he was appointed commander of the 17th Tank Division of the 6th Army Corps of the Odesa Military District. He was promoted to Major General on 21 August 1993.

From 1998 to 2005, he was the first deputy commander of the troops of the Southern Operational Command, Commander of the 32nd Army Corps of the Southern Operational Command of the Ukrainian Ground Forces. He was promoted to Lieutenant General on 23 August 1998.

In July 2005, he was appointed commander of the forces of the Southern Operational Command.

Since 25 June 2007, he has been the commander of the Ukrainian Ground Forces.

On 20 August 2008, he was awarded the military rank of colonel general.

By the decree of the President of Ukraine dated 18 November 2009, he was appointed to the post of Chief of the General Staff.

On 15 February 2010, he was awarded the military rank of General of the Army.

On 29 May 2010, he resigned, declaring that he recognized "the right of the president to implement his vision of the ways of development of the Armed Forces." "As an officer and a responsible person, I am ready to work in difficult conditions to strengthen the country's defense. In the current situation, I recognize the right of the President to realize his vision of the ways of development of the Armed Forces. He will do it with another Chief of the General Staff," says the report to the president. Ivan Svyda also expressed dissatisfaction with the financing of the Ukrainian Ground Forces by the Mykola Azarov cabinet.

== Awards ==
Order of Bohdan Khmelnytsky II degree (29 November 2005)

Military offices
Preceded by Serhiy Kirichenko	Chief of the General Staff; 2009–2010	Succeeded by Hryhoriy Pedchenko
Preceded by Valeriy Frolov	Commander of the Ground Forces; 2007–2009	Succeeded by Hennadiy Vorobyov
Preceded by Hryhoriy Pedchenko	Commander of the OC South; 2005–2007	Succeeded by Petro Lytvyn
