= Yuriy Ilyin =

Ukrainian admiral and former commander

- Юрій Іванович Ільїн
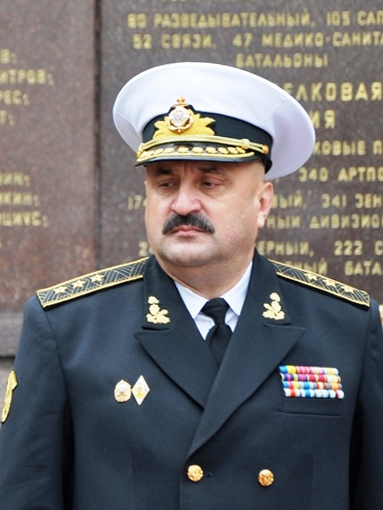
- Ilyin in 2013
- Born: Yuriy Ivanovych Ilyin; 21 August 1962 (age 64); Rahachow, Byelorussian SSR, Soviet Union
- Spouse(s): Married, one daughter.
- Military career
- Allegiance: Ukraine; Soviet Union
- Branch: Soviet Navy; Ukrainian Navy
- Service years: 1983–2014
- Rank: Admiral
- Commands: 1991-1993 Department of Coast Guard - Black Sea Fleet; 1998-2003 1st Detached Marine Brigade; 2003-2005 Deputy Chief/Chief of Defence Planning Department; 2005-2008 Senior Military Representative to USA; 2008-2012 Deputy Chief of Staff/Chief of Staff - First Deputy Commander Ukrainian Navy; 2012-2014 Ukrainian Navy Commander; 2014-2014 Chief of the General Staff

Yuriy Ivanovych Ilyin (Ukrainian: Юрій Іванович Ільїн; Belarusian: Юры Іванавіч Ільін, romanized: Jury Ivanavič Iljin ; Russian: Юрий Иванович Ильин, romanized: Juri Ivanovič Iljin; born 21 August 1962) is a Ukrainian admiral and former commander of the Ukrainian Navy. He was elevated to the position of Chief of the General Staff by President Viktor Yanukovych on 19 February 2014 after the existing chief, Colonel General Volodymyr Zamana, was dismissed by the President during the February 2014 Euromaidan riots.

After an admission to hospital following a heart attack on 27 February 2014, Ilyin was dismissed from the post of Chief of the General Staff by interim president Oleksandr Turchynov on 28 February 2014.

== Early life and career ==
Ilyin was born in Rohachow, Belarus. In 1979 he graduated from the Suvorov Military School in Minsk and subsequently entered the Frunze Higher Artillery Command Military School in Odesa.

Between 1983 and 1991 he served with the Black Sea Fleet as a platoon leader and battery commanding officer in the detached marine brigade. He then spent two years serving as an officer at the Coast Guard for the Black Sea Fleet.

== Command posts ==
By 1993 he had moved to the Ukrainian Navy Command HQ and served in this post for five years. In 1998 he assumed command of the 1st Detached Marine Brigade of the Ukrainian Navy, a position he held for five years. Between December 2003 and June 2005 he was the Deputy Chief of Ukrainian Navy Command and Chief of the Defence Planning Department in the Ukrainian Navy. From June 2005 to August 2008 he was a senior military representative of the Ukraine's armed forces in the United States. Between August 2008 and July 2012 he was the First Deputy Chief of Staff and Chief of Staff/First Deputy Commander of the Ukrainian Navy.

He graduated from the National Defence University in 2010. In 2010 he led a delegation of Ukrainian naval personnel during their visit to the United States Naval Amphibious Base in Coronado "to study the training of special operations units and Marine Corps of the US Navy".

Ilyin was appointed to the post of Ukrainian Navy Commander on 27 July 2012 and promoted to the rank of Admiral on 24 August 2013. He was then appointed Chief of the General Staff on 19 February 2014 after President Viktor Yanukovych dismissed the incumbent officeholder, Colonel General Volodymyr Zamana, at the height of the Euromaidan riots. Shortly after Yanukovych fled the presidential palace, Ilyin issued a statement claiming, "As an officer I see no other way than to serve the Ukrainian people honestly and assure that I have not and won't give any criminal orders". and defected from the Ukrainian Military.

Ilyin was reported to have been admitted to hospital after suffering a heart attack on 27 February 2014; he was subsequently dismissed as Chief of the General Staff by the interim President of Ukraine, Oleksandr Turchynov.

== Personal life ==
Ilyin is married and has one daughter.

== See also ==
- Chief of the General Staff (Ukraine)
- February 2014 Euromaidan riots

Military offices
| Preceded by | Commander of the 4th Marine Infantry Brigade; 1998–2003 | Succeeded by |
| Preceded by Viktor Maksymov | Naval Commander of Ukraine; 2012–2014 | Succeeded by Denis Berezovsky |
| Preceded by Volodymyr Zamana | Chief of the General Staff; 2014 | Succeeded by Mykhailo Kutsyn |
