= Ruslan Khomchak =

Ukrainian colonel general (born 1967)

- Руслан Борисович Хомчак
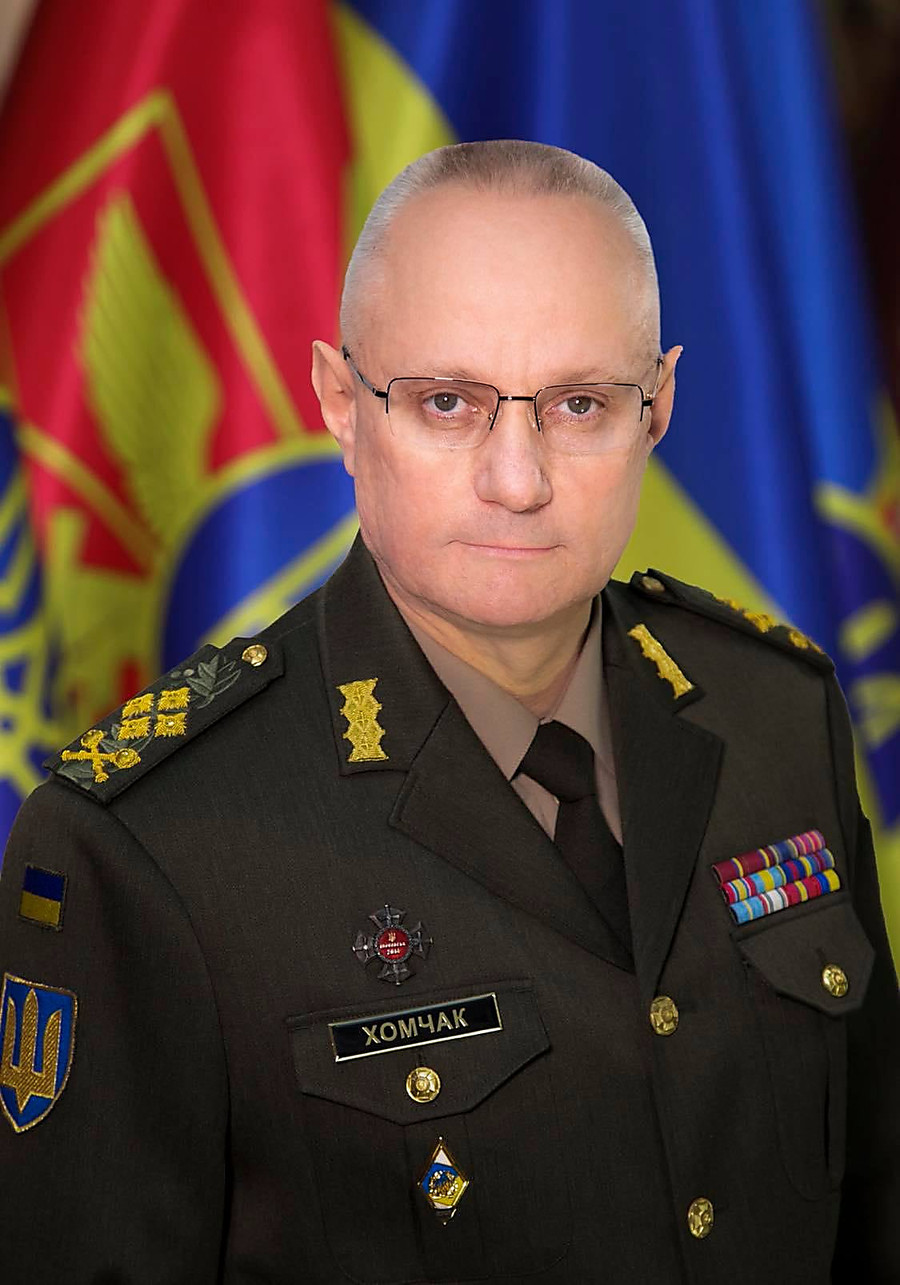
- Official portrait, 2021
- Born: Ruslan Borysovych Khomchak; 5 June 1967 (age 59); Lviv, Soviet Union
- Spouse: Anna Kovalenko
- Military career
- Allegiance: Soviet Union; Ukraine
- Branch: Soviet Army; Ukrainian Ground Forces
- Service years: 1988–present
- Rank: Colonel general
- Commands: Commander-in-Chief of the Armed Forces of Ukraine; Chief of the General Staff; Commander, Ukrainian Ground Forces; 92nd Mechanized Brigade (Ukraine)

Ruslan Borysovych Khomchak (Ukrainian: Русла́н Бори́сович Хомча́к; born 5 June 1967) is a Ukrainian Colonel-general who serves as the First Deputy Secretary of the National Security and Defense Council of Ukraine and former Commander-in-Chief of the Armed Forces of Ukraine, until 28 March 2020 also holding the post of Chief of the General Staff.

Previously from 21 May 2019, he combined this post of Commander-in-Chief of the Armed Forces of Ukraine with the post of Chief of the General Staff. On 28 March 2020, a decree by President Volodymyr Zelenskyy divided the posts of Commander in Chief and Chief of General Staff. On this day Zelenskyy dismissed Khomchak from the post of Chief of General Staff and appointed him Chief Commander of Armed Forces while simultaneously he appointed Serhiy Korniychuk Chief of the General Staff.

On July 27, 2021, Ruslan Khomchak was dismissed from the position of Commander-in-Chief of the Armed Forces of Ukraine and appointed as the First Deputy Secretary of the National Security and Defense Council of Ukraine.

== Biography ==
Khomchak was born in Lviv on 5 June 1967. He graduated from the Moscow Higher Military Command School in 1988 and served in the Soviet Artillery Corps, primarily in a self-propelled artillery unit fielding the 2S3 Akatsiya. Khomchak served in East Germany, in the Uzbek SSR and in the Belarusian SSR between 1988 and 1992.

Following Ukrainian independence in 1991 Khomchak became a military commander of the Armed Forces of Ukraine. From 1993 to 2000 Khomchak served in the 24th Mechanized Brigade. He was promoted to the rank of lieutenant-general in 2013. Khomchak participated in some of the most consequential battles during the war in Donbas. He was sectoral commander of Ukrainian forces during the Battle of Ilovaisk, in which Ukrainian units were surrounded and decisively defeated by separatists and their Russian backers. Reflecting on the battle several years later, Khomchak's predecessor as Commander-in-Chief, Viktor Muzhenko, suggested that the incompetence of Ukrainian commanders, and the large number of Russian troops fighting for the separatists, were largely to blame for the disastrous outcome.

On 21 May 2019, President of Ukraine Volodymyr Zelenskyy appointed Ruslan Khomchak Chief of the General Staff and Commander-in-Chief of the Armed Forces of Ukraine. On 28 March 2020 a decree by President Zelenskyy divided the posts of Commander in Chief and Chief of General Staff. On this day Zelenskyy dismissed Khomchak from the post of Chief of General Staff and appointed him Chief Commander of Armed Forces while simultaneously he appointed Serhiy Korniychuk Chief of the General Staff.

On 10 September 2020, Khomchak tested positive for COVID-19.

== Family ==
Khomchak is married to Anna Kovalenko. Kovalenko is a civic activist, journalist, active Euromaidan participant, former adviser to the three Ministers of Defense of Ukraine and a Minister of Information Policy of Ukraine. She was Head of the Chernihiv Regional State Administration from 13 October 2020 until 4 August 2021.

In January 2021 Kovalenko gave birth to the couple's daughter Maria.
