= Ihor Tenyukh =

Ukrainian admiral and politician

- Ігор Тенюх
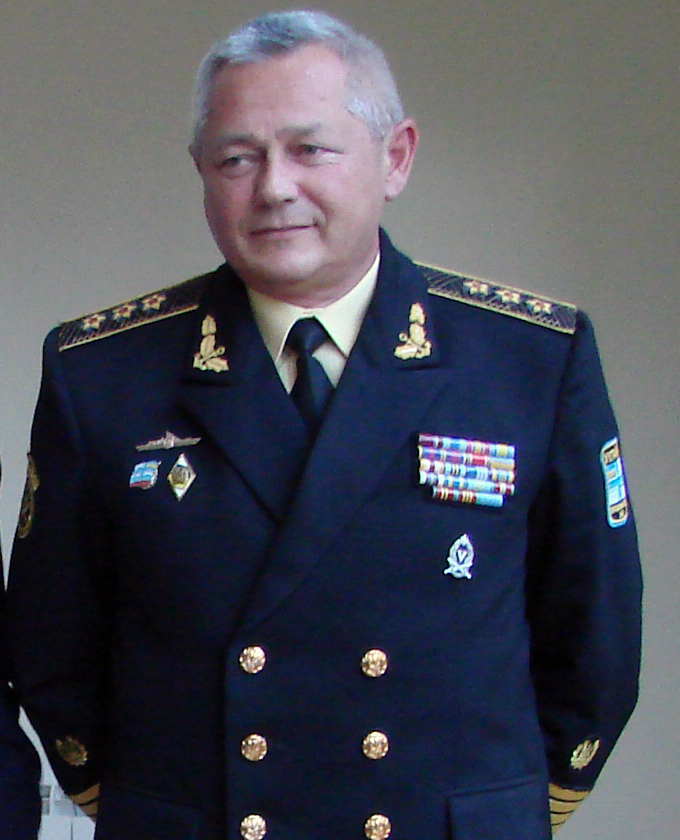
- Tenyukh in 2007

Minister of Defence
- In office 27 February 2014 – 25 March 2014
- Preceded by: Pavlo Lebedyev
- Succeeded by: Mykhailo Koval

Personal details
- Born: 23 May 1958 (age 68) Stryi, Ukrainian SSR, Soviet Union
- Party: All-Ukrainian Union Svoboda

Military service
- Allegiance: Soviet Union (1979–1991); Ukraine (1991–2010)
- Branch/service: Soviet Navy; Ukrainian Navy
- Years of service: 1979–2010
- Rank: Admiral
- Unit: Submarine Warfare

Ihor Yosypovych Tenyukh (Ukrainian: Ігор Йосипович Тенюх; born 23 May 1958) is a former Ukrainian admiral and Svoboda party member. He was the commander of the Ukrainian Navy from 2006 until 2010 when dismissed by Viktor Yanukovych. Tenyukh fully supported the 2013–2014 uprising, and was appointed Minister of Defense of Ukraine in February 2014. After and because of accusations of indecision in the face of the Russian invasion of Crimea, he resigned on 25 March 2014.

== Biography ==
Tenyukh graduated from the Frunze Higher Naval School, Leningrad in 1979 and began his career as a torpedo boat officer.. In 1982 he underwent submarine training and became an officer of the submarine branch, mainly working in Kilo-class submarines. From 1983 to 1991, he rose through the ranks of commander of coastal mine-sweeper, executive officer of, then commander of seagoing mine-sweeper, chief of the armament and equipment stores department on a mine and anti-submarine armament base. He was for a time attached to training and advising the Indian Navy and the Algerian Navy as a liaison officer. In 1991 he became a member of the Defense and State Security Commission of the Verkhovna Rada (Ukrainian parliament), and participated in the development of a bill on the creation of the Armed Forces of Ukraine.

From 1991 to 1995, he was a senior officer of maintenance of combat actions Department of the Navy of Ministry of Defence of Ukraine, chief of command of the Navy of the Main Staff of the Armed forces of Ukraine, chief of department of directions of the Main operational agency of General Staff of the Ukrainian Armed Forces. In 1994, he graduated from the U.S. Defense Language Institute, and in 1997 he became a faculty member at National Academy of the Armed Forces of Ukraine to prepare officers on an operational-strategic level. From 1997 to 2005, he was a commander of 1st Surface Ships Brigade and commander of combined arms squadron of the Ukrainian Naval Forces. In 2002, he was commander of the annual activation of the Black Sea Force BLACKSEAFOR.

From November 2005 – 2006 he was deputy chief of staff of the Armed Forces of Ukraine. Pursuant to decree #252/2006 dated 23 March 2006 the Ukrainian president promoted him from rear admiral to commander-in-chief of the Navy of Ukraine. On 22 August 2008, Tenyukh was promoted from Vice Admiral to the rank of Admiral.

On 25 March 2014, acting President Oleksandr Turchynov dismissed Tenyukh from his position after he was criticized for withdrawing from Crimea too slowly during the Russian annexation.

=== Politics ===
Tenyukh is a member of the right-wing All-Ukrainian Union "Freedom" party, better known as Svoboda.

== Euromaidan and annexation of Crimea ==
During the Euromaidan rally in Kyiv on 19 January 2014 Tenyukh warned of the dangers posed by the "coup d'etat planned by the current authorities" and called for members of the Armed Forces to defy "illegal" orders from those in power. He was quoted as saying "Tomorrow the regime will enslave you too. Therefore we are calling on you to fulfill your military oath of loyalty to the Ukrainian people, and not to the authorities who have gone off the rails". Tenyukh was appointed on 27 February 2014 by the Verkhovna Rada of Ukraine Minister of Defense. Due to his indecisiveness during the annexation of Crimea, he submitted his resignation to the Ukrainian parliament on 25 March which accepted it with 228 votes.

== Awards ==
Tenyukh has been awarded with orders, medals and departmental rewards.

- Order of Merit (Ukraine)
- Medal For Military Service to Ukraine
- Commendation For Merits
- Jubilee Medal "70 Years of the Armed Forces of the USSR"
- Medal "For Impeccable Service"

Military offices
Preceded by Ihor Knyaz	Naval Commander of Ukraine; 2006–2010	Succeeded by Viktor Maksymov
Political offices
Preceded by Pavlo Lebedyev	Minister of Defense acting 2014	Succeeded by Myhailo Koval
