= Anatoliy Barhylevych =

Ukrainian military officer (born 1969)

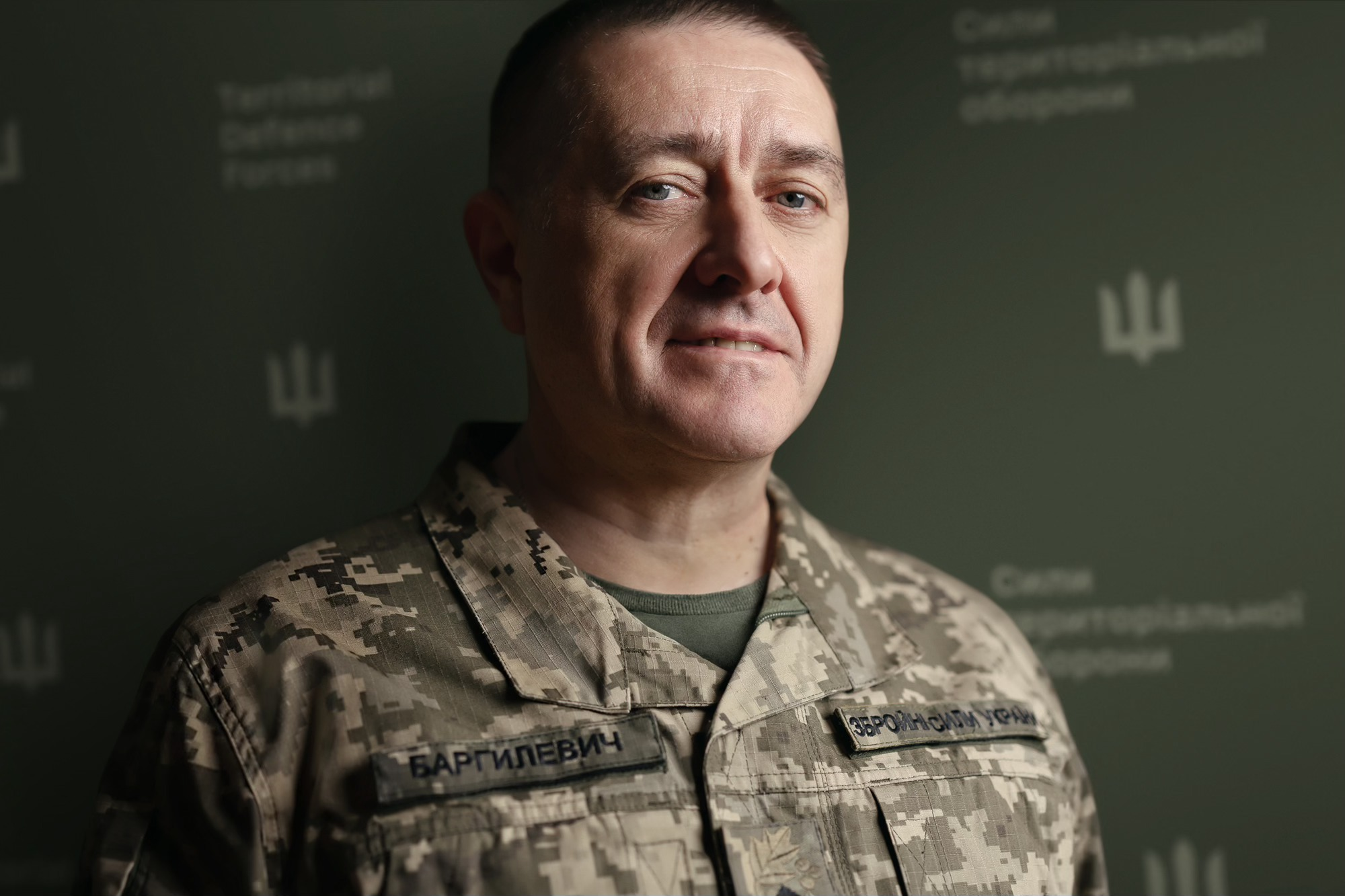
- Barhylevych in 2023
- Born: 8 April 1969 (age 57); Omelianivka, Korosten Raion, Zhytomyr Oblast, Ukrainian SSR, Soviet Union
- Education: Chirchiq Higher Tank Command and Engineering School; National Defense University of Ukraine
- Children: 2
- Military career
- Allegiance: Soviet Union (to 1991); Ukraine
- Branch: Soviet Army; Ukrainian Ground Forces
- Service years: 1987–present
- Rank: Lieutenant General
- Commands: Chief Inspector of the Ministry of Defense; Chief of the General Staff; Territorial Defense Forces
- Conflicts: Russo-Ukrainian war; 2022 Russian invasion of Ukraine

Anatoliy Vladyslavovych Barhylevych (Ukrainian: Анатолій Владиславович Баргилевич; born 8 April 1969) is a Ukrainian Lieutenant General (2024), commander of the Territorial Defense Forces from 9 October 2023, until 9 February 2024, when he became Chief of the General Staff of the Armed Forces of Ukraine until 16 March 2025.

== Biography ==
He has been serving in the military since 1987. He graduated from the Tashkent Higher Tank Command School.

In 2014, at the beginning of the war in eastern Ukraine, he served as Head of the Operational Training Directorate of the Main Operations Directorate of the General Staff of the Armed Forces of Ukraine. He later served at the headquarters of the Anti-Terrorist Operation.

Since 2016, he served as Head of the Operations Directorate and Deputy Chief of Staff of the Ground Forces Command. He was promoted to Major general on 23 August 2017.

From 2020 to 2022, he served as Deputy Commander of the Ground Forces and Commander of the Territorial Defence Command of Ukraine. From 2022, he served as Chief of Staff of the Khortytsia Operational-Strategic Grouping of Troops.

On 9 October 2023, he was appointed Commander of the Territorial Defense Forces of the Armed Forces of Ukraine. He halted a number of reforms that had been initiated after 2022, including dissolving a unit responsible for this area of work.

On 10 February 2024, he was appointed Chief of the General Staff of the Armed Forces of Ukraine.

He was promoted to Lieutenant general on 23 August 2024.

On 16 March 2025 he was appointed Chief Inspector of the Ministry of Defence of Ukraine by decree of President Volodymyr Zelenskyy on the recommendation of then Defence Minister Rustem Umerov.
