= Vatutine, Kharkiv Oblast =

Village in Nova Vodolaha Raion, Kharkiv Oblast, Ukraine

Coordinates: 49°46′44″N 35°58′05″E

Vatutine (Ukrainian: Ватутіне) is a village in northeastern Ukraine, located in Kharkiv Raion, Kharkiv Oblast. It has a population of roughly 1,200 people.

== History ==
Vatutine was designated a rural-type settlement by the Kharkiv Oblast Council on 27 March 2009. In early 2019, the Kharkiv Commercial Court of Appeal, at the request of the regional prosecutor's office, returned 1/5 of the integral property complex of the former bread base No. 84, which was illegally privatized as it was on the list of objects not subject to privatization, to state ownership.

In February 2023, during the Russian invasion of Ukraine, it was decided that Vatutine would be renamed Zaluzhne, in honor of top Ukrainian general Valeriy Zaluzhnyi. The old name is set to be removed as part of decommunization and derussification, as it is derived from the surname of Nikolai Vatutin, a general for the Soviet Red Army. The new name must still undergo approval by the Ukrainian Institute of National Memory, and then the Verkhovna Rada, before it becomes official.
