= Hanna Chubach =

Ukrainian poet (1941–2019)

- Ганна Чубач
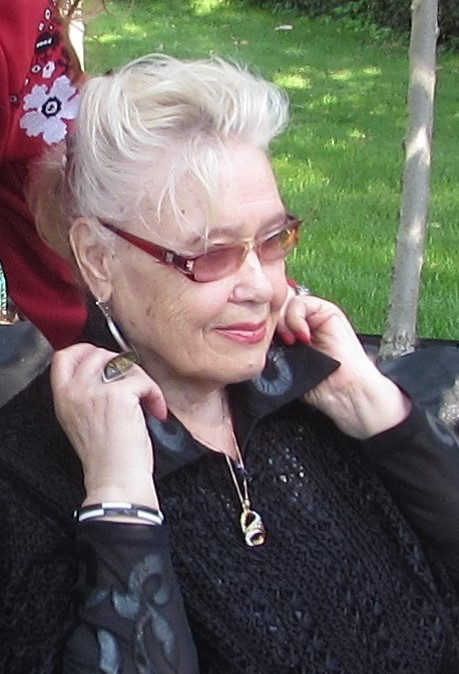
- Hanna Chubach in 2017
- Born: 6 January 1941; Ukrainian Soviet Socialist Republic (USSR) (present-day Ukraine)
- Died: 19 February 2019 (aged 78)
- Citizenship: Ukraine
- Education: Ukrainian Institute of Printing
- Occupations: poet, journalist
- Spouse: Heorhiy Zhyvytsia

Hanna Chubach (Ukrainian: Ганна Чубач; 6 January 1941 — 19 February 2019) was a Ukrainian poet and Honored Art Worker of Ukraine. From 1971, she was a Member of the National Writers' Union of Ukraine.

== Biography ==
Hanna Chubach was born in 1941 in Ploske village, Vinnytsya Oblast, Ukraine (then USSR).

After graduation from secondary and evening schools, in 1959, she moved with her husband to Kyiv, where she graduated from the Ukrainian Institute of Printing.

She worked as journalist in several paper media in 1970—80s. During that period, she started her career as a children literature author.

In 1997, during a trip to Washington, DC, for the World Conference on Literature of the Twenty-First Century, Chubach was elected an advisor to the Slavic peoples.

She gained the Lesia Ukrainka Prize in 2016.

Author of circa 60 books and more than 500 songs.

Hanna Chubach died in 2019.

== Sources ==
- Антонюк Є. Лірика Ганни Чубач // Дивослово. — 1995. — No. 7. — С. 43–45.
- Письменники України: Довідник. — Дніпропетровськ, 1996. — С. 329.
- Ганна Чубач: [біогр. письм.] // Розкажіть онуку. — 1999. — No. 6. — С. 30.
- Ганна Чубач: [біогр. письм.] // Дивосвіт «Веселки»: антол. л-ри для дітей та юнацтва: в 3 т. Т.3. — К., 2005. — С. 452.
- Кодлюк, Я. Ганна Чубач: [біогр. письм.] / Я. Кодлюк, Г. Одинцова // 120 розповідей про письменників. — К., 2006. — С. 163–164.
- Федоренко, Н. Журавка з подільського жита / Н. Федоренко // Дошк. вихов. — 1992. — No. 2-3. — С. 19.
- Апанович, Марія Миколаївна. Художнє втілення історіософського міфу в поетичній творчості Ганни Чубач: автореф. дис. канд. філол. наук : 10.01.01 / Апанович Марія Миколаївна; Київ. нац. ун-т ім. Тараса Шевченка. — К., 2013. — 20 с.
