= Mykola Lytvyn =

Ukrainian general

- Микола Михайлович Литвин
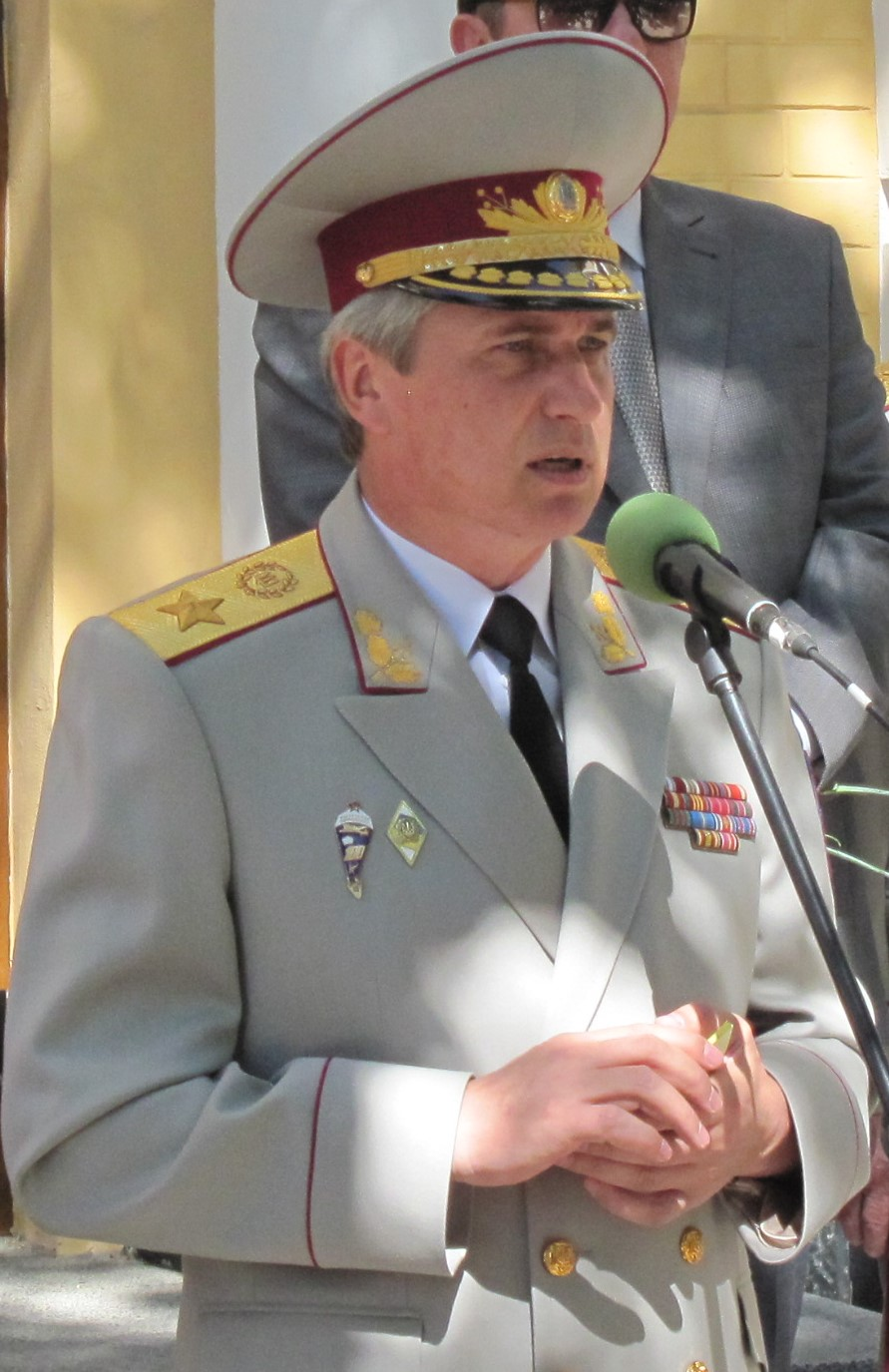
- Born: 8 March 1961 (age 65); Sloboda-Romanivska, Ukrainian SSR, Soviet Union
- Military career
- Allegiance: USSR; Ukraine
- Branch: Internal Troops of Ukraine; SBGS
- Service years: 1979–2014
- Rank: General of the Army
- Conflicts: Russo-Ukrainian War: War in Donbas

Mykola Mykhailovych Lytvyn (Ukrainian: Микола Михайлович Литвин; born 8 March 1961) was a chief of the State Border Guard Service of Ukraine since 2003, and then General of the Army of Ukraine in 2008. He resigned in 2014.

== Biography ==
Lytvyn was born on 8 March 1961, to a peasant family in the village of Sloboda-Romanivska in Novohrad-Volynskyi Raion (Zhytomyr Oblast).

Lytvyn started out his military career in the Group of Soviet Forces in Germany in 1979–1980. In 1980–84 he studied at the Higher Military Political College of Engineer Troops and Forces of Communication in Donetsk. In 1984–90 Lytvyn was stationed in the Transcaucasian Military District (Azerbaijan SSR) serving in the 104th Guards Airborne Division.

In 1990–93 Lytvyn was an audit student at the Lenin Military Political Academy in Moscow. After graduation he served in the National Guard of Ukraine in 1993–96. In 1996–2001 Lytvyn was a deputy commander of the Internal Troops of Ukraine. During that period he graduated from the National University of Defense of Ukraine (1998), finished a military course at the Harvard University (1997) and was promoted from Colonel to Lieutenant General of the Army (1999). Also, the National Guard of Ukraine was dissolved and mostly reintegrated back into the Internal Troops of Ukraine.

On 14 July 2001, Lytvyn was appointed the commander of the Internal Troops of Ukraine, yet in four months on 12 November 2001 he was appointed the chief of Border Troops, a state committee which in 2003 was transformed into an independent state service headed by Lytvyn. In 2008 Lytvyn was promoted to the General of Army of Ukraine.

On 6 October 2014, President of Ukraine Poroshenko dismissed the head of the State Border Service of Ukraine Mykola Lytvyn. This is stated in the decree of the President 757/2014 number of 6 October 2014. "Release Mykola Mykhailovych Lytvyn from the post of Head of the State Border Guard Service of Ukraine," – said in the decree.

== Personal life ==
Lytvyn is married and has a daughter. He also has two brothers who are high-ranking officials of Ukraine:

- Volodymyr Lytvyn, Ukrainian politician, former speaker of the Verkhovna Rada
- Petro Lytvyn, commander of the Southern Operation Command.

Military offices
Preceded by Borys Oleksiyenko	Commander of the Border Troops of Ukraine; 2001–2014	Succeeded by Viktor Nazarenko
Preceded by Volodymyr Povazhnyuk	Commander of the Internal Troops of Ukraine; 2001	Succeeded by Serhiy Popkov
