= Hryhoriy Pedchenko =

Ukrainian military officer (born 1955)

- Born: 3 January 1955 (age 70); Dorohynka, Fastiv Raion, Ukrainian SSR
- Allegiance: Ukraine
- Service / branch: Armed Forces of Ukraine
- Rank: Colonel general

Hryhoriy Mykhailovych Pedchenko (Ukrainian: Григорій Михайлович Педченко; born 3 January 1955) is a Ukrainian military officer who served as the Chief of General Staff and the Chief Commander of the Armed Forces of Ukraine.

Military offices
Preceded by Ivan Svyda	Chief of the General Staff; 2010–2012	Succeeded by Volodymyr Zamana
Preceded by Volodymyr Mozharovsky	Commander of the OC South; 2003–2005	Succeeded by Ivan Svyda
Preceded by Vyacheslav Zabolotnyi	Commander of the 8th Army Corps; 2000–2002	Succeeded by Anatoliy Pushnyakov
