= Mykhailo Koval =

Ukrainian general (born 1956)

- Михайло Коваль
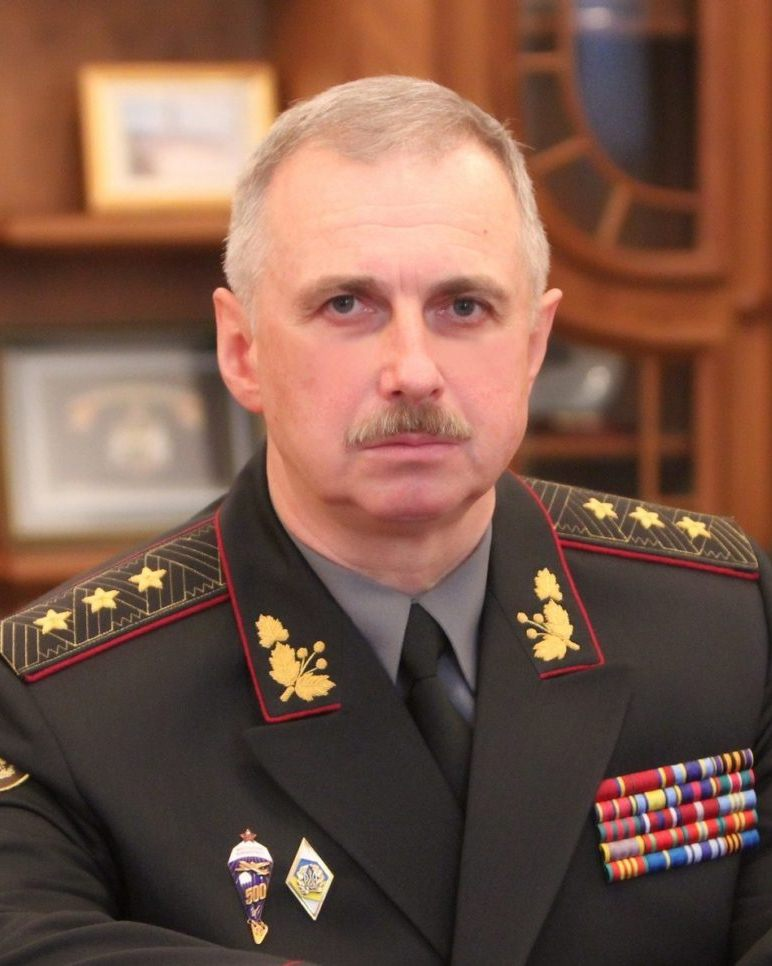
- Koval in 2021

Acting Minister of Defence of Ukraine
- In office 25 March 2014 – 3 July 2014
- Prime Minister: Arseniy Yatsenyuk
- Preceded by: Ihor Tenyukh
- Succeeded by: Valeriy Heletey

Personal details
- Born: 26 February 1956 (age 70) Izyaslav, Ukrainian SSR, Soviet Union
- Education: Frunze Military Academy
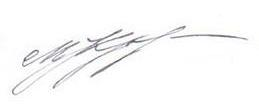
- Signature

Military service
- Allegiance: Soviet Union (to 1991); Ukraine
- Branch/service: Soviet Army; Ukrainian Ground Forces; SBGS
- Years of service: 1979–2021
- Battles/wars: Russo-Ukrainian War; Annexation of Crimea; War in Donbas

Colonel General Mykhailo Volodymyrovych Koval (Ukrainian: Михайло Володимирович Коваль; born 26 February 1956) is a Ukrainian military officer who until 2014 served in the State Border Guard Service of Ukraine. During the annexation of Crimea by the Russian Federation he was appointed as the Minister of Defence replacing outgoing Admiral Ihor Tenyukh who resigned.

== Biography ==
Mykhailo Koval was born on 26 February 1956 in the city of Iziaslav, Khmelnytskyi Oblast, Ukrainian SSR.

=== Military service ===
From September 1971 to June 1975, he studied at the Kamianets-Podilsky Industrial College at the mine surveying department. After graduating, he received the qualification of a "mining technician- mine surveyor" and attended the Kamianets-Podilsky Higher Military-Engineer Command School as a Second Lieutenant in the Sappers.

Until 1987 he served in the Sapper units of the Soviet Airborne Troops (VDV), in 1987 being a Captain, after which he entered the M. V. Frunze Military Academy in Moscow and graduated it in 1990 with the rank of Lieutenant Colonel. From 1990 to 1995, Koval served in a VDV training centre.

In 1997 he also graduated the National University of Defense of Ukraine. From 1997 to 1999, Koval worked in commanding positions of the Northern Operation Command, and from 1999 to 2001, the Western Operation Command. In 2001/2002 he served as the First Deputy Commander of the Internal Troops of Ukraine, since 2002 and until 2011 - Hold multiple positions the First Deputy Commander and human rcources manager of the State Border Guard Service of Ukraine. Since 2011 and until March 2014 - He became a full-timesources manager.

==== Russian annexation of Crimea ====
On 5 March 2014, during the annexation of Crimea, Colonel-General of the Border Troops Koval was abducted by "unknown formations in military uniform" near the military unit near Yalta, where he came to "lift the morale of Ukrainian border guards." According to Koval, he was kidnapped by the Russian Airborne Forces with the assistance of Crimean civilians. He was released the same day.

==== War in Donbas ====
On 25 March 2014, the Verkhovna Rada of approved him as Acting Minister of Defense of Ukraine, 251 deputies voted for this decision with the required minimum of 226 votes.

On 3 July 2014, the Verkhovna Rada, at the proposal of the President, relieved Koval from the duties of the Minister of Defense. The decision was approved by 327 deputies with the required minimum of 226 votes. On the same day, by presidential decree, he was appointed to the post of Deputy Secretary of the National Security and Defense Council of Ukraine. He served in this post until 27 February 2021, and from 17 February 2015, he became the First Deputy Secretary of the National Security and Defense Council.

From 24 February 2022 to 15 August 2022, he was the Chief of Staff and Deputy Chief of the National Defense University of Ukraine. Since 16 August 2022, he has been serving as the Rector of the NDUU.

== Awards and decorations ==
- Order of Merit (Ukraine)
- Medal For Military Service to Ukraine
- Defender of the Motherland Medal
- Dignity and Honour Commendation
- Order of the Red Star
- Order for Service to the Homeland in the Armed Forces of the USSR
- Medal for Battle Merit
- Jubilee Medal "70 Years of the Armed Forces of the USSR"
- Medal "For Impeccable Service" (15 years)
- Medal "For Impeccable Service" (10 years)

== See also ==
- Annexation of Crimea by the Russian Federation
- Minister of Defense (Ukraine)

Military offices
Preceded by M. I. Kolisnichenko	Commander of the 30th Armoured Division; 1997–1999	Succeeded by Viktor Myshakovsky
Preceded by First	Commander of the 80th Airmobile Regiment; 1992–1995	Succeeded by Mykola Novak
