= 11th Artillery Brigade (Ukraine) =

Ukrainian Ground Forces unit

- 11-та гвардійська окрема Київська Червонопрапорна, ордена Богдана Хмельницького артилерійська бригада
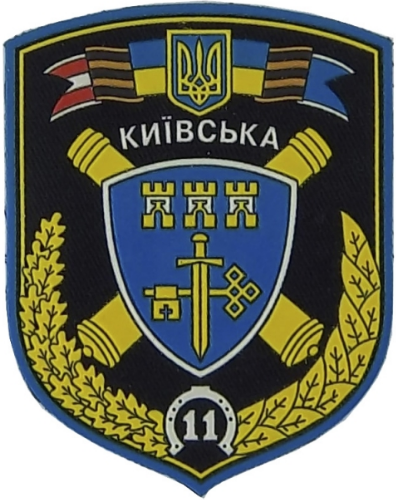
- Sleeve patch for the 11th Artillery Brigade
- Active: 18 August 2004 – 2013
- Country: Ukraine
- Branch: Ukrainian Ground Forces
- Type: Brigade
- Role: Artillery
- Part of: 13th Army Corps
- Garrison/HQ: Ternopil, Ternopil Oblast, Ukraine
- Anniversaries: 18 August 2004
- Equipment: D-20; MT-12 Rapira
- Decorations: Order of the Red Banner; Order of Bogdan Khmelnitsky
- Battle honours: Kiev

Commanders
- Commanding officer: Colonel Sergiy Korniychuk
- Second-in-command: Lieutenant Colonel Dmutro Kozachenko

Insignia
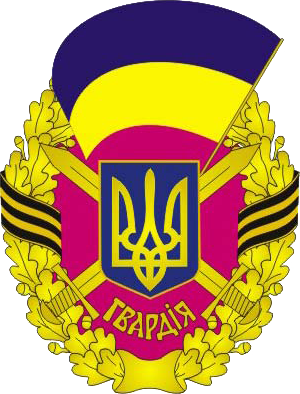
- Guards unit

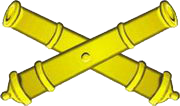
- Artillery branch insignia

The 11th Artillery Brigade (Ukrainian: 11-та артилерійська бригада, romanized: 11-ta artyleriys'ka bryhada) was a formation of the Ukrainian Ground Forces. The brigade's full name of the brigade was the 11th Separate Guards Artillery Kyiv Red Banner Order of Bogdan Khmelnitsky Brigade.

The brigade was the successor of the 1st Guards Cannon Artillery Kiev Red Banner Order of Bogdan Khmelnitsky Brigade, formed on 18 August 1942 in Stalingrad.

It was part of 13th Army Corps. It was based in Ternopil, in western Ukraine. The Brigade was formed on 18 August 2004 on the base of 12th Artillery Regiment of the 1st Tactical Artillery Group. Group commander Colonel Sergiy Korniychuk became Brigade's Commanding officer. The Brigade took its conscripts from the Ivano-Frankivsk, Chernivtsi, Lviv and Ternopil oblasts (provinces). The brigade was disbanded in 2013.

== History ==
1st Cannon Artillery Brigade was created on 18 August 1943 in Stalingrad. First Brigade commander was Guards Colonel Volodymyr Kerp.

On 1 March 1943, the Brigade was awarded Guards designation for successful actions near Stalingrad. At the end of March 1943 the Brigade was relocated to the Central Front near Kursk. Between 5–12 July 1943 the Brigade took part in the Battle of Kursk. It took part in the Liberation of Oryol, Hlukhiv, Konotop and on 29 September 1943 was one of the first units to cross the Dnieper River. On 6 November 1943 the Brigade was awarded the honorable name "Kiev" for liberating the city of Kyiv.

From 14 March to 15 May 1944 the brigade took active part in the liberation of Ternopil. Then, the Brigade moved toward Lviv and crossed the Ukrainian-Polish border. During the battles for the liberation of Poland, for crossing the Vistula River and a battle near Sandomierz, the Brigade was awarded the Order of the Red Banner on 19 February 1945. The Brigade provided artillery fire in the liberation of Kielce, the Oder River and the Lusatian Neisse crossings, and the attack on Dresden.

On 10 May 1945, the Brigade, being part of 5th Guards Army, liberated Prague. The Brigade was awarded the Order of Bogdan Khmelnitsky Second Class on 4 June 1945 for valour and heroism.

After the war, it became the 897th Guards Cannon Artillery Regiment.

The Brigade has been stationed in the following cities:

- Prague, Czechoslovakia - May–June 1945
- Allentsteig, Austria - June–October 1945
- Byškov, Czechoslovakia - October–November 1945
- Budapest, Hungary - November 1945 – December 1947
- Vapniarka, Vinnytsia Oblast, Ukrainian SSR - December 1947 – June 1949
- Ternopil, Ukrainian SSR (then Ukraine) - June 1949 – present

The brigade was disbanded on 31 December 2013.

== Commanders ==
- (2004 – 2012) - Colonel Serhiy Korniychuk
- (2012 – 2013) - Colonel Lisovyi Petrovych Oleh

== Brigade Order of Battle (2004) ==
- Howitzer Artillery Battalion
- Anti-tank Artillery Battalion

== Awards ==
Ribbon	Award	Date	Notes
	Guards designation	1 March 1943	for successful actions near Stalingrad
	Honorific	6 November 1943	for liberating Kiev
	Order of the Red Banner	19 February 1945	for crossing Vistula River and battle near Sandomierz
	Order of Bogdan Khmelnitsky	4 June 1945	For valour and heroism during liberation of Prague

Throughout World War II 8,270 soldiers from the Brigade were awarded Medals and Orders. 9 of them became Heroes of the Soviet Union:

- Guards Captain Nikolai Posohin
- Guards Captain Mikhail Zonov
- Guards Captain Vladimir Strizhak
- Guards Senior Lieutenant Mikhail Volk
- Guards Senior Lieutenant Grigoriy Sidorov
- Guards Sergeant Petr Kharkovskiy
- Guards Senior Sergeant Kashagan Dzhamangaraev
- Guards Senior Sergeant Grigoriy Cherniy
- Guards Senior Sergeant Botabay Sadikov
