= Serhiy Kyrychenko =

Ukrainian former General of the Army

- Born: 4 May 1952 (age 74); Novoselivka, Kharkiv Oblast, Ukrainian SSR
- Military career
- Allegiance: Ukraine
- Service years: 1973 – 2009
- Rank: General of Army of Ukraine
- Units: 128th Mechanized Division; 13th Army Corps; General Staff
- Commands: Ukrainian Armed Forces
- Awards: Order of Bohdan Khmelnytsky Third Class

General of Army of Ukraine Serhiy Kyrychenko (born 4 May 1952) was the 9th Chief of the General Staff and Commander-in-Chief of the Armed Forces of Ukraine.

== Early career ==
Serhiy Kyrychenko was born in 1952 in Novoselivka, a small village in Kharkiv Oblast, Ukraine to a working-class family.

== Education ==
In 1973, Serhiy Kyrychenko graduated from Kharkiv Armour Command school. In 1983 he graduated from command faculty of Malinovsky Military Armored Forces Academy. In 2000, Serhiy Kyrychenko graduated from the faculty of preparation of the operational-strategic level officers’ of the National Academy of Defence of Ukraine with golden medal.

== Career ==
Serhiy Kyrychenko started his military career in Kyiv Military District as commander of armour platoon. During 1975–1992, he occupied positions of armour company commander, chief of staff of armour battalion, chief of staff of armour regiment, commander of armour regiment and deputy division commander.

In 1992, after the fall of the Soviet Union, he joined the newly established Armed Forces of Ukraine. Until 2002, he served as commander of 128th mechanized division, chief of staff of the Army Corps and commander of the 13th Army Corps.

April 2002 Serhiy Kyrychenko was assigned on position of Deputy of the Chief of Staff of the Armed Forces of Ukraine. He was promoted to position of the Chief of the General Staff – the first Deputy of the Commander-in-Chief of the Army of the Armed Forces of Ukraine in January 2003 and remained in that position until July 2004.

On June 6, 2005, by Decree # 961/2005 of the President of Ukraine Viktor Yushchenko, he was assigned to be the Chief of the General Staff – Commander-in-Chief of the Armed Forces of Ukraine.

From November 2009 to March 2010 — Adviser to the President of Ukraine.

From May 2010 to September 2019 — Adviser to the Minister of Defence of Ukraine.

From September 2019 to April 2020 — Adviser to the Chief of the General Staff — Commander-in-Chief of the Armed Forces of Ukraine.

From April 2020 — Adviser to the Commander-in-Chief of the Armed Forces of Ukraine.

== Dates of rank ==
- Lieutenant, : 1973
- Colonel, 128th Mechanized Division:
- Major General, : August 23, 1995
- Lieutenant General, 13th Army Corps: 2002
- Colonel General, General Staff: January 2005
- General of Army of Ukraine, General Staff: August 21, 2007

== Awards and decorations ==
Serhiy Kyrychenko earned the following decorations and awards:

- 10 Years Military Service
- 15 Years Military Service
- 20 Years Military Service
- Order of Bohdan Khmelnytsky Third Class – August 21, 2006
- For perfect service ІІІ-rd grade
- 10 years of Ukrainian Armed Forces
- Decoration of the Minister of Defense “Veteran of military service”

Military offices
| Preceded by Oleksandr Zatynaiko | Chief of the General Staff; 2004–2009 | Succeeded by Ivan Svyda |
| Preceded by | Commander of the 13th Army Corps; 1999–2002 | Succeeded by |
| Preceded by Vyacheslav Zabolotnyi | Commander of the 128th Mechanized Brigade; 1995–1998 | Succeeded by Oleksandr Maslenchuk |
