= Admiral (Ukraine) =

Admiral Адмірал
- Shoulder and sleeve insignia
- Country: Ukraine
- Service branch: Ukrainian Navy
- Rank group: Flag officer
- Rank: Admiral
- Non-NATO rank: OF-9
- Formation: 1991 (current)
- Next lower rank: Vice admiral
- Equivalent ranks: Colonel general (until 2020); General (from 2020)

Admiral (Ukrainian: Адмірал, romanized: Admiral) is a top military rank in the Ukrainian Navy. It is equivalent to the Colonel General rank in the Ground Forces of Ukraine.

There are three admiral ranks in the Ukrainian Navy and other two include Vice Admiral and Counter Admiral.

== Admirals of Ukraine ==
- Mykhailo Yezhel (2000)
- Ihor Tenyukh (2008)
- Viktor Maksymov (2010)
- Ihor Kabanenko (2012)
- Yuriy Ilyin (2013)
- Ihor Alferiev (2013)
- Ihor Voronchenko (2018)

== Past Admirals ==
- Andriy Pokrovsky (1918)

== See also ==
- Military ranks of Ukraine
