= Oleksandr Syrskyi =

Ukrainian military officer (born 1965)

- Олександр Сирський
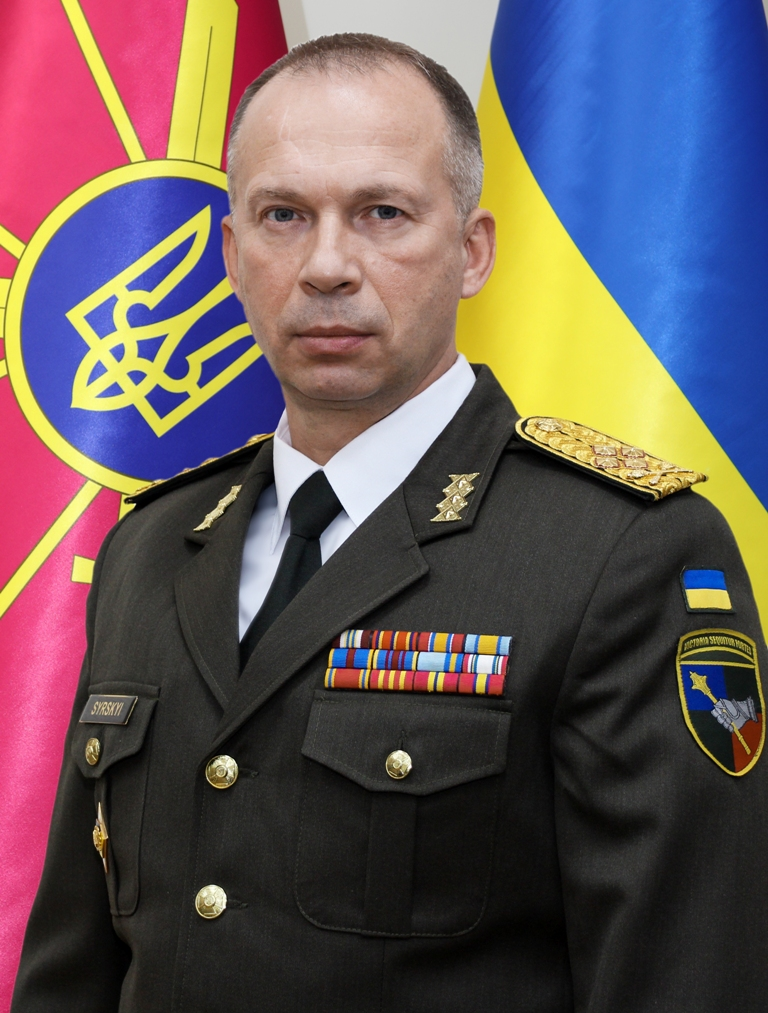
- Official portrait, 2021

Commander-in-Chief of the Armed Forces of Ukraine
- In office 8 February 2024 – 21 July 2026
- President: Volodymyr Zelenskyy
- Prime Minister: Denys Shmyhal; Yulia Svyrydenko
- Preceded by: Valerii Zaluzhnyi
- Succeeded by: Mykhailo Drapatyi

Commander of the Ukrainian Ground Forces
- In office 5 August 2019 – 11 February 2024
- President: Volodymyr Zelenskyy
- Prime Minister: Volodymyr Groysman; Oleksiy Honcharuk; Denys Shmyhal
- Preceded by: Serhiy Popko
- Succeeded by: Oleksandr Pavliuk

Personal details
- Born: Oleksandr Stanislavovych Syrskyi; 26 July 1965 (age 61) Novinki, Vladimir Oblast, Soviet Union
- Children: 2
- Education: Moscow Higher Military Command School
- Awards: Hero of Ukraine; Cross of Military Merit; Order of Bohdan Khmelnytsky I, II and III degree
- Nickname(s): Butcher; General 200

Military service
- Allegiance: Soviet Union; Ukraine
- Branch/service: Soviet Ground Forces; Ukrainian Ground Forces
- Years of service: 1986–1991 (Soviet Union); 1991–present (Ukraine)
- Rank: General
- Commands: Ukrainian Ground Forces, 2019–
- Battles/wars: Soviet-Afghan War; Russo-Ukrainian war; War in Donbas; Battle of Debaltseve; Russian invasion of Ukraine; Battle of Kyiv; Kharkiv counteroffensive; Battle of Lyman (September–October 2022); Battle of Bakhmut; 2023 Ukrainian counteroffensive; Battle of Avdiivka

Oleksandr Stanislavovych Syrskyi (Note: In this name that follows East Slavic naming customs, the patronymic is Stanislavovych and the family name is Syrskyi.) (Ukrainian: Олександр Станіславович Сирський; born 26 July 1965) is a Ukrainian military officer holding the rank of four-star general who served as the Commander-in-Chief of the Armed Forces of Ukraine from 2024 to 2026. Previously, he was the commander of the Ukrainian Ground Forces from 2019 to 2024, and the commander of the Joint Forces Operation from May to August 2019.

During the Russian invasion of Ukraine, Syrskyi commanded the defence of Kyiv. In September 2022, he commanded the Kharkiv counteroffensive. He then led the defense of Bakhmut into 2023. Following the eruption of public protests at the sacking of his Defence Minister boss Mykhailo Fedorov, Syrskyi was replaced by Mykhailo Drapatyi on 21 July 2026.

== Early life and career ==
Syrskyi was born on 26 July 1965 in the village of Novinki, Vladimir Oblast, Russian SFSR, into a military family, the son of Lyudmila and Stanislav Syrskyi. As of 2023, his parents and brother live in Russia. In 1980, when Syrskyi was 15, his father was transferred to serve in the Soviet Armed Forces in Kharkiv, Ukrainian SSR. Syrskyi graduated from high school in Kharkiv and entered the Moscow Higher Military Command School, the Soviet Union's most prestigious military academy.

After his graduation in 1986, Syrskyi joined the Soviet Artillery Corps. He initially served in a self-propelled artillery unit equipped with the 152 mm 2S5 Giatsint-S and 203 mm 2S7 Pion self propelled howitzers, including in units earmarked to fire nuclear shells. He later served in Rocket Artillery units fielding the BM-27 Uragan MBRL. He served in Afghanistan, the Tajik SSR, and Czechoslovakia until the dissolution of the Soviet Union in 1991.

In 1993, following the dissolution of the USSR, Syrskyi's military unit in Chuhuiv was placed under Ukrainian command, and at the age of 28 he was promoted to the position of battalion commander (equivalent to the rank of lieutenant-colonel) in the 6th Division of the National Guard of Ukraine; he later became a regiment commander in that division. In 1996, Syrskyi graduated from the National Defense University of Ukraine, and in 2005 he received a graduate degree from the same university.

In the early 2000s, Syrskyi was promoted to commander of the 72nd Mechanized Brigade, based in Bila Tserkva and promoted to the rank of major-general. He was appointed as a Chief of Staff – first deputy of the United Operative Commander of the Ukrainian Armed Forces in 2007. In 2009, Syrskyi was promoted to major general by decree of President Viktor Yushchenko. In 2011–2012, he was first deputy of the Main Directorate of military collaboration and peace-keeping operations. In 2013 he was stationed at NATO's headquarters in Brussels.

== Russo-Ukrainian War ==
=== War in Donbas ===
At the beginning of the war in Eastern Ukraine, he was the chief of staff of anti-terrorist operations. In particular, he was one of the chief commanders of the anti-terrorist operation forces during the battle of Debaltseve. In the winter of 2015, he went to the city with the Chief of the General Staff of the Armed Forces of Ukraine Viktor Muzhenko. He led the battles in Vuhlehirsk, the village of Ridkodub and an unsuccessful attempt to recapture Lohvynove. He also coordinated the withdrawal of the Ukrainian military from Debaltseve. Under his leadership, possible routes of crossing the Karapulka River were blown up.

Oleksandr Syrskyi was awarded the Order of Bohdan Khmelnytsky III degree and later received the rank of lieutenant-general due to his achievement during the battle of Debaltseve. In 2016, he headed the Joint Operational Headquarters of the Armed Forces of Ukraine, which coordinates the operational actions of various Ukrainian security forces in the Donbas. In 2017, he was the commander of the entire Anti-Terrorist Operation in eastern Ukraine. It was later replaced by the Joint Forces Operation.

He commanded the Joint Operational Staff of the Armed Forces of Ukraine from 6 May until 5 August 2019, when Syrskyi was appointed as Commander of the Ground Forces of the Armed Forces of Ukraine. On 23 August 2020, he was promoted to the rank of colonel general.

=== Russian invasion of Ukraine ===
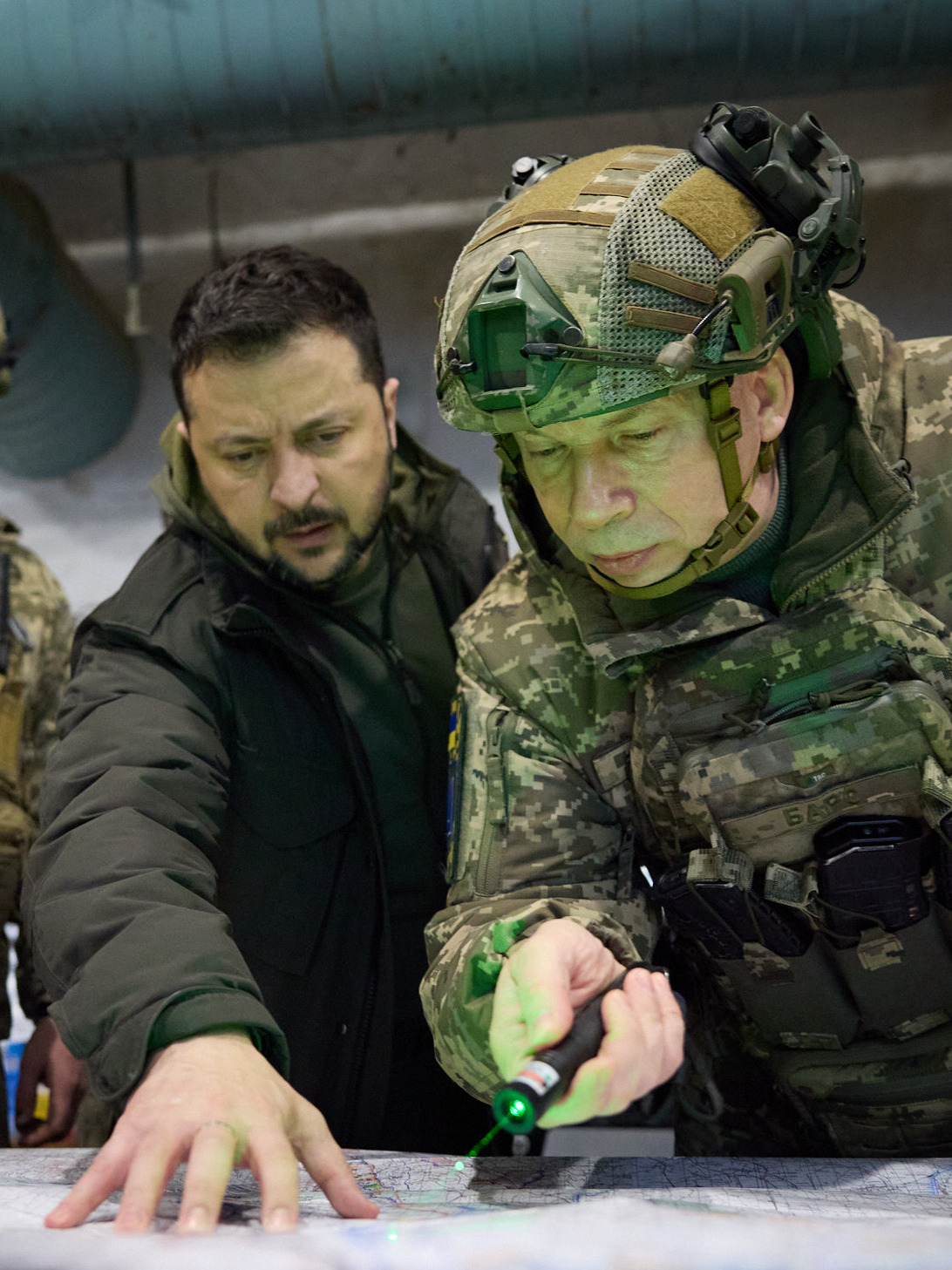
President Volodymyr Zelenskyy with Oleksandr Syrskyi at the headquarters of the Defense Forces in Kupyansk, Kharkiv region on 30 November 2023

During the 2022 Russian invasion of Ukraine, Syrskyi initially organised and led the defense of Kyiv.

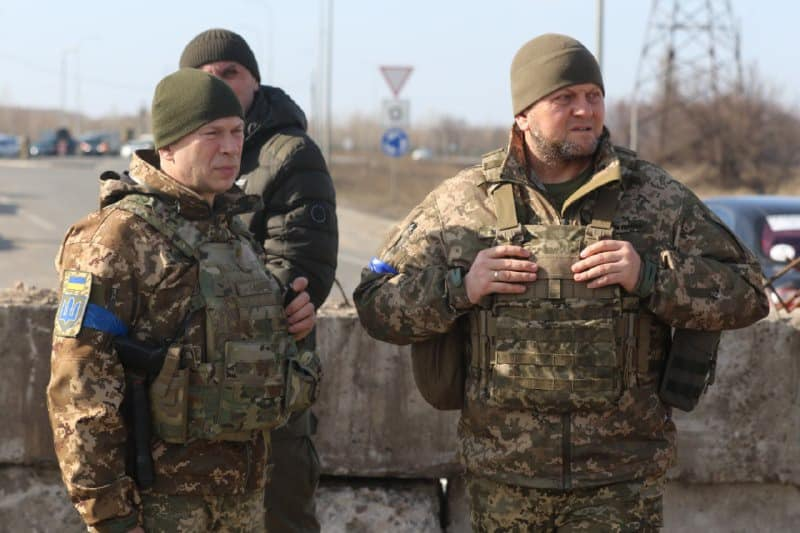
Syrskyi with Valerii Zaluzhnyi (right) during the battle for Kyiv, 2022

In April 2022, Syrskyi was awarded the Hero of Ukraine. In September 2022, media reported that Syrskyi was the architect behind the successful Kharkiv counteroffensive. Syrskyi's pursuit of bloody Soviet-style military tactics which resulted in significant Ukrainian losses during the Battle of Bakhmut earned him criticism, and he was nicknamed "General 200" (a reference to Cargo 200, a Soviet military code denoting military fatalities).

Following months of speculation of a rift between Valerii Zaluzhnyi and President Zelenskyy, the Zaluzhny was replaced as commander-in-chief by Oleksandr Syrskyi as the on 8 February 2024. On 17 February 2024, as his first major operational decision as commander-in-chief, Syrskyi ordered the complete withdrawal of Ukrainian forces from Avdiivka to "more favourable lines ... to avoid encirclement and preserve the lives and health of service personnel". He announced on 28 April 2024 that Ukrainian forces had retreated from the villages of Berdychi, Semenivka, and Novomykhailivka in Donetsk Oblast due to the positions becoming untenable.

In an interview with The Guardian published on 24 July 2024, Syrskyi predicted victory as he vowed to "do everything we can to reach the internationally recognised borders of 1991". Syrskyi was promoted to the rank of general on 23 August 2024.

In a report of activities in 2025, Syrskyi asserted that Ukraine's Armed Forces had added 16 new corps, and the Unmanned Systems Forces was expanded, and that 1.2 million Russian soldiers had been killed or wounded by the end of the year.

In July 2026, Syrskyi reported that defense operations reduced Russia's territorial gains by more than half, and that 32,000 Russian soldiers had been killed or wounded in June 2026. That month, Syrskyi's rivalry with the defence minister Mykhailo Fedorov came to a head. As a result, Fedorov was dismissed. Fedorov's removal prompted protests across Ukraine calling for his reinstatement and for Syrskyi's removal. One protest leader accused the general of causing demoralization, sabotaging reforms, rewarding loyalty to himself and repressing soldiers; defenders of Syrskyi argued that hardships of the war were being unfairly taken out on the general and that Fedorov's plans for robotic warfare were unrealistic. Ukrainian military members interviewed by the BBC lauded Syrski's great experience and key victories against Russia, but noted his outdated Soviet doctrine. Syrskyi was replaced by Mykhailo Drapatyi on 21 July 2026.

== Personal life ==
Syrskyi is married, and has two sons, Anton and Oleksandr, with his wife. He is a persistent subject of Russian disinformation, including that he has an adopted son in Australia, an assertion that Western media has debunked.

Syrskyi's parents and younger brother reside in Russia. According to his brother Oleg, they have not spoken with each other for many years.

== Military ranks ==
- Major general (20 August 2009)
- Lieutenant general (5 December 2016)
- Colonel general (23 August 2020)
- General (23 August 2024)

== Awards ==
- Order of Bohdan Khmelnytsky III degree (14 March 2015)
- Order of Bohdan Khmelnytsky II degree (18 March 2022)
- Hero of Ukraine (5 April 2022)
- Cross of Military Merit (27 July 2022)
- Order of Bohdan Khmelnytsky I degree (11 December 2022)
