= General of the Army of Ukraine =

General of the Army of Ukraine генерал армії України
- Shoulder insignia (2016–2020)
- Country: Ukraine
- Service branch: Ukrainian Ground Forces
- Rank group: General officer
- Non-NATO rank: OF-10
- Formation: 25 March 1992
- Abolished: 1 October 2020
- Next lower rank: General

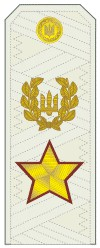
Shoulder insignia (1992–2016)

General of the Army of Ukraine (Ukrainian: генерал армії України, romanized: heneral armiyi Ukrayiny) was a general officer and was the highest possible rank in the Armed Forces of Ukraine. General of army of Ukraine ranks immediately above a colonel general and has no equivalent naval rank. The rank was also given to general of interior service or civil defense of Ukraine.

The first person to be awarded the rank was Andriy Vasylyshyn on August 19, 1993.

On November 13, 1918, the Minister of Defense Oleksander Hrekov awarded to the soldier congress delegate in Directorate Symon Petlyura the rank of Supreme Otaman. That award was the only official occurrence of that unique rank.

After October 2020, the rank is not given.

== Generals of the Army of Ukraine ==
=== Generals of the Army ===
- Vitaliy Radetsky, November 30, 1993, Minister of Defense (1993–1994)
- Valeriy Hubenko, January 25, 1994, Commander of Border Guards (1991–1995)
- Yevhen Marchuk, March 23, 1994, Chief of the Security Service of Ukraine (1991–1994)
- Oleksandr Kuzmuk, August 23, 1998, Minister of Defense (1996–2001)
- Leonid Derkach, August 23, 2000, Chief of the Security Service of Ukraine (1998–2001)
- Volodymyr Radchenko, 21 August 2001, Chief of the Security Service of Ukraine (1995–1998, 2001-2003)
- Volodymyr Shkidchenko, August 23, 2001, Chief of the General Staff of Armed Forces of Ukraine (1998–2001)
- Ihor Drizhchanyi, November 30, 2006, Chief of the Security Service of Ukraine (2005–2006)
- Serhiy Kirichenko, August 21, 2007, Chief of the General Staff (2005–2009)
- Mykola Lytvyn, August 20, 2008, Chief of Border Guards (2001–2014)
- Oleksandr Kikhtenko, August 20, 2008, Commander of Internal Troops (2005–2010)
- Mykola Malomuzh, November 28, 2008, Chief of the Foreign Intelligence Service (2005–2010)
- Ivan Svyda, February 15, 2010, Chief of the General Staff (2009–2010)
- Valeriy Khoroshkovsky, August 12, 2011, Chief of the Security Service of Ukraine (2010–2012)
- Viktor Muzhenko, October 14, 2015, Chief of the General Staff and Commander-in-Chief of the Armed Forces of Ukraine (2014–2019)
- Stepan Poltorak, October 14, 2015, Minister of Defence of Ukraine (2014–2019)

=== Generals of the Interior Service ===
- Andriy Vasylyshyn, August 19, 1993, Minister of Interior Affairs (1990–1994)
- Vasyl Durdynets, August 21, 1997, First Vice-Premier Minister (1996–1997)
- Yuriy Kravchenko, August 23, 1998, Minister of Interior Affairs (1995–2001)
- Ivan Hladush, August 20, 2010, Director of the National Museum Chernobyl
- Vitaliy Zakharchenko, December 16, 2011, Minister of Interior Affairs (2011–2014)
