= General Staff of the Armed Forces of Ukraine =

Military staff of the Armed Forces of Ukraine

General Staff of the Armed Forces
- Ukrainian: Генеральний штаб Збройних сил України
- General Staff emblem

- General Staff flag

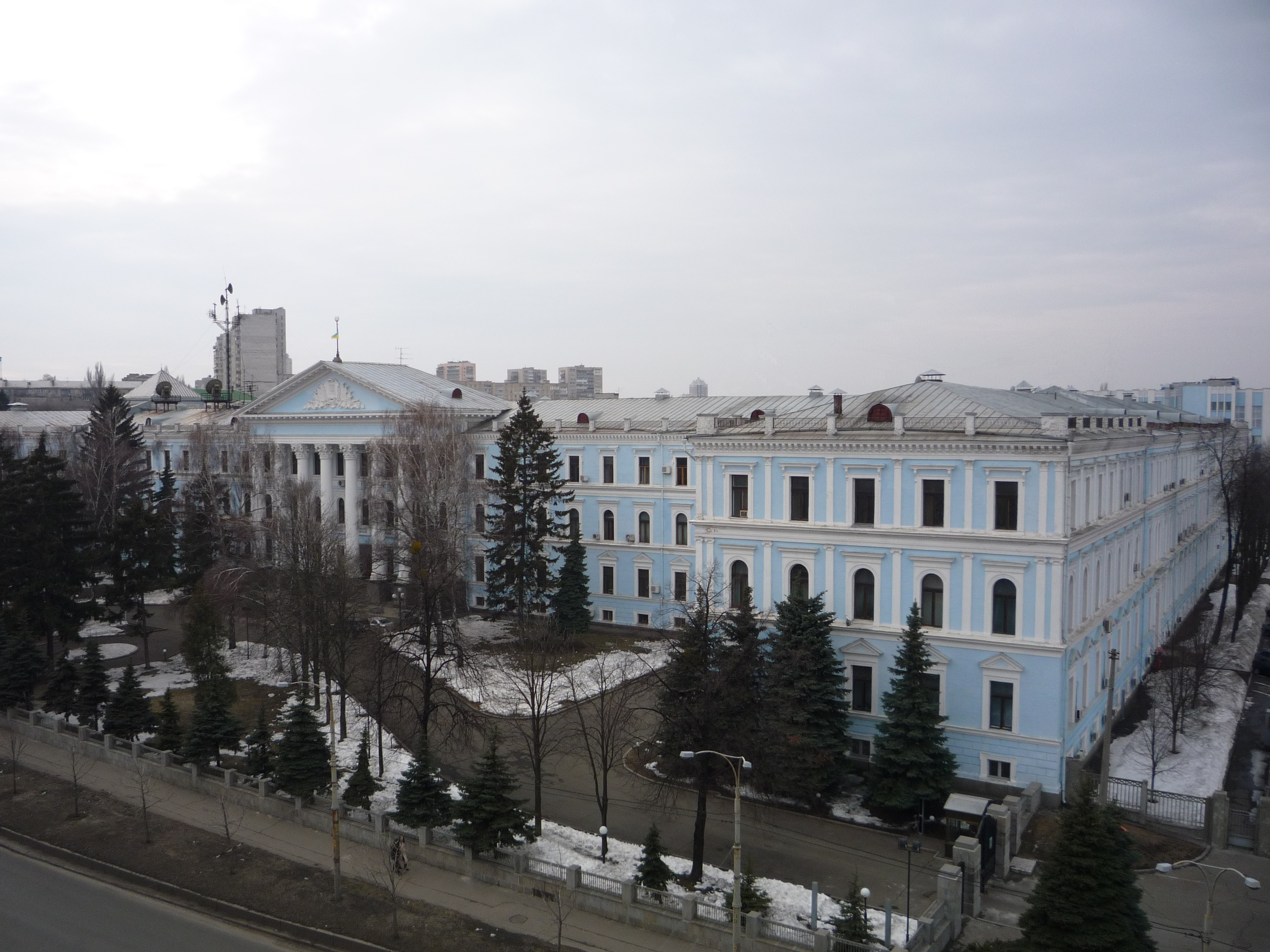
- Ministry of Defence Building in Kyiv

Staff overview
- Formed: 1992
- Preceding Staff: General Staff of the Armed Forces of the Soviet Union
- Jurisdiction: Ukraine
- Headquarters: Kyiv
- Minister responsible: Yevhenii Khmara (acting), Minister of Defense
- Staff executives: Gen. Mykhailo Drapatyi, Commander-in-Chief of the Armed Forces; Ihor Skybiuk, Chief of the General Staff; Andrii Kovalov, Spokesperson
- Website: www.mil.gov.ua

The General Staff of the Armed Forces of Ukraine (Ukrainian: Генеральний штаб Збройних сил України, romanized: Heneralnyi shtab Zbroinykh syl Ukrainy) is the military staff of the Armed Forces of Ukraine. It is the central organ of the Armed Forces Administration and oversees operational management of the armed forces under the Ministry of Defence of Ukraine.

The chief of the General Staff of the Armed Forces of Ukraine is appointed by the president of Ukraine, who is the supreme commander-in-chief of the Armed Forces of Ukraine. On 28 March 2020 the position of commander-in-chief of the Armed Forces of Ukraine was separated from that of the chief of the General Staff. The current chief of the General Staff is Ihor Skybiuk, and the Commander-in-Chief is Mykhailo Drapatyi.

The General Staff was created in 1991–1992 on the basis of the Kyiv Military District headquarters of the former Soviet Armed Forces.

== Organization ==
- Commander-in-Chief of the Armed Forces of Ukraine
- Chief of the General Staff of the Armed Forces of Ukraine
- Joint Operations Staff of the Armed Forces of Ukraine
  - Directorate of Legal Support
  - Department of the Chief Directorate of Intelligence
  - Financial Directorate
  - Office of assistants of the Chief of the General Staff
  - Deputies of the Chief of the General Staff
    - Chief Directorate of personnel management, Chief Directorate of moral and psychological support
    - Chief Directorate of personnel (J-1)
    - Chief Directorate of operations (J-3)
    - Chief Directorate of logistics (J-4)
    - Chief Directorate of defense and mobilization planning of the General Staff (J-5)
    - Chief Directorate of communication and information systems of the General Staff (J-6)
    - Chief Directorate of Armed Forces training (J-7)
    - Chief Military Medical Directorate (J-8)
    - Central Directorate of military service security
    - Chief Command Center
    - Directorate of special operations
    - Chief Directorate of operational support
    - Directorate of verification
    - Central Directorate of information security and cryptology
    - Chief Directorate of military cooperation and peacekeeping operations
    - Scientific Directorate of the General Staff
    - Military Music Directorate
    - Administration Directorate
    - Chief Finance and Economical Directorate

=== Past directorates ===
  - Assistants to the Chief of the General Staff
  - Control and Oversight Directorate
  - First Deputy Chief of the General Staff
    - Deputy Chief of the General Staff
      - Euro-Atlantic Integration Directorate
      - Military Cooperation Directorate
    - Garrison Service Directorate
  - First Deputy Chief of the General Staff
    - Deputy Chief of the General Staff
      - Military scientific directorate
      - Financial Directorate
      - Main Financial-Economic Directorate (J-8)
    - Deputy Chief of the General Staff
      - Section for Transition to All-Volunteer Contract Service
      - Military Symbols and Heraldry Section
    - Main Personnel Directorate (J-1)
    - Main Operations Directorate (J-3/7)
    - Main Defence Planning Directorate (J-5)
    - Legal Directorate

== Members of the General Staff ==
As of August 2025:

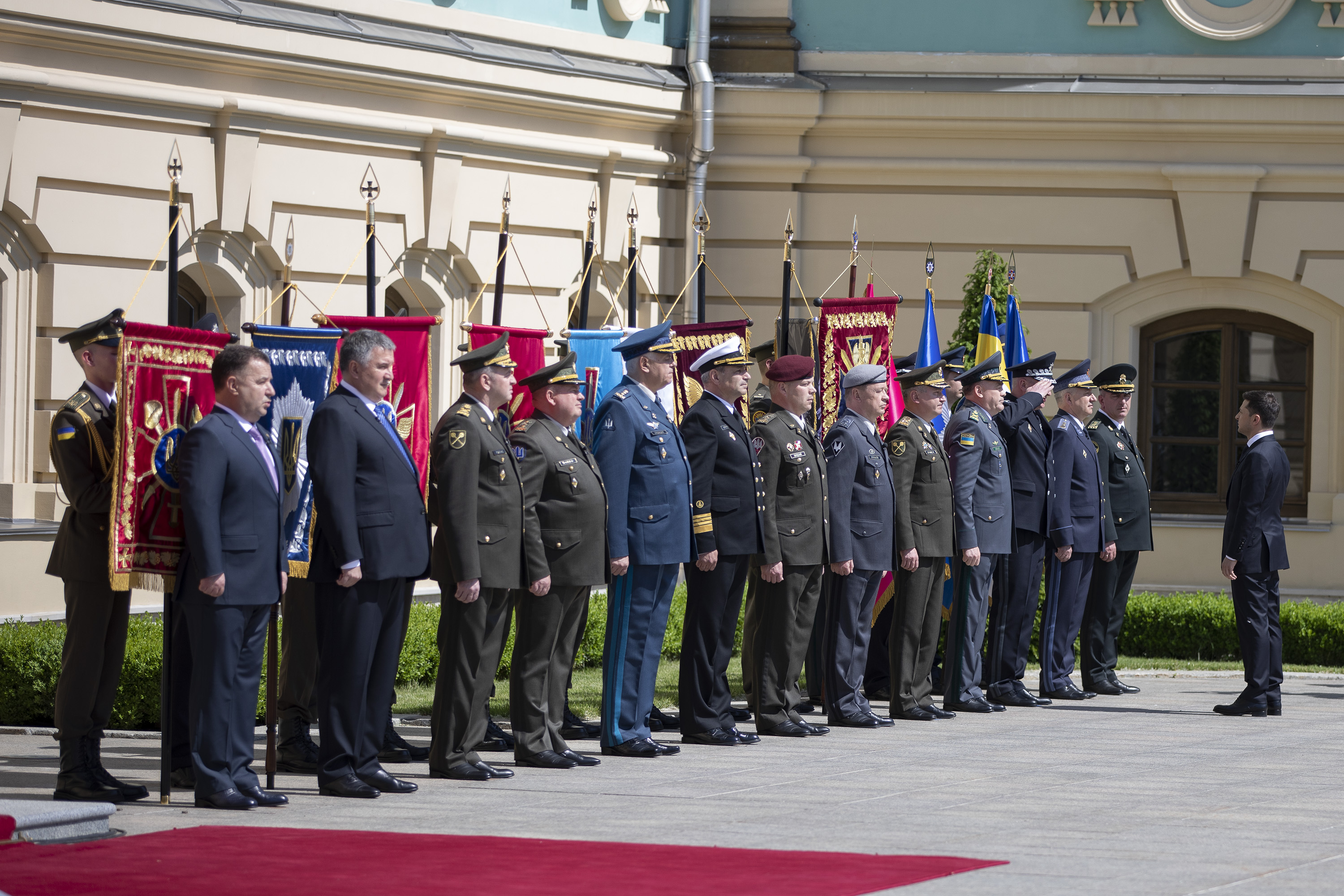
The senior leadership of the Armed Forces of Ukraine in June 2019. 4 of the 13 leaders seen here are members of the general staff.

- Commander-in-Chief of the Armed Forces: General Oleksandr Syrskyi (member of General Staff, ex officio)
- Deputy Commander-in-Chief of the Armed Forces: Vacant
- Chief of the General Staff: Brigadier General Ihor Skybiuk
- First Deputy Chief of the General Staff: Vacant
- Assistant Deputy Chiefs of the General Staff: Lieutenant Generals Serhii Naiev and Radion Tymoshenko
- Command Sergeant Major of the Armed Forces of Ukraine and Senior Enlisted Advisor to the Chief of the General Staff: Chief Master Sergeant Oleksandr Kosynskyi
- Commander of the Ground Forces: Major General Mykhailo Drapatyi
- Commander of the Marine Corps: Major General Dmytro Delyatytskyi
- Commander of the Navy: Vice Admiral Oleksiy Neizhpapa
- Commander of the Air Force: Lieutenant General Anatolii Kryvonozhko
- Commander of the Air Assault Forces: Vacant
- Commander of the Special Operations Forces: Brigadier General Oleksandr Trepak

Members with observer status:

- Commander of the Territorial Defense Forces: Major General Ihor Plakhuta
- Commander of the Unmanned Systems Forces: Major Robert Brovdi

== Insignia ==
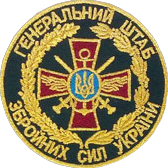
General Staff insignia

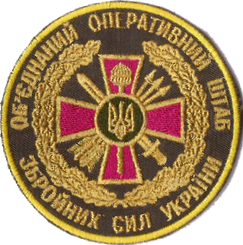
Joint Operations Staff insignia
