= Serhiy Korniychuk =

Ukrainian military personnel

- Сергій Петрович Корнійчук
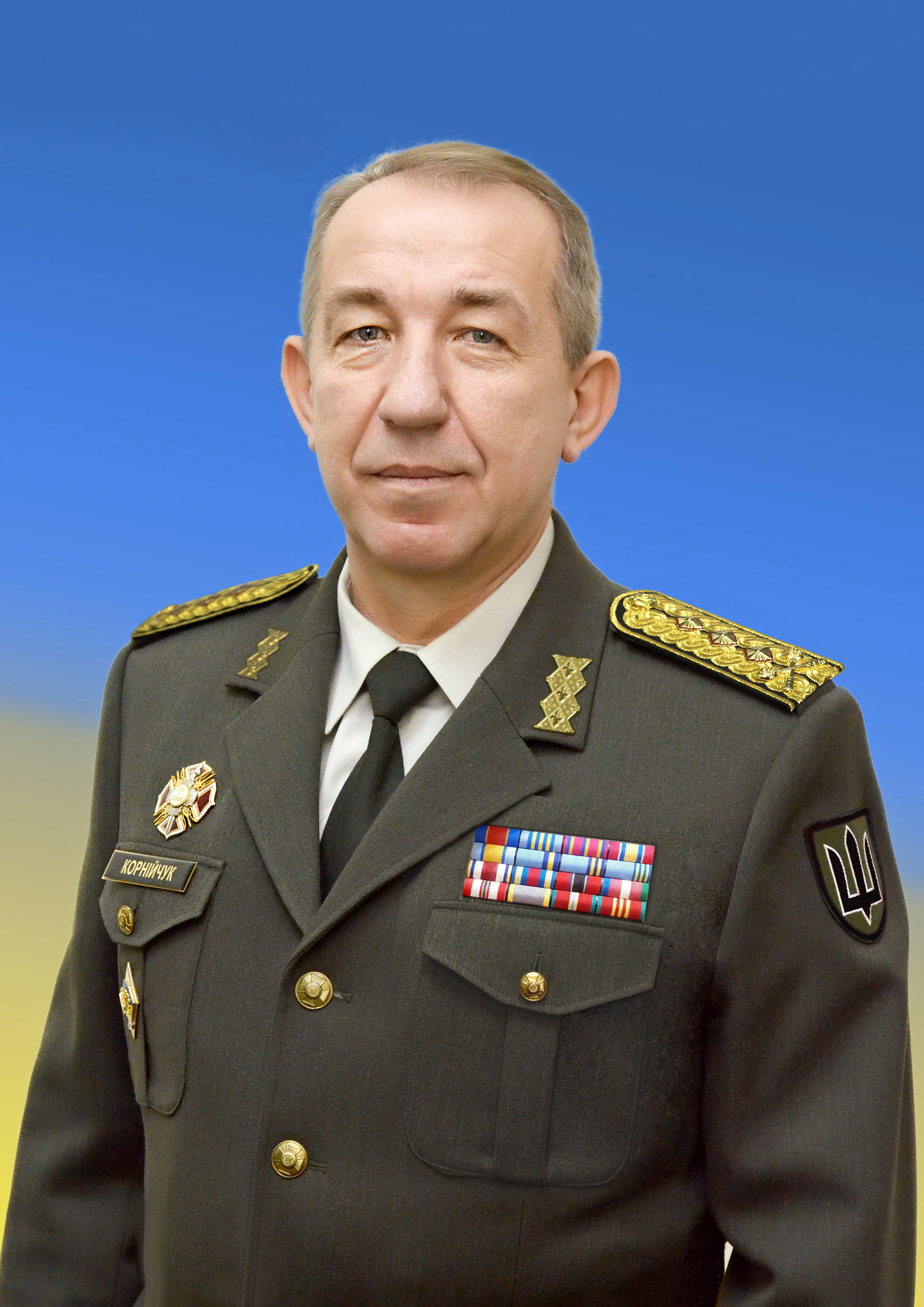
- Born: Serhiy Petrovych Korniychuk; 12 September 1965 (age 61); Orativ, Ukrainian SSR, Soviet Union
- Military career
- Allegiance: Soviet Union; Ukraine
- Branch: Ukrainian Ground Forces
- Service years: 1988–present
- Rank: Lieutenant general
- Commands: Chief of the General Staff; Commander of the Ukrainian Ground Forces
- Conflicts: Russo-Ukrainian War

Lieutenant General Serhiy Petrovych Korniychuk (Ukrainian: Сергій Петрович Корнійчук; born on 12 September 1965) is a Ukrainian army officer who became the Chief of the General Staff of the Armed Forces of Ukraine on 27 March 2020. General Korniychuk was dismissed as Chief of the General Staff of the Armed Forces of Ukraine on 28 July 2021.

== Biography ==
Serhiy Korniychuk was born on 12 September 1965.

In 1982 he entered the Khmelnytsky Higher Artillery Command School and became an artilleryman. He began his service in the artillery regiment of the 10th Guards Tank Division of the 3rd Army of the Group of Soviet Forces in Germany. After two years of service he headed a howitzer artillery battery. For excellent participation of the unit in military exercises he was awarded the medal "For Military Merit". After that he served in the Trans-Baikal Military District.

After the proclamation of Ukraine's independence in 1992, he returned home, transferred to the 97th Mechanized Division, which was soon reformed into a separate mechanized brigade. In 1996, Major Korniychuk's division successfully conducted a field outing with combat fire, taking first place in the Armed Forces. Korniychuk was awarded the medal "For Impeccable Service" of the third degree.

He graduated with honors from the operational and tactical level of the National Defense Academy of Ukraine, was appointed Deputy Brigade Commander of the 26th Artillery Division. In 2002-2003 Korniychuk was commander of the 359th artillery brigade of the 13th Army Corps. Since 2004, he was Commander of the 11th Separate Guards Artillery Brigade created on the basis of the 26th Artillery Division, Chief of the Ternopil Garrison. In 2005 he was awarded the Order of Danylo Halytsky.

In 2011 he graduated from the National University of Defense of Ukraine and received an operational and strategic level of training. In the same year, he was named "Man of the Year" in Ternopil Oblast. Since November 2012, he was Chief of Staff, and First Deputy Commander of the 6th Army Corps. From 2014 to March 2015, Chief of the Armament of the Armed Forces of Ukraine.

From 2015 to 2017, he was Chief Inspector of Technical Support. From April 2017, he was First Deputy Chief Inspector of the Ministry of Defense of Ukraine. In October 2015, Korniychuk received the rank of Major General.

In May 2019, by the Decree of the President of Ukraine, Korniychuk was awarded the next military rank of lieutenant general, and was appointed First Deputy Chief of the General Staff of the Armed Forces of Ukraine.

On 27 March 2020, he was appointed Chief of the General Staff of the Armed Forces of Ukraine.

On 28 July 2021, Ukrainian President Volodymyr Zelenskyy dismissed several high ranking Ukrainian military commanders, General Korniychuk was dismissed from his position as Chief of the General Staff of the Armed Forces of Ukraine at that time.
