= Andriy Hryshchenko =

Andriy Hryshchenko may refer to:

- Andriy Hryshchenko (footballer)
- Andriy Hryshchenko (general)
