= Andriy Hryshchenko (general) =

Ukrainian military personnel

- Андрій Миколайович Грищенко
- Born: Andriy Mykolayovych Hryshchenko; 5 October 1963 (age 63); Eskhar, Ukraine, Soviet Union
- Military career
- Allegiance: Soviet Union; Ukraine
- Branch: Ukrainian Ground Forces
- Service years: 1984-
- Rank: Lieutenant general
- Commands: Operational Command South (2016-2017)
- War in Donbass: Russo-Ukrainian War

Andriy Mykolayovych Hryshchenko (Ukrainian: Андрій Миколайович Грищенко; born on 5 October 1963), is a Ukrainian army officer who had served as the commander of the Operational Command South from 2016 to 2017, while serving in the Russo-Ukrainian war.

== Biography ==
Hryshchenko was born in Eskhar, Kharkiv Oblast on 5 October 1963, to a family of workers.

His father, Mykola, who is deceased, was a gas-electric welder. His mother worked as a machinist of turbine equipment. According to Hryschenko himself, there were no military personnel his family.

In 1984, he graduated from the Sumy Higher Artillery Command School. From 1984 to 1989, he served in the artillery brigade of the Group of Soviet Forces in Germany. After that, he was sent to Transcaucasia, to Akhalkalak in Georgia, where the events that preceded the collapse of the Soviet Union were just beginning.

After the collapse of the Soviet Union, he served in the Ukrainian army in Chuhuiv, Kharkiv Oblast.

In 2003, he graduated from the National Defense Academy of Ukraine.

In 2007, Hryshchenko replaced Ruslan Khomchak as commander of the 72nd Separate Mechanized Brigade (Bila Tserkva).

In 2010, he was elected a member of the Bilotserkiv city council, and joined the "Party of Regions" faction. According to the testimony of the All-Ukrainian lustration NGO, during the Euromaidan, Colonel Hryshchenko provided army tents and field kitchens for the use of Anti-Maidan activists in Kyiv.

At the beginning of pro-Russian unrest in eastern Ukraine, units of the 72nd OMBr, led by Hryshchenko, performed tasks around Mariupol, after which on 7 June 2014, the 1st and 2nd battalions went on a raid along the border with the Russia, took control of the border zone near the settlements of Amvrosiivka, Zelenopillia, Marynivka, Dovzhansky, held Savur-Mohyla, and Chervonopartizansk (control point). Their task was to reach the border and cut off the terrorists from logistical support from Russia. Then, in support of terrorist groups, shelling of Ukrainian units from Russian territory with Grad and Uragan surface-to-air missiles began. The units of the 72nd, 79th, 24th brigades and the border guards found themselves in the ring of fire; they could not respond to the shelling from Russian territory, on the other hand, pro-Russian terrorists were firing, taking cover in populated areas. The fighters of the brigade repeatedly found themselves in a difficult situation and complained about the inadequacy of the command and the leakage of information.

During the fighting on the border, being encircled, due to a lack of ammunition, they were forced to leave the area, and part broke out of the encirclement together with units of the 79th and 24th brigades, the other part entered Russian territory on the night of 4 August. Before leaving, the remains of military equipment and weapons were destroyed. Later, an agreement was reached on the return of the military to Ukraine. The brigade was supplemented with personnel and combat equipment and in September 2014 returned to the ATO zone, where it held positions around Volnovakha, from Granitny to Olhinka.

He received an operational-strategic level of education after graduating from the National Defense University of Ukraine in 2015.

On 7 May 2015, Hryshchenko was appointed first deputy commander of the Operational Command North. He took office in June 2015.

Within three months he was promoted to major general.

On 11 April 2016, Hryshchenko was appointed commander of the Operational Command South.

On 23 August 2017, he was promoted to lieutenant general. On 16 November, he is replaced by his successor Oleh Vyshnivsky.

Since January 2018, he has been the deputy commander of the ground forces of the Armed Forces of Ukraine for combat training.
