= Andrii Kovalchuk =

Ukrainian military officer (born 1974)

Major-General Andrii Kovalchuk
- Андрій Ковальчук
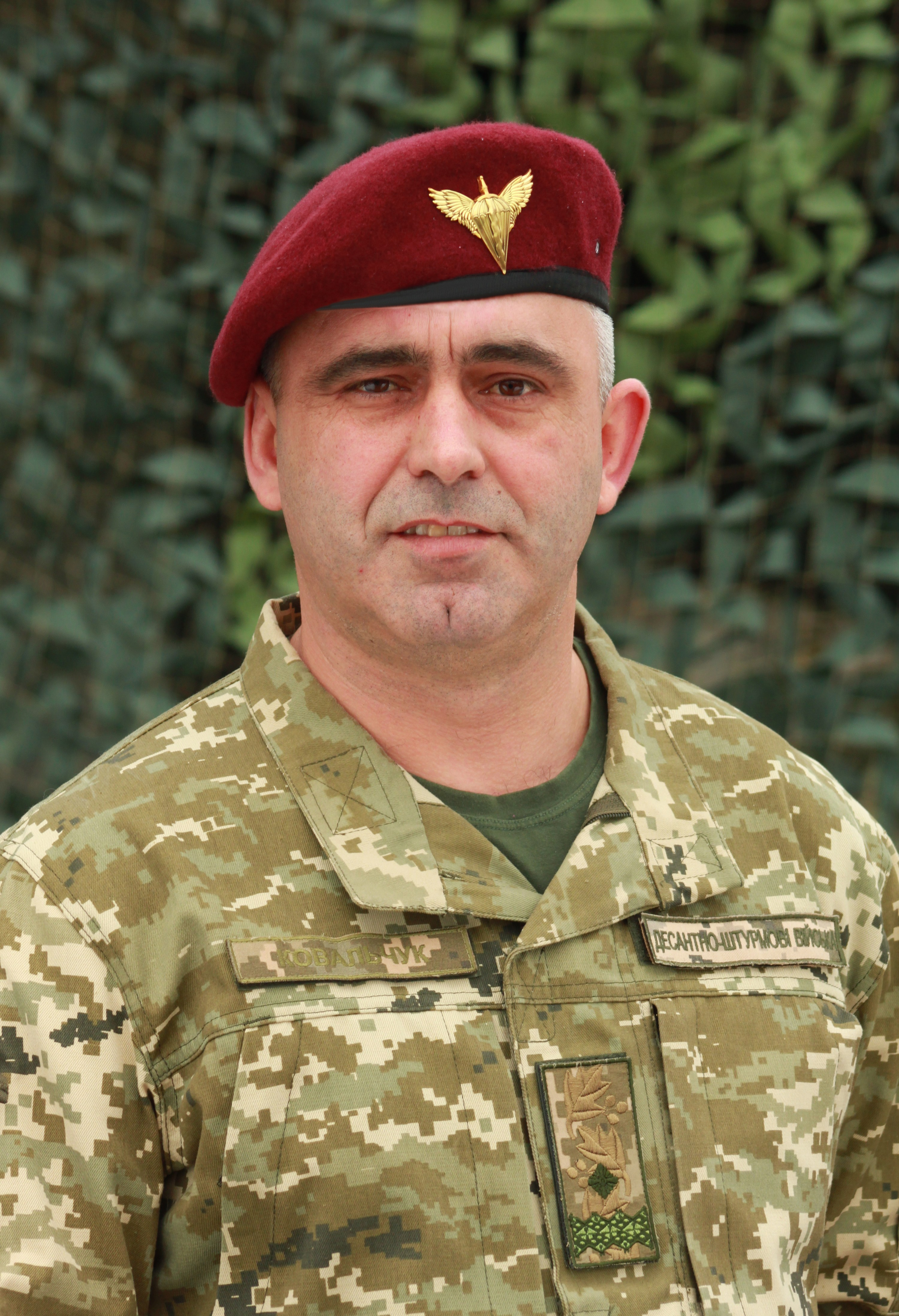
- Kovalchuk with the rank of brigadier-general in 2018
- Born: Andrii Trochymovych Kovalchuk; 28 February 1974 (age 52); Shchytyn, Ukrainian SSR, Soviet Union
- Military career
- Allegiance: Ukraine
- Branch: Ukrainian Ground Forces; Ukrainian Air Assault Forces
- Service years: 1997–present
- Rank: Major-General
- Conflicts: Russo-Ukrainian War; War in Donbas; Russian invasion of Ukraine; 2022 Kherson counteroffensive
- Awards: Hero of Ukraine; Cross of Military Merit (Ukraine); Order of Bohdan Khmelnytsky 2d class Order of Bohdan Khmelnytsky 3d class Order of Danylo Halytsky

Major-General Andrii Trokhymovych Kovalchuk (Ukrainian: Андрій Трохимович Ковальчук; born 28 April 1974) is a Ukrainian military officer. He graduated from a military academy in 1997 and joined the Ukrainian army. He served in Ukraine and on deployment as a peacekeeper to the United Nations missions in Kosovo, Liberia and the Côte d'Ivoire. During the war in Donbas from 2014 to 2022, Kovalchuk took part in successful operations to liberate settlements in Donetsk Oblast before assaulting the Luhansk International Airport. Despite being wounded he captured the airport and held it for almost two months. Kovalchuk afterwards served with airborne troops and recommended the replacement of their Soviet-style uniform. On 24 August 2016, the same day uniform reforms were implemented, he was awarded the title of Hero of Ukraine.

In 2018 Kovalchuk studied for a Master of Public Administration degree at the Ivan Chernyakhovsky National Defense University of Ukraine. He was recognised as the best graduating officer and received the Queen Elizabeth II of Great Britain sword in recognition. Since the Russian invasion of Ukraine in 2022, Kovalchuk has been commanding forces in the south of the country. He commanded the 2022 Ukrainian counteroffensive in the south before being dismissed for lack of progress. In 2024 he became the head of the Odesa Military Academy.

== Early life and career ==
Kovalchuk was born in the village of Shchytyn in Volyn Oblast in northwestern Ukraine, on 28 April 1974. He attended a mechanical engineering school at Kovel. Kovalchuk recalled having problems with discipline at the school, but escaped expulsion as he performed well academically.

At school Kovalchuk has aspired to become an officer in the Ukrainian Army. He attended the Kyiv Institute of Ground Forces in 1993 to train as an engineering officer. Kovalchuk decided against a career in engineering and in 1994 transferred to the Guards Higher Tank Command School at Kharkiv, from which he graduated with honours in 1997.

Kovalchuk served in the 51st Mechanised Division as a platoon commander before rising to become chief of staff of a battalion and then a regiment. He was afterwards appointed to command a brigade. In 2004 he attended the Ukrainian Academy of Defence, majoring in "combat application and management of the actions of units of the Ground Forces". Kovalchuk served on a United Nations Interim Administration Mission in Kosovo peacekeeping operation from 2005 to 2006, as deputy commander of the Ukrainian contingent. He served a second deployment in 2011 as chief of staff to a helicopter unit that served with the United Nations Mission in Liberia and the United Nations Operation in Côte d'Ivoire.

== War in Donbas ==
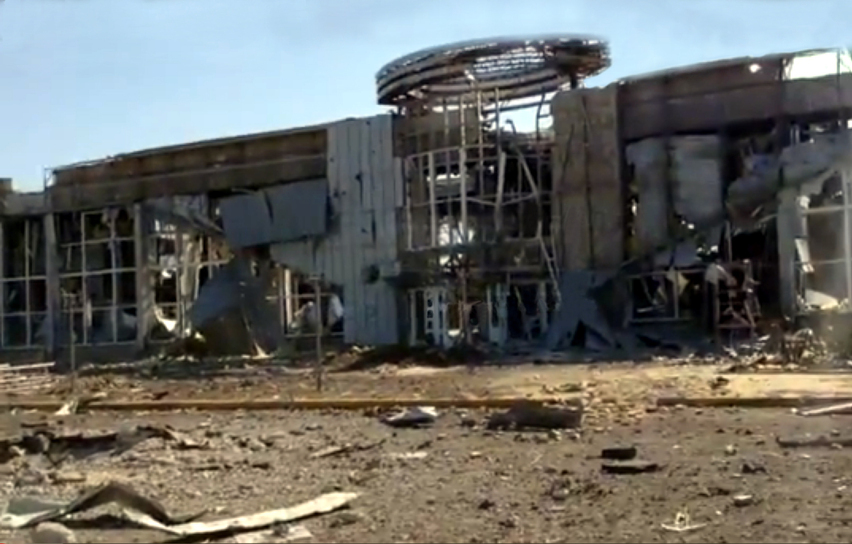
Luhansk airport, 4 September 2014

At the start of the Anti-terrorist Operation Zone operations against Russian-backed forces in Eastern Ukraine during the war in Donbas (2014–2022) he was chief of staff of the 80th Air Assault Brigade. His brigade liberated the settlements of Lyman, Mykolaivka and Sloviansk in the Donetsk Oblast. Kovalchuk then led part of the brigade on a march to Shchastya in Luhansk Oblast to go the relief of other Ukrainian troops. The combined force then pushed rebel troops from Luhansk International Airport. During this operation, on 13 July, Kovalchuk was wounded by rifle fire in the back and shoulder. He refused hospitalisation to continue to serve, commanding the defence of the airport from counterattacks. His units held the 13 kilometres (8.1 mi) perimeter until 31 August.

In August he was appointed to command the brigade and promoted to brigadier general. In March 2016 Kovalchuk was appointed chief of staff and deputy commander of the Highly Mobile Landing Forces (airborne units).

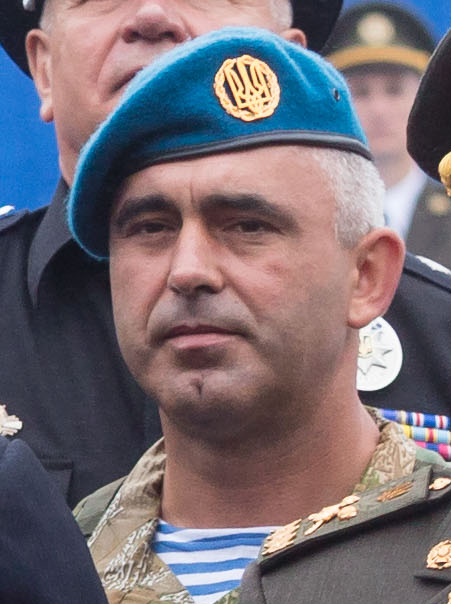
Wearing the Soviet-style paratrooper's uniform that he phased out, 2016

Kovalchuk was one of the instigators of the reform of uniforms of the Ukrainian Army, which was implemented on 24 August 2016. Changes made included the replacement of the blue beret for airborne troops, associated with the Soviet and Russian armies, with a red one. Kovalchuk, whose own uniform changed, said "I personally do not want to be in the same uniform as those scoundrels who attack me and my soldiers".

In 2018 Kovalchuk attended the Ivan Chernyakhovsky National Defense University of Ukraine. He attended part-time, with 50% of the material covered on a correspondence basis whilst he was deployed in combat. Kovalchuk was awarded a masters degree in public administration and received the sword of Queen Elizabeth II of Great Britain, awarded by the military attaché of the British Embassy since 1996 to the best graduating officer. In early October 2021 he was appointed to lead the army's Operational Command South with the rank of major-general.

== Russian invasion of Ukraine ==
Russia launched a large-scale invasion of Ukraine in February 2022. By August, Kovalchuk had control over Ukraine's six southern oblasts, including Kryvyi Rih Raion, Mykolaiv Oblast, and Kherson Oblast. His forces amounted to around 100,000 troops (when including territorial defense battalions).

By early August 2022, it was reported that Kovalchuk was preparing to command the Ukrainian counteroffensive in the Kherson region which began at the end of the same month. He was later dismissed from this position and replaced by Oleksandr Tarnavskyi, as the offensive was not progressing fast enough for the command in Kyiv.

On 11 April 2024, Kovalchuk was appointed head of the Odesa Military Academy.

== Awards ==
On 19 July 2014 Kovalchuk was awarded the third class Order of Bohdan Khmelnytsky.

On 10 October 2015 he received the second class of the Order of Bohdan Khmelnytsky for personal bravery.

On 23 August 2016 Kovalchuk was awarded the title of Hero of Ukraine by President Petro Poroshenko.

On 2 May 2022 he was awarded the Order of Danylo Halytsky.

On 27 July 2022 he received the Cross of Military Merit (Ukraine).

== Personal life ==
Kovalchuk's wife Olena is an airborne officer; they met when she chastised him, her senior, for wearing an unpolished belt buckle. The couple have two sons.

Military offices
Preceded by Dmytro Delyatytskyi	Director of the Odesa Military Academy; 2024–	Succeeded by Incumbent
Preceded by Ihor Palahnyuk	Commander of the Operational Command South; 2021–2024	Succeeded by Hennadii Shapovalov
Preceded by Ihor Lunyov	Chief of Staff and First Deputy Commander of the Ukrainian Air Assault Forces; 2016–2021	Succeeded by Artem Kotenko
Preceded by Viktor Kopachynskyi	Commander of the 80th Air Assault Brigade; 2014–2016	Succeeded by Volodymyr Shvorak
