= 16th Support Regiment (Ukraine) =

- 16-й окремий полк підтримки
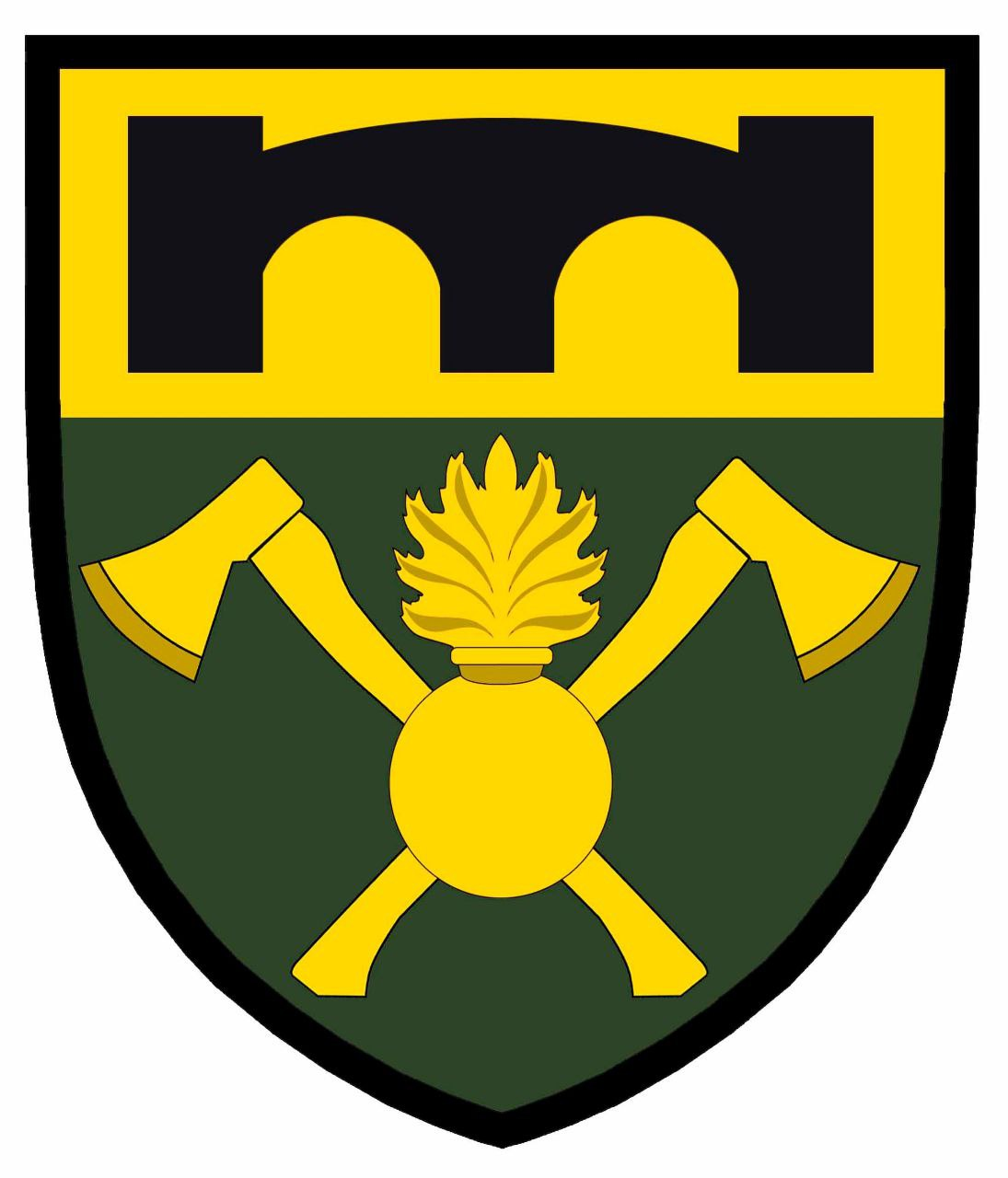
- Founded: 2018
- Country: Ukraine
- Branch: Ukrainian Ground Forces
- Type: Regiment
- Role: Engineering
- Part of: Operational Command South
- Garrison/HQ: Semenivka
- Engagements: Russo-Ukrainian War; War in Donbass; Russian invasion of Ukraine

The 16th Support Regiment (MUN A2558) is a regiment level military unit of the Ukrainian Support Forces, part of the Armed Forces of Ukraine's Operational Command South. It was established in 2018, but existed earlier as the engineering unit of the operational-tactical group "South". It is headquartered in Semenivka. It has seen combat during both, the War in Donbass and the Russian invasion of Ukraine.

== History ==
It was established on the basis of the 28th Mechanized Brigade in Semenivka as part of Operational Command South. In November 2016, the operational-tactical group "South" held engineering exercises involving GMZ-3 minelayers and TDA-M smokescreen makers. Further exercises in March 2017 also saw the use of RCBZ smokescreen makers. In 2018, headquarters building was being constructed for the Regiment and 4-story barracks, tankodrome, autodrome and other buildings were being constructed for the regiment. The regiment also started a recruitment campaign.

The regiment saw action during the War in Donbass. A serviceman of the regiment (Budnyk Oleg Vasilyevich) was killed in combat on 17 January 2019 by a landmine hitting his vehicle.

Following the Russian invasion of Ukraine, it saw combat. Since November 2022, the Regiment has been conducting demining operations in the Mykolaiv Oblast and Kherson Oblast and also participated in combat operations such as the Battle of Krynky. On 28 January 2024, a soldier of the regiment (Vovk Ihor) was killed during battles in Kozachi Laheri. A serviceman of the regiment (Andriy Olegovich Levytskyi) was killed in action on 24 December 2024 near Kizomys.

== Equipment ==
Model	Image	Origin	Type	Number	Details
Vehicles
GMZ-3		Soviet Union	Minelayer		
TDA-M		Soviet Union	Smokescreen		
IMR-2		Soviet Union	Heavy Combat engineering vehicle		

=== Commanders ===
- Colonel Kupchuk Oleksandr Ivanovych

== Structure ==
- Management and Headquarters
- 1st Engineering Battalion
- 2nd Engineering Battalion
- Personnel Department
- Engineering Structures Department
- Traffic Support Company
- Commandant Platoon

== Sources ==
- "Інженерні підрозділи ОТУ «Південь» готові до виконання завдань за призначенням". wartime.org.ua. Військова панорама. 2017-03-13. Archived from the original on 2017-09-23.
- "Українські сапери потренувалися боротися з ворожим морським десантом". 24tv.ua. 24 канал. 2016-12-05. Archived from the original on 16 January 2018.
- Підрозділи збройних сил поповнюються оновленою технікою РХБЗ
