= 409th Separate Rifle Battalion (Ukraine) =

409th Independent Rifle Battalion
- Country: Ukraine
- Allegiance: 22nd Mechanized Brigade
- Branch: Ukrainian Ground Forces
- Type: Infantry
- Engagements: Kursk campaign
- Website: https://www.facebook.com/osb409
- Commander: Andriy Pidlisny

The 409th Separate Rifle Battalion (409 SRB) is a military unit within the Land Forces of the Armed Forces of Ukraine. It forms part of the Operational Command South. The battalion was established in February 2023.

== History ==
In February 2024, the 110th Brigade published a post stating that the 409th Battalion had taken part in the defence of Avdiivka.

Since 6 August 2024, the battalion has been taking part in the Kursk campaign. The battalion held defensive positions in the area around Olgivka, Zhabolovka, Durovka and Vitryane.

== Command ==
- Major Andriy Pidlisny

== Symbols ==
The battalion's emblem features two golden rifles crossed on a blue field, beneath which a silver boat is depicted.

== Working with volunteers ==
In April 2024, the non-governmental organisation ‘Sprava Hromad’ and the Poroshenko Foundation donated specialist equipment, drones and charging stations to the unit.

In May 2024, the ‘Come Back Alive’ Charitable Foundation and the British historian and Oxford University professor Timothy Garton Ash presented the battalion's soldiers with drones and night-vision equipment.

== Commemoration ==
In April 2024, one of the streets in the village of Antonivka, in the Kherson Oblast, was renamed 409th Battalion Street.
