= Ihor Fedorov =

Ukrainian general

- Ігор Васильович Федоров
- Born: Ihor Vasylovych Fedorov; 8 June 1954 (age 72); Ishkiv, Ukraine, Soviet Union
- Military career
- Allegiance: Soviet Union; Ukraine
- Branch: Ukrainian Ground Forces
- Rank: Major general
- Commands: Operational Command South (2012, acting)

Major General Ihor Vasylovych Fedorov (Ukrainian: Ігор Васильович Федоров; born on 8 June 1954), is a Ukrainian soldier, who is the First Deputy Chief of Staff of the Land Forces of the Armed Forces of Ukraine. Fedorov had been the Chief of Staff – first deputy commander of the Operational Command South, and had been the acting commander of the military district in 2012.

He had been the Chief of Staff – first deputy commander of the troops of the Southern Military District, the Chief Operational Duty Officer, and has been the Deputy Chief of the Main Command Center of the Armed Forces of Ukraine.

== Biography ==
Ihor Fedorov was born on 8 June 1954 in the village of Ishkiv, now Ternopil District, Ternopil Oblast to his father, Vasyl Okesiyovych (1925-1976) and his mother, Yevheniya Mykolaivna (1925-1988).

In 1972, he graduated from the Kyiv Suvorov School. In 1976, he graduated from the Kyiv higher military command school named after M. V. Frunze. He graduated from the Military Academy named after M. Frunze in 1989.

He served as a tank and mechanized platoon commander in the Kyiv Military District, and the Leningrad Military District.

He was the commander of the commandant's company of the Leningrad Military District. The chief of staff is the deputy commander of the motorized rifle battalion, the staff commander of the motorized rifle battalion. He was the head of the operational department as he became the deputy chief of staff, and later the commander of the motorized rifle regiment of the Carpathian Military District.

In January 1992, he joined in the Armed Forces of Ukraine.

In that same year, he was the commander of the regiment. In 1994, he was the chief of staff – the first deputy commander of the tank division of the Operational Command North.

He graduated from the Academy of the Armed Forces of Ukraine in 1999.

On 3 June 1999, he became the Chief of Staff, First Deputy Chief of the Main Department of Combat Training of the Ground Forces Command of the Armed Forces of Ukraine. In August 2006, he became the first deputy chief of staff of the Ground Forces of the Armed Forces of Ukraine.

He later became the Chief of Staff – first deputy commander of the Operational Command South. Fedorov became the acting commander of Operational Command South in 2012. He was replaced by Anatoliy Sirotenko on 2 July.

== Family ==
He is married to Halyna Hryhorivna and has a son and three daughters.
