= Ihor Herasymenko =

Ukrainian politician and military commander

- Ігор Герасименко
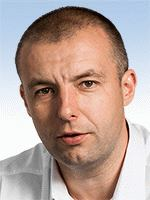
- Official portrait, 2019

People's Deputy of Ukraine
- Incumbent
- Assumed office 29 August 2019
- Preceded by: Boryslav Rozenblat
- Constituency: Zhytomyr Oblast, No. 62

Personal details
- Born: 5 January 1984 (age 42) Radomyshl, Ukrainian SSR, Soviet Union (now Ukraine)
- Party: Servant of the People
- Other political affiliations: Independent
- Education: Odesa Military Academy; Ivan Chernyakhovsky National Defense University of Ukraine
- Awards: Hero of Ukraine

Military service
- Allegiance: Ukraine
- Branch/service: Ukrainian Air Assault Forces
- Years of service: 2005–2017
- Rank: Major
- Commands: 95th Air Assault Brigade; 81st Airmobile Brigade
- Battles/wars: Russo-Ukrainian War; War in Donbas; Siege of Sloviansk

Ihor Leonidovych Herasymenko (Ukrainian: І́гор Леоні́дович Герасиме́нко; born 5 January 1984) is a Ukrainian politician and military commander currently serving as a People's Deputy of Ukraine from Ukraine's 62nd electoral district since 29 August 2019. As commander of the 95th Air Assault Brigade and 81st Airmobile Brigade, Herasymenko participated in several battles during the war in Donbas, including the Siege of Sloviansk, for which he was awarded the title of Hero of Ukraine. As of 2022, he is one of three serving People's Deputies to hold the title, along with Yuriy Boyko and Mykhailo Zabrodskyi.

== Early life and career ==
Ihor Leonidovych Herasymenko was born on 5 January 1984 in Radomyshl. From 2001 to 2005, he studied at the Odesa Military Academy, graduating from the academy's airmobile faculty with a specialisation in combat applications and action control of airmobile units. Following his graduation, he was appointed as commander of the reconnaissance brigade of the 95th Air Assault Brigade. He also graduated from the Ivan Chernyakhovsky National Defense University of Ukraine.

== War in Donbas ==
After the outbreak of the war in Donbas, Herasymenko joined combat on the side of Ukraine in April 2014, and was promoted to battalion commander from his previous position of company commander. Herasymenko was twice wounded in combat, but remained in service.

On 26 May 2014, Herasymenko's unit was attacked by separatist forces at a checkpoint, but successfully repelled them. Herasymenko also led the recapture of Mount Karachun by Ukrainian forces during the Siege of Sloviansk, for which he was awarded the title of Hero of Ukraine by President Petro Poroshenko.

A stele dedicated to Herasymenko has been erected at the National Defense University of Ukraine. He retired from the military in 2017, and founded the Alliance of Combatants non-governmental organisation in 2018.

== Political career ==
Herasymenko ran in the 2019 Ukrainian parliamentary election as a People's Deputy of Ukraine from Ukraine's 62nd electoral district, representing Servant of the People. At the time of his election, he was an independent. He won the election with 47.72% of the vote and became a People's Deputy. As of 2022 he is one of three People's Deputies to hold the title of Hero of Ukraine, along with Mykhailo Zabrodskyi (for actions during the war in Donbas) and Yuriy Boyko (for his role in the Ukrainian fuel industry).

Herasymenko is a member of the Verkhovna Rada Committee on National Security, Defence, and Intelligence.
