= Logistics Forces of the Armed Forces of Ukraine =

- Сили логістики Збройних Сил України
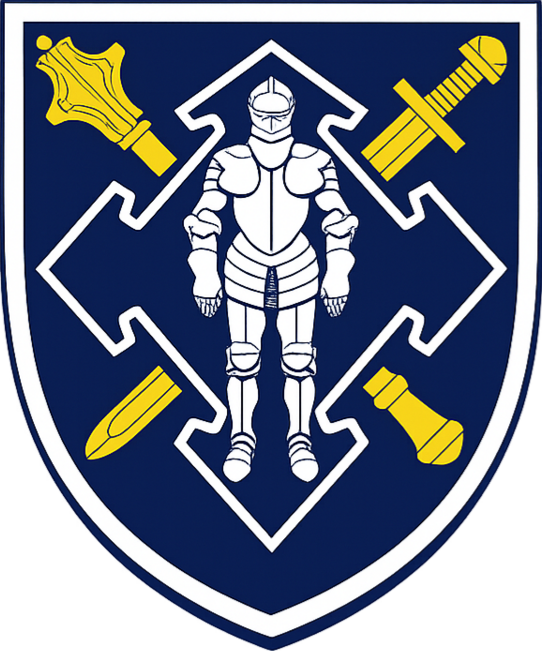
- Insignia of the Logistics Forces Command
- Active: 22 February 2018
- Country: Ukraine
- Allegiance: Armed Forces of Ukraine
- Type: Military branch
- Role: Logistics
- Garrison/HQ: Kyiv
- Engagements: Russo-Ukrainian war

Commanders
- Current commander: TBA

Insignia
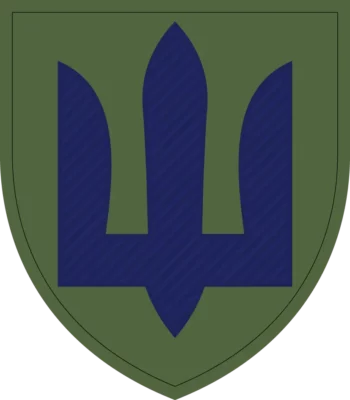
- Shoulder sleeve insignia

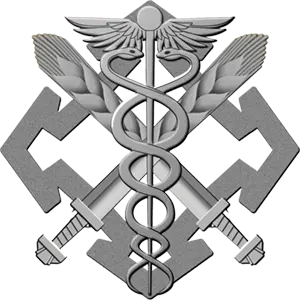
- Beret insignia

The Logistics Forces of the Armed Forces of Ukraine are a separate branch of the AFU, responsible for the technical and logistical support and storage of the entire range of weapons, ammunition, military equipment, and food.

== History ==
Four years after the start of the Russo-Ukrainian war, in the spring of 2018, in accordance with the Decree of the President of Ukraine No. 39/2018, dated 22 February 2018, the Logistics Command of the Armed Forces of Ukraine was created within the structure of the Armed Forces, which united its logistics and armament services.

From 3 to 13 June 2019, members of the Logistics Forces Command participated in NATO's largest international logistics exercise "Capable Logistician 2019" , which was held in Poland. On 31 August 2019, the NATO Consultation, Command and Control Agency added Ukraine to the list of countries using NATO standard LOGFAS software.

It was planned create the Logistics Forces Command as a single structure by the end of 2020. The plan was to deploy separate logistics brigades for individual operational commands, which would include existing automobile battalions, material support battalions, and repair units. The plan also included the integration of the Logistics Forces Command into the General Staff of the Ukrainian Armed Forces, thereby fully fulfilling the vision of the defense reforms to merge the units and subdivisions of the Armed Forces Rear and the Armed Forces Armament.

On 1 January 2022, the Logistics Forces received the status of a separate branch of AFU.

On 29 February 2024 Volodymyr Karpenko was appointed commander of the Logistics Forces, replacing Oleh Hulyak. He was relieved of his duties on 29 July 2026.

== Structure ==
Logistics Forces of the Armed Forces of Ukraine

Logistics Forces Command
  - Armament of the Armed Forces of Ukraine
    - Central Armored Directorate
    - Central Automobile Directorate
    - Central Missile and Artillery Directorate
    - Department of Metrology and Standardization
    - 63rd Repair Base
  - Rear of the Armed Forces of Ukraine
    - Central Food Supply Directorate
    - Central Fuel and Lubricants Provision Directorate
    - Central Material Provision Directorate
    - Central Military Signals Directorate
    - 20th Repair Center
    - 25th Logistics Regiment
    - 46th Joint Support Center
    - 55th Automobile Battalion
    - 67th Control Point
    - 104th Automobile Brigade
    - 124th Support Center
    - 229th Joint Support Center
    - 230th Storage Base
    - 531st Storage Base
    - 1899th Central Base
    - 3057th Central Base

== Leadership ==
- Lieutenant general Oleh Vyshnivsky (2019—2021)
- Major General Oleh Hulyak (2021—2024)
- Major General Volodymyr Karpenko (2024—2026)

== See also ==
- Support Forces of the Armed Forces of Ukraine
- Medical Forces of the Armed Forces of Ukraine
