= Volodymyr Mozharovsky =

Ukrainian politician and former army officer

- Володимир Миколайович Можаровський
- Born: Volodymyr Mykolayovych Mozharovsky; 17 September 1952 (age 74); Bosuvny, Ukrainian SSR, Soviet Union
- Military career
- Allegiance: Soviet Union; Ukraine
- Branch: Ukrainian Ground Forces
- Rank: Colonel general
- Commands: Operational Command South (2001-2003)
- Conflicts: Soviet-Afghan War

Volodymyr Mykolayovych Mozharovsky (Ukrainian: Володимир Миколайович Можаровський; born on 17 September 1952), is a Ukrainian politician and former army officer who reached the rank of colonel general and served as the First Deputy Minister of Defense of Ukraine from 2010 to 2012.

Mozharovksy was the commander of the Operational Command South from 2001 to 2004, and the commander of the United Operational Command of the Armed Forces of Ukraine from 2007 to 2010.

== Biography ==
Volodymyr Mozharovsky was born on 17 September 1952 in the village of Bosuvny, Luhyny Raion, Zhytomyr Oblast. In 1973, he graduated with honors from the Leningrad Higher Military Command School. At the same year, he was the commander of a motor rifle platoon in the Leningrad Military District. From 1974 to 1985, he served in the positions of commander of a reconnaissance platoon, commander of a company of cadets of the Leningrad Higher Military Command School, and a commander of a motor rifle battalion. From 1985 to 1987, he served as part of the 40th Army in Afghanistan during the Soviet–Afghan War.

From 1987 to 1991, Mozharovsky was the chief of staff and deputy commander of a motor rifle regiment. In 1991, he graduated from the correspondence faculty of the Frunze Military Academy with a gold medal. With the dissolution of the Soviet Union in December 1991, Mozharovsky joined the Armed Forces of Ukraine in 1992. From 1992 to 1996, he was the chief of staff and deputy commander of a motor rifle division and commander of a mechanized division. Between 1996 and 2000, he was the deputy commander of an army corps, and then commander of an army corps. In 1998, he graduated from the operational and strategic faculty of the Academy of the Armed Forces of Ukraine as an external student.

From 2000 to 2001, Mozharovsky served as first deputy commander of the Ukrainian Ground Forces. On 19 December 2001, Mozharovky became the commander of the forces of the Southern Operational Command. In 2004, he became chief of staff and first deputy commander of the Northern Operational Command. From 2005 to 2007, he was chief of staff and first deputy commander of the Ukrainian Ground Forces. On 7 November 2007 he became the commander of the United Operational Command of the Armed Forces of Ukraine. From January between August 2010, he was the first deputy chief of the General Staff of the Ukrainian Armed Forces. On 18 February 2010, Mozharovsky became the first deputy minister of defense.

On 22 February 2011, when asked about whether Ukrainian fighter jets were involved at the Libyan Civil War, Mozharosky stated, "I categorically deny, I immediately want to tell you (this information) and I want to inform you that there is not a single military pilot on the territory of this state and not a single military plane of ours either."

On 15 March 2011, Mozharosky was dismissed from military service for health reasons. On 18 February 2012, he was demoted to Deputy Minister of Defense - chief of staff. On 5 March 2014, Mozharovksy was then dismissed as Deputy Minister of Defense of Ukraine - chief of staff at his own request.
