= Ihor Hordiichuk =

Ukrainian military officer (born 1972)

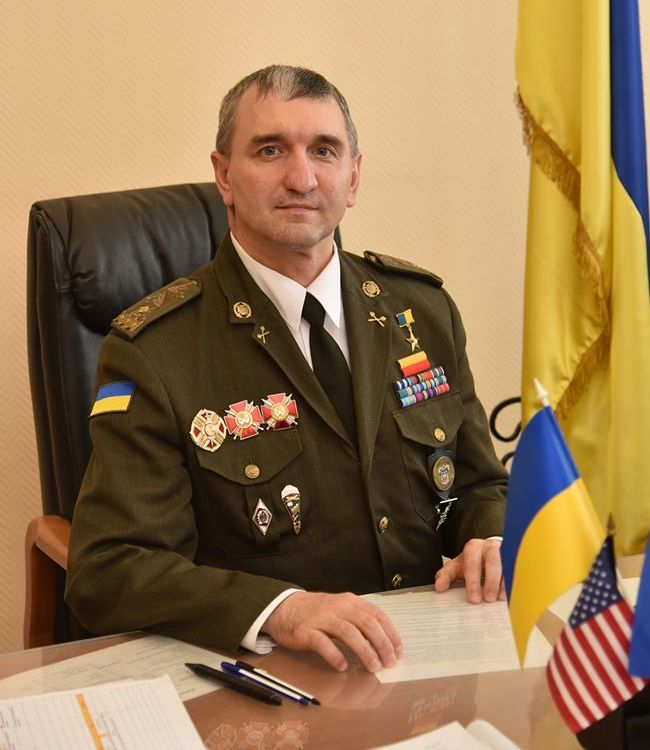
- Hordiichuk in 2019
- Born: 12 November 1972 (age 53); Zaliznytsia, Korets Raion, Rivne Oblast, Ukrainian SSR, Soviet Union (now Ukraine)
- Education: National Defence University of Ukraine; United States Army War College; Hetman Petro Sahaidachnyi National Ground Forces Academy
- Spouse: Tetiana Hordiichuk (m. 1994)
- Military career
- Allegiance: Ukraine
- Branch: Ukrainian Ground Forces
- Service years: 1991–present
- Rank: Major General
- Nicknames: Sumrak; Gordey
- Unit: International Security Assistance Force
- Commands: 8th Special Forces Regiment; Ivan Bohun Military High School; National Defence University of Ukraine
- Conflicts: Russo-Ukrainian war; War in Donbas; Battle in Shakhtarsk Raion; Battle of Ilovaisk (WIA)

Ihor Volodymyrovych Hordiichuk (Ukrainian: І́гор Володи́мирович Гордійчу́к; born 12 November 1972) is a Ukrainian military officer who is awarded the Hero of Ukraine and Order of Bohdan Khmelnytsky in 2014. He is also known by his nickname Sumrak or Gordey. Hordiichuk gained notoriety in August 2014 when, for 12 days, he commanded special troops and, accompanied by his scouts, he successfully repelled several Russian attacks from Savur-Mohyla in Donetsk Oblast.

== Education ==
Born on 12 November 1972, in the village of Zaliznytsia in Rivne region of Ukraine. Hordiichuk attended the Omsk Higher Tank Engineering School from 1989 to 1991, and graduated from the Hetman Petro Sahaidachnyi National Ground Forces Academy in 1994. He completed four months of classes in Canada to meet the STANAG 6001 (2008) level for minimal English proficiency for personnel. At the College of the United States Army in Carlisle, he further enhanced his military understanding. He received an honors diploma from the United States Army War College in 2008, and the National Defense Academy of Ukraine in 2002.

== Military career ==
After graduating in 1994, Hordiichuk began his military service in the Khmelnytsky region's city of Iziaslav with the 161st Mechanized Brigade of the Ukrainian Armed Forces. He held several positions in the mechanized forces: deputy commander of a mechanized battalion, commander of a separate tank battalion, commander of a tank line battalion, reconnaissance platoon, and mechanized company.

Captain Hordiichuk first served as the deputy commander of a brigade in 2002, and then as the commander of the 8th Special Forces Regiment from 2003 to 2008. He was part of the multinational contingent stationed in the Afghanistan from May to December 2010. He worked in the General Staff of the Ukrainian Armed Forces and in Defense Intelligence in April 2014.

=== Battle in Shakhtarsk Raion ===
Throughout the war in Donbas, Colonel Hordiichuk participated in several operations inside the ATO zone. Leading a Special Forces unit, he oversaw the capture of the Savur-Mohyla strategic point while carrying out operations in the enemy's rear. Following the capture of the hill and the installation of the observation station, Russian artillery spotters completely shut off all Ukrainian military transportation in the "D" sector.

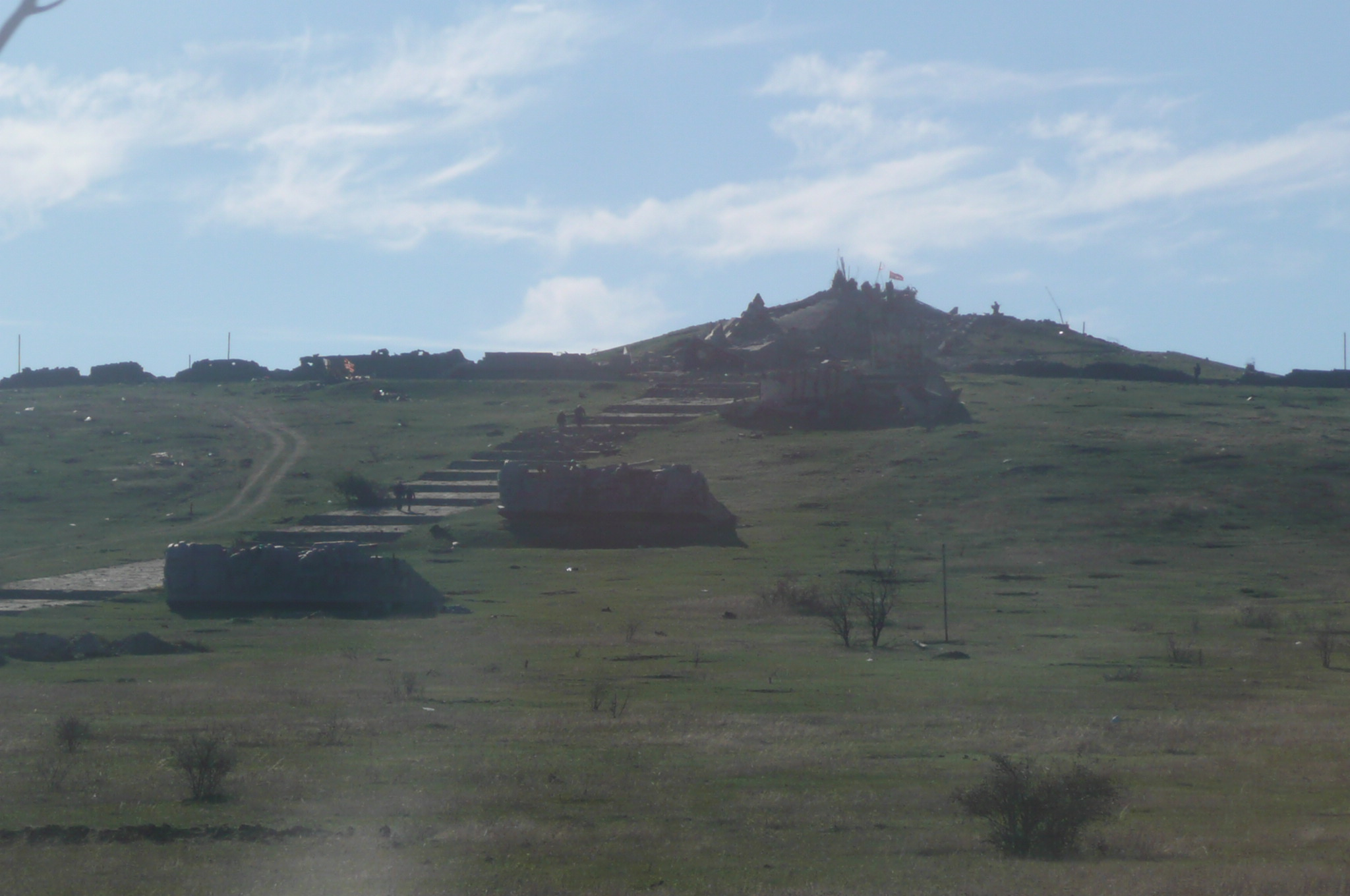
Ruins on the Savur-Mohyla in 2014

On 12 August 2014, the 14-man scout group Krym of Hordiichuk broke into the hill's positions, gained possession of the hilltop observation post, and started carrying out combat duties including as spotting artillery fire. Russian tanks, separatists, and artillery were used in large quantities to defeat the Ukrainian unit. Due to enemy artillery attacks, communication channels were rendered inoperable. While communication was not very effective, cell phone communication was feasible in certain parts of the hill.

Heavy artillery was directing its concentrated fire towards the Hordiichuk's group. Almost every day, the enemy's soldiers attempted to storm the hill. Although the scouts' lives were spared by bunkers, they suffered serious contusions from explosions that left the military crippled. Hordiichuk himself was also often scolded, yet he remained in his role. There were generally only firearms and grenade launchers available, although occasionally artillery assistance was used to repel day attacks. Six attempts were made by separatists to take Savur-Mohyla by night. The defenders of the hill survived many close-quarters assaults.

Colonel Peter Potekhin led a party of volunteer reconnaissance officers that came to assist on 18 August. The 25th Airborne Brigade consists of these seven soldiers. Colonel Hordiichuk received assistance from a number of additional volunteers who joined the group. These included combatants from the 4th Company of the 42nd Territorial Defence Battalion in the Kirovohrad Oblast, who were commanded by Lieutenant Colonel O. Melnychenko, artillery adjusters, infantry fighting vehicles from the 28th Mechanized Brigade, and armoured personnel carrier from the 3rd Separate Special Purpose Regiment arrived with brand-new communication apparatus.

Following the arrival of the reinforcement, Hordiichuk rotated; the Krym group withdrew. With his hand injured, he remained on the hill, carried out combat duties, and kept the enemy informed of his whereabouts. The order to leave the hill was received on the evening of 24 August. By then, it was evident that the hill was surrounded tightly. Russian separatists rendered inoperable the vehicle of the 3rd Separate Special Purpose Regiment, which had broken through it to transfer the injured personnel.

Hordiichuk issued the order to leave Savur-Mohyla at night of 25 August. After 12 days and nights of nonstop fighting, the Ukrainian scouts departed from the hill that had been excavated by shells. They were able to sneak around 60 kilometres (37 mi) past the enemy's line and join Ukrainian forces close to Mnohopillia. Scouts set out to make a breakthrough in an attempt to escape the encirclement on 29 August, accompanied by all forces from Ukraine.

When Hordiichuk and Sergeant Serhii Stehar were moving on the truck, artillery and mortar fire started, causing a body explosion and setting the automobile on fire. The escorts were unable to approach because of the enemy's heavy fire; Hordiichuk managed to escape on his own. Without a helmet, a bullet fragment ripped a chunk of bone from his skull on the back of his head, injuring him. After ripping off the bandage and attempting to lead the battle, the colonel passed out from blood loss. Russian paratroopers seized Hordiichuk, Stegar, and numerous more combatants. He was left behind when the detainees were hauled away, and it was forbidden to assist him because they said he would die very soon. After lying on the battlefield for two days, he was discovered by Red Cross workers, who took him immediately to the Mechnikov Clinical Regional Hospital.

=== Rehabilitation ===
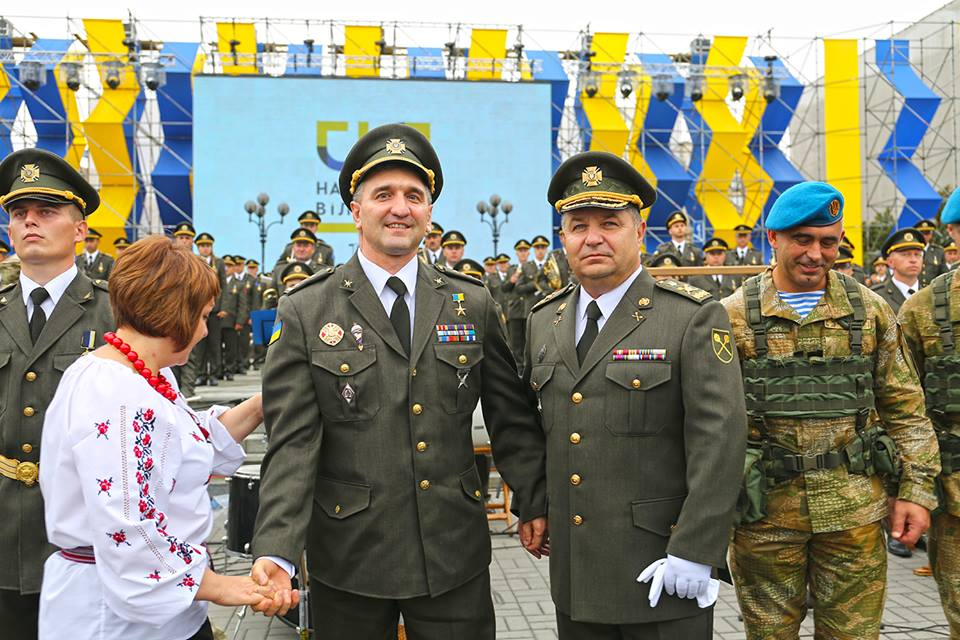
Hordiichuk and Andrii Kovalchuk in 2016

Colonel Hordiichuk, paralyzed and suffering from the worst kind of traumatic brain injury, was brought unconscious to the Mechnikov Clinical Regional Hospital in Dnipro and subsequently to the National Military Medical Clinical Center in Kyiv. A horrific head wound not only caused paralysis (hemiparesis) but also a blood infection (sepsis). He suffered from a dangerously elevated body temperature for several weeks, which was only alleviated by being placed in a medical coma and not by medication.

Hordiichuk regained consciousness, but his left arm and leg were totally paralyzed, and he lost control of his body. At the Walter Reed National Military Medical Center in the United States, Colonel Hordiichuk received the expert care he sorely needed. Here, he learnt to move again despite the excruciating pain under the tight supervision of qualified rehabilitation specialists. Although the American rehabilitation program was successful, complete healing remained a long way off.

Hordiichuk had many operations and therapy in the United States and Ukraine after the injury. His recuperation was aided by the expert work of American rehabilitologists at first, and currently by specialists from the Institute of Vertebrology and Rehabilitation's Kyiv Center for Strengthening the Spine and Joints. His family had to deal with the challenge of carrying out the challenging reconstruction process once they returned to Ukraine. There are no dedicated veteran's rehabilitation programs in Ukraine, so his only option was to attend classes at sanatoriums and public hospitals. Experts offered their services at no cost to assist him in living a full life again.

=== Later career ===
Colonel Hordiichuk successfully completed all of the tests of luck, undertook a number of difficult and protracted treatment courses, and in April 2016, he rejoined the ranks. Furthermore, as per the directive from the Minister of Defense Stepan Poltorak, he was named Ivan Bohun Military High School during his recuperation. Hordiichuk would be in charge of the high school from 26 April 2016 to 3 October 2023. His dismissal was referred to as treason and disrespect on the online community in response to this decision. On 7 November, he was moved to the position of deputy head of the National Defence University of Ukraine. He held a private conversation with Ukrainian Defense Minister Rustem Umierov during their meeting.

In a 2018 interview, Hordiichuk stated that his primary adversaries are deceit, bribery, and corruption in addition to being set an example for and eliminating the traditional ways. A statue honoring Russian commander Alexander Suvorov was taken down from the courtyard of the Ivan Bohun Military High School in January 2019 at the behest of the institution's chief, Major General Hordiichuk, and the cadet community. He became the director general of the National Museum of the Revolution of Dignity (Maidan Museum). He stated in a 2023 interview:

I am proud to have been one of the few officers who convinced everyone in uniform, the Armed Forces, that we should be with the people. We realized that this was a difficult path, but we had no alternative. If there had been no Maidan, I am not sure if we would have been able to survive. We are grateful to our military, they are doing the hardest work – the victory depends on the girls and boys on the front line

— Ihor Hordiichuk, Maidan Museum

== Advocacy ==
Hordiichuk advocates for gender parity in the armed forces. He claims that his female pupils are extremely driven and serving as role models for others. Like all military personnel, he values discipline. In his opinion, winning the Russo-Ukrainian war requires a comprehensive strategy. It is imperative to have a robust army, as well as information resistance, a thriving economy, and the preservation of Ukrainian language and culture. He claims that this is being done to make sure that the nation's integrity won't be compromised by the adversary.

== Personal life ==
Hordiichuk refers to his mother Sofia Rodionivna as a rule intelligentsia, who enjoyed such power among her fellow peasants that she presided over them for more than 30 years. Volodymyr Oleksandrovych is his father. Inspired by his uncle, his mother's brother, he began dreaming of a military career as a future Hero of Ukraine from an early age. A professional soldier, he visited his sister annually and inspired his nephew to enlist in the military with his life experiences.

He married Tetiana Hordiichuk after becoming a lieutenant on 9 May 1994, and saw the birth of his daughter Martha two years later. Tetiana Hordiichuk, a senior soldier, is employed with the General Staff in the communication division. Martha, the daughter, is a student at the Taras Shevchenko National University of Kyiv studying English and Spanish in Western European Philology.

== Honours and awards ==
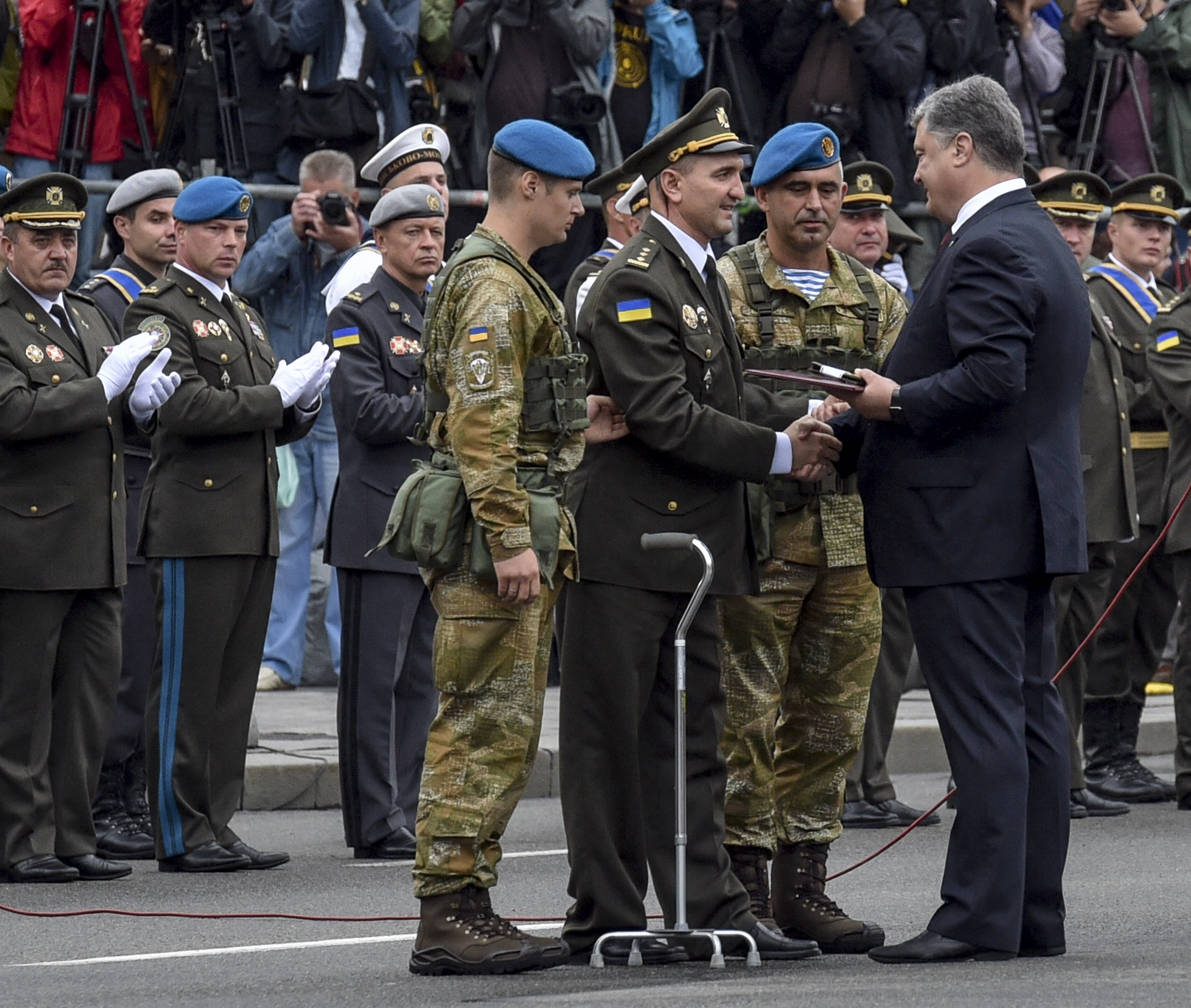
President Petro Poroshenko presenting Hordiichuk with the Major General shoulder insignia in 2016

Colonel Hordiichuk was granted the title of Hero of Ukraine of the Golden Star on 21 October 2014, as per a decree issued by the President of Ukraine. This was in recognition of his extraordinary bravery and heroism in safeguarding the territorial integrity and state sovereignty of Ukraine, as well as his fidelity to the oath of allegiance. The military title of Major general was conferred to him on 23 August 2016. The next day, at the parade on Khreshchatyk celebrating Ukraine's 25th anniversary of independence, President Petro Poroshenko gave the major general shoulder marks.

Bobanych has received honours and recognitions such as:

- Hero of Ukraine Order of the Gold Star (21 October 2014)
- Order of Bohdan Khmelnytsky Second Class (29 September 2014)
- Order of Bohdan Khmelnytsky Third Class (8 September 2014)
- Dignity and Honour Commendation
- 10 Years of Armed Forces Medal
- 15 Years of Armed Forces Medal
- Wound Medal (29 August 2019)
- Warrior-Peacemaker Badge
- Honorary Citizen of the Khmelnytskyi (20 September 2017)
- Order of Merit in the Fight against Fascism in Russia (22 June 2017)
