= 7th Communications Regiment (Ukraine) =

- 7-й окремий полк зв'язку
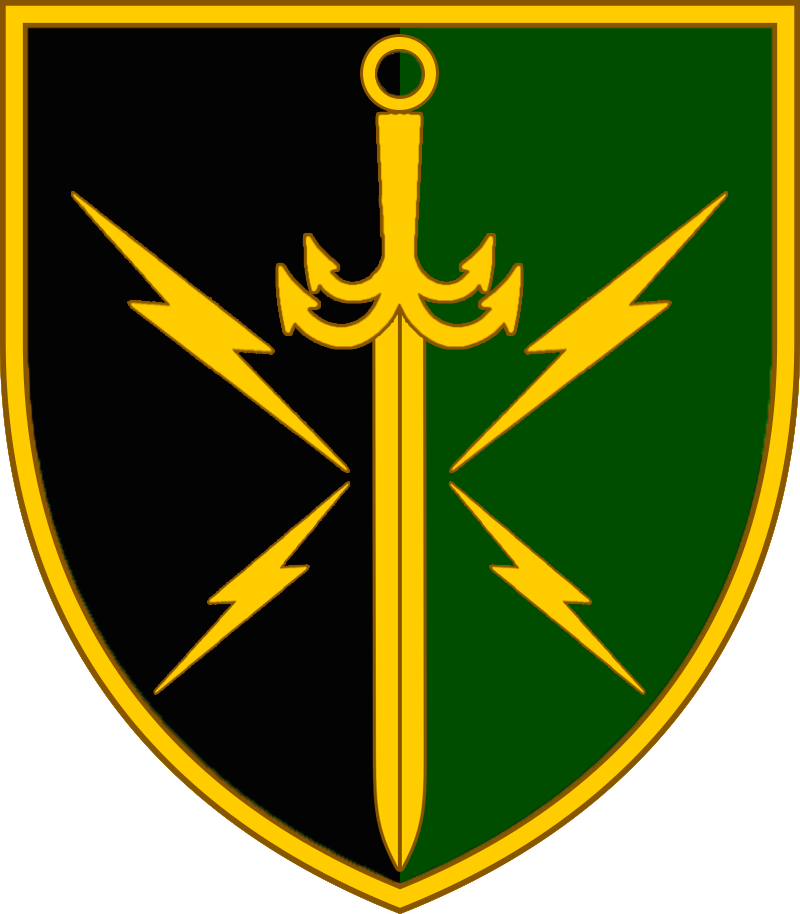
- Regiment insignia
- Founded: 2015
- Country: Ukraine
- Allegiance: Ministry of Defence
- Branch: Ukrainian Ground Forces
- Type: Regiment
- Role: Communications
- Garrison/HQ: Odesa
- Motto(s): "Timeliness, stability, mobility"
- Engagements: Russo-Ukrainian War; War in Donbass; Russian invasion of Ukraine

The 7th Separate Communications Regiment (MUN A3783) is a regiment level signal and communication unit of the Ground Forces of Ukraine, operationally under the command of Operational Command South. It was established on 7 May 2015 and has since then taken part in both the War in Donbass and the Russian invasion of Ukraine.

== History ==
The unit was established on 7 May 2015, as a field communications unit and managed to distinguish itself in the ATO zone, armed primarily with the R-145BM and R-414 vehicles. On 29 July 2016, it was reorganized into a separate communications regiment, headquartered in Odesa as part of Operational Command South.

Following the Russian invasion of Ukraine, it saw combat. A soldier of the regiment (Kljuchov Jaroslav Vitalijovych) was killed in action on 9 January 2023 during the Battle of Bakhmut. The regiment also received volunteer assistance for its operations. On 25 December 2024, a soldier of the regiment (Shvets' Kostjantyn) died in a road accident.

== Commanders ==
- Lieutenant Colonel Didur Anatoliy Volodymyrovych (2017)

== Structure ==
The structure of the regiment is as follows:

- Management & Headquarters
- 1st Signal Battalion
- 2nd Signal Battalion
- Rifle Battalion
- Radio relay Battalion
- Mobile Communications Battalion
- Material support Company
- Logistical Support Company
- Repair Company
- Commandant Platoon
