= Hennadii Shapovalov =

Ukrainian major general (born 1978)

- Геннадій Шаповалов
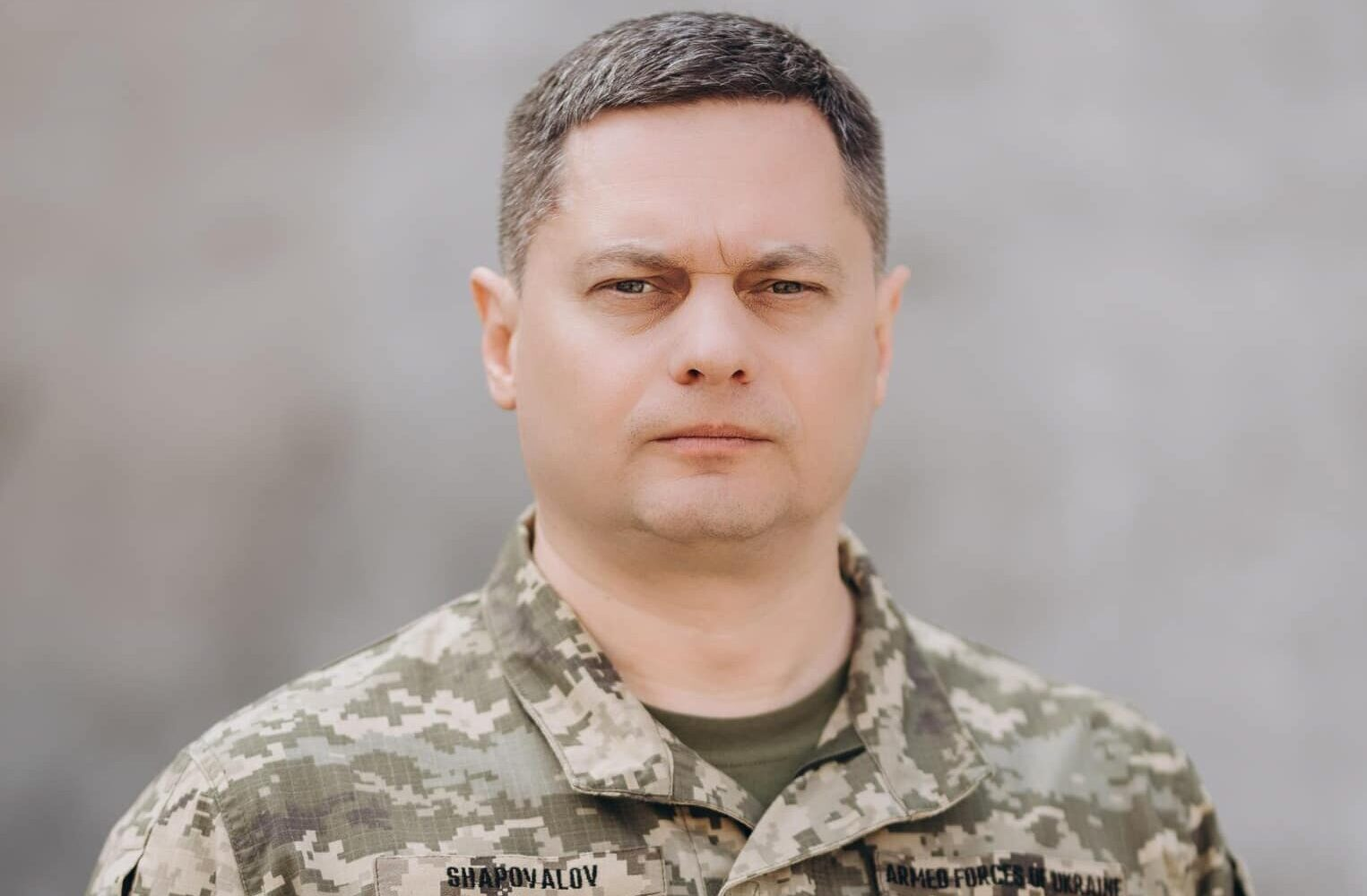
- Shapovalov in 2025
- Born: 1978 (age 47–48); Kirovohrad Oblast, Ukrainian SSR, Soviet Union
- Education: Kharkiv Polytechnic Institute; National Defence University of Ukraine; National University of Ostroh Academy; United States Army War College
- Military career
- Allegiance: Ukraine
- Branch: Ukrainian Ground Forces
- Service years: 2000–present
- Rank: Major General
- Commands: Commander of the Ukrainian Ground Forces; Operational Command South
- Conflicts: Russo-Ukrainian war

Hennadii Mykolayovych Shapovalov (Ukrainian: Геннадій Миколайович Шаповалов; born 1978) is a Ukrainian Ground Forces major general who is the Commander of the Ukrainian Ground Forces from 19 June 2025. He served as the commander of the Operational Command South from 16 April 2024 to 4 February 2025.

== Biography ==
Shapovalov was born in Kirovohrad Oblast in 1978.

In 2000, he graduated from the Institute of Tank Troops of the Kharkiv State Polytechnic University. In 2012, he graduated from the Command and Staff Institute of the Use of Troops (Forces) of the National Defense University of Ukraine, and National University of Ostroh Academy majoring in "International Relations, Public Communications and Regional Studies" (both with honors), as well as the US Army War College.

He went through all levels of military service, from the commander of a tank platoon to the commander of the 59th Separate Motorized Infantry Brigade named after Yakiv Handziuk.

In 2022, he was the head of the Main Department of Military Cooperation of the Armed Forces of Ukraine.

On 20 June 2023, he became a member of the Commission on Coordination of Euro-Atlantic Integration of Ukraine.

On 16 April 2024, Shapovalov was appointed commander of the forces of the Operational Command South.

On 4 February 2025, he resigned his command after being appointed by President Volodymyr Zelenskyy to serve as a liaison in the NATO military aid coordination center for Ukraine based in Wiesbaden, Germany.

On 30 September 2025, President Zelenskyy promoted Shapovalov from brigadier general to major general.
