= Anatoliy Syrotenko =

Ukrainian military commander

- Анатолій Миколайович Сиротенко
- Born: Anatoliy Mykolayovych Syrotenko; 4 March 1960 (age 66); Natalyne, Ukraine, Soviet Union
- Education: Academy of the Armed Forces of Ukraine
- Military career
- Allegiance: Soviet Union; Ukraine
- Branch: Ukrainian Ground Forces
- Service years: 1981-
- Rank: Lieutenant general
- Commands: Operational Command South (2012-2016); National Defense University of Ukraine (2017–2022)
- War in Donbass: Russo-Ukrainian War

Lieutenant General Anatoliy Mykolayovych Syrotenko (Ukrainian: Анатолій Миколайович Сиротенко; born on 4 March 1960), is a Ukrainian military commander, who had commanded the Operational Command South from 2012 to 2016.

He was the head of the Ivan Chernyakhovsky National Defense University of Ukraine from 2017 to 2022. He is the Doctor of military sciences, candidate of technical sciences, professor.

== Biography ==
Anatoliy Syrotenko was born on 4 March 1960 in the village of Natalyne in Kharkiv Oblast.

In 1981, he graduated from the Kharkiv Guards Higher Tank Command School. In the same year, he was appointed as a tank platoon commander in the Desna center, then he was a training tank platoon commander, a company commander, a battalion chief, a combatant, and a deputy regiment commander.

After graduating from the newly established Academy of the Armed Forces of Ukraine (first graduation), he commanded a regiment for two years and was chief of staff of the Desna educational center for three and a half years. Later, he studied at the Academy of the General Staff, after which he was assigned to Kharkiv. He was chief of staff for two years.

From November 2003 to August 2007, he headed the Kharkiv Guards Institute of Tank Troops named after the Verkhovna Rada of Ukraine.

In 2004, Sirotenko had been promoted to "major general".

From 2007 to 2012, he was the head of the "North" Territorial Administration.

Until July 2012, for a short time he served as the head of the Military Academy (Odesa) (former Odesa Institute of Ground Forces).

In 2012, Sirotenko became the commander of the forces of the Operational Command South.

In April 2016, he was appointed to the position of head of the Main Department of Defense and Mobilization Planning of the General Staff of the Armed Forces of Ukraine.

As of August 2017, he has been the head of the National Defense University of Ukraine named after Ivan Chernyakhovsky.
