= Oleh Vyshnivsky =

Russian-born Ukrainian armed forces officer

- Олег Віталійович Вишнівський
- Born: Oleh Vitaliyovych Vyshnivsky; 1970 (age 55–56); Chernyakhovsk, Russia, Soviet Union
- Military career
- Allegiance: Soviet Union; Ukraine
- Branch: Ukrainian Ground Forces
- Service years: 1987-
- Rank: Lieutenant general
- Commands: Operational Command South (2017-2019)
- War in Donbass: Russo-Ukrainian War

Lieutenant General Oleh Vitaliyovych Vyshnivsky (Ukrainian: Олег Віталійович Вишнівський; born in 1970), is a Russian-born Ukrainian army officer who had been the commander of the logistics forces of the Armed Forces of Ukraine from 2019 to 2021.

He had served as the commander of the Operational Command South from 2017 to 2019.

== Biography ==
Oleh Vyshnivsky was born in 1970 in Chernyakhovsk, Kaliningrad Oblast.

In August 1987 he joined the Soviet Army.

In 1991, he graduated from the Tashkent Higher Tank Command School.

In September 1993, he took an oath of loyalty to the people of Ukraine. In 1999, he graduated from the National Defense Academy of Ukraine.

In August 2004, he was the chief of staff - first deputy commander of the 30th separate mechanized brigade.

In October 2015, he became a major general. He was the first deputy chief of the Armaments of the Armed Forces of Ukraine.

On 16 November 2017, Vishnivsky became the commander of the Operational Command South Prior to that, he was thes the Chief of Staff — First Deputy Commander of the post.

In May 2019, he was promoted to lieutenant general.

On 6 July 2019, Vishnivsky was appointed commander of the logistics forces of the Armed Forces of Ukraine, and had been replaced by his successor Ihor Palahnyuk. He left the position in 2021.
