= Kozachi Laheri =

Kozachi Laheri may refer to the following villages in Ukraine:

- Kozachi Laheri, Kherson Raion, Kherson Oblast
- Kozachi Laheri, Kakhovka Raion, Kherson Oblast
