= 83rd Psychological and Information Warfare Center (Ukraine) =

- 83-й центр інформаційно-психологічних операцій
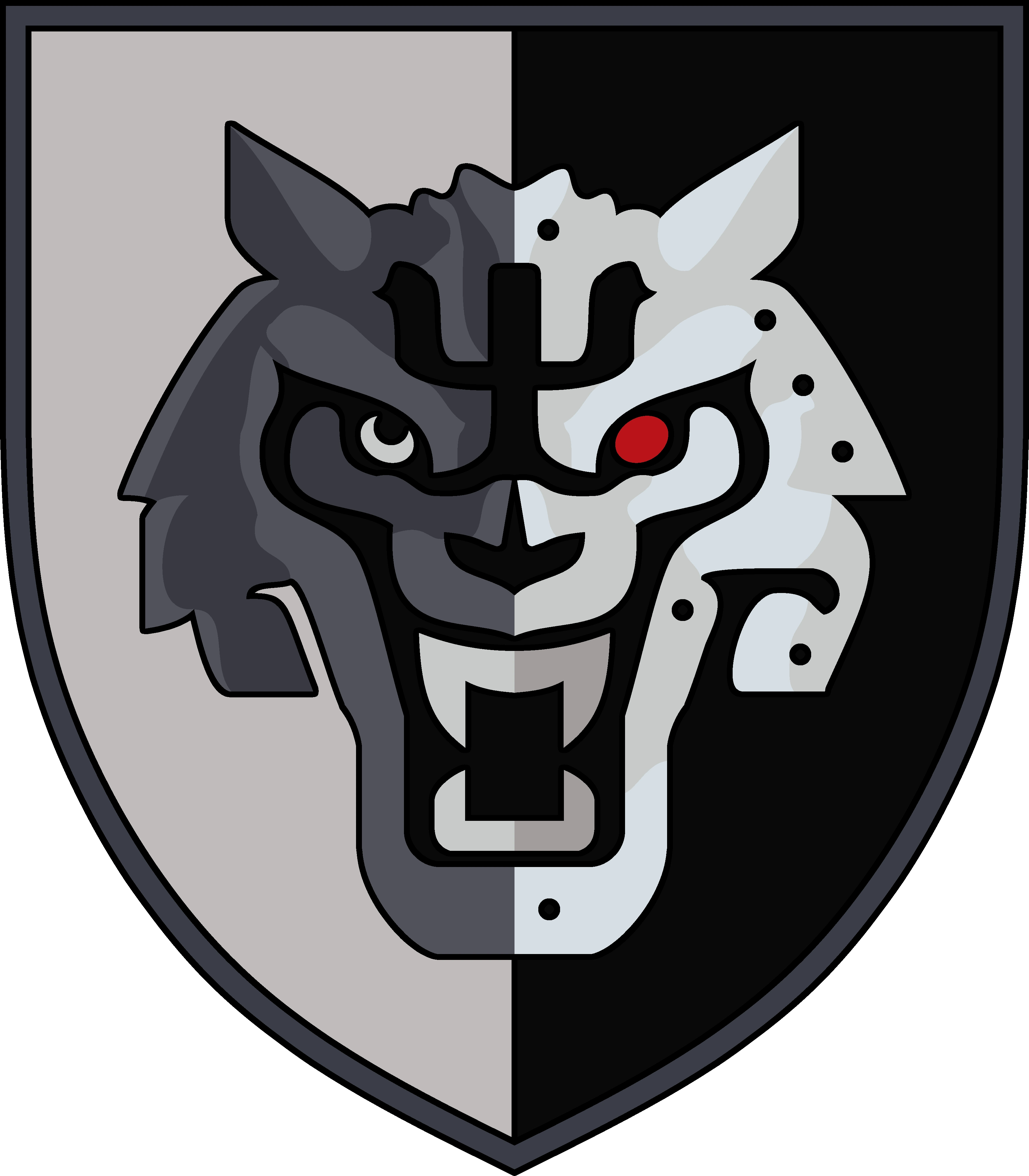
- Insignia
- Active: 2004-present
- Country: Ukraine
- Allegiance: Ukrainian Ground Forces
- Branch: Ukrainian Special Operations Forces
- Type: Regiment
- Role: psychological warfare and informational warfare
- Part of: Operational Command South
- Garrison/HQ: Odesa
- Engagements: Russo-Ukrainian War; War in Donbass; 2022 Russian Invasion of Ukraine

The 83rd Psychological and Information Warfare Center (MUN A2455) is a unit of the Ukrainian Special Operations Forces (SOF) concerned with psychological warfare and informational warfare. It was established in 2004 and is headquartered at Odesa.

== History ==
The center was established on 12 January 2004 on the basis of the editorial and publishing group of the Operational Command South, its official date of establishment however is 25 July 2004. On 1 August 2015, the center was transferred to the Special Operations Directorate following an order by the General Staff of the Armed Forces of Ukraine and in May 2016, the 83rd Center was transferred to the Special Operations Forces with an organizational event taking place on 16 May 2016. Its activities were partially determined by the "Information Security Doctrine of Ukraine" approved on 25 February 2017. The center is located in the zone under Operational Command South and the main staff offices are located at the Command Headquarters in Odesa.

Pro Russian media reported that the 83rd Center had made 6 requests to carry out information and propaganda campaigns for 663 thousand hryvnias specifically targeting Crimea and Sevastopol in 2017. In April 2020, separatist aligned media accused the 83rd CIPSO and writer Stanislav Aseyev of conducting misinformation campaign in Mariupol about a miners' strike at the Nikanor-Novaya mine and an alleged outbreak of COVID-19 in the separatist LPR Militia. It has also been accused of operating the "Crimea Today" newspaper website for "spreading propaganda". In September 2021, separatist aligned media alleged that the 83rd Center was attempting to stage a ceasefire violation in Donbass by conducting staged shelling of the positions of the 93rd Brigade. In February 2022, a hacker group named "Joker DPR" alleged that the 83rd Center was involved in formenting 2022 Kazakh unrest.

Following the 2022 Russian invasion of Ukraine, it was engaged in psychological and information warfare.

== Structure ==
The Structure of the center is as follows:

- 83rd Psychological and Information Warfare Center
  - Management & Headquarters
  - Operational department.
  - Information and analytical department
    - Information and analytical department
    - Information collection and processing group
  - Department of preparation and implementation of information operations
    - Printed Material Development Group
    - Department of Television and Radio Development
    - Information support Group
  - Department of preparation and implementation of information operation
    - Observation and Special Actions Department
    - Social Media Work Group
    - Group for the Development and protection of State Information resources
  - Support units
    - Radio station
    - Hardware Department
    - MTZ department
    - Financial and economic service
    - ODT Service
    - Medical service
  - Propaganda Group
  - Department of Information and Computer Technologies
    - Department of Telecommunication Networks

== Equipment ==
The center utilizes the following equipment:

Model	Image	Origin	Type	Number	Notes
Vehicles
ZS-88		Soviet Union	PsyOps vehicle with loudspeaker set	1	Based on BTR-80
ZAZ P-240TM		Soviet Union		1	
R-142		Soviet Union	Command and control vehicle	1	Based on GAZ-66
R-140-0.5		Soviet Union	Command and control vehicle	1	Based on GAZ-66
UAZ-3151		Soviet Union	Off-road military light utility vehicle	1	Also known as UAZ-469
KamAZ-4310		Soviet Union	All-wheel drive truck	1	KAMAZ-43105 variant
ZIL 131		Soviet Union	General purpose 3.5 tonne 6x6 Army truck	1	
NZAS-3964		Soviet Union	Combination bus	1	Based on GAZ-66
GAZ-2705		Russia	Panel van	1	
Toyota Land Cruiser		Japan	Four-wheel drive off-road Full-size SUV	2	
Nissan Rogue		Japan	Compact crossover SUV	1	Nissan Rogue SV AWD 2.5 variant
Radio Equipment
Harris RF-7800 Falcon III		United States	Base/Vehicle mounted combat-net radio/Vehicle mounted intercom/Manpack combat-net radio/Hand-held combat-net radio	1	Harris RF-7800-MP variant
Motorola DR3000		United States	Radio repeater with mounted duplexer	1	
Motorola DM4600		United States	Digital Mobile Radio	4	
Motorola DP4400		United States	Radio repeater	7	
BUKOVEL			Secure IR-phone	2	
Other
RVKA			Automated Editorial and publishing Complex	3	
Product 0271				1	
Product B271 "GNOM"				1	
Product B271-R "GNOM"				2	
TK TYPE-1			Tactical control field routers with VoIP support	2	
TK type-2			Battalion telecommunications set	1	
M-205			Encryption equipment	1	
M-425			Encoding equipment	1	
PD-205			Data transmission equipment	1	
Escape-5		United States	Vehicle trailer	2	

== Tasks ==
Its tasks include identification of anti-Ukrainian narratives, spread of pro-Ukrainian narratives, monitoring of sociopolitical situations, information warfare, psychological warfare, study of morale and psychological state of the troops and the general population of enemy states, development and use of propaganda, counterintelligence, reconnaissance, sabotage, preventative public warnings, conducting information leaks and special operations.

== Commanders ==
- Lieutenant Colonel Vadim Lavrus (?-?)
- Lieutenant Colonel Andrey Garbuzyuk (?-)
