= Volodymyr Karpenko =

Ukrainian military general

- Володимир Володимирович Карпенко
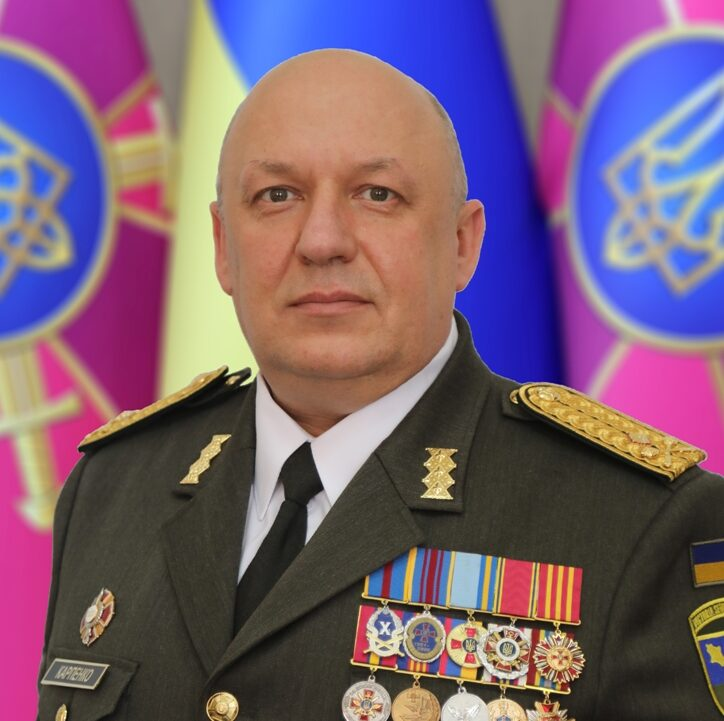
- Born: Volodymyr Volodymyrovych Karpenko
- Military career
- Allegiance: Ukraine
- Branch: Logistics Forces
- Rank: Major general
- Commands: Logistics Forces Command
- Conflicts: Russian Invasion of Ukraine

Volodymyr Karpenko is a Ukrainian serviceman, Major general of the Armed Forces of Ukraine who served as commander of the Logistics Forces from 29 February 2024 to 29 July 2026.
