= Logistics Functional Area Services =

NATO logistics software

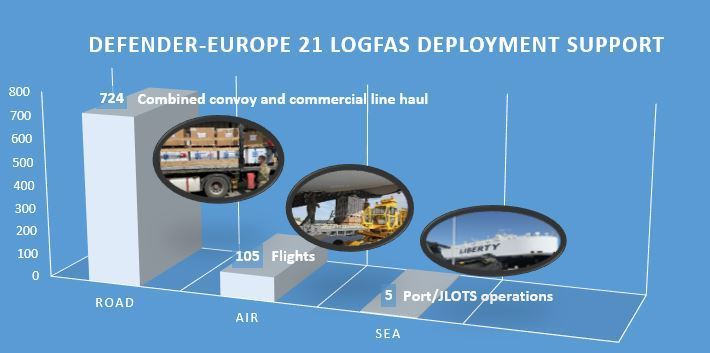
LOGFAS used to track equipment movement during Defender-Europe 21

Logistics Functional Area Services, better known as LOGFAS, is a software primarily used by NATO to manage logistics, process geographical data and operational planning.

== Overview ==
LOGFAS has been in service with NATO since 1995.

It was developed and is being maintained by the NATO Communications and Information Agency (NICA).

The software is a key element of NATO's interoperability. The alliance, that spans two continents and 28 languages, requires a unified system to manage a vast and complex logistics network efficiently and share information.

In 2019 Ukraine adopted the software for use in the newly created Logistics Forces of the Armed Forces of Ukraine.

LOGFAS is also the basis for the Enablement Support Services (ESS) which is being developed and is said to have 23 modules.

== Components ==
- ACROSS (Allied Commands Resource Optimisation Software System)
- GEOMAN (Geographical Data Management Module)
- LDM (LOGFAS Data Management Module)
- SPM (Sustainment Planning Module)
- ADAMS (Allied Deployment and Movements System)
- CORSOM (Coalition Reception, Staging and Onward Movement)
- SDM (Supply Distribution Module)
- EVE (Effective Visual Execution)
- LCM (LOGFAS Connection Manager Module)
- LOGREP (Logistic Reporting Tool)
