= Operational Command South =

- Оперативне командування «Південь»
- Founded: January 1998
- Country: Ukraine
- Allegiance: Armed Forces of Ukraine
- Branch: Ukrainian Ground Forces
- Type: Military district
- Role: Combined
- Part of: Command of the Ground Forces
- Headquarters: Mykolaiv, Mykolaiv Oblast
- Website: Official facebook site

Commanders
- Current commander: Major general Mykhailo Sydorenko

The Operational Command South (abbr. OC South, Ukrainian: Оперативне командування "Південь", ОК "Південь") is a formation of the Ukrainian Ground Forces in the southern part of Ukraine, which was formed in January 1998 as the Southern Operation Command on the basis of the Odesa Military District and was headquartered in Odesa. From 2005-2013 it was known as the Southern Operation Association.

In January 2007 RIA Novosti reported that destruction of ammunition would take place at the 275th artillery ammunition base near the village of Novobohdanivka, Zaporizhzhia region.

Until 2015 Operational Command South covered 9 oblasts and autonomous republics: Odesa, Kirovohrad, Mykolaiv, Kherson, Dnipropetrovsk, Zaporizhzhia, Kharkiv, Luhansk, Donetsk oblasts and the Autonomous Republic of Crimea. In 2015 eastern parts of the operation command territory were passed on to newly formed Operation Command East based in Dnipro. The headquarters of the OC South was relocated from Odesa to Mykolaiv.

== Composition ==
Map of the Operational Command South shown in dark green

By 1 July 2006, the Southern Operational Command included 6th Army Corps (6 AK) and other units comprising:

- 17th Armoured Brigade (Kryvyi Rih, Dnipropetrovsk Oblast)
- 28th Guards Mechanised Brigade (Chornomorske, Odesa Oblast) reorganized as 28th Mechanized Infantry Brigade in 2015.
- 92nd Mechanised Brigade Kluhoshyno-Bashkyrivka, Chuhuiv Raion, Kharkiv Oblast
- 93rd Mechanised Brigade. Cherkaske Novomoskovsk Raion Dnipropetrovsk Oblast.
- 55th Artillery Brigade (Zaporizhzhia)
- 107th Rocket Launcher Regiment (Kremenchuk, Poltava Oblast)
- 25th Airborne Brigade Hvardiiske Dnipropetrovsk Oblast
- 79th Airmobile Brigade (Mykolaiv)
- 11th Army Aviation Regiment (Chornobaivka, Kherson Oblast)
- 1039th Anti-Aircraft Rocket Regiment (Hvardiiske, Dnipropetrovsk Oblast)
- 3rd special purpose Regiment. Kropyvnytskyi
- 50 Academic squad of special training. Kropyvnytskyi

Exercises that command units have taken part in include "Autumn-98", "reaction", "Southern redoubt-99", "Redoubt-2000", including peacekeeping – series of "Peace Shield", "Cossack Steppe," "common neighborhood", "Sea Breeze", "Fairway of Peace," "South," "cooperative partner" joint exercises with units of the armed forces of France and Italy.

== Structure ==
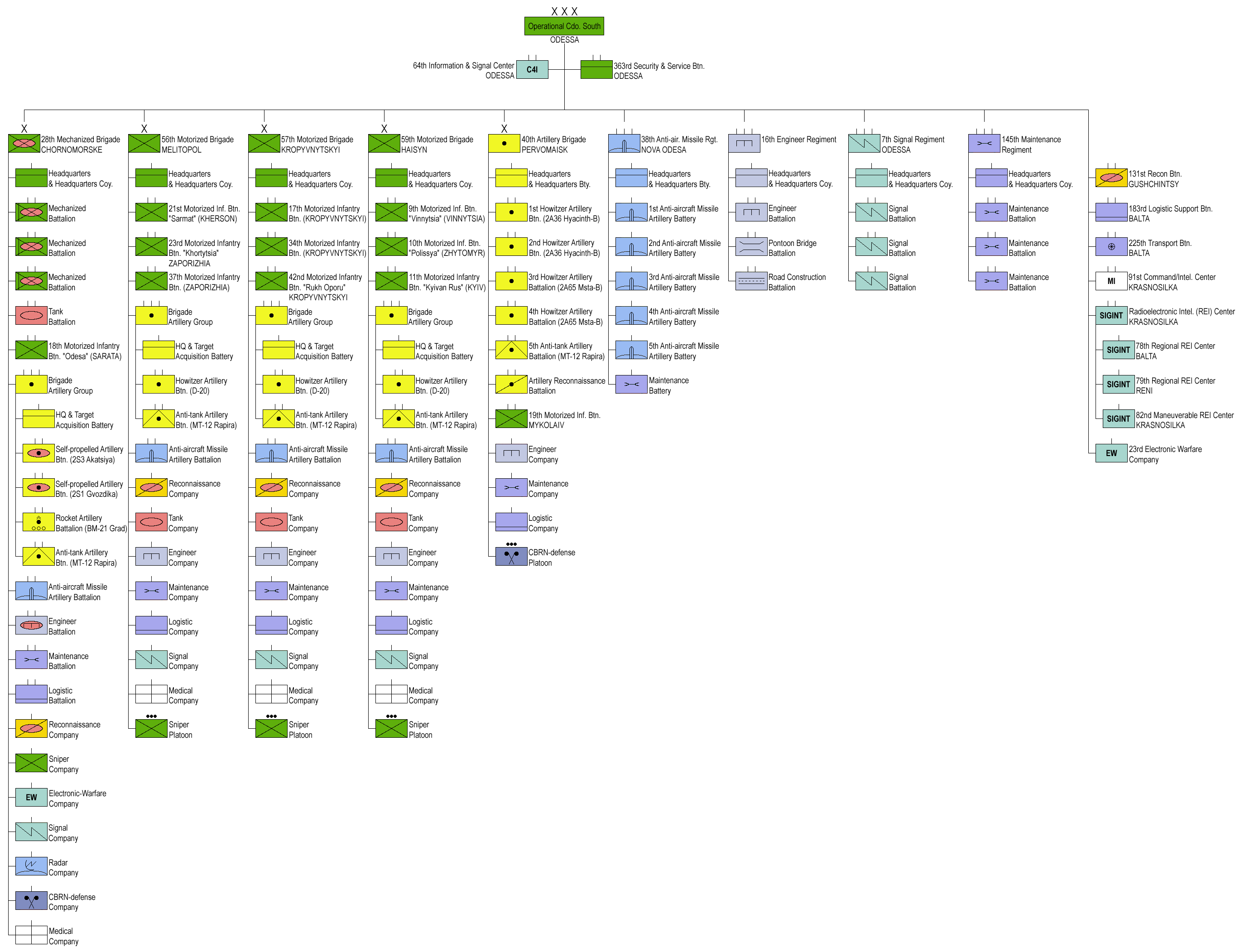
Structure of the Operational Command South in 2017 as per the best available Ukrainian language sources.

Operational Command South has operational staffs in Vinnytsia, Odesa, Mykolaiv, Kirovohrad, and Kherson oblasts.

- Operational Command South, (MUN A2393)
  - 5th Heavy Mechanized Brigade, Kryvyi Rih, A4594
  - 7th Signal Regiment, Odesa, А3783
  - 11th Army Aviation Brigade (was based in Kherson)
  - 16th Support Regiment, Semenivka, А2558
  - 21st Mechanized Brigade, Odesa, A4689
  - 22nd Mechanized Brigade, Mykhailivka, A4718
  - 28th Mechanized Brigade, Chornomorske, А0666
  - 31st Repair and Restoration Regiment, Podilsk, А1536
  - 38th Anti-Aircraft Missile Regiment, Nova Odesa A3880
  - 40th Artillery brigade, Pervomaisk, A2227
  - 41st Mechanized Brigade, Odesa, A4576
  - 48th Separate Assault Battalion, Mykolaiv, A4945
  - 56th Motorized Brigade, was based in Mariupol, А0989
  - 57th Motorized Infantry Brigade, Kropyvnytskyi, А1736
  - 59th Motorized Brigade, Haisyn, A1619
  - 60th Mechanized Brigade A1962
  - 61st Mechanized Jäger Brigade, Zhytomyr A3425
  - 91st Command & Intelligence Center, Krasnosilka A2152
  - 131st Separate Reconnaissance Battalion, Hushchyntsi, А1445
  - 143rd Separate Reconnaissance Battalion, Mykolaiv Oblast
  - 144th Infantry Brigade, A4828
  - 145th Maintenance Regiment, Mykolaiv, А1080
  - 154th Mechanized Brigade A4962
  - 159th Infantry Brigade, Mykolaiv Oblast
  - 183rd Separate Material Support Battalion, Balta, A1559
  - 225th Separate Transport Battalion, Balta, А3269
  - 363rd Guard & Service Battalion, Odesa, A1785
  - Radioelectronic Intelligence Center "South", Krasnosilka A3438
    - 78th REI Center, Balta A2395
    - 79th REI Center, Reni A2412
    - 82nd Maneuverable REI Center, Krasnosilka A2444
  - 23rd Electronic Warfare
  - 409th Separate Rifle Battalion (Ukraine)

=== Additional forces ===
The following formations of other branches of the Ukrainian Armed Forces, respectively the general staff of the Ukrainian ground forces, are based in the area of Operational Command South and can be assigned to the command as needed:

- Support Forces:
  - 70th Support Brigade, in Bar
  - 808th Support Brigade, in Bilhorod-Dnistrovskyi
- Air Assault Forces:
  - 79th Air Assault Brigade, in Mykolaiv
  - 81st Airmobile Brigade, in Druzhkivka
- Marine Corps:
  - 35th Marine Brigade, in Dachne
  - 36th Marine Brigade, in Mykolaiv
  - 37th Marine Brigade, in
  - 38th Marine Brigade, in
  - 124th Territorial Defence Brigade "Kherson"
  - 126th Territorial Defence Brigade "Odesa City"
  - 406th Marine Artillery Brigade, in Mykolaiv
  - 32nd Marine Artillery Brigade, in Altestove
  - 140th Force Reconnaissance Battalion
- Air Force:
  - 14th Radio Technical Brigade, in Odesa
  - 19th Special Purpose Radio Intercept Brigade, in Halytsynov
  - 160th Anti-Aircraft Missile Brigade, in Odesa
  - 208th Anti-aircraft Missile Brigade, in Kherson
  - 201st Anti-aircraft Missile Brigade, in Pervomaisk
  - 43rd Communication Regiment, in Odesa
  - 101st Communication Regiment, in Vinnytsia
  - 182nd Communication Regiment
  - 28th Airfield Engineer Battalion, in Mykolaiv
  - 1194th Electronic Warfare Battalion, in Pervomaisk
- Special Operations Forces:
  - Special Operations Center East, in Kropyvnytskyi (former 3rd Special Forces Regiment)
  - 73rd Naval Special Operations Center South, in Ochakiv
  - 83rd Information and Psychological Operations Center, in Odesa
- Territorial Defense Forces
  - 120th Territorial Defence Brigade "Vinnytsia"
  - 121st Territorial Defence Brigade "Kirovohrad"
  - 122nd Territorial Defence Brigade "Odesa"
  - 123rd Territorial Defence Brigade "Mykolaiv"
  - 1st Infantry Battalion "Vinnytsia"
  - 9th Infantry Battalion "Kirovohrad"
  - 12th Infantry Battalion "Odesa"
  - 11th Infantry Battalion "Mykolaiv"
  - 18th Infantry Battalion "Kherson"

== Leaders ==
Colonel General Volodymyr Shkidchenko commanded the Odesa Military District from December 1993 until it became the Southern Operational Command in February 1998.

=== Commanders ===
- General of the Army Vitaliy Radetsky (1992 - 1993)
- General of the Army Volodymyr Shkidchenko (1993 - 30 September 1998)
- Colonel General Oleksandr Zatynaiko (30 September 1998 - 19 December 2001)
- Colonel General Volodymyr Mozharovsky (19 December 2001 - November 2003)
- Colonel General Hryhoriy Pedchenko (November 2003 - 11 July 2005)
- Colonel General Ivan Svyda (11 July 2005 - 25 June 2007)
- Lieutenant General Petro Lytvyn (25 June 2007 - 2 May 2012)
- Major General Ihor Fedorov (2 May 2012 - 2 July 2012)
- Lieutenant General Anatoliy Syrotenko (2 July 2012 - 11 April 2015)
- Major General Andriy Hryshchenko (11 April 2016 - 16 November 2017)
- Major Genera Oleh Vyshnivsky (16 November 2017 - 6 July 2019)
- Major General Ihor Palahnyuk (6 July 2019 - 2021)
- Major General Andrii Kovalchuk (9 October 2021 – 16 April 2024)
- Brigadier General Hennadii Shapovalov (16 April 2024 – 4 February 2025)
- Major General Mykhailo Sydorenko (2025 - present)

=== Chiefs of staff - first deputy commanders ===
- Major General Serhiy Shaptala (2017 - October 2020)

=== Deputy commanders ===
- Major General Andriy Sokolov (2017–present)
