= Valeriy Chybineyev =

Ukrainian sniper, Hero of Ukraine (1988–2022)

- Чибінєєв Валерій Вікторович
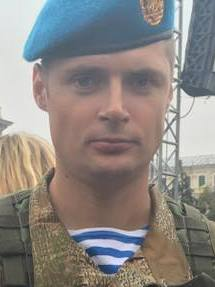
- Chybineyev in 2016
- Born: Valeriy Viktorovich Chybineyev; 3 March 1988; Berdiansk, Ukrainian SSR, Soviet Union
- Died: 3 March 2022 (aged 34); Hostomel, Ukraine
- Education: Odesa Military Academy
- Military career
- Allegiance: Ukraine
- Branch: Ukrainian Air Assault Forces
- Service years: 2010–2022
- Rank: Major
- Unit: 79th Air Assault Brigade
- Conflicts: Russo-Ukrainian War; War in Donbas; Second Battle of Donetsk Airport; Russian invasion of Ukraine; Battle of Hostomel †
- Awards: Hero of Ukraine

Valeriy Viktorovych Chybineyev (Ukrainian: Валерій Вікторович Чибінєєв; 3 March 1988 – 3 March 2022) was a Ukrainian sniper who served as commander of the sniper company of the 79th Air Assault Brigade and a member of the Main Directorate of Intelligence.

He took part in the War in Donbas from its very beginning in 2014, and fought to defend Donestk Airport. The following year he was awarded the Order of the Gold Star (Hero of Ukraine) for his actions during a combat mission in Avdiivka.

On his 34th birthday, Chybineyev was killed in the Battle of Hostomel during the Russian invasion of Ukraine.

== Early life and education ==
Chybineyev was born on 3 March 1988 in Berdiansk, Zaporizhzhia Oblast. His parents died while he was young and he was subsequently raised in an orphanage. He was influenced by the son of the orphanage's director who was a paratrooper, and at as a child reamed of becoming a reconnaissance paratrooper.

After 9th grade Chybineyev attended the Zaporizhzhia Regional Military Sports Lyceum Zakhisnik and became cadet of the Intelligence Faculty of the Military Academy before graduating from the Odesa Military Academy. Since his cadet years he developed a love of sports and reading, especially historical literature.

== Military career ==
In 2010, Chybineyev began his career as an officer with the rank of a lieutenant and joined the 79th Air Assault Brigade as platoon commander. When a sniper company was later formed for the brigade, he was selected to be its commander.

Chybineyev fought the War in Donbass from its first days in 2014. In the spring of that year his unit was deployed to Chervonyi Lyman, where they faced enemy fire that injured several of his soldiers. In another instance, he helped rescue three soldiers inside a tank that had hit a land mine. To avoid being taken captive, Chybineyev once claimed to be part of Russian-backed forces. In January 2015, he was one of the soldiers who fought in the Second Battle of Donetsk Airport.

In 2016, Chybineyev became the commander of the sniper company of the 79th Air Assault Brigade. In July 2016, he led sniper teams during a combat mission near Avdiivka. The unit successfully destroyed all twelve targets, including machine guns, grenade launchers, and snipers. Chybineyev was injured when a shell fragment lodged in his shoulder. He continued to lead the unit. For his actions, he was honoured with the Order of the Gold Star by President Petro Poroshenko during the Independence Day of Ukraine parade on Khreshchatyk street. He was subsequently promoted to major.

During 2018 he joined the special unit of the Main Directorate of Intelligence of the Ministry of Defense of Ukraine. In April 2019 his brother was killed in action during fighting in the Donetsk region, which concurrently depressed him and increased his zeal to fight.

On the eve of the full scale Russian invasion of Ukraine, Chybineyev was carrying out combat operations in Luhansk region. His combat group was transferred to the defence of Kyiv when the invasion began. During the first days of the war troops under his command conducted reconnaissance and sabotage operations against the Russian army.

On 2 March 2022, Chybineyev force's were tasked with providing sniper support to troops in Hostomel. As the Battle of Hostomel raged the following day he personally fought with a Barrett .50 cal sniper rifle against advancing Russian troops in the early morning hours, succeeding in knocking out several Russian BMD vehicles. Eventually he ran out of ammunition, after which he decided to engage in close quarters combat and picked up a machine gun. An officer in the Ukrainian Special Forces recounted of Chybineyev's actions during the fight for Hostomel:

In this battle, he was armed with a .50-caliber Barrett rifle. He positioned himself right on the roof of a bus stop and took up a firing position. During the engagement, he managed to fire about 100 armor-piercing rounds. All the Russian BMDs stopped at the Hostomel checkpoint bore holes caused specifically by Valeriy’s sniper rifle..

His death was reported on the afternoon of 3 March 2022, his 34th birthday.

== Personal life and legacy ==
In December 2016, Chybineyev was named by the Kyiv Post as one of the "Top 30 Under 30" young leaders in Ukraine. In a subsequent interview, he stated that he wanted to establish a sniper school.

His brother Roman, commander of an airborne assault platoon of the 79th Brigade, had died in the war in eastern Ukraine in 2019, and Chybineyev was buried at Berkovets cemetery next to his grave.

In the cities of Chernivisti and Kyiv, streets were renamed in his honor. In 2024, a 30-minute documentary film about his life was premiered on Ukrainian Independence Day.
