= Mykhailo Sydorenko =

- Михайло Павлович Сидоренко
- Born: Mykhailo Pavlovych Sydorenko; 15 December 1984 (age 41); Soviet Union
- Military career
- Allegiance: Ukraine
- Branch: Ukrainian Ground Forces
- Service years: 2002-
- Rank: Major general
- Commands: Operational Command South (14 July 2025-present)
- Battle of Kyiv: Russo-Ukrainian War

Mykhailo Pavlovych Sydorenko (Ukrainian: Михайло Павлович Сидоренко; born on 15 December 1984), is a Ukrainian military officer who is currently the commander Operational Command South since 2025. He is also the commander of the "Tavria" military command center since 2025. In 2023, he had been the head of the 169th training center.

== Biography ==
Mykhailo Sydorenko was born on 15 December 1984. He is a graduate of the Military Institute of Tank Forces in Kharkiv.

After graduating from the military institute, he served in the 17th separate tank brigade, where he held positions from platoon commander to line tank battalion commander. He later enrolled at the National Defense University of Ukraine named after Ivan Chernyakhovsky. After that, he was appointed as the chief of staff in the 53rd separate mechanized brigade.

In March 2022, he commanded the 10th separate mountain assault brigade. From 30 March to 2 April, the units under Sydorenko's leadership went on the offensive and liberated a number of settlements in the Kyiv region, in particular, they took control of the strategic settlement - the city of Ivankiv. The units under his command also repelled a massive enemy offensive and held the lines near Pokrovske, Donetsk Oblast.

In September 2023, he was the head of the 169th training center.

In 14 July 2025, Sydorenko became the commander of Operational Command South, as well as the commander of the "Tavria" OUV. On the same day, he was promoted to major general.
