= 121st Territorial Defense Brigade =

Ukrainian Territorial Defense Forces unit

- Ukrainian: 121-та окрема бригада територіальної оборони
- Active: 2018 - present
- Country: Ukraine
- Branch: Armed Forces of Ukraine
- Type: Military reserve force
- Role: Light infantry
- Part of: Territorial Defense Forces; Operational Command South
- Garrison/HQ: Kirovohrad Oblast; MUN А7049

Insignia
- Flag

The 121st Territorial Defense Brigade (Ukrainian: 121-та окрема бригада територіальної оборони) is a military formation of the Territorial Defense Forces of Ukraine in Kirovohrad Oblast. It is part of Operational Command South.

== History ==
=== Formation ===
In 2018 the brigade was formed in Kirovohrad Oblast. Colonel Dmytro Zavorotniuk went to command 101st Territorial Defense Brigade. He was replaced with Lieutenant colonel Serhii Kolos in 2021.

Exercises were held from 25 to 29 September, 23 to 25 October in 2018. 3 to 5 September, 24 to 27 September in 2019 and 16 to 18 January in 2020.

During April 2021 brigade held training exercise for reservists.

On 7 February 2022 brigade was 70% staffed, with close to 15% females. 30-40% of those who joined were veterans of the War in Donbas. Battalions had 50 soldiers and officers during peacetime and 400 in time of war. Brigade in time of would have over 3,000 soldiers. With the reorganization of Territorial Defense forces five battalions were planned.

=== Russo-Ukrainian War ===
==== 2022 Russian invasion of Ukraine ====
174th battalion spent late spring and early summer in vicinity of Sievierodonetsk and Lysychansk. They spent a month defending village of Borivske, Luhansk Oblast.

In late June and early July various units of the brigade held combat, communication and signal, training placing and removing mines training.

In October the 1st rifle company of the 175th battalion was stationed in Zaporizhzhia oblast. Other units of the brigade were stationed in Kherson Oblast where they captured enemy equipment.

Colonel Serhii Zadorozhnyi took command during 2022. On 4 December, the brigade received its battle flag.

176th battalion was stationed near Kherson in February 2023.

On 11 May 2023 units of the brigade held joint training with Ukrainian Naval Aviation.

== Structure ==
As of 2022 the brigade's structure is as follows:

- Headquarters
- 174th Territorial Defense Battalion (Kropyvnytskyi) MUN А7340
- 175th Territorial Defense Battalion (Oleksandriia) MUN А7341
- 176th Territorial Defense Battalion (Holovanivsk) MUN А7342
- 177th Territorial Defense Battalion (Bobrynets) MUN А7343
- 178th Territorial Defense Battalion (Novoukrainka) MUN А7344
- 179th Territorial Defense Battalion (Svitlovodsk) MUN А7345
- Engineering Company
- Communication Company
- Logistics Company
- Mortar Battery

== Commanders ==
- Colonel Dmytro Zavorotniuk 2018 - 2021
- Colonel Serhii Kolos 2021 - 2022
- Colonel Serhii Zadorozhnyi 2022 - present

== See also ==
- Territorial Defense Forces of the Armed Forces of Ukraine
