= Ishkiv =

Rural locality in Ternopil Oblast, Ukraine

Ishkiv Ішків
- Location in Ternopil Oblast
- Coordinates: 49°24′21″N 25°20′59″E
- Country: Ukraine
- Oblast: Ternopil Oblast
- Raion: Ternopil Raion
- Hromada: Kupchyntsi rural hromada
- Time zone: UTC+2 (EET)
  - Summer (DST): UTC+3 (EEST)
- Postal code: 47663

Ishkiv (Ukrainian: Ішків) is a village in Kupchyntsi rural hromada, Ternopil Raion, Ternopil Oblast, Ukraine.

== History ==
The first written mention of the village was in 1430.

After the liquidation of the Kozova Raion on 19 July 2020, the village became part of the Ternopil Raion.

== Religion ==
- St. Michael church (1934; brick, painted by Ivan Trush).

== Notable residents ==
- Ihor Fedorov (born 1954), Ukrainian soldier

== Sources ==
- (in Ukrainian) Сидорак І., Уніят В., Ішків // Ternopil Encyclopedic Dictionary: in 4 v. / editorial board: H. Yavorskyi and other, Ternopil: "Zbruch", 2004, V. 1: А—Й, S. 689. — ISBN 966-528-197-6.
- "Iszczków, przys. w. Rosochowaciec". Geographical Dictionary of the Kingdom of Poland (in Polish). 3. Warszawa: Kasa im. Józefa Mianowskiego. 1882. p. 307.
- "Rosochowaciec (1) z Iszkowem". Geographical Dictionary of the Kingdom of Poland (in Polish). 9. Warszawa: Kasa im. Józefa Mianowskiego. 1888. p. 762.
