= Land Forces =

Land Force or Land Forces may refer to:

- Land army or army
- Albanian Land Force
- Azerbaijani Land Forces
- Bulgarian Land Forces
- Canadian Forces Land Force Command, the former name of the Canadian Army
- Czech Land Forces
- Estonian Land Forces
- Georgian Land Forces
- Land Forces of the Democratic Republic of the Congo
- Land Forces of the National People's Army, a former army branch in the German Democratic Republic
- Latvian Land Forces
- Lithuanian Land Force
- Multinational Land Force – Italy, with Hungary and Slovenia
- Polish Land Forces
- Romanian Land Forces
- Royal Brunei Land Force
- Turkish Land Forces
- United Kingdom Land Forces, a former British Army command
