= Odesa Military Academy =

Ukrainian higher military institution in Odesa

- (Ukrainian): Військова академія (м. Одеса)
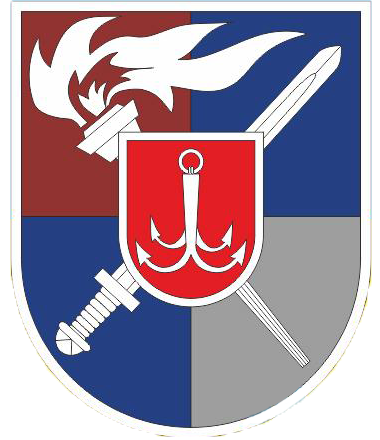
- Insignia of the Academy
- Motto: Честь, Мужність і Професіоналізм (Honor, Courage and Professionalism)
- Type: Military academy
- Established: June 30, 2011
- Founders: Government of Ukraine
- Affiliations: Armed Forces of Ukraine
- Academic affiliations: Odesa National Polytechnic University
- Commandant: Major General Andrii Kovalchuk
- Location: 10 Fontanska Road, Odesa, Ukraine; 46.441°N 30.742°E
- Language: Ukrainian
- Colors
- Website: Official website

The Odesa Military Academy is a modern higher military institution of the inter-services Armed Forces of Ukraine. The academy conducts language training for servicemen and employees of the Armed Forces of Ukraine, advanced training of military personnel and scientific and pedagogical workers, and the preparation of students in the training of reserve officers.

== Origins ==
=== Creation ===
The academy's predecessor could be considered the Odesa Infantry School that was established in 1865 by order of the Russian Minister of War. It was then intended to be a preparatory school training infantrymen to serve at the military officer rank. The school's building was designed by the Russian architect Vasily F. Maas. The military academy was succeeded by the Cadet Corps, which was created on April 16, 1899, by direct the order of Nicholas II, according to the order of creating the school. The idea for creating the cadet corps came from the commander of the Odesa Military District, Count Alexander Ivanovich Musin-Pushkin, who in the mid-1890s recognized the need for the establishment of a special military educational institution in the city of Odesa.

=== Soviet era ===
In July 1919, the courses were reorganized into the Military School of the Eastern Front. During the Russian Civil War, courses and schools were repeatedly relocated as the Red Army advanced to Ukraine. In July 1941, the school was redeployed to the Saratov Oblast. In December 1943, the school was given the honorific of Mikhail Frunze. In 1947, it was named the Kiev United College of Self-propelled Artillery. In July 1954, the school was redesignated the Kiev Tank School and was then called the Kiev Command and Technical School, before being renamed to the Kiev Higher Combined Arms Command School. In 1943 and 1968, the school was awarded the Order of the Red Banner. In 1968, it became the senior educational institution of the Soviet Armed Forces for the training of officers of military intelligence units.

=== Reorganization ===
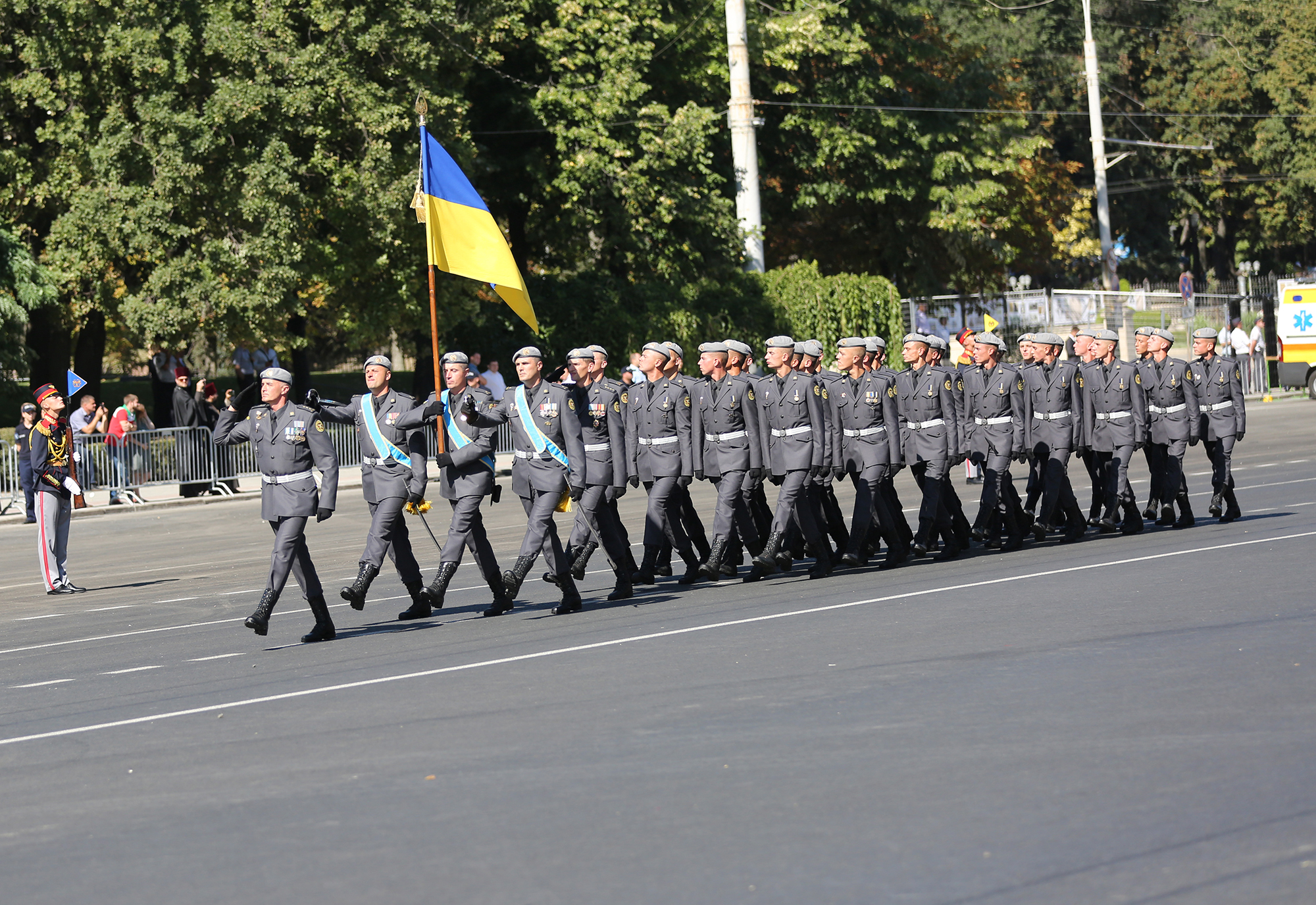
A formation of the school in the 2016 Chișinău Independence Day Parade

By the decree of the Cabinet of Ministers of Ukraine on August 19, 1992, the school was closed. After the fall of the Soviet Union, the school remained largely inactive until the military academy was reestablished on June 30, 2011, on the basis of the Military Institute of the Odesa National Polytechnic University in accordance with the Decree of the Cabinet of Ministers of Ukraine signed on March 23, 2011.

Until that date the Military Institute, formerly the Ground Forces Institute of Odesa created in the fall of 1992, carried the traditions of the academy.

== Specialties ==
Training is conducted in 12 military accounting specialties:

- Mechanized formations
- Airborne, mountain infantry and marine units
- Special intelligence
- Military intelligence
- Special purpose units (except naval)
- Special purpose units of the Ukrainian Navy
- Communication units
- Material and technical means
- Food supply
- Material support
- Repair of small arms and melee weapons
- Psychology

== Cadet activities and traditions ==
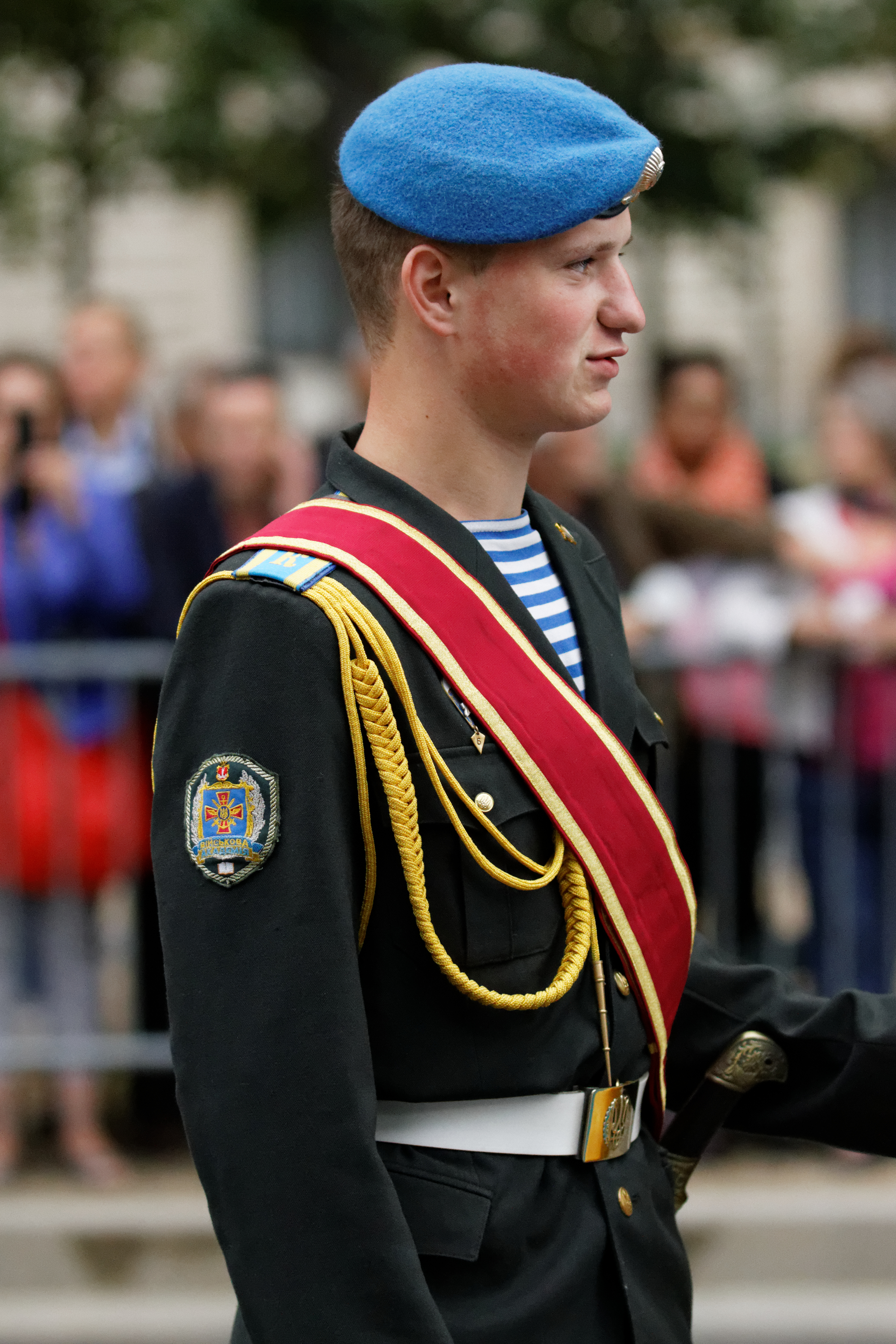
A cadet of the school in Paris.

On 14 July 2014, a contingent from the academy took part in the Bastille Day military parade dedicated to the 100th anniversary of the start of the First World War in Paris. A group of cadets and military musicians led by Lieutenant Colonel Mykola Konovalyuk took part in parade training for a week prior on the Champs Elysees, with another Ukrainian delegation of seven representatives of the school who speak French and English marching in a color guard procession and participating in other theatrical actions.

Cadets of the academy in 2016 took part in the Chișinău Independence Day Parade on Great National Assembly Square.

=== Academy band ===
The Band of the Odesa Military Academy (Ukrainian: Військовий оркестр військової академії України) was established in December 2012 and has its origin from the 9th Military Band of the Soviet Army (established in 1964) and the local Song and Dance Ensemble (established in 1939). In 1988, the former won first place at a Moscow competition of small military bands of the Soviet Armed Forces. The choir group of the ensemble showed their art in 1993 at the Leontovich Choir Competition, where it won the 1st place, and in 1995 the dance group became the Laureate of the International Folk Dance Competition in Samsun, Turkey. Today, the small ensembles that are part of the band include a parade band, a jazz band, a ballet group, brass and chamber quintets as well as a concert band. The band represents the academy at all military occasions and the country at international military festivals.

== Notable alumni of the academy and its predecessors ==
- Mohamed Kahin Ahmed
- Rovshan Akbarov
- Oleksiy Arestovych
- Murat Bektanov
- Kyrylo Budanov
- Leonid Maltsev
- Ivan Panfilov
- Serhiy Popko
- Valerii Zaluzhnyi
- Valeriy Chybineyev
