= Kozachi Laheri, Kakhovka Raion, Kherson Oblast =

Village in Ukraine

Coordinates: 46°56′45″N 34°3′0″E

Kozachi Laheri (Ukrainian: Коза́чі Лагері, lit. 'Cossack Camps') is a village (selo) in Kakhovka Raion, Kherson Oblast, Ukraine. It has a population of 504.

== History ==
In February 2022, the village was occupied by Russian forces during the Russian invasion of Ukraine.

== Demographics ==
According to the 1989 Soviet census, the number of people in the village was 571, of which 263 were men and 308 were women.

By the time of the 2001 Ukrainian census, it had a population of 496.

=== Language ===
In the 2001 census, the native languages of the inhabitants of the village were:

Language	%
Ukrainian	98.81 %
Russian	1.19 %
