= Andriy Hryshchenko (footballer) =

Ukrainian footballer

Personal information
- Date of birth: 3 October 1974 (age 52)
- Place of birth: Korosten, Soviet Union
- Height: 1.83 m (6 ft 0 in)
- Position: Striker

Youth career
- Lokomotiv Korosten

Senior career*
Years	Team	Apps	(Gls)
1993	Pedinstytut Kamianets-Podilskyi		
1993	Metalist Kharkiv	1	(0)
1994	SBTS Sumy	16	(4)
1994–1995	Yavir Krasnopillya	49	(7)
1995–1996	Ahrotekhservis Sumy	12	(2)
1996	Zlín	27	(0)
1997	Górnik Zabrze	2	(0)
1997–1999	Chemik Police		
1997	→ Stomil Olsztyn (loan)	7	(1)
1998	→ Aluminium Konin (loan)		
1999–2000	Hrvatski Dragovoljac	14	(0)
2000	Aluminium Konin		
2000–2001	Stal Stalowa Wola		
2001–2002	Górnik Polkowice		
2002–2004	Górnik Łęczna	51	(8)
2004–2006	Arka Gdynia	59	(9)
2007–2008	FC Korosten		
- * Club domestic league appearances and goals

Andriy Hryshchenko (born 3 October 1974) is a Ukrainian former professional footballer who played as a striker.

He retired in 2008 while playing with FC Korosten in the Ukrainian Druha Liha. During his career he has played in Ukraine, Czech Republic, Poland and Croatia.
