= Eskhar =

Rural locality in Kharkiv Oblast, Ukraine

Eskhar Есхар
- Rural settlement
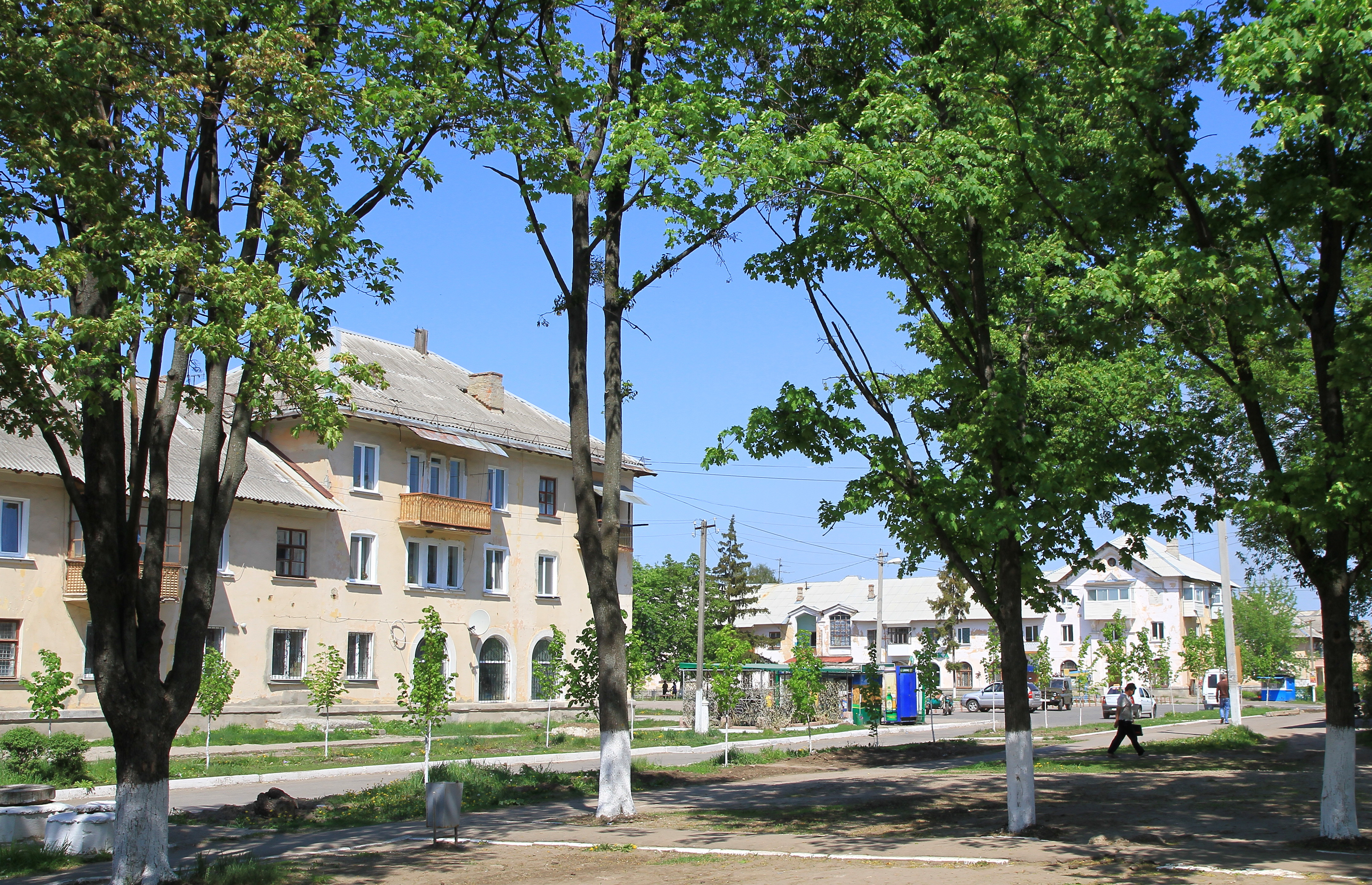
- One of the streets of Eskhar

- Location in Kharkiv Oblast Location in Ukraine
- Coordinates: 49°47′49″N 36°35′27″E
- Country: Ukraine
- Oblast: Kharkiv Oblast
- Raion: Chuhuiv Raion

Population (2022)
  - Total: 5,163
- Time zone: UTC+2 (EET)
  - Summer (DST): UTC+3 (EEST)

Eskhar (Ukrainian: Есхар, Russian: Эсхар) is a rural settlement in Chuhuiv Raion of Kharkiv Oblast in Ukraine. It is located on the right bank of the Donets. Eskhar belongs to Novopokrovka settlement hromada, one of the hromadas of Ukraine. Population: 5,163 (2022 estimate).

Until 26 January 2024, Eskhar was designated urban-type settlement. On this day, a new law entered into force which abolished this status, and Eskhar became a rural settlement.

== Economy ==
=== Industry ===
A power plant is active in the settlement, supplying electricity to Kharkiv.

=== Transportation ===
The closest railway station, Dachi, is 3 kilometres (1.9 mi) northeast of the settlement, on the railway connecting Kharkiv and Kupiansk-Vuzlovyi. There is passenger traffic.

Eskhar is connected by road with Chuhuiv where there is road access to Highway M03 connecting Kharkiv and Sloviansk.
