= Ihor Palahnyuk =

Ukrainian army officer

Ihor Palagnyuk
- Ігор Миколайович Палагнюк
- Born: Ihor Mykolayovych Palagnyuk; 29 July 1966 (age 60); Vashkivtsi, Ukraine, Soviet Union
- Military career
- Allegiance: Soviet Union; Ukraine
- Branch: Ukrainian Ground Forces
- Service years: 1987-
- Rank: Lieutenant general
- Commands: Operational Command South (2 July 2019-2021)
- War in Donbass: Russo-Ukrainian War

Ihor Mykolayovych Palagnyuk (Ukrainian: Ігор Миколайович Палагнюк; born 29 July 1966), is a Ukrainian army officer who is currently the chief of staff - Deputy Commander of the Land Forces of the Armed Forces of Ukraine. He had served as the commander of the Operational Command South from 2019 to 2021.

== Biography ==
From 2014 to 2015, he was promoted to head of the command center — deputy chief of staff of the Operational Command East.

In 2015, Palagnyuk became the deputy commander of the Operational Command East.

From 2016 to 2017, he was the deputy commander of the troops of the operational command.

In 2017, Palagnyuk graduated from the National Defense University of Ukraine named after Ivan Chernyakhovsky and obtained qualifications: master's degree, professional in the field of defense, operational-strategic level officer. On that same year, he was appointed the chief of staff — first deputy commander Operation Command East. In 2018, he was appointed to the post of Chief of the Main Command Center of the Armed Forces of Ukraine.

On 2 July 2019, by order of the Minister of Defense of Ukraine, Palagnyuk was appointed commander of the forces of the operational command "South".

Since 2021, Palagnyuk is currently the Chief of Staff — Deputy Commander of the Land Forces of the Armed Forces of Ukraine.
