= National Defence University of Ukraine =

Public university in Kyiv, Ukraine

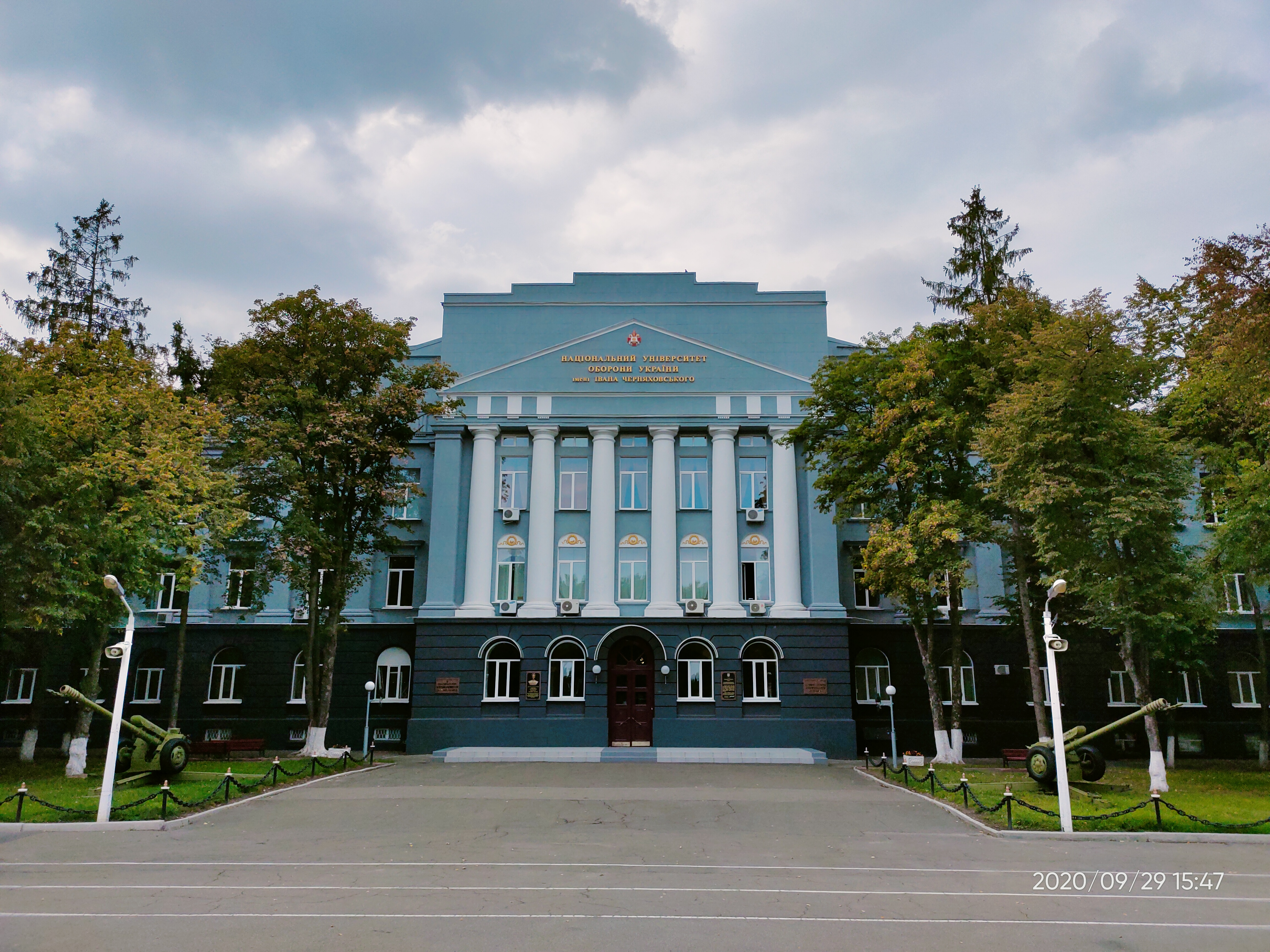
- The NDUU campus
- Former name: Ivan Chernyakhovsky National Defence University of Ukraine (2013–2023)
- Type: Military Academy
- Established: 1914; 112 years ago
- Accreditation: Ministry of Education and Science of Ukraine
- Rector: Colonel General Mykhailo Koval
- Location: Kyiv, Kyiv Oblast, Ukraine
- Website: nuou.org.ua
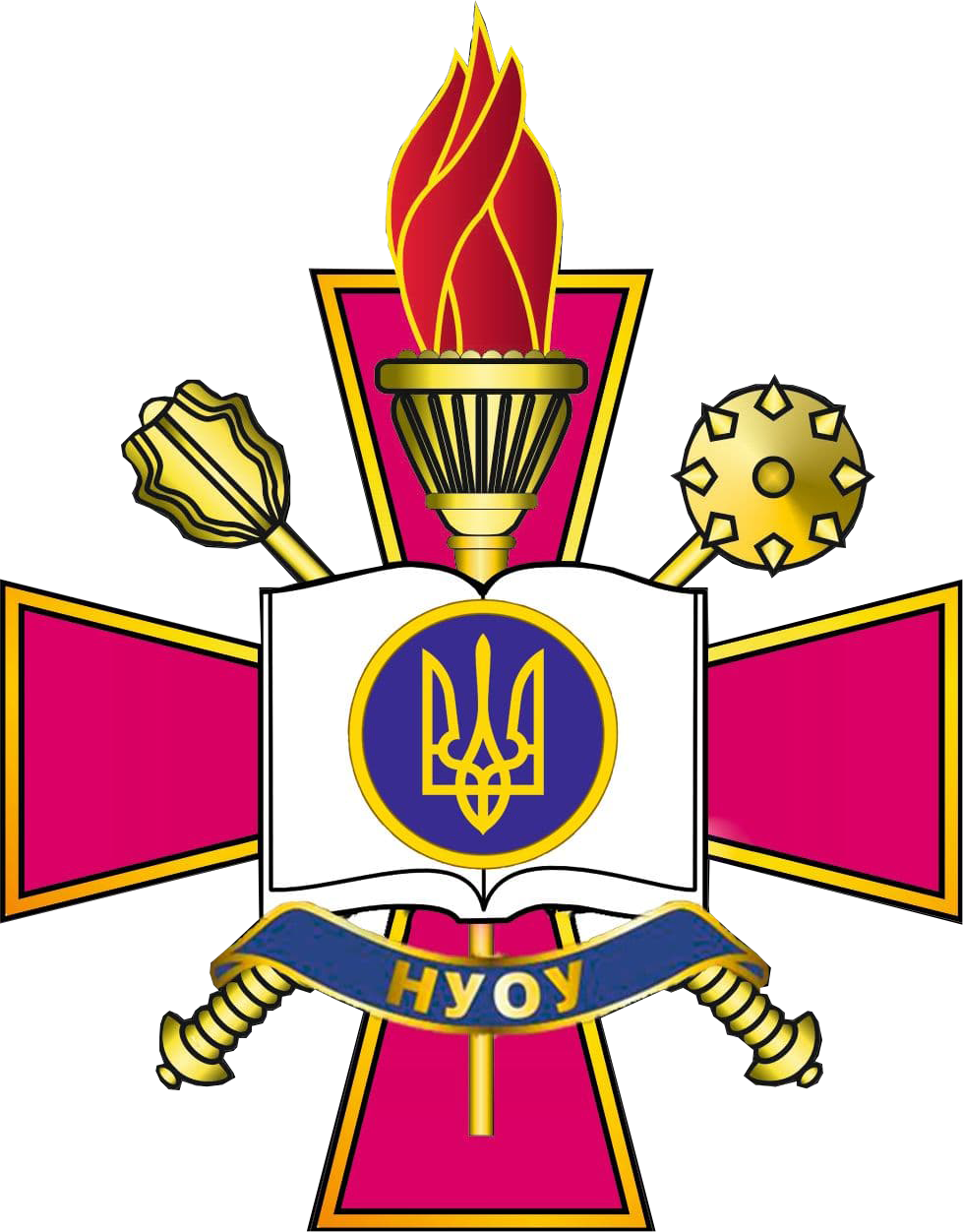

The National Defence University of Ukraine (abbr. NDUU, Ukrainian: Національний університет оборони України, romanized: Natsionalnyi Universytet Oborony Ukrainy) is a public university of higher military education in Ukraine, located in its capital city of Kyiv. Subordinated to the Ministry of Defence of Ukraine, the university trains officers specializing in national defence.

The university was founded in 1992 as the Academy of Ukrainian Armed Forces and later Academy of Defence.

== History ==
=== Origins ===
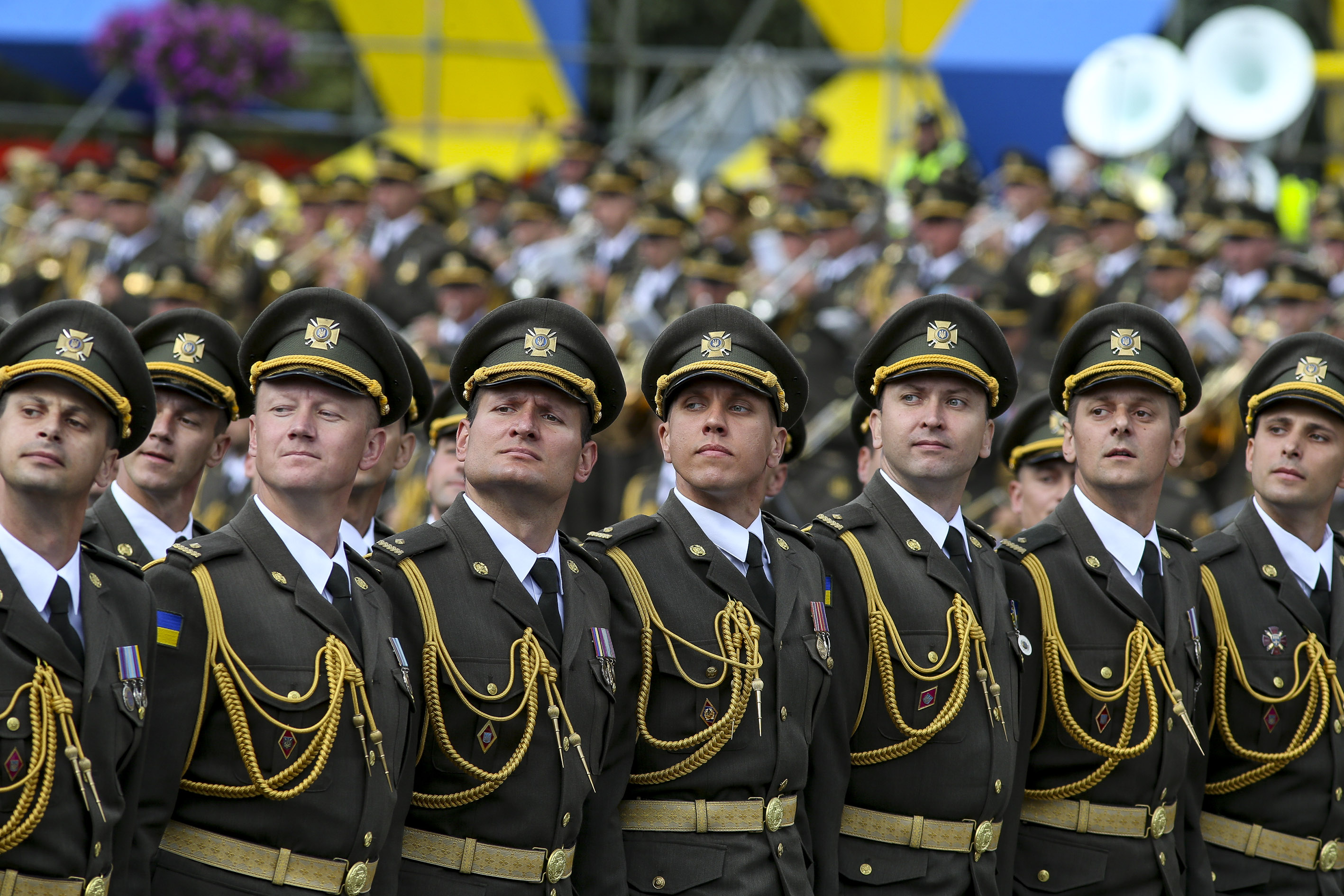
Cadets of the NDUU marching in the 2017 Kyiv Independence Day Parade.

==== Imperial era ====
It traces some of its heritage to the Second Kyiv Military Infantry and Nikolaevskoe Artillery schools (Russian: Второе Киевское военное пехотное и Николаевское артиллерийское училища) that were opened in Kyiv during World War I in 1914.

The Kyiv Nikolaevskoe Artillery School was established in the building that today belongs to the Higher Specialized Court of Ukraine (on criminal and civil issues).

==== Soviet era ====
With the 1919 Soviet invasion of Ukraine (see Ukrainian–Soviet War), the school was transformed into the Kyiv Artillery courses, while the Infantry School was named after the Workers of Red Zamoskvorechye. In May–July 1920 the artillery courses were forced to relocate to Poltava due to advance of Polish-Ukrainian troops and Petr Vrangel's White Armies. In Poltava the courses were merged with the Odesa Artillery courses into the Fourth Kyiv Artillery Courses.

In 1922 the courses were renamed into the Fourth Artillery School and in 1933 were named after Pavel Pavlovich Lebedev, a Russian Hero of the Russian Civil War. In 1935 the school was renamed into the First "Pavel Lebedev" Artillery School and in February 1941 had its honorific changed to the 1st Artillery School "Sergei Kirov" (in honor of the assassinated Chairman of the Leningrad City Party Committee). During the Nazi invasion of the Soviet Union, the school was evacuated to Krasnoyarsk and returned to Kyiv on in September 1944. In 1958 it was renamed into the Kyiv Higher Artillery Engineer School and in 1973 into the Kyiv Higher Rocketry Engineer School. In 1974 the school became the Kyiv campus of the Ground Forces Air Defence Military Artillery Academy. In 1977 it was transformed further into the Kyiv Military Academy of Ground Forces Air Defence.

=== Independent Ukraine ===
With the fall of the Soviet Union in 1992, the Ground Forces Air Defence Military Academy became the Academy of Ukrainian Armed Forces which in 1999 was renamed as the Ukrainian Academy of Defence. In 2008 the academy was transformed into a university. Five years later, it was given the honorific of "Ivan Chernyakhovsky", in honor of the Ukrainian-born Soviet general of the army (the youngest ever to hold this rank). This was revoked in June 2023 by President Volodymyr Zelenskyy.

== Departments ==
The Department for reserve officers of the National Defence University of Ukraine recruits students for training program for reserve officers to military occupational specialties:

- Logistic support
- Mathematical and the maintenance of the automated systems
- Social Psychology
- Political Science
- Finance and Economics
- Construction and operation of military and special structures
- Application of engineering and engineering - engineering units

== Institutes and training centers ==
- Institute of State Military Administration;
- Staff Command Institute in Deployment of Forces;
- Institute of Aviation and Air Defence;
- Institute of Operational Support and Logistics (formerly Kyiv Higher Engineer School of Armor Forces and Kyiv Institute of Ground Forces);
- Institute of Information Technologies;
- Humanitarian Institute;
- Scientific Methodical Center in organization of educational activities;
- Scientific Methodical Center in organization of scientific and science-technical activities;
- Training center of International Humanitarian activities;
- Training center of foreign languages;
- Training center of physical training and sports-recreational technologies;
- Center of retraining and professional development;
- Center of imitational modeling;
- Research laboratory in perspective of e-learning development;
- Center of military strategy research;
- Reserve Officers training faculty;
- Scientific Center on issues of Prevention of Corruption in security and defence sectors.

== Famous graduates and lecturers ==
- Mykhailo Drapatyi
- Ihor Herasymenko
- Ihor Hordiichuk
- Maksym Marchenko
- Oleksandr Syrskyi
- Vladimir Varyukhin
- Sergei Yeliseyev
- Valerii Zaluzhnyi

== See also ==
- List of universities in Ukraine
