= 55th Communications Regiment (Ukraine) =

- 55-й окремий полк зв'язку
- Regiment insignia
- Founded: 1941
- Country: Ukraine
- Allegiance: Ministry of Defence
- Branch: Ukrainian Ground Forces
- Type: Regiment
- Role: Communications
- Garrison/HQ: Rivne
- Engagements: Russo-Ukrainian War; War in Donbass; Russian invasion of Ukraine

Commanders
- Current commander: Colonel Korovchenko Denys Volodymyrovych

Insignia
- Field Insignia

The 55th Separate Communications Regiment (MUN A1671) is a regiment level signal and communication unit of the Ground Forces of Ukraine, operationally under the command of Operational Command West. It was established on 5 July 1941 as part of the Soviet union's 13th army and took part in the Second World War. Then in 1991, it swore allegiance to Ukraine being the first unit to do so and has since 2014, taken part in both the War in Donbass and the Russian invasion of Ukraine.

== History ==
The 55th separate regiment began its establishment process on 5 July 1941 on the basis of the 675th separate signal battalion in Kozaky, Oryol Oblast with Captain Iosif Ivanovich Grusha as its first commander. On 30 October 1941, after escaping the encirclement in Stara Huta area together with units of the 13th Combined Arms Army, the 55th separate signal regiment completed its formation and started providing services on 2 November 1941. On 6 August 1943, the regiment was awarded the Battle Banner. In February 1944, the regiment participated in the Rivne-Lutsk offensive and was involved in the capture of Rivne. On 9 August 1944, the Signal Regiment was awarded the Order of the Red Banner for "excellent valor" against the invading Germans. On 19 February 1945, the regiment was given the honorary name Perokivsky for service during the Battle of Piotrków Trybunalski. The regiment then fought its way from Yelets to Prague. In 1945, the 55th Separate Signal Regiment returned to headquarters in Rivne after completing its duties. From 1–20 March 1947, the regiment became the 679th separate signal battalion before being reverted to the 55th regiment between 13 November and 15 December 1948. It later went on to serve during the Chernobyl incident and the Soviet-Afghan War.

With the proclamation of Ukraine's independence and the Dissolution of the Soviet Union, the regiment's personnel, led by Colonel Vilen Martirosyan swore allegiance to Ukraine on 2 December 1991 or 6 December 1991 in Rivne, becoming the first military unit to officially do so. On 1 November 1995, it received MUN A1671. In 2000, the regiment was awarded the Diploma of the International Open Rating of Popularity and Quality of Goods and Services “Golden Fortune” and awarded the Order “For Labor Achievements” 4th degree. From May to June 2000, the regiment's servicemen were deployed as part of the United Nations Interim Force in Lebanon from June 2000 to September 2001, as part of Kosovo Force and were also deployed in Iraq, Congo, Liberia and Sierra Leone at different times. In July 2004, the 55th Separate Signal Regiment was reformed into the 55th Separate Linear-Nodal Signal Regiment. In May 2005, the regiment's personnel participated in exercises including the deployment of mobile command posts. On 4 May 2006, the 55th Separate Signal Regiment was awarded the Ukrainian Battle banner. The regiment then took part in multiple exercises including "Artery 2007", "Interaction 2010", "Adequate Response 2011", "Perspective 2012" and "Autumn Cyclone 2013". On 31 October 2013, the 55th Separate Signal Regiment was transferred to Operational Command North and was expanded to a brigade on 30 December 2013.

With the start of the War in Donbass, the brigade quickly formed a combined communications unit, which in the spring was deployed to the ATO zone establishing a command post in Orekhovo, providing communications to Ukrainian units engaged in combat in Shchastya, Lysychansk, Severodonetsk, Krasnyi Lyman and Metalist. In summer 2014, the regiment provided communications to the units encircled at the Luhansk International Airport as well as logistical support to the besieged units, engineering support, escort and convoy transport. During July–August 2014, the unit provided communications to the units engaged in Solntsevo, Amvrosiivka and Kuteynykove and evacuated damaged equipment from the Savur-Mohyla area. The regiment continued to perform communication tasks throughout the ATO zone but had to partake in combat operations at checkposts en route to Bakhmut. On 30 March 2015, the brigade was transferred to the Operational Command West and was stripped of Soviet decorations on 23 December 2015. In 2016, the 55th Separate Signal Brigade was again reorganized into the 55th Separate Signal Regiment. During 2014–2018, the personnel of the regiment were engaged at Orekhovo, Metalist, Stukalova Balka, Zemlianky, Lyman, Vesela Hora, Shchastia, Pobeda, Bila Gora, Trokhizbenka, Stanytsia Luhanska, Novokhtyrka, Severodonetsk, Lysychansk, Rubizhne, Heorhiivka, Zholobok, Raihorodne, Kreminna, Bakhmut, Cherovnyi Zhovten, Krynske, Geivka, Savur-Mohyla, Starobesheve and Kuteynykove.

Following the Russian invasion of Ukraine, the regiment has been deployed to provide communications and has been involved in deploying radio networks and remote control lines at the frontlines, performing combat missions since mid 2022. Its tasks mostly included deploying and maintaining command posts, mobile communication support networks, relay points, and installing video surveillance cameras throughout the front but specially in the Zaporizhzhia Oblast. On 23 August 2023, it received 2.6 million UAH from Rivne city council.

== Commanders ==
- Hrusha Yosyp Ivanovich (1941)
- Lazhintsev Ivan Grigorovich (1942–1947)
- Semyon Fedorovych Tsirov (1948–1949)
- Lit Ivan Kuzmich (1949–1950)
- Tkachenko Ivan Leontiyovych (1950–1951)
- Bondarev Grigory Nikolaevich (1951–1957)
- Fadeev Sergey Fedorovich (1957)
- Pavlo Ivanovich Savvych-Demianyuk (1957–1966)
- Kozyr Mykola Vasilyevich (1966–1968)
- Semenov Stepan Yakovlevich (1968–1970)
- Anatoly Ivanovich Belykh (1970–1974)
- Voronin Yevgeny Grigorovich (1974–1976)
- Kovalev Nikolay Pavlovich (1976–1980)
- Mordvinov Vladimir Vasilyevich (1980–1982)
- Korendyuk Eduard Georgievich (1982–1983)
- Kryvenko Gennady Andriyovych (1983–1984)
- Vilen Harutyunovych Martirosyan (1984–1992)
- Berkasov Sergey Fedorovich (1992–1997)
- Dovbnya Volodymyr Viktorovych (1997–1998)
- Viktor Pavlovych Denysiuk (1998–2002)
- Savenko Oleksandr Vasyliovych (2002–2004)
- Patapov Sergey Nikolaevich (2004–2014)
- Kyago Oleksandr Mykolayovych (2014–2019)
- Antonyuk Oleksandr Leonidovych (2019–2023)
- Korovchenko Denys Volodymyrovych (2023-)

== Equipment ==
Type	Image	Origin	Class	Notes
Vehicles
Ural-4320		Soviet Union	General purpose off-road 6×6 vehicle	
KamAZ-4310		Soviet Union	All-wheel drive truck	
KamAZ-5320		Soviet Union	6×4 Flat bed truck	
ZIL-131		Soviet Union	General purpose off-road 6×6 vehicle	
GAZ-66		Soviet Union	General purpose off-road 4×4 vehicle	

== Structure ==
The structure of the regiment is as follows:

- Management & Headquarters
- 1st Signal Battalion
- 2nd Signal Battalion
- Radio relay Battalion
- Mobile Communications Battalion
- Material support Company
- Logistical Support Company
- Repair Company
- Commandant Platoon
