= Volodymyr Shvediuk =

- Володимир Петрович Шведюк
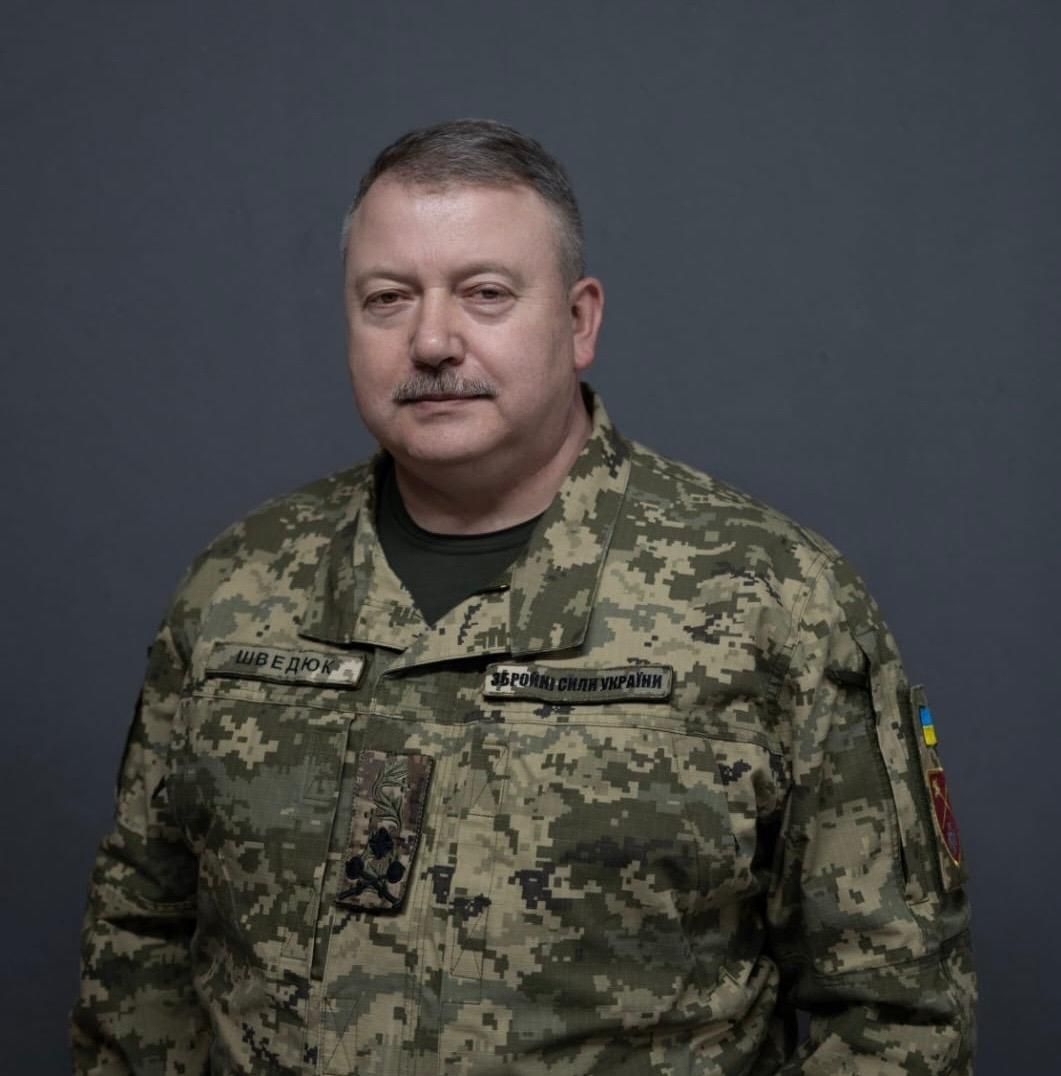
- Shevdiuk in 2025
- Born: Volodymyr Petrovych Shvediuk; 23 June 1969 (age 57); Ivashkivtsi, Ukraine, Soviet Union
- Military career
- Allegiance: Ukraine
- Branch: Ukrainian Ground Forces
- Rank: Brigadier general

Volodymyr Petrovych Shvediuk (Ukrainian: Володимир Петрович Шведюк; born on 23 June 1969), is a Ukrainian army officer who is currently the commander of the Operational Command West since 15 April 2024.

== Biography ==
Volodymyr Shvediuk was born in Ivashkivtsi, Vinnytsia Oblast, on 23 June 1969.

In 1990, he graduated from the Higher Tank Command School. He passed through all command and staff levels.

He commanded a tank battalion, was chief of staff of a tank regiment, deputy commander of a separate brigade of the Navy's marines, and chief of staff of a separate brigade of the Navy's coastal defense.

In 2001, he successfully completed his studies at the National Defense Academy of Ukraine.

In 2003, he served in the Crimean Marine Corps, later transferring to the Coast Guard.

In April 2015, he was appointed as the Chief of Staff - First Deputy Commander of the 59th Separate Motorized Infantry Brigade.

Until 2016, he participated in hostilities in the Luhansk region near the cities of Popasna, Artemivsk, and Zolote.

From 2018 to 2019, he participated in hostilities in the Stanytsia Luhanska area, the city of Shchastia. At the same time, he was the commander of the 59th Separate Motorized Infantry Brigade.

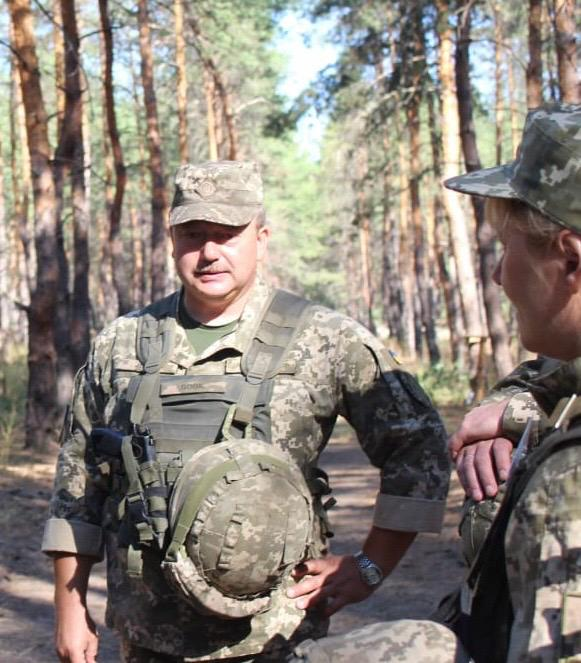
Svediuk in 2018

From 2019 to 2021, he was a student at the National Defense University of Ukraine.

In 2021, Deputy Commander of the TRO Forces of the Armed Forces of Ukraine, a position he held until March 2022.

Between March 2022 and February 2023, he was the Chief of Staff of the Joint Forces Group of the Armed Forces of Ukraine, and after their disbandment, he was the Chief of Staff of the Lyman Joint Forces Group. On 17 June, he was promoted to Brigadier General.

On 15 April 2024, Shvediuk became the Commander of the Operational Command West.
