= Mykhailo Kutsyn =

Ukrainian general (born 1957)

- Михайло Миколайович Куцин
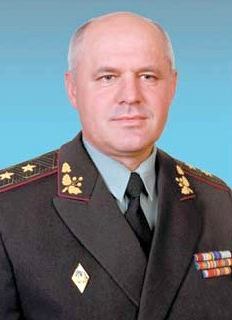
- Kutsyn in 2016
- Born: 15 August 1957 (age 69); Svoboda, Berehove Raion, Zakarpattia Oblast, Ukrainian SSR, Soviet Union
- Military career
- Allegiance: Soviet Union (1978–1991); Ukraine (1992–2014)
- Branch: Soviet Army; Ukrainian Ground Forces
- Service years: 1978–2014
- Rank: Lieutenant General
- Commands: Western Operational Command; (2004–2010); Armed Forces of Ukraine; (2014)
- Conflicts: Russo-Ukrainian War; Crimean Crisis of 2014; War in Donbas

Mykhailo Mykolayovych Kutsyn (Ukrainian: Михайло Миколайович Куцин; born 15 August 1957) is a Ukrainian Lieutenant General, who served as a Chief of the General Staff and Commander-in-Chief of the Armed Forces of Ukraine. He was appointed Chief of the General Staff by acting president Oleksandr Turchynov on 28 February 2014. Kutsyn was relieved of this post by president Petro Poroshenko on 3 July 2014. Poroshenko thanked Kutsyn for his service and stated he had been shell-shocked on 2 July 2014 in Donbas, and was recovering at a hospital.

A graduate of Tank school, Kutsyn served with the Soviet Army in Kazakhstan, Kyrgyzstan, Czechoslovakia and East Germany. He enlisted as a Major in the Ukrainian Ground Forces after the nation gained independence in 1991, and was head of the Western Operational Command for six years, before being appointed Deputy Minister of Defence in March 2010.

== Biography ==
He graduated from the Blagovishchensk Higher Tank Command School (1978), the Military Academy of Armored Troops (Moscow, 1990), the Faculty of Training Specialists of the Operational-Strategic Level of the National Defense Academy of Ukraine (2001).

He began his officer service as a tank platoon commander of the Group of Soviet Forces in East Germany.

From 1980 to 1987, he was a platoon commander, commander of a company of cadets of the Kharkiv Higher Tank Command School.

From 1990 to 1992, he held the positions of deputy commander, tank battalion commander, and deputy chief of staff of the tank regiment of the Belarusian Military District.

Since December 1992, he has served in the Armed Forces of Ukraine.

From 1992 to 1996, he served as Chief of Staff and regiment commander of the Carpathian Military District of the Ukrainian Ground Forces.

From 1996 to 1999, he was Chief of Staff, commander of the 24th Mechanized Division of the Western Operational Command.

On 20 August 1999, he was promoted to Major General.

In 2001, he graduated from the faculty of training operational-strategic level specialists of the National Defense Academy of Ukraine.

From 2001 to 2004, he served as Chief of Staff, Commander of the 13th Army Corps of the Western Operational Command.

From 2004, he was the first deputy commander, then from 19 July 2004 to 2010, he was the commander of the troops of the Western Operational Command.

From 31 March 2010 to 8 April 2011, he served as Deputy Minister of Defense of Ukraine.

From 28 February 2014 to 3 July 2014, he served as Chief of the General Staff.

He was a member of the NSDC from 19 March to 16 June, and from 23 June to 5 July 2014.

On 2 July 2014, during hostilities in the area of the Anti-Terrorist Operation, he was contused, after which he was taken to the hospital.

== Awards and decorations ==
Order of Bohdan Khmelnytsky 2nd class (2008)
Order of Bohdan Khmelnytsky 3rd class (2005)
Medal For Military Service to Ukraine (1997)
Medal for Battle Merit (Soviet award)

Military offices
Preceded by Fedor Alexandrovich Prohorov	Commander of the 24th Motor Rifle Division; 1996–1999	Succeeded by Volodymyr Kysilyov
Preceded by	Commander of the 13th Army Corps; 2001–2004	Succeeded by
Preceded by Mykola Petruk	Commander of the Western Operation Command; 2004–2010	Succeeded by Yuriy Dumansky
Preceded by Yuriy Ilyin	Chief of the General Staff; 2014	Succeeded by Viktor Muzhenko
