= 130th Reconnaissance Battalion (Ukraine) =

Ukrainian military volunteer unit

- 130-й окремий розвідувальний батальйон
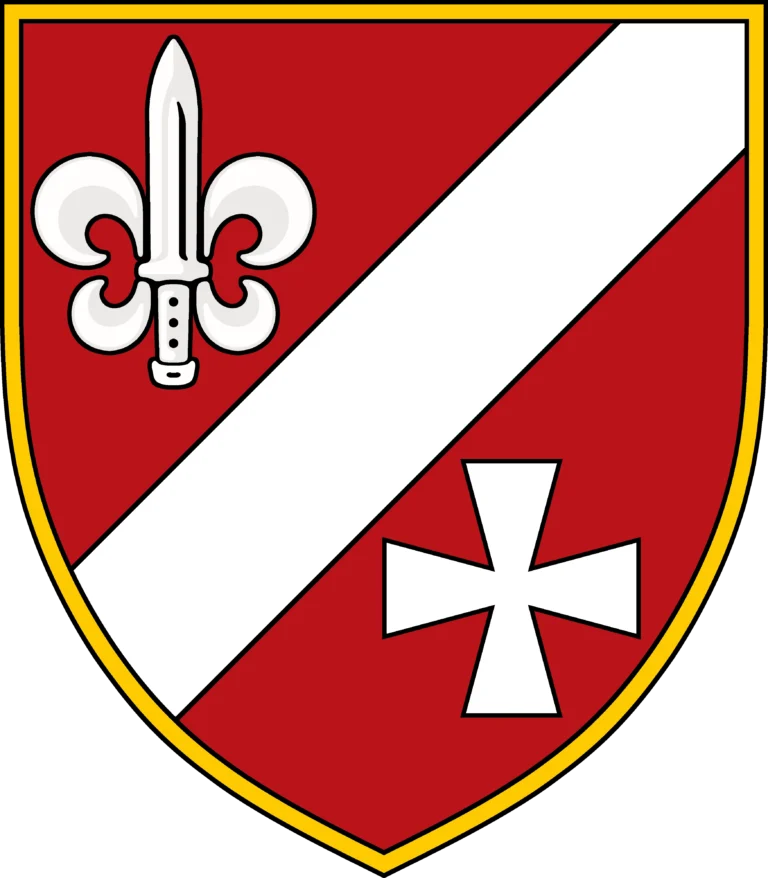
- Battalion's insignia
- Founded: 2014
- Country: Ukraine
- Allegiance: Armed Forces of Ukraine
- Branch: Ukrainian Ground Forces
- Type: Battalion, spetsnaz
- Role: Reconnaissance, counteroffensive and sabotage
- Part of: Operational Command West
- Garrison/HQ: Dubno
- Engagements: Russo-Ukrainian War; War in Donbass; 2022 Russian invasion of Ukraine

Insignia
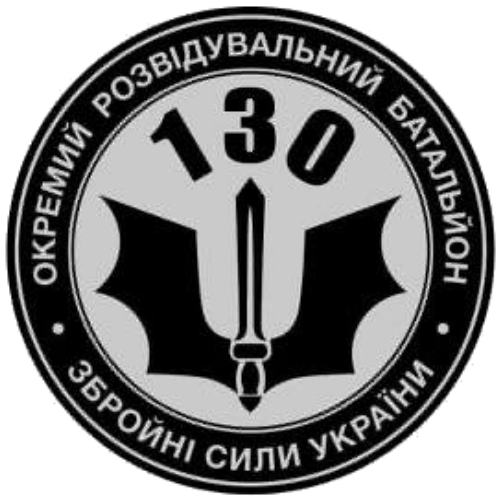
- Former Insignia

The 130th Separate Reconnaissance Battalion (MUN A1994) is a battalion of the Ukrainian ground forces acting as an independent unit subordinated directly to the Operational Command West and has seen combat during both the War in Donbass and the Russo-Ukrainian war, performing reconnaissance and combat operations throughout the entire front.

== History ==
It was established on 4 April 2014 as a separate reconnaissance battalion for the Operational Command West.

On 8 June 2015, at midnight, near Grechishkyne, in a clash between a reconnaissance group of the battalion and the DRG of the Luhansk People's Republic, a soldier of the battalion, Andriy Vasylovich Brik was killed. On 27 September 2015, a soldier of the battalion was murdered at its position in Purdivka, his body had gunshot and stabbing wounds. On 22 November 2015, a soldier of the battalion, Bilyk Andriy Bogdanovych died in Malinove after being blown up by a landmine while performing a combat operation. On 5 October 2016, an officer of the battalion, Yarovets Maksym Oleksandrovych was killed by a landmine explosion while on a combat mission. On 23 October 2016, while performing a combat mission in Luhanske, a soldier of the battalion, Khrupchyk Ivan Vasilyovych was killed. On 23 May 2018, a meeting was held in Dubno regarding the issue of transferring the premises of the Dubno Correctional Colony to the battalion and the process was completed in August 2018. On 5 January 2020, in Zolote, a GAZ-66 truck of the battalion was blown up by a TM-62, a serviceman of the 130th Battalion Dychek Serhiy Oleksandrovych was killed and another soldier was seriously wounded.

In March 2022, the battalion's group conducted operations in the Kyiv Oblast between Ivankiv and Kyiv. The group conducted a successful ambush on a column of about fifty retreating Russian vehicles on 31 March 2022 near Leonivka and Zymovyshche killing 20 Russian soldiers. Later, the battalion's Bravo Group conducted many operations in the Zaporizhia direction and in Donetsk Oblast, aimed specifically at recapturing lost positions. During the 2023 Ukrainian counteroffensive, the group conducted four successful assaults. The group stormed Lobkove in coordination with the 128th Brigade, having only one soldier wounded. The assault on Pyatikhatky was more difficult as Russians used tanks to counterattack but were defeated. During combat near Robotyne, many soldiers were wounded being engaged in mining, ambushes, and FPV warfare. The battalion was also amongst the first to take part in the 2024 Kursk offensive being deployed there since the first days and was amongst the units to capture Sudzha. In October 2024, Andriy's unit was transferred to the Kursk direction in the Sumy region. On 24 October 2024, a soldier of the battalion, Olshansky Andriy Vitaliyovych received shrapnel wounds and died on 26 October during evacuation in the Sumy Oblast as a result of a drone attack.

== Equipment ==
Model	Image	Origin	Type	Number	Details
Heavy weaponry
NLAW		Sweden; United Kingdom	Fire-and-forget, lightweight shoulder-fired, and disposable line of sight ATGM		
Mk 19		United States	40 mm belt-fed automatic grenade launcher		
Assault Rifles
M4A1		United States	5.56×45mm NATO assault rifle		
CZ 805 BREN		Czech Republic	5.56×45mm NATO assault rifle		
FN SCAR		Belgium	5.56×45mm NATO assault rifle		
Unmanned Aerial Vehicles
DJI Mavic		China	FPV drone		

== Structure ==
The structure of the battalion is as follows:

- 130th Reconnaissance Battalion
  - Management and Headquarters
  - 1st Reconnaissance Company
  - 2nd Reconnaissance Company
  - Long Range Reconnaissance Company
  - Unmanned Aerial Vehicle Company
    - FPV drone Platoon
    - Reconnaissance UAV Platoon
    - UAV information collection and processing department
  - Maintenance Company
  - Fire Support Company
    - Machine Gun Squad
    - Sniper Squad
  - Material support Platoon
  - Bravo Group
  - Commandant Platoon
  - Medical Center

== Commanders ==
- Lieutenant Colonel Levchenko Valeriy Valentinovich

== Sources ==
- "Міноборони формує понад 16 нових військових частин". ipress.ua. iPress.ua. 14 February 2015. Archived from the original on 6 August 2017.
- Олександр Громаков, підполковник, начальник штабу 130-го окремого розвідувального батальйону
- 130-й окремий розвідувальний батальйон
- Здолбунівщина: сотні людей провели в останню путь загиблого бійця 130 окремого розвідувального батальйону
- Військові Рівненщини мають власні бойові прапори
- Миколу Ткачука вбили у військовій частині
- Відбулось розширене засідання колегії облдержадміністрації
- Автомобіль розвідбатальйону з зони АТО передали на експонування у рівненський музей
- Розвідувальний батальйон ЗСУ повернувся із зони АТО
- 130 й окремий «розвідбат» у Млинові
- У Рівному відбувся чемпіонат з легкоатлетичного кросу серед військовослужбовців
- 130 окремий розвідувальний батальйон
