= 44th Artillery Brigade (Ukraine) =

Ukrainian Ground Forces unit

- 44-та окрема артилерійська бригада
- Active: September 9, 2014 – Today
- Country: Ukraine
- Branch: Ukrainian Ground Forces
- Type: Rocket and Artillery Forces
- Role: Artillery
- Size: Brigade
- Part of: Operational Command West
- Garrison/HQ: Ternopil, Ternopil Oblast
- Motto(s): The fire does not burn the hardened!
- Engagements: Russo-Ukrainian War
- Decorations: For Courage and Bravery

Commanders
- Current commander: Roman Dudchenko

Insignia
- Subdued SSI

- Alternative insignia

The 44th Artillery Brigade "Hetman Danylo Apostol" (Ukrainian: 44-та окрема артилерійська бригада імені гетьмана Данила Апостола; 44 ОАБр) is an artillery brigade of the operational command West of the Armed Forces of Ukraine, based in Ternopil.

Its military unit number is А3215, and its military mail code is В1428.

== History ==
The creation of the 44th Artillery Brigade began in September 2014 in the Lviv Oblast, on the basis of the International Center for Peacemaking and Security of the Hetman Petro Sahaidachny National Army Academy.

In May 2016, soldiers from the Band of the 44th artillery brigade performed Shche ne vmerla Ukraina nearly 300 metres underground, breaking a world record.

=== Formation ===
Combat training of the brigade's servicemen took place at the Yavorovsky military training ground.

On December 10, 2014, the completion of the formation of the brigade was announced.

By December 12, 2014, the brigade numbered over 1,000 military personnel in three divizions (of which about 300 completed training and were sent to the combat zone in eastern Ukraine, and over 700 more continued training).

By December 29, 2014, the brigade was provided with 70% equipment (however, there were not enough vehicles to tow guns, and some of the vehicles received on mobilization required repair).

At the end of January 2015, the military camp of the previously disbanded 11th Separate Guards Artillery Brigade in Ternopil became the place of permanent deployment of the brigade, the movement of equipment and property of the brigade to Ternopil continued until February 13, 2015.

On February 12, 2015, the acting brigade commander said in an interview that the brigade is staffed by 90% (there are contract servicemen among the military, but 90% of the personnel are mobilized) and the brigade has three howitzer divizions and the fourth divizion is equipped with one battery.

=== War in Donbas (2014-2022) ===
Throughout 2014 and 2015, the brigade sustained casualties in the Debaltseve and Artemivsk (now Bakhmut) areas.

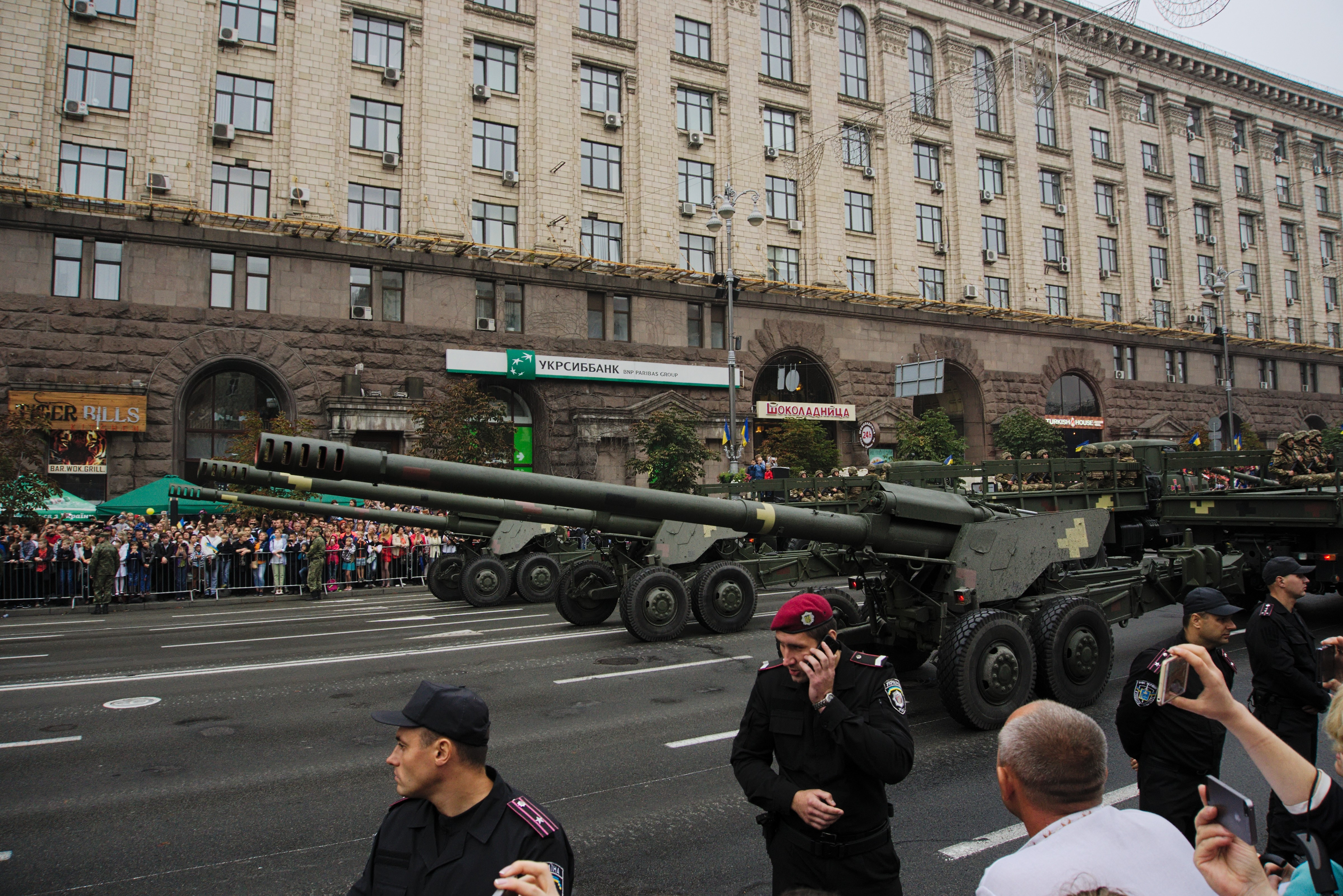
A column of towed guns 2A36 Giatsint-B of the 44th artillery brigade at the parade, Kyiv, August 24, 2016.

On January 28-29, 2015, the personnel of the 3rd anti-tank battery of the anti-tank divizion of the brigade conducted defensive battles in the area of the city of Vuhlehirsk. After all the anti-tank guns of the battery were destroyed on January 28, 2015, the gunners, together with allied units, continued to defend positions. Facing an encirclement, the brigade retreated to the south.

In late January - early February 2015, brigade units fired at the Donetsk airport.

On March 30, 2015, the brigade units were withdrawn from the combat zone to the place of permanent deployment.

According to brigade's sources, as of March 1, 2020, the 44th Artillery Brigade lost 26 people during the Donbas war.

=== Russo-Ukrainian War ===
During the 2023 Ukrainian Counteroffensive the brigade has been involved in Southern campaign in the Zaporizhzhia direction. On Sept. 4, 2023, the brigade destroyed a convoy of trucks with Russian infantry reinforcements and ammunition, which had stopped in one of the forest roads south of the village Verbove.

Units of the 44th Artillery Brigade reportedly participated in the Ukrainian operation in Russia's Kursk Oblast in 2024.

== Structure ==
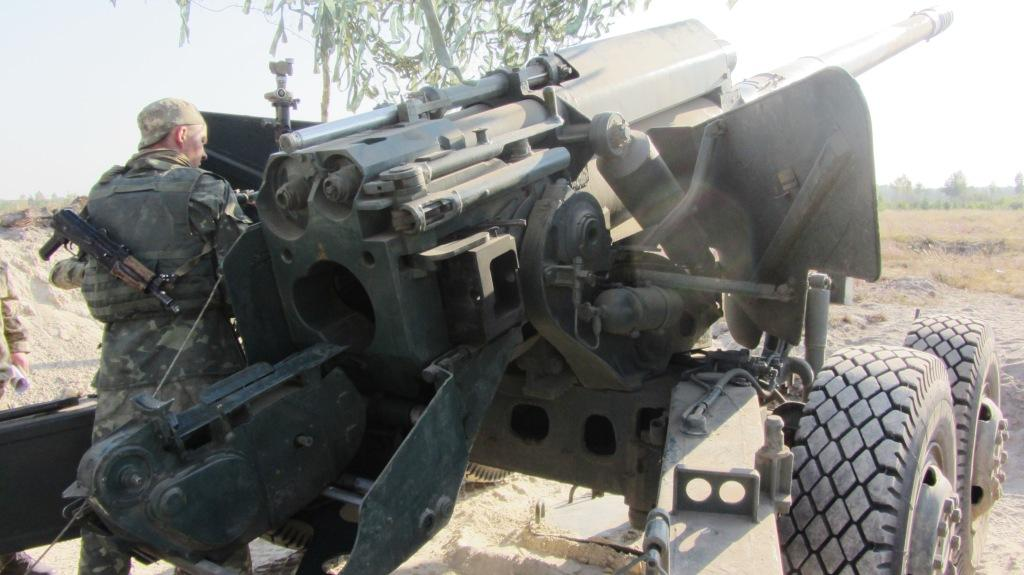
2A36 Giatsint-B gunners of the 44th Artillery Brigade.

As of 2017 the brigade's structure is as follows:

- 44th Artillery Brigade, Ternopil
  - Headquarters & Headquarters Battery
  - 1st Howitzer Artillery Battalion (2A65 Msta-B)
  - 2nd Howitzer Artillery Battalion (2A36 Hyacinth-B)
  - 3rd Howitzer Artillery Battalion (2A36 Hyacinth-B)
  - 4th Self-propelled Artillery Battalion (2S7 Pion)
  - 5th Anti-tank Artillery Battalion (MT-12 Rapira)
  - Artillery Reconnaissance Battalion
  - 6th Guard Battalion "Zbruch"
  - Engineer Company
  - Maintenance Company
  - Logistic Company
  - Chemical, biological, radiological and nuclear defense CBRN-defense Platoon
  - Band of the 44th Artillery Brigade
