= Ihor Dovhan =

- Ігор Андрійович Довгань
- Born: Ihor Andriyovych Dovhan; 2 August 1966 (age 60); Soviet Union
- Military career
- Allegiance: Ukraine
- Branch: Ukrainian Ground Forces
- Service years: ????-present
- Rank: Lieutenant general
- Conflicts: Russo-Ukrainian war

Ihor Andriyovych Dovhan (Ukrainian: Ігор Андрійович Довгань; born 2 August 1966), is a Ukrainian army officer who served as the commander of the Operational Command West from 2015 to 2017.

== Biography ==
Ihor Dovhan was born on 2 August 1966.

In December 2012, Colonel Dovhan became the Deputy Chief of Staff of the 6th Guards Army Corps of the Ground Forces of the Armed Forces of Ukraine.

in August 2014, Dovhan was promoted as a major general.

In May 2015, Dovhan became the commander of the Operational Command West. In December 2016, he was promoted to lieutenant general.

On 23 March 2017, he was dismissed and had been replaced by his successor, Oleksandr Pavlyuk.

On 7 March 2019, he became the chief of staff is the first deputy commander of the Ground Forces of the Armed Forces of Ukraine.

As of 2021, he is the Chief of the Joint Staff of the Command of the Joint Defense Forces of the Armed Forces of Ukraine.

On 2 July 2024, the Russian government placed Dovhan in a wanted list.
