= Luhanske =

Luhanske (Ukrainian: Луганське) may refer to the following places in Ukraine:

- Luhansk, formerly named as Luhanske, a major city in Eastern Ukraine and the administrative centre of Luhansk Oblast
- Luhanske, Crimea, a village in Dzhankoi Raion, Crimea
- Luhanske, Bakhmut Raion, Donetsk Oblast, an urban-type settlement in Bakhmut Raion, Donetsk Oblast
- Luhanske, Kalmiuske Raion, Donetsk Oblast, a village in Kalmiuske Raion, Donetsk Oblast
- Luhanske, Zaporizhzhia Oblast, a village in Polohy Raion, Zaporizhzhia Oblast
