= 104th Territorial Defense Brigade =

Ukrainian Territorial Defense Forces unit

- Ukrainian: 104-та окрема бригада територіальної оборони
- Active: 27 June 2018 – present
- Country: Ukraine
- Branch: Armed Forces of Ukraine
- Type: Military reserve force
- Role: Light infantry
- Part of: Territorial Defense Forces; Operational Command West
- Garrison/HQ: Rivne Oblast; MUN А7032
- Engagements: Russo–Ukrainian War: 2022 Russian invasion of Ukraine; Kursk offensive (2024–2025)
- Website: Official website

Commanders
- Commander Lt.Col. Serhii Kasprov: Governor Oleksandr Koval

Insignia
- Flag

The 104th Territorial Defense Brigade (Ukrainian: 104-та окрема бригада територіальної оборони) is a military formation of the Territorial Defense Forces of Ukraine in Rivne Oblast. It is part of Operational Command West.

== History ==
=== Formation ===
In May 2018, governor of Rivne Oblast Oleksiy Mulyarenko and commander of Operational Command West Major General Oleksandr Pavlyuk were tasked with control of creation of Brigade. Tsys Oleksandr became first commander of the Brigade. He announced that brigade will have about 3500 troops, mostly reservists, who will have yearly training exercises. On 27 June 2018 the brigade was formed in Rivne Oblast.

In November 2018, between 200 and 300 reservists from Varash and 9 neighboring raions, gathered at a shooting range. Also they conducted tactical, medical and engineering exercises. In December, Brigade along with neighboring brigades, held joint combat readiness exercises conducted by join Ukrainian and British instructors.

Between 17 and 23 May 2019, Brigade held staff officer exercises. They included planning combat and special operations, marches, supply issues.

On 8 October 2019, 61st Territorial Defense Battalion held combat readiness exercise for more than 200 soldiers.

From 22 to 30 September 2021, strategic command and staff exercises Joint Efforts-2021 were held in Ukraine. Brigade took part in it along with about 12,500 troops and troops from 15 countries, including 11 NATO member countries.

=== Russo-Ukrainian War ===
==== 2022 Russian invasion of Ukraine ====
2 days after invasion, more than 1000 people joined the Brigade. As Belarusian Armed Forces continue exercises near Ukrainian border, on 8 June 2022 units of brigade held exercisers on how to capture a convoy and how to defend against enemy ambush.

On 6 June 2023 Colonel Oleksandr Tsys was replaced by Lieutenant Colonel Serhii Kasprov who previously commanded 251st Territorial Defense Battalion.

During June 2023, the brigade's 60th Battalion participated in combat operations near the village of Ozarianivka near Bakhmut.

In mid-September 2024, units of the 104th Brigade reportedly participated in a battle in the village of Obukhovka, as part of the Ukrainian operation in Russia's Kursk Oblast.

== Structure ==
As of 2022 the brigade's structure is as follows:

- 104th Territorial Defense Brigade
  - Headquarters
  - 56th Territorial Defense Battalion (Rivne) MUN А7065
  - 57th Territorial Defense Battalion (Dubno) MUN А7069
  - 58th Territorial Defense Battalion (Zdolbuniv) MUN А7070
  - 59th Territorial Defense Battalion (Kostopil) MUN А7071
  - 60th Territorial Defense Battalion (Sarny) MUN А7072
  - 61st Territorial Defense Battalion (Volodymyrets) MUN А7073
  - Counter-Sabotage Company
  - Engineering Company
  - Communication Company
  - Logistics Company
  - Mortar Battery

== Commanders ==
- Colonel Oleksandr Tsys 2018 - 6 June 2023
- Lieutenant Colonel Serhii Kasprov 6 June 2023 - present

== See also ==
- Territorial Defense Forces of the Armed Forces of Ukraine
