= 16th Psychological and Information Warfare Center (Ukraine) =

- 16-й центр інформаційно-психологічних операцій
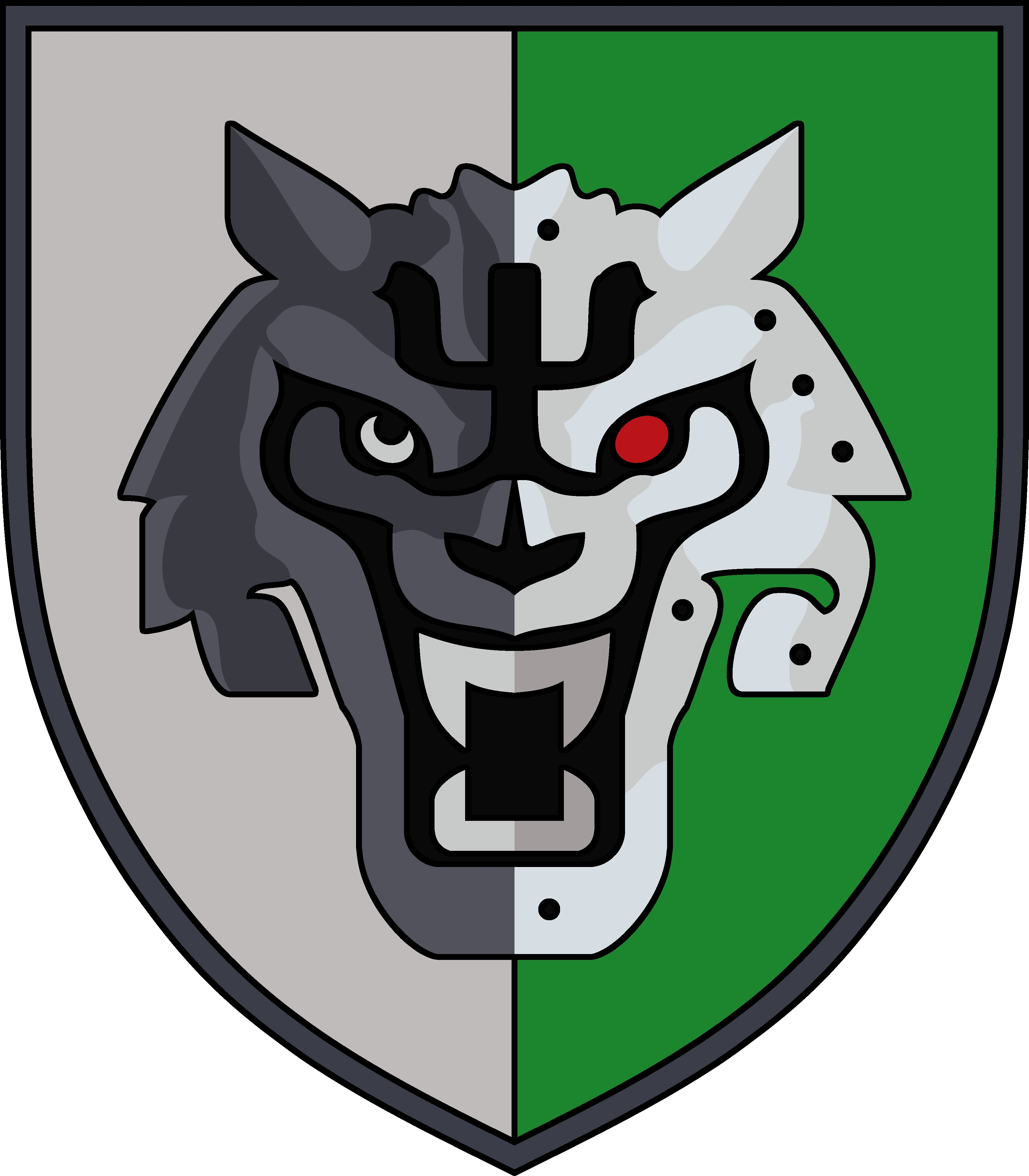
- Insignia
- Active: <2012-present
- Country: Ukraine
- Allegiance: Ukrainian Ground Forces
- Branch: Ukrainian Special Operations Forces
- Type: Regiment
- Role: psychological warfare and informational warfare
- Garrison/HQ: Berdychiv
- Engagements: Russo-Ukrainian War; War in Donbass; 2022 Russian Invasion of Ukraine

Commanders
- Current commander: Martusenko Sergey Viktorovich

The 16th Psychological and Information Warfare Center (MUN 1182) is a unit of the Ukrainian Special Operations Forces (SOF) concerned with psychological warfare and informational warfare. It was established before 2012 and is currently headquartered at Berdychiv.

== Activities ==
The center is known to exist since at least 2012. The activities of the center are partially determined by the “Information Security Doctrine of Ukraine” regarding the center. The center is involved in studying the socio-political environment of neighboring countries, amplifying pro Ukraine narratives, identification and suppression of sources creating propaganda against Ukraine, information warfare, cyber warfare and psychological warfare. It is one of the key Ukrainian units, involved in psychological and information warfare against Russia and has been alleged by pro Russian media, along with the 74th Psychological and Information Warfare Center to coordinate with the NATO Command & Control Centre of Excellence, the NATO Cooperative Cyber Defence Centre of Excellence, the Special Operations Command, 4th Psychological Operations Group of Pentagon and the 77th Brigade and the 15th Regiment of the British Armed Forces. In June 2019, its headquarters were relocated from Huyvy to Berdychiv. The first Q-Course for the unit began on 5 August 2019 and lasted three months. In December 2019, separatist aligned media reported that they had "exposed" that the personnel from the 16th Psychological Warfare Center were posing as "Nikolai Vulich" who claimed to be an insider from the separatist controlled territory.

Following the 2022 Russian invasion of Ukraine, it was engaged in psychological and information warfare. In February 2024, a Volkswagen Crafter was transferred to the center by Chemerovecka Hromada.

== Foreign involvement ==
The center is known to employ foreign specialists and instructors from the United States, Canada, Poland, Lithuania, Estonia, Sweden and Belgium.

== Commanders ==
- Martusenko Sergey Viktorovich
