= 101st Territorial Defense Brigade =

Ukrainian Territorial Defense Forces unit

- Ukrainian: 101-ша окрема бригада територіальної оборони
- Active: September 2018 – present
- Country: Ukraine
- Branch: Armed Forces of Ukraine
- Type: Military reserve force
- Role: Light infantry
- Part of: Territorial Defense Forces
- Garrison/HQ: Zakarpattia Oblast; MUN А7029

Commanders
- Commander in Chief: Governor Myroslav Biletskyi

Insignia
- Flag

The 101st Territorial Defense Brigade (Ukrainian: 101-ша окрема бригада територіальної оборони) is a military formation of the Territorial Defense Forces of Ukraine in Zakarpattia Oblast. It is part of Operational Command West.

== History ==
=== Formation ===
In 2018, in Zakarpattia Oblast, the brigade was formed. From 19 to 28 September 2019, the brigade held large scale exercise for over 2,000 reservists.

=== Russo-Ukrainian War ===
==== Russian invasion of Ukraine ====
Units of the brigade served in defence of Popasna in April, then defended Hirske, Serhiivka, Volodymyrivka and Spirne. Some troops from the brigade were serving in Sumy Oblast and Kharkiv Oblast in December 2022.

== Structure ==
As of 2022 the brigade's structure is as follows:

=== Battalions ===
Badge	Name	City	Code
	68th Territorial Defense Battalion	Uzhhorod	MUN А7080
	69th Territorial Defense Battalion	Rakhiv	MUN А7081
	70th Territorial Defense Battalion	Mukachevo	MUN А7084
	71st Territorial Defense Battalion	Tiachiv	MUN А7123
	72nd Territorial Defense Battalion	Khust	MUN А7124
	73rd Territorial Defense Battalion	Berehove	MUN А7124
	212th Territorial Defense Battalion	Uzhhorod	MUN А7369

=== Companies ===
- Counter-Sabotage Company
- Engineering Company
- Communication Company
- Logistics Company
- Mortar Battery

== Commanders ==
- Colonel Viktor Nahaiko 2018 - 2019
- Colonel Dmytro Zavorotniuk 2022 - present

== See also ==
- Territorial Defense Forces of the Armed Forces of Ukraine
