= Operational Command West =

- Оперативне командування «Захід»
- Operational Command West Shoulder sleeve insignia (2020-)
- Founded: 1998
- Country: Ukraine
- Branch: Ukrainian Ground Forces
- Type: Military district
- Part of: Armed Forces of Ukraine
- Headquarters: Rivne

Commanders
- Current commander: Brigadier General Volodymyr Shvediuk

The Operational Command West (abbr. OC West, Ukrainian: Оперативне командування «Захід»; ОК «Захід») is a formation of the Ukrainian Ground Forces in western Ukraine. Its headquarters is located in Rivne.

== History ==
When Ukraine gained independence from the Soviet Union, there were three Military Districts on its territory. These were the Kyiv, Odessa and Carpathian Military Districts. In 1998, the Western Operational Command was created from the Carpathian Military District.

Map of the Operational Command West shown in dark green

By 1 July 2006, the Western Operational Command consisted of units directly subordinated to the command and to the 13th Army Corps. These units were:

- 7th Army Aviation Regiment
- 11th Artillery Brigade
- 15th Rocket Artillery Regiment
- 14th Mechanized Brigade
- 24th Mechanized Brigade
- 55th Communications Regiment
- 80th Airmobile Regiment
- 146th Reconnaissance and Command Center
- 59th Artillery Regiment
- 128th Mountain Infantry Brigade
- 703rd Engineering Regiment
- 704th Chemical Defense Regiment

In October 2013, Operational Command North was created in Rivne. The Western Operational Command's headquarters was moved to Lviv and disbanded in August 2015. In November 2013, the 80th Airmobile Regiment was upgraded to brigade strength. From the beginning of 2015, Operational Command North was moved to Chernihiv. Operational Command West headquarters remained in Rivne. Major General Ihor Dovhan led the command from 2015.

In October 2015, the 10th Separate Mountain Assault Brigade was formed in the command. During late January and early February 2016, units of Operational Command West participated in joint training exercises with British instructors in Rivne. On 5 February, the command was assigned responsibility for Ground Forces troops in Volyn, Zakarpattia, Ivano-Frankivsk, Lviv, Rivne, Ternopil, Khmelnytskyi, and Chernivtsi Oblasts. As of December of that year, it included the 10th Separate Mountain Assault Brigade, the 14th Separate Mechanized Brigade, 24th Separate Mechanized Brigade, 128th Separate Mountain Brigade, and 44th Separate Artillery Brigade. In March 2017, Major General Oleksandr Pavlyuk became commander of OC West after Dovhan was promoted to Deputy Commander of the Ground Forces for Combat Training.

== Organization ==
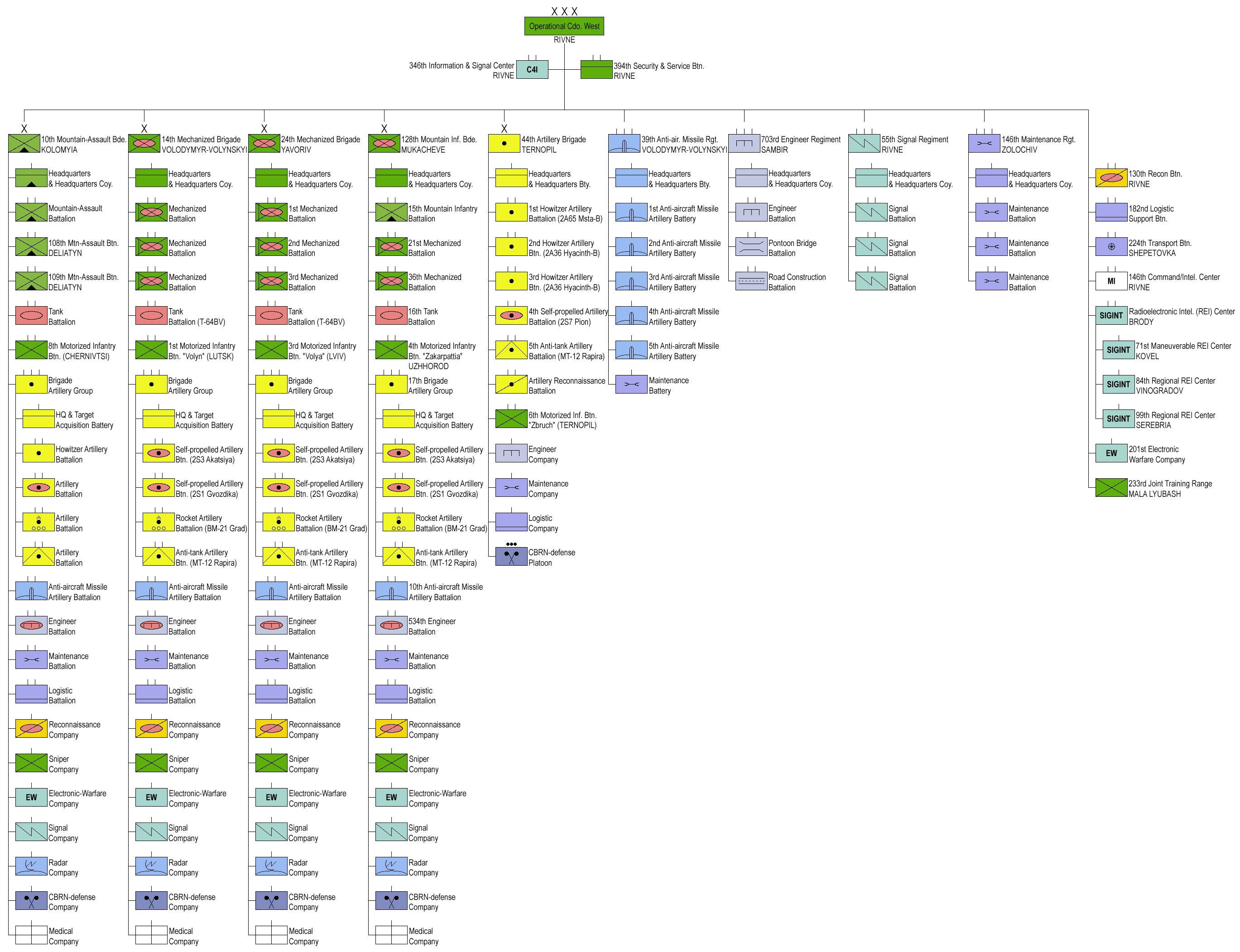
Structure of the Operational Command West in 2017 as per the best available Ukrainian language sources.

Operational Command West has operational command of ground force units in Volyn, Zakarpattia, Ivano-Frankivsk, Lviv, Rivne, Ternopil, Khmelnytskyi, and Chernivtsi oblasts.

- Operational Command West, in Rivne
  - 3rd Tank Brigade, in Yarmolyntsi
  - 10th Mountain Assault Brigade, in Kolomyia
  - 14th Mechanized Brigade, in Volodymyr
  - 22nd Mechanized Brigade, in Chernivtsi
  - 24th Mechanized Brigade, in Yavoriv
  - 33rd Mechanized Brigade, in Rivne
  - 42nd Mechanized Brigade, in Chortkiv
  - 63rd Mechanized Brigade, in Starokostyantyniv
  - 65th Mechanized Brigade, in Starychi
  - 68th Jaeger Brigade, in Uzhhorod
  - 88th Mechanized Brigade, in Rivne
  - 128th Mountain Assault Brigade, in Mukachevo
  - 44th Artillery Brigade, in Ternopil
  - 45th Artillery Brigade, in Yavoriv
  - 39th Anti-aircraft Missile Regiment, in Volodymyr
  - 55th Signal Regiment, in Rivne
  - 146th Maintenance Regiment, in Zolochiv
  - 703rd Support Brigade, in Sambir
  - 35th Rifle Battalion, in Ternopil
  - 36th Rifle Battalion, in Khmelnytskyi
  - 52nd Rifle Battalion, in Ivano-Frankivsk
  - 53rd Rifle Battalion
  - 130th Reconnaissance Battalion, in Dubno
  - 182nd Materiel Support Battalion, in Berezhany
  - 224th Transport Battalion, in Shepetivka
  - 394th Guard & Service Battalion, in Rivne
  - 146th Command & Intelligence Center, in Rivne
  - Regional Radioelectronic Intelligence (REI) Center, in Brody
    - 71st Maneuverable REI Center, in Kovel
    - 84th REI Center, in Vynohradiv
    - 99th REI Center, in Serebriya
  - 201st Electronic Warfare Company, in Rivne
  - 233rd Joint Training Range, in Mala Lyubash

=== Additional forces ===
The following formations of other branches of the Ukrainian Armed Forces, respectively the general staff of the Ukrainian ground forces, are based in the area of Operational Command West and can be assigned to the command as needed:

- Ground Forces:
  - 12th Army Aviation Brigade, in Novyi Kalyniv
  - 15th Artillery Reconnaissance Brigade, in Drogobych
  - 16th Army Aviation Brigade, in Brody
  - 19th Missile Brigade, in Khmelnytskyi
  - 47th Engineer Brigade, in Dubno
  - 48th Engineer Brigade, in Kamianets-Podilskyi
  - 211th Pontoon Bridge Brigade, in Ternopil
  - 704th CBRN Protection Brigade, in Sambir
- Air Assault Forces:
  - 80th Air Assault Brigade, in Lviv
  - 82nd Air Assault Brigade, in Chernivtsi
- Air Force:
  - 1st Radio Technical Brigade, in Lipniki
  - 11th Anti-aircraft Missile Regiment, in Shepetivka
  - 76th Communication Regiment, in Lipniki
  - 223rd Anti-aircraft Missile Regiment, in Stryi
  - 540th Anti-aircraft Missile Regiment, in Kamianka-Buzka
  - 17th Electronic Warfare Battalion, in Kolomyia
  - 352nd Airfield Engineer Battalion, in Khmelnytskyi
- Special Operations Forces:
  - Special Operations Center West, in Khmelnytskyi (former 8th Special Forces Regiment)
  - 140th Special Forces Center, in Khmelnytskyi
  - 74th Information and Psychological Operations Center, in Lviv
- Territorial Defense Forces
  - 100th Territorial Defence Brigade "Volyn"
  - 101st Territorial Defence Brigade "Zakarpattia"
  - 102nd Territorial Defence Brigade "Ivano-Frankivsk"
  - 103rd Territorial Defence Brigade "Lviv"
  - 104th Territorial Defence Brigade "Rivne"
  - 105th Territorial Defence Brigade "Ternopil"
  - 106th Territorial Defence Brigade "Khmelnytskyi"
  - 107th Territorial Defence Brigade "Chernivtsi"
  - 125th Territorial Defence Brigade "Lviv City"
  - 2nd Infantry Battalion "Volyn"
  - 5th Infantry Battalion "Zakarpattia"
  - 7th Infantry Battalion "Ivano-Frankivsk"
  - 10th Infantry Battalion "Lviv"
  - 14th Infantry Battalion "Rivne"
  - 16th Infantry Battalion "Ternopil"
  - 19th Infantry Battalion "Khmelnytskyi"
  - 21st Infantry Battalion "Chernivtsi"

== Commanders ==
- Colonel General Serhiy Chernilevsky (1998–1999)
- Colonel General Mykola Petruk (2003–2004)
- Lieutenant General Mykhailo Kutsyn (2004–2010)
- Lieutenant General Yuriy Dumansky (26 April 2010 – 10 May 2012)
- Major General Viktor Hanushchak (10 May 2012 - 29 October 2013; acting)
- Major General Ihor Dovhan (May 2015 – March 2017)
- Major General Oleksandr Pavlyuk (March 2017 – April 2020)
- Major General Serhiy Shaptala (April 2020 - August 2021)
- Major General Serhiy Litvinov (August 2021 - April 2024)
- Brigadier General Volodymyr Shvediuk (April 2024 - )

=== Chiefs of staff ===
- Major General Viktor Hanushchak (December 2009 - 10 May 2012)
- Major General Valerii Zaluzhnyi (2017)
- Major General Volodymyr Myronyuk (2019)
- Colonel Oleksandr Seletsky (2019 — 2020, acting)

=== Deputy Commanders ===
- Major General Oleh Mikats (March 2017 - 9 August 2021)
