= Serhiy Chernilevsky =

Ukrainian military officer (born 1945)

- Сергій Володимирович Чернілевський
- Born: Serhiy Volodymyrovych Chernilevsky; 30 October 1945 (age 80); Hryshky, Ukraine, Soviet Union
- Military career
- Allegiance: Soviet Union; Ukraine
- Branch: Ukrainian Ground Forces
- Rank: Colonel general
- Commands: Operational Command South (1999-2003)

Colonel General Serhiy Volodymyrovych Chernilevsky (Ukrainian: Сергій Володимирович Чернілевський; born 30 October 1945) is a Ukrainian army officer who served as the 1st Commander of the Operational Command West from 1998 to 2003.

== Biography ==
Serhiy Chernilevsky was born on 30 October 1945 in Hryshky in Khmelnytskyi Oblast.

In 1967, he graduated from the Kyiv higher military command school named after Mikhail Frunze.

From 1967 to 1974, he served in the Transbaikal and Odesa military districts as a machine gun platoon commander, secretary of the VLKSM battalion committee, machine gun company commander, motorized rifle battalion commander.

After graduating from the Frunze Military Academy in 1977, he was in the Baltic Military District as the chief of staff — deputy commander of a regiment, then the commander of a motorized rifle regiment, and then the deputy commander of a motorized rifle division.

From April 1985 to August 1987, he was the commander of the 26th Guards Motorized Rifle Division.

After graduating from the Military Academy of the General Staff in 1989, he was appointed to the post of Chief of Staff — First Deputy Commander of the 3rd Army.

In September 1991, he has been the Deputy Commander-in-Chief of the troops of the Western direction.

In September 1993, Chernilevsky served as the deputy commander of the Odesa Military District.

In February 1998, he was the first deputy commander.

In October 1998, Chernilevksy became the first commander Operational Command West.

In April 1999, he was named in "Organizational committee for preparation and implementation events dedicated to the 60th anniversary of Ukrainian reunification lands in the unified Ukrainian state" as part of the celebration of the 60th anniversary of Ukrainian statehood.

On 14 October 2003, he has been dismissed by the Minister of Defense, and has been replaced by Mykola Petruk.

In March 2004, he was discharged from the ranks of the Armed Forces of Ukraine to the reserve.

== Family ==
He has brothers and sisters. His older brother, Dmytro (1934-2018), was the doctor of Pedagogical Sciences, professor, president of the Academy of International Cooperation in Creative Pedagogy

He has other brothers and sisters, Valentyn, Mykolay, Anatoliy, Lyobov, and Tetyana.
