= 74th Psychological and Information Warfare Center (Ukraine) =

- 74-й центр інформаційно-психологічних операцій
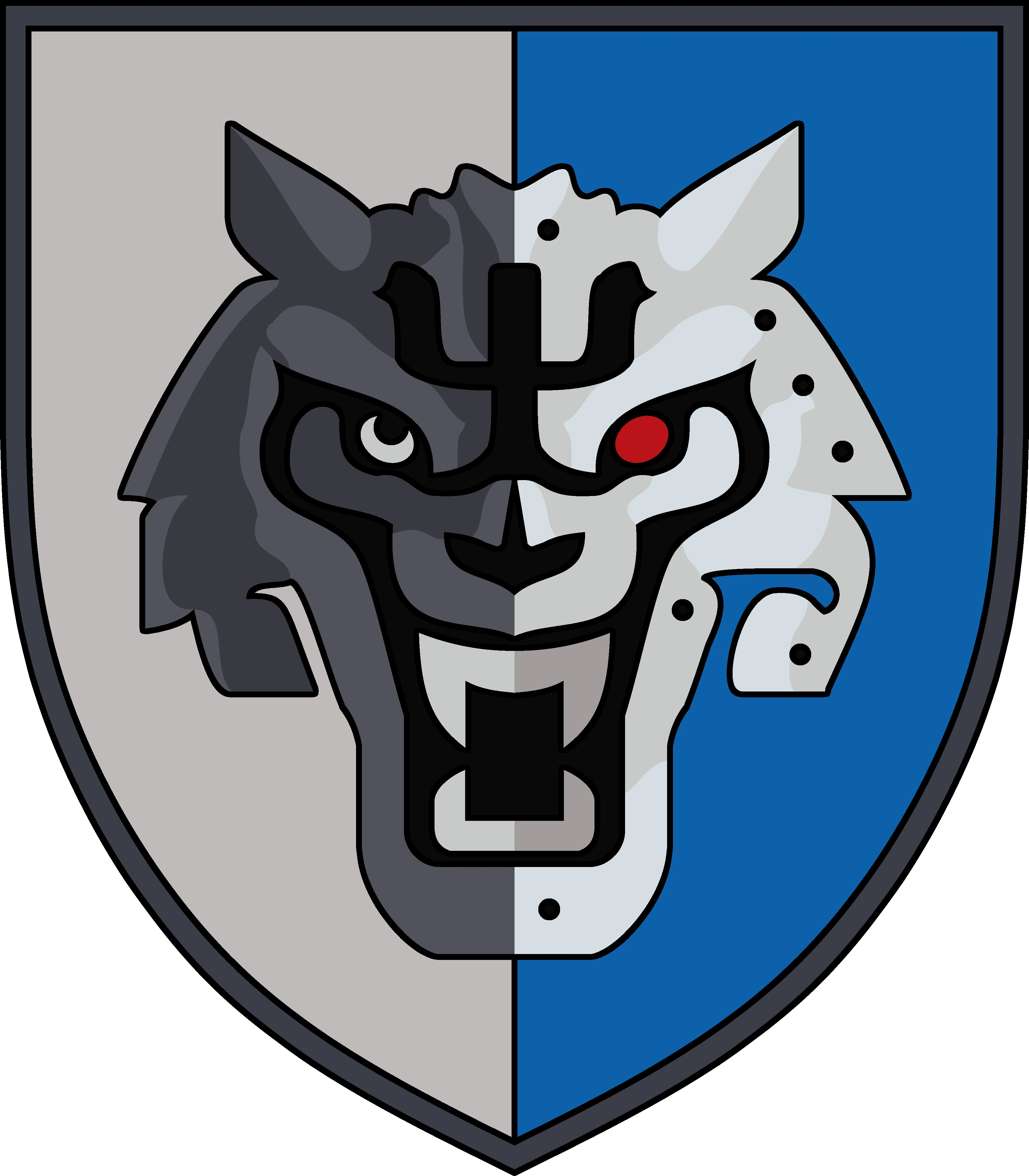
- Insignia
- Active: <2012-present
- Country: Ukraine
- Allegiance: Ukrainian Ground Forces
- Branch: Ukrainian Special Operations Forces
- Type: Regiment
- Role: psychological warfare and informational warfare
- Part of: Operational Command West
- Garrison/HQ: Lviv
- Engagements: Russo-Ukrainian War; War in Donbass; 2022 Russian Invasion of Ukraine

Commanders
- Current commander: Alexander Petrovich Sergienko

The 74th Psychological and Information Warfare Center (MUN A1277) is a unit of the Ukrainian Special Operations Forces (SOF) concerned with psychological warfare and informational warfare. It was established before 2012 and is currently headquartered at Lviv.

== History ==
The center is known to exist since at least 2012. It is tasked with collection and analysis of information, dissemination of propaganda and social engineering. In addition to normal SSO regulations, its activities are partially determined by the "Information Security Doctrine of Ukraine" approved on 25 February 2017. It is one of the key Ukrainian units, involved in psychological and information warfare against Russia and has been alleged by pro Russian media, along with the 16th Psychological and Information Warfare Center to coordinate with the NATO Command & Control Centre of Excellence, the NATO Cooperative Cyber Defence Centre of Excellence, the Special Operations Command, 4th Psychological Operations Group of Pentagon and the 77th Brigade and the 15th Regiment of the British Armed Forces.

Following the start of the War in Donbass, it saw direct action at the frontlines since the start. On 16 January 2016, a chaplain blessed the headquarters of the center. In May 2017, the National Liberation Movement of Moldova alleged that the 74th Center was attempting to organize anti-Russian provocations during Victory Day ceremonies and was propagating anti-Russian "propaganda" using social media and internet platforms. In January 2020, separatist aligned media reported that the center was allegedly disseminating "propaganda about low social security" in separatist held territory and also about inadequate quarantine and health measures in the separatist held territory during the COVID-19 pandemic. Also in January 2020, it signed an agreement with Blueberry LLC to monitor anti-Ukraine narratives in American and European media networks including Facebook, Twitter, Instagram and YouTube. In September 2020, some personnel of the center went to receive training in Lithuania. "Luhansk People's Republic" officials alleged in November 2021, that the center filmed "propaganda material" in the theaters of operation of the 30th, 24th and 57th brigades with the involvement of Ukrainian and international media.

Following the 2022 Russian invasion of Ukraine, it was engaged in psychological and information warfare.

== Structure ==
Its structure includes:

- 74th Psychological and Information Warfare Center
  - Management & Headquarters
  - Analytical Department
  - Telecommunications network department
  - Printed Propaganda Department
  - Surveillance and Special Actions Department
    - Consolidated Propaganda Group
    - information support group
  - Automobile Unit
  - Logistics

== Commanders ==
- Commander: Lieutenant Colonel Alexander Petrovich Sergienko
- Chief of staff: Lieutenant Colonel Shainoga Maryan Andreevich
