= Serhiy Litvinov =

- Сергій Петрович Літвінов
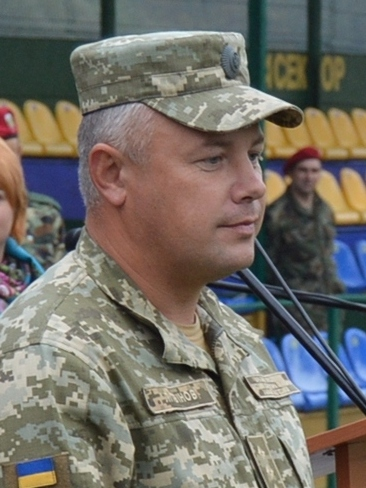
- Litvinov in September 2017
- Born: Serhiy Petrovych Litvinov; 29 June 1978 (age 48); Soviet Union
- Military career
- Allegiance: Ukraine
- Branch: Ukrainian Ground Forces
- Service years: ????-present
- Rank: Major general
- Conflicts: Russo-Ukrainian war

Serhiy Petrovych Litvinov (Ukrainian: Сергій Петрович Літвінов; born on 29 June 1978), is a Ukrainian army officer who served as the commander of the Operational Command West from 2021 to 2024.

He had been the deputy commander of the Operational Command North for combat training in 2017.

He has also been the Commander of the 17th separate tank brigade from 2015 to 2016.

A major general as of 2022, Litvinov was included in the list of the 25 most influential Ukrainian military men from the Ministry of Defense as of October 2022, and at the age of 45.

== Biography ==
Serhiy Litvinov was born on 29 June 1978.

From 2015 to 2016, he was the commander of the 17th separate tank brigade.

In July 2017, he became the deputy commander of the troops of the Operational Command North for combat training. In September, he was the co-head of the Ukrainian-American command and staff exercise "Rapid Trident - 2017".

On 9 August 2021, the Minister of Defense appointed Litvinov as the commander of the Operational Command West.

On 10 February 2024, he was dismissed, and his place was taken by Brigadier General Volodymyr Shvedyuk on 4 April. At the same time, the Ground Forces Command of the Ukrainian Armed Forces announced that Major General Litvinov had been appointed deputy head of the National Defense University of Ukraine.
