= Viktor Hanushchak =

Ukrainian army officer

- Віктор Іванович Ганущак
- Born: Viktor Ivanovych Hanushchak; 4 March 1971 (age 55); Vinnytsia, Ukraine, Soviet Union
- Military career
- Allegiance: Ukraine
- Branch: Ukrainian Ground Forces
- Rank: Major general

Viktor Ivanovych Hanushchak (Ukrainian: Віктор Іванович Ганущак; born on 4 March 1971), is a Ukrainian army officer who is currently the Deputy Commander of the Joint Forces for the Use of Forces and Means of the National Guard of Ukraine since November 2018. He also served as the acting Commander of the Operational Command West in 2012.

Hanushchak was the head of the Eastern Territorial Command of the Internal Troops of the Ministry of Internal Affairs of Ukraine since 2013.

He was the commander of the Ukrainian peacekeeping contingent in Kosovo from 2001 to 2002.

== Biography ==
Viktor Hanushchak was born on 4 March 1971 in Vinnytsia.

In 1992, he graduated from the Far Eastern Higher Combined Arms Command School in Blagoveshchensk, and the National Defense Academy of Ukraine in 2000.

He served in positions from platoon commander to mechanized brigade commander. From July 2001 to August 2002, he headed the Ukrainian peacekeeping contingent in Kosovo.

In 2008, Hanushchak received the specialty: "Master of State Military Administration. Until December 2009, he was deputy head of the Main Logistics Department of the Support Forces Command of the Armed Forces of Ukraine.

From December 2009 to May 2012, he was Chief of Staff and First Deputy Commander of the Operational Command West of the Land Forces of the Armed Forces of Ukraine. On 10 May 2012, Hanushschak became the acting Commander of the Operational Command West.

On 29 October 2013, he was appointed Head of the Eastern Territorial Command of the Internal Troops of the Ministry of Internal Affairs of Ukraine.

In January 2017, Hanushchak, along with four other generals, joined the global flash mob #22PushupChallenge.

== Family ==
He is married and is raising a son and daughter.
