= 703rd Support Brigade (Ukraine) =

- 703-та окрема бригада підтримки
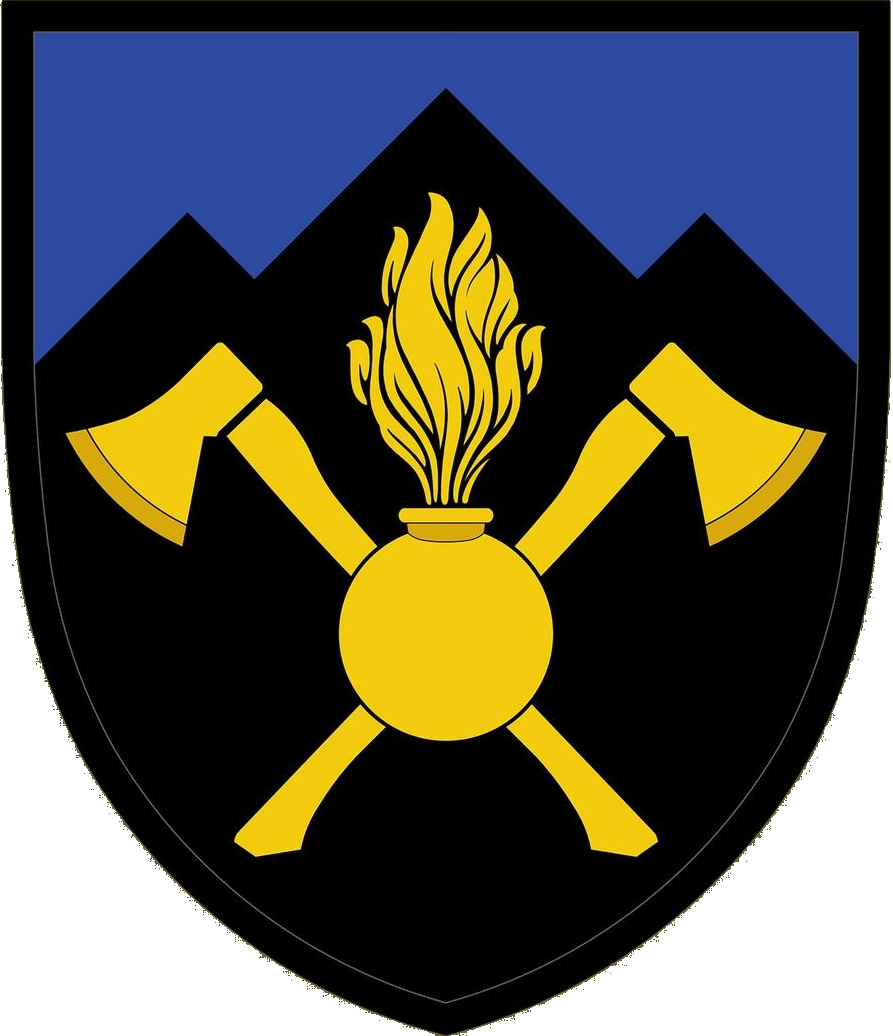
- Founded: 1992
- Country: Ukraine
- Branch: Ukrainian Ground Forces
- Type: Brigade
- Role: Support Forces
- Part of: Operational Command West
- Garrison/HQ: Sambir
- Motto: "Mens Et Manus"
- Engagements: United Nations peacekeeping; UNIFIL; UNAMI; Kosovo Force; Russo-Ukrainian War; War in Donbass; Russian invasion of Ukraine

The 703rd "Vinnytskyi" Support Brigade (MUN 3817) is a brigade level unit of the Ukrainian Ground Forces providing engineering, logistical and support services. It was established as a regiment, but was expanded to a brigade in 2024 and has seen extensive action during the War in Donbass and the Russian invasion of Ukraine, as well as several peacekeeping operations. It is headquartered at Sambir.

== History ==
In 1942, the 9th Separate Engineer Brigade was established in Krasnodar, was reorganized into the 3rd Engineer and Mine Brigade in February 1943, and later into the 15th Separate Assault Engineer and Mine Brigade. During the Second World War, it saw actions and deployments in the theaters from the foothills of the Caucasus to Carpathians, and then through Poland to Prague. In late 1947, the brigade was reorganized into the 50th Engineer Regiment which participated in the reconstruction of the post-war economic complex. After the Chernobyl disaster, the regiment was deployed to undertake liquidation measures.

Following the Dissolution of the Soviet Union, it came under the jurisdiction of Ukraine and in 1994, the 50th Engineer and Sapper Regiment was reorganized into the 10th Engineer and Sapper Brigade and again on 30 October 2003, the 10th Engineer and Sapper Brigade was reorganized into the 703rd Engineer Regiment. Its personnel participated in numerous peacekeeping operations such as UNIFIL, MNF-I and Kosovo Force, and also mitigated conditions of harsh weather and natural disasters in Lviv and neighboring regions. In 2008, it was transferred to contract service. In August–September 2008, the regiment was deployed for disaster relief in Chernivtsi Oblast, Ivano-Frankivsk Oblast, and Lviv Oblast. It installed 4 bridges with a carrying capacity over water and provided assistance to local population. In June 2010, it participated in the flood relief efforts in Chernivtsi Oblast installing two bridges.

Following the start of the War in Donbass, it was deployed to eastern Ukraine and saw heavy action. On 31 August 2014, six personnel of the regiment (Note: Bzhostovsky Igor Yevhenovych, Susky Vadim Mykolayovych, Shubak Igor Romanovych, Maletskyi Roman Mykhailovych, Strus Andriy Andriyovych and Doroshenko Volodymyr Pavlovych) were killed and four were wounded in Berdyanske near Mariupol by an IED blast on their vehicle. On 26 October 2014, while escorting a supply vehicle transporting food and water to the 32nd checkpoint, the regiment's BMR-2 was blown up by a landmine, with the driver shell-shocked, the warrant officer was able to evacuate him to the 31st checkpoint with the help of the National Guard.

External videos
- 1. На фугасі підірвалася бойова машина розмінування сил #АТО // 5 канал, 27 жовтня 2014

On 20 January 2015, another BMR-2 of the regiment carrying commander Bohdan Bavdys accompanied a column of the 93rd Mechanized Brigade near the Donetsk International Airport, hit a landmine near Spartak, following which it heavily shelled upon by separatists. The BMR-2 was able to evacuate under covering fire by the vehicles of the 93rd Brigade. In 2015, a combined detachment of the 703rd Engineer Regiment carried out engineering support tasks for roads, power lines, railway tracks, and fortifications, as well as demining and removing obstacles. On 26 January 2015, a BMR-2 of the regiment participated in the storming of the Zharkoye mine. The BMR rammed an anti-tank mine with one roller and managed to reach the planned bridge where the infantry began to regroup, the BMR moved over the minefield, detonating another anti-tank mine, anti-personnel mines, F-1 and RGD-5 grenades on "stretchers". The crew returned to the bridge, left the BMR near the bridge and went on the attack with the infantry, ultimately taking control of the mine at 2 A.M, later in early February, the same BMR crew, participated in combat in Logvinovo during the Battle of Debaltseve. The vehicle was damaged by shelling but the crew joined with infantry from other units knocking three tanks. On 24 April 2015, a soldier of the regiment (Miroshnyk Vyacheslav Volodymyrovych) died from his wounds, sustained earlier.

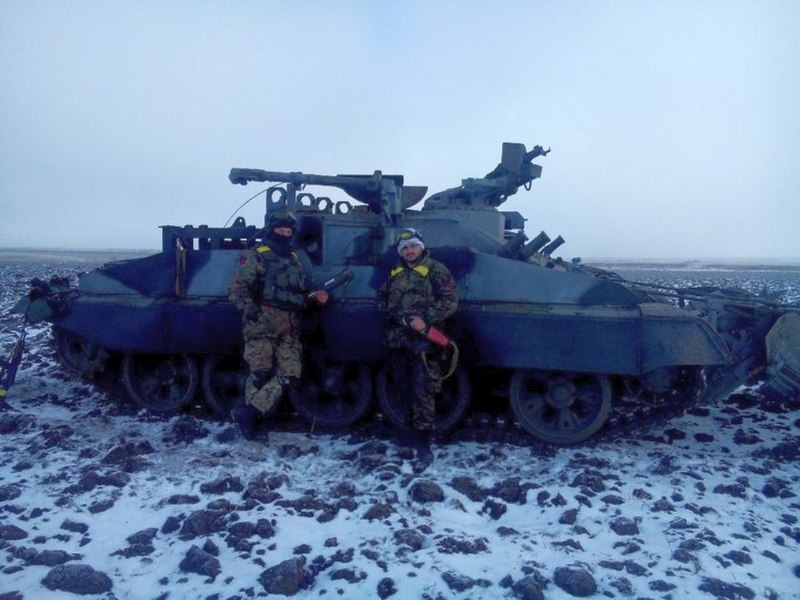
Personnel of the regiment during the War in Donbass

On 4 July 2015, a soldier of the regiment (Demkovsky Dmytro Mykhailovych) was killed by a landmine explosion near the 29th checkpoint on the Bakhmutka highway while attempting to evacuate a wounded serviceman of the regiment (Tsap Roman Petrovych) who was also killed, a second blast killed three more soldiers of other units. On 15 July 2015, while fortifying positions near Zolote, a soldier of the regiment fell into a trap made of fallen trees and was killed. On September 2, 2015, while servicing and repairing equipment, a soldier of the regiment (Boruta Vasyl Mykhailovych) was killed in Pokrovske. In 2015, the regiment was renamed the 703rd Separate Operational Support Regiment. A soldier of the regiment (Bezeiko Oleg Vasilyovych, foreman) was killed on 30 July 2016 in the village of Oleksandro-Kalynove. A soldier of the regiment (Andriy Myroslavovych Guk) died of his wounds on 24 September 2016 after being injured on 23 February 2015 by a guided mine in Stanytsia Luhanska.

Following the Russian invasion of Ukraine, it saw action. A soldier of the regiment (Andriy Slopak) was killed in mid 2023 during the Battle of Orikhiv as the regiment performed mining and demining tasks at the frontlines. In 2024, it was expanded to a brigade. A soldier of the brigade (Namisnyak Volodymyr) was killed on 28 March 2025 by artillery fire during the Pokrovsk offensive. Another soldier of the brigade (Vasyl Gerych) was killed on 17 June 2025 near Razine during Pokrovsk offensive.

== Equipment ==
Model	Image	Origin	Type	Number	Details
Vehicles
PZM-2		Soviet Union	Trencher		
PTS		Soviet Union	Tracked amphibious transport		
GMZ-3		Soviet Union	Minelayer		
BAT-2		Soviet Union	Military engineering vehicle		
IRM		Soviet Union	Combat engineering vehicle		
TMM-3M		Soviet Union	Truck launched bridge		
KrAZ-260		Soviet Union	Truck		
BMR-2		Soviet Union	Combat engineering vehicle		
Mazda Capella		Japan	Mid-size car		

== Command ==
- Colonel Slesarchuk Anatoliy Fedorovych (2004–2011)
- Colonel Korolev Oleksandr Oleksandrovich (2011–2018)

== Structure ==
- Management and Headquarters
- 1st Engineering Battalion
- 2nd Engineering Battalion
- Engineer-sapper Battalion
- Pontoon Bridge Battalion
- Road Engineering Battalion
- CBRN Defense Battalion
- Support Companies
- Commandant Platoon
