= 24th Mechanized Brigade (Ukraine) =

Ukrainian Ground Forces unit

24th Mechanized Brigade (2003–present) 24th Mechanized Division (c. 1992 – 2003) 24th Motor Rifle Division (1957 – c. 1992) 24th Rifle Division (Nov 1918 – 1957) 1st Simbirsk Infantry Division (26 Jul – Nov, 1918)
- Ukrainian: 24-та окрема механізована бригада імені короля Данила
- 24th Mechanized Brigade shoulder sleeve patch
- Active: 26 July 1918 – present
- Country: Soviet Russia (1918–1928); Soviet Union (1928–1991); Ukraine (1991–present)
- Branch: Ukrainian Ground Forces
- Type: Mechanized Infantry
- Size: Brigade
- Part of: Operational Command West (1 July 2006-present); 13th Army Corps (before 1 July 2006) (formerly Soviet 13th Army); 11th Army Corps
- Garrison/HQ: Yavoriv; MUN A0998
- Nicknames: Royal Infantry; Iron Brigade (former); Iron Division (former)
- Patron: King Danylo Halytskyi
- Mottos: "Milites Regum" "In Iron Division - iron soul, iron will and iron step." (former)
- Equipment: BMP-2, T-64
- Engagements: Russian Civil War; World War II; Winter War; Eastern Front; Russo-Ukrainian War; Invasion of Ukraine; Battle of Lysychansk; Battle of Bakhmut; Battle of Donbas
- Decorations: Order of the October Revolution (removed); Order of the Red Banner (3) (removed); Order of Suvorov (removed); Order of Bogdan Khmelnitsky (removed) For Courage and Bravery
- Battle honours: King Daniel of Galicia; Berdychiv (removed); Iron (removed); Prince Daniel of Galicia (removed); Samara (removed); Ulyanovsk (removed)

Commanders
- Current commander: Colonel Ivan Holishevskyi

The 24th Mechanized Brigade (Ukrainian: 24-та окрема механізована бригада, abbreviated 24 ОМБр) is a mechanized brigade of the Ukrainian Ground Forces, based at Yavoriv in the west of Ukraine.

The brigade, the oldest in continuous service within the Ground Forces, was originally formed as the 1st Simbirsk Infantry Division of Soviet Russia in 1918 during the Russian Civil War. The unit was soon renamed the 24th Rifle Division. It fought in the Winter War and World War II, during which it was destroyed during Operation Barbarossa.

Reformed without inheriting the lineage of the first formation, the second formation of the 24th gained the Berdychiv honorific for its actions during the Zhytomyr–Berdychiv offensive in late 1943, and was given the battle flag and traditions of the first formation in early 1944 to preserve historical continuity.

The division became a motor rifle division in 1957. The full name of the division was the 24th Samaro-Ulyanovsk Motor Rifle Berdychivska, Iron, Order of the October Revolution, Thrice Red Banner, Orders of Suvorov and Bohdan Khmelnytsky Division. In 1992, it was taken over by Ukraine and became the 24th Mechanized Division. In 2003, it was downsized to a brigade.

The brigade saw its first combat in almost 70 years during the war in Donbas from 2014. Its Soviet honorifics were progressively removed and replaced with the King Daniel of Galicia honorific following the beginning of the war in Donbas.

== History ==
=== Formation and early wars ===
The division was formed on the order of the Revolutionary Military Council of Soviet Russia on July 26, 1918, from voluntary groups under the name 1st Simbirsk Infantry Division. In November 1918 it was renamed as the 24th Simbirsk Rifle Division. It actively participated in the Russian Civil War in the Volga region, in the Southern Urals Mountains, and in Polissya and Volhynia. At this time one of its regimental commanders was a future Army General Maksim Purkayev.

In 1922 it was renamed as the 24th Samaro-Simbirsk Iron Rifle Division. In 1924 it was again renamed as the 24th Samaro-Ulyanovsk Iron Rifle Division. In 1939–1940, during the Russo-Finnish War the division distinguished itself during the breaking of the Mannerheim Line on the Karelian isthmus.

=== World War II ===
The division participated in fighting from the first days after the German invasion of the Soviet Union in 1941. The division staff showed mass heroism when the German opponents arrived in the Lidy area. It also took part in the Kyiv defensive operation, and as part of the 21st Rifle Corps and 13th Army, was involved in heavy defensive fighting in Belarus.

Reportedly because the divisional colours were lost in the Minsk area, it was disbanded on December 27, 1941. It was found out later that the instructor of the political department of the division, Senior Commissar A. V. Barbashev had the colour while the division was trying to break out of the German encirclement. Barbashev died on August 6, 1941, near Anyutino village Cherykaw District Mogilev Oblast. Local farmer D.N. Tyapin later found the stained Colour of the division on the officers corpse. He buried the body and the Colour in the local cemetery.

After the clearing of the village of Anyutino by the Red Army, the Divisional Colour was taken out of the cemetery and restored. On February 20, 1944, it was solemnly handed in a Presentation of Colours ceremony to the 24th Rifle Division (2nd formation). D.N. Tyapin was honoured for having found the division's Colour by being listed on the rolls of the 1st company of one of the division's regiments.

==== 2nd formation ====
The 24th Rifle Division was re-formed on 7 January 1942 by renumbering the 412th Rifle Division, which had been formed in Kirov Oblast as part of the Arkhangelsk Military District in December 1941 from the 48th Reserve Rifle Brigade. The 412th included the 1355th, 1357th, and 1358th Rifle Regiments in addition to the 1022nd Artillery Regiment and the 910th Separate Communications Battalions, along with smaller units. It was relocated to the southwestern part of Vologda Oblast before being renumbered as the 24th. The new division did not inherit the traditions of the Iron Division, although it reused the regimental numbers of the latter. Personnel from the 29th Reserve Rifle Brigade and the 385th Howitzer Artillery Regiment formed the new 24th along with others from the Arkhangelsk Military District.

During the war this division was part of armies in the Western, Kalinin, Stalingrad, Don, and Southwest fronts, from April until May 1944. In 1945 it was part of the 18th Army of the 4th Ukrainian Front.

The Division participated in the Battle of Stalingrad, the Donbas offensive operation, clearing of Left-bank Ukraine, in Zhytomyr–Berdychiv offensive, Kamianets–Podilskyi pocket, Lviv–Sandomierz offensive, East - Carpathian, Western - Carpathian, Moravia - Ostrava and the Prague offensive operations.

The division's combat actions finished on June 24, 1945, 100 km away from Prague. The last platoon of the division, led by Captain Klyuyev, took part in the Moscow Victory Parade of 1945.

On July 10, 1945, the division was disbanded, and its number given to the 294th Rifle Division, which became the 24th Rifle Division (3rd formation).

=== Cold War ===
In June 1957, the 24th Rifle Division became the 24th Motor Rifle Division. The redesignation occurred at Yavoriv, Lviv Oblast, Carpathian Military District, and the division, later brigade, has been based there since that date. On 21 February 1968, it was awarded the Order of the October Revolution.

Then-Major Igor Rodionov commanded a motorised rifle regiment in the division (the "Iron Division") in the Carpathian Military District from 1970 to 1973.

In 1982, the division was to be upgraded to an army corps (on the lines of the 5th Guards and 48th Guards in Belorussia and the Transbaikal), but the plans were cancelled. The division was used as a testbed for new equipment.

By the late 1980s the division's honorific titles included "Samaro-Ylyanovskaya, Zheleznaya, Berdichevskaya, four times Red Banner orders of the October Revolution, Suvorov and Bogdan Khmelnitskiy Motorised Rifle Division."

=== Part of the Ukrainian Armed Forces ===
After the disintegration of the Soviet Union the division became part of the Ukrainian Ground Forces. On April 19, 2001, by the decree of Leonid Kuchma N 268/2001, the division was awarded the designation Daniel of Halych. In 2003 the division was redesignated as 24th Mechanized Brigade "Daniel of Galicia".

The brigade fought in the war in Donbas in 2014 and 2015. In September 2014 elements of the brigade were alleged to have abandoned their positions after suffering heavy losses. On 18 November 2015, the brigade's full title was shortened to remove Soviet awards and honorifics, and it became the 24th Berdichev Iron Mechanized Brigade "Prince Daniel of Galicia". On 23 August 2017, the honorifics were changed, with the brigade dropping the remaining Soviet titles and becoming the 24th Mechanized Brigade "King Daniel of Galicia".

In February 2016, soldiers of the brigade's 1st Battalion conducted training with American, Canadian and Lithuanian instructors in Lviv.

In 2018 the brigade fought again in the war in Donbas and was stationed on the frontline near Horlivka.

As of December 2019, 152 soldiers of the brigade were killed during the war in Donbas.

=== Russian invasion of Ukraine ===
From the start of the invasion the 24th Mechanized Brigade was involved in numerous engagements against the Russian Army, the Wagner Group, and the separatists of the Donetsk People's Republic and the Luhansk People's Republic such as the battle of Lysychansk and the battle of Donbas.

Colonel Valery Hudz, the commander of the brigade, was killed in action in Luhansk Oblast on 12 March 2022. The 24th Brigade held the defense of Popasna in Luhansk Oblast until April 2022, at which point the Ukrainian military withdrew from the city. After Popasna, the brigade held the defense of Zolote, Sievierodonetsk and Lysychansk. It was later sent to Kherson Oblast to participate in the Ukrainian counteroffensive there. It took part in the defense of Soledar and Bakhmut. As of January 2024, was stationed on the Horlivka front in Donetsk Oblast, where it took part in the defense of Toretsk and Niu-York. The brigade was transferred from Toretsk and Niu-York to take part in the defense of Chasiv Yar.

On March 2, 2025, the brigade acquired Véhicule de l'Avant Blindé APCs.

== Order of battle ==
=== Russo-Finnish War ===
- 7th Rifle Regiment
- 168th Rifle Regiment
- 274th Rifle Regiment
- 246th Guards Artillery Regiment
- 160th Reconnaissance Battalion
- 315th Separate Armor Battalion

=== Late Soviet period c. 1988 ===
- 181st Tank Regiment
- 7th Motor Rifle Regiment (Lvov)
- 310th Motor Rifle Regiment (Rava-Russkaya)
- 274th Motor Rifle Regiment
- 849th Self-Propelled Artillery Regiment
- 257th Guards Anti-Aircraft Rocket Regiment

=== 2000 ===
- 181st Separate Armor Regiment
- 7th Mechanized Regiment
- 274th Mechanized Regiment
- 310th Mechanized Regiment
- 56th Signal Battalion
- 29th Separate Reconnaissance Battalion
- 30th Chemical Battalion
- 306th Engineer Battalion
- 849th Artillery Regiment
- 396th Combat Service Support Battalion

=== 2023 ===
- Headquarters & Headquarters Company, Yavoriv
- 1st Mechanized Battalion
- 2nd Mechanized Battalion
- 3rd Mechanized Battalion "Iron Bulls"
- 3rd Motorized Battalion
- 24th Tank Battalion
- 24th Field Artillery Regiment
  - Headquarters & Target Acquisition Battery
  - Self-propelled Artillery Battalion (2S3 Akatsiya)
  - Self-propelled Artillery Battalion (2S1 Gvozdika)
  - Rocket Artillery Battalion (BM-21 Grad)
  - Anti-tank Artillery Battalion (MT-12 Rapira)
- 24th Anti-Aircraft Defense Artillery Battalion
- Unmanned Strike Aviation Systems Battalion "Raróh". Established in April 2023.
- Combat Engineer Battalion
- Maintenance Battalion
- Logistics Battalion
- Reconnaissance Company
- Sniper Company
- Electronic Warfare Company
- Signal Company
- Radar Company
- Chemical, Biological, Radiological and Nuclear Defense Company
- Medical Company
- Brigade Band

== Traditions ==
=== Symbols ===
In 2017, the brigade developed a symbolism and motto: "Milites Regum" (translated from Latin: "King's infantry"). The motto is in Latin, the classic language of heraldry, and is connected to the life of King Daniel, for his coronation was held according to the Catholic coronation rites in Dorohochyn. On 10 November 2017, the official description of the new brigade symbols was published. The emblem is a shield that is red on one side and green on the other, with the lion, the main symbol of the brigade, in the center.

=== Unofficial anthem ===
In October 2014, The Vyo vocalist Myroslav Kuvaldin and other volunteers visited the Luhansk region where they talked to soldiers of the brigade. As a result of the visit, Kuvaldin decided to write an unofficial anthem for the brigade.

=== Museum ===
The Museum of the History of the Troops of the Carpathian Military District (Ukrainian: Музей історії військ Прикарпатського військового округу) is a military history museum in Lviv depicting the history of the Soviet-era district, being located on Stryjska Street on the territory of the 7th Regiment of the 24th Mechanized Brigade. It was inaugurated on 7 May 1965 on the eve of the celebrations of the 20th anniversary of the end of the Second World War. In 1995, due to lack of funds for the maintenance of the museum, the district authorities put it up for sale, and in 1999 a multi-story hotel was to be built there. Upon construction ending at the request of members of the Lviv City Council, Lieutenant General Petro Shulyak decided to transfer the funds of the former museum to the premises of the Iron Division Museum.

=== Honours and awards ===
- 1918 - awarded Honorable banner of Supreme Soviet
- On September, 28th 1918 awarded the Revolutionary Red Banner of Honor
- On December, 13th 1920 was given the honorable name "Samara"
- On October, 25th 1921 was given the honorable name "Iron"
- 1928 awarded the Revolutionary Red Banner of Honor
- On February, 1st 1933 received the Order of the Red Banner
- On April, 11th 1940 received the Order of the Red Banner (for operations in Winter War)
- January 1944 has received the honorable name «Berdychivskaya»
- 1944 received Order of Suvorov of 2nd class (for clearing of the city of Chernivtsi)
- 1944 received Order of Bohdan Khmelnytsky 2nd degree (for an output(exit) in foothills of Carpathian mountains)
- October 5, 1967, received the Order of the Red Banner
- 1978 received the Order of the October Revolution
- On May 19, 2001, awarded Danylo of Halych designation.
- On August 23, 2017, awarded King Daniel of Galicia designation.
- On May 6, 2022, received honorary citation "For Courage and Bravery"

=== Individual honors upon personnel ===
- 17 soldiers of the division were awarded Gold Star of the Hero of the Soviet Union.
- About 9,000 of the Division's soldiers received state awards and medals of the Soviet Union for individual conduct for service to the country in the Second World War

== Notable personnel ==
Notable division personnel included:

- Chairman of the Supreme body of USSR Nikolai Shvernik
- The marshal of Soviet Union Ivan Stepanovich Konev
- 6 generals of army, 2 commanders of 2-nd rank, 11 general-colonels, 25 general-lieutenants, 68 general-majors.
- Igor Rodionov, later Russian Defence Minister - during Soviet period as 24th Motor Rifle Division
- Defector 'Viktor Suvorov' (Viktor Rezun)

== Commanders ==
- G. Dmitrievich Guy - July 27 – November 20, 1918
- Pavlovskiy V. I. - November 20, 1918 – February 2, 1919
- Vilymson E. F. - February 2 – April 25, 1919
- Myretov M. V. - April 25–30, 1919
- Pavlovskiy V. I. - April 30, 1919 – July 21, 1920
- Myretov M. V. - July 21, 1920 – January 11, 1921
- Colonel Vasiliev - January 1938 -
- Major Filipp Fedorovich Alyabushev - August–December 1936
- Colonel Pyotr Yevgenyevich Veshchev - June 1938 – December 6, 1939 (KIA)
- Major General Kuzma Galitsky - December 23, 1939 – July 1941 Galitsky's order of withdrawal of command was dated on 26 December 1941, but he had been in other positions since July.
- Major General Terenty Batsanov - 15 July – 20 September 1941
- Major General Fedor Alexandrovich Prohorov January 1, 1942 – May 11, 1945
- Major general Mykhailo Kutsyn 1996–1999
- Colonel Volodymyr Kysilyov 1999–2001
- Major general Ihor Ostapenko 2002–2004
- Lieutenant colonel Oleksiy Zheleznyk 2004–2005
- Lieutenant colonel Lendar Kharakhalil - July 12, 2007
- Colonel Volodymyr Trunovskyi July 12, 2007 – 2010
- Colonel Oleksandr Pavliuk 2010–2015
- Colonel Anatoliy Shevchenko February 2015 – August 2017
- Colonel Valeriy Hudz December 2017 - August 2020 (KIA in 2022)
- Colonel Serhiy Postupalskyi October 2020 - March 2022 (WIA)
- Colonel Roman Mamavko March 2022 – September 2022
- Colonel Ivan Holishevskyi September 2022 - present
