= Ivan Holishevskyi =

- Іван Леонідович Голішевський
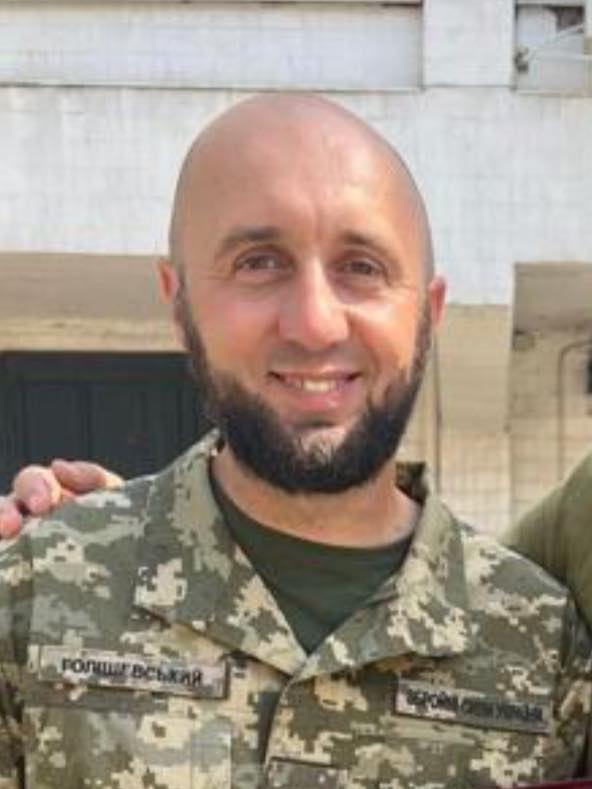
- Born: 1988 (age 37–38) village of Novoselitsa Popilnyanskyi, now Zhytomyr Raion, Zhytomyr Oblast
- Military career
- Allegiance: Ukraine
- Branch: Ukrainian Ground Forces
- Rank: colonel
- Conflicts: Russo-Ukrainian War; War in Donbass; 2022 Russian invasion of Ukraine
- Awards: Order of the Gold Star

Ivan Leonidovych Holishevskyi (Ukrainian: Іван Леонідович Голішевський; 1988, the village of Novoselitsa Popilnyanskyi, now Zhytomyr Raion, Zhytomyr Oblast) is a colonel of the Armed Forces of Ukraine, commander of the 24th mechanized brigade (2023). Commander of the 15th Separate Mountain Assault Battalion (2022). Participant in the Russian-Ukrainian war, repelling the Russian invasion of Ukraine in 2022. Hero of Ukraine (2022).

== Biography ==
In February–March 2022, the 15th separate mountain assault battalion under the command of Lt. Col. Ivan Golishevsky defended the settlement of Kreminna and stopped the advance of the enemy in the Krasnorichenske - Kreminna direction. Thanks to the organized defense of the border by the battalion and attached units, the advance of the overwhelming enemy forces was stopped. The armed forces of the Russian Federation suffered significant losses of personnel and equipment.

In August 2022, he was awarded the title of Hero of Ukraine

As of December 2022, he was the commander of the 24th mechanized brigade.

== Awards ==
On 26 March 2022, he was awarded the highest national title of Ukraine, Hero of Ukraine, with Order of the Gold Star.
