= 125th Heavy Mechanized Brigade =

Ukrainian Territorial Defense Forces unit

125th Heavy Mechanized Brigade (2025–present) 125th Territorial Defense Brigade (2022–2025)
- Ukrainian: 125-та окрема бригада територіальної оборони
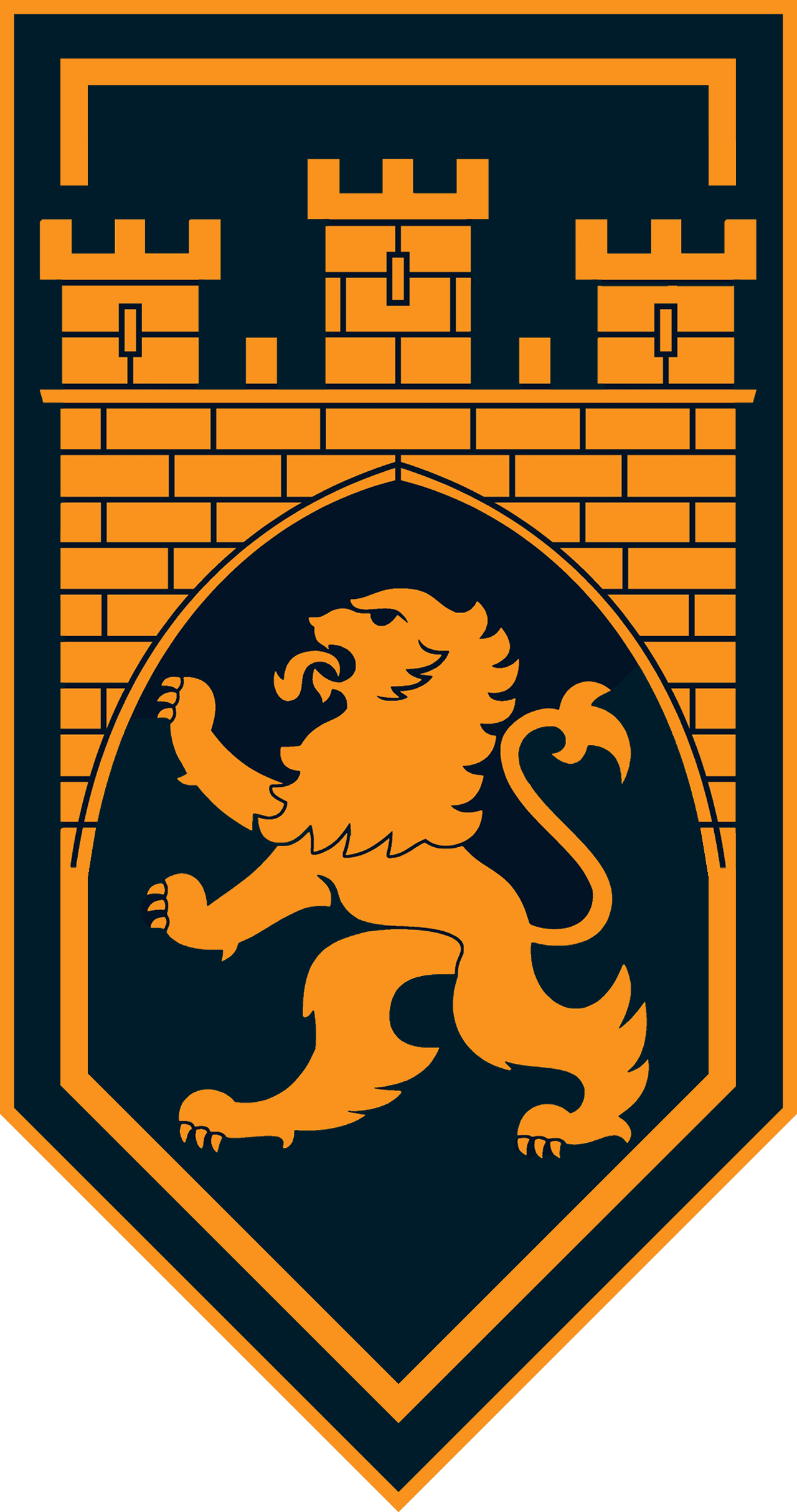
- Active: March 22, 2022 – present
- Country: Ukraine
- Branch: Armed Forces of Ukraine
- Role: Mechanized Infantry
- Size: 1,500–10,000
- Part of: Operational Command West; 3rd Army Corps
- Garrison/HQ: Lviv, Lviv Oblast
- Motto: Viribus Unitis
- Website: https://www.125tro.lviv.ua/

Commanders
- Current commander: Col. Vadim Bondarenko; Major Volodymyr Fokin

Insignia
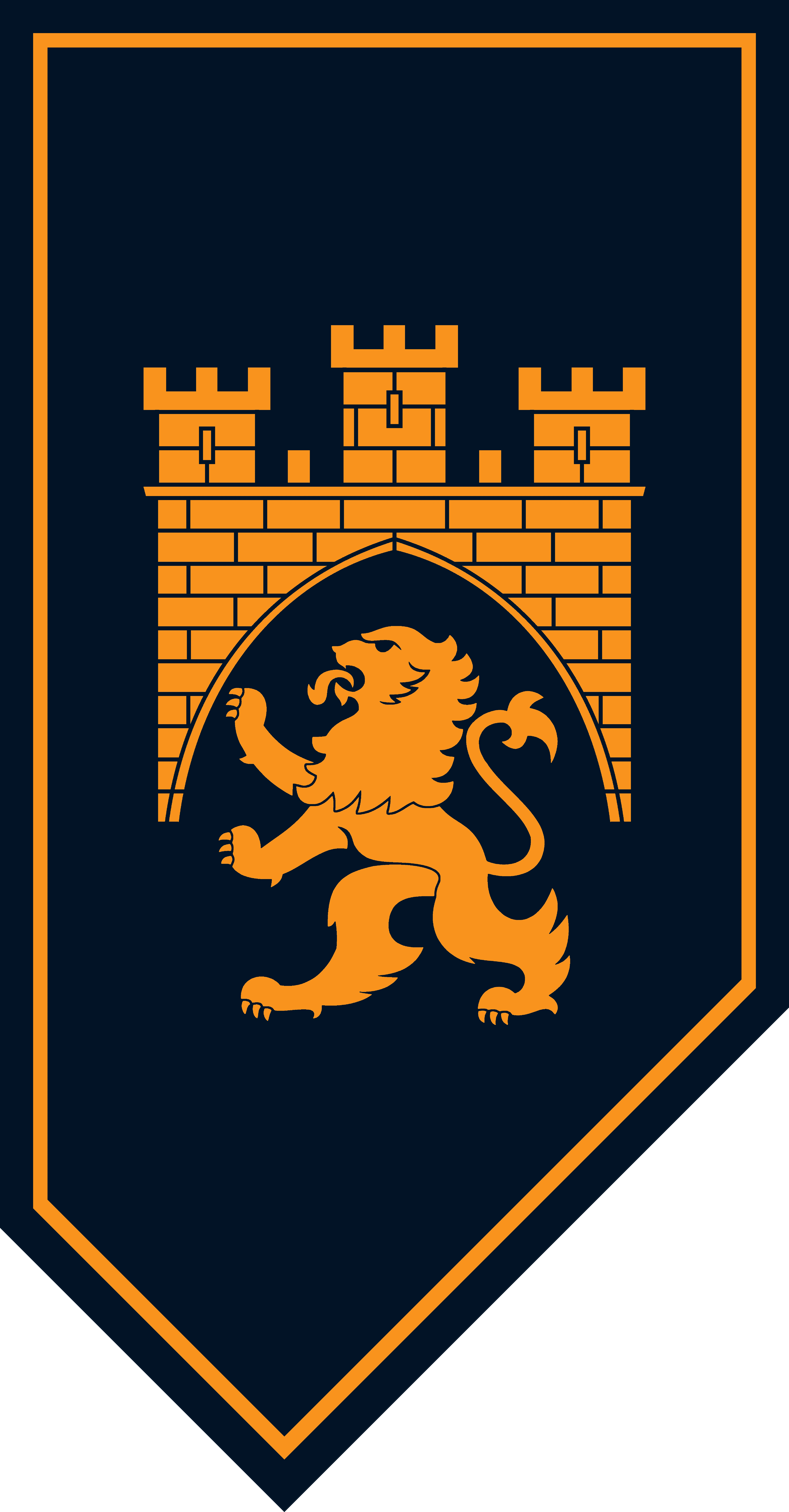
- Flag

- Logo (2025 – January 2026)

- Flag (until January 2026)

The 125th Heavy Mechanized Brigade (Ukrainian: 125-та окрема бригада територіальної оборони) is a military formation of the Ukrainian Ground Forces in Lviv. It is part of Operational Command West.

== History ==
=== Formation ===
On 27 February 2022 the brigade was formed in Lviv. In early March, the brigade was actively recruiting reservists and was in organizational process. Its purpose was protection of Lviv, its strategic facilities, protection of government facilities and counter-sabotage. The brigade was fully formed on 12 March. Lieutenant General Artur Horbenko was assigned to command it.

=== Russo-Ukrainian War ===
==== Russian invasion of Ukraine ====
As of 13 August, the brigade had lost 9 soldiers. Units of the brigade along with other formations of the Ukrainian Armed Forces liberated following villages and settlements in Donetsk Oblast: Ozerne, Dibrova, Yampil and Torske.

In November 2022, units of the brigade's 217th Battalion were taking part in combat in Donetsk Oblast.

On 4 December, the brigade received its battle flag. As of December 2022, units of the brigade were deployed to Kharkiv Oblast, Sumy Oblast and Donetsk Oblast.

Units of the 125th Brigade, including of its 218th Battalion, held positions in Bakhmut between January and March 2023.

In 2024, the brigade was transferred to the Ground Forces of Ukraine, and in July 2025, the unit was reformed as heavy mechanized brigade.

== Structure ==
From 2022 to 2025 the brigade's structure is as follows:

- Headquarters
- 215th Territorial Defense Battalion MUN А7390
- 216th Territorial Defense Battalion MUN А7391
- 217th Territorial Defense Battalion MUN А7392
- 218th Territorial Defense Battalion MUN А7393
- 219th Territorial Defense Battalion MUN А7394
- Counter-Sabotage Company
- Engineering Company
- Communication Company
- Logistics Company
- Mortar Battery

From 2025 the brigade's structure is as follows

- 1st Mechanized Battalion
- 2nd Mechanized Battalion
- Unmanned Systems Battalion "Primus"
- Self-Propelled Artillery Battalion
- Maintenance Battalion "Tur"
- Electronic Warfare Company
- Medical Company
- Support Center

From 2026 the brigade's structure is as follows

- 1st Mechanized Battalion
- 2nd Mechanized Battalion
- 1st Tank Battalion
- Unmanned Systems Battalion "Primus"
- Unmanned Ground Vehicles Company “Walle”
- Self-Propelled Artillery Battalion
- Maintenance Battalion “Tur”
- Electronic Warfare Company
- Medical Company
- Support Center

== Commanders ==
- Lt. Gen. Artur Horbenko 2022 – 2024

== See also ==
- Territorial Defence Forces of the Armed Forces of Ukraine
