= 39th Anti-aircraft Missile Regiment (Ukraine) =

- 39-й зенітний ракетний полк
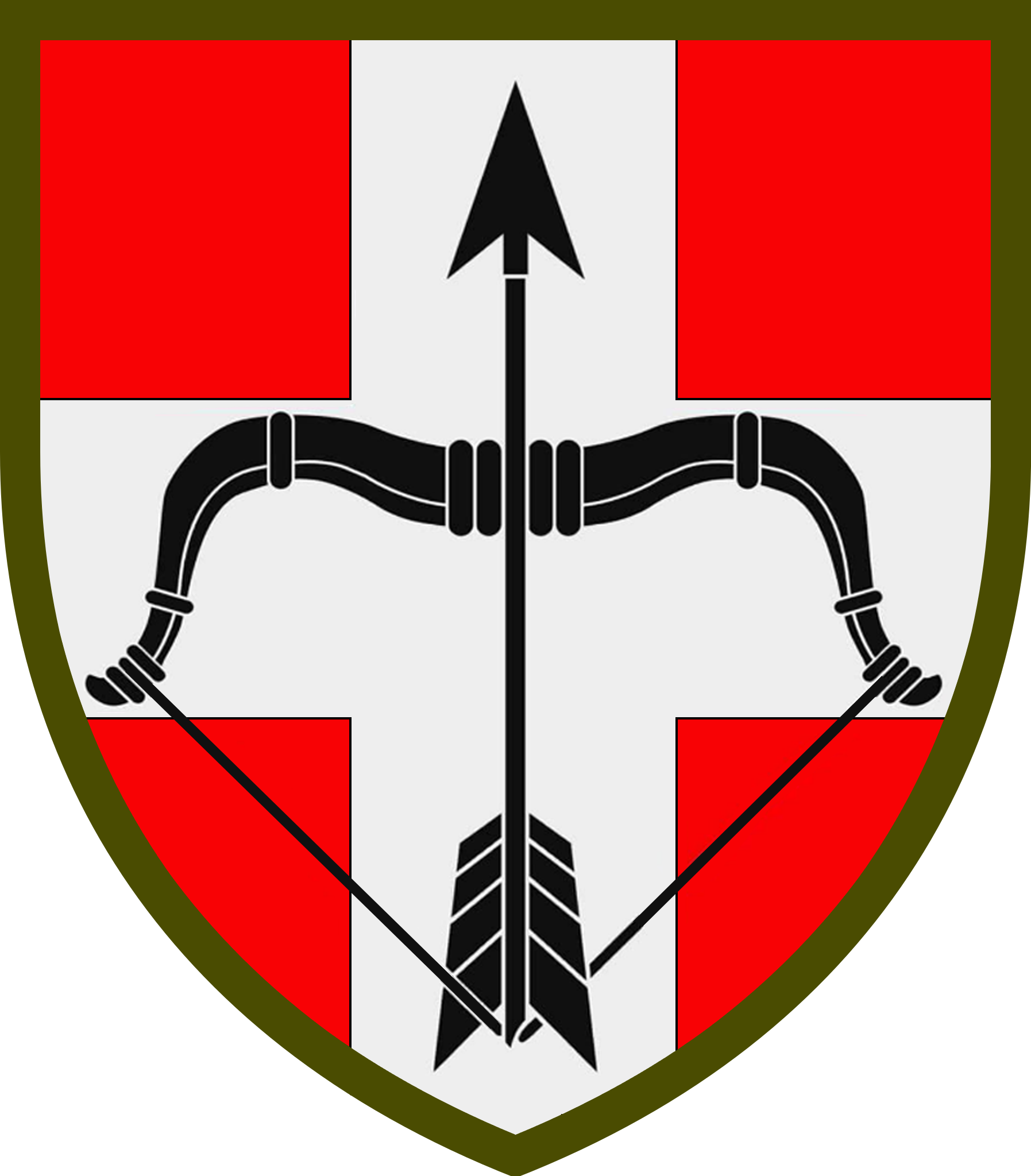
- Regiment insignia
- Founded: 2016
- Country: Ukraine
- Allegiance: Ministry of Defence
- Branch: Ukrainian Ground Forces
- Type: Ground based Air Defense Forces
- Role: Air Defense
- Garrison/HQ: Volodymyr City
- Engagements: Russo-Ukrainian War; War in Donbass; Russian invasion of Ukraine; Northern Ukraine campaign; Battle of Izium; Eastern Ukraine campaign; Battle of Shchastia; Battle of Sievierodonetsk (2022); Battle of Kreminna; Battle of Rubizhne; Battle of Popasna; Siversk

Commanders
- Current commander: Colonel Zaichenko Kostyantyn Viktorovych

Insignia
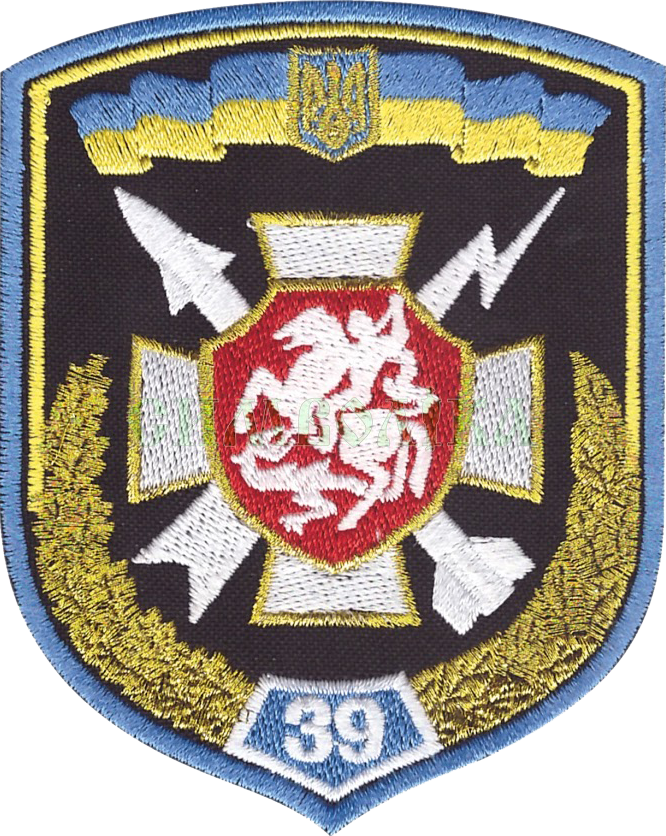
- Former Insignia

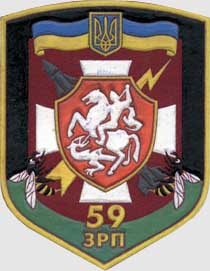
- Former Insignia

The 39th Anti-Aircraft Missile Regiment (MUN A2892) is a regiment level military unit of the Ukrainian Ground Forces, operationally under the command of Operational Command West. The Regiment is based in Volodymyr City. It was reestablished in 2016 and has seen combat during both the War in Donbass and the Russian invasion of Ukraine.

== History ==
In 1992, the 59th Anti-aircraft Missile Regiment was transferred to Ukraine and was disbanded in 2012 before being reformed in June 2016 as the 39th Anti-Aircraft Missile Regiment. In September 2016, Volodymyr City authorities started preparing its barracks as it was scheduled to be stationed by December 2016. On 27 December 2016, it was fully established and started performing operations in the ATO zone till May 2017. On 26 April 2018, it returned to headquarters after completing yet another a six-month rotation.

Following the Russian invasion of Ukraine, it saw heavy combat. On 24 February 2022, an anti-aircraft missile unit of the Regiment was protecting the Kyiv Hydroelectric Power Plant from Russian air raids and missile strikes, when a Russian cruise missiles hit the anti-aircraft gunners' positions, killing a soldier Nikonchuk Andriy Valeriyovych, who was posthumously awarded the Hero of Ukraine. On the same day, another anti-aircraft missile system of the regiment, led by Lieutenant Vitaly Movchan, was on combat duty covering local civilians and troops in Luhansk Oblast being among the first air defense system crews to take on combat positions. A Russian aircraft approached the air defense position but was detected and hit by an anti-aircraft missile, the aircraft being later identified as a Russian Su-30, after which it was also able to destroy a Russian UAV but in the evening, a pair of Russian Mi-24 attack helicopters approached and struck the air defense system in Tryokhizbenka, Lt. Movchan Vitaliy Anatoliyovych was killed and all other crew members were severely wounded, he was also posthumously awarded the Hero of Ukraine. A soldier of the brigade, Badzyun Valeriy Vasyliovych was killed on 11 March 2022 in a battle with Russian forces in Donetsk Oblast. On 2 January 2023, it received gratitude from the President of Ukraine. In December 2024, the regiment bought 100+ Besomar-3210 UAVs. On 13 March 2025, its forces inflicted heavy casualties on Russian forces. In total, the regiment has destroyed at least four Russian Su-30 aircraft, three helicopters, two cruise missiles and over 230 UAVs as well as utilizing electronic warfare units to cover ground forces in the Battles of Shchastia, Severodonetsk, Kreminna, Rubizhne, Popasna, Izyum and Siversk.

== Commanders ==
- Colonel Zaichenko Kostyantyn Viktorovych

== Sources ==
- Структура Сухопутних військ України
