= Yuriy Dumansky =

Ukrainian army officer (born 1965)

- Юрій Анатолійович Думанський
- Born: Yuriy Anatoliyovych Dumansky; 12 February 1965 (age 61); Nelipivtsi, Ukraine, Soviet Union
- Military career
- Allegiance: Ukraine
- Branch: Ukrainian Ground Forces
- Rank: Lieutenant general

Yuriy Anatoliyovych Dumansky (Ukrainian: Юрій Анатолійович Думанський; born 12 February 1965), is a Ukrainian army officer who last served as the deputy chief of the General Staff of the Armed Forces of Ukraine from 2012 to 2014.

He also served as the commander of the Operational Command West from 2010 to 2012.

== Biography ==
Yuriy Dumansky was born on 12 February 1965 in Nelypivtsi, Kelmenetska district, Chernivtsi Oblast.

In 1986, he graduated from the Tashkent Higher Military Command School, and in the same year, he began his service the same year as a platoon commander of training combat weapons and equipment in the Carpathian Military District.

In 1993, he promoted as the chief of staff and deputy commander of the training motorized rifle battalion of the motorized rifle regiment.

From 1995 to 1996, he became the commander of the training motorized rifle battalion, the chief of staff, the deputy commander of the training tank regiment.

In 1998, he graduated from the Academy of the Armed Forces of Ukraine and qualified as an operational-tactical military command officer. After completing his studies at the academy, he was appointed as the commander of the training tank regiment of the district training center for training junior specialists of the Northern Operational Territorial Command.

From 1999 to 2004, he held the position of a deputy head of the training center of the Ground Forces of the Armed Forces of Ukraine.

In 2005, he graduated from the National Defense Academy of Ukraine, received an operational-strategic level of military education and obtained a master's degree in state military administration. After completing his studies at the academy, Dumansky was appointed as the first deputy chief of staff of the Operational Command South the same year.

From 2005 to 2010, he demoted as the deputy commander of the 6th Army Corps.

In 2010, he became the deputy commander of the Ground Forces of the Armed Forces of Ukraine for combat training — head of the combat training department of the Command of the Ground Forces of the Armed Forces of Ukraine. On 26 April, Dumansky was appointed as the commander of the Operational Command North.

On 10 May 2012, by order of the minister of defense of Ukraine No. 358, he was appointed to the post of deputy chief of the General Staff of the Armed Forces of Ukraine.

In 2014, he graduated from the Lviv Regional Institute of Public Administration of the National Academy of Public Administration under the president of Ukraine and obtained a master's degree in public administration.

On 21 February, he resigned from office from a written document.

== Family ==
He is married and has two daughters.
