= Vesela Hora =

Vesela Hora (Ukrainian: Весела Гора) may refer to the following places in Ukraine:

- Vesela Hora, Donetsk Oblast
- Vesela Hora, Luhansk Oblast
