= Luhanske, Crimea =

Luhanske
- Village
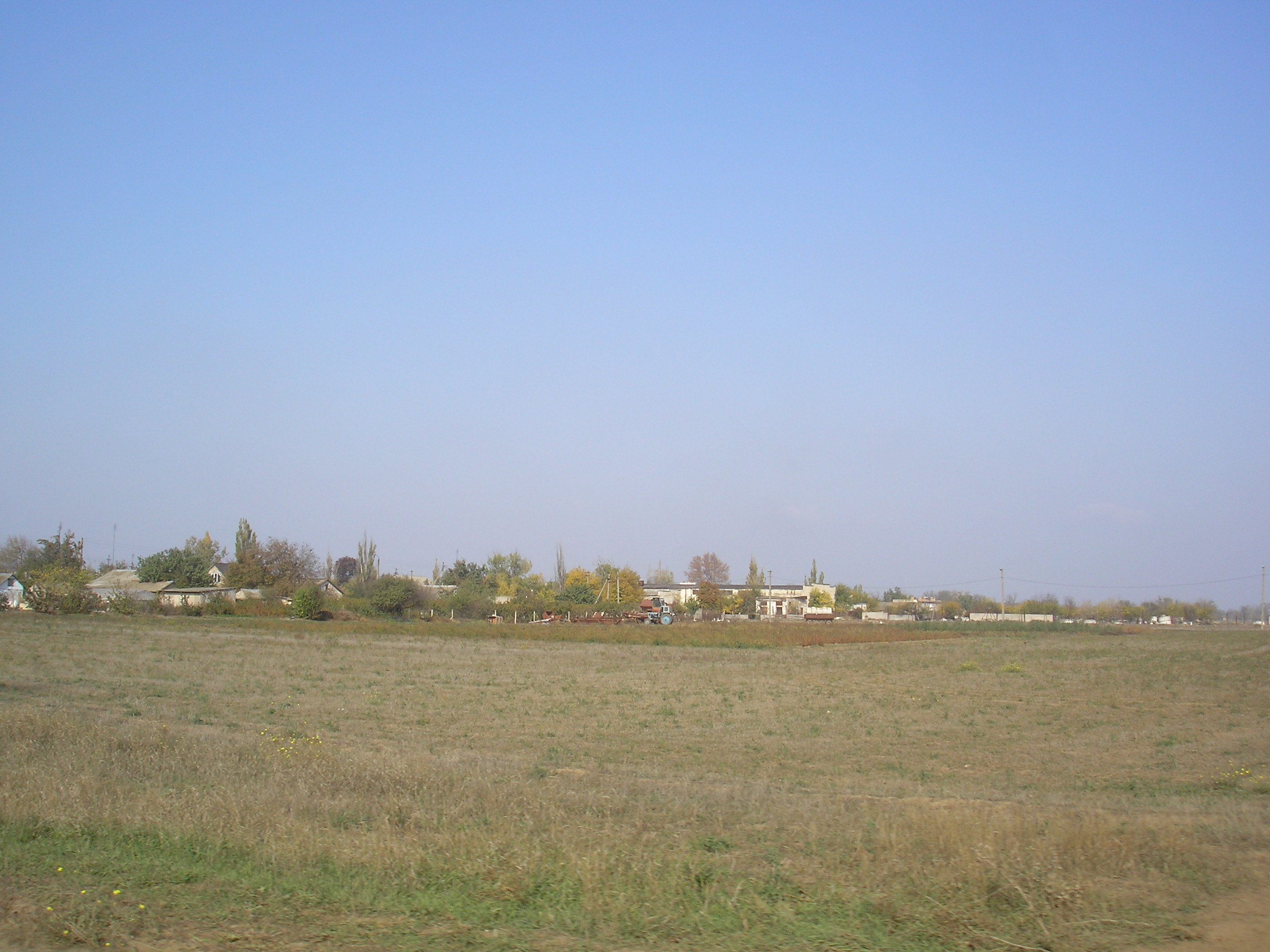

- Location within Ukraine Location within Crimea
- Coordinates: 45°48′05″N 34°14′15″E
- Country: Ukraine (Occupied by Russia
- Region: (Autonomous Republic of Crimea) Crimea
- Municipality: Dzhankoi Raion
- Elevation: 25 m (82 ft)

Population (2014)
  - Total: 1,129
- Time zone: UTC+4 (MSK)
- ^{1} Autonomous Republic of Crimea (de jure) or Republic of Crimea (de facto), depending on jurisdiction.

Luhanske (Russian: Луганское; Ukrainian: Луганське; Crimean Tatar: Luganskoye) is a village in Dzhankoi Raion, Crimea. Population: 1,129 (2014 Census).

== Demographics ==
According to the 2001 census, 1450 people lived in the village. The linguistic composition of the village population was as follows:

Language	Percentage
Russian	56.76 %
Ukrainian	21.59 %
Crimean Tatar	18.07 %
Others	0.69 %
