= Balka, Donetsk Oblast =

Balka Балка
- Village
- Location of Balka Balka (Ukraine)
- Coordinates: 47°58′14″N 38°44′01″E
- Country: Ukraine
- Oblast (Province): Donetsk
- Raion (District): Horlivka Raion
- Hromada: Snizhne urban hromada
- Time zone: UTC+2
  - Summer (DST): UTC+3

Balka (Ukrainian: Балка) is a small rural settlement in the Snizhne urban hromada, Horlivka Raion, Donetsk Oblast. The population is 47 people.

Until 2016 the settlement was called Chervonyi Zhovten.
