= Zemlianky, Donetsk Oblast =

Urban locality in Donetsk Oblast, Ukraine

Zemlianky Землянки
- Rural settlement
- Location of Zemlianky within Donetsk Oblast#Location of Zemlianky within Ukraine Zemlianky (Ukraine)
- Coordinates: 48°07′55″N 37°54′46″E
- Country: Ukraine
- Oblast: Donetsk Oblast
- Raion: Donetsk Raion
- Hromada: Makiivka urban hromada
- Elevation: 201 m (659 ft)

Population (2022)
  - Total: 1,691
- Time zone: UTC+2 (EET)
  - Summer (DST): UTC+3 (EEST)
- Postal code: 86182
- Area code: +380 6232

Zemlianky (Ukrainian: Землянки) is a rural settlement in Makiivka urban hromada, Donetsk Raion in Donetsk Oblast of Ukraine. Population: 1,691 (2022 estimate).

== Demographics ==
Native language as of the Ukrainian Census of 2001:

- Ukrainian 60.08%
- Russian 39.69%
- Belarusian, Bulgarian, Moldovan (Romanian) 0.05%
