= Ivashkivtsi =

Ivashkivtsi (Ukrainian: Івашківці) may refer to the following places in Ukraine:

- Ivashkivtsi, Kamianets-Podilskyi Raion, Khmelnytskyi Oblast, village in Kamianets-Podilskyi Raion, Khmelnytskyi Oblast
- Ivashkivtsi, Khmelnytskyi Raion, Khmelnytskyi Oblast, village in Khmelnytskyi Raion, Khmelnytskyi Oblast
- Ivashkivtsi, Lviv Oblast, village in Sambir Raion, Lviv Oblast
- Ivashkivtsi, Ternopil Oblast, village in Ternopil Raion, Ternopil Oblast
- Ivashkivtsi, Vinnytsia Oblast, village in Zhmerynka Raion, Vinnytsia Oblast
