= Ukrainian Ground Forces =

Land forces of Ukraine

- Сухопутні війська Збройних сил України
- Emblem of the Ukrainian Ground Forces, containing the tryzub and cossack cross
- Active: 1917–1922; 1991–present
- Country: Ukraine
- Type: Army
- Role: Ground warfare
- Size: 450,000 (2026)
- Part of: Armed Forces of Ukraine
- Headquarters: Kyiv, Ukraine
- Anniversaries: Army Day (6 December)
- Engagements: Bosnian War; Siege of Žepa; Kosovo War; 1999 East Timorese crisis; Iraq War; War in Afghanistan; Russo–Ukrainian War
- Website: war.ukraine.ua

Commanders
- Commander: Brigadier General Svyatoslav Zaits

Insignia
- Ensign

- Cap badge

- Shoulder sleeve insignia

The Ukrainian Ground Forces (SVZSU, Ukrainian: Сухопутні війська Збройних сил України, СВЗСУ, romanized: Sukhoputni viiska Zbroinykh syl Ukrainy), also referred to as the Ukrainian Army is the land force, and one of the eight branches of the Armed Forces of Ukraine. It was formed from Ukrainian units of the Soviet Army after Ukrainian independence, and its ancestry is traced back to the 1917–22 army of the Ukrainian People's Republic.

After the dissolution of the Soviet Union in 1991, Ukraine retained its Soviet-era army equipment. The Armed Forces were systematically downsized and underinvested in after 1991. As a result, the Ukrainian army had very little of its Soviet equipment in working order by July 2014, and most systems had become antiquated. Personnel numbers had shrunk and training, command, and support functions needed improvement. After the start of the war in Donbas in April 2014 in eastern Ukraine, Ukraine embarked on a program to enlarge and modernise its armed forces. Personnel in the Ukrainian Armed Forces overall climbed from 129,950 in March 2014 to 204,000 active personnel in May 2015, with 169,000 soldiers in the Ground Forces branch as of 2016. In 2016, 75% of the army consisted of contract servicemen. Since 2014, Ukraine's ground forces have also been equipped with increasingly modern tanks, APCs, and many other types of combat equipment.

== History ==
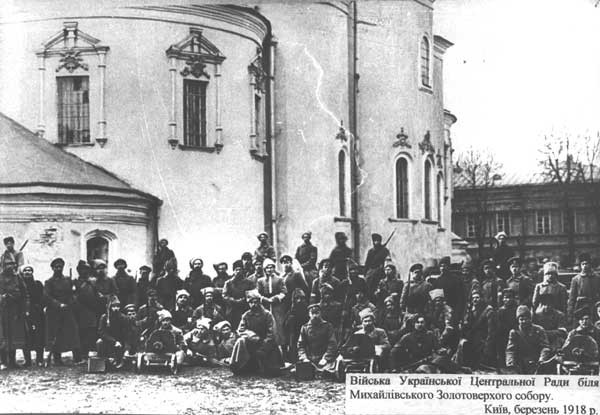
Ukrainian People's Army soldiers in front of St. Michael's Golden-Domed Monastery in Kyiv, 1918

The Ukrainian Ground Forces traces its ancestry to the Ukrainian People's Army and the Ukrainian Galician Army of 1917–21. It fought in the Ukrainian War of Independence (the Ukrainian-Soviet War), the Southern Front of the Russian Civil War, the Polish–Ukrainian War, and the Polish–Soviet War.

Since 2015, with the adoption of the Defenders Day holiday, certain traditions of the Ukrainian Insurgent Army of World War II have been incorporated into the ethos and culture of the Ground Forces.

=== Collapse of the USSR ===
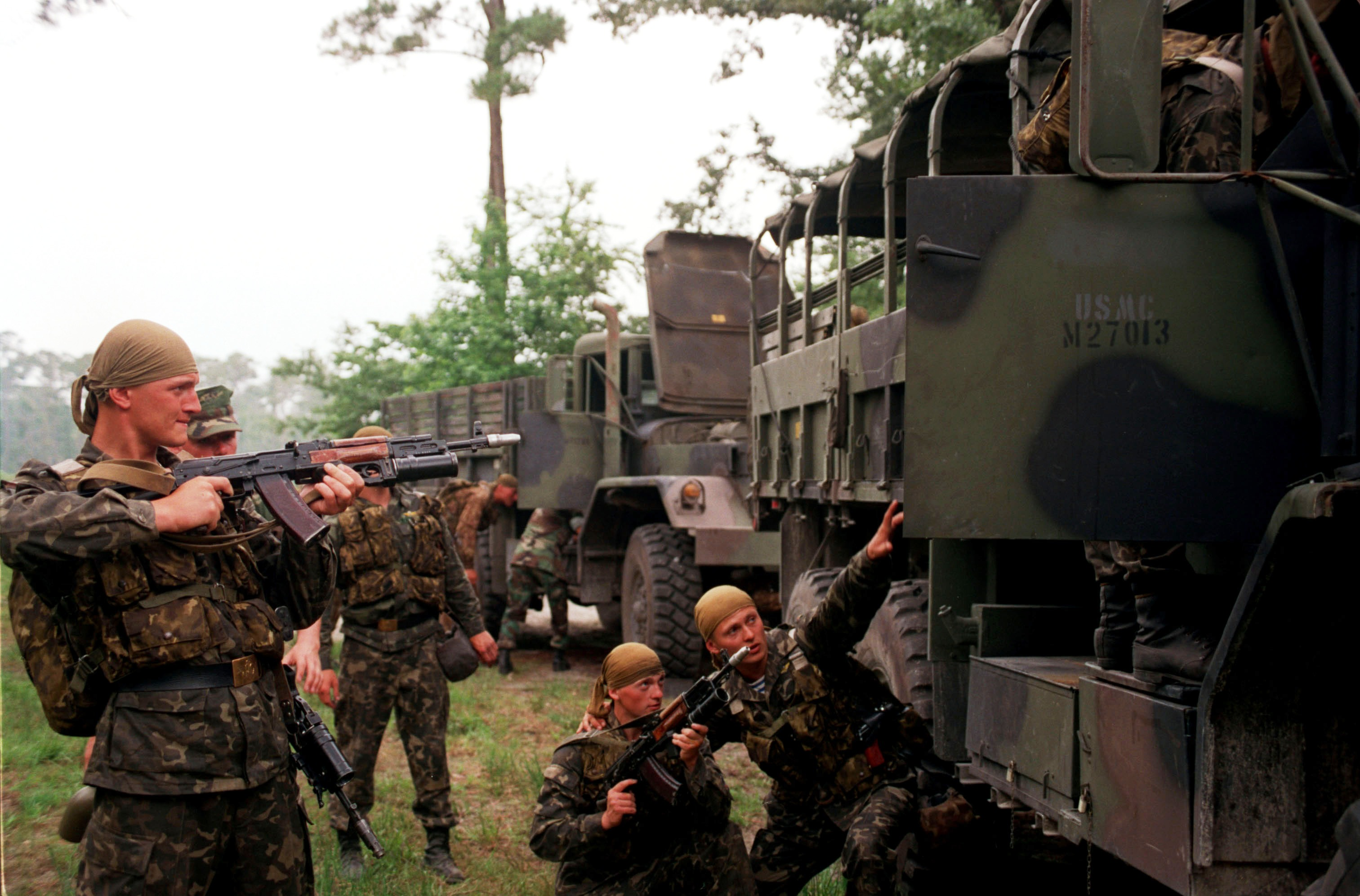
Ukrainian soldiers on a military exercise in 1998

The August 1991 Soviet coup attempt began the process of splitting the Soviet military. Leonid Kravchuk, the head of the Ukrainian Supreme Soviet, declared on 24 August 1991 the formation of the Ukrainian Armed Forces, the subordination of Soviet military units in Ukraine, and the creation of the Ministry of Defence of Ukraine. On 3 September 1991 the Soviet Air Force major general Kostyantyn Morozov was appointed the first Minister of Defense of Ukraine by the Verkhovna Rada, the new parliament. In October the Council of Ministers declared that a Ukrainian army would be created with 450,000 troops and the Ukrainian parliament adopted several laws that created the framework for the creation of Ukrainian ground, naval, and air forces, as well as a national guard. The Soviet defense ministry was opposed to this initially, but by early November they started talks with the Ukrainian defense ministry to manage the division of Soviet forces in Ukraine.

The Ground Forces were officially established on 6 December 1991 as part of the armed forces, with a presidential decree on 12 December - from then on marked as Ground Forces Day - being the first that designated the Soviet Army's Ukrainian formations as the ground component of the new force.

After their establishment, in 1992 the Ukrainian Ground Forces included approximately 245,000 personnel and 6,500 tanks.

=== Creation of the Ground Forces ===
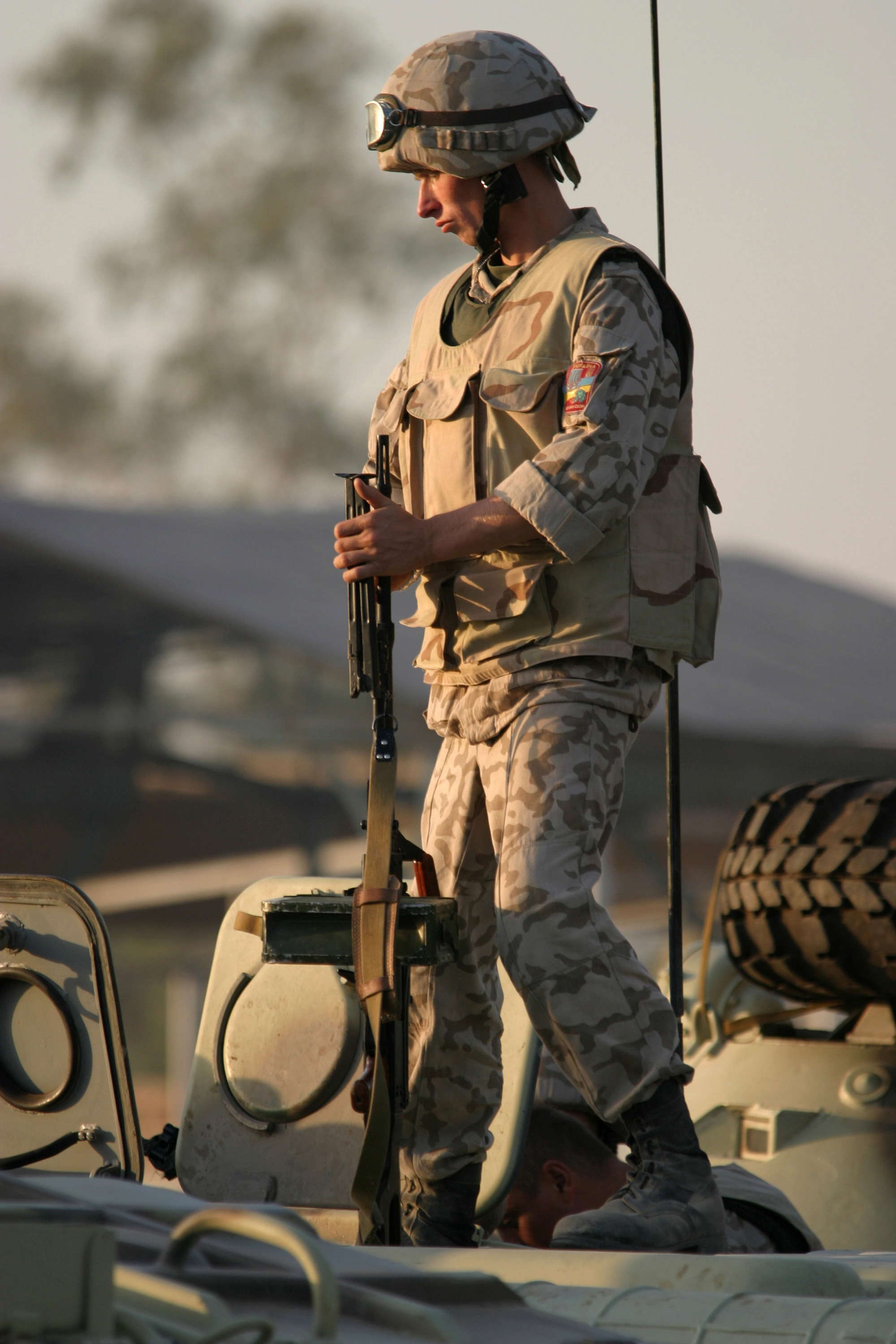
Ukrainian army Soldier in Iraq, 2003

The Ukrainian Ground Forces were the second largest army in Europe at the time. Following the declaration of Ukrainian independence in 1991, among those formations gained by the new Ukrainian Ground Forces by inheritance from the old Soviet Army were the 1st Guards Army, the 13th Army, the 38th Army, two tank armies (the 6th Guards Tank Army and the 8th Tank Army), and the 32nd Army Corps at Simferopol. The 28th Guards Motor Rifle Division and the 180th Rifle Division were left in Ukraine, having been previously under the 14th Guards Army headquartered at Tiraspol in the Moldovan SSR. The post of commander of ground troops was designated in early 1992. By the end of 1992, the Kyiv Military District was disbanded, and Ukraine used its structures as the basis for the Ministry of Defence and the General Staff.

The government made an effort to get all troops to take an oath of allegiance to Ukraine to prevent a possible coup. All personnel were required to either take the oath, or to retire or return to their home republic. The Ukrainian oath of loyalty that was administered was not based on ethnicity or linguistics but on a civic identity, and turned the Soviet Army in Ukraine into the modern Ukrainian Ground Forces. As of February 1992, about 80% of personnel had taken the oath, according to Defense Minister Morozov. Laws establishing regulations the personnel and technical basis for the military were passed in 1992, which included keeping the Soviet rank structure, with the exception of the rank of marshal, which was replaced with general of the army of Ukraine. It was planned that the restructuring of the entire Armed Forces would take place until 1995.

Between June and August 1993, the first redesignation of armies to army corps appears to have taken place. While the post of Chief of Ground Forces had been created in early 1992, it was over two years before the first holder, Colonel General Vasyl Sobkov, was appointed on 7 April 1994.

The creation of the Ground Forces as a separate branch of the young AFU was formalised by Presidential Decree 368/96 of 23 May 1996, 'On the Ground Forces of Ukraine.' That year both the Ground Forces Command was formed and the 1st Army Corps was reorganised as the Northern Territorial Operational Command (which became the Northern Operational Command in 1998). In 1997 the Carpathian Military District was reorganised as Operational Command West.

From 1992 to 1997, the forces of the Kyiv MD were transferred to the Odesa MD, and the Odesa MD's headquarters moved to Donetsk.

In a December 1996 speech, President Leonid Kuchma revealed that as many as 191 mechanised infantry and tank battalions were rated not ready, adding,"This is especially dangerous in the forward-based units securing the nation's borders."

=== Reform ===
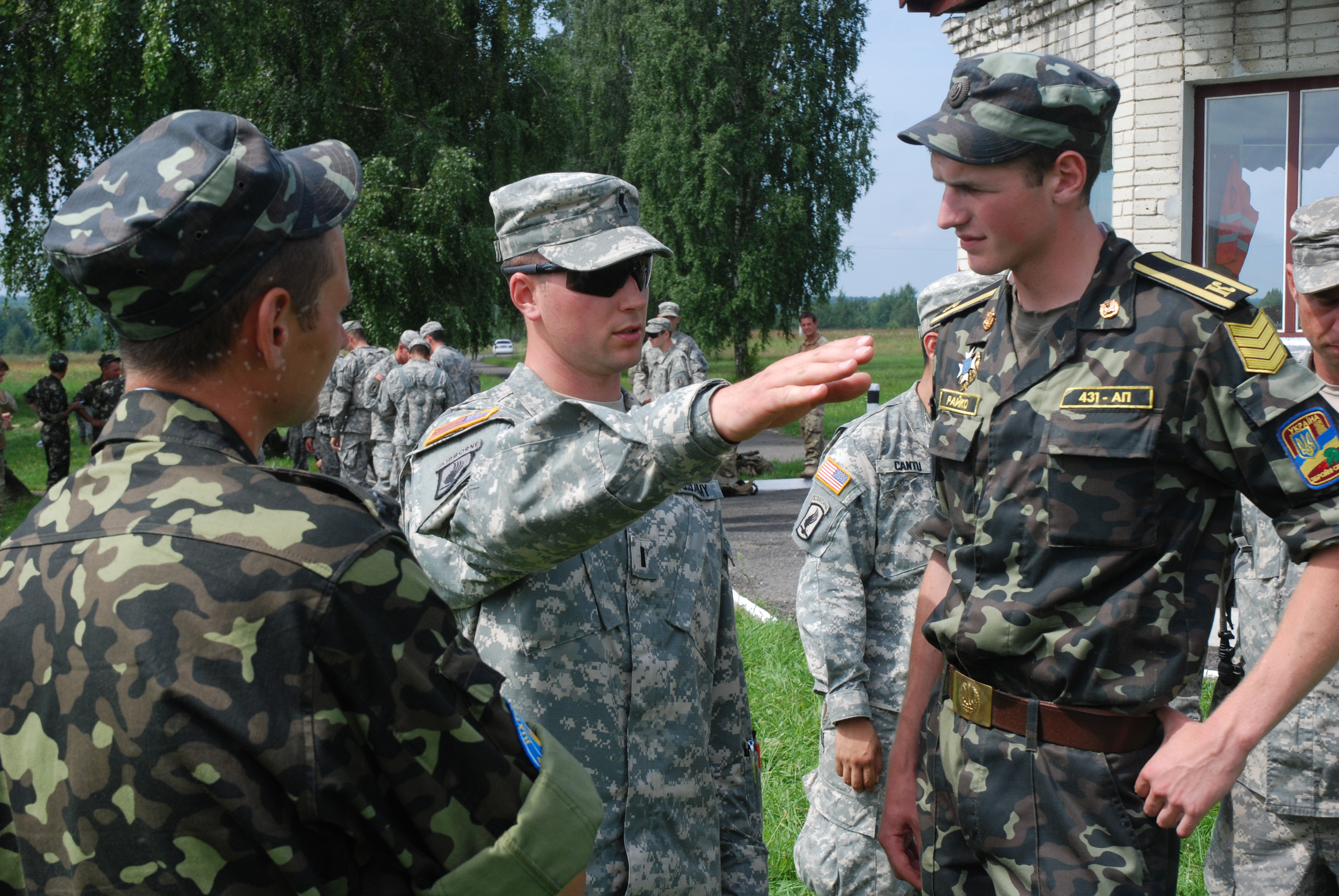
Ukrainian and US Army soldiers during the 2011 Rapid Trident exercise

Under a plan promulgated in 2000, the Ground Forces were to reduce the number of troops from 300,000 to 240,000 by 2015, and an ultimate change from a partial conscript-based force to a fully professional military. The armed forces received little more than half of the Hr 68 million it was promised for reform in 2001, but managed to disband nine regiments and close 21 local military bases. (Note: According to the State Program of the Ukrainian Armed Forces reform and development to 2005, the ground forces were to have the biggest ratio of personnel of all services (up to 54%). This ratio was to be based on the missions assigned to the armed forces, and also on the fact that the economy of Ukraine could not support any larger troop numbers. However, the ground forces still has priority in the number of personnel, weapons, military equipment development priorities and the development of their future systems, which were to correspond to modern warfare requirements. The ground forces were planned to closely coordinate their assignments with other army branches, engaging appropriate military arts and equipment. They were to also be involved in law enforcement activities during emergencies, dealing with consequences of technological and natural disasters, providing military assistance to other countries, engaging in international military cooperation activities (UN), and participating in international peacekeeping operations according to international agreements.)

In 2005–06, the Northern Operational Command was reorganised as Territorial Directorate "North". It was tasked with territorial defence, mobilisation training, and preparation of reserves. (Note: It was reported on 27 July 2005 that '..[o]ver 70 per cent of planned work on [the] disbandment of the Ukrainian armed forces' Northern Operational Command has been completed,' according to the Defence Ministry's press service.)

From 1991, the Ukrainian Ground Forces bought its military equipment only from Russia and other CIS states, as well as locally producing some of their own equipment. Until 2014 and the start of the war in Donbas, the defence industry in Ukraine produced equipment mostly for export.

=== Russian occupation of Crimea ===
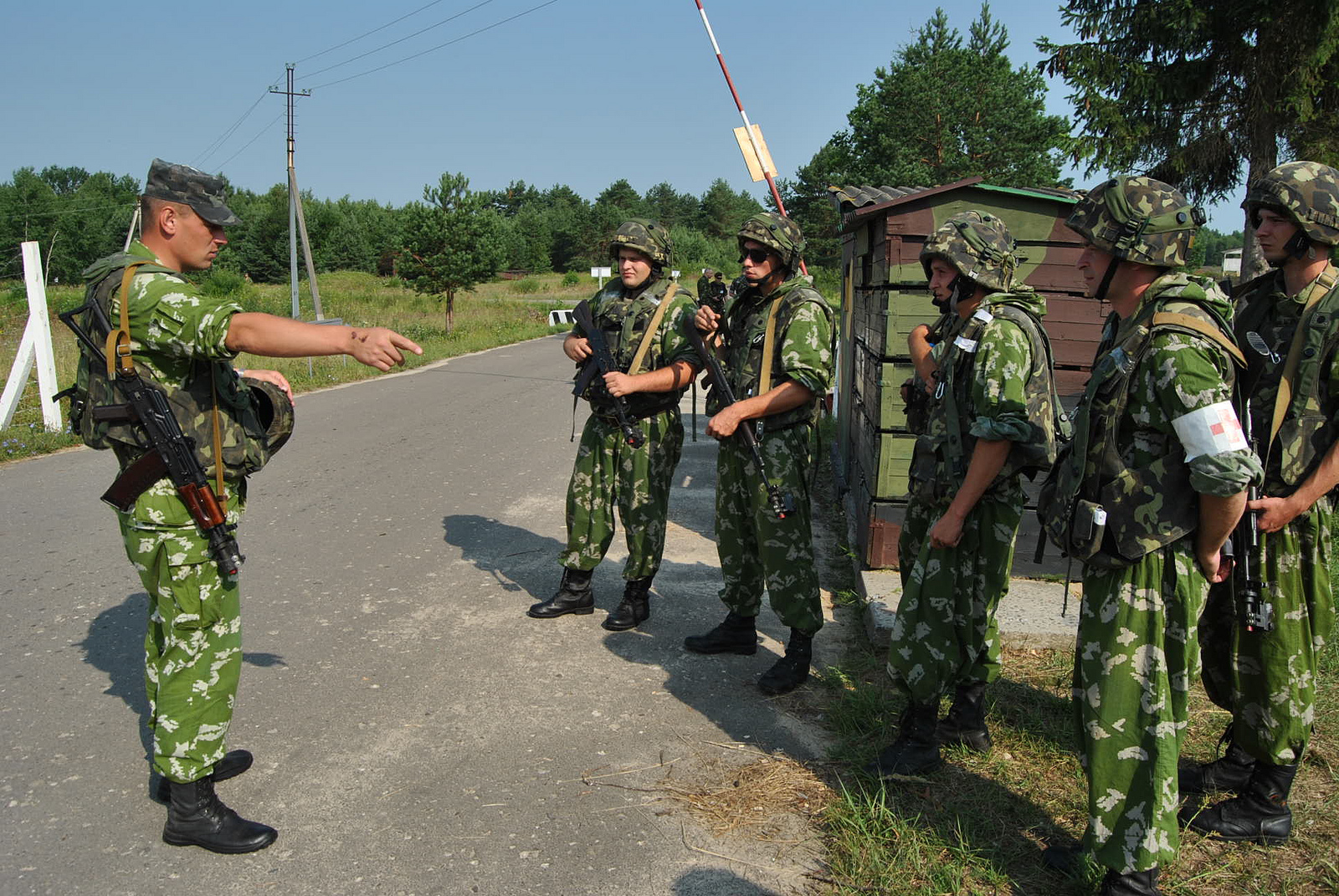
Ukrainian troops in 2013, a year before the annexation of Crimea

In the aftermath of the 2014 Ukrainian Revolution, Russian special forces in unmarked uniforms began surrounding Ukrainian military bases on the Crimean peninsula before capturing them individually using a mixture of attrition and threats. Over the following weeks the Russian Armed Forces consolidated control of the peninsula and established road blocks to cut off the possibility of Ukraine sending reinforcements from the mainland. The takeover of Crimea was largely bloodless, as the Ukrainian soldiers there did not fight back. By the end of March, all remaining Ukrainian troops were ordered to pull out of Crimea.

The Ukrainian army was considered to be in a poor state during and after the annexation, with only 6,000 of its troops ready for combat and many of its vehicles lacking batteries. After Russia's annexation only 6,000 of the 20,300 Ukrainian soldiers stationed in Crimea before the annexation left the peninsula. The rest stayed in Crimea and defected to Russia.

=== Russo-Ukrainian War ===
==== War in Donbas (2014–2022) ====
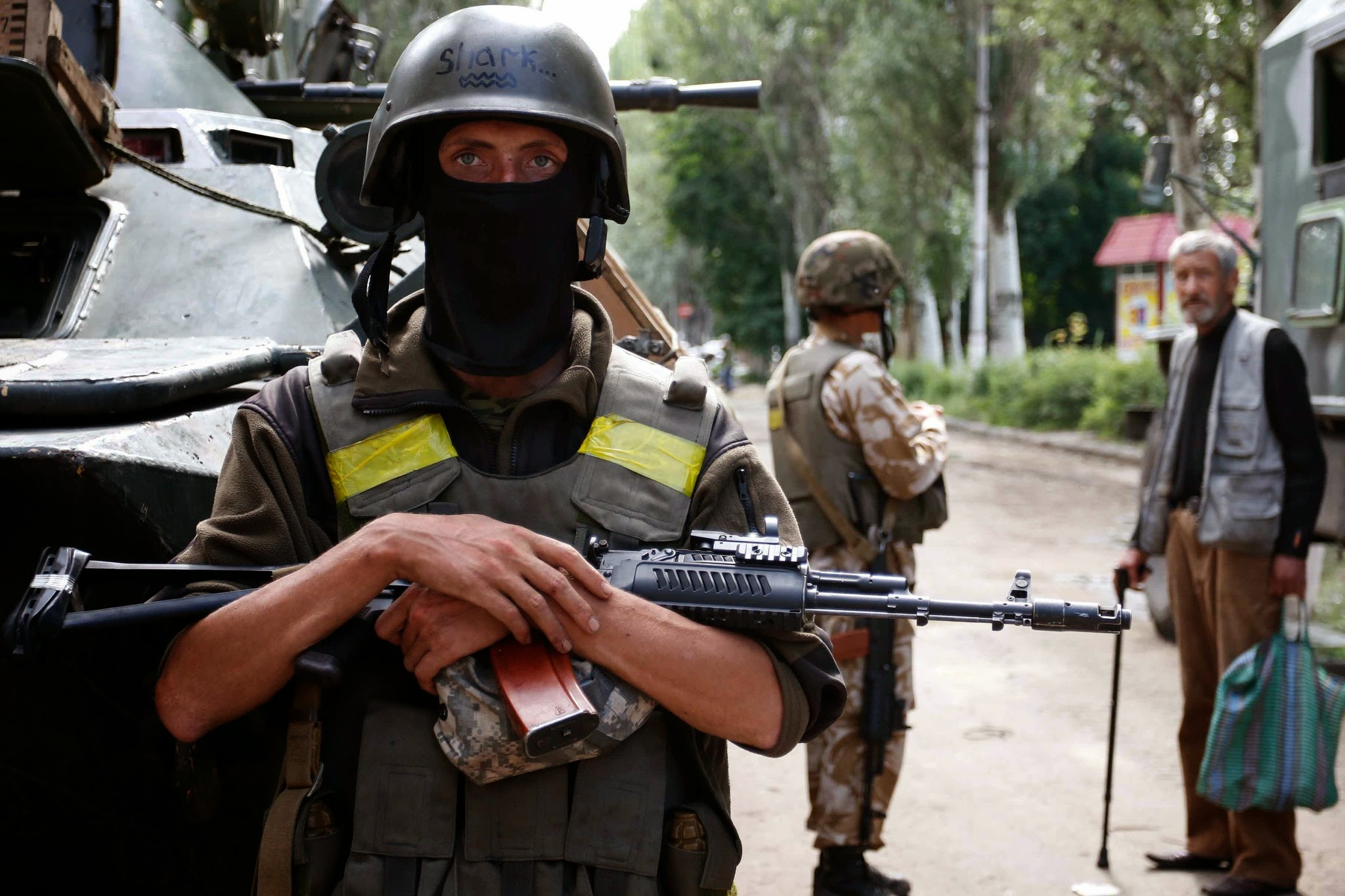
Ukrainian soldier in the aftermath of the Siege of Sloviansk on 9 July 2014.

In the early months of the war in Donbas that erupted in 2014 the Armed Forces were widely criticised for their poor equipment and inept leadership, forcing Internal Affairs Ministry forces like the National Guard and the territorial defence battalions to take on the brunt of the fighting in the first months of the war.

By February 2018 the Ukrainian Armed Forces were larger and better equipped, numbering 200,000 active-service military personnel. Most of the volunteer soldiers of the territorial defence battalions were integrated into the Ukrainian army.

Within the reporting period of 16 November 2017 to 15 February 2018 a United Nations OHCHR monitoring mission documented 115 cases of credible allegations of human rights abuses committed by Russia and its proxy forces. The nature of the crimes ranges from enforced disappearances, looting of civilian property, torture, rape and sexual violence up to political repression and extrajudicial killings.

==== Full-scale Russian invasion (2022–present) ====
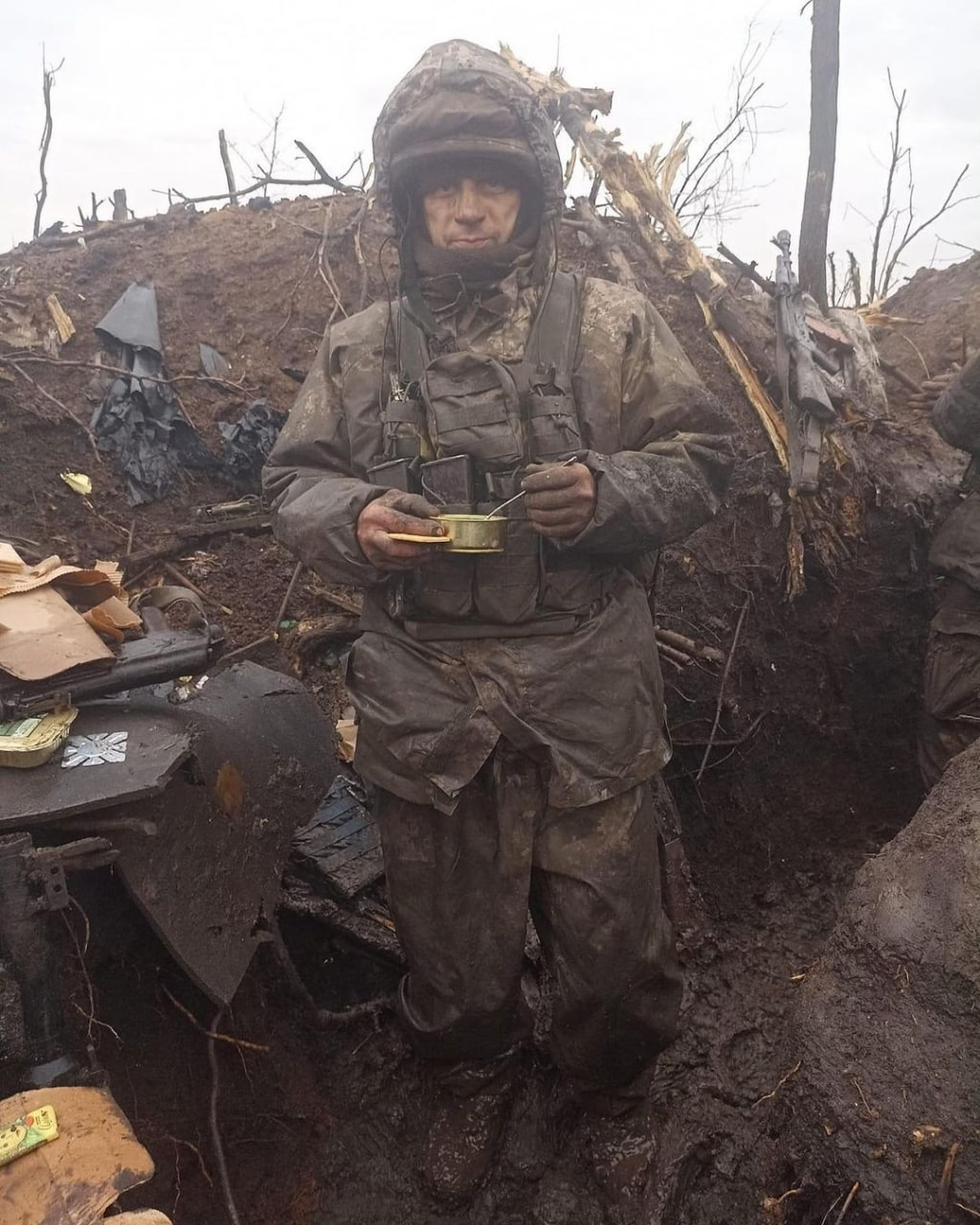
Ukrainian soldier in a trench during the Russian invasion of Ukraine in 2022

On 24 February 2022, Russia began a full-scale invasion of Ukraine. The Ground Forces have been participants in most of the land combat actions of the ongoing war. The influx of Western material and supplies to the branch before and during the conflict as well as mobilisation efforts have resulted in a massive expansion of the force, in addition to ongoing force modernisation.

== Military training and education centres ==
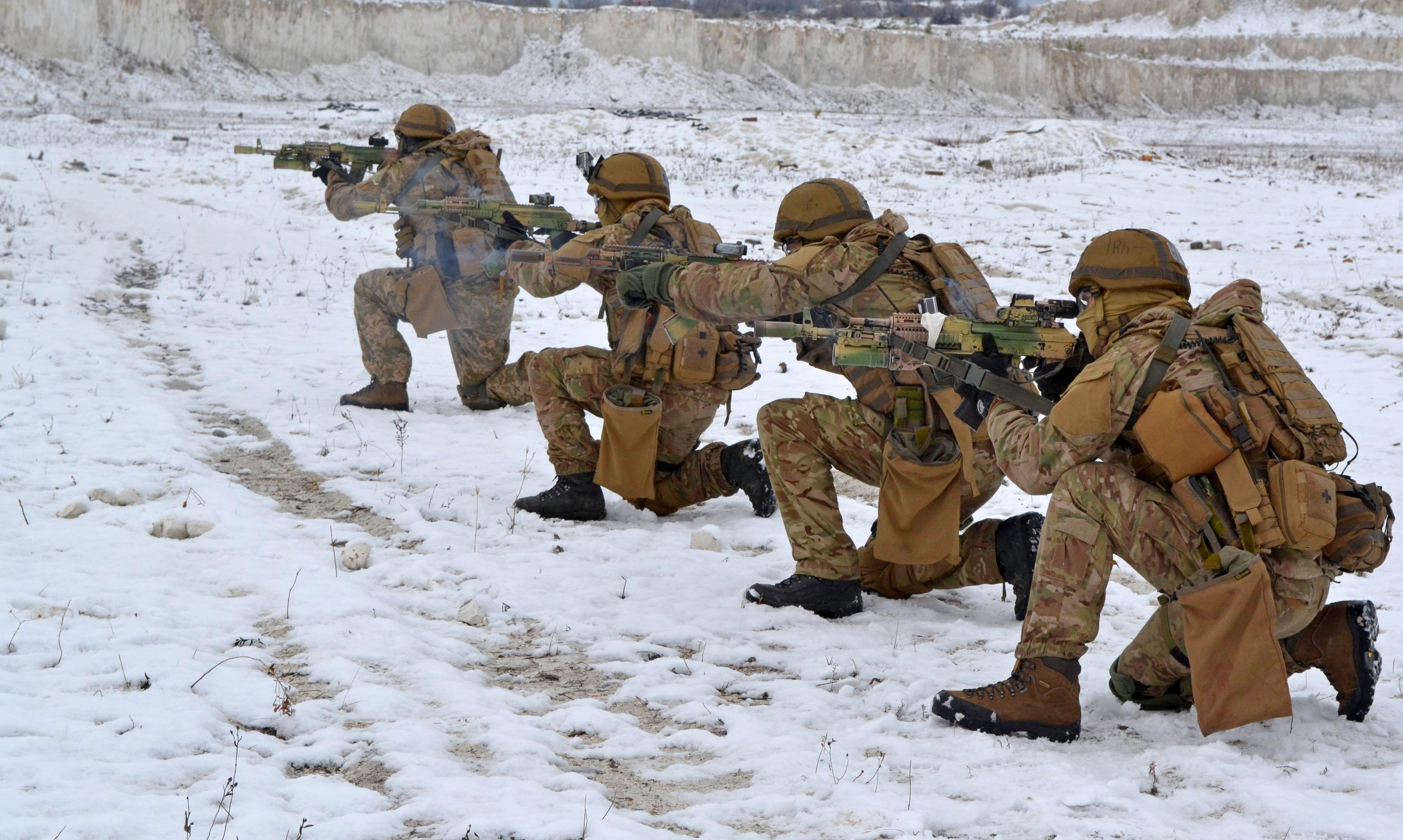
Ukrainian special forces soldiers during an exercise in November 2015

Ukrainian soldier and Canadian soldier conversing with each other during the 2014 Rapid Trident exercise in Yavoriv, Ukraine

Training in 2006 was aimed at developing mobility and combat readiness of the forces. The Ukrainian Armed Forces took advantage of the opportunities provided by UN exercises and exercises where Ukraine, NATO members, and other partners participated.

Training resulted in 6,000 combat-ready troops in the spring of 2014 of Ukraine's (then) 129,950 active military personnel. In 2016 the Ukrainian army had more than 200,000 combat-ready soldiers of its 260,000 active personnel.

In 2015 Ukraine, the United States, the United Kingdom, and Canada established the Joint Multinational Training Group – Ukraine (JMTG-U), setting up three new training sites in Khmelnytskyi, Kamianets-Podilskyi, and Yavoriv. The latter, known as the International Centre for Peacekeeping and Security or the Yavoriv Combat Training Centre, was hit by eight Russian missiles in March 2022.

=== Education centres ===
In 2007 the network of exercise and training ranges and centres was optimized, decreasing their number and increasing the specialization of each centre.

Schooling occurs at:

- 169th Training Centre – (Chernihiv) – home to army initial training, for all personnel entering the army, it also houses the 169th Teaching Brigade which specializes in the tactics and skills of tankers and mechanised/motorised infantrymen
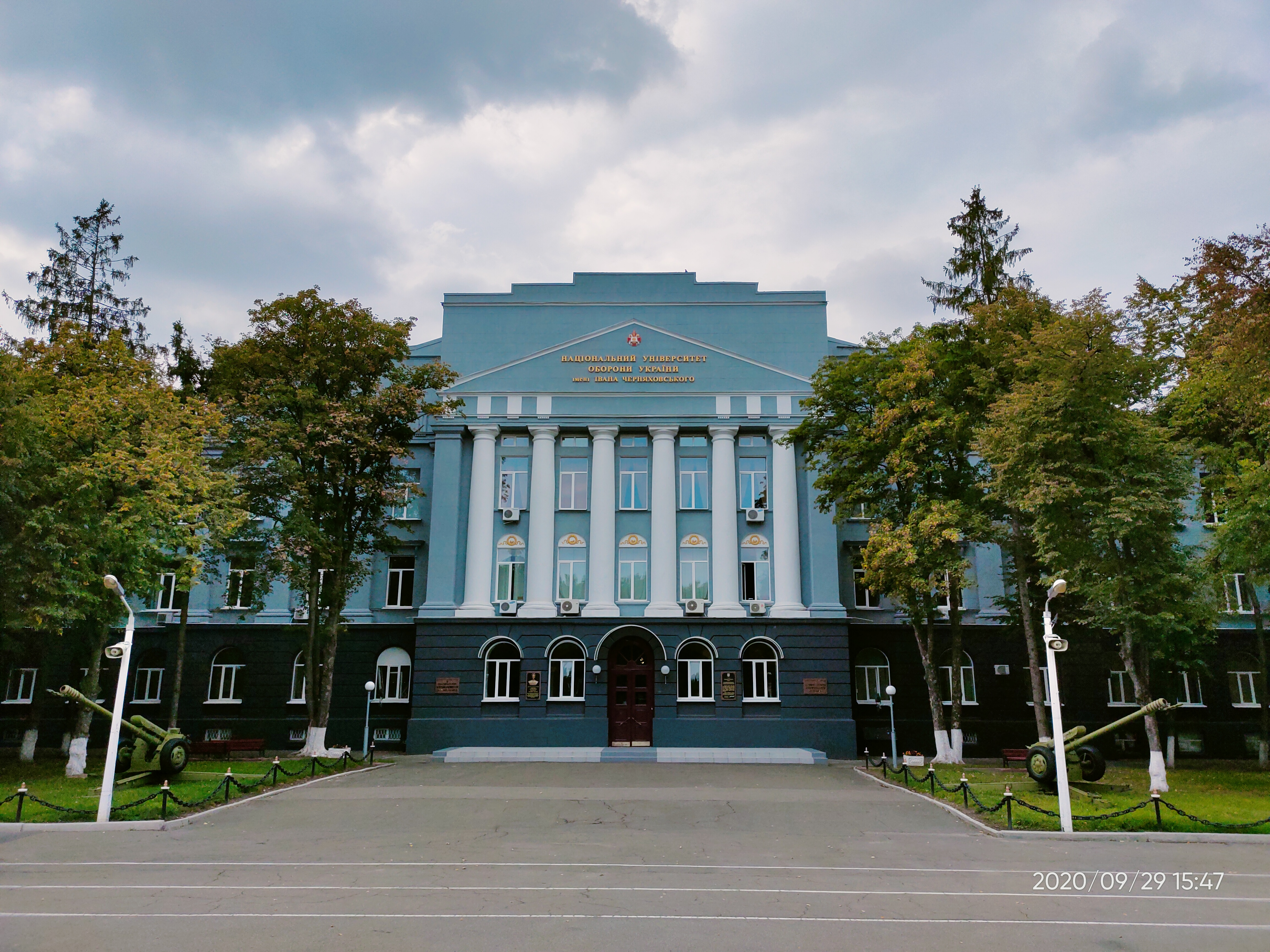
- Ivan Chernyakhovsky National Defense University of Ukraine
  Hetman Petro Sahaidachnyi National Ground Forces Academy – (Lviv) – an academy for all officer cadets seeking a commission, an equivalent of the American West Point and British Sandhurst
- Ivan Chernyakhovsky National Defence University of Ukraine – (Kyiv – teaches specializations like foreign languages, book keeping, cryptology, study of armaments, logistics, etc.
- Ivan Bohun Military High School – (Kyiv) – a JROTC style boarding school which has a curriculum identical to Ukraine's public schools with added focus on military teachings and discipline
- Korolev Signals Institute – (Zhytomyr) – teaches theory and practice of electromagnetic waves and their uses in communication, radio location, eavesdropping, and jamming
- Military Institute of Telecommunications and Information Technologies – (Kyiv) – teaches the following subjects: computer science, systems engineering, telecommunications, security information and communication systems, systems of technical protection of information, and electronic military administration
- Odesa Artillery Academy

== Branches of the Ground Forces ==
=== Mechanized forces ===
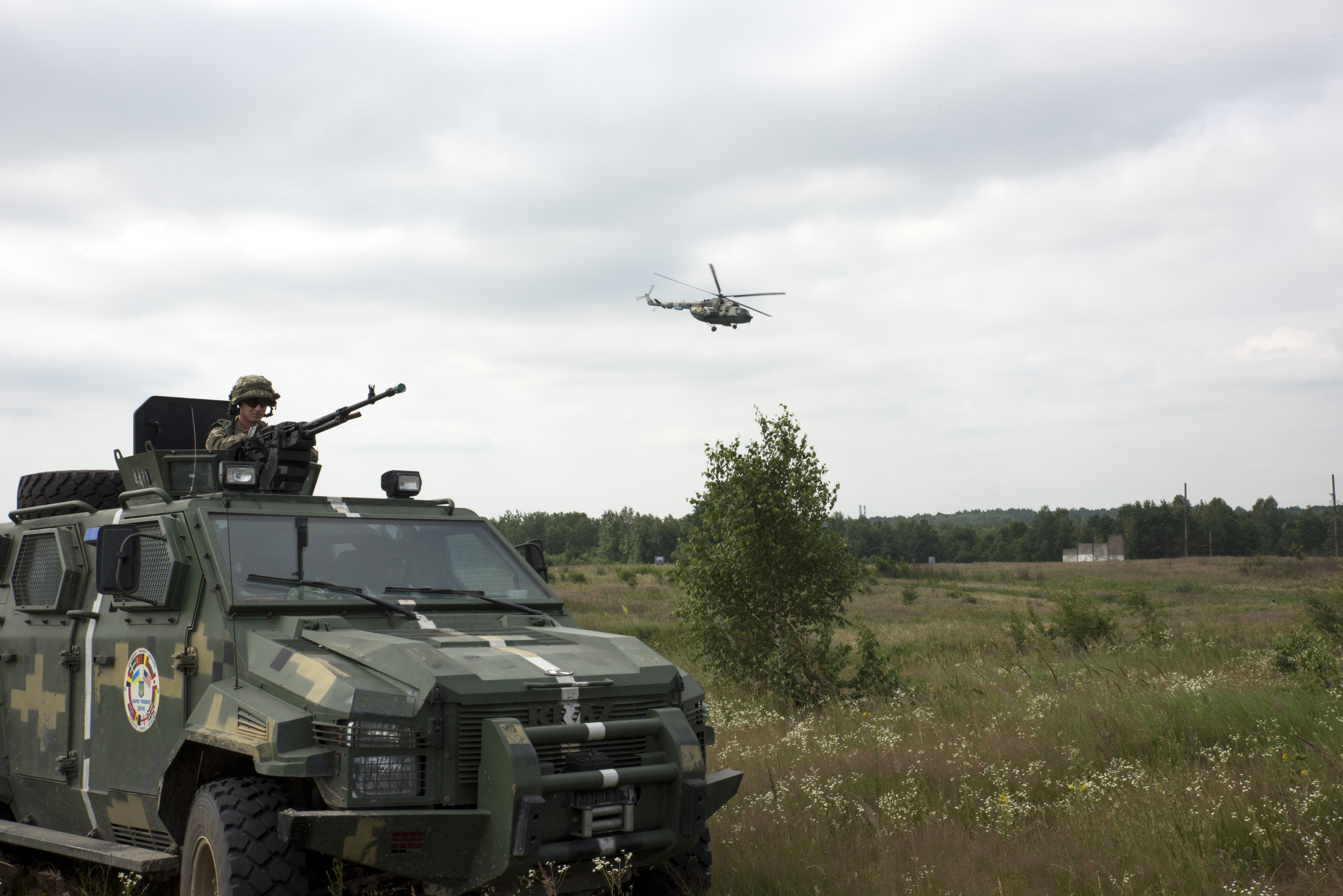
A Ukrainian soldier in a KrAZ Spartan preparing to engage the opposition force during an air assault at Exercise Rapid Trident 16 July 3, 2016

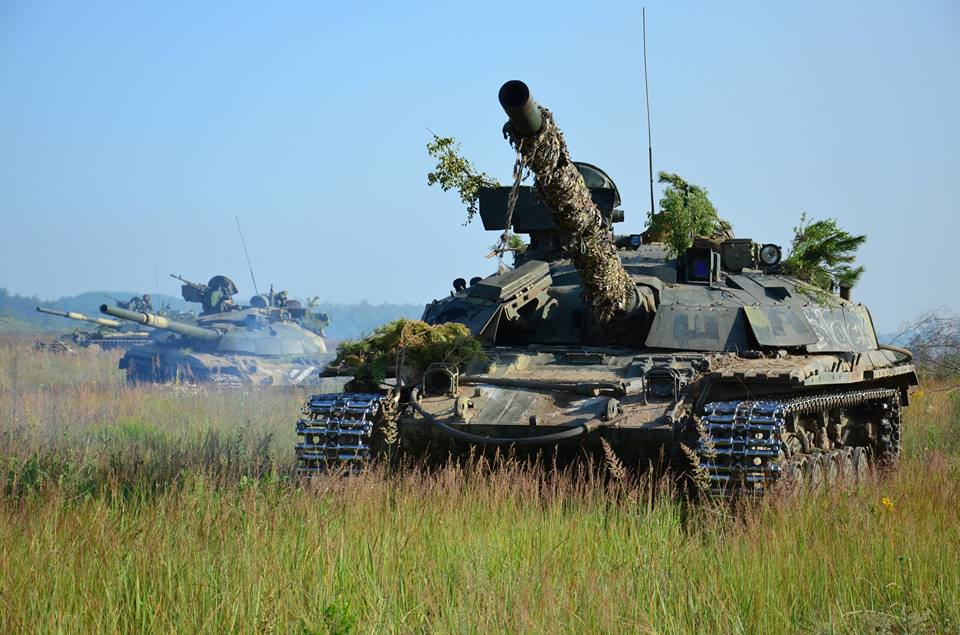
A Ukrainian army T-64BM during a training exercise

Mechanized infantry brigades constitute the largest and primary components of the Ukrainian Ground Forces. Their primary objectives in the case of wartime operations are: capturing and holding targets, maintaining positions, defending against enemy attacks, penetrating enemy lines, and defeating enemy forces on either defensive or offensive operations.

The mechanized infantry forces are equipped with a combination of Soviet-made (part of them modernized), more modern Ukrainian-made, and increasingly Western-made armored vehicles, including variants of the T-80, T-64, (T-64BV Model 2017, T-64BV), T-64BM "Bulat" and T-72UA1 main battle tanks, BTR-4, BTR-60, BTR-70, and BTR-80 wheeled armored personnel carriers, and BMP-1, BMP-2, and BMD-2 tracked infantry fighting vehicles.

In the years after the fall of the Soviet Union, a large number of the former Soviet mechanized infantry and armored formations on Ukrainian soil were disbanded – the IISS said the numbers dropped from 14 divisions in 1992, to two divisions, six brigades, and one independent regiment in 2008.

The mechanized infantry brigades, together with the newer motorized, mountain, rifle infantry and assault infantry brigades, constitute the Infantry Corps of the Ukrainian Ground Forces. The Armored Forces also constitute their own corps. Established in 1991, these two corps are the oldest combat arms of the Ukrainian Ground Forces.

From 2014 until the mid-2020s, the brigade constituted the principal operational echelon for mechanised and armoured formations in the Ukrainian Ground Forces, with higher-level formations largely organized as temporary operational groupings rather than permanent corps or divisions.

=== Light infantry brigades ===
The Ukrainian Ground Forces also include 2 mountain assault infantry brigades and 2 Jäger infantry brigades. All of these units are part of the Infantry Corps and alongside those of Soviet made manufacture, these are being supplied with Western products and arms systems locally produced by the Ukrainian defence industry.

- 10th Mountain Assault Brigade "Edelweiss"
- 128th Mountain Assault Brigade "Zakarpattia"
- 68th Jäger Infantry Brigade "Oleksa Dovbush"
- 152nd Jäger Infantry Brigade

=== Army Aviation ===
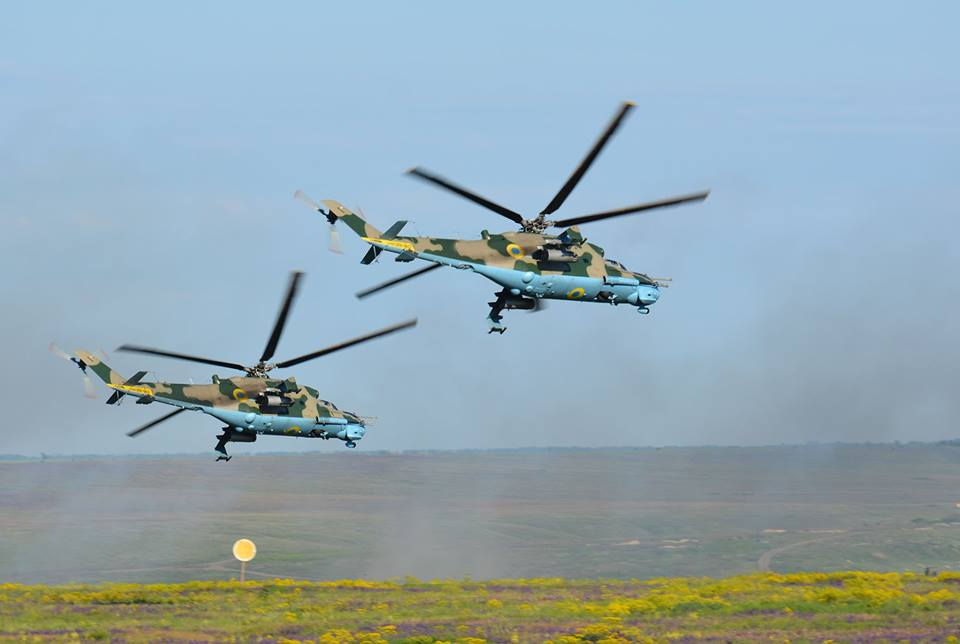
Mil Mi-24 helicopters of the Ukrainian Army Aviation

The Ukrainian Army Aviation provides reconnaissance, tactical fire support and air transport for the Ukrainian Ground Forces in support of its paramount responsibilities to the nation. As of 2017 Ukraine's army fields four Army Aviation brigades in an Army Aviation Command directly subordinated to the Ground Forces HQ, each in support of operational commands of the UGF:

- 11th Army Aviation Brigade, Kherson
- 12th Army Aviation Brigade, Novyi Kalyniv
- 16th Army Aviation Brigade, Brody
- 18th Army Aviation Brigade, Poltava

The Army Aviation's maintenance facility is the 57th Aviation Base in Brody. The service's equipment includes Mi-2, Mi-8, and Mi-24 helicopters.

=== Rocket Forces and Artillery ===
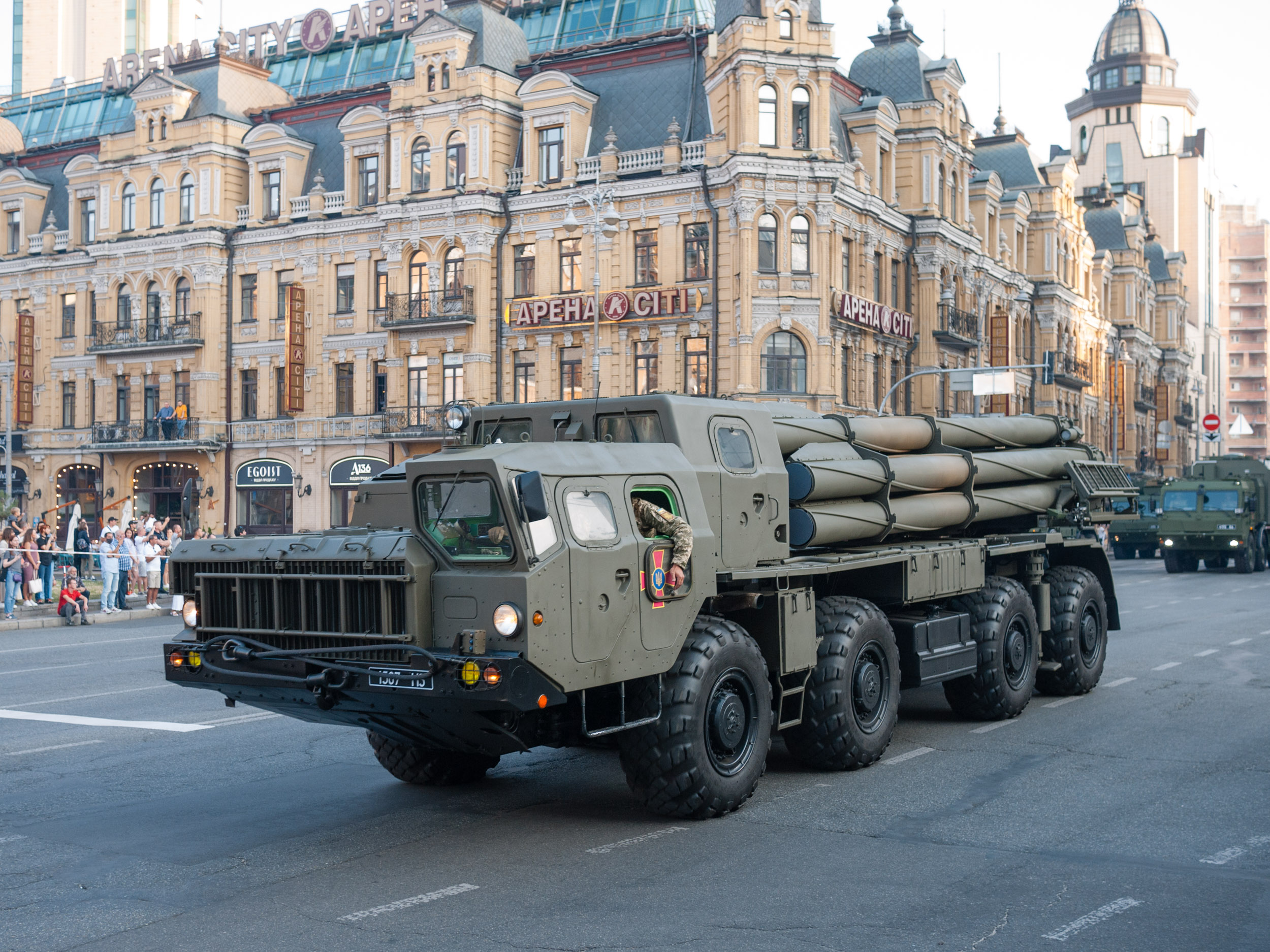
Ukrainian BM-30 Smerch heavy multiple rocket launchers on parade in Kyiv

The RF&FA (Rocket Forces and Field Artillery) Corps constitute one of the oldest combat support corps of the Ukrainian Ground Forces. Established 1991 on the basis of Soviet Army artillery divisions assigned to the AFU and the field artillery of the UGF's infantry and armored divisions, units of this corps provide artillery fires support to formations of the Ground Forces in combat operations and in wartime operational support of other branches of the AFU and other uniformed organizations in fulfillment of its missions to the nation.

=== Ground Forces Air Defence Missile Artillery ===
The Army Anti-Air Defence Missile Artillery regiments and brigade-level battalions or regiments in the infantry and armoured brigades are responsible for protecting troops against enemy air attacks anywhere on the battlefield, and while in combat or in static protection of UGF facilities. The army air defence branch is equipped with a variety of effective surface-to-air missile systems of the air defence regiments and anti-aircraft missile and artillery complexes under the brigades' air defence battalions or regiments. Brigade level units are characterized by their high rate of fire, vitality, maneuverability, and capability of action under all conditions of modern combat arms operations. Surface-to-air missile systems and complexes of operational command level are characterised by their long range and firepower and are equipped with surface-to-air missile complexes Osa, Kub, and Tor. Anti-aircraft missile and artillery complexes that are of brigade level are equipped with various ex-Soviet and Western systems like the Tunguska-M1, Igla MANPADS system, Strela, and Shilka anti-aircraft missile systems.

Formed in 1992, it is also one of the oldest combat support corps of the Ground Forces.

== Structure ==
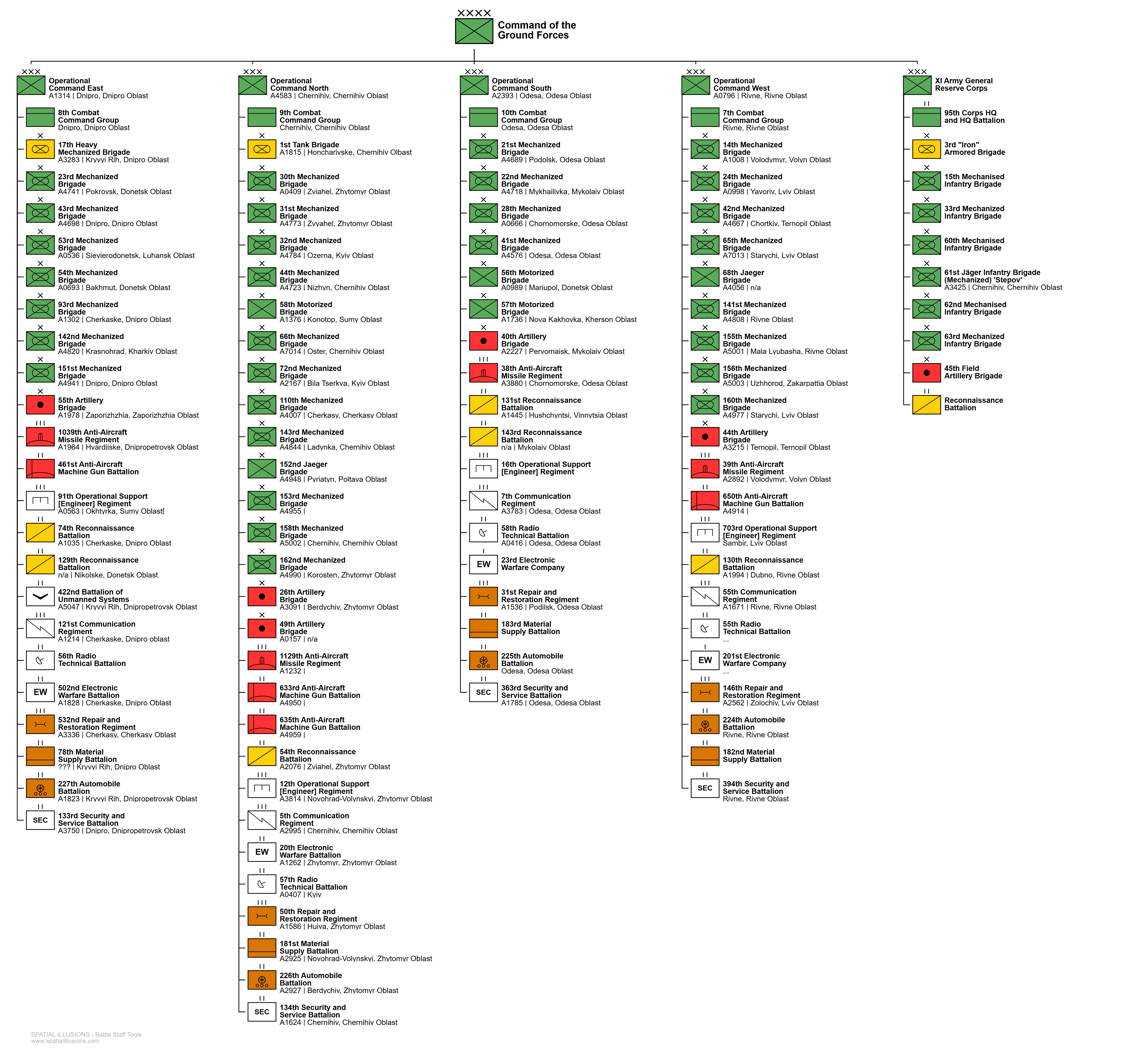
Orbat Ukrainian land forces

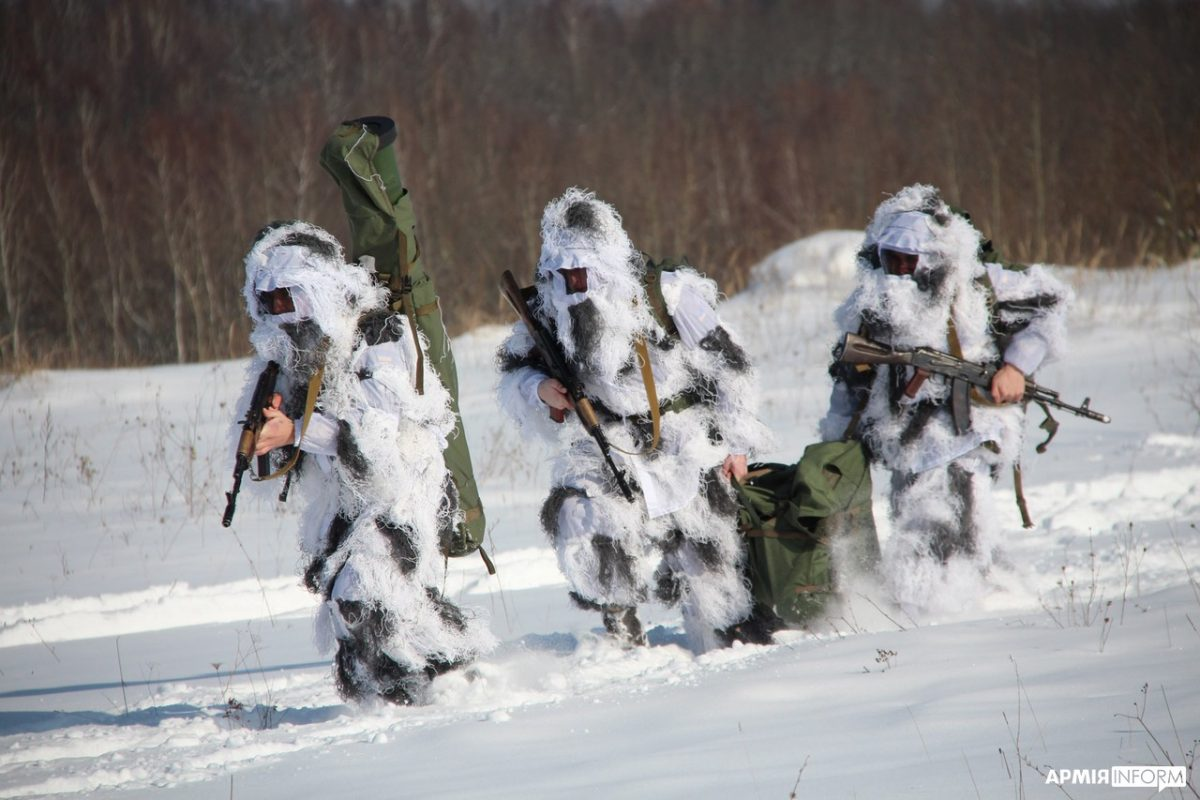
Ukrainian three man anti-tank team moving on foot in a winter maneuver, carrying a Stugna-P ATGM

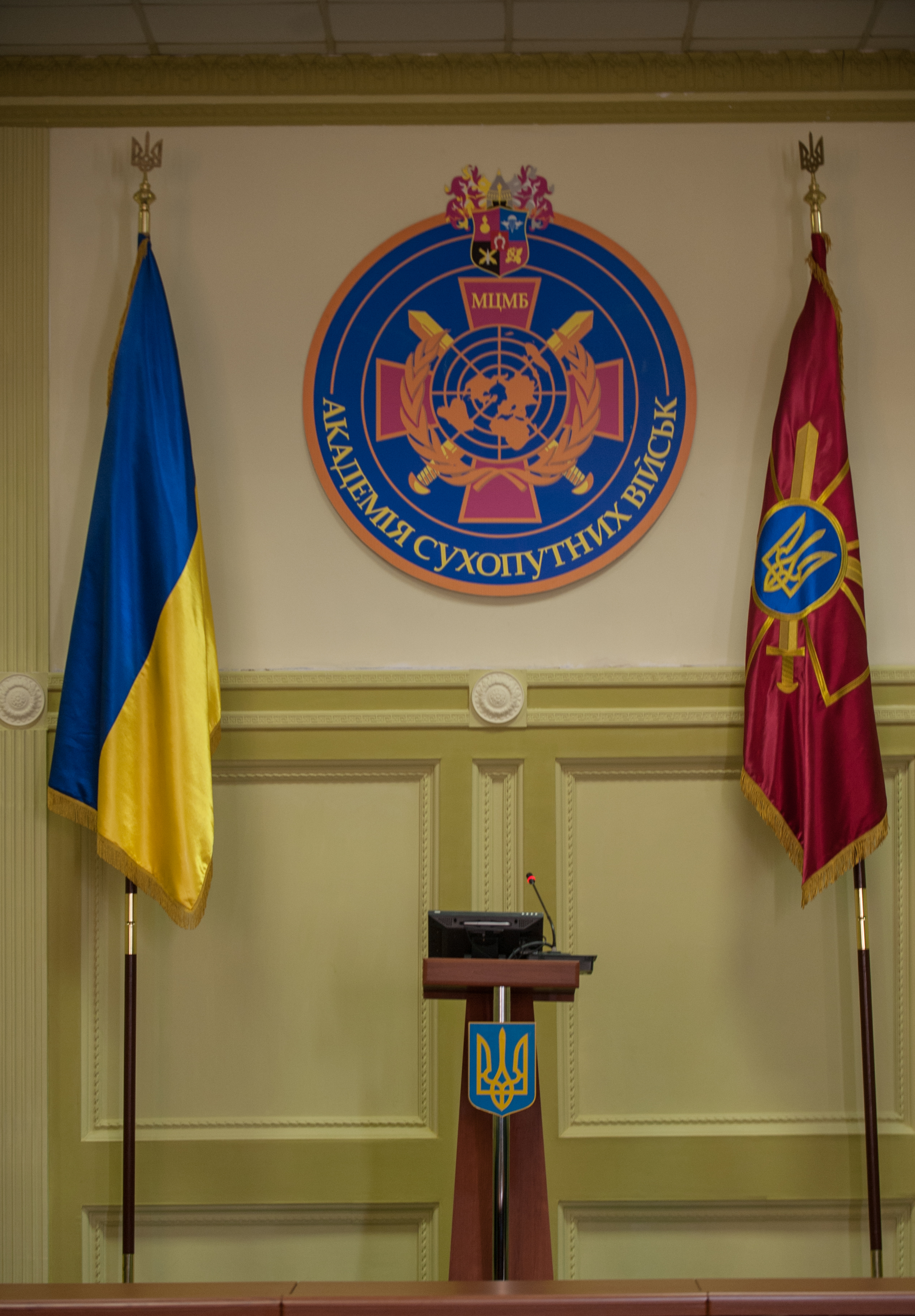
The ensign of the Ukrainian Ground Forces (right) alongside the national flag (left), and the emblem of the National Ground Forces Academy (center)

The war in Donbas caused a radical reform of the Ukrainian Armed Forces in general and the Ukrainian Ground Forces in particular; it built and expanded on the 2011 structure. In 2022 the structure was composed of four Operational Commands: West, North, South, and East.

The full-scale invasion in 2022 led to rapid expansion with the number of military personnel swelling from 250,000 to 980,000 by January 2025. Since early 2025, the Armed Forces of Ukraine have been transitioning to a corps-based command structure, with corps becoming the primary operational-level formations, replacing brigade-centric organization and ad hoc wartime operational groupings.

The reform aims to establish large operational formations integrating multiple brigades with supporting elements, including artillery, unmanned systems, logistics, and intelligence, under a unified command. This structure is intended to improve coordination across an extended фронт and enhance the speed of operational decision-making. The introduction of corps reflects the scale of the war, enabling more effective command and control by grouping numerous brigades into higher-level formations with dedicated headquarters and planning capabilities.

Operational Commands of the Armed Forces of the Armed Forces of Ukraine, established on 15 August 2015, formally established by decree on 6 February 2016

Ground Forces General Command of the Armed Forces of Ukraine (Military Unit [MU] А0105), Kyiv.

Senior command personnel:

- Office of the Commander of the Ukrainian Ground Forces
- Office of Deputy Commander of the Ground Forces
- Chief of Staff and Deputy Commander of the Ground Forces
- Commander of the Territorial Defence Forces of Ukraine
- Commander of Logistics of the Ground Forces General Command
- Chief Sergeant-Major of the Ground Forces of Ukraine

Corps:

- 3rd Army Corps (Assault)
- 9th Army Corps
- 10th Army Corps
- 11th Army Corps (ex-General Reserve)
- 12th Army Corps
- 14th Army Corps
- 15th Army Corps
- 16th Army Corps
- 17th Army Corps
- 18th Army Corps
- 19th Army Corps
- 20th Army Corps
- 21st Army Corps

Formations and units directly subordinated to the Ground Forces General Command:

- 1004th Headquarters Security and Service Battalion (MU А1937) - Kyiv
- President's Own [Guards] Brigade 'Hetman Bohdan Khmelnytsky' (MU А0222) - Kyiv
- 148th Intelligence Command Centre (MU А0189) - Kyiv
- 169th Mobile Repair Technical Base (MU А1405) - Kanatove railway station near Vysoki Bairaky, Kirovohrad Oblast
- 3568th Air Defence Technical Missile Base (MU А4009) - Starokostiantyniv, Ivano-Frankivsk Oblast
- Other units
- Rocket-Missile Forces and Field Artillery Command of the Ground Forces - Commandant of Missile Troops and Field Artillery and Deputy Commander of the Ground Forces
  - 15th Rocket Artillery Brigade 'Kyiv' (MU А1108) - Drohobych, Lviv Oblast, armed with the BM-30 Smerch
  - 19th Missile Brigade Zaporozhian 'Saint Barbara' (MU А4239) - Khmelnytskyi, Khmelnytskyi Oblast, armed with the Tochka-U missile complex
  - 27th Rocket Artillery Brigade 'Kish Otaman Petro Kalnyshevsky' (MU А1476) - Sumy, Sumy Oblast, armed with the BM-27 Uragan
  - 43rd Artillery Brigade 'Hetman Taras Triasylo' (MU А3085) - Divichki Pereyaslav village near Pyriatyn, Kyiv Oblast, armed with the 2S7 Pion
  - 107th Rocket Artillery Brigade (MU А1546) - Kremenchuk, Poltava Oblast, armed with the Vilkha missile complex
- Army Aviation Directorate of the Ground Forces Command/Ukrainian Army Aviation - Chief of Army Aviation of the Ground Forces Command
  - 11th Army Aviation Brigade 'Kherson' (MU А1604) — Chornobayivka Air Base near Kherson, Kherson Oblast - Mi-24, Mi-8, Mi-2
  - 12th Army Aviation Brigade 'Major-General Viktor Pavlenko' (MU А3913) — Novyi Kalyniv, Lviv Oblast - Mi-24, Mi-26, Mi-8/9
  - 16th Army Aviation Brigade 'Brody' (MU А2595) - Brody, Lviv Oblast - Mi-24, Mi-8, Mi-2
  - 18th Army Aviation Brigade 'Igor Sikorsky' (MU А3384) - Poltava, Poltava Oblast - Mi-24, Mi-8, Mi-2
  - 57th Aviation Base [for maintenance, repair and supply of the army aviation] (MU А3595) - Brody, Lviv Oblast
- Territorial Defence Forces General Command - Commander of Territorial Defence Forces (formerly Commander of TD-GFC)
  - Information and Telecommunications Nod of the TDFGC - Kyiv
  - Support units directly subordinated to the TDFGC
  - Four Territorial Defence directorates under the four regional commands of the ground forces directly under the Commander, TDF. Manoeuver elements include Territorial Defence brigades, made up of Territorial Defence battalions and support units and stand-alone separate rifle battalions. Each Ukrainian oblast is covered by its own Territorial Defence Zone, which commands one separate territorial defence brigade and one separate rifle battalion of higher mobility and readiness. In January 2022 the Ukrainian Ministry of Defence had publicised information about its plans for the expansion of the territorial defence forces. The composition of the Territorial Defende Forces (Сил ТрО ЗСУ) should reach 25 brigades for the 25 regions ('один регіон – одна бригада', English: 'one region – one brigade', for the 24 Oblasts and the capital city of Kyiv) with up to 150 battalions ('один батальйон на район' or 'one battalion per raion') for a peacetime strength of up to 10,000 people and over 130,000 upon wartime mobilisation.

=== Educational institutions ===
Training establishments units directly subordinated to the Ground Forces Command:

- National Academy of the Ground Forces 'Hetman Petro Sahaidachnyi' - Lviv, Lviv Oblast
  - Officer cadets training establishments:
    - Faculty of Combat Application of the Forces
    - Faculty of Combined Arms
    - Faculty of Missile Troops and Artillery
    - Faculty for Preparation of Combat (Operational) Support Specialists
  - NCO Personnel Military College
  - Combat Training Centre for Military Units
    - Opposing Force Battalion
    - Imitation and Modelling Simulation Centre
  - 184th Training Centre (MU А2615) - Starichi village, Lviv Oblast
    - 355th Mechanized Infantry Training Regiment (MU А3211)
    - Tank Training Battalion
    - 356th Field Artillery Training Regiment (MU А3618)
      - School of Self-Propelled Artillery
      - School of Towed Artillery
      - School of Anti-Tank Artillery
      - Mortar School
    - 49th Intelligence Training Centre (MU А4138)
    - Combat Engineer Training Battalion
    - Imitation and Modelling Simulation Centre
    - 138th Logistical Training Battalion (MU А2600)
    - School for Initial and Refresher Training of Fire-Fighting Specialists
    - Other departments (інші підрозділи)
- Odesa Military Academy - Odesa, Odesa Oblast
- Armoured and Mechanized Forces Military Institute 'Verkhovna Rada of Ukraine' - Military Faculty of the 'Kharkiv Polytechnic Institute' National Technical University
- 169th Training Centre, Desna
  - 300th Tank Training Regiment
  - 354th Mechanized Training Regiment
  - 6th Field Artillery Training Regiment, Divychky
  - 507th Maintenance Training Battalion
  - 718th Transport Training Battalion
  - 1121st Anti-aircraft Defense Missile Artillery Training Regiment
  - 184th Training Centre (Ukraine), Starychi
  - 49th Reconnaissance Training Center (Ukraine)
  - 355th Mechanised Training Regiment
  - 356th Artillery Training Regiment
  - Tank Training Battalion
  - 138th Material Supply Training Battalion
  - Anti-Tank Missile Specialists School
  - Other units

=== Operational Command West ===
Operational Command West (MU А0796) is headquartered in Rivne and has an area of responsibility covering the Volyn, Zakarpattia, Ivano-Frankivsk, Lviv, Rivne, Ternopil, Khmelnytskyi, and Chernivtsi Oblasts.

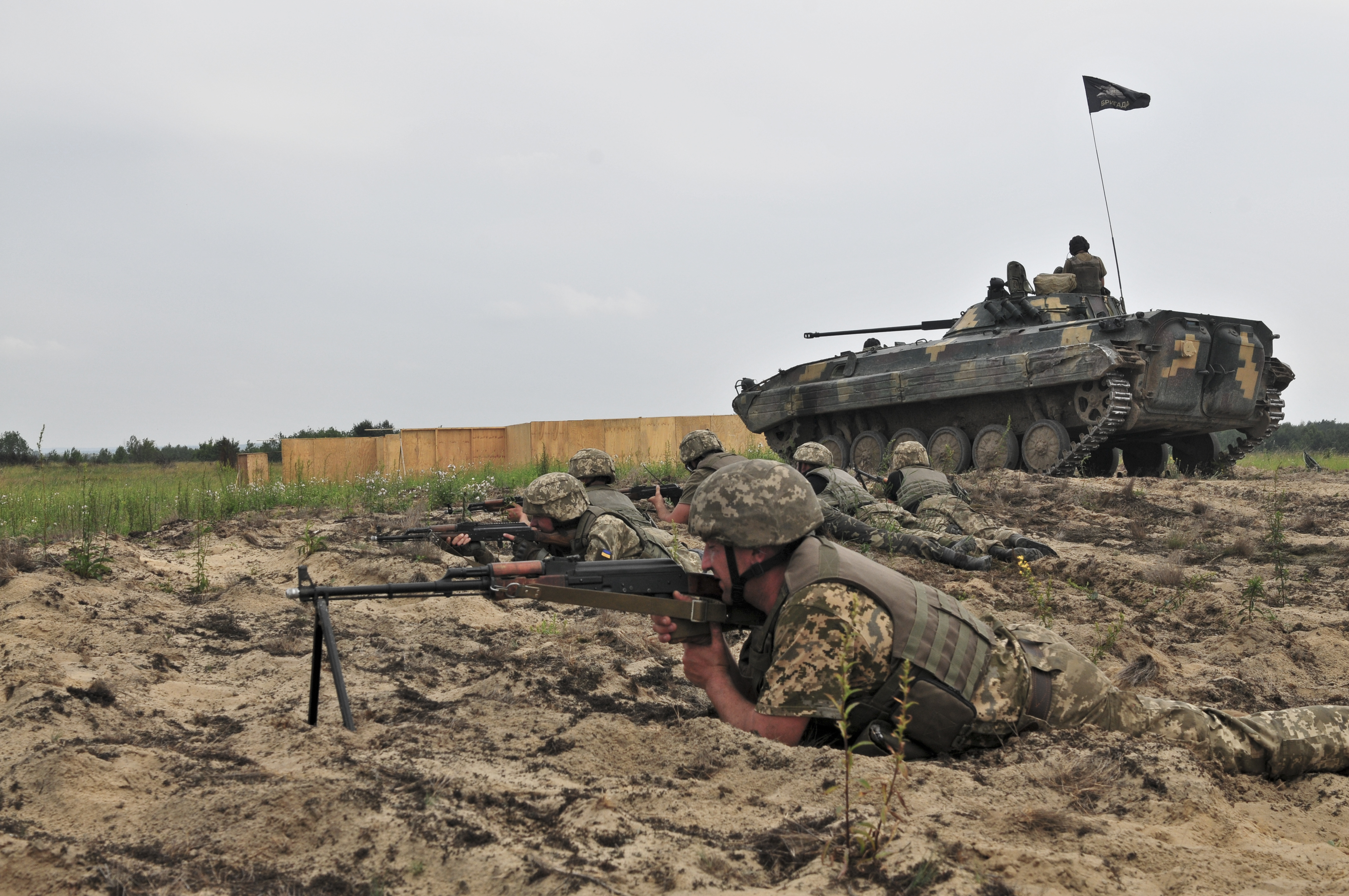
A BMP-2 providing fire support for infantry during an exercise

Headquarters, Rivne

Combat support units:

- 7th Combat Command Group, Rivne, Rivne Oblast
- 394th Security and Service Battalion, Rivne, Rivne Oblast
- 224th Automobile Battalion, Rivne, Rivne Oblast
- 55th Signals Regiment, Rivne, Rivne Oblast
- 346th Information and Telecommunications Nod
- 146th Intelligence Command Centre
- Regional Centre for Electronic Intelligence 'West'
- 436th Electronic Warfare Nod
- 201st Electronic Warfare Company
- 111th NBC Surveillance and Analysis Station
- 124th Joint Logistical Support Centre
- 146th Repair and Overhaul Regiment, Zolochiv
- 182nd Material Supply Battalion
- 233rd Combined Arms Training Range
- 90th Base for Artillery Ammunitions
- other specialised and logistical units
- Military comissariates
- Territorial centres for recruitment and social policy implementation

Combat units:

- 14th Mechanised Brigade 'Roman the Great' (MU A2331), Volodymyr-Volynsky, Volyn Oblast
- 24th Mechanised Brigade 'King Daniel' (MU A0998), Yavoriv, Lviv Oblast
- 10th Mountain Assault Brigade (MU A4267), Kolomyia, Ivano Frankivsk Oblast
- 128th Mountain Assault Infantry Transcarpathian Brigade (MU A1556), Mukachevo, Zakarpattia Oblast
- 44th Field Artillery Brigade 'Danylo Apostol' (MU A1428), Ternopil, Ternopil Oblast
- 39th Air Defence Missile Regiment, Volodymyr-Volynsky, Volyn Oblast
- 703rd Operational Support [Engineer] Regiment, Sambir, Lviv Oblast
- 130th Reconnaissance Battalion, Dubno, Rivne Oblast

Territorial Defence units:

Regional Directorate [of Territorial Defence] 'West', Rivne, Rivne Oblast

- Information and Telecommunications Nod of Regional Directorate 'West', Rivne, Rivne Oblast
- Security and Service Company of Regional Directorate 'West', Rivne, Rivne Oblast
- Territorial Defence Zone of the Volyn Oblast
  - 2nd Rifle Battalion
  - 100th Volyn Territorial Defence Brigade (cadred) (MU А7028)
- Territorial Defence Zone of the Rivne Oblast
  - 14th Rifle Battalion
  - 104th Rivne Territorial Defence Brigade (cadred) (MU А7032)
- Territorial Defence Zone of the Lviv Oblast
  - 10th Rifle Battalion
  - 103rd Lviv Territorial Defence Brigade (cadred) (MU А7031)
- Territorial Defence Zone of the Ternopil Oblast
  - 16th Rifle Battalion
  - 105th Ternopil Territorial Defence Brigade (cadred) (MU А7033)
- Territorial Defence Zone of the Khmelnytsky Oblast
  - 19th Rifle Battalion
- Territorial Defence Zone of the Zakarpattia Oblast
  - 5th Rifle Battalion
  - 101st Zakarpattian Territorial Defence Brigade (cadred) (MU А7029)
- Territorial Defence Zone of the Ivano-Frankivsk Oblast
  - 7th Rifle Battalion
  - 102nd Ivano-Frankivsk Territorial Defence Brigade (cadred) (MU А7030)
- Territorial Defence Zone of the Chernivtsi Oblast
  - 21st Rifle Battalion
  - 107th Chernivtsi Territorial Defence Brigade (cadred) (MU А7035)

=== Operational Command North ===
Operational Command North (MU 4583) is headquartered in Chernihiv and has an area of responsibility covering the Zhytomyr, Kyiv, Poltava, Sumy, Cherkasy, and Chernihiv Oblasts and the capital city of Kyiv.

==== Headquarters, Chernihiv ====
Combat support units:

- 9th Combat Command Group, Chernihiv, Chernihiv Oblast
- 134th Security and Service Battalion (MU А1624), Chernihiv, Chernihiv Oblast
- 226th Automobile Battalion (MU А2927), Berdychiv, Zhytomyr Oblast
- 5th Signal Regiment (MU А2995), Chernihiv, Chernihiv Oblast
- 367th Information and Telecommunications Nod (MU А2984), Chernihiv, Chernihiv Oblast
- 90th Intelligence Command Centre
- Regional ELINT Centre 'North' (MU А2622), Chernihiv, Chernihiv Oblast
  - 121st Maneuver ELINT Centre (MU А1783), Chernihiv, Chernihiv Oblast
  - 122nd ELINT Centre (MU А1993), Chuhuiv, Kharkiv Oblast
- 20th Electronic Warfare Battalion (MU А1262), Zhytomyr, Zhytomyr Oblast
- 12th Operational Support [Engineer] Regiment (MU А3814), Novohrad-Volynskyi, Zhytomyr Oblast
- 107th NBC Surveillance and Analysis Station
- 125th Topographic Unit
- 229th Joint Logistical Support Centre
- 50th Repair and Overhaul Regiment (MU А1586), Huiva, Zhytomyr Oblast
- 181st Material Supply Battalion (MU A2925), Novohrad-Volynskyi, Zhytomyr Oblast
- Other specialised and logistical units
- 1322nd Artillery Ammunitions Base
- 242nd Combined Arms Training Range
- Military comissariates (військові комісаріати)
- Territorial centres for recruitment and social policy implementation

Combat units:

- 1st Tank Brigade 'Severia' (MU А1815), Honcharivske, Chernihiv Oblast
- 12th Tank Battalion (MU А0932), Honcharivske, Chernihiv Oblast
- 30th Mechanised Brigade 'Knyaz Konstanty Ostrogski' (MU A0409), Novohrad-Volynskyi, Zhytomyr Oblast
- 58th Motorised Brigade 'Hetman Ivan Vyhovsky' (MU А1376), Konotop, Sumy Oblast
- 72nd Mechanised Brigade 'Black Zaporizhians' (MU А2167), Bila Tserkva, Kyiv Oblast область
- 26th Artillery Brigade 'Major-General Roman Dashkevich' (MU А3091), Berdychiv, Zhytomyr Oblast
- 1129th Air Defence Missile Regiment 'Bila Tserkva' (MU А1232), Bila Tserkva, Kyiv Oblast
- 54th Reconnaissance Battalion 'Mykhailo Tisha' (MU А2076), Novohrad-Volynskyi, Zhytomyr Oblast
- Possibly a security company based at Kyiv Boryspil Airport

Territorial Defence units:

Regional Directorate [of Territorial Defence] 'North', Kyiv

- Information and Telecommunications Nod of Regional Directorate 'North', Kyiv
- Security and Service Company of Regional Directorate 'North', Kyiv
- Territorial Defence Zone of the City of Kyiv
  - Rifle Battalion
  - 112th City of Kyiv Territorial Defence Brigade (cadred) (MU А7040)
- Territorial Defence Zone of the Kyiv Oblast
  - 8th Rifle Battalion
  - 114th Kyiv Oblast Territorial Defence Brigade (cadred) (MU А7042)
- Territorial Defence Zone of the Zhytomyr Oblast
  - 4th Rifle Battalion
  - 115th Zhytomyr Territorial Defence Brigade (cadred) (MU А7043)
- Territorial Defence Zone of the Poltava Oblast
  - 13th Rifle Battalion
  - 116th Poltava Territorial Defence Brigade (cadred) (MU А7044)
- Territorial Defence Zone of the Sumy Oblast
  - 15th Rifle Battalion
  - 117th Sumy Territorial Defence Brigade (cadred) (MU А7045)
- Territorial Defence Zone of the Cherkasy Oblast
  - 20th Rifle Battalion
  - 118th Cherkasy Territorial Defence Brigade (cadred) (MU А7046)
- Territorial Defence Zone of the Chernihiv Oblast
  - 22nd Rifle Battalion
  - 119th Chernihiv Territorial Defence Brigade (cadred) (MU А7047)

=== Operational Command South ===
Operational Command South (MU 2393) is headquartered in Odesa and has an area of responsibility covering the Vinnytsia, Kirovohrad, Mykolaiv, Odesa, and Kherson Oblasts.

Headquarters, Odesa

Combat support units:

- 10th Combat Command Group, Odesa, Odesa Oblast
- 363rd Security and Service Battalion (MU А1785), Odesa, Odesa Oblast
- 225th Automobile Battalion, Odesa, Odesa Oblast
- 7th Signal Regiment (MU А3783), Odesa, Odesa Oblast
- 64th Information and Telecommunications Nod (MU А1283), Odesa, Odesa Oblast
- 91st Intelligence Command Centre (MU А2152)
- Regional ELINT Centre 'South' (MU А3438)
  - 78th ELINT Centre (MU А2395)
  - 79th ELINT Centre (MU А2412)
  - 82nd Manoeuver ELINT Centre (MU А2444)
- 23rd Electronic Warfare Company
- 16th Operational Support [Engineer] Regiment
- 108th NBC Surveillance and Analysis Station
- 46th Joint Logistical Support Centre
- 31st Repair and Overhaul Regiment
- 183rd Material Supply Battalion
- 1513th Artillery Ammunitions Base
- 235th Joint Forces for Preparation of Military Units and Sub-Units
- 241st Combined Arms Training Range
- Other specialised and logistical units
- Military comissariates
- Territorial centres for recruitment and social policy implementation

Combat units:

- 28th Mechanised Brigade 'Participants in the First Winter Campaign' (MU А0666), Chornomorske, Odesa Oblast
- 56th Motorised Brigade 'Mariupol' Brigade (MU А0989), Mariupol, Donetsk Oblast
- 57th Motorised Brigade 'Kosh otaman Kost Hordiyenko' (MU В4533), Nova Kakhovka, Kherson Oblast
- 59th Motorised Brigade 'Yakіv Gandzyuk' (MU А1619), Haisyn, Vinnytsia Oblast
- 40th Artillery Brigade 'Grand Duke Vytautas' (MU А2227), Pervomaisk, Mykolaiv Oblast
- 38th Air Defence Missile Regiment 'Major-General Yuriy Tyutyunnyk' (MU А3880), Nova Odesa, Mykolaiv Oblast
- 131st Reconnaissance Battalion (MU В1109), Gushchintsy, Vinnytsia Oblast
- 143rd Reconnaissance Battalion (MU В1053), unidentified location, Mykolaiv Oblast

Territorial Defence units:

Regional Directorate [of Territorial Defence] 'South', Odesa, Odesa Oblast

- Information and Telecommunications Nod of Regional Directorate 'South', Odesa, Odesa Oblast
- Security and Service Company of Regional Directorate 'South', Odesa, Odesa Oblast
- Territorial Defence Zone of the Vinnytsia Oblast
  - 1st Rifle Battalion
  - 120th Vinnytsia Territorial Defence Brigade (cadred) (MU А7048)
- Territorial Defence Zone of the Kirovohrad Oblast
  - 9th Rifle Battalion
  - 121st Kirovohrad Territorial Defence Brigade (cadred) (MU А7049)
- Territorial Defence Zone of the Odesa Oblast
  - 12th Rifle Battalion
  - 122nd Odesa Territorial Defence Brigade (cadred) (MU А7051)
- Territorial Defence Zone of the Mykolaiv Oblast
  - 11th Rifle Battalion
  - 123rd Mykolaiv Territorial Defence Brigade (cadred) (MU А7052)
- Territorial Defence Zone of the Kherson Oblast
  - 18th Rifle Battalion
  - 124th Kherson Territorial Defence Brigade (cadred) (MU А7053)

=== Operational Command East ===
Operational Command East (MU 1314) is headquartered in Dnipro and has an area of responsibility covering Dnipropetrovsk, Donetsk, Zaporizhzhia, Luhansk, and Kharkiv Oblasts with the Russian-occupied territory of Crimea nominally attached to it as the Separate Ground Forces Area (Окремий військово-сухопутний район). OC East is the general command responsible for frontline regular UGF formations fighting in the war in Donbas and the ongoing Russian invasion.

Headquarters, Dnipro (as the result of the war in Donbas, a split from OC "South")

Combat support units:

- 8th Combat Command Group,
- 133rd Security and Service Battalion (MU А3750), Dnipro, Dnipropetrovsk Oblast
- 227th Automobile Battalion (MU А1823), Kryvyi Rih, Dnipropetrovsk Oblast
- 121st Signal Regiment (MU А1214), Cherkaske, Dnipropetrovsk Oblast
- 368th Information and Telecommunications Nod (MU А2326), Dnipro, Dnipropetrovsk Oblast
- 188th Intelligence Command Centre
- Regional ELINT Centre 'East'
- 502nd Electronic Warfare Regiment (MU А1828), Cherkaske, Dnipropetrovsk Oblast
- 91st Operational Support [Engineer] Regiment (MU А0563), Okhtyrka, Sumy Oblast
- 102nd NBC Surveillance and Analysis Station (102 розрахунково-аналітична станція)
- 532nd Repair and Overhaul Regiment (MU А3336)
- 218th Joint Logistical Support Centre
- 78th Material Supply Battalion (MU В4756), Kryvyi Rih, Dnipropetrovsk Oblast
- 222nd Central Artillery Ammunitions Base
- 239th Combined Arms Training Range
- Other specialised and logistical units
- Military commissariats
- Territorial centres for recruitment and social policy implementation

Combat units:

- 17th Kryvyi Rih Tank Brigade Konstantin Pestushko (MU А3283), Kryvyi Rih
- 53rd Mechanised Brigade Knyaz Vladimir Monomakh (MU А0536), Sievierodonetsk, Luhansk Oblast
- 54th Mechanised Brigade Hetman Ivan Mazepa (MU А0693), Bakhmut, Donetsk Oblast
- 92nd Assault Brigade Kosh otaman Ivan Sirko (MU А0501), Chuhuiv, Kharkiv Oblast
- 93rd Mechanised Brigade Kholodny Yar (MU А1302), Cherkaske, Dnipropetrovsk Oblast
- 55th Artillery Brigade Zaporozhian Sich (MU А1978), Zaporizhzhia, Zaporizhzhia Oblast
- 1039th Air Defence Missile Regiment (MU А1964), Hvardiiske, Dnipropetrovsk Oblast
- 74th Reconnaissance Battalion (MU А1035), Cherkaske, Dnipropetrovsk Oblast

Territorial Defence units:

Regional Directorate [of Territorial Defence] 'East', Dnipro, Dnipropetrovsk Oblast

- Information and Telecommunications Nod of Regional Directorate 'East', Dnipro, Dnipropetrovsk Oblast
- Security and Service Company of Regional Directorate 'East', Dnipro, Dnipropetrovsk Oblast
- Territorial Defence Zone of the Dnipropetrovsk Oblast
  - 3rd Rifle Battalion
  - 108th Dnipropetrovsk Territorial Defence Brigade (MU А7036)
- Territorial Defence Zone of the Kharkiv Oblast
  - 17th Rifle Battalion
  - 113th Kharkiv Territorial Defence Brigade (MU А7041)
- Territorial Defence Zone of the Zaporizhzhia Oblast
  - 6th Rifle Battalion (6-й окремий стрілецький батальйон)
  - 110th Zaporizhzhia Territorial Defence Brigade (MUА7038)
- Territorial Defence Zone of the Donetsk Oblast
  - Rifle Battalion
  - 109th Donetsk Territorial Defence Brigade (MU А7037)
- Territorial Defence Zone of the Luhansk Oblast
  - Rifle Battalion
  - 111th Luhansk Territorial Defence Brigade (MU А7039)

Ground Forces Area - Russian-occupied Crimea, these structures exist only nominally:

- Territorial Defence Zone of Sevastopol
  - Rifle Battalion
  - Territorial Defence Brigade
- Territorial Defence Zone of the Crimean Autonomous Republic
  - Rifle Battalion
  - Territorial Defence Brigade

=== XI Army General Reserve Corps ===
The XI Army General Reserve Corps includes the following:

- 95th Corps HQ and HQ Battalion
- 173rd Reserve Battalion
- 3rd "Iron" Armored Brigade
- 15th Mechanised Infantry Brigade
- 33rd Mechanized Infantry Brigade
- 45th Artillery Brigade
- 60th Mechanised Infantry Brigade
- 61st Jäger Infantry Brigade (Mechanized) 'Stepov' (MU A3425), Chernihiv, Chernihiv Oblast
- 62nd Mechanised Infantry Brigade
- 63rd Mechanized Infantry Brigade
- 93rd Anti-Tank Battalion
- 152nd Reconnaissance Battalion
- 510th Maintenance Battalion

The UGF Reserve Corps (Ukrainian: Корпус резерву) - as it had been then named upon its foundation - was raised in 2016 and was directly subordinated to the General Staff via the Commander of the Ground Forces. It is also called the Army Strategic Reserve Corps. Its main function when it was founded is to prepare and provide administrative support and control over reservists of the ground forces. According to plans the Reserve Corps was to be fully operational by 2020 with reserve servicemen in three separate categories:

- Operational Reserve of the First Line (оперативний резерв першої черги) – includes about 50,000 reserve servicemen with extensive combat training (60 days of combat training every two years) in the reserve companies and batteries of the operational army brigades and regiments, with those reservists to become casualty replacements in wartime
- Operational Reserve of the Second Line (оперативний резерв другої черги) – includes reserve servicemen with combat training of 30 days every two years in Territorial Defence Forces brigades. In addition, the command personnel will undergo 10 days training cycles yearly. The XI Army Corps by that time was to also act as the pool formation for those territorial brigades and transfer them to the ground forces' operational commands in wartime as needed.
- Mobilisation Reserve (мобілізаційний резерв) – includes all Ukrainian citizens, who are eligible for mobilisation in case of war, but do not belong to the first or the second line operational reserve. They can be used to form support units or to boost the service numbers of the territorial brigades as casualty replacements.

In that organisation, the XI Army Reserve Corps - as it has been currently named since 2024 - is currently engaged in the ongoing Russian invasion of Ukraine and its reservists have fought in every ground operation of the conflict.

=== Geographic distribution ===
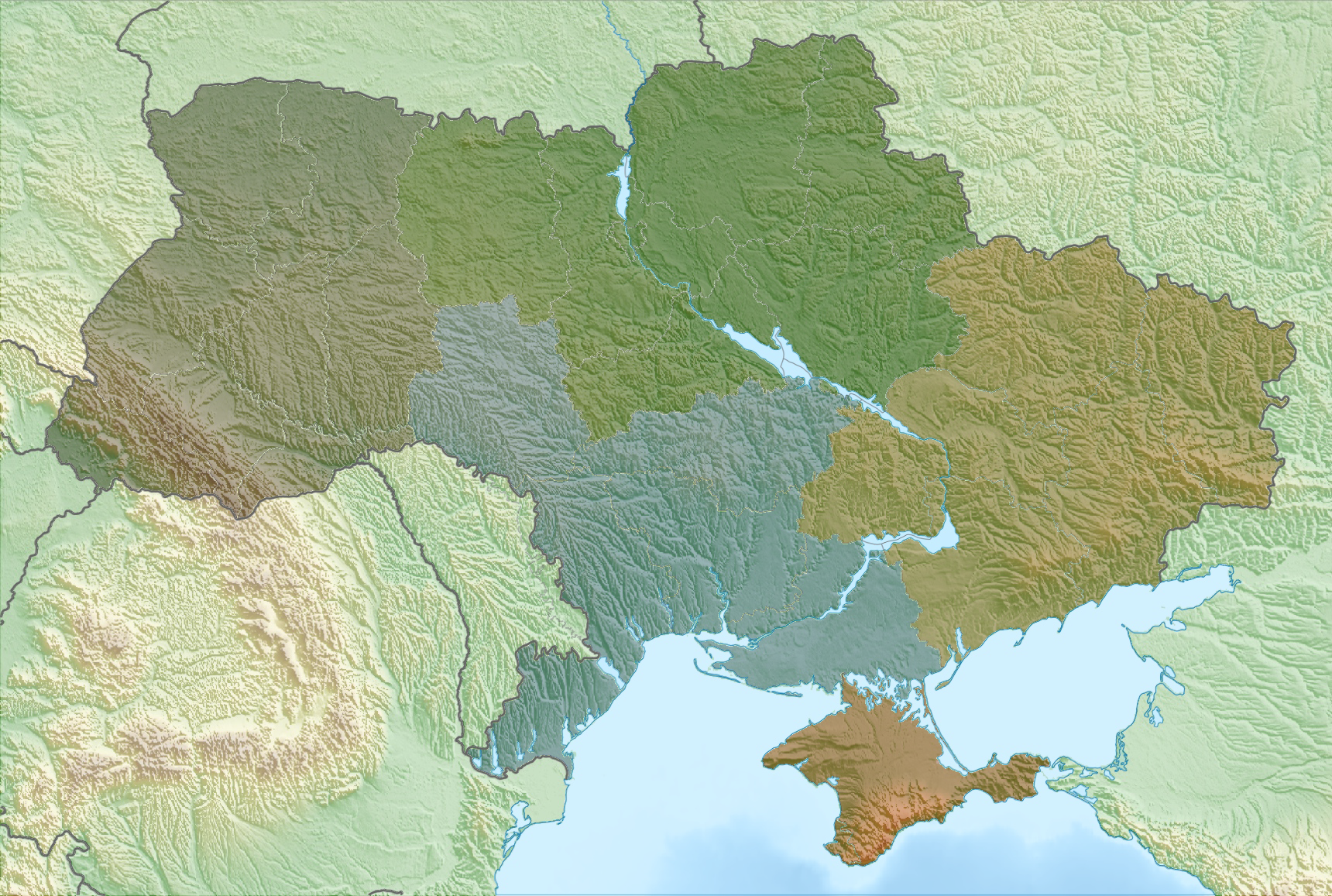
Location of Ukrainian Ground Forces units
Tank, Mechanized, Motorized, Mountain Assault, Artillery, Rocket Artillery, Army Aviation
Regiments: Rocket Artillery, Anti-Aircraft Missile Artillery, Engineer
units in Italics are directly subordinated to Ground Forces Command

== List of commanders ==
Title "Commander-in-Chief" (Ukrainian: Головнокомандувач) 1992 – 2005, "Commander" (Ukrainian: Командувач) 2005 – present

- 1992–1994: No appointment (see above text)
- 1994–1998: Colonel General Vasyl Sobkov
- 1998–2001: Colonel General Petro Shulyak
- 2001–2002: Colonel General Oleksandr Zatynaiko
- 2002–2004: Colonel General Petro Shulyak
- 2004–2006: Colonel General Mykola Petruk
- 2006–2007: Lieutenant General Valeriy Frolov
- 2007–2009: Colonel General Ivan Svyda
- 2009–2014: Colonel General Henadii Vorobiov
- 2014–2016: Lieutenant General Anatoliy Pushnyakov
- 2016–2019: Colonel General Serhiy Popko
- 2019–2024: Colonel General Oleksandr Syrskyi
- 2024–2024: General Oleksandr Pavliuk
- 2024–2025: Major General Mykhailo Drapatyi
- 2025–2026: Brigadier general Hennadii Shapovalov
- 2026–present: Brigadier General Svyatoslav Zaitsya

== Military ranks ==
As a non-member state, NATO rank codes are not used in Ukraine, they are presented here for reference purposes only

As part of the new uniforms the Ukrainian Ground Forces unveiled in August 2016, the stars that traditionally adorn shoulder straps in the militaries of post-Soviet states were replaced by diamonds.

=== General and officer ranks ===
Rank group	General / flag officers				Senior officers			Junior officers
Ukrainian Ground Forces
Ukrainian Ground Forces	Генерал; Heneral	Генерал-лейтенант; Heneral-leitenant	Генерал-майор; Heneral-maior	Бригадний генерал Bryhadnyi heneral	Полковник; Polkovnyk	Підполковник; Pidpolkovnyk	Майор; Maior	Капітан; Kapitan	Старший лейтенант Starshyi leitenant	Лейтенант; Leitenant	Молодший лейтенант Molodshyi leitenant

=== Other ranks and NCOs ===
Rank group	Senior NCOs						Junior NCOs		Enlisted
Ukrainian Ground Forces
Ukrainian Ground Forces	Головний майстер-сержант Holovnyi maister-serzhant	Старший майстер-сержант Starshyi maister-serzhant	Майстер-сержант; Maister-serzhant	Штаб-сержант; Shtab-serzhant	Головний сержант Holovnyi serzhant	Старший сержант Starshyi serzhant	Сержант; Serzhant	Молодший сержант Molodshyi serzhant	Старший солдат Starshyi soldat	Солдат; Soldat

== Equipment ==
=== Uniforms ===
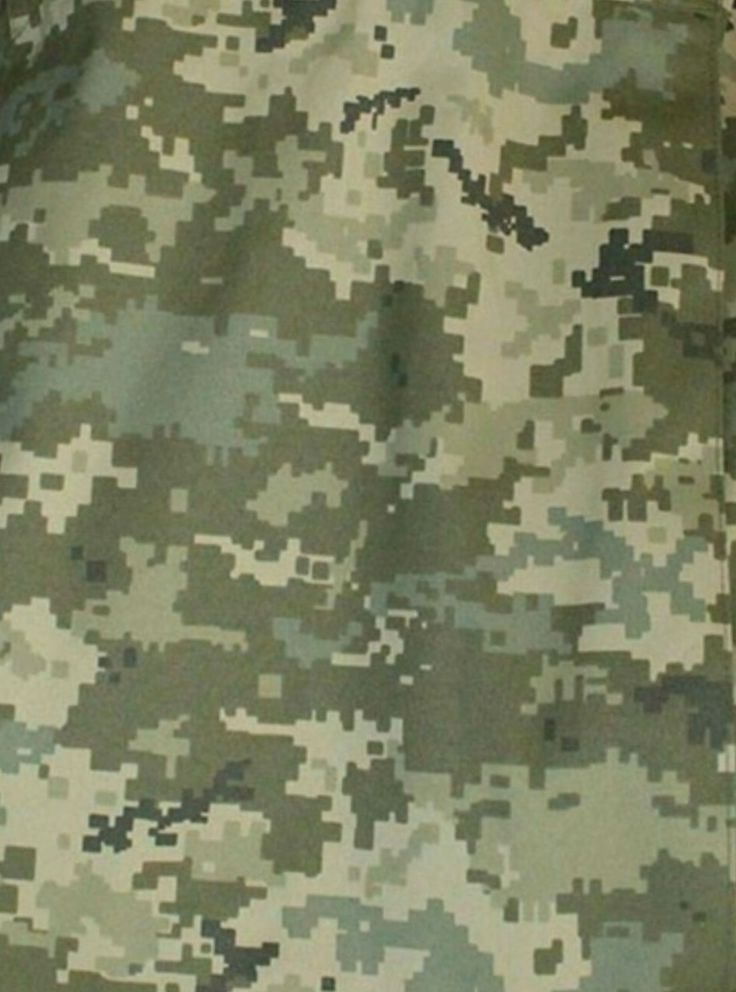
Ukrainian MM-14 pixelated camouflage pattern, replacing the old Dubok camouflage

The Ukrainian army unveiled its new uniforms on 24 August 2016 (Independence Day of Ukraine). The new uniforms are modeled on British military styles, having a modern pixelated digital camouflage pattern, called the MM-14 pattern. They also incorporate details from the uniforms worn by the Ukrainian People's Army. The new cap includes an insignia of a Ukrainian Cossack grasping a cross.

=== Armour ===
The majority of tanks and armoured vehicles in Ukrainian service as of 2022 were of Soviet origin, such as the T-64, T-80, and T-72 tank families, the BMP-1 and BMP-2 infantry fighting vehicle, and the BTR-80 armoured personnel carrier. Tank donations from the West to Ukraine have been mostly T-72 variants, with the majority of Western tanks being from the Leopard 1 and Leopard 2 families. Western armoured vehicles donated to Ukraine include the Bradley and Marder infantry fighting vehicles, the Stryker, M113, and Roshel Senator armoured personnel carriers, and the Humvee family of light military vehicles. The Ukrainian military, as of 2024, also operates a number of captured Russian T-90 main battle tanks and BMP-3 IFVs.

=== Artillery ===
Before Western artillery systems started being donated in 2022, Ukraine operated an artillery park that mostly consisted of older Soviet-designed equipment. Soviet self-propelled guns in Ukrainian service include the 2S1 Carnation, the 2S3 Akatsiya, the 2S7 Pion, and the 2S19 Msta-S. The Ukrainian army also operates the Ukrainian produced 2S22 Bohdana self propelled howitzer and the BM-27 and BM-30 rocket artillery systems, with the D-20 and Msta-B towed guns being used primarily by motorised infantry formations. Western artillery donated to Ukraine consists mostly of the M777 towed howitzer, the M119 and L119 towed field guns, the M109, PzH 2000 and AHS Krab self-propelled howitzers, and the HIMARS and M270 rocket artillery systems.

=== Aviation ===
Ukrainian Army Aviation operates three families of Soviet-designed helicopters: the Mi-2 for training, and the Mi-8 and Mi-24 for transport and attack.

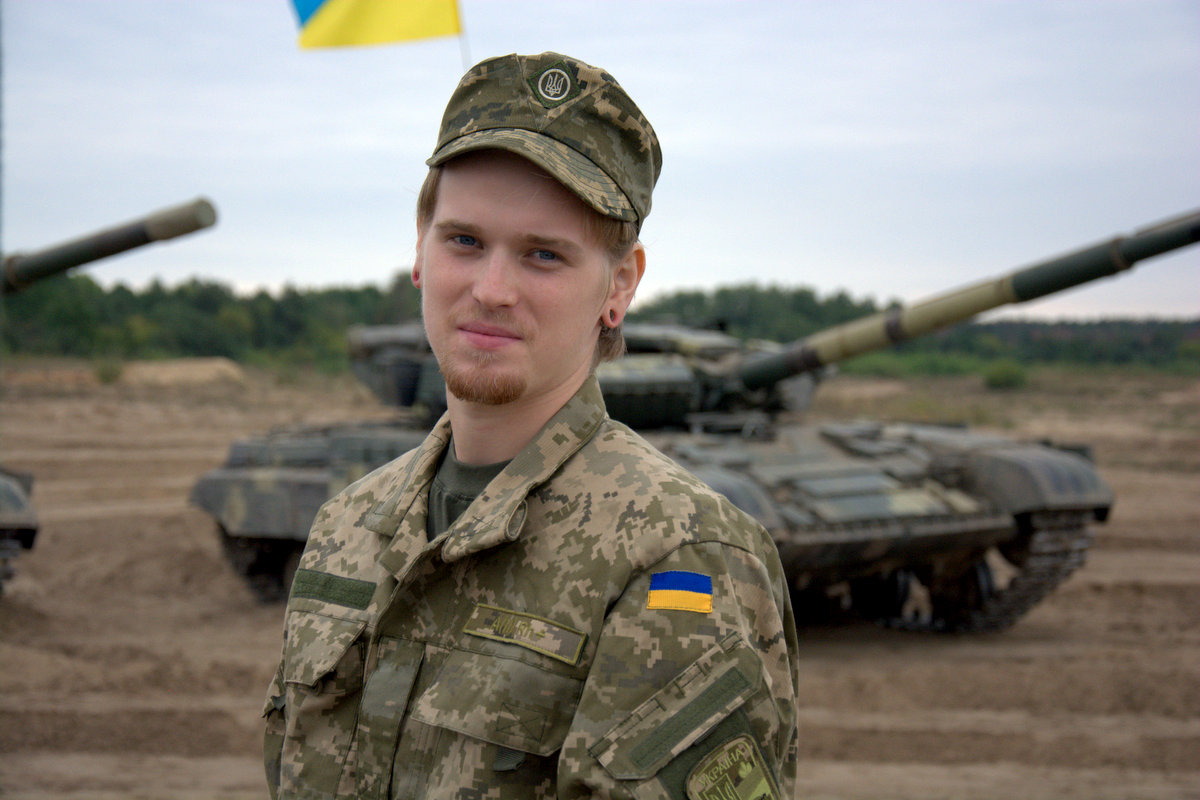
A soldier in standard camouflage dress

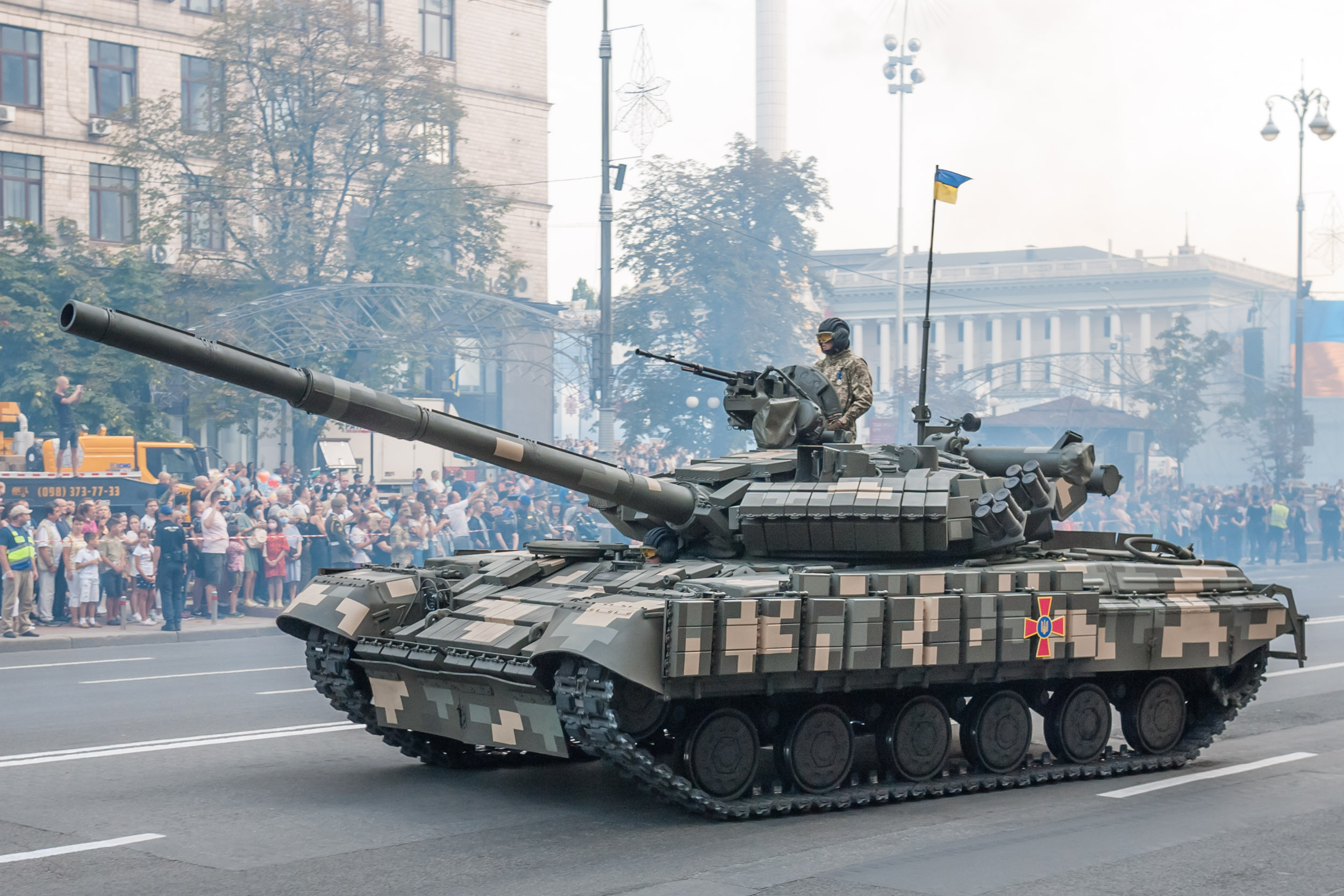
T-64 main battle tank

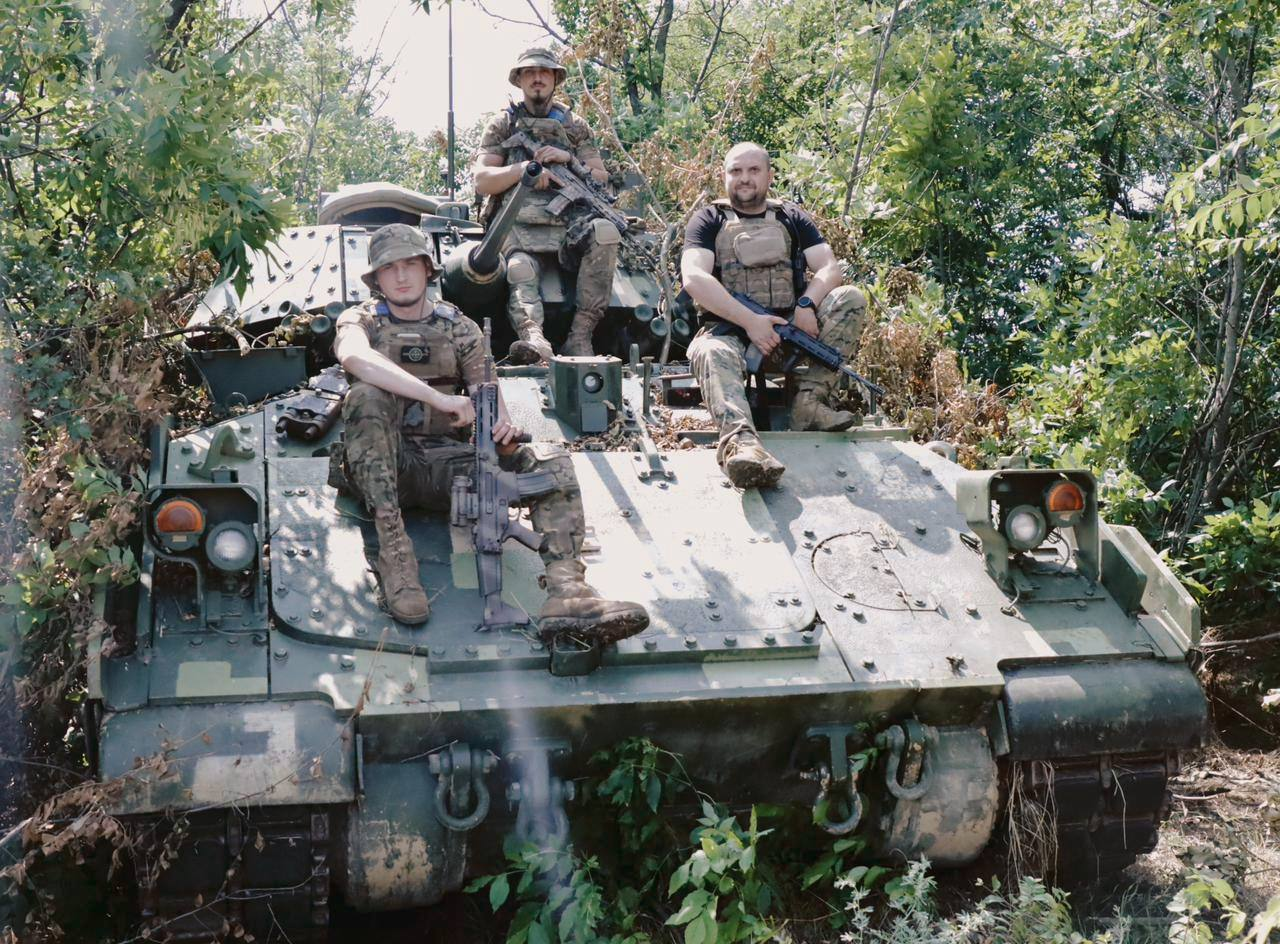
Bradley infantry fighting vehicle

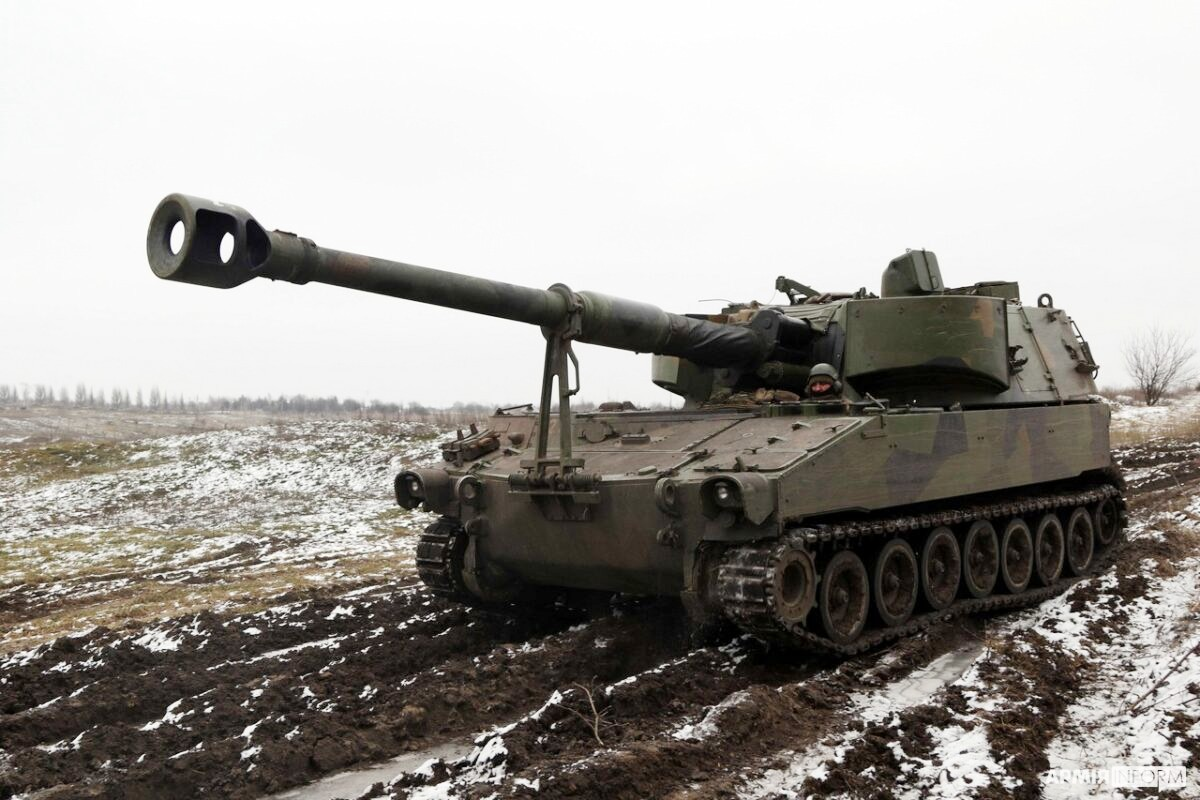
M109 self-propelled artillery

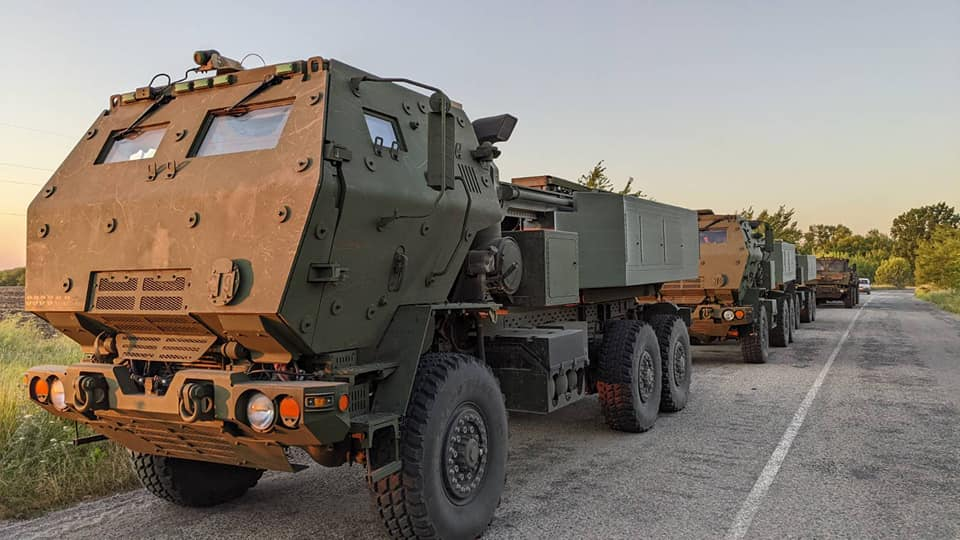
HIMARS rocket artillery

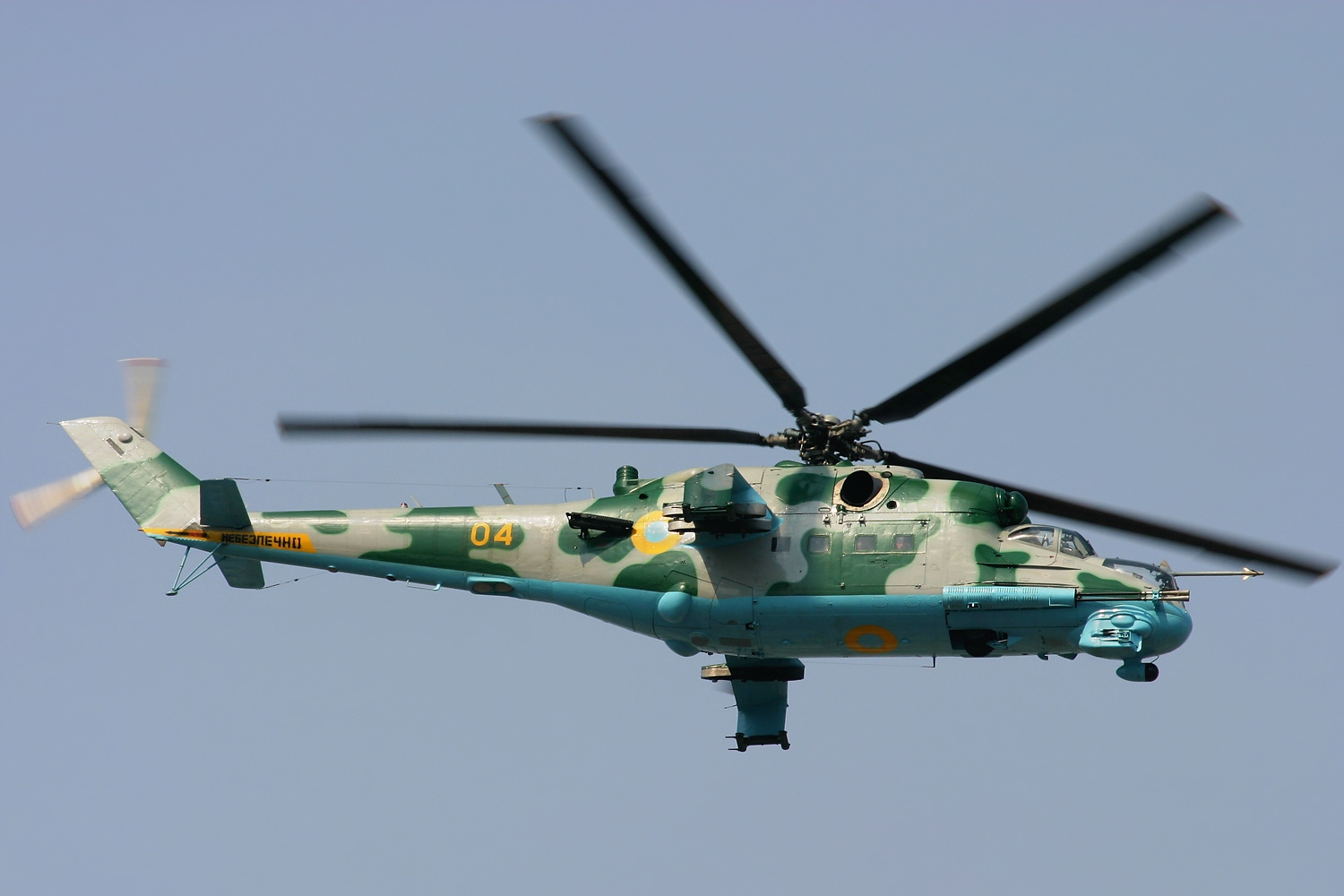
Mi-24 attack helicopter

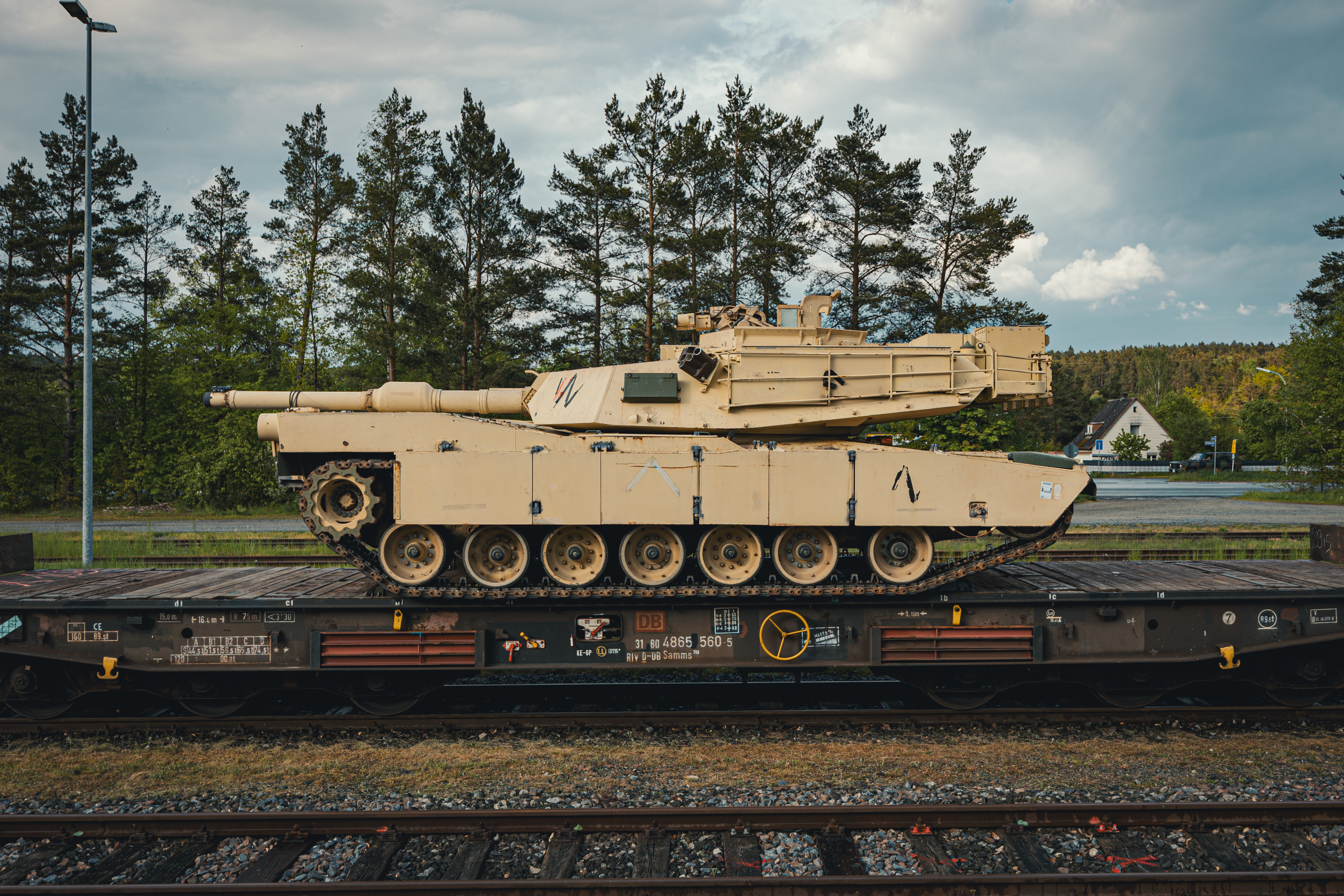
M1 Abrams tank

== Deployment outside of Ukraine ==
=== Bosnia-Herzegovina ===
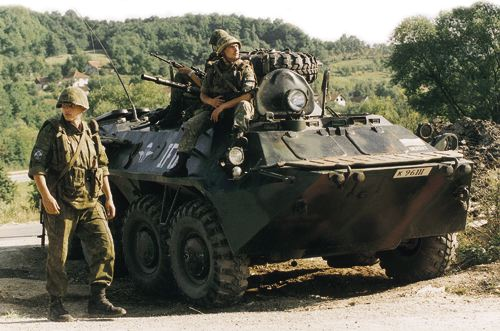
Ukrainian IFOR peacekeepers at a checkpoint outside Sarajevo, 1996

On 15 July 1992, Ukrainian peacekeepers formed into the 240th battallion arrived in Bosnia, at the time engulfed by a civil war. In what became the first peacekeeping mission in the history of independent Ukraine, the soldiers were initially based in Sarajevo. Since 1993 Ukrainian soldiers were deployed in Goražde and Žepa, which functioned as enclaves inside of the Bosnian Serb-held territory. In May 1995 Bosnian Serbs troops attacked two Ukrainian checkpoints in Sarajevo, attempting to get control over the peacekeepers' weapons and taking several Ukrainians hostage. The captured peacekeepers were later released and moved to Zagreb.

Another group of Ukrainian peacekeepers, which was based in Žepa, suffered from a blockade by Serb forces. Following the fall of nearby Srebrenica, a number of survivors of the massacre perpetrated by the Serbs managed to reach the Ukrainian positions. Following negotiations, Serb forces agreed to allow the evacuation of civilians from Žepa under protection of Ukrainian peacekeepers. As a result, between 5 and 10 thousand people, both civilians and members of the Bosnian Muslim army, could escape the village, with 36 soldiers being captured by the Serbs and 116 civilians murdered.

European Union envoy Carl Bildt and British Army general Rupert Smith positively evaluated the actions of Ukrainian peacekeepers during the evacuation of Žepa. Following the operation, Ukrainian defence minister Valeriy Shmarov received an award from the country's president Leonid Kuchma. However, the peacekeepers themselves received no awards, officially due to "disciplinary grounds", but possibly because of pressure from Russia, whose authorities were sympathetic to the Serb side of the conflict and didn't want information on the events in Žepa to reach publicity.

=== Kosovo ===
Ukrainian forces have also been deployed to Kosovo since 2000 as part of the 600 man Polish–Ukrainian Peace Force Battalion. In August 2014, Ukraine ended its mission to Kosovo due to the 2014 Russian invasion of Ukraine.

=== Afghanistan ===
Between 2001 and 2021, Ukraine allowed US military cargo planes to fly over and refuel on Ukrainian soil on their way to Afghanistan. In 2007 Ukraine deployed a detachment of the 143rd De-Mining Centre of the Armed Forces of Ukraine to Afghanistan. Ukraine had kept a team of soldiers deployed to Afghanistan as part of the ISAF from 2007 to 2021, which mostly consisted of pilots, medical officers, and bomb disposal experts.

Ukrainian pilots were responsible for training pilots of the Afghan Air Force on the operation of several aircraft as Afghan forces consisted of mostly Soviet designed aircraft such as the Mi-17, which Ukrainian troops were very familiar with. In 2013, the contingent of troops in Afghanistan totaled 26 troops. In 2014 the Ukrainian contingent was further drawn down and the team included 8 bomb disposal experts and several medical officers.

=== Iraq ===
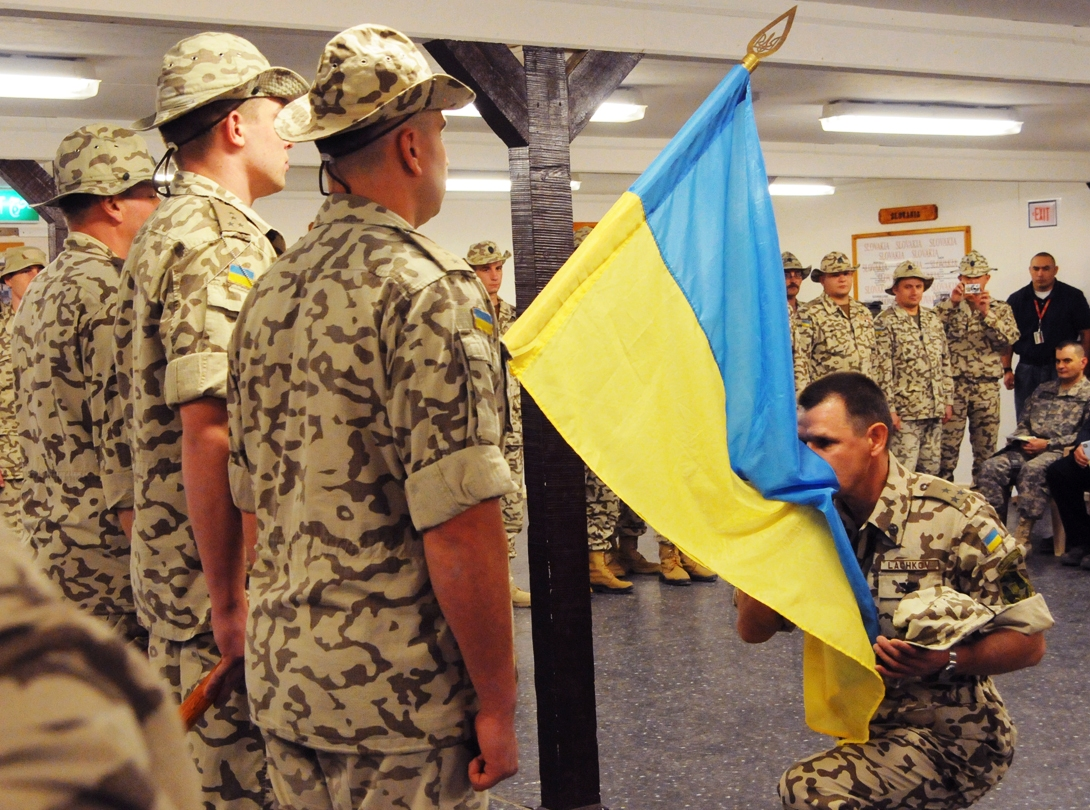
Henadii Lachkov, commander of the Ukrainian contingent in Iraq, kissing his country's flag

Ukraine deployed a sizable contingent of troops to Iraq as part of the Iraq War, which were stationed near Kut. Ukraine's troop deployment was the second largest of all those from former Soviet states besides Georgia and Ukraine deployed more soldiers to Iraq than many other NATO members such as Estonia, Latvia, and Lithuania. Ukraine also suffered the fifth highest casualty toll during the war, with only Polish, Italian, British, and US forces suffering heavier losses.

From 2003 to 2005 over 1,700 Ukrainian soldiers were deployed to Iraq, making up the third-largest contingent at the time. They were designated as the 5th Mechanised Brigade. Much as in Ukraine's mission to Kosovo, the troops deployed were contract soldiers and not conscripts. Ukraine began to severely draw down its troop levels in Iraq in 2005 due to mounting casualties and the political toxicity of the conflict. By 2005 only 876 soldiers, or roughly half of the original contingent were deployed, and by year's end troop levels dropped to below 100. In 2008, one year before the official end of the US military mission, President Viktor Yushchenko ordered all remaining troops in Iraq to return home, marking an official end of Ukraine's mission.

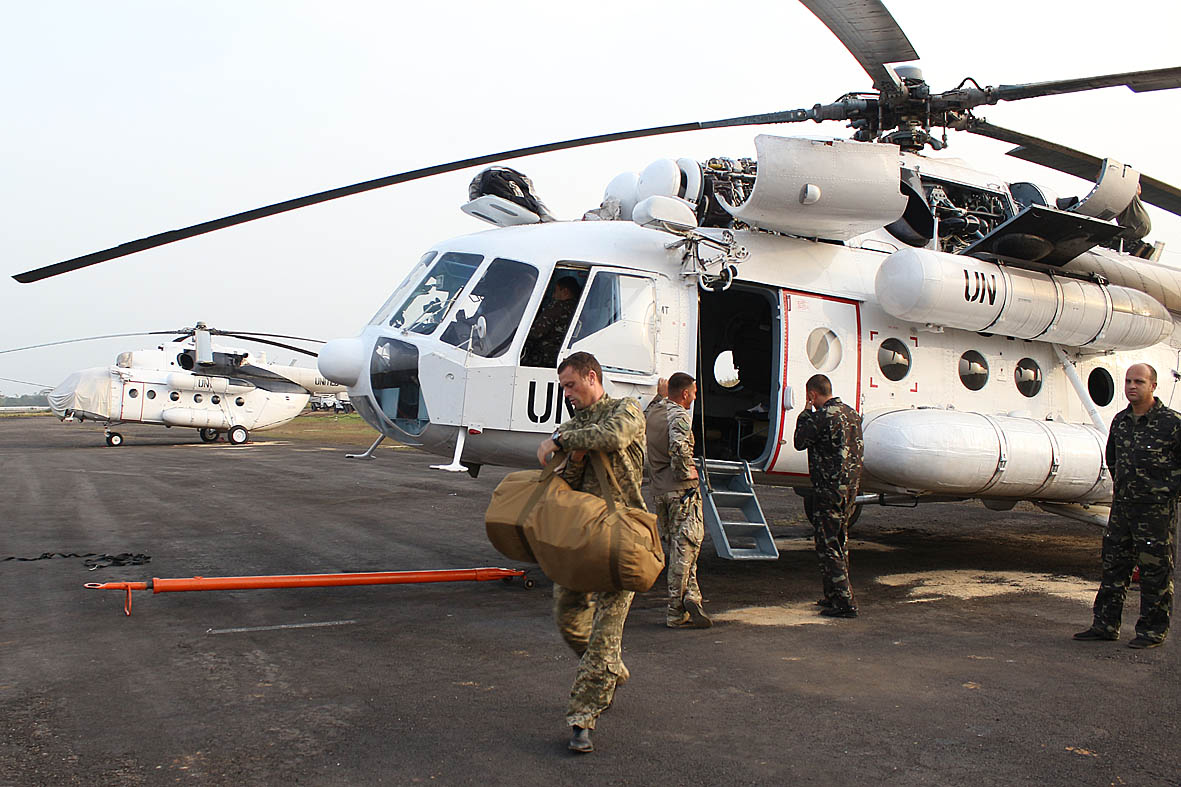
Ukrainian Mi-8 helicopters of the United Nations Mission in Liberia (UNMIL)

=== Africa ===
Ukrainian peacekeeping forces have been deployed to the Democratic Republic of the Congo, Liberia, Sudan and South Sudan, and Côte d'Ivoire. Ukrainian forces have also been requested to take a more active role in the Northern Mali Conflict of 2012 in battling Islamic militants. One of the largest deployments is the 18th Separate Helicopter Unit of the Ukrainian Armed Forces which consisted of 160 servicemen and four Mi-24P helicopters and was deployed to the DRC in 2011.

== Military decorations ==
Hero of Ukraine

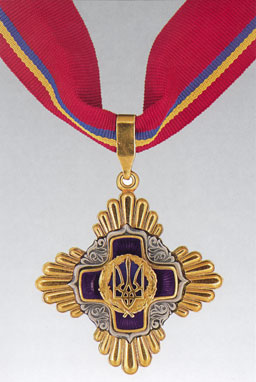
Order of Merit

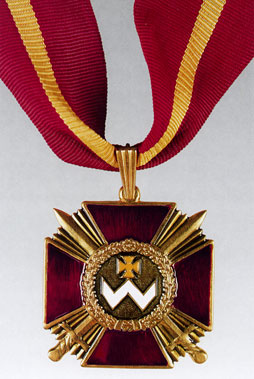
Order of Bohdan Khmelnytsky

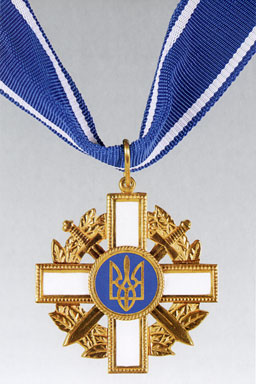
Order for Courage

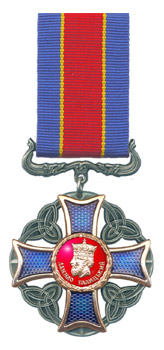
Order of Danylo Halytsky

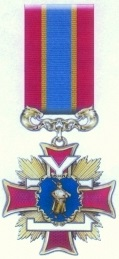
Cross of Ivan Mazepa

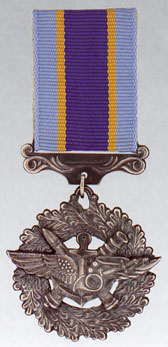
Medal For Military Service to Ukraine

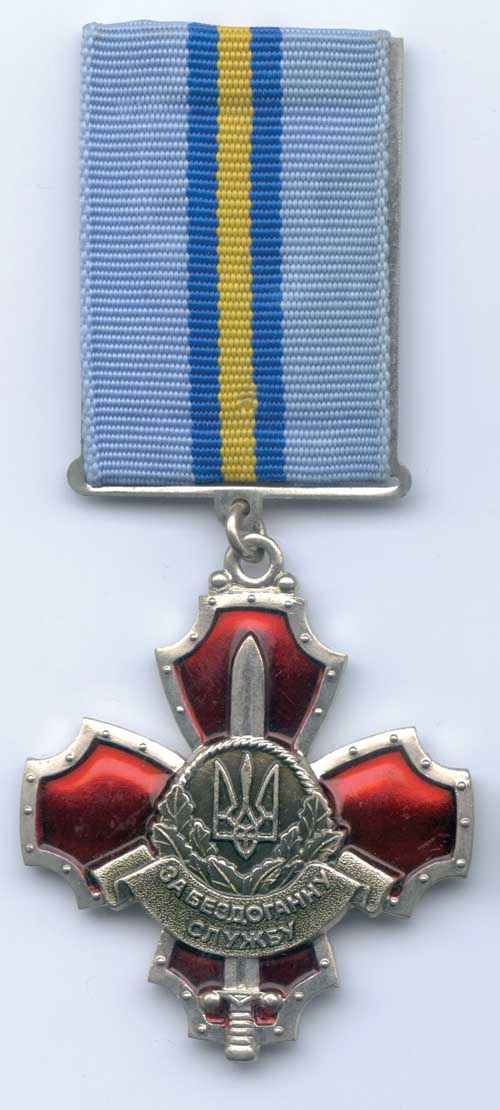
Medal "For Irreproachable Service"

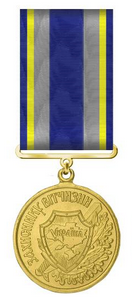
Defender of the Motherland Medal

== Veterans ==
Ukraine provides combat veterans with various benefits. Ukrainians who have served in World War II, the Soviet–Afghan War, or as liquidators at the Chernobyl disaster are eligible for benefits such as a monthly allowance, a discount on medical and pharmacy services, free use of public transportation, additional vacation days from work, having priority for retention in case of work layoffs, easier loan access and approval process, preference when applying for security related positions, priority when applying to vocation school or trade school, and electricity, gas, and housing subsidies. Veterans are also eligible to stay at military sanatoriums, provided there is available space.

Since gaining independence, Ukraine has deployed troops to conflicts in Kosovo, Iraq, and Afghanistan, which has created a new generation of veterans separate from those who served in the Soviet forces. Most recently the government passed a law extending veteran benefits to Ukrainian troops participating in the war in Donbas. Veterans from other nations who move to or reside in Ukraine may be eligible for some of the listed benefits. This provision was likely made to ensure that World War II, Chernobyl, and Afghanistan veterans from other Soviet states who moved to Ukraine received similar benefits. As Ukraine has participated in numerous NATO-led conflicts since its independence, it is unclear if NATO veterans would be extended these benefits.

Veteran groups are not as developed as in the United States, which has numerous well known national organisations such as the Veterans of Foreign Wars. World War II veterans, and even persons who have lived through the war are generally treated with the highest respect. Other veterans are not as well known. Ukrainian veterans from the Soviet war in Afghanistan are strikingly similar to the Vietnam veterans of the United States, although the Soviet Union generally kept the public in the dark throughout the war, unlike in Vietnam, where coverage was very high. Afghanistan is often labeled as a mistake by the Soviet Union and its successor states, but the lack of media coverage, and the censorship through the war have ensured that many still remain unaware of their nation's involvement in the conflict. Despite Ukraine having had the 3rd largest contingent of troops in Iraq in 2004, few Ukrainians realize today that their nation also is home to many veterans of the Iraq War. Soldiers who took part in the war in Donbas can receive free land plots. On 22 November 2018, the Ministry for Veterans Affairs was officially established.

== See also ==
- KMDB
- Malyshev Factory
- Military ranks of Ukraine
- Ukrspetsexport
