= Commander of the Ukrainian Ground Forces =

Ukrainian military position

- Командувач Сухопутних військ ЗС України
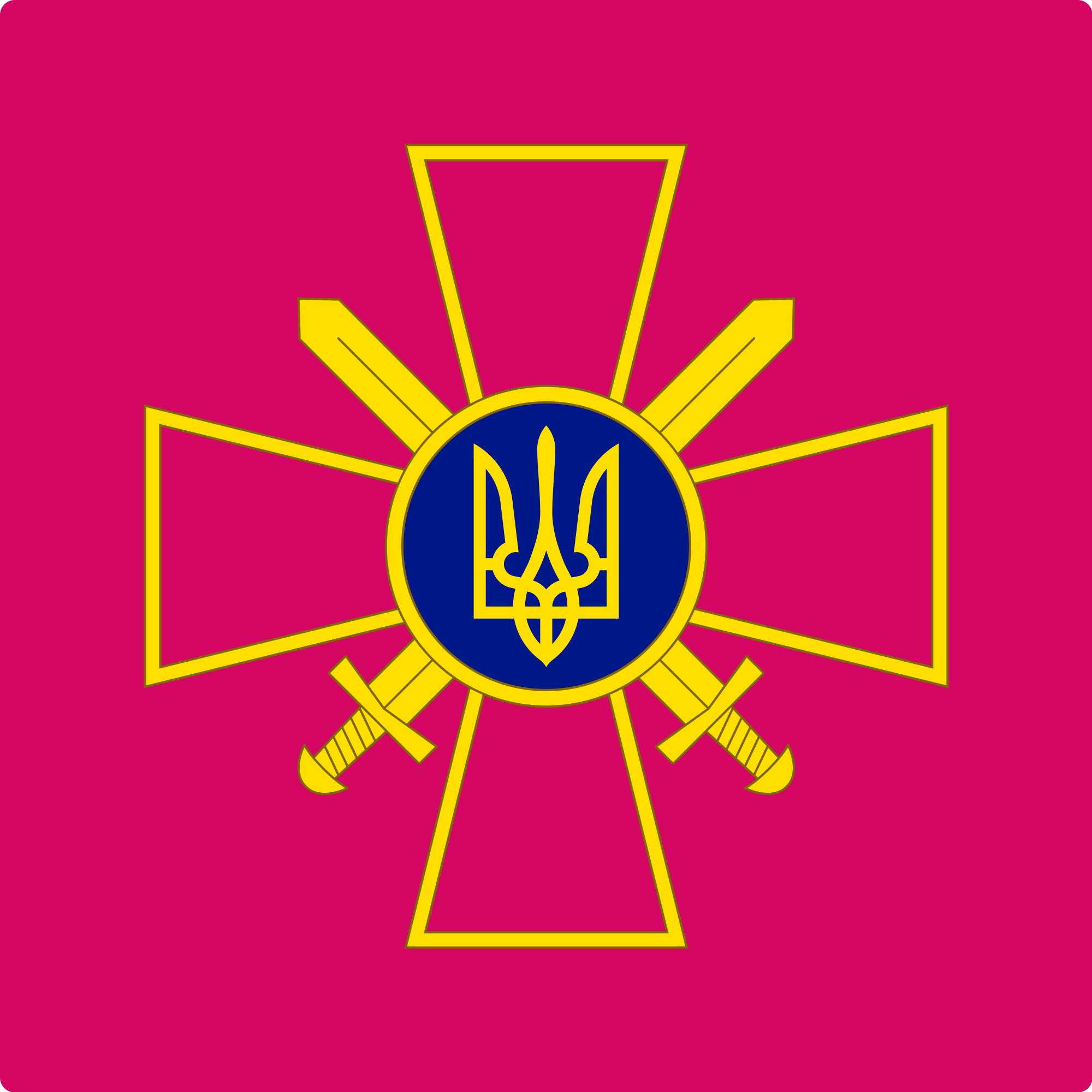
- Ensign of the Commander

- Incumbent; Svyatoslav Zaits since 2 September 2026
- Ukrainian Ground Forces
- Abbreviation: CGF ZSU
- Member of: General Staff of the Ukrainian Armed Forces
- Reports to: Commander-in-Chief of the Armed Forces
- Residence: Kyiv
- Appointer: The president
- Formation: 7 April 1994
- First holder: Vasyl Sobkov

The commander of the Ukrainian Ground Forces (Ukrainian: Командувач Сухопутних військ) is the professional head of the Ukrainian Ground Forces. In 2001–2005 it was known as commander-in-chief (Ukrainian: Головнокомандувач Сухопутних військ).

While the chief of ground forces post had been created in early 1992, it was over two years before the first holder, Colonel General Vasyl Sobkov, was appointed on 7 April 1994.

== List of commanders ==
No.	Portrait	Name (Birth–Death)	Term of office			Ref.
No.	Portrait	Name (Birth–Death)	Took office	Left office	Time in office	Ref.
Commander (Командувач Сухопутних військ)
1	Vasyl Sobkov	Colonel General; Vasyl Sobkov (1944–2020)	7 April 1994	30 September 1998	4 years, 5 months	.
2	Petro Shulyak	Colonel General; Petro Shulyak (born 1945)	30 September 1998	20 August 2001	2 years, 10 months	.
Commander-in-Chief (Головнокомандувач Сухопутних військ)
(2)	Petro Shulyak	Colonel General; Petro Shulyak (born 1945)	20 August 2001	27 November 2001	3 months	.
–	Mykola Palchuk [uk]	Lieutenant General; Mykola Palchuk (1945–2016); Acting	27 November 2001	19 December 2001	22 days	.
3	Oleksandr Zatynaiko	Colonel General; Oleksandr Zatynaiko (born 1949)	19 December 2001	13 August 2002	7 months	.
–	Mykola Palchuk [uk]	Lieutenant General; Mykola Palchuk (1945–2016); Acting	13 August 2002	October 2003	1 year, 2 months	.
–	Valeriy Frolov [uk]	Lieutenant General; Valeriy Frolov (born 1949); Acting	November 2003	19 July 2004	8 months	.
4	Mykola Petruk	Colonel General; Mykola Petruk (born 1950)	19 July 2004	16 June 2005	10 months	.
Commander (Командувач Сухопутних військ)
(4)	Mykola Petruk	Colonel General; Mykola Petruk (born 1950)	16 June 2005	6 May 2006	10 months	.
5	Valeriy Frolov [uk]	Lieutenant General; Valeriy Frolov (born 1949)	26 May 2006	28 June 2007	1 year, 1 month	.
6	Ivan Svyda	Colonel General; Ivan Svyda (born 1950)	25 June 2007	18 November 2009	2 years, 4 months	.
7	Henadii Vorobiov	Colonel General; Henadii Vorobiov (1961–2017)	18 November 2009	17 January 2014	4 years, 1 month	.
–	?	? Acting	17 January 2014	6 April 2014	2 months	.
–	Anatoliy Pushnyakov	Lieutenant General; Anatoliy Pushnyakov (1954–2021); Acting	6 April 2014	6 May 2014	1 month	
8	Anatoliy Pushnyakov	Lieutenant General; Anatoliy Pushnyakov (1954–2021)	6 May 2014	13 January 2016	1 year, 8 months	
–	Ruslan Khomchak	Lieutenant General; Ruslan Khomchak (born 1967); Acting	13 January 2016	28 March 2016	2 months	
9	Serhiy Popko	Colonel General; Serhiy Popko (born 1961)	28 March 2016	5 August 2019	3 years, 4 months	
10	Oleksandr Syrskyi	Colonel General; Oleksandr Syrskyi (born 1965)	5 August 2019	11 February 2024	4 years, 6 months	
11	Oleksandr Pavliuk	Lieutenant General; Oleksandr Pavliuk (born 1970)	11 February 2024	29 November 2024	9 months	
12	Mykhailo Drapatyi	Major General; Mykhailo Drapatyi (born 1982)	29 November 2024	1 June 2025	6 months	
13	Hennadii Shapovalov	Major General; Hennadii Shapovalov (born 1978)	19 June 2025	2 September 2026	1 year, 2 months	
14	Svyatoslav Zaits	Brigadier General; Svyatoslav Zaits	2 September 2026	Incumbent	2 months	

== See also ==
- Commander of the Navy (Ukraine)
- Commander of the Air Force (Ukraine)
- Commander of the Air Defence Forces (Ukraine)
- Commander of the Air Assault Forces (Ukraine)
- Commander of the Marine Corps (Ukraine)
