= Nikolai Pukhov =

Soviet Army colonel general (1895–1958)

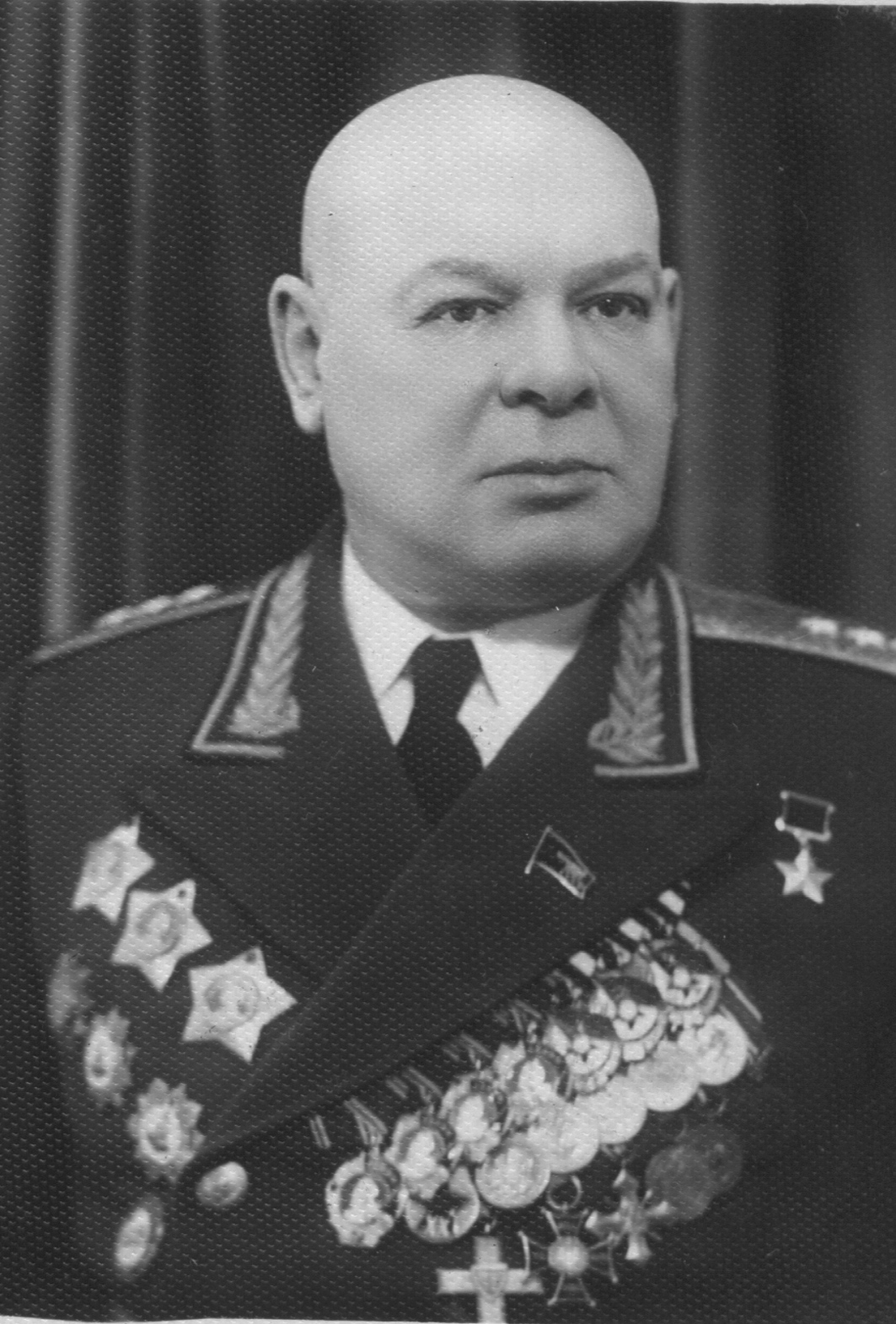
- Born: January 25, 1895; Grishovo village, Tyrnovskaya Volost, Peremyshlsky Uyezd, Kaluga Governorate, Russian Empire
- Died: March 28, 1958 (aged 63); Moscow, Soviet Union
- Burial place: Novodevichy Cemetery
- Military career
- Allegiance: Russian Empire (1916–1917); Soviet Union (1918–1958)
- Branch: Imperial Russian Army; Red Army (later the Soviet Army)
- Service years: 1916–1958
- Rank: Colonel general
- Commands: 304th Rifle Division; 13th Army; 8th Tank Army; Odessa Military District; Western Siberian Military District; Siberian Military District
- Conflicts: World War I; Russian Civil War; Polish–Soviet War; World War II
- Awards: Hero of the Soviet Union; Order of Lenin (4); Order of the Red Banner (3); Order of Suvorov, 1st class (3); Order of Kutuzov, 1st class (2); Order of Bogdan Khmelnitsky, 1st class

Nikolay Pavlovich Pukhov (Russian: Никола́й Па́влович Пу́хов; 25 January [O.S. 13 January] 1895–March 28, 1958) was a Soviet Army colonel general and a Hero of the Soviet Union who commanded troops during World War II.

Pukhov fought in World War I as a junior officer, afterwards joining the Red Army and fighting in the Russian Civil War, rising to become chief of staff of a division. During the interwar period he served as an instructor at several military academies, and following the Operation Barbarossa, the German invasion of the Soviet Union, he was given command of the 304th Rifle Division. In January 1942 Pukhov was promoted to command the 13th Army, which he led for the rest of the war. He was awarded the title Hero of the Soviet Union for his leadership of the army during the Battle of the Dnieper in September and October 1943. Postwar, Pukhov commanded the 8th Tank Army and several military districts before becoming the head Soviet advisor to the Romanian People's Army, the last position he held before his death.

== Early life and World War I ==
Pukhov was born on January 25, 1895, in the village of Grishovo in Kaluga Governorate. The son of an official, he graduated from the Kaluga Theological Seminary in 1915. He enrolled in the Moscow University but did not attend it, working as a history and literature teacher at the higher primary school in the village of Plokhino in Zhizdrinsky Uyezd of Kaluga Governorate from October, before being mobilized for service in the Imperial Russian Army in April 1916. He was sent to the 2nd Peterhof School of Praporshchiks, receiving the rank of Praporshchik upon graduation in October. Pukhov became a junior officer in the 163rd Reserve Infantry Regiment, stationed in Chelyabinsk. He was sent into combat on the Northern Front in June 1917 as a junior officer in the 186th Infantry Division's 744th Keidan Infantry Regiment. He served as chief of horse reconnaissance and intelligence for about two months but was gassed in the Battle of Riga near Ikšķile in August. In January 1918, Pukhov was demobilized with the rank of Praporshchik.

== Russian Civil War ==
Pukhov joined the Red Guards in February 1918 at Liski as an adjutant in the headquarters for formation of Red Guard detachments, who conducted forced requisitioning in Voronezh Governorate and fought anti-Soviet forces. After the Red Guards were incorporated into the Red Army in May, he became the adjutant of the 2nd Voronezh Regiment (formed from the Red Guard detachments), fighting against the White Army led by Pyotr Krasnov in Voronezh Governorate in the areas of Pavlovsk and Bobrov. In early March 1919, Pukhov transferred to the 8th Army as chief of staff of its Kalach Group of Forces after the regiment was disbanded. In April, he became chief of staff of the 3rd Brigade of the 1st Special Division, formed from the group, and was appointed chief of staff of the Ryazan Infantry Division's 1st Brigade in October. The brigade was part of the screening force against White cavalry commander Konstantin Mamontov's raid into the rear of the Southern Front. In November, the brigade was sent to the 7th Army, where it became part of the 1st Consolidated Division of the Karelian Combat Sector (redesignated the 55th Rifle Division on 21 November), fighting the Finnish Whites on the Karelian Isthmus.

Between January and February 1920 the brigade was renamed the 164th Brigade and was a separate unit, part of the Pytalovo group of the 15th Army; it fought against Latvian troops in the Latvian War of Independence in the Pytalovo area. In March the brigade served with the 55th and 11th Rifle Divisions in battles against Polish troops around Polotsk. During the Polish–Soviet War, the brigade continued to fight in the Polotsk area with the Northern Group of the 4th and 15th Armies. During July and August, with the Cavalry Corps of the 4th and 3rd Armies, and subsequently the Grodno Group of Forces, the brigade launched attacks towards Vilno, Grodno, Łomża, Białystok, and Brest. After the defeat of the Red Army in September, the brigade was disbanded and Pukhov transferred to become chief of staff of the 61st and then the 63rd Brigades in the 3rd Army's 21st Rifle Division, which retreated from Grodno to Lida in heavy fighting. In January 1921, he was promoted to chief of staff of the division, covering the White Sea coast near Arkhangelsk. In April, the 21st was transferred to Siberia, where it eliminated Andrey Bakich and Alexander Kaygorodov's remnant White forces in the Altai Mountains.

== Interwar period ==
Prior to World War II, Pukhov had little command experience. After the end of the Russian Civil War, he became chief of staff of the West Siberian Military District's 35th Rifle Division in April 1923. Between January 1924 and 1929 Pukhov commanded the 12th Rifle Division's 34th Rifle Regiment in the Siberian Military District. In September 1925, he entered the Vystrel Officers Improvement Course, graduating in October 1926, and in March 1930 was transferred to become a Vystrel tactics instructor himself. Pukhov then transferred to the Red Army's new and growing mechanized forces, and became assistant chief of the 1st Department of the Red Army Auto-Armored Division in July 1932. He was sent to Officers Technical Improvement Academic Courses at the Military Academy of Motorization and Mechanization in March 1934 and graduated in January 1935, becoming senior head of the tactics department there following graduation. Pukhov was made a Colonel in December after the Red Army re-introduced regular military ranks.

In July 1936, Pukhov became assistant chief in charge of training at the Gorky Armored School, which moved to Kharkov in March 1938. At Kharkov, he became the head of the school. In April 1939, Pukhov transferred to become an instructor at the Red Army Military-Economic Academy, and was promoted to Kombrig in April 1940. He became a Major General on 4 June when the Red Army reintroduced generals' ranks. That year he received the academic title of assistant in the tactics department. In January 1941 Pukhov became chief of the Training Department of the Military Quartermaster Academy after it was renamed from the Military-Economic Academy.

== World War II ==
On August 28, 1941, more than two months after Operation Barbarossa, the German invasion of the Soviet Union began, Pukhov was ordered to replace the commander of the 38th Army's 304th Rifle Division; this was his first field command since the rifle regiment about 15 years earlier. At the beginning of September it was transferred to the Kozelshchyna area, where until September 17 it suffered heavy losses in heavy defensive fighting, retreating east to the area of Sanzhery, Reshetylivka, and Poltava. The 304th then fought in the Donbass Defensive Operation during October, then was withdrawn to the reserve in the Snezhny Kut area. Pukhov held this position until January 20, 1942, when he was given command of the 13th Army, which he held until mid-1946. Until the middle of 1942 the army, part of the Bryansk Front, held defensive positions on the line of Skorodnoye and Kolpny. The army fought in the Battle of Voronezh in mid-1942 and the Voronezh-Kastornensk offensive operation in early 1943. On 14 February, following the latter, Pukhov was promoted to Lieutenant General. During the Battle of Kursk in July, the army, holding positions on the northern face of the Kursk bulge, repulsed six days of German attacks in fierce fighting, preventing a German breakthrough and limiting the German advance to 10–12 kilometers. When the Soviet troops switched over to the attack after decisively defeating the German army, the 13th Army fought in Operation Kutuzov.

The army advanced into Ukraine in the Chernigov-Pripyat Offensive. By 26 August, the army had advanced over 300 kilometers in less than a month. On 9 September, the army crossed the Desna River in the area of Obolonnaya and Spasskoye, repulsing German counterattacks for six days before resuming the advance. Between 15 and 16 September, the army crossed the bend of the Desna in the Chernigov and Morovsk area. Expanding the bridgehead, the army captured Chernigov on 21 September. On 23 September, two corps from the army crossed the Dnieper and on 30 September the Pripyat River. On 16 October, Pukhov was awarded the title Hero of the Soviet Union and the Order of Lenin for his leadership in the offensive. Joining the Voronezh Front, which became the 1st Ukrainian Front on October 20, the army fought to recapture Right-bank Ukraine and southeastern Poland. During the Battle of Kiev, Zhitomir–Berdichev Offensive, Rovno–Lutsk Offensive, Proskurov–Chernovtsy Offensive, and the Lvov–Sandomierz Offensive from the end of 1943 to mid-1944, the army advanced more than 750 kilometers. On 26 August 1944, Pukhov was promoted to Colonel General. During the final stage of the war in 1945, the army fought in the Vistula–Oder Offensive, the Sandomierz–Silesian Offensive, the Lower Silesian Offensive, the Upper Silesian Offensive, the Berlin Offensive, and the Prague Offensive.

== Postwar ==
Postwar, Pukhov continued to command the 13th Army, and in June 1946 became the first commander of the 8th Mechanized Army in the Carpathian Military District. In February 1948, he was transferred to command the Odessa Military District. After graduating from Higher Academic Courses at the Military Academy of the General Staff in 1952, Voroshilov became commander of the North Caucasus Military District in April 1953 before being transferred to command the West Siberian Military District in November of that year. He continued to command the Siberian Military District when it was recreated after the merger of the East and West Siberian Military Districts on January 4, 1956. In June 1957, Pukhov became the chief Soviet advisor to the Romanian People's Army. He died in Moscow on March 28, 1958, and was buried at the Novodevichy Cemetery. His unfinished memoirs were posthumously published in 1959 by Voenizdat as "Годы испытаний" or Years of Trials in English.

== Legacy ==
Streets in Donetsk, Chernigov, and Kaluga were named for Pukhov. A memorial plaque dedicated to him was located in Kaluga. In June 2006, a monument to Pukhov was unveiled in Zhitomir, the former headquarters of the 8th Mechanized Army.

== Awards and honors ==
Pukhov was a deputy of the Supreme Soviet of the Soviet Union at its 3rd and 4th convocations. He was awarded the following awards and decorations:

- Hero of the Soviet Union (Gold Star No. 1799)
- Order of Lenin (4)
- Order of the Red Banner (3)
- Order of Suvorov, 1st class (3)
- Order of Kutuzov, 1st Class (2)
- Order of Bogdan Khmelnitsky, 1st class
- Virtuti Militari (Poland)
- Order of the Cross of Grunwald (Poland)
- Czechoslovak War Cross 1939–1945
- Order of the Republic (Tuvan People's Republic)
