= 8th Army Corps (Ukraine) =

Former military unit

8th Army Corps 8-й армійський корпус
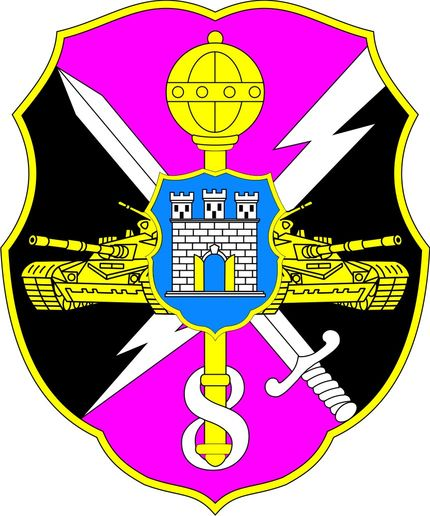
- Patch of the 8th Army Corps
- Active: 1 December 1993 – 15 March 2015
- Country: Ukraine
- Branch: Ukrainian Ground Forces
- Type: Corps
- Role: Rapid reaction
- Garrison/HQ: Chernihiv Oblast; Kyiv Oblast; Lviv Oblast; Zhytomyr Oblast
- Anniversaries: 6 June 1946
- Decorations: Order of the Red Star

Commanders
- Commanding officer: Lieutenant General Petro Lytvyn
- Second-in-command: Major General Victor Myzhenko

The 8th Army Corps (Ukrainian: 8-й армійський корпус, romanized: 8-y armiys'kyi korpus) was one of three army corps of the Ukrainian Ground Forces. The Corps was headquartered in Zhytomyr, Ukraine. In 2015 all army corps were dissolved, and their units were transferred under jurisdiction of the operation command.

On 1 December 1993, after the dissolution of the Soviet Union, the 8th Army Corps was formed by the redesignation of the 8th Tank Army. The 23rd Tank Division at Ovruch became the 6065th Base for Storage of Weapons and Equipment, and the 117th Training Tank Division later became the 119th District Training Centre. The 30th Tank Division became a Ukrainian mechanised brigade.

In March 2015, the 8th Army Corps was disbanded and its subordinate units transferred to other commands.

== Structure ==
8th Army Corps of the Ukrainian Ground Forces
Insignia	Name	Formation	Garrison
	1st Tank Brigade	Brigade	Honcharivske
	26th Artillery Brigade	Brigade	Berdychiv
	27th Reactive Artillery Brigade	Brigade	Sumy
	30th Mechanized Brigade	Brigade	Novohrad-Volynskyi
	72nd Mechanized Brigade	Brigade	Bila Tserkva
	1129th Anti-Aircraft Missile Regiment	Regiment	Bila Tserkva
	16th Army Aviation Brigade	Brigade	Brody
	20th Electronic Warfare Brigade	Brigade	Zhytomyr
	12th Engineer Regiment	Regiment	Novohrad-Volynskyi
	50th Repair and Recovery Battalion	Battalion	Huiva
	54th Radio Technical Battalion	Battalion	Zhytomyr
	93rd Signal Regiment	Regiment	Zhytomyr
	95th Airmobile Brigade	Brigade	Zhytomyr
	347th Information and Telecommunications Center	Center	Zhytomyr

== Commanders ==
Rank	Name	Position held	
Rank	Name	Start	End
Lieutenant General	Oleh Romanenko	June 1993	January 1997
Major General	Viacheslav Zabolotnyi	February 1997	May 2000
Lieutenant General	Hryhoriy Pedchenko	May 2000	December 2002
Major General	Anatoliy Pushniakov	December 2002	November 2004
Lieutenant General	Serhiy Ostrovskyi	November 2004	May 2010
Major General	Viktor Muzhenko	May 2010	May 2012
Lieutenant General	Petro Lytvyn	May 2012	March 2015
