= Alexey Komarov =

Russian wildlife artist

Alexey Nikanorovich Komarov (1 October 1879 – 31 March 1977) was a wildlife artist known for his paintings, sculpture and illustrations. He illustrated numerous works including books for children and scientific treatises. Komarov also made many propaganda posters for the USSR. He was awarded the titles of Honoured Art Worker of RSFSR (Russian Soviet Federal Socialist Republic) in 1947 and People's Artist of the RSFSR in 1972.

== Biography ==
Komarov was an illegitimate son of a landowner P.F. Rosetti and housekeeper D.K. Inshakova who was brought up by his aunts. He grew up in his father's estate in Skorodnoye, Tula.

After studies at the local school he went to the Moscow School of Painting, Sculpture and Architecture (MUZhVZ, 1897–1901) and studied under A. S. Stepanov, V. N. Baksheev, and N. A. Kasatkin. He travelled around Sweden and Norway in 1906 and learned of the work of Bruno Liljefors.

He lived at various times of his life in Tula, Kazan and Moscow and accompanied many scientific expeditions as an artist. He illustrated numerous books that included travel writings on N. M. Przhevalsky{ (1941), Birds in USSR (1951–1954) and Writings of naturalist (1964) by E. P. Spangenberg, Animals and birds of our country by V. N. Shnitnikov (1957), Mammals in USSR (1967–1972), and the Birds of Kazakhstan (1960–1970).

Komarov died in Moscow in 1977. His works are held in various museum collections including the State Darwin Museum of Natural History (Moscow), Kursk Regional Art Gallery, and the Moscow Regional Museum of Local History (Istra).
