= Petro Lytvyn =

Ukrainian commanding officer

- Петро Михайлович Литвин
- Born: Petro Mykhailovych Lytvyn; 12 June 1967 (age 59); Sloboda-Romanivska, Ukraine, Soviet Union
- Military career
- Allegiance: Soviet Union; Ukraine
- Branch: Ukrainian Ground Forces
- Rank: Lieutenant general
- Commands: Operational Command South (2007-2012)

Petro Mykhailovych Lytvyn (Ukrainian: Петро Михайлович Литвин; born 12 June 1967) is a Ukrainian commander and lieutenant general. He served as the commander of the 8th Army Corps from 2012 to 2015. He is the youngest brother of the Lytvyn family.

== Biography ==
In 1990 Lytvyn graduated the Kiev Armor-Engineer College. He served at the Soviet Far Eastern Military District and Carpathian Military District.

In 2001 Lytvyn graduated the Tactical operations faculty of National University of Defense of Ukraine. He served at the Ukrainian Northern and Western Operational Commands.

In June 2007, he became the commander of the Operational Command South.

In 2008 Lytvyn graduated the Strategic operations faculty of National University of Defense of Ukraine.

On August 25, 2012, in Novohrad-Volynskyi Petro Lytvyn attacked activists of "Vidsich" who were distributing leaflets in the "Revenge for division of Ukraine" campaign.

=== War in Donbas ===
During the War in Donbas, Lytvyn was placed in charge of the Sector D which was completely destroyed on August 24, 2014, and lead to the tragic events of Battle of Ilovaisk. According to witnesses, Lytvyn left his troops and fled the battlefield on 25 August.

=== Diplomatic work ===
Since June 19, 2018, he has served as the Ambassador Extraordinary and Plenipotentiary of Ukraine to the Republic of Armenia. He was dismissed from this position on July 19, 2019.

== Awards ==
- Order of Merit 2nd class (August 24, 2013)
- Order of Merit 3rd class (February 21, 2005)
- Defender of the Motherland Medal

Military offices
Preceded by Viktor Muzhenko	Commander of the 8th Army Corps; 2012–2015	Succeeded by Corps Disbanded
Preceded by Ivan Svyda	Commander of the OC South; 2007–2012	Succeeded by Ihor Fedorov as acting
