= Henadii Vorobiov =

Ukrainian general (1961–2017)

Hennadiy Vorobiov
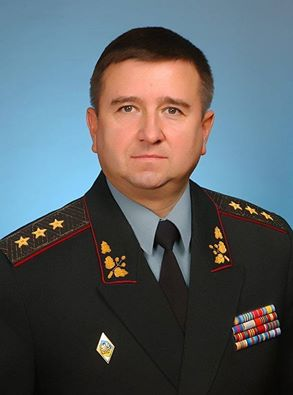
- Born: Henadii Petrovych Vorobiov; 25 June 1961; Akhalkalaki, Georgian SSR, Soviet Union
- Died: 11 February 2017 (aged 55); Kyiv, Ukraine
- Military career
- Allegiance: Soviet Union; Ukraine
- Branch: Ukrainian Ground Forces
- Service years: 1978–2017
- Rank: Colonel general
- Commands: Commander, Ukrainian Ground Forces
- Awards: Order of Bohdan Khmelnytsky (all classes); Order for Courage 3d class

Hennadiy Petrovych Vorobiov (Ukrainian: Геннадій Петрович Воробйов; 25 June 1961 – 11 February 2017) was a Ukrainian Colonel general and Commander of the Ground Forces of Ukraine from November 2009 to January 2014.

According to Mark Hertling, Vorobiov played an important role in the modernization of the Ukrainian ground forces, improving their performance in the Russo-Ukrainian War and 2022 Russian invasion of Ukraine.

== Career ==
Vorobiov began his officer serving as a commander of a motorized infantry platoon in the Trans-Baikal Military District. From 1984 to 1990, he served in the Soviet Army in different positions. In 1993 he graduated from the Frunze Military Academy. From 1993 to 2002 he served as Chief of Staff—Deputy Commander of the Motorized Rifle Regiment, Commander of the 17th Regiment of the 6th Mechanized Division of the National Guard of Ukraine, Commander of the 24th Mechanized Brigade, Commander of the 128th Mechanized Division of the Carpathian Military District and Western Operational Command troops of the Armed Forces of Ukraine.

From 2002 to 2003, he was Chief of Staff and First Deputy Commander of the 38th Army Corps of the Western Operational Command of the Ground Forces of the Armed Forces of Ukraine. In 2004, he graduated from the Faculty of Operational and Strategic Levels of the National Defense Academy of Ukraine. From 2004 to 2006, Commander of the 13th Army Corps of the Western Operational Command of the Ground Forces of the Armed Forces. From May 2006 to November 2009— First Deputy Chief of the General Staff of the Armed Forces of Ukraine. From November 18, 2009 to January 17, 2014— Commander of the Ground Forces of the Armed Forces of Ukraine.

In 2014, he was appointed First Deputy Chief of the General Staff of the Armed Forces of Ukraine. He defended his dissertation on "Creation and development of the Ground Forces of the Armed Forces of Ukraine (1991-2005)" and received the degree of Candidate of Historical Sciences. From September 12, 2014— the commander of the anti-terrorist operation troops during the investigation of General Muzhenko regarding the circumstances of the Battle of Ilovaisk.

He was released in 2014 under the Law of Ukraine "On Purification of Power" (lustration). On January 28, 2015, he was reinstated as the First Deputy Chief of the General Staff of the Armed Forces of Ukraine by the President of Ukraine in accordance with amendments to the law introduced by the Verkhovna Rada on January 27. From May 21 to August 29, 2016, he became the acting Head of the Ivan Chernyakhovsky National Defense University of Ukraine, serving on a permanent basis from August 30, 2016. Vorobiov died suddenly of a heart attack on February 11, 2017.

== Military ranks ==
- Lieutenant general (August 24, 2005);
- Colonel general (August 21, 2007)

== Awards ==
- Order of Bohdan Khmelnytsky 1st class (February 14, 2017).
- Order of Bohdan Khmelnytsky 2nd class (August 14, 2012).
- Order of Bohdan Khmelnytsky 3rd class (August 20, 2008).
- Order for Courage 3d class (August 20, 2001).
