= Serhiivka, Kodyma urban hromada, Podilsk Raion, Odesa Oblast =

Village in Odesa Oblast, Ukraine

Serhiivka Сергіївка
- Village
- Location in Ukraine Serhiivka (Ukraine)
- Coordinates: 47°59′58″N 29°04′29″E
- Country: Ukraine
- Oblast: Odesa Oblast
- Raion: Podilsk Raion
- Hromada: Kodyma urban hromada
- Founded: 1927

Area
  - Total: 1.15 km^{2} (0.44 sq mi)
- Elevation: 176 m (577 ft)

Population (2001)
  - Total: 253
  - Density: 220/km^{2} (570/sq mi)
- Time zone: UTC+2 (EET)
  - Summer (DST): UTC+3 (EEST)
- Postal code: 66032
- Area code: +380-4867

Serhiivka (Ukrainian: Сергіївка) (Note: The village was previously known as Kotovtsi (Ukrainian: Котівці) until 2016.) is a village located in the Podilsk Raion of Odesa Oblast (region) of central Ukraine, in the south-eastern part of the historic region of Podilia. It forms part of Kodyma urban hromada, one of the hromadas of Ukraine.

== History ==
Serhiivka was founded in 1927. During the Holodomor organized by the Soviet authorities from 1932 to 1933, at least 3 residents of the village died.

On 19 May 2016, Verkhovna Rada adopted the decision to rename Kotovtsi to Serhiivka to conform to the law prohibiting names of Communist origin.

Until 18 July 2020, Serhiivka was located in Kodyma Raion. The raion was abolished in July 2020 as part of the administrative reform of Ukraine, which reduced the number of raions of Odesa Oblast to seven. The area of Kodyma Raion was merged into Podilsk Raion.

== Demographics ==
According to the 1989 Soviet census, the population of the village was 300 people, of whom 120 were men and 180 women.

According to the 2001 Ukrainian census, 285 people lived in the village.

=== Languages ===
According to the 2001 census, the primary languages of the inhabitants of the village were:

Language	Percentage
Ukrainian	92.98 %
Russian	4.21 %
Armenian	1.75 %
Moldovan (Romanian)	1.05 %
