= Hrabove, Odesa Oblast =

Rural locality in Odesa Oblast, Ukraine

Hrabove Грабове
- Location in Ukraine
- Coordinates: 48.01939°N 29.03417°E
- Country: Ukraine
- Oblast: Odesa Oblast
- Raion: Podilsk Raion
- Hromada: Kodyma urban hromada
- Time zone: UTC+2 (EET)
  - Summer (DST): UTC+3 (EEST)

Hrabove (Ukrainian: Грабове) is a village in Podilsk Raion, Odesa Oblast, Ukraine, near the border between Ukraine and Moldova. It belongs to Kodyma urban hromada, one of the hromadas of Ukraine.

== History ==
Grabowa or Hrabowa, as it was known in Polish, was a private village of the Lubomirski family, administratively located in the Bracław County in the Bracław Voivodeship in the Lesser Poland Province of the Kingdom of Poland. Following the Second Partition of Poland, it was annexed by Russia. There were 157 houses in the village as of 1868.

In 1924, it became part of the Moldavian Autonomous Oblast, which was soon converted into the Moldavian Autonomous Soviet Socialist Republic, and the Moldavian Soviet Socialist Republic in 1940 during World War II. From 1941 to 1944, it was administered by Romania as part of the Transnistria Governorate.

Until 18 July 2020, Hrabove belonged to Kodyma Raion. The raion was abolished in July 2020 as part of the administrative reform of Ukraine, which reduced the number of raions of Odesa Oblast to seven. The area of Kodyma Raion was merged into Podilsk Raion.
