= Vasyl Sobkov =

- Василь Тимофійович Собков
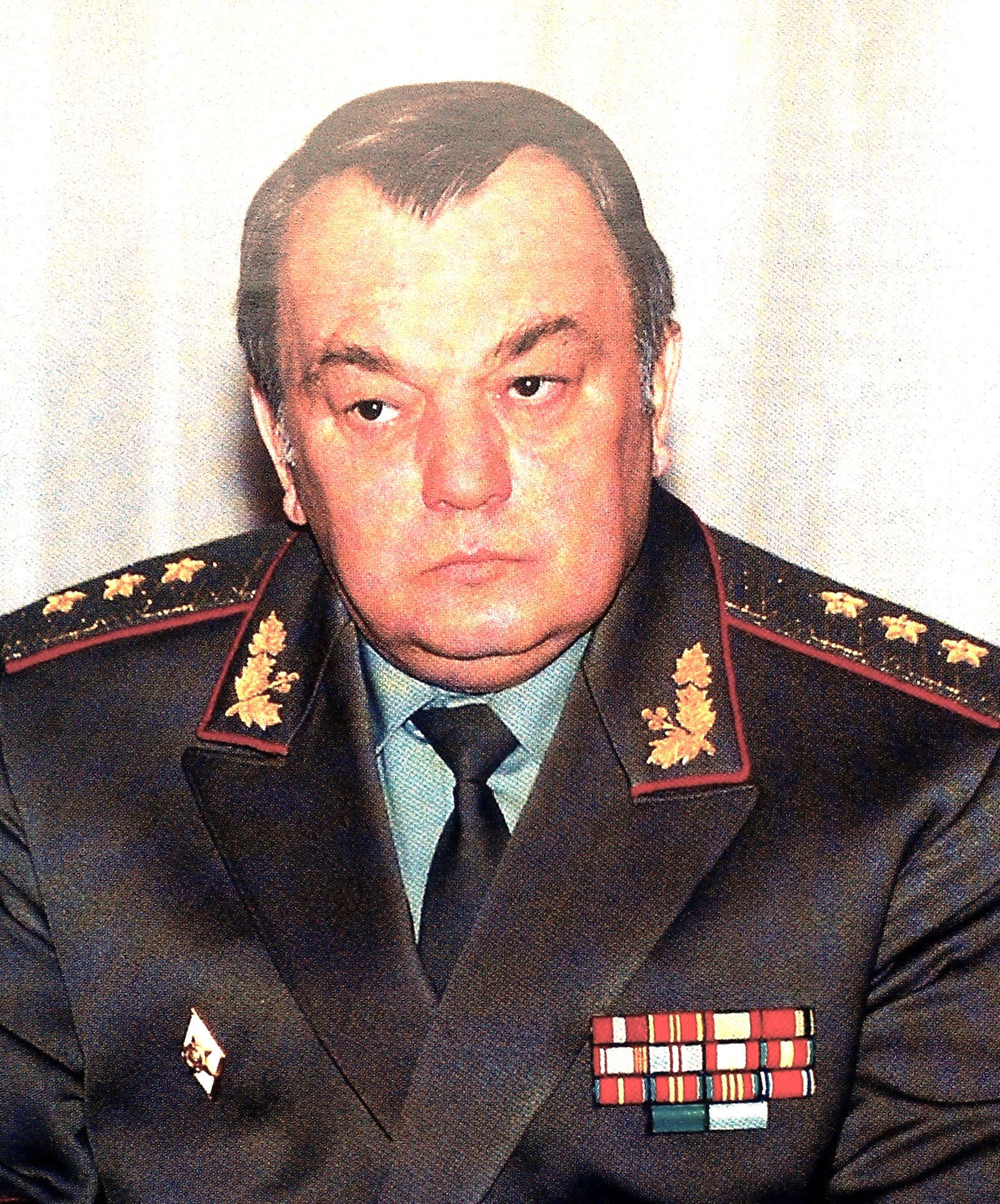
- Born: Vasyl Tymofiyovych Sobkov; 29 October 1944; Lysanitsi, Ukrainian SSR, Soviet Union
- Died: 1 April 2020 (aged 75); Kyiv, Ukraine
- Military career
- Allegiance: Soviet Union; Ukraine
- Branch: Ukrainian Ground Forces
- Rank: Colonel general
- Commands: Carpathian Military District (1992-1994)
- Conflicts: Soviet-Afghan War

Vasyl Tymofiyovych Sobkov (Ukrainian: Василь Тимофійович Собков; 20 October 1944 - 1 April 2020), was an officer of the Soviet and later Ukrainian Armed Forces, who had served as the Deputy Minister of Defense from 1994 to 1998.

Sobkov also served as the commander of the Carpathian Military District in post-independence Ukraine from 1992 to 1994. In 1992, Sobkov served as the Chief of the General Staff — First Deputy Minister of Defense of Ukraine.

== Biography ==
=== Soviet service ===
Vasyl Sobkov was born on 20 October 1944 to a family of peasants. After graduating from the Kazan Tank Command School in 1966, he served in the troops of the Carpathian Military District, where he held the positions of tank platoon commander, tank company, training platoon, and training company. After graduating in 1977 from the Military Academy of Armored Forces named after Marshal of the Soviet Union R. Ya. Malinovsky, he was sent for further service to the Group of Soviet Forces in Germany, where he held the positions of chief of staff - deputy commander, then commander of a tank regiment and deputy commander of a tank division. In 1984, he graduated from the K. E. Voroshilov Military Academy of the General Staff of the Armed Forces of the Soviet Union, and was appointed commander of a motor rifle division in the troops of the Transcaucasian Military District, then from 1987 to 1989, he was the commander of an army corps in the Turkestan Military District.

From 1989 to 1991 Sobkov served as commander of the 6th Guards Tank Army in the Kiev Military District, and in May 1991 he was commander of the 2nd Guards Tank Army, as part of the Western Group of Forces, reaching the rank of lieutenant general in the Soviet Armed Forces.

=== Ukrainian service ===
On 4 June 1992, Sobkov was appointed Chief of the General Staff - 1st Deputy Minister of Defense, but on 25 September of the same year he was transferred to the post of commander of the Carpathian Military District instead of Lieutenant General Valeriy Stepanov, who had led the district for only a few months. On 31 December, by Decree of the President of Ukraine, Sobkov was promoted to a colonel general. On 7 April 1994, he was appointed the first, after the creation of the position, Commander of the Ukrainian Ground Forces - Deputy Minister of Defense of Ukraine.

On 30 September 1998, after the resignation of Army General Valeriy Hubenko from the post of Inspector General of the General Military Inspectorate under the President of Ukraine, Sobkov was appointed to this post, and in the post of Commander of the Ground Forces he was replaced by Colonel General Petro Shulyak, who at one time replaced him and as commander of the Carpathian Military District. On 16 November 2004, by decree of the President of Ukraine, Leonid Kuchma, he was dismissed from military service due to his health.

Colonel General Vasyl Tomofiyovych Sobkov died on 1 April 2020 in Kyiv. He was buried on 3 April 2020, at the Baikove Cemetery.
