= Viktor Muzhenko =

Ukrainian general (born 1961)

- Віктор Миколайович Муженко
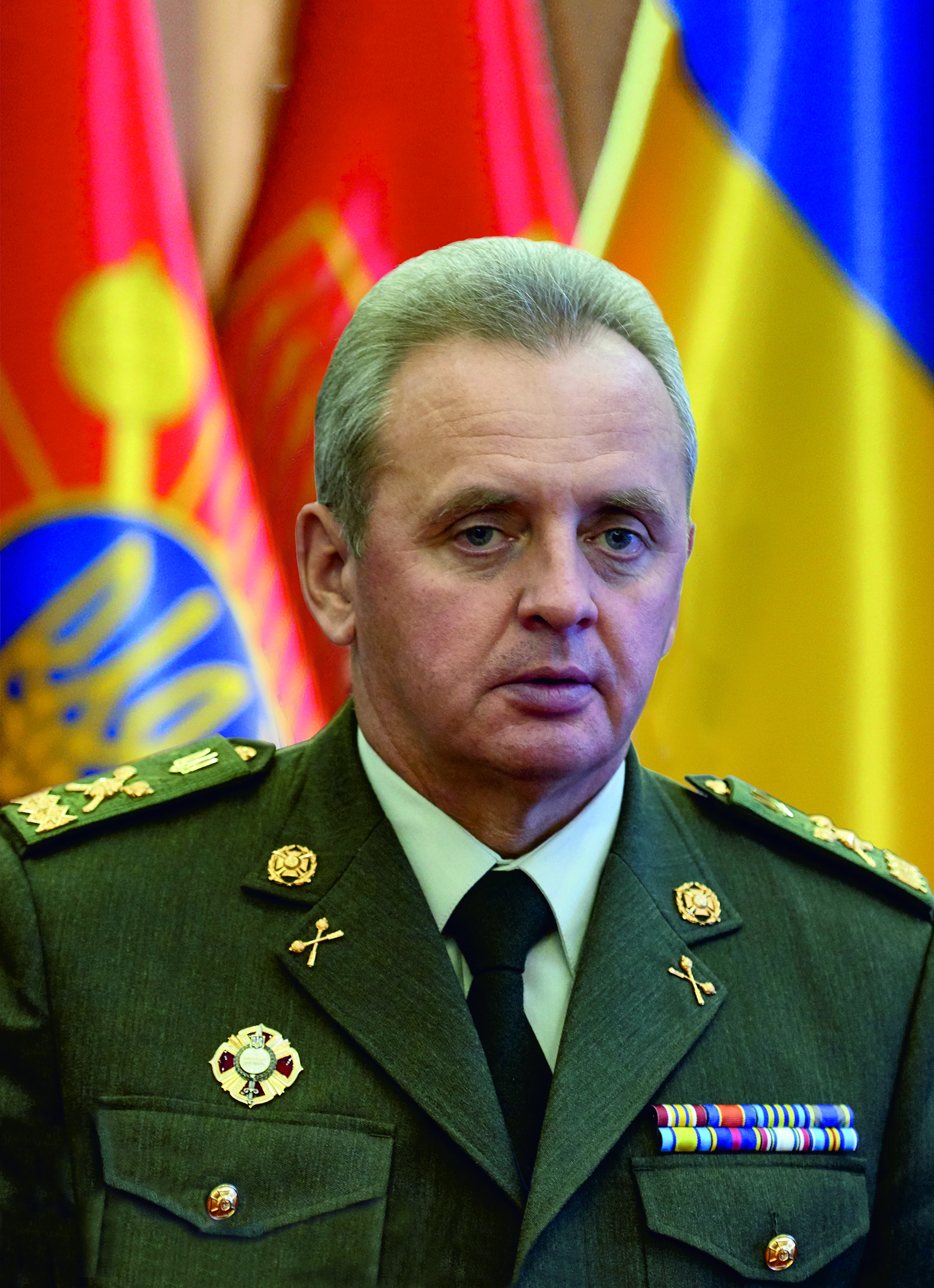
- Muzhenko in 2016
- Born: Viktor Mykolayovych Muzhenko; 10 October 1961 (age 65); Vystupovichi, Ovruch Raion, Zhytomyr Oblast, Ukrainian SSR, Soviet Union
- Military career
- Allegiance: Soviet Union (1983–1991); Ukraine (1992–2019)
- Branch: Soviet Army; Ukrainian Ground Forces
- Rank: General of the army of Ukraine
- Commands: Chief of the General Staff (2014–2019); Deputy Chief of the General Staff of the Armed Forces of Ukraine (2012–2014); 8th Army Corps (Ukraine) (2010–2012)

Viktor Mykolayovych Muzhenko (Ukrainian: Віктор Миколайович Муженко; born 10 October 1961) is a Ukrainian general who was the Chief of the General Staff and the commanding officer of the Armed Forces of Ukraine from 2014 to 2019.

== Biography ==
In 1983 Muzhenko graduated from the Leningrad Higher Military Command School. He then served in the Soviet Union's Transcaucasian Military District in the mechanized and motorized infantry, ending up being a commander of a motorized infantry battalion in Armenia. In 1992 he moved to the Carpathian Military District where he till 2000 served as its commander. In 1996 Muzhenko graduated from the Academy of the Armed Forces of Ukraine. From 2000 until 2003 he was chief of staff — deputy division commander of the Territorial Directorate "North". From April 2003 to July 2004 he served as chief of staff — first deputy commander of a mechanized brigade of Ukrainian peacekeeping contingent of the multinational force in Iraq. In 2005 Muzhenko graduated from the Faculty training of operational and strategic levels of the National Defence Academy of Ukraine. In 2005 he was appointed Deputy Chief of Staff of the Army Corps of Ukrainian Ground Forces, a post he held till 2010. In 2010–2012, he served as commander of the 8th Army Corps. On 10 May 2012 Muzhenko was appointed Deputy Chief of the General Staff of the Armed Forces of Ukraine. On 24 August 2012 Muzhenko was awarded the rank of lieutenant general. Muzhenko was elected deputy of the Zhytomyr Oblast Council for the Party of Regions, but left the party in February 2014. 20 May 2014 decree of the Acting President Oleksandr Turchynov appointed him first deputy head of the counterterrorist center at the Security Service of Ukraine.

Muzhenko was appointed Chief of the General Staff by president Petro Poroshenko on 3 July 2014. (According to Poroshenko) at the time his predecessor Mykhailo Kutsyn was suffering from shell-shock and a concussion and was staying at a hospital (he had been wounded while combating the 2014 insurgency in Donbas). Muzhenko had also entered into combat in the Donbas region during the same operation.

== Awards and decorations ==
- Order of Bohdan Khmelnytsky 3rd class (4 July 2016).
- Order of Danylo Halytsky (2004)
- Medal "For Irreproachable Service"
- Defender of the Motherland Medal
- Medal "For Impeccable Service"
- Jubilee Medal "70 Years of the Armed Forces of the USSR"
- Medal "For Distinction in Military Service"

Military offices
Preceded by Mykhailo Kutsyn	Chief of the General Staff; 2014–2019	Succeeded by Ruslan Khomchak
Preceded by Serhiy Ostrovsky	Commander of the 8th Army Corps; 2010–2012	Succeeded by Petro Lytvyn
