= Anatoliy Pushnyakov =

Ukrainian general (1954–2021)

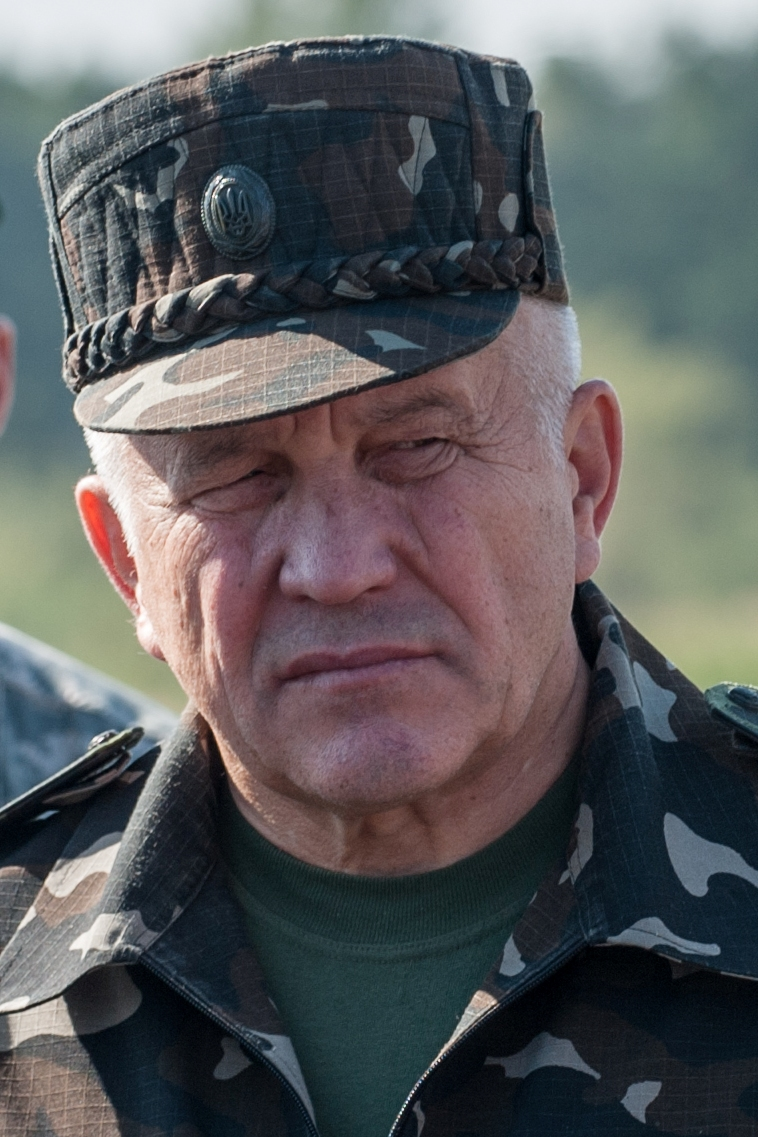
- Native name: Анатолій Савватійович Пушняков
- Born: 3 March 1954; Kodyma, Ukrainian SSR, Soviet Union
- Died: 17 November 2021 (aged 67)
- Allegiance: Soviet Union (to 1991); Ukraine
- Branch: Soviet Army; Ukrainian Ground Forces
- Service years: 1975–2016
- Rank: Lieutenant General
- Conflicts: Soviet–Afghan War; Iraq War; Russo-Ukrainian War; Crimean Crisis of 2014; War in Donbas

Anatoliy Savvatiyovych Pushnyakov (Ukrainian: Анатолій Савватійович Пушняков; 3 March 1954 – 17 November 2021) was a Ukrainian military officer of the rank of Lieutenant General. He served as the Deputy Commander of the Western Operational Command, commander of the Ukrainian peacekeeping contingent, at the same time the deputy commander of the multinational division "Center South" in Iraq. From 6 May 2014 to 13 January 2016, he served as Commander of the Ukrainian Ground Forces.

== Biography ==
He was born on 3 March 1954 in the village of Kodyma in Odesa Oblast. In 1975, he graduated from the Kharkiv Guards Higher Tank Command School, the Military Academy of Armored Forces named after R. Malinovskyi (1987), and the National Defense Academy of Ukraine (2000).

He served in the positions of tank platoon commander and tank company commander of a motorized rifle regiment, chief of staff - deputy tank battalion commander. He was sent to Afghanistan for further service. After graduating from the Military Academy of Armored Forces, he continued his service as a tank battalion commander, chief of staff — deputy commander of a tank regiment, commander of a tank regiment, chief of staff — deputy commander of a mechanized division, and division commander.

After graduating from the National Defense Academy of Ukraine, he held the position of Chief of Staff - First Deputy Corps Commander of the Southern Operational Command, and since 2002 - Commander of the 32nd Army Corps. In 2004, he became the first deputy commander of the Western Operational Command.

From 3 July 2005 to December 2005, he served as commander of the Ukrainian peacekeeping contingent in Iraq, simultaneously as deputy commander of the multinational division "Center South". Since March 2006 to May 2007 — chief of the Main Personnel Department — deputy chief of the General Staff of the Armed Forces of Ukraine.

From 2007 to 2009 — Deputy Commander of the Ground Forces of the Armed Forces of Ukraine for combat training — head of the combat training department.

Since 2009, he has been the first deputy commander of the Ukrainian Ground Forces.

Since 6 May 2014, Commander of the Ukrainian Ground Forces.

Pushnyakov resigned, and his report was approved by the Minister of Defense of Ukraine, Stepan Poltorak. On 13 January 2016, the President of Ukraine, Petro Poroshenko dismissed Anatoliy Pushnyakov from the post of commander of the Ukrainian Ground Forces. (Decree No. 4 dated 13 January 2016).

Pushnyakov died on 17 November 2021. He is buried at Baikove Cemetery (plot No. 33).

== Awards and honors ==
- Order of the Red Star
- Full Knight of the Order of Bohdan Khmelnytsky (Order of the I Degree – 2015, II Degree – 2013, III Degree – 2005)
- Medal For Military Service to Ukraine (30 September 1997)
- Honors of the Ministry of Defense of Ukraine "Named firearm," "Valor and Honor," "Badge of Honor"

== Sources ==
- Помер колишній командувач Сухопутних військ ЗСУ генерал Анатолій Пушняков // Укрінформ, 17.11.2021
