= Mykola Petruk =

Ukrainian politician

- Микола Петрук
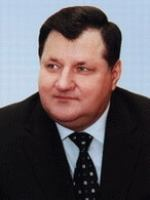

Member of the Verkhovna Rada
- In office 23 November 2007 – 12 December 2012
- In office 27 May 2006 – 12 June 2007

Personal details
- Born: Mykola Mykolayovych Petruk; 1 February 1950 (age 76) Karpivtsi, Ukrainian SSR, Soviet Union
- Party: Independent
- Other political affiliations: Yulia Tymoshenko Bloc

Military service
- Branch/service: Soviet Army (1971-1991); Ukrainian Ground Forces (1991-2008)
- Years of service: 1971–2008
- Rank: Colonel General

Mykola Mykolaiovych Petruk (Ukrainian: Микола Миколайович Петрук; born 1 February 1950) is a Ukrainian politician and former army officer who served as a member of the Vekhovna Rada from 2006 to 2012.

He also served as the Commander of the Ukrainian Ground Forces from 2004 to 2006. He is last ranked as a colonel general as of December 2003.

== Biography ==
Mykola Petruk was born on 1 February 1950, into a working-class family.

He graduated from the Baku Higher Military Command School in 1971. In the same year, he became the commander of the motorized rifle platoon of the Carpathian Military District. Between 1973 and 1991, he held various ranks as the deputy commander of a motorized rifle company from the technical unit, commander of a motorized rifle company, chief of staff of a motorized rifle battalion, commander of a motorized rifle battalion, deputy commander of a motorized rifle regiment, commander of a motorized rifle regiment, chief of staff of a motorized rifle division, and was the commander of a separate motorized rifle brigade in Cuba. He graduated from the Frunze Military Academy in 1983.

In August 1993, after graduating from Military Academy of the General Staff of the Armed Forces of the Russia, he became the Commander of the 24th Mechanized Division, Commander of the 13th Army Corps, First Deputy Commander of the Western Operational Command of the Ground Forces, First Deputy Commander-in-Chief of the Ground Forces of the Armed Forces of Ukraine.

On 16 October 2003, Petruk was appointed Commander of the Operational Command West.

On 19 July 2004, President Leonid Kuchma appointed Petruk to the Commander-in-Chief of the Ground Forces of the Armed Forces of Ukraine.

On 16 June 2005, Petruk was appointed commander of the Ground Forces of the Armed Forces of Ukraine.

== Political career ==
In the parliamentary elections of 2006 and 2007, he was listed No. 9 on the list of the Yulia Tymoshenko Bloc, people's deputy of Ukraine of the V and VI convocations of the Verkhovna Rada of Ukraine. Both times he was a member of the Committee on National Security and Defense, and was elected as an independent.

== Family ==
He is married, and has two daughters.
