= Kodyma =

City in Odesa Oblast, Ukraine

Kodyma Кодима
- City
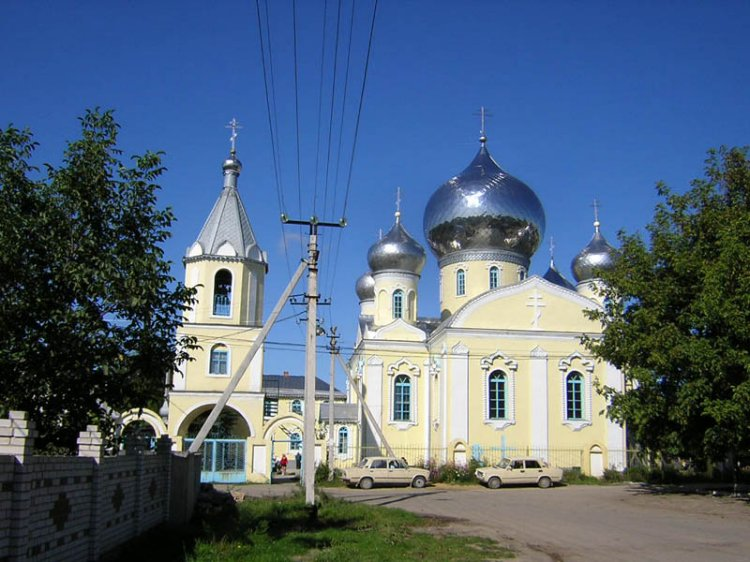
- Exaltation of the Holy Cross Church in Kodyma

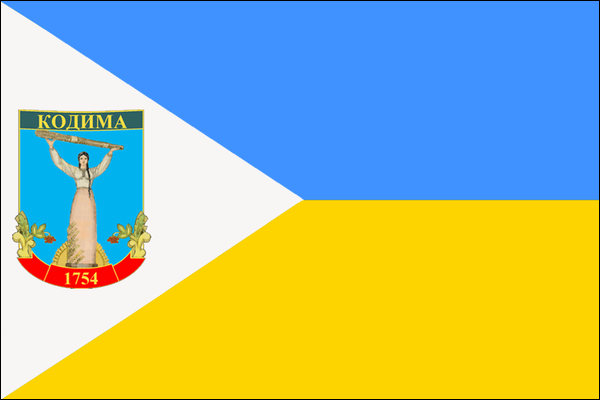
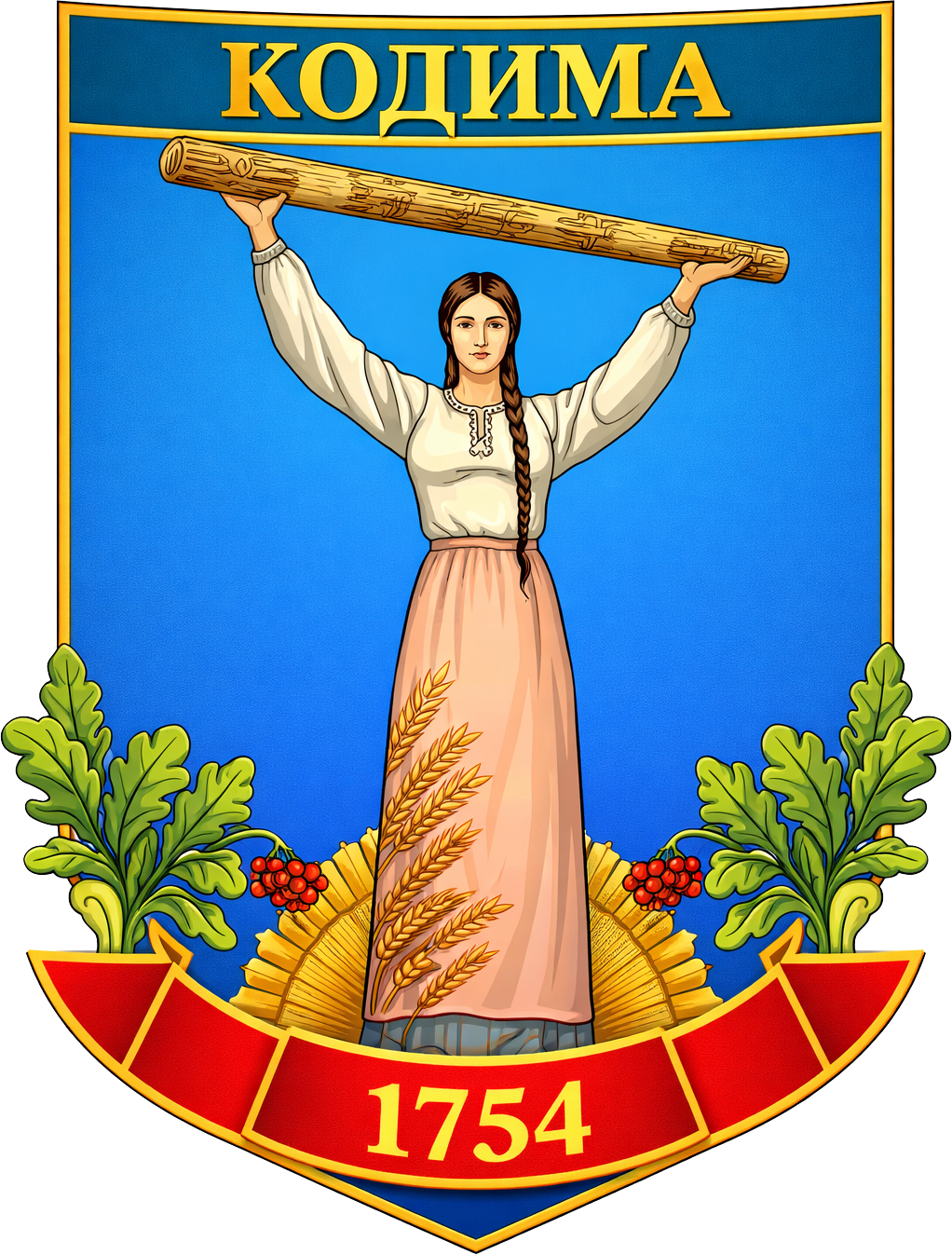
- Flag Coat of arms
- Interactive map of Kodyma
- Location in Odesa Oblast Location in Ukraine
- Coordinates: 48°6′0″N 29°7′0″E
- Country: Ukraine
- Oblast: Odesa Oblast
- Raion: Podilsk Raion
- Hromada: Kodyma urban hromada
- City founded: 1754

Government
  - Mayor: Serhiy Lupashko

Area
  - Total: 10.53 km^{2} (4.07 sq mi)
- Elevation: 266 m (873 ft)

Population (2022)
  - Total: 8,404
  - Density: 798.1/km^{2} (2,067/sq mi)
- Time zone: UTC+2 (EET)
  - Summer (DST): UTC+3 (EEST)
- Postal code: 66000-66003
- Area code: +380-4867
- Website: https://kodyma-mr.gov.ua/

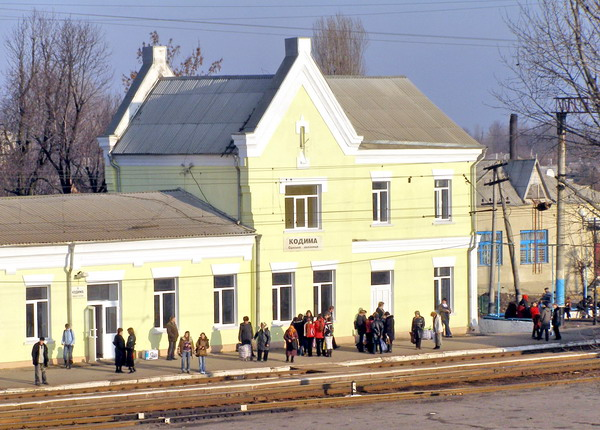
Kodyma railway station

Kodyma (Ukrainian: Кодима, pronounced [ˈkɔdɪmɐ]; Romanian: Codâma) is a city in Odesa Oblast (region) of central Ukraine, located in the historic region of Podolia, south-eastern Podilia. It hosts the administration of Kodyma urban hromada, one of the hromadas of Ukraine. Population: 8,404 (2022 estimate).

== Geography ==
Kodyma is named after the river Kodyma, on which it is located. The city lies in the eastern part of the historical region of Podolia.

== History ==
On maps of the 16th century of Wenceslaus Grodecki there is a region identified as "Codima solitudo, uastissima" (a very vast desert). The area is located around the mid-stream of Southern Bug. It is believed that the Kodyma's etymology of Turkic origin and means a lower saturated with water place.

In 1694 Cossacks of Semen Paliy defeated a Tatar army at the battle of Kodyma.

The modern city of Kodyma was founded by Józef Lubomirski (son of Jerzy Aleksander Lubomirski) in 1754. However, according to the Geographic Dictionary Kodyma as a real estate existed before and belonged to the family of Zamoyski. Later it transferred to the family of Koniecpolski after Johanna Barabara Zamoyska married Aleksander Koniecpolski. In the Polish Geographic dictionary (Słownik geograficzny) it is mentioned as a small town (miasteczko) in Balta county and has a train station on the Kyiv–Odesa railroad.

In 1919 Kodyma was a site of fighting between forces of the Ukrainian People's Republic, Bolsheviks and Denikin's White Army.

Until 18 July 2020, Kodyma was the administrative center of Kodyma Raion. The raion was abolished in July 2020 as part of the administrative reform of Ukraine, which reduced the number of raions of Odesa Oblast to seven. The area of Kodyma Raion was merged into Podilsk Raion.

== Demographics ==
As of the 2001 Ukrainian census, the town had a population of 9,493 people. In addition to the ethnic Ukrainian majority, which makes up more than 90% of the population, Kodyma is home to small Russian, Moldovan and Belarusian minorities. The settlement is overwhelmingly Ukrainian-speaking.

Ethnic groups in Kodyma
	percent
Ukrainians	92.84%
Russians	5.13%
Moldovans	0.77%
Belarusians	0.39%
Poles	0.13%
Gagauz	0.12%
Bulgarians	0.11%

Native languages according to the 2001 Ukrainian census:

Native languages in Kodyma
	percent
Ukrainian	93.0%
Russian	7.8%
Moldovan (Romanian)	0.3%
others	0.5%

The Ukrainian government classifies the Moldovan language as Romanian.

== Economy ==
Local industries include production of bricks, limestone procession and canning of vegetables.

== Notable people ==
- Leon Feinberg, Jewish-American Yiddish poet and journalist, was born in Kodyma
- Stanisław Skalski, a Polish fighter ace of the Polish Air Force in World War II, was born in Kodyma
- Anatoliy Pushnyakov, Ukrainian general and former commander of the Ukrainian Ground Forces
