= Gennady Obaturov =

Soviet general

Gennady Ivanovich Obaturov
- Born: 10 January [O.S. 28 December 1914] 1915; Maloe Zarecheno, Vyatka Governorate, Russian Empire
- Died: 29 April 1996 (aged 81); Moscow, Russia
- Military career
- Allegiance: Soviet Union
- Branch: Red Army
- Service years: 1935–1992
- Rank: Army General
- Conflicts: World War II; Hungarian Revolution of 1956; Operation Danube; Sino-Vietnamese War

Gennady Ivanovich Obaturov (Russian: Геннадий Иванович Обатуров; 10 January [O.S. 28 December] 1915 – 29 April 1996) was a Soviet Army General.

== Childhood and youth ==
Born in a peasant family in the village of Maloe Zarecheno, then part of the Marakulinsky Volost in the Slobodsky Uyezd of Vyatsky Province, Russia. His father was mobilized in the army and died in 1916 on the battlefront during World War I. The family counted five children. Following their mother's death in the early 20s the elder children became responsible for the household and Gennady began working in the field at age 9. In 1930 finished the seven years school for peasant youth. In 1933 finished the Gorky Cooperative Technical School. Worked in Vyatka as production head of the town workers cooperative catering department.

== Military service ==
Obaturov volunteered for the Red Army in October 1935 and graduated from the Orlov Tank College in 1938. Between 1938 and 1939, he served in the Far East – platoon commander, infantry regiment weapons instructor, infantry regiment deputy head of staff for reconnaissance.

Obaturov graduated from the Frunze Military Academy in 1941 after the German-Soviet War had begun, but was not sent to the front. Evacuated together with the academy to Tashkent and appointed there as a junior teacher in tactics.

== World War II ==
Commissioned to the battlefront in May 1942 as armored brigade deputy head of staff in charge of operations. In the ranks of the 11th Tank Corps took part in the defensive actions on the Bryansk Front. Within a month after being commissioned to the battlefront, he commanded the armored offensive replacing the fallen unit commander. His tank was shot in battle, Obaturov himself was heavily injured and burnt inside the tank. He was treated for three-month in a hospital in Kemerovo.

In November 1942 Obaturov was appointed deputy commander of an armored regiment in the 11th Army of the Northwestern Front. He took part in the actions against the German Demyansk Pocket, as well as in the Second Demyansk Offensive in the spring of 1943. Twice wounded at Demyansk.

Following recovery was sent to the southern sector of the Soviet-German front. From October 1943 fought on the Southern, 3rd Ukrainian and 2nd Ukrainian Fronts as staff commander of the 13th Guards Mechanized Brigade. Distinguished himself in the Melitopol Offensive (where he was wounded a fourth time), the Nikolsko-Krivorozhskaya Operation, Bereznegovato-Snigirevskaya Operation, and the Second Jassy–Kishinev Offensive.

In the spring of 1944 appointed commander of the same brigade and at its head liberated Belgrade, and took part in the Budapest Offensive. At the end of 1944 was wounded a fifth time. Met the end of the war in Slovakia.

Obaturov showed himself as a skilful tactical commander and a brave officer. During three years of fighting was decorated with seven orders for combat and the medal "For Service in Battle".

== Post-war service ==
In 1945 commanded a mechanized regiment, and later an independent armoured battalion. From December 1945 until June 1950 – commanded the 13th Guards Mechanized Regiment. In 1950 Graduated from the Military Academy of the General Staff, appointed commander of the 33rd Guards Mechanized Division. This division was incorporated in an independent mechanized army and was located in the Romanian town of Timișoara, in the proximity of the Hungarian border. Major-General of the Armoured Forces (1954).

== Hungarian Revolt ==
Soon after the beginning of the Hungarian Revolt the division of General Obaturov was raised and received an order to cross the Hungarian border, march on Budapest and take under control the main state objects. By 24 October 1956, an advanced detachment of the division led by Obaturov entered Budapest. The division commander had not been briefed on the situation in the city; the units had received no maps whatsoever, and no officers knowing the city had been detached. The units drawing into the city were attacked from different sides, isolated from each other and suffered loss. In such conditions, Obaturov self-dependently decided to stop the execution of the operational task by ordering units to assume all-round defense. During heavy street fighting, he succeeded in restoring the connection between units. Then in agreement with the Imre Nagy government the soviet command withdrew soviet forces from Budapest and a few days later ordered the storming of the city. The division of Obaturov participated at full strength in this operation. During these operations, the division lost over 150 men, 13 tanks, 1 self-propelled artillery mounting, 9 armored personnel carriers. The division commander was decorated with the Order of Suvorov, 2nd class. In the same year, the division was incorporated into the newly formed Southern Group of Forces.

== Service in the 60-70s ==
In 1957 completed the Higher Academic Courses of the Military Academy of the General Staff. From February 1958 commanded the 12th Army Corps in the North Caucasus Military District, this corps trained for operational action in mountainous conditions and was dislocated in the North Ossetian ASSR, Kabardino-Balkarian ASSR, and Chechen-Ingush ASSR.

In May 1960 appointed commander of the 6th Guards Tank Army in the Kiev Military District. General-Lieutenant of the Armoured Forces (1963). From July 1966 – Deputy Commander of the North Caucasus Military District. From May 1968 – Deputy Commander of the Carpathian Military District. In August a significant number of the district units were sent to Czechoslovakia (see Operation Danube). Decorated with the Order of the Red Banner for the successful conduct of the operation.

From July 1969 – acting commander, and from January 1970 – commander of the Carpathian Military District. Colonel-General (1970). From August 1973 – USSR Ministry of Defense First Deputy Inspector General.

== Vietnam War and final years of service ==
In January 1979 Obaturov was commissioned to Vietnam as Senior Military Adviser to the National Defense Ministry of the Socialist Republic of Vietnam. Was conferred the rank of General of the Army by decree of the Presidium of the USSR Supreme Council dated 19 February 1979. Soon after arrival in Vietnam, the Chinese forces crossed Vietnam's northern border triggering the Sino-Vietnamese War. At the head of a task force Obaturov rapidly reached the battle zone and according to eyewitnesses of the events, played an important role in influencing the decisions of the Vietnamese command and political leadership relating to the field operations. Played an important role in halting the Chinese offensive within the border area, and inflicting substantial losses on the invader. By the end of March 1979, China withdrew its forces from all regions in Vietnam. In subsequent years, besides helping with the re-fitting and re-organization of the Armed Forces of Vietnam, he worked on the foundation of the Armed Forces of Laos and Kampuchea (Cambodia).

From November 1982 – commander of the Frunze Military Academy. From 1985 – Military Inspector-Adviser on the Inspectors General Panel of the USSR Ministry of Defense. From 1992 – retired. Lived in Moscow. Obaturov was buried in the Troekurovskoe Cemetery.

Deputy of the Supreme Council of the USSR's 8th convocation (1970–1974). Twice elected as a deputy of the Supreme Council of Ukraine in the 1960s. Member of the All-Union Communist Party Bolsheviks since 1940. Was a member of the Communist Party of Ukraine Central Committee in the 1960-1970s.

== Decorations ==
- Order of Zhukov (Russian Federation, decree of 7 November 1995)
- Two Orders of Lenin (? 8 January 1985)
- Order of the October Revolution (8.01.1975)
- Three Orders of the Red Banner
- Order of Suvorov 2nd Class
- Two Orders of the Patriotic War 1st Class
- Order of the Patriotic War 2nd Class
- Three Orders of the Red Star
- Nineteen medals of the Soviet Union
- Four orders and twenty-two medals of foreign governments

== Links and sources ==
http://www.generalarmy.ru (in Russian)

War encyclopedia in 8 volumes. М.:Military publishing house, 1994–2004. — V.6.
