= Oleksandr Zatynaiko =

Ukrainian Colonel General

- Олександр Іванович Затинайко
- Born: Oleksandr Ivanovych Zatynaiko; 30 January 1949 (age 77); Otradne, Ukrainian SSR, Soviet Union
- Military career
- Allegiance: Soviet Union; Ukraine
- Branch: Soviet Army; Ukrainian Ground Forces

Oleksandr Ivanovych Zatynaiko (Ukrainian: Олександр Іванович Затинайко; born 30 January 1949, Otdradne, Hrebinka Raion, Ukrainian SSR) is a former member of the Ukrainian military. Colonel General Zatynaiko served as the Chief of General Staff and Commander of the Ukrainian Ground Forces.

Zatynaiko started his military career in the Group of Soviet Forces in Germany in 1970 after graduating the Kyiv Higher Combined Arms College. After graduating from the M. V. Frunze Military Academy in 1973, he served in military units of Kyiv Military District where he held command of a battalion and later a regiment. In 1985–1987 Zatynaiko was a commander of the Soviet separate brigade in Cuba. In 1987–1991 in Siberian Military District he commanded a division and was awarded the military order "For service to the Homeland".

In 1993 Zatynaiko graduated from the Military Academy of the General Staff of the Armed Forces of Russia. The same year he was placed in command of the 13th Army Corps in Ukraine (former Soviet 13th Army). In 1996–1998 Zatynaiko was a chief of the General Staff of the Ukrainian Armed Forces. In 1997 under his command there was developed the "Ukrainian Armed Forces build up program until 2010" (Ukrainian: Програма будівництва Збройних Сил України до 2010 року).

In 1998 the President of Ukraine Leonid Kuchma placed Zatynaiko in charge of the Southern Operational Command which was perceived as a demotion. However Minister of Defence of Ukraine Oleksandr Kuzmuk explained that it is in no way related to miscalculations in development of the Army as Southern Operational Command is the most important in a sphere of responsibility. In 2001–2002 Zatynaiko was a commander of the Ukrainian Ground Forces.

In 2002 he returned in charge of General Staff and developed program of further development of Armed Forces "Defence policy. The White Book" (Ukrainian: Оборонна політика. Біла книга) with a deep analysis of armament and technology status of the Ukrainian military.

Military offices
| Preceded by Petro Shulyak | Chief of the General Staff; 2002–2004 | Succeeded by Serhiy Kirichenko |
| Preceded by Petro Shulyak | Commander of the Ground Forces; 2001–2002 | Succeeded by Mykola Petruk |
| Preceded by Anatoliy Lopata | Chief of the General Staff; 1996–1998 | Succeeded by Volodymyr Shkidchenko |
