= 1129th Anti-aircraft Missile Regiment (Ukraine) =

- 1129-й зенітний ракетний полк
- Regiment insignia
- Founded: 1992
- Country: Ukraine
- Allegiance: Ministry of Defence
- Branch: Ukrainian Ground Forces
- Type: Anti-aircraft unit
- Role: Air defense
- Size: Regiment
- Garrison/HQ: Bila Tserkva
- Mottos: "For Ukraine, honor and glory"
- Engagements: Russo-Ukrainian War; War in Donbass; Russian invasion of Ukraine; Northern Ukraine campaign; Eastern Ukraine campaign; Southern Ukraine campaign

Commanders
- Current commander: Colonel Voloshchuk Vadym Ivanovich

Insignia
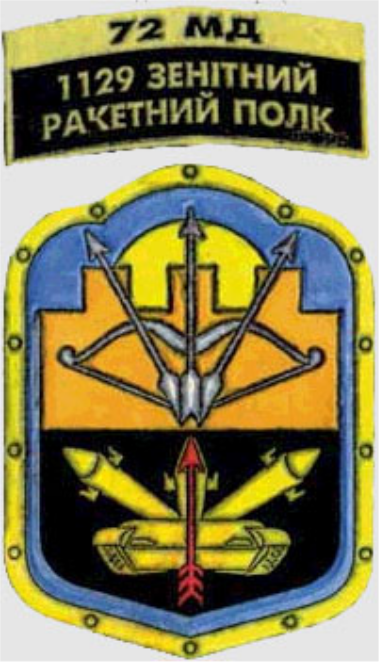
- Former Insignia (1996-2010)

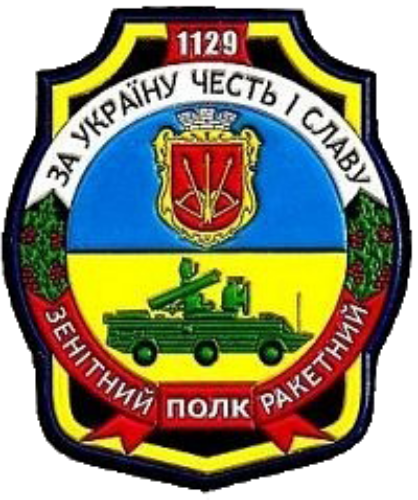
- Former Insignia (2000-2010)

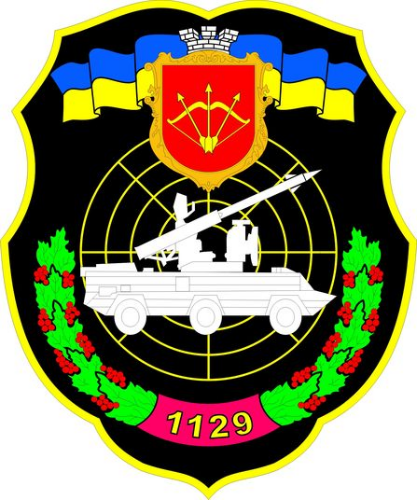
- Former Insignia (2010-2021)

1129th Anti-Aircraft Missile Regiment "Belotserkivskyi" (MUN A1232) is an anti-aircraft regiment unit level military unit of the Ukrainian Ground Forces, operationally under the command of Operational Command North. The Regiment is based in Bila Tserkva. It has seen combat during both the War in Donbass and the Russian invasion of Ukraine operating a variety of equipment.

== History ==
On 19 January 1992, following the Dissolution of the Soviet Union, the 1129th Anti-Aircraft Missile Regiment came under the jurisdiction of Ukraine, and the personnel swore allegiance to Ukraine, constantly participating in live fire training at the "Chauda" training ground, located in the Autonomous Republic of Crimea. Until 2002, it was part of the 72nd Guards Mechanized Division but was transferred to the 8th Army Corps as the 72nd was reformed to a brigade. In 2004, the regiment became part of the Joint Rapid Reaction Force. In the prologue of the Russian invasion of Ukraine, the regiment was trained by Canadian instructors for the use of MANPADs.

After the start of the War in Donbass in March 2014, the regiment was mobilized and in July 2014, the unit's personnel were deployed directly to the ATO zone. In 2014, the regiment's 6th anti-aircraft missile battery during the Battle of Debaltseve carried out two combat launches and destroyed a separatist drone. In total, it operated in Hranitne, Kuteynikovo, Debaltseve and Popasna. On 21 August 2014, a soldier of the regiment (Eremenko Andriy Vitaliyovych) was killed by Separatist artillery on the positions of an anti-aircraft missile battery of the regiment. On 4 December 2014, a soldier of the Regiment (Zabolotny Vyacheslav Anatolyovich) was killed in a BM-21 Grad strike at a checkpoint near Volnovakha. On 20 January 2016, a soldier of the regiment (Roman Oleksandrovych Slepovsky) was killed in action in Donbass. From April to November 2018, the regiment performed combat missions in the ATO zone. As of 19 January 2022, more than 200 personnel of the regiment have been decorated.

Following the Russian invasion of Ukraine, it saw combat. on 11 May 2022, a soldier of the regiment (Roenko Roman Vasylolich) was killed in action. In the summer of 2022, it was shooting down Russian UAVs operating in Zaporizhzhia Oblast. On 24 August 2022, the Regiment was awarded the honorary name "Belotserkivskyi". In February 2023, the regiment's major task was the air defense of Kyiv from Russian drone swarm and missile attacks being called the "Guardian Angels of Kyiv". On 5 May 2023, a soldier of the regiment (Andriy Kotlyarsky) was killed near Yelizavetivka as a vehicle of the regiment was hit by a Russian missile. On 28 July 2023, the regiment was awarded the honorary award "For Courage and Bravery". In September 2023, its forces shot down Russian cruise missiles using American AN/TWQ-1 Avenger SAM and FIM-92 Stinger MANPADS as well as 12.7 mm M2 Browning machine gun. In December 2023, the regiment was using British Alvis Stormer SAMs to shoot down Russian drones with one system destroying 20 drones at a certain time and another destroying 46 targets in total. In 2023, it also took part in the Battle of Bakhmut. It was reported in February 2024 that it has been regularly downing multiple Russian Shahed drones everyday with its mobile groups utilizing Humvees and Stingers for their operation. In June 2024, its forces were using modernized 9K33 Osa to take down Russian UAVs, some of the systems being donated by Poland. On 21 August 2024, a soldier of the regiment (Volodymyr Shvets) was killed in action on the frontlines. On 11 October 2024, it destroyed 145 Russian reconnaissance UAVs in a "short time". On 25 October 2024, it destroyed a Russian ZALA Lancet using FPV drones. In November 2024, it again used AN/TWQ-1 and Stingers to repel a massive Russian attack in Kyiv. On 19 January 2025, a counterdrone UAV of the regiment successfully took down a Russia experimental "Merlin-VR" Supercam UAV with a red star and inscription "For the Motherland". In February 2025, more than 500 Wild Hornets FPV drones were transferred to the regiment. On 21 February 2025, it took down 6 Russian reconnaissance UAVs in a series of strikes.

== Equipment ==
| Model | Image | Origin | Type | Number | Details |
SAM sites
| 9K33 Osa | | Soviet Union | Low-altitude, short-range tactical surface-to-air missile system | | |
| 2K12 Kub | | Poland; Soviet Union | Mobile surface-to-air missile system, low to medium-level air defence system | 2+ | |
| AN/TWQ-1 Avenger | | United States | Mobile, short-range, self-propelled surface-to-air missile air defense system | | |
| Alvis Stormer | | United Kingdom | Mobile short-range air defence capable armored fighting vehicle | | |
Anti-aircraft machine guns
| ZU-23-2 | | Soviet Union | 23×152mm anti-aircraft twin-barreled autocannon | | |
| M2 Browning | | United States | Anti-aircraft heavy machine gun | | |
Support Vehicles
| BTR-60 | | Soviet Union | Command Vehicle | | Modified into PU-12 |
| PPRU-1 | | Soviet Union | Mobile reconnaissance and command center for tactical air defence systems | | |
| 1S91M | | Soviet Union | Mobile Radar Reconnaissance Center | | |
MANPADS
| 9K38 Igla | | Soviet Union | Man-portable infrared homing surface-to-air missile | | |
| FIM-92 Stinger | | United States | Man-portable infrared homing surface-to-air missile | | |

== Commanders ==
- Colonel Kotelyanets Petro Oleksandrovych (1991–1997)
- Colonel Anatoly Andrienko (2004–2007)
- Colonel Yuriy Solovey (2007–2012)
- Colonel Feshchenko Serhiy Mykolayovych (2012–2018)
- Colonel Voloshchuk Vadym Ivanovich (2018–present)

== Sources ==
- Військові частини Сухопутних військ за родами військ
- 1129-й зенитно-ракетный полк
