= 12th Support Regiment (Ukraine) =

- 12-й окремий полк підтримки
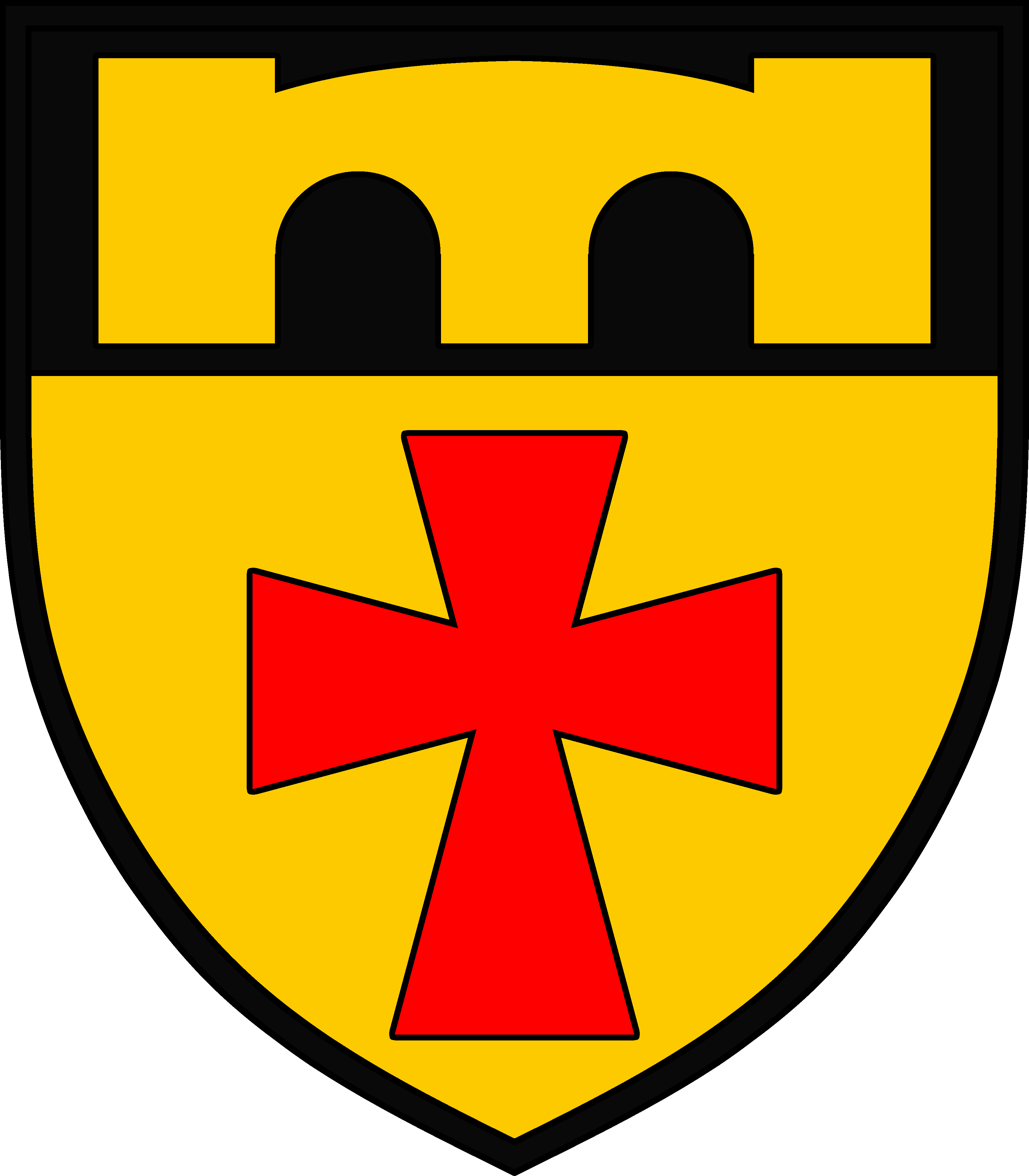
- Founded: 1968
- Country: Ukraine
- Branch: Ukrainian Ground Forces
- Type: Regiment
- Role: Engineering
- Part of: Support Forces Command
- Garrison/HQ: Zvyahel
- Engagements: United Nations peacekeeping; UNMIA III; UNIFIL; UNAMSIL; MNF-I; UNAMIL; Kosovo Force; Russo-Ukrainian War; War in Donbass; Russian invasion of Ukraine

Insignia
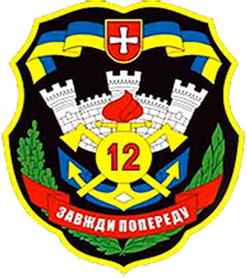
- Former Insignia

The 12th Support Regiment (MUN A3814, post B2381) is a regiment level military unit of the Ukrainian Support Forces, part of the Armed Forces of Ukraine. It was established in 1968 as the 1591st Separate Engineering Road and Bridge Construction Battalion of the 8th Tank Army of the Soviet Armed Forces. It is headquartered in Zvyahel. It has seen combat during both, the War in Donbass and the Russian invasion of Ukraine.

== History ==
It was established as the 1591st Separate Engineering Road and Bridge Construction Battalion of the 8th Tank Army on 1 September 1968. In May 1971, the 136th Engineer Road and Bridge Construction Regiment was deployed at the battalion base, which was sent to the Kyiv Military District to set up routes and build bridges at the Chernihiv Training Center. In August and September 1972, the battalion was engaged in extinguishing fires in the Moscow Military District for which it was awarded the pennant "For courage and bravery during fires." Following the Chernobyl incident in April 1986, the battalion was deployed and was expanded to the 136th Engineer Road and Bridge Construction Regiment on 4 May 1986. On May 12, the regiment was stationed 25 km from the Chernobyl Nuclear Power Plant, in Dymarka building roads to Pripyat, bypassing Chernobyl and on Zeleny Cape, it also expanded the bridge over the Uzh River, decontaminated soil, and restored central heating in Chernobyl. It was awarded the Vympel "For Courage and Military Victory" and the transitional Red Banner. In September 1988, it participated in the "Autumn-88" and was awarded the Vympel "For Military Victory".

Following the Dissolution of the Soviet Union, in 1992, the 1591st Separate Engineering Battalion came under the jurisdiction of Ukraine and was reformed into the 12th Engineering Regiment on 1 December 1994. The regiment actively participates in various exercises, including "Reaction-2005", "Clear Sky-2006", "Artery-2007", "Interaction-2010", "Adequate Response-2011", "Perspective-2012". From 2008 till 2013, it has been a permanent participant in the Ukrainian-American command and staff exercises "Rapid Trident", passing the first and second NATO assessments being recognized as compatible with the Alliance units and entered the joint fund of NATO operational forces and capabilities. Its personnel were involved in several peacekeeping missions around the world, including UNIFIL, UNAMSIL and MNF-I. Seven of the regiment are involved in United Nations Mission in Liberia. It also participated in peacekeeping as part of the Kosovo Force with its 28 sappers, a mine detection dog Lais and 13 units of equipment being deployed in Kosovo under the command of Captain Andriy Bratashchuk. stationed at the "Maréchal de Latre" base and were awarded medals by the KFOR commander, Major General Salvatore Farina of the Italian Army. Throughout the years it participated in dealing with environmental hazards, fires at artillery depots in Lozova and Novobohdanivka, restoration of bridges and dams destroyed by floods, clearing of roads, demining, ordinance disposal and construct of 10 bridges, including a 96-meter bridge in Vitkovychi, a 64-meter bridge across the Teteriv River in Stavky and a 53-meter bridge across the Stokhid River in Berezychi, as well as educational work at the Novohrad-Volyn school-collegium. In December 2013, the 12th Engineer Regiment and the 144th Separate Chemical and Biological Weapons Battalion were joined into the 12th Separate Operational Support Regiment. It was also equipped with I-52 minelayers.

In March 2014, after the Russian invasion of Crimea, the regiment's personnel began installing fortifications and minefields on the administrative border with Crimea. Since the start of the War in Donbass, it saw heavy action, such as defending positions on Mount Karachun, liberating Sloviansk and Kramatorsk, building bridges across the Seversky Donets, laying and maintaining minefields, strengthening positions and conducting engineering reconnaissance tasks. The regiment's servicemen conducted tasks in Amvrosiivka, Starohnativka, Luhansk and Donetsk Airports, and Debaltseve. A soldier of the regiment (Podolyanchuk Vasyl Volodymyrovych) was killed as a result of an accidental mine detonation in Kairka on 18 September 2014. A soldier of the regiment (Shepel Igor Viktorovich) was killed on 3 November 2014, while performing a combat mission in the ATO zone. A soldier of the regiment (Banchuk Oleg Petrovych) died on 15 January 2015. Two soldiers of the Regiment (Shelmuk Anatoly Volodymyrovych and Shtilov Serhiy Stepanovych) were killed in action on 11 February 2015. On 29 October 2015, a fire broke out at the field ammunition depot of the Armed Forces of Ukraine in Svatove, the detonation sent shrapnel flying across the city, damaging many buildings. Two soldiers of the regiment (Artemenko Anatoly Vyacheslavovych and Mayorenko Stanislav Oleksiyovych) and another soldier were killed. A civilian was killed and another was wounded as well. A soldier of the regiment (Volodymyr Pavlovych Gordin) was killed in combat on 5 May 2016 near Borovenky. A soldier of the regiment (Oleg Volodymyrovych) was killed on 24 June 2016 in Novooleksandrivka. On 13 May 2020 while performing engineering work at a stronghold in Katerynivka, a sniper shot and killed a soldier of the regiment (Karpyka Oleksandr Vitaliyovych).

Following the Russian invasion of Ukraine, the regiment saw combat. It has been highly involved in mine laying tasks. On 22 January 2024, a soldier of the brigade (Levkovsky Maksym Vasilyovych) was severely wounded by artillery strikes in Chasiv Yar and died of his wounds on 2 February 2024. It was responsible for extensive mine laying during the 2024 Kursk offensive, its landmines halted a Russian advance on 7 November destroying 17 vehicles of the 810th Naval Infantry Brigade. The regiment's personnel was being trained under Operation Interflex in the United Kingdom and were visited by Valeriy Zaluzhny during their training.

== Commanders ==
- Lieutenant Colonel Klyuchko Pantelii Fedorovych (1968–1970)
- Lieutenant Colonel Viktor Yefremovich Khudyaev (1970–1972)
- Major Baturyn Vadim Serhiyovych (1972–1974)
- Major Alexiev Nikolay Ivanovich (1974–1977)
- Captain Budaev Laidap Balzhynimaevich (1977)
- Lieutenant Colonel Ivanko Oleksandr Mykhailovych (1977–1987)
- Major Dereglazov Anatoly Mikhailovich (1987–1989)
- Colonel Yuriy Ivanovych Leshchenko (1989–1994)
- Colonel Yuriy Ivanovych Leshchenko (1989–2002)
- Lieutenant Colonel/Colonel Pekelny Vasyl Leonidovich (2002–2007)
- Lieutenant Colonel Dmytro Mykhailovych Gerega (2007–2008)
- Colonel Borisov Mykola Mykolayovych (2008-11 February 2019)
- Colonel Anatoliy Stanislavovych Zagursky (11 February 2019-)
