= Kodyma Raion =

Former subdivision of Odesa Oblast, Ukraine

Kodyma Raion Кодимський район
- Raion
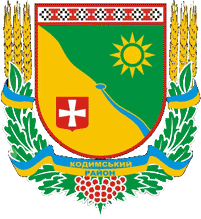
- Flag Coat of arms

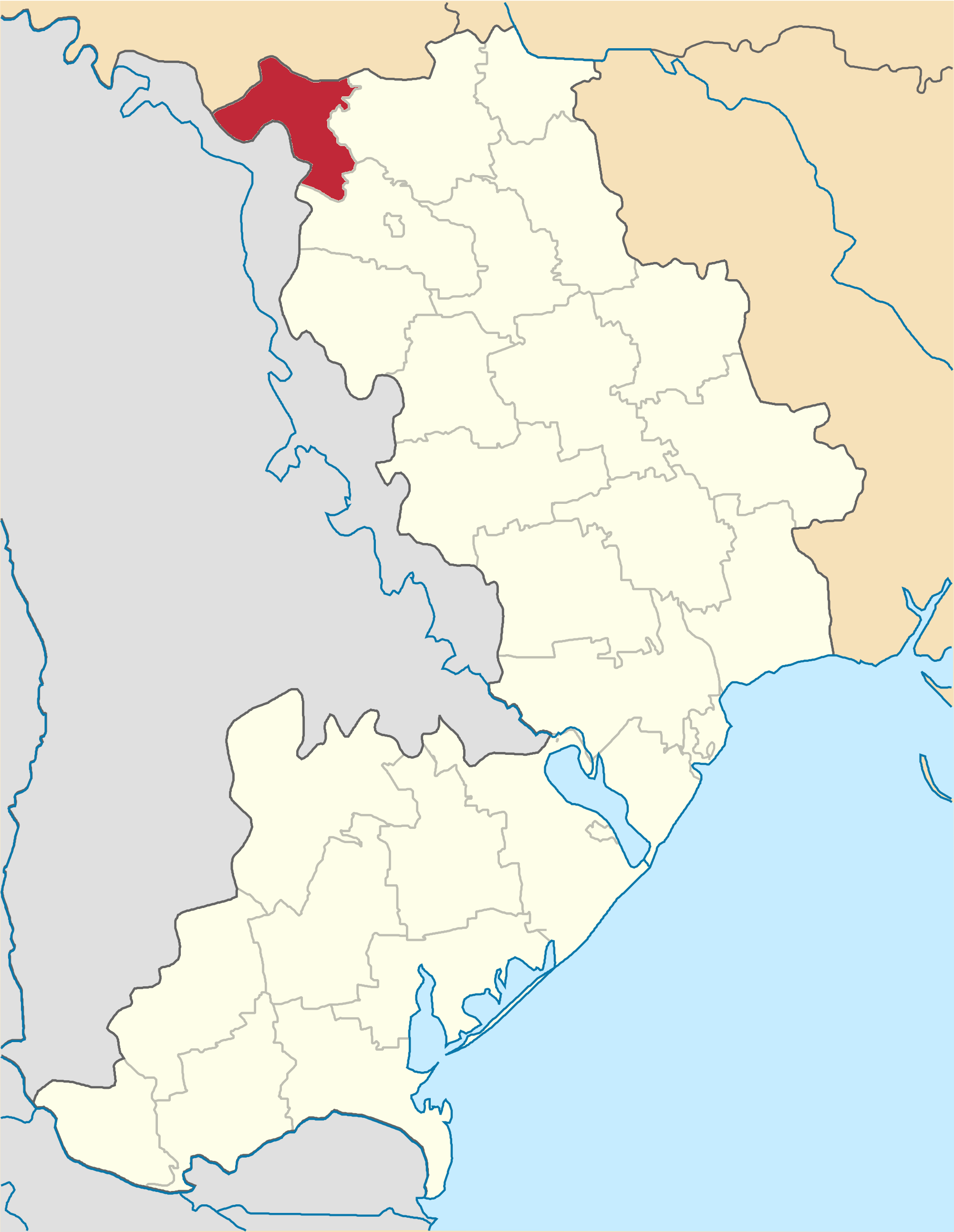
- Coordinates: 48°1′24″N 29°8′27″E
- Country: Ukraine
- Oblast: Odesa Oblast
- Established: 1940
- Disestablished: 18 July 2020
- Admin. center: Kodyma
- Subdivisions: List: 1 — city councils; 1 — settlement councils; 17 — rural councils; Number of localities: 1 — cities; 1 — urban-type settlements; 24 — villages; 0 — rural settlements

Government
  - Governor: Svyatoslav Ohinskyi

Area
  - Total: 818 km^{2} (316 sq mi)

Population (2020)
  - Total: 28,282 ▼
  - Density: 34.6/km^{2} (89.5/sq mi)
- Time zone: UTC+02:00 (EET)
  - Summer (DST): UTC+03:00 (EEST)
- Postal index: 66000—66052
- Area code: +380 4867
- Website: http://kodima-rda.odessa.gov.ua/

Kodyma Raion (Ukrainian: Кодимський район) was a raion (district) in Odesa Oblast of Ukraine. Its administrative center was the city of Kodyma. The raion was abolished on 18 July 2020 as part of the administrative reform of Ukraine, which reduced the number of raions of Odesa Oblast to seven. The area of Kodyma Raion was merged into Podilsk Raion. The last estimate of the raion population was 28,282 (2020 est.).

At the time of disestablishment, the raion consisted of two hromadas:

- Kodyma urban hromada with the administration in Kodyma;
- Slobidka settlement hromada with the administration in the urban-type settlement of Slobidka.
