= Petro Shulyak =

Chief of the General Staff - Ukraine Armed Forces

- Петро Іванович Шуляк
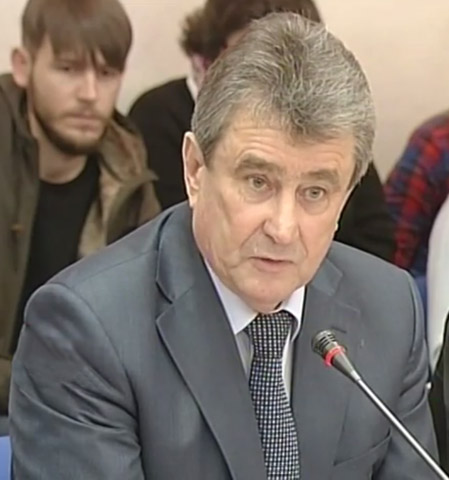
- Shulyak in March 2014
- Born: Petro Ivanovych Shulyak; 29 March 1945 (age 81); Korshiv, Rivne Oblast, Ukrainian SSR, Soviet Union
- Military career
- Allegiance: Ukraine
- Branch: Ukrainian Air Force
- Service years: 1992-
- Rank: Liutenant General
- Commands: Carpathian Military District (1994-1998)

Petro Ivanovych Shulyak (Ukrainian: Петро Іванович Шуляк; born 29 March 1945) is a serviceman of the Ukrainian military, Colonel General who served as the Chief of General Staff and Commander of the Ukrainian Ground Forces.

== Career ==
Native of Ukraine, on 30 January 1992 Shulyak was dismissed from his post of chief of cadres (personnel) administration of the Baltic Military District for expressing his interest in joining the Ukrainian Armed Forces as the "alien army".

Following the incident, Minister of Defence of Ukraine Kostiantyn Morozov offered him the position of commander of the 13th Army located in the Carpathian Military District based in Rivne, a native region of Shulyak. Soon thereafter Shulyak was placed in charge of the Carpathian Military District. As a commander of the district, he played an important role in the formation, training and deployment of the Ukrainian peacekeeping military formations to Yugoslavia and Angola.

Due to dissolution of the Soviet Union and the financial crisis that followed, the district had difficult times paying salaries to military personnel and providing them with adequate housing, but was able to overcome it with the help of the local government. The Carpathian Military District became one of the first that joined the NATO program Partnership for Peace. As part of the program in 1995 near Yavoriv was conducted joined United States – Ukraine military exercise. Six years later, Shulyak as a Commander of the Ukrainian Armed Forces, turned the Yavoriv field training site into a special Partnership for Peace training center. As part of international cooperation, Shulyak was also involved in the creation of the Polish–Ukrainian Peace Force Battalion, the idea for which appeared soon after the visit of Polish general Zenon Brik to the Carpathian Military District.

Due to the 2002 Sknyliv air show disaster, Shulyak was dismissed from post of chief of the General Staff by President of Ukraine and Supreme commander-in-chief Leonid Kuchma.

In 2003, as a commander of the Ukrainian Ground Forces, Colonel General Petro Shulyak, with a group of officers, visited Iraq, where, as part of a multi-national force, a peacekeeping mission was carried out by the 5th Separate Mechanized Brigade. Based in Al Kut, the Ukrainian military carried out its mission mostly at the Iraq–Iran state border.

Military offices
| Preceded by Mykola Palchuk as acting | Chief of the General Staff; 2001–2002 | Succeeded by Oleksandr Zatynaiko |
| Preceded by Vasyl Sobkov | Commander of the Ground Forces; 1998–2001 | Succeeded by Oleksandr Zatynaiko |
