= Svyatoslav Zaits =

Ukrainian Military Officer

Brigadier General Svyatoslav Zaits
- Святослав Заїць
- Official portrait, 2026
- Military career
- Allegiance: Ukraine
- Branch: Ukrainian Ground Forces
- Rank: Brigadier General
- Commands: Ukrainian Ground Forces; 20th Army Corps
- Awards: Order of Bohdan Khmelnytsky, 3rd degree (2016), 2nd degree (2022), 1st degree (2022); Medal "For Military Service to Ukraine"

Svyatoslav Anatoliyovych Zaits (Ukrainian: Святослав Анатолійович Заїць) is a Ukrainian military officer who is the current commanding officer of the Ukrainian Ground Forces since 2026. Zaits replaced the previous Brigadier General Hennadii Shapovalov after his dismissal by Volodymyr Zelenskyy, the president of Ukraine. His appointment was made public on 2 September 2026.

== Biography ==
Zaits served in the Ukrainian Air Assault Forces. In 2014, Russia invaded the Crimean peninsula where Zaitsya was stationed with the 25th Airborne Brigade where he led a unit of around 100 men in the defense of the Crimean Peninsula.

He then served as the Chief of staff and Deputy Commanding Officer of the 8th Corps of the Air Assault Forces and later the 20th Army Corps.

In 2024, Zaits also held the role of commander of training for all Ukrainian Airborne operations until 2026 when he was appointed the commanding officer of the 20th Army Corps until his promotion to Brigadier General in 2026 and assignment as commander of Ukrainian Land Forces in the same year.

== Awards and recognition ==
Zaits was awarded the Medal "For Military Service to Ukraine" in 2015.

He was inducted as a Full Knight of the Order of Bohdan Khmelnytsky; Third Degree on 2 December 2016, he then earned his second and first degree Knighthood in 2022, his second degree on 22 May 2022, and his first degree on 17 November 2022.
