= Kodyma urban hromada =

Coordinates: 48°05′N 29°07′E

Kodyma urban hromada Кодимська міська громада
- Hromada
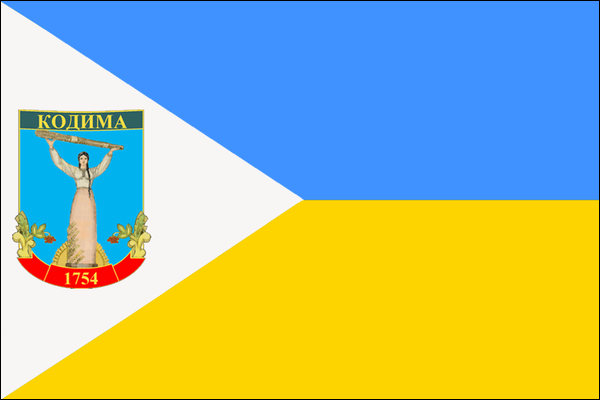
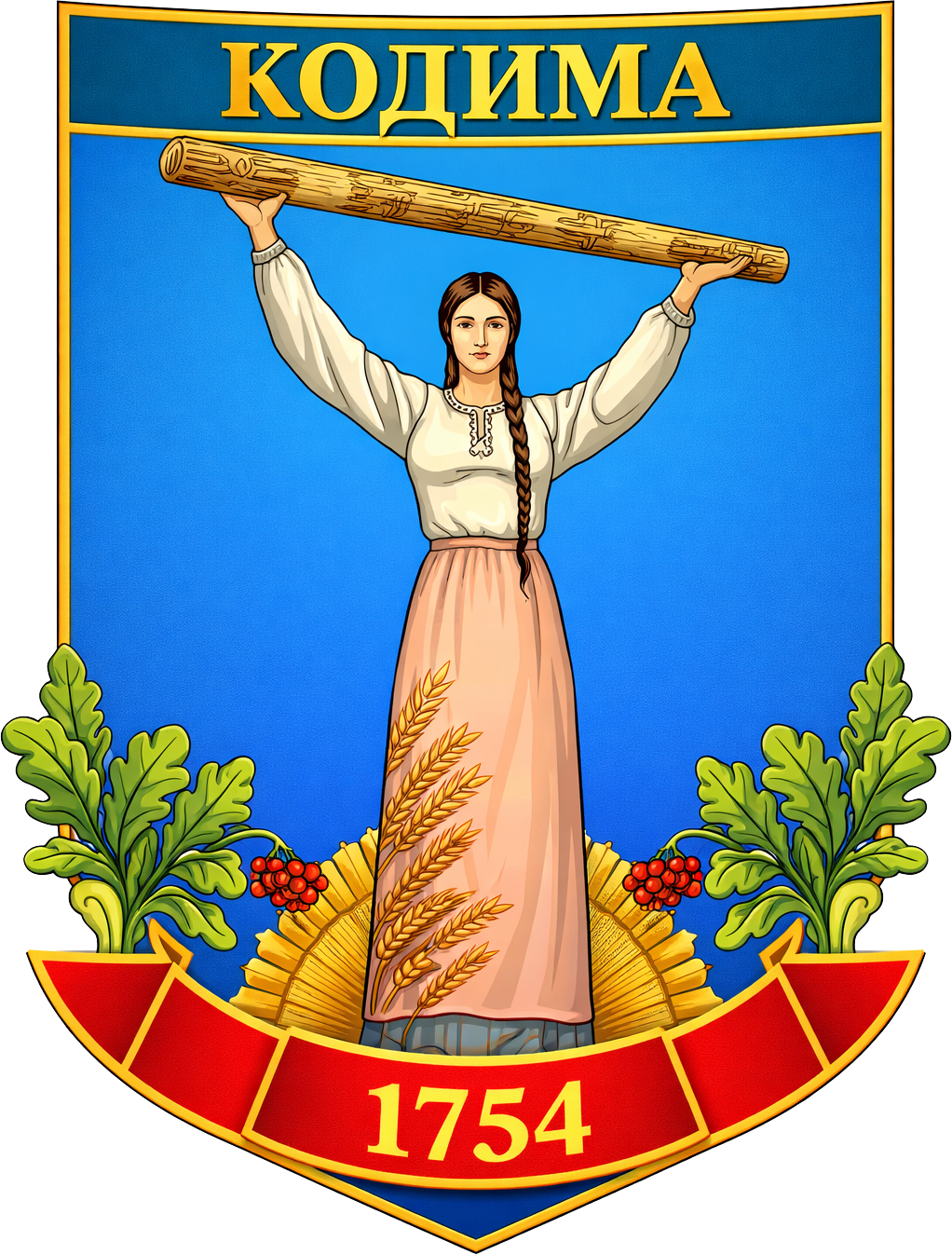
- Flag Coat of arms
- Interactive map of Kodyma urban hromada
- Country: Ukraine
- Oblast: Odesa Oblast
- Raion: Podilsk Raion
- Admin. center: Kodyma

Area
  - Total: 706.3 km^{2} (272.7 sq mi)

Population (2024)
  - Total: 25,251
  - Density: 35.75/km^{2} (92.59/sq mi)
- CATOTTG code: UA51120090000035170
- Settlements: 21
- Cities: 1
- Villages: 20

Kodyma urban hromada (Ukrainian: Кодимська міська громада) is a hromada in Podilsk Raion of Odesa Oblast in southwestern Ukraine. Population: 24,777 (2020 est.)

The hromada consists of a city of Kodyma and 9 villages:

- Bashtankiv
- Budei
- Fedorivka
- Hrabove
- Ivashkiv
- Kruti
- Labushne
- Lysohirka
- Oleksandrivka
- Oleksiivka
- Petrivka
- Pyrizhna
- Pysarivka
- Semenivka
- Serby
- Serhiivka
- Shershentsi
- Smolianka
- Strymba
- Zahnitkiv
