= 8th Tank Army =

8th Mechanised Army 8th Tank Army
- Active: 12 June 1946 – 1 December 1993
- Country: Soviet Union
- Branch: Soviet Army (1946–1993)
- Type: Tank Army
- Part of: Carpathian Military District
- Anniversaries: 6 June 1946
- Engagements: Operation Whirlwind; Operation Danube
- Decorations: Order of the Red Banner

Commanders
- Notable commanders: Nikolay Pukhov; Alexei Burdeinei; Dmitry Lelyushenko; Hamazasp Babadzhanian

The 8th Tank Army was one of ten Soviet tank armies. It was formed from the 52nd Army after the end of World War II. It was stationed around the city of Zhytomyr, in the western Ukrainian SSR, part of the Carpathian Military District. During the Cold War, the army was involved in the crushing of the Hungarian Revolution of 1956, Operation Whirlwind, and the crushing of the Prague Spring, Operation Danube. After the Dissolution of the Soviet Union, the 8th Tank Army became the Ukrainian 8th Army Corps.

== History ==
The 8th Mechanised Army was initially formed on 12 June 1946 with its headquarters at Zhytomyr in the Carpathian Military District, under the command of Nikolay Pukhov. The army was formed from the headquarters of the 52nd Army. It initially comprised the 18th, 23rd and 31st Tank Divisions (the former 18th Tank Corps, 23rd Tank Corps, 31st Tank Corps) and the 11th Guards and 32nd Guards Mechanised Divisions. The army also included the 28th Anti-Aircraft Artillery Division, 12th Light Artillery Brigade, 45th Separate Tank Training Regiment, 9th Separate Motorcycle Regiment, 329th Separate Guards Mortar Regiment, 4th Separate Pontoon Bridge Regiment, and the 60th Separate Communications Regiment. Several units of the army used the T-44, the successor of the T-34.On 30 April 1947 the 18th Tank Division, 28th Anti-Aircraft Artillery Division, 12th Light Artillery Brigade, 329th Separate Guards Mortar Regiment and the 4th Separate Pontoon Bridge Regiment were disbanded. The 45th Tank Training Regiment moved to Turkestan, becoming part of the 344th Rifle Division. The 9th Motorcycle Regiment became the 200th Motorcycle Battalion.

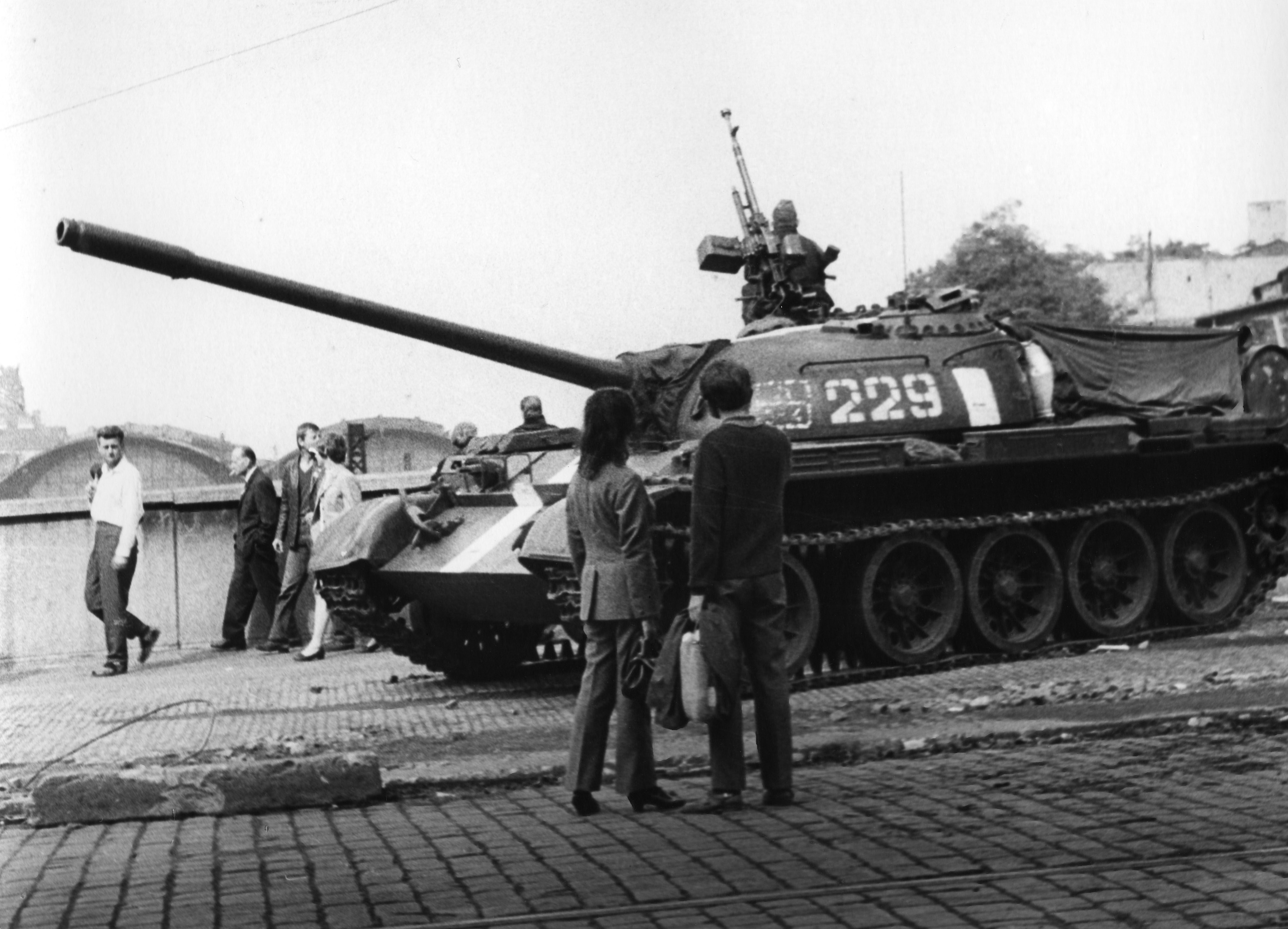
A T-55 during Operation Danube

Hamazasp Babadzhanian became commander of the army on 30 May 1956. During Operation Whirlwind in October and November 1956, the army headquarters was moved to Debrecen, and its troops occupied the eastern part of Hungary on the left bank of the Danube. The 70th Guards Rifle Division was attached to the army for the operation. On 1 May 1957 the army became the 8th Tank Army. A month later, the 32nd Guards Mechanized Division became the 41st Guards Tank Division at Berdychiv. Around this time the 11th Guards Mechanized Division became the 30th Guards Tank Division at Novohrad-Volynskyi. The 23rd Tank Division was stationed at Ovruch, and the 31st Tank Division at Ternopil, later moving to Zhytomyr. On 1 October 1960 the 41st Guards Tank Division became a training unit and was directly subordinated to the Carpathian Military District. The army and its 31st Tank Division fought in Operation Danube in 1968. The 8th Tank Army was subordinated to the Carpathian Front during the operation and was moved to southern Poland. After the end of the Prague Spring the 31st Tank Division remained in Czechoslovakia with the Central Group of Forces. The division's place was taken by the mobilization 50th Tank Division. From then on the army had only the 23rd and 30th Guards Tank Divisions, and the mobilization 50th Tank Division. On 15 January 1974 the army received the Order of the Red Banner.

The 50th Tank Division was reorganized into the 686th Territorial Training Center on 1 December 1987. On 21 March 1989 the 199th Guards Rocket Brigade became part of the army after arriving from Belarus. On 1 July 1989 the 686th Territorial Training Center became the 5358th Weapons and Equipment Storage Base. On 1 July 1990 the 23rd Tank Division became the 6065th Weapons and Equipment Storage Base. By the end of 1990, the army was essentially composed of only the 30th Guards Tank Division. Stationed in Ukraine, after dissolution of the Soviet Union the army was reorganized as Ukrainian military formation 8th Army Corps on 1 December 1993, whilst commanded by Lieutenant General Aleksey Mikhaylovich Torshin.

== Commanders ==
The following officers commanded the 8th Tank Army.

Appointed	Commander
12 June 1946	Colonel General Nikolay Pukhov
11 February 1948	Lieutenant General Ivan Korchagin
15 September 1950	Lieutenant General Alexei Burdeinei
25 November 1953	Lieutenant General Dmitry Lelyushenko
30 May 1956	Lieutenant General Hamazasp Babadzhanian
27 February 1958	Lieutenant General Pyotr Belik
23 May 1960	Lieutenant General Vasily Bisyarin
9 December 1964	Lieutenant General Viktor Kotov
31 January 1967	Lieutenant General Viktor Merimsky
16 December 1969	Lieutenant General Alexey Yamshchikov
24 May 1972	Lieutenant General Vladimir Ivanov
4 December 1975	Lieutenant General Nikolay Mokropolov
January 1979	Major General Vladimir Shuralyov
July 1980	Lieutenant General Sergey Surodeyev
July 1983	Major General Valentin Sadovnikov
July 1985	Lieutenant General Anatoly Golovnyov
August 1988	Lieutenant General Leonid Zolotov
May 1990	Lieutenant General Alexey Torshin

== Composition ==
The 8th Tank Army included the following units at the end of the 1980s.

- 103rd Separate Protection and Enforcement Company (Zhytomyr)
- 93rd Separate Communications Regiment (Zhytomyr)
- 664th Separate Radio Relay-Cable Battalion (Zhytomyr)
- 347th Communications Center (Zhytomyr)
- 54th Separate Radio Engineering Battalion PVO (Zhytomyr)
- 983rd Separate Electronic Warfare Battalion (Zhytomyr)
- 1803rd Separate Rear Battalion (Zhytomyr)
- 88th Material Security Brigade (Zhytomyr)
- 1156th Separate Air Assault Battalion (Novohrad-Volynskyi)
- 199th Guards Rocket Brigade (Novohrad-Volynskyi)
- 404th Artillery Brigade (Mobilization) (Novohrad-Volynskyi)
- 1196th Reactive Artillery Regiment (Novohrad-Volynskyi)
- 1591st Separate Engineering Road-Building Battalion (Novohrad-Volynskyi)
- 144th Separate Chemical Defense Battalion (Novohrad-Volynskyi)
- Separate Spetsnaz GRU Company (Verkhniye Pechi)
- 177th Rocket Brigade (Yemilchyne)
- 138th Anti-Aircraft Rocket Brigade (Shepetivka)
- 441st Separate Helicopter Regiment/Command and Control (Korosten)
- 513th Separate Combat Helicopter Regiment (Sovetskoye)
- 532nd Separate Pontoon Bridge Battalion (Radomyshl)
- 23rd Tank Division (Ovruch)
- 30th Guards Tank Division (Novohrad-Volynskyi)
- 50th Tank Division (Mobilization) (Zhytomyr)
