= Skorodnoye =

Skorodnoye Скородное
- Selo
- Location within Belgorod Oblast Location within Russia
- Coordinates: 51°04′N 37°14′E
- Country: Russia
- Region: Belgorod Oblast
- District: Gubkinsky District
- Time zone: UTC+3:00

Skorodnoye (Russian: Скородное) is a rural locality (a selo) and the administrative center of Skorodnyanskaya Territorial Administration, Gubkinsky District, Belgorod Oblast, Russia. The population was 3,707 as of 2010. There are 22 streets.

== Geography ==
Skorodnoye is located 39 km southwest of Gubkin (the district's administrative centre) by road. Korenek is the nearest rural locality.
