= Carpathian Military District =

Carpathian Military District ПрикВО / PrikVO
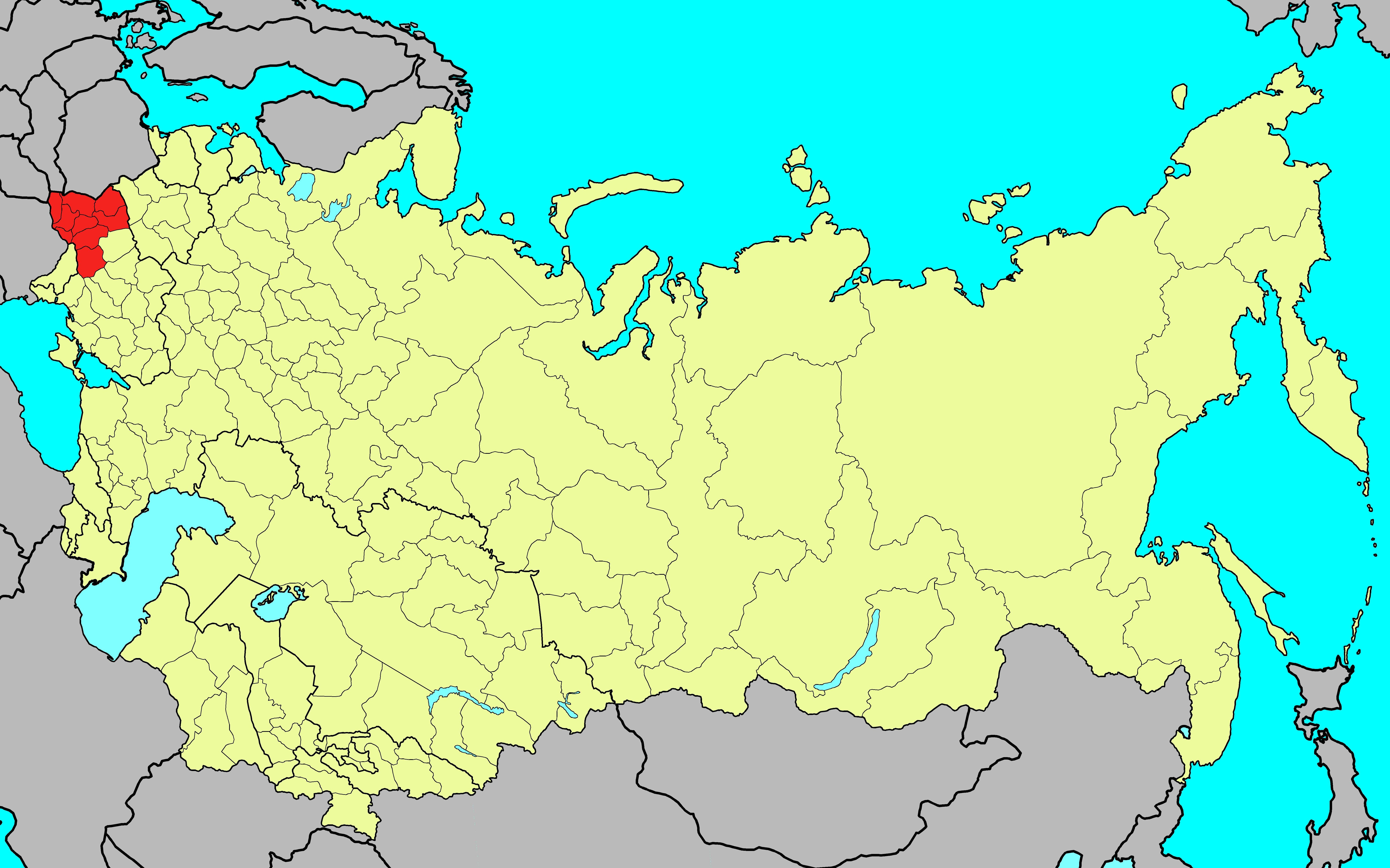
- Location of the district in the Soviet Union
- Active: 3 May 1946 – January 1998
- Country: Soviet Union (to 1992); Ukraine (1992–1998)
- Type: Military district
- HQ: Lviv
- Engagements: Hungarian Uprising; Operation Danube
- Decorations: Order of the Red Banner

Commanders
- Notable commanders: Andrey Yeryomenko; Kuzma Galitsky; Ivan Konev; Pavel Batov; Andrei Getman; Gennady Obaturov; Valentin Varennikov

The Red Banner Carpathian Military District (Russian: Краснознамённый Прикарпатский военный округ, romanized: Krasnoznamyonniy Prikarpatskiy voyénnyy ókrug, Ukrainian: Червонопрапорний Прикарпатський військовий округ, romanized: Chervonoprapornyi Prykarpatskyi viyskovyi okruh) was a military district of the Soviet Armed Forces during the Cold War and subsequently of the Armed Forces of Ukraine during the early Post-Soviet period.

It was established on 3 May 1946 on the base of the 1st Ukrainian Front, 4th Ukrainian Front, and Lviv Military District. It became part of the Armed Forces of Ukraine in 1991 and was disbanded by being redesignated the Western Operational Command in January 1998.

== History ==
Two districts were formed in what was to become the district's territory in 1944 and 1945. During May 1944 in the freed territory of the West Ukraine the Lvov Military District was formed, headed by the former deputy commander of the 2nd Ukrainian Front. On 9 July 1945 the Carpathian Military District (PrikVO) was ordered created from the headquarters of the 4th Ukrainian Front in Chernovtsy. under the command of former front commander Army General Andrey Yeryomenko. It was responsible for troops on the territory of Stanislav, Ternopol, Chernovtsy, Vinnitsa, Zakarpattia, and Kamenets-Podolsk Oblasts, excluding Berezdovsky, Polonsky, Shepetovsky, Isyaslavsky, and Slavutsky Districts.

The district's troops were mainly from the 4th Ukrainian Front, but also included units transferred from the Lvov and Kiev Military Districts. By the fall of 1945, the district included the 27th and 38th Armies, transferred from the Southern and Central Groups of Forces, respectively. The 35th Guards, 33rd, and 37th Rifle Corps were directly subordinated to the district headquarters when 27th Army disbanded around this time. On 8 September the 133rd Rifle Corps at Stanislav was disbanded with its two divisions. The 31st Tank Division (the former 31st Tank Corps) was also directly subordinated to the district at Proskurov.

By a decree of the Council of Ministers of the Soviet Union on 3 May 1946, the Lvov and Carpathian Military Districts were merged as the Carpathian Military District with headquarters at Lvov. The District's territory included 10 regions of the Ukrainian SSR – Vinnytsia, Volyn, Zhitomir, Zakarpattia, Stanislav (Ivano-Frankivsk from 1962), Lvov, Rovno, Kamenets-Podolsk (Khmelnitsky from 1954), Ternopol, and Chernovtsy. Simultaneously, the 52nd Army began reorganizing on the district's territory as the 8th Mechanized Army. The newly created district included the 13th and 38th Armies, with air support provided by the 14th Air Army. The 13th and 38th Armies totalled five rifle corps headquarters and seventeen divisions (one tank, five mechanized, one cavalry, two mountain rifle, and eight rifle) between them.

In 1947, the 50th, 280th, and 395th Rifle, 18th Tank, and the 23rd and 25th Mechanized Divisions were disbanded. The 3rd Mountain Rifle Corps was in the Lvov Military District in September 1945. It became part of the 38th Army in the Carpathian Military District, but disbanded by 1957.

Troops of the district, including 57th Air Army, took part in 'Operation Danube,' the 1968 Warsaw Pact invasion of Czechoslovakia. Defector Vladimir Rezun ("Viktor Suvorov") detailed the disorganization the resulting mobilisation caused in his book The Liberators (1981). The District became subordinate to the Western Strategic Direction in the late 1970s/early 80s. The 8th Tank (formed from 8th Mechanised Army in 1957, which in its turn was formed from the 52nd Army in 1946), 13th, and 38th Armies were stationed in the District for most of its existence. The 14th Air Army and 2nd Army of the Soviet Air Defence Forces were also located there. Scott and Scott reported the HQ address in 1979 as Lviv-8, Vulytsa Vatutina, Bud 12.

On 1 September 1990, the 66th Artillery Corps was formed in Novye Belokorovichi, Zhitomir Oblast, from parts of the disbanded HQ 50th Rocket Division, 43rd Rocket Army. This was the first artillery corps, an experiment, formed since the post-World War II demobilization. It took under command the pre-existing 26th and 81st Artillery Divisions, the 188th heavy howitzer artillery brigade, the 980th anti-tank and 440th reconnaissance artillery regiments and the 1596th property storage base (artillery), the former 72nd Artillery Division (cadre).

After the dissolution of the Soviet Union, President of Ukraine Leonid Kravchuk appointed Lieutenant General Petro Ivanovich Shulyak, former commander of the 13th Army, as commander of the district on April 7, 1994, in Presidential Ukaz N 143/94.

Former Soviet and Western sources agree on an end-1980s figure of three tank divisions and nine or ten motor rifle divisions in the District. In its last years under Ukrainian control the District saw a large reduction in the number of troops within it as Ukraine reduced the 780,000 troops it had inherited from the Soviet Union to comply with the treaty on Conventional Armed Forces in Europe.

== Order of battle c.1988 ==
The District's forces at the end of the 1980s included:

- 8th Tank Army (Zhytomyr) - Redesignated 8th Army Corps (Ukraine) 1 December 1993
  - 23rd Tank Division (V/Ch 18876) (Ovruch), from 23rd Tank Corps 1945; 39th, 84th, 135th Tank Regiments; 1990 converted into 6065th Weapons and Equipment Storage Base.
  - 30th Guards Tank Division (Novograd-Volynsky) (now 30th Mechanized Brigade (Ukraine))
- 13th Red Banner Army (Rivne)
  - 51st Guards Motor Rifle Division (Volodymyr-Volynskyi)
  - 97th Guards Motor Rifle Division (Slavuta)
  - 161st Motor Rifle Division (Izyaslav)
- 38th Army (Ivano-Frankivsk)
  - 17th Guards Motor Rifle Division (Khmelnitsky) (to 13th Army 1990)
  - 70th Guards Motor Rifle Division (Ivano-Frankivsk). Redesignated 857th Weapons and Equipment Storage Base January 1991.
  - 128th Guards Motor Rifle Division (Mukachevo)
- District Troops
  - 26th Artillery Division (Ternopil) ('26th-Stettin Sivashskaya twice Red Banner Order of Suvorov Artillery Division')
    - Included 897th Guards Gun Artillery Kiev Red Banner order of Bogdan Khmelnytsky Regiment, now the 11th Artillery Brigade
  - 81st Artillery Division (Vynohradiv)
  - 24th Motor Rifle Division (Yavoriv)
  - 66th Guards Training Motor Rifle Division (Chernivtsi)
    - 128th Guards Tank Training Regiment, 145th, 193rd, 195th Guards Motor Rifle Training Regiments
  - 117th Guards Tank Training Division (Berdychiv)
    - 242nd (Zhitomir), 254th, 286th Tank Training Regiments, 320th Guards Motor Rifle Training Regiment. Division later became the 119th Guards District Training Centre. 242nd Tank Training Regiment later became the 95th Airmobile Brigade.
  - 8th Spetsnaz Brigade (Soviet Union) (formed Izyaslav, Khmelnitskiy Oblast, Carpathian Military District, December 1962, to Armed Forces of Ukraine). (See interwiki uk:8-ма_окрема_бригада_спеціального_призначення_(СРСР))
  - 39th Air Assault Brigade (Khyriv)
  - 61st Anti-Aircraft Rocket Artillery Division (Mobilization) (Dzigovtsy) - Became 4600th Weapons and Equipment Storage Base 1989.
  - 62nd Reserve Tank Division (Mobilization) (Berdychiv)
  - 72nd Artillery Division (Mobilization) - Became 701st Territorial Training Center 1 December 1987, 1586th Weapons and Equipment Storage Base 31 December 1989.
  - 119th Anti-Aircraft Rocket Artillery Division (Mobilization) (Zhytomyr) - Became 4603rd Weapons and Equipment Storage Base 1989.
  - 168th Motor Rifle Division (Mobilization) (Berdychiv) - Became 1950th Weapons and Equipment Storage Base 1989.
  - 232nd Rear Protection Division (Mobilization) (Slavuta)
  - 233rd Rear Protection Division (Mobilization) (Khmelnytskyi)
  - 251st Reserve Motor Rifle Division (Mobilization) (Chernivtsi)

== Commanders since World War II ==
=== Lvov Military District ===
- Lieutenant General Ilya Smirnov (May 1944 - July 1945)
- Colonel-General Markian Popov (July 1945 - May 1946)

=== Carpathian Military District ===
The Carpathian Military District's commanders included:

- General of the Army Andrey Yeryomenko (September 1945-October 1946),
- Colonel General Kuzma Galitsky (October 1946-November 1951),
- Marshal of the Soviet Union Ivan Konev (November 1951-March 1955),
- General of the Army Pavel Batov (1955–1958)
- General of the Army Andrei Getman (1958–1964),
- Colonel General Pyotr Lashchenko (1964–1967),
- Colonel General Vasily Bisyarin (1967–1969),
- Colonel General Gennady Obaturov (01 1970-07 1973),
- General of the Army Valentin Varennikov (07 1973-08 1979),
- General of the Army Valery Belikov (08 1979-07 1986),
- Colonel General Viktor V. Skokov (07 1986-28 January 1992)

=== Ukraine ===
- Lieutenant General Valeriy Stepanov (28 January–September 1992)
- Colonel General Vasyl Sobkov (September 1992–June 1994)
- Colonel General Petro Shulyak (June 1994–February 1998)

== District Museum ==
The Museum of the History of the Troops of the Carpathian Military District (Ukrainian: Музей історії військ Прикарпатського військового округу) is a military history museum in Lviv depicting the history of the district. It is located on Stryjska Street on the territory of the 24th Mechanized Brigade. The museum was inaugurated on 7 May 1965 on the eve of the celebration of the 20th anniversary of the victory in the Second World War. It was created on the basis of the Museum of the Great Patriotic War. In 1995, due to lack of funds for the maintenance of the museum, the district authorities made the decision to put it up for sale. In 1999, a multi-story hotel was planned to be built there, but during the excavation work, human bones were found by excavator, which resulted in the ceasing of construction at the request of members of the Lviv City Council. Lieutenant General Shulyak decided to transfer the funds of the former museum to the premises of the Iron Division Museum, located on the territory of the 7th Regiment of the 24th Mechanized Brigade. The task of creating a new museum was assigned to Lieutenant Colonel Alexander Rogozhin, with the process taking up 3 months in early 1996.

== Sports ==
- SKA Lviv
