= Regional Directorate of the Territorial Defense Forces "East" =

- Регіональне управління Сил територіальної оборони «Схід»
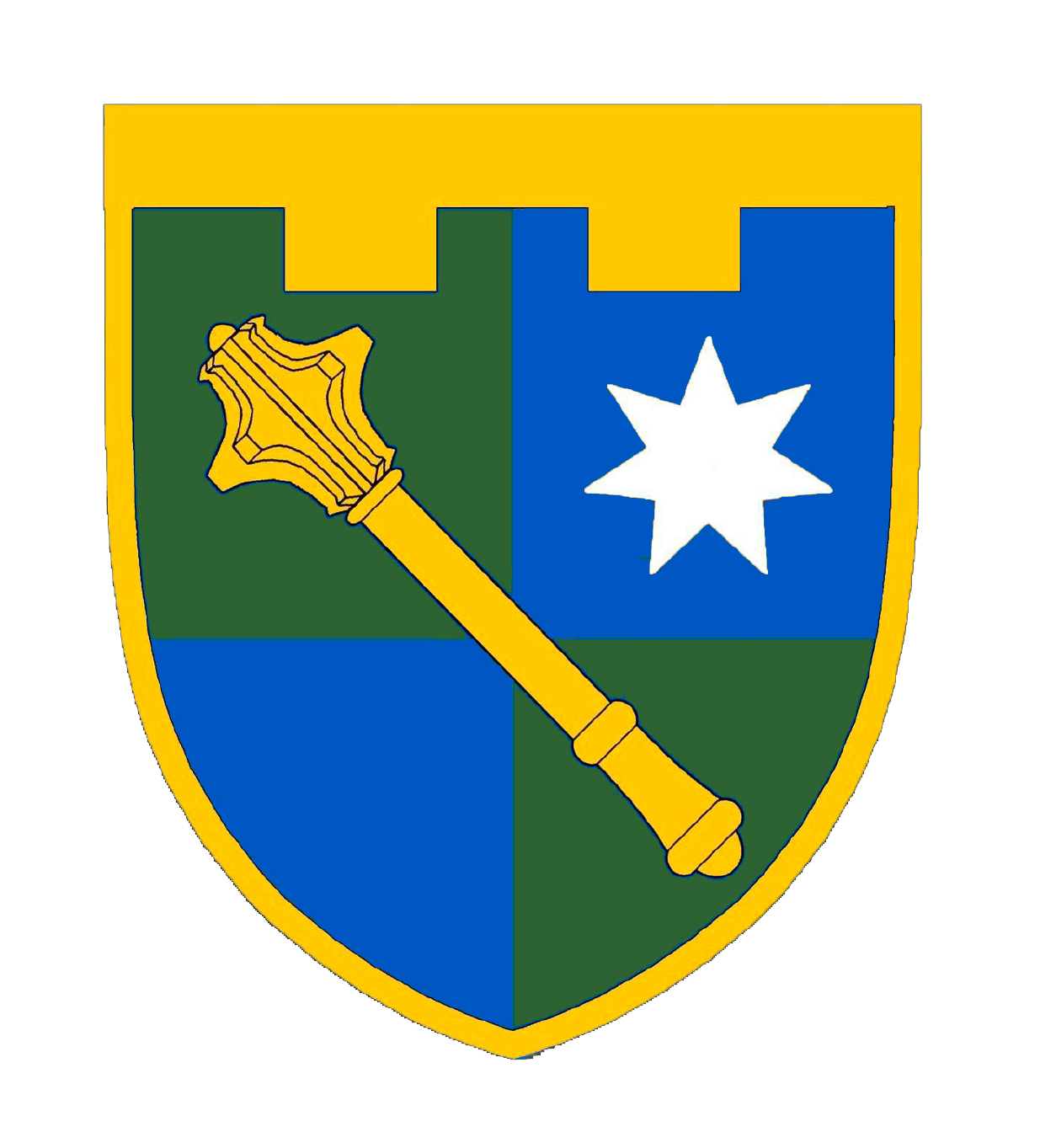
- Sleeve insignia
- Active: 15 January 2022 – present
- Country: Ukraine
- Allegiance: Armed Forces of Ukraine
- Branch: Territorial Defense Forces
- Type: Light infantry
- Role: Territorial defense
- Part of: Territorial Defense Forces of Ukraine
- Headquarters: Dnipro, Dnipropetrovsk Oblast
- Motto: «Схід б'ється!» ("East fights!")
- Engagements: Russian invasion of Ukraine (2022–present)
- Website: tro.mil.gov.ua

Commanders
- Head of the Regional Directorate: Major General Vasyl Osypchuk

The Regional Management of the Territorial Defense Forces “East” (Ukrainian: Регіональне управління Сил територіальної оборони «Схід», abbreviated РУ Сил ТрО «Схід’) is a regional body of military management of the Territorial Defense Forces of the Armed Forces of Ukraine. It is responsible for organizing and carrying out territorial defense tasks in the eastern military-land zone of Ukraine (Dnipropetrovsk, Kharkiv, Zaporizhzhia, Luhansk, and Donetsk oblasts).<

== Tasks ==
The Regional Management is assigned the following tasks:

- Timely response and necessary measures for the defense of territory and protection of the population in a designated area until the deployment of regular forces.
- Participation in strengthening the protection and defence of the state border.
- Participation in the protection of the population, territories, natural environment, and property from emergency situations, and in the elimination of the consequences of military operations.
- Participation in preparing Ukrainian citizens for national resistance.
- Participation in ensuring conditions for the safe functioning of state authorities, local self-government bodies, and military management bodies.
- Participation in the protection and defence of important facilities, communications, and critically important infrastructure.
- Ensuring conditions for the strategic or operational deployment or regrouping of troops.
- Participation in temporary restrictions on movement near emergency or combat zones.
- Participation in ensuring public safety and order in settlements.
- Participation in the implementation of martial law measures.
- Participation in the fight against sabotage and reconnaissance forces and other illegal armed formations.
- Participation in information measures aimed at increasing defence capability and countering enemy information operations.

== History ==
=== Formation ===
On 1 January 2022, pursuant to the Law of Ukraine “On the Fundamentals of National Resistance” (No. 1702-IX), territorial defence was separated from the Ground Forces and established as a distinct branch of the Armed Forces of Ukraine.

The Regional Management of the Territorial Defense Forces “East” was formed on 15 January 2022, with its headquarters in Dnipro.

=== Russian invasion of Ukraine ===
Following the full-scale Russian invasion that began on 24 February 2022, the Territorial Defense Forces expanded rapidly. By late February, approximately 37,000 reservists had joined; by early March the number reached about 100,000, and by May it stood at around 110,000–120,000 personnel nationwide.

== Structure ==
The Regional Management oversees several territorial defense brigades in the eastern zone, including:

- 108th Territorial Defense Brigade (Dnipropetrovsk Oblast)
- 109th Territorial Defense Brigade (Donetsk Oblast)
- 110th Territorial Defense Brigade (Zaporizhzhia Oblast)
- 111th Territorial Defense Brigade (Luhansk Oblast)
- 113th Territorial Defense Brigade (Kharkiv Oblast)
- 127th Separate Territorial Defense Brigade (Kharkiv)
- 128th Separate Territorial Defense Brigade (Dnipro)
- 129th Separate Territorial Defense Brigade (Kryvyi Rih)

Additional subordinate elements reported in open sources include a tactical group (Group Druzhkivka), a guard battalion, the East Territorial Defense Battalion (A4458), and training or support units.

== Leadership ==
Heads of the Regional Management:

- January 2022 – November 2022: Colonel Valerii Kurach
- November 2022 – November 2023: Colonel Oleksandr Zugravyi
- November 2023 – present: Major General Vasyl Osypchuk

Direct overall leadership of the Territorial Defense Forces is exercised by the Commander-in-Chief of the Armed Forces of Ukraine through the Commander of the Territorial Defense Forces. Within each military-land zone, authority is exercised by the respective regional management.

== Insignia ==
The sleeve insignia consists of a heraldic shield with a golden crenelated chief and border, quartered green (olive) and blue, charged with a golden Bulava (mace) placed as a diagonal bend and a silver seven-pointed star.

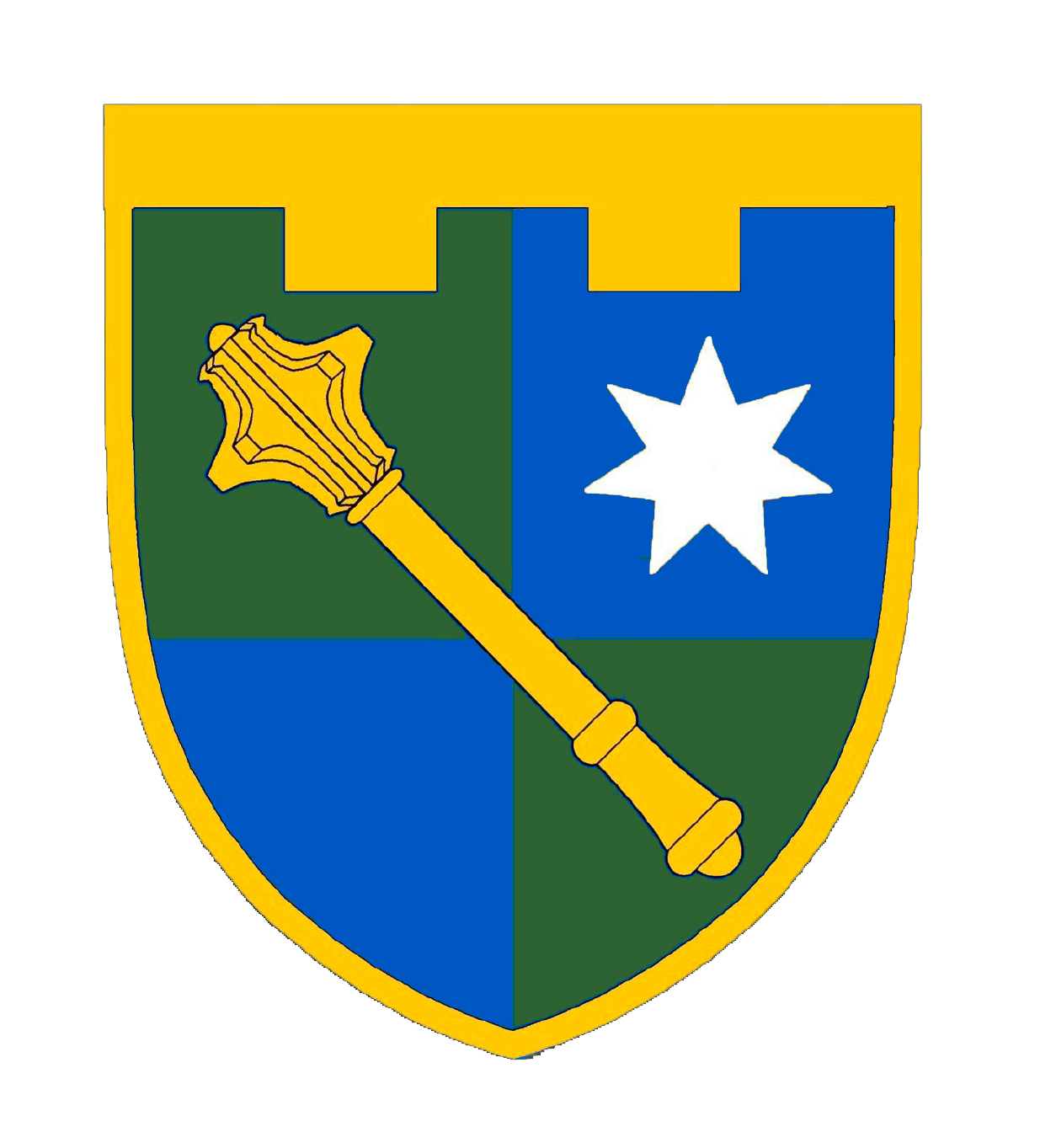
Sleeve insignia of the Regional Management of the Territorial Defense Forces "East"
