= Sumy operational-tactical group =

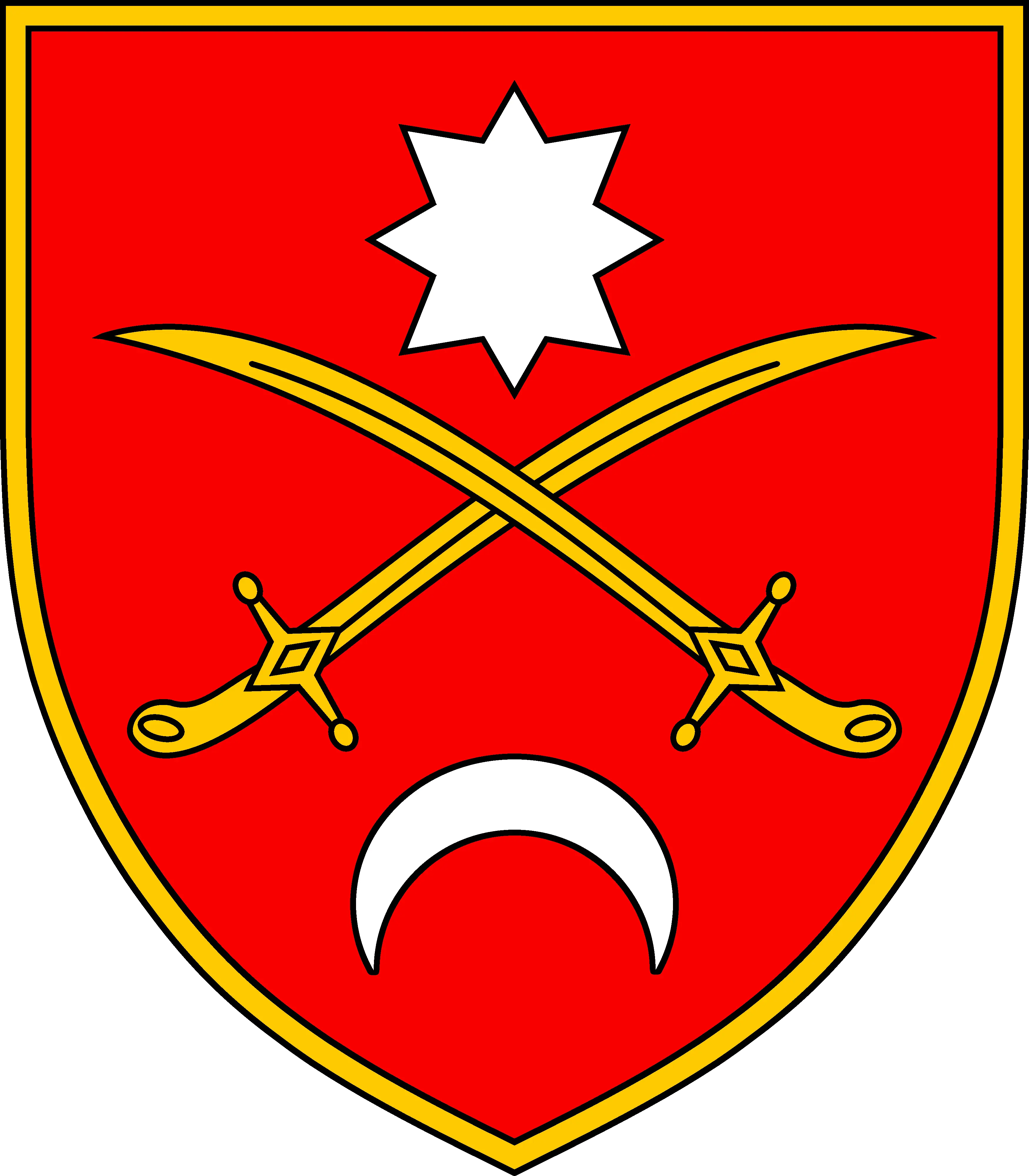
- Patch of Sumy OTG
- Active: 2022–2024
- Disbanded: 2024
- Country: Ukraine
- Branch: Ukrainian Ground Forces
- Type: Regional command
- Garrison/HQ: Sumy
- Engagements: Russian Invasion of Ukraine

Commanders
- Current commander: Major General Oleksiy Otserklevych

The Sumy operational-tactical group, or Sumy operations group, was a formation of the Ukrainian Ground Forces in Ukraine. Its headquarters is located in Sumy, and is responsible for the defense of Sumy Oblast, Poltava Oblast, Cherkasy Oblast, and parts of Kharkiv Oblast. Its commander in 2022-2023 was Major General Oleksandr Nesterenko while formed in April 2022 after Russian invasion of Ukraine.

== History ==
When the 2022 invasion of Ukraine by Russia commenced, the Ukrainian city of Sumy was only defended by one airmobile platoon. As a result, civilians took up arms from an army warehouse and defended the city for weeks as the Sumy territorial defense forces. Once the Ukrainian Army advanced with two separate battalions along the border of Chernihiv Oblast and Sumy Oblast, they received a directive to create the Sumy tactical group which was disbanded and reformed on April 14, 2022 as the Sumy operational-tactical group by order of the Ukrainian command. Since then, the Sumy operational-tactical group has been training and creating volunteer formations, while establishing further defenses.

== Structure ==
The Sumy operational-tactical group has operational command of regional ground force units in Sumy, Poltava, Cherkasy, and parts of Kharkiv. The tactical group includes territorial defense brigades, rifle battalions, and other units of the Ukrainian Armed Forces alongside units of the State Border Guard Service, National Police, special security services, and volunteer formations and operate as one formation.

- Sumy Operational-Tactical Group, Sumy
  - 15th Separate Rifle Battalion
  - 116th Territorial Defense Brigade
  - 117th Territorial Defense Brigade
    - 150th Separate Infantry Battalion
  - State Border Guard units
  - National Police units
  - Special security service units

== Commanders ==
- Major General Oleksandr Nesterenko (April 2022–2023)
- 2023: Lieutenant General Volodymyr Kravchenko
- 02.2023—11.2023: Major General Vasyl Osypchuk
