= 20th Army Corps (Ukraine) =

Ukrainian Ground Forces formation

- 20-й армійський корпус
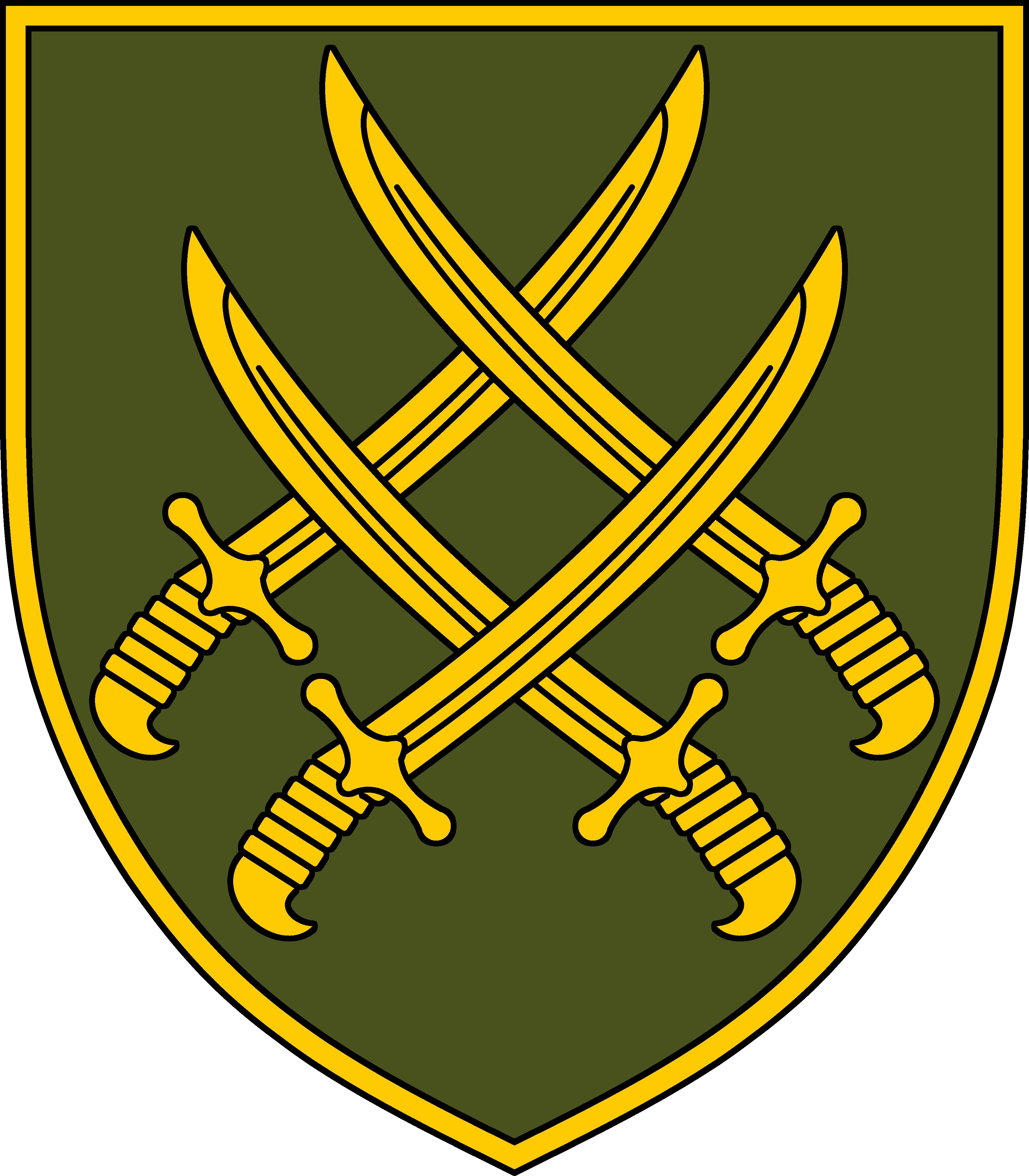
- Insignia of the corps
- Active: 2025
- Country: Ukraine
- Branch: Ukrainian Ground Forces
- Size: Corps
- Part of: Khortytsia operational-strategic group
- Engagements: Russo-Ukrainian War
- Website: Official Facebook page

Commanders
- Current commander: Oleksandr Kursukov
- Notable commanders: Maksym Kituhin (until September 2025)

The 20th Army Corps (Ukrainian: 20-й армійський корпус) is a Corps of the Ukrainian Ground Forces.

== History ==
The 20th Army Corps is a military unit formed as part of Ukraine's ongoing defense reforms. These reforms aim to improve command structures and operational readiness amid ongoing conflicts.

In July and August 2025, it was reported that units of the 20th Army Corps were responsible for a section of the front line from the area south of the city of Pokrovsk in the Donetsk region up to the border of the Zaporizhzhia region with the Donetsk region. In late July 2025, the corps issued statements denying that it had lost the settlements of Temyrivka and Maliivka, claiming that they were still held by its 110th and 31st Brigades, respectively. In September 2025, corps commander Maksym Kituhin was removed from his post for the loss of positions in the corps' area of responsibility.

== Structure ==
As of 2026 the corps structure is as follows:

- 20th Army Corps
  - Corps
    - Management
    - Commandant Platoon
  - 13th Air Defense Command Post
  - 17th Heavy Mechanized Brigade
  - 23rd Mechanized Brigade
  - 23rd Reconnaissance Battalion
  - 31st Mechanized Brigade
  - 33rd Mechanized Brigade
  - 60th Artillery Brigade
  - 92nd Assault Brigade
  - 98th Anti-Tank Battalion
  - 128th Material Battalion
  - 141st Mechanized Brigade
  - 260th Territorial Defense Brigade
  - 423rd Unmanned Systems Battalion
  - 533rd Security and Maintenance Battalion
  - 1201st Anti-Aircraft Missile Battalion
  - 1226th Support Battalion
