= Oleksiy Shandar =

Ukrainian military personnel (born 1973)

- Олексій Михайлович Шандар
- Born: Oleksiy Mykhailovych Shandar; 5 February 1973 (age 53); Cherkasy, Ukraine, Soviet Union
- Military career
- Allegiance: Ukraine
- Branch: Ukrainian Ground Forces
- Rank: Brigadier general
- Commands: Operational Command North
- Conflicts: Russo-Ukrainian War

Oleksiy Mykhailovych Shandar (Ukrainian: Олексій Михайлович Шандар; born on 5 February 1973), is a Ukrainian army officer who is currently the Commander of the Operational Command North since 12 March 2025.

He had been the first deputy commander of the Ukrainian Armed Forces, had was the commander of the 79th separate airmobile brigade, Mykolaiv from 2012 to 2016.

== Biography ==
Oleksiy Shandar was born in Cherkasy on 5 February 1973.

During the Russian invasion of Crimea, he was with the brigade in Chongar.

On 8 September 2014, for personal courage and heroism shown in the defense of the state sovereignty and territorial integrity of Ukraine, and his loyalty to the military oath during the Russian-Ukrainian war, he was awarded the Order of Bohdan Khmelnytsky III degree.

On 21 August 2019, he was appointed as the First Deputy Commander of the Airborne Assault Forces of the Armed Forces of Ukraine.

On 5 December 2020, he was awarded the rank of brigadier general by decree of the President of Ukraine, Volodymyr Zelenskyi.

On 12 March 2025, Shandar was appointed as the new commander of the Operational Command North, replacing Dmytro Krasilnikov.
