= Oleksandr Krasanook =

Ukrainian army officer (born 1966)

- Олександр Федорович Красноок
- Born: Oleksandr Fedorovych Krasanook; 15 January 1966 (age 60); Kryvyi Rih, Ukraine, Soviet Union
- Military career
- Allegiance: Ukraine
- Branch: Ukrainian Ground Forces
- Rank: Lieutenant General
- Commands: Operation Command East (2017–2019)
- Conflicts: Russo-Ukrainian War

Oleksandr Fedorovych Krasanook (Ukrainian: Олександр Федорович Красноок; born on 15 January 1966), is a Ukrainian army officer who had served as the Commander of the Operation Command East from 2017 to 2019.

== Biography ==
Oleksandr Krasanook was born in Kryvyi Rih on 15 January 1966.

In 2017, he was appointed commander of the Operation Command East. In October 2018, Krasnook had earned his promotion as a lieutenant general.

On 18 July 2019, he was replaced by Oleksandr Nesterenko.

As of March 2022, he is currently the deputy head of the Kryvyi Rih Military Administration.
