= Operational Command North =

- Оперативне командування «Північ»
- Operation Command North sleeve patch
- Active: 1996–present
- Country: Ukraine
- Branch: Ukrainian Ground Forces
- Type: Military district
- Role: administrative control
- Part of: Armed Forces of Ukraine
- Garrison/HQ: Chernihiv
- Anniversaries: 15 August

Commanders
- Current commander: Dmytro Krasylnykov

The Operational Command North (Ukrainian: Оперативне командування "Північ") is a command of the Ukrainian Ground Forces in northern Ukraine. It was formed in 2013 from the Operational Command West and Territorial Directorate North by reforming the 13th Army Corps.

The operation command traces its history back to Territorial Directorate "North", which was created on the basis of Northern Territorial Operational Command by Directive No.322/1/010 of the Minister of Defence of Ukraine on 20 May 2005.

The previous Northern Operational Command was created in 1996 and based on the 1st Army Corps that continued the traditions of the 1st Guard Red-Banner Army. It encompassed six oblasts: Poltava, Sumy, Kyiv, Zhytomyr, Chernihiv, and Cherkasy. The command consisted of units and military formations of the 8th Army Corps.

On 15 August 2005, temporary Chief of the Directorate Colonel Yuriy Horoliuk signed the first Order within the Directive. This day is considered the creation date for the Directorate. The Territorial Directorate "North" was the first to switch to a new system of control.

== History ==
Map of the Operational Command North shown in dark green

When Ukraine gained independence, the 1st Guards Army was stationed on Ukrainian territory with its headquarters at Chernihiv. During the early 1990s, the army was reformed into the 1st Army Corps. In 1996, the Northern Operational and Territorial Command was formed from the corps. At the beginning of 1998, the command was split into the Northern Operational Command, managing operations in the area. The Northern Territorial Command controlled other functions. In August 2005, Territorial Directorate "North" was established from the Northern Operational Command.

The Directorate was responsible for territory spanning over 196,000 km^{2} (75,676 sq mi), in which 15,000,000 people lived in 2008. The oblasts (provinces) of Kharkiv, Poltava, Sumy, Kyiv, Zhytomyr, Chernihiv, and Cherkasy were all are under the Directorate control. The Directorate was in charge of the 7 oblasts and Kyiv City Military Commissariat, 135 regional military commissariats, 530 military units and bases. As of 2008, the mission of the directorate was to organize territorial defence, recruit conscripts and contract soldiers and manage infrastructure.

In November 2013, the directorate was reformed into Operational Command North. The command absorbed units of the disbanded 13th Army Corps.

== Organization ==
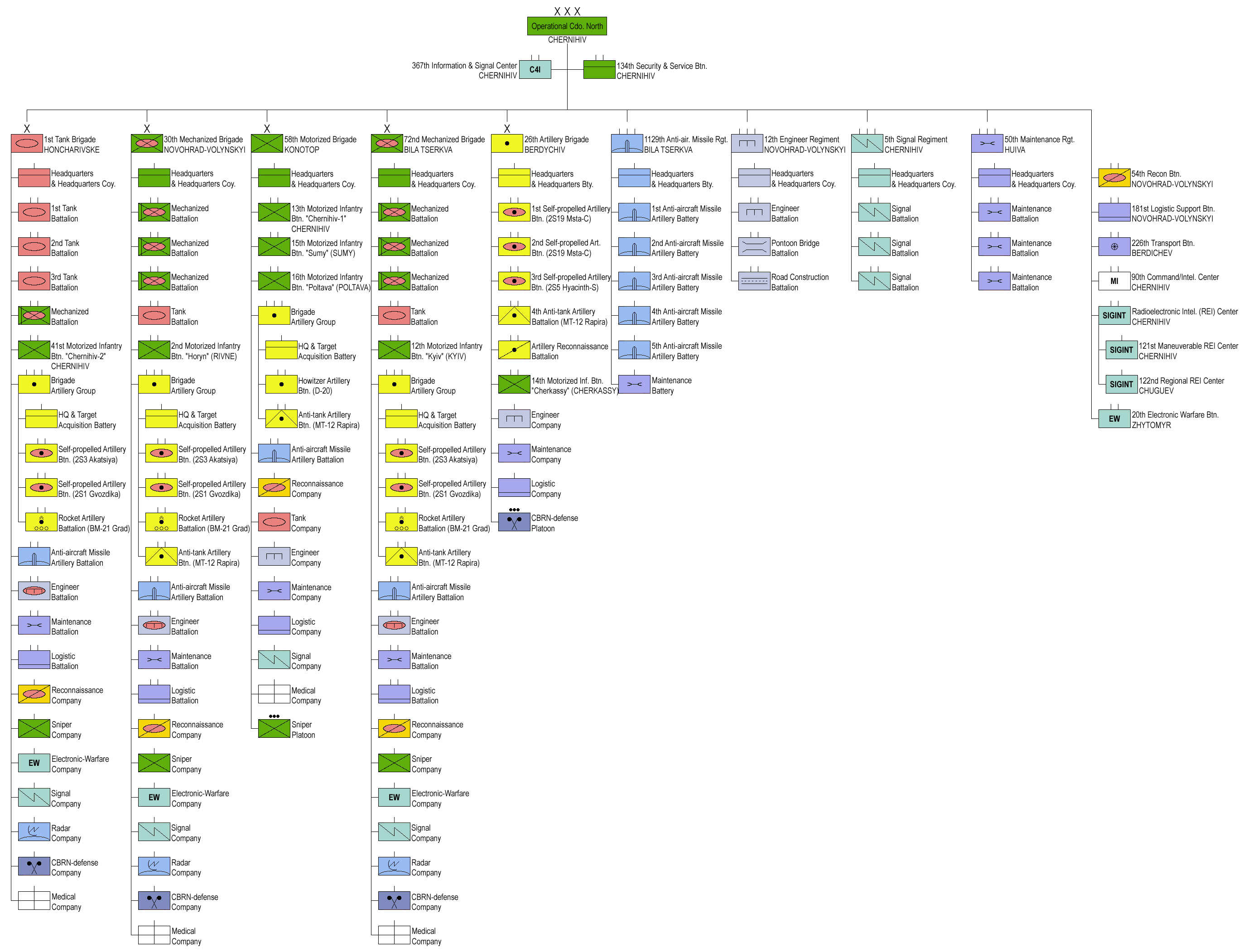
Structure of the Operational Command North in 2017 as per the best available Ukrainian language sources.

Operational Command North includes ground force units in Poltava, Sumy, Kyiv, Zhytomyr, Chernihiv, and Cherkasy oblasts, as well as in the city of Kyiv.

- Operational Command North, Chernihiv, unit number A4583.
  - 1st Heavy Mechanized Siver Brigade, Honcharivske, unit number A1815.
  - 4th Tank Brigade named after Hetman Ivan Vyhovskyi, Honcharivske, unit number A7015.
  - 30th Separate Mechanized Brigade named after Prince Konstantin Ostrozky, Zviahel, unit number А0409
  - 31st Separate Mechanized Brigade, Zhytomyr, unit number A4773
  - 32nd Separate Mechanized Brigade, unit number A4784
  - 44th Separate Mechanized Brigade, Nizhyn, unit number A4723
  - 47th Separate Mechanized Brigade "Magura", Kharkiv, unit number A4699
  - 58th Separate Motorized Infantry Brigade named after Hetman Ivan Vyhovskyi, Konotop, unit number A137
  - 72nd Separate Mechanized Brigade named after the Black Zaporozhians, Bila Tserkva, unit number A2167
  - 110th Separate Mechanized Brigade named after Marko Bezruchko, Cherkasy, unit number А4007
  - 115th Separate Mechanized Brigade, Blahodatne, unit number A4053
  - 26th Artillery Brigade named after Major General Roman Dashkevich, Berdychiv, unit number А3091
  - 48th Separate Artillery Brigade, Poltava
  - 49th Separate Artillery Brigade, Chernihiv, unit number A0157
  - 1020th Anti-aircraft Missile Regiment, Poltava, unit number A4647
  - 1129th Anti-aircraft Missile Regiment, Bila Tserkva, unit number A1232
  - 5th Signal Regiment, Chernihiv, unit number А2995
  - 12th Support Regiment, Zviahel, unit number А3814
  - 50th Maintenance Regiment, Huiva, unit number A1586
  - 12th Separate Tank Battalion, Honcharivske, unit number A0932
  - 20th Separate Electronic Warfare Battalion, Huiva, unit number A1262
  - 23rd Rifle Battalion, Kyiv, unit number A4438
  - 33rd Rifle Battalion, Putyvl, unit number A4026
  - 54th Separate Reconnaissance Battalion named after Mykhailo Tysha, Zviahel, unit number A2076
  - 60th Rifle Battalion, unit number A4459
  - 134th Security & Service Battalion, Chernihiv, unit number A1624
  - 181st Separate Material Support Battalion, Zviahel, unit number А2925
  - 211th Special Operations Battalion, Sumy, unit number А4270
  - 226th Transport Battalion, Berdychiv, unit number A2927
  - 376th Guards Battalion
  - 6th Combined Attack Drone Detachment "Vij", Kyiv, unit number A4583
  - 90th Command & Intelligence Center, in Chernihiv, unit number А1590
  - Regional Radioelectronic Intelligence (REI) Center, in Chernihiv, unit number A2622
    - 121st Maneuverable REI Center, Chernihiv, unit number A1783
    - 122nd REI Center, Chuhuiv, unit number A1993

=== Additional forces ===
The following formations of other branches of the Ukrainian Armed Forces, respectively the general staff of the Ukrainian ground forces, are based in the area of Operational Command North and can be assigned to the command as needed:

- 101st General Staff Guard Brigade, in Kyiv
- Ground Forces:
  - Presidential Brigade, in Kyiv
  - 3rd Assault Brigade, in Kyiv
  - 5th Assault Brigade, in Konotop
  - 18th Army Aviation Brigade, in Poltava
  - 27th Rocket Artillery Brigade, in Sumy
  - 43rd Artillery Brigade, in Pyriatyn
  - 107th Rocket Artillery Brigade, in Kremenchuk
  - 1121st Anti-Aircraft Missile Regiment (Training), in Desna
- Air Assault Forces:
  - 46th Airmobile Brigade, in Poltava
  - 71st Jaeger Brigade, in Kremenchuk
  - 77th Airmobile Brigade, in Zhytomyr
  - 91st Support Brigade, in Okhtyrka
  - 95th Air Assault Brigade, in Zhytomyr
  - 148th Artillery Brigade, in Zhytomyr
  - 132nd Intelligence Battalion, in Zhytomyr
  - 135th Command and Support Battalion, in Zhytomyr
  - 170th Logistic Battalion, in Zhytomyr
- Air Force:
  - 96th Anti-aircraft Missile Brigade, in Danylivka
  - 138th Radio Technical Brigade, in Vasylkiv
  - 156th Anti-aircraft Missile Regiment, in Zolotonosha
  - 210th Anti-Aircraft Missile Regiment, in Uman
  - 31st Communication Regiment, in Kyiv
  - 2204th Electronic Warfare Battalion, in Vasylkiv
- Special Operations Forces:
  - 99th Headquarters and Support Battalion, in Brovary
  - 16th Information and Psychological Operations Center, in Huiva
  - 72nd Information and Psychological Operations Center, in Brovary
  - 142nd Training and Education Center, in Berdychiv
- Territorial Defense Forces
  - 1st Special Purpose Brigade, in Kyiv
  - 112th Territorial Defence Brigade "City of Kyiv"
  - 114th Territorial Defence Brigade "Kyiv Oblast"
  - 115th Territorial Defence Brigade "Zhytomyr"
  - 116th Territorial Defence Brigade "Poltava"
  - 117th Territorial Defence Brigade "Sumy"
  - 118th Territorial Defence Brigade "Cherkasy"
  - 119th Territorial Defence Brigade "Chernihiv"
  - 241st Territorial Defence Brigade "Kyiv"
  - 4th Infantry Battalion "Zhytomyr"
  - 8th Infantry Battalion "Kyiv Oblast"
  - 13th Infantry Battalion "Poltava"
  - 15th Infantry Battalion "Sumy"
  - 20th Infantry Battalion "Cherkasy"
  - 22nd Infantry Battalion "Chernihiv"
  - Infantry Battalion "Kyiv City"

== Commanders ==
This table includes commanders of Northern Operational Command (1992–2005), Territorial Directorate "North" (2005–2013) and Operational Command North (2014–).

=== Commanders ===
- Lieutenant General Valentyn Boryskin (1992 - 1996)
- Colonel General Viktor Kolotov (1996 - 1998)
- Colonel General Oleh Shustenko (2000 - 2005)
- Colonel Yuriy Horolyuk (15 August 2005 - 2005)
- Major General Serhiy Bessarab (2005 - 2007)
- Major General Anatoliy Syrotenko (2007 - 2012)
- Lieutenant General Ihor Kolesnyk (November 2013 - 2015)
- Major General Oleksandr Lakota (2015 - February 2017)
- Lieutenant General Vyacheslav Nazarkin (February 2017 - 2017)
- Lieutenant General Volodymyr Kravchenko (2017 - 5 August 2019)
- Major General Vasyl Osypchuk (5 August 2019 - December 2019, acting)
- Lieutenant General Viktor Nikoliuk (December 2019 - March 2023)
- Brigadier General Dmytro Krasylnykov (March 2023 - 12 March 2025)
- Brigadier General Oleksiy Shandar (12 March 2025 - present)

=== Chiefs of staff - first deputy commanders ===
- Major General Volodymyr Kravchenko (2015 - 2017)
- Major General Petro Romyhailo (2017 - present)

=== Deputy commanders ===
- Major General Andriy Hryshchenko (2015 - 2016)
- Colonel Ihor Krasota (2016 - July 2018)
- Major General Vasyl Osypchuk (July 2018 - August 2019)
- Major General Oleksiy Otserklevych (2020 - present)

== See also ==
- Kyiv Military District
