= 241st Brigade =

241st Brigade may refer to:

- 241st Territorial Defense Brigade, Ukraine
- 241st Brigade, Royal Field Artillery, United Kingdom
