= Oleksandr Lokota =

Ukrainian military personnel

- Олександр Дмитрович Локота
- Born: Oleskandr Dmytrovich Lokota; 3 February 1961 (age 65); Soviet Union
- Military career
- Allegiance: Soviet Union; Ukraine
- Branch: Ukrainian Ground Forces
- Rank: Lieutenant general
- Commands: Operational Command North (2013 to 2017)

Lieutenant General Oleskandr Dmytrovich Lokota (Ukrainian: Олександр Дмитрович Локота; born on 3 February 1961), is a Ukrainian military officer, who had been the commander of the Operational Command North from 2013 to 2017. He is currently the head of the main department of defense and mobilization planning is the deputy chief of the General Staff of the Armed Forces of Ukraine. Lokota is a participant of hostilities in the east of Ukraine and peacekeeping missions of Ukraine under the auspices of the UN — UNPROFOR and IFOR.

== Biography ==
Oleksandr Lokota was born on 3 February 1961.

In 1982, he graduated from the Kyiv higher military command school named after M. V. Frunze.

Since October 1995, he held the position of commander of the 240th separate special battalion, together with which he participated in UNPROFOR and IFOR peacekeeping missions in Bosnia and Herzegovina.

During Lokota's leadership, the battalion was able to establish discipline and organization, which the Ukrainian unit was sorely lacking.

For a long time he held the post of Chief of Staff of the 6th Army Corps of the Armed Forces of Ukraine. On 20 August 2008, Lokota was promoted to major general.

In 2011, he served as the commander of the 6th Army Corps of the Armed Forces of Ukraine.

From 2012 to 2013, he became the head of the defense planning department of the command of the Ukrainian Ground Forces. In 2013, Lokota was appointed chief of staff of the Operational Command North.

== War In Donbas ==
During the war in eastern Ukraine in the summer of 2014, Lokota was included in the list of leaders of the Armed Forces of Ukraine who were to be destroyed according to representatives of terrorist organizations of the Donetsk and Luhansk People's Republic. Lokota appeared in this list with the rank of lieutenant general, while there was no information about the assignment of this rank to him, and in the video stories of the Ukrainian mass media he appeared with the epaulettes of a major general.

In 2015, Lokota was appointed commander of the Operational Command North, headquartered in Chernihiv. In September 2016, he was appointed First Deputy Commander of the Ground Forces of the Armed Forces of Ukraine.

He was replaced by Vyacheslav Nazarkin in February 2017.

In July 2017, he became the head of the main department of defense and mobilization planning, and the deputy chief of the General Staff of the Armed Forces of Ukraine.

Until 9 November 2017, he held the position of commander of the anti-terrorist operation forces in Ukraine.
