= Dmytro Bratishko =

- Дмитро Володимирович Братішко
- Bratisko in 2012
- Born: Dmytro Volodymyrovych Bratishko; Soviet Union
- Military career
- Allegiance: Ukraine
- Branch: Ukrainian Ground Forces
- Service years: 2012–present
- Rank: Brigadier General
- Commands: Operation Command East
- Conflicts: Russo-Ukrainian War

Dmytro Volodymyrovych Bratishko (Ukrainian: Дмитро Володимирович Братішко), is a Ukrainian army officer who served as the commander of the Operational Command East from 2024 to 2026.

Land Forces of the Armed Forces of Ukraine since 2024, and is the Commander of the Operational-tactical group "Zaporizhzhia" since 2025.

He is a brigadier general as of 2025.

== Biography ==
In 2018, he was the deputy commander of the 80th Brigade.

From September 2018 to 2021, he was the commander of the Lithuanian-Polish-Ukrainian Brigade.

In 2022, he was the commander of the 95th Separate Airborne Assault Brigade.

In 2024, he became the Chief of Staff - Deputy Commander of the Airborne Assault Forces.

On 6 December 2024, Bratishko became the commander of the Operational Command East.

In March 2025, he became the of the Operational-tactical group "Zaporizhzhia".

On 16 April 2026, Bartishko was dismissed and has been replaced by Viktor Nikoliuk as commander of the Operational Command East.
