= Huiva =

Huiva (Ukrainian: Гуйва) may stand for:

- Huiva (urban-type settlement), a town (urban-type settlement) in Zhytomyr Raion, Zhytomyr Oblast, Ukraine;
- Huiva (river), a river in Zhytomyr Oblast of Ukraine.
