= Vyacheslav Nazarkin =

Belarusian-born Ukrainian military officer (born 1964)

- В'ячеслав Миколайович Назаркін
- Nazarkin in 2011
- Born: Vyacheslav Mykolayovych Nazarkin; 2 November 1964 (age 61); Barysaw, Belarus, Soviet Union
- Military career
- Allegiance: Soviet Union; Ukraine
- Branch: Ukrainian Ground Forces
- Service years: 1985-
- Rank: Lieutenant general
- Commands: Operational Command North (2017)

Lieutenant general Vyacheslav Mykolayovych Nazarkin (Ukrainian: В'ячеслав Миколайович Назаркін; born on 2 November 1964), is a Belarusian-born Ukrainian former military officer who was the commander of the Operational Command North in 2017. He is the first deputy commander of the Ukrainian Ground Forces.

He is the Deputy Head of anti-terrorist operation forces, and the acting head of the Special Operations Department of the General Staff of the Armed Forces of Ukraine.

== Biography ==
Vyacheslav Nazarkin was born in Barysaw, Minsk Oblast on 2 November 1964.

He graduated from the Far Eastern Higher Combined Arms Command School. Nazarkin had joined the Soviet Army since 5 August 1985.

He served as part of the Group of Soviet Forces in East Germany. From 1989 to 1992, he was the commander of a platoon of cadets at the Omsk Higher Combined Arms Command Twice Red Banner School named after Frunze. Subsequently, he was in the position of company commander of the KGB of the USSR of the Siberian Military District.

In 1998 he graduated from the Kyiv Military Academy. From 1998 to 1999, he was the commander of the 17th regiment of the National Guard of Ukraine. After its disbandment from 2000 to 2005, he commanded a mechanized brigade created on the basis of the remnants of the 6th division of the National Guard.

From 2006 to 2007, he studied at the Academy of the General Staff of Ukraine. In 2007, he was the Deputy Commander of the 8th Army Corps.

On 5 December 2013, he was included in the Head of the Special Operations Department of the General Staff of the Armed Forces of Ukraine. He directly supervised individual operations, in particular, according to Mykola Kapinos, he was part of the Armed Forces unit during the battles for Savur-Mohyla.

On 24 September 2014, Major General Nazarkin was dismissed from the position of head of the Special Operations Forces Directorate of the General Staff of the Armed Forces of Ukraine.

On 5 February 2015, he was appointed First Deputy Commander of the Operational Command West.

In September 2016, Nazarkin was appointed commander of the Operational Command North.

On 14 October 2017, he was promoted lieutenant general.

== Criminal proceedings ==
After the publication of Anna Babinets' article "Black list of the army-2. Special General" in September 2014, the military prosecutor's office initiated criminal proceedings against Nazarkin under Part 3 of Article 425 of the Criminal Code of Ukraine: "Negligent treatment of military service that caused significant damage.".

He was probably dismissed as commander of the Operational Command North from those allegations in 2017, and was replaced by Volodymyr Kravchenko.

== Criticism ==
Agency for Journalistic Investigations “Investigation. Info" devoted to Nazarkin its plot "The black list of the army-2. Spetsgeneral”, which aired on the Public Television on 27 August 2014. The story mentioned, among other things, the following:

- “on his page in Odnoklassniki, Mr. Nazarkin actively likes anti-Maidan publications”
- “67% of the team openly do not trust the boss, and 75% do not consider him a professional in his field.”
- “Practically every special operation with the participation of Nazarkin ends in disaster and the deaths of special forces.”

Vyacheslav Nazarkin - Deputy Head of the Anti-Terrorist Operation. His brother is a Russian military man. It seems that Sergey Nazarkin is now serving on the side of the DPR and the brothers are actively communicating. When I asked Nazarkin himself if he had a brother who is a Russian military man, he replied: “I don’t know... In the meantime, you’re stopping me from working, because I’m doing a damn job that is fucking necessary in order to protect the state. Goodbye".

— Anna Babinets
