= 5th Communications Regiment (Ukraine) =

- 5-й окремий полк зв'язку
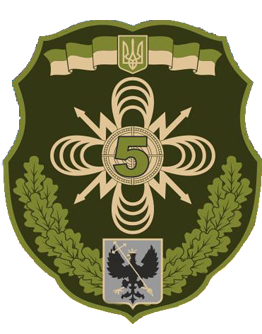
- Regiment insignia
- Founded: 2015
- Country: Ukraine
- Allegiance: Ministry of Defence
- Branch: Ukrainian Ground Forces
- Type: Regiment
- Role: Communications
- Garrison/HQ: Chernihiv
- Motto(s): "No communication, no victory"
- Engagements: Russo-Ukrainian War; War in Donbass; Russian invasion of Ukraine; Northern Ukraine campaign; Siege of Chernihiv; Eastern Ukraine campaign; Battle of Soledar; Battle of Bakhmut; 2022 Kharkiv counteroffensive; Southern Ukraine campaign; 2022 Kherson counteroffensive

Commanders
- Current commander: Colonel Igor Napolsky

The 5th Separate Communications Regiment (MUN A2995) is a regiment level signal and communication unit of the Ground Forces of Ukraine, operationally under the command of Operational Command North. It was established on 5 May 2015 and has since then taken part in both the War in Donbass and the Russian invasion of Ukraine.

== History ==
The 5th communication Regiment was formed on 5 May 2015 in Chernihiv, to perform support tasks in the Donetsk and Luhansk Oblasts with many servicemen being awarded state awards and distinctions. In the spring of 2018, it became part of Joint Forces Operation.

At the onset of the Russian invasion of Ukraine, he 5th Separate Communication Regiment had to evacuated from Chernihiv to prevent an encirclement during the Siege of Chernihiv, becoming hypermobile and was deployed to perform communication support tasks throughout the front, working to actively stop Russian efforts aimed at cutting off Ukrainian communications. The regiment's task also shifted more towards electronic warfare countermeasures, by conducting channel backup operations to hinder Russian attempts at jamming frequencies, using UAVs, video surveillance cameras and unspecified technologies to support the war effort throughout the front. At the start, it was operating in the Kherson, Luhansk and Chernihiv directions. In Chernihiv, the signalmen were given new tasks of reconnaissance, artillery adjustment and evacuated. The regiment's headquarters was also destroyed killing a soldier of the regiment and wounding one more. Later, it took part in the Battle of Bakhmut, Battle of Soledar, Battle of Kherson and the Battle of Kharkiv. The regiment was also involved in a financial scandal resulting in the losses of over 12 million hyrvnias. A soldier of the regiment, Pavlo Hryhorenko died on 18 October 2023 by Russian shelling in the Dnipropetrovsk Oblast.

== Structure ==
The structure of the regiment is as follows:

- Management & Headquarters
- 1st Signal Battalion
- 2nd Signal Battalion
- Radio relay Battalion
- Mobile Communications Battalion
- Material support Company
- Logistical Support Company
- Repair Company
- Commandant Platoon

== Commanders ==
- Unit commander: Colonel Igor Napolsky
- Chief of Staff: Lieutenant Colonel Kravchenko
