= Dmytro Krasylnykov =

Ukrainian brigadier general (born 1978)

- Born: Dmytro Serhiiovych Krasylnykov; 3 July 1978 (age 48); Ukraine
- Education: Odesa Military Academy, Ivan Chernyakhovsky National Defense University of Ukraine
- Military career
- Allegiance: Ukraine
- Branch: Armed Forces of Ukraine
- Rank: Brigadier general
- Conflicts: Russo-Ukrainian War; Russian invasion of Ukraine
- Awards: Order of the Gold Star

Dmytro Serhiiovych Krasylnykov (Ukrainian: Красильников Дмитро Сергійович; born 3 July 1978) is a Ukrainian brigadier general who commanded the Northern Operational Command from 2023 until his dismissal in 2025. He also commanded the Pivnich operational-strategic group. He is a Hero of Ukraine (2022).

== Biography ==
He was born on 3 July 1978. In 1995, he enrolled in the Odesa Institute of Land Forces. After graduation, he was assigned to the 95th Airborne Assault Brigade. In 2012, he entered the National Defense University of Ukraine.

In May 2014, he was summoned to the Ministry of Defense and ordered to form and lead the 34th Territorial Defense Battalion of Kirovohrad Oblast (reformed into a separate motorized infantry battalion, 57th Separate Motorized Brigade, in October).

On 21 July 2014, the soldiers of the 34th Battalion engaged in their first battle, participating in the liberation of the then Dzerzhynsk (now Toretsk). Troops of the Special Operations Forces were the first to reach the city executive committee building, while the "34th" with servicemen from the 169th Training Center "Desna" (a consolidated platoon tactical group) entered the city from two sides, destroying enemy checkpoints and strongholds, defeating reserves, and eliminating groups attempting to retreat from the city towards Horlivka and Yasynuvata.

Later, other units were created based on the 34th Battalion: motorized infantry battalions, reconnaissance platoons, an artillery unit, an air defense unit, and a communications unit. In October, they were all consolidated into the 57th Separate Motorized Brigade. In 2015, Dmytro Krasylnykov became its commander. The unit took part in the Battle of Debaltseve.

With the start of the Russian invasion of Ukraine on 24 February 2022, the commander of the Northern Operational-Tactical Grouping resisted continuous assaults for two days, saving people and equipment. He prevented the enemy from reaching Kharkiv from Luhansk Oblast.

On 13 March 2023, he was appointed as the commander of the Northern Operational Command and served in the role until his dismissal on 7 March 2025.

== Awards ==
He was awarded the title of Hero of Ukraine with the Order of the Golden Star on 28 February 2022, for personal courage and heroism demonstrated in defense of Ukraine's state sovereignty and territorial integrity, as well as for his loyalty to the military oath.
