= Oleksandr Nesterenko =

Ukrainian military officer

- Олександр Володимирович Нестеренко
- Born: Olekesandr Voldymyrovych Nesterenko; 13 October 1972 (age 54); Sumy, Ukrainian SSR, Soviet Union
- Military career
- Allegiance: Ukraine
- Branch: Ukrainian Ground Forces
- Rank: Major General
- Commands: Operation Command East (2019-2021)
- Conflicts: Russo-Ukrainian War
- Awards: Order of Bohdan Khmelnytsky (III degree); Орден Архистратига Михаїла (II degree)

Olekesandr Voldymyrovych Nesterenko (Ukrainian: Олександр Володимирович Нестеренко; born on 13 October 1972), is a Ukrainian military officer, who had served as the commander of Operation Command East from 2019 to 2021.

He had been the deputy commander of the Operational Command North from 2017 to 2019.

He is a major general as of 2019.

== Biography ==
Oleksandr Nesterenko was born in Sumy on 13 October 1972.

Until October 2007, he held the positions of deputy commander and commander of the 169th tank regiment "Desna", and in that time, Nesterenko was the Chief of Staff of the 30th Separate Mechanized Brigade.

On October 12, 2007, as part of the peacekeeping unit of the ninth rotation of the Ukrainian contingent of the peacekeeping mission in Kosovo was formed on the basis of the 2nd mechanized battalion of the 30th mechanized brigade, Nesterenko was appointed the commander of the national component of the new rotation "UkrPolbat". Nesterenko performed his duties in this position until the end of the 9th rotation on April 16, 2008.

In November 2009, Nesterenko received the rank of colonel, at the time of promotion he was the commander of the 30th separate mechanized brigade.

In August 2014, Nesterenko was appointed first deputy commander of the 8th AK. Subsequently, as the 8th AK was disbanded in 2017 Nesterenko was appointed the deputy commander for territorial defense of the Operational Command North.

On 18 July 2019, Nesterenko was appointed commander of the Operational Command East.

On 5 December 2019, he was promoted to major general.

He is replaced by his successor, Oleh Mikats 9 August 2021.

As of October 2022, Nesterenko became the Deputy Commander of the Land Forces of the Armed Forces of Ukraine.
