= 23rd Mechanized Brigade =

Ukrainian Ground Forces formation

- 23 окрема механізована бригада
- Brigade insignia
- Active: 18 February 2023 – present
- Country: Ukraine
- Branch: Ukrainian Ground Forces
- Type: Mechanized Infantry
- Part of: Operational Command East
- Garrison/HQ: Pokrovsk, Donetsk Oblast
- Engagements: Russo-Ukrainian War; Russian invasion of Ukraine; 2023 Ukrainian counteroffensive; Battle of Ocheretyne

The 23rd Mechanized Brigade (Ukrainian: 23-тя окрема механізована бригада) is a brigade of the Ukrainian Ground Forces formed on February 18, 2023, during the Russian invasion of Ukraine.

== History ==
=== 2023 ===
In 2023, as part of the troops of the Tavria operational-strategic group, they fought in the Zaporizhzhia direction. On June 4, 2023, the brigade, together with the 110th Territorial Defense Brigade, liberated the village of Novodarivka. Units of the brigade attacked Russian positions in a convoy of 2 tanks and 6 armored vehicles. On the approach, some of the armored vehicles were blown up by anti-tank mines, and a Russian tank from an ambush shot a direct hit at the column. However, the crews and infantrymen of the 23rd brigade did not retreat, but entrenched themselves in a position near the broken equipment and after some time advanced forward. The 110th Territorial Defense Brigade attacked Novodarivka from the other flank. According to Ukrainian soldiers, the Russian infantry in the village was supported by 3 T-90A tanks. One of them was destroyed on the outskirts of the village by a grenade launcher of the 110th TRO brigade, the other two escaped, including the crew that attacked the column. The Russian infantry left in the village were defeated in a contact battle by soldiers of the 23rd and 110th brigades.

=== 2024 ===
On January 4, 2024, near the village of Novomykhailivka, Russian troops executed 6 captured Ukrainian soldiers of the 23rd Mechanized Brigade.

In April 2024, the Brigade fought in the Battle of Ocheretyne.

== Structure ==
As of 2024, the brigade's structure is as follows:

- 23rd Mechanized Brigade, Pokrovsk, Donetsk Oblast
  - Headquarters & Headquarters Company
  - 1st Mechanized Battalion
  - 2nd Mechanized Battalion
  - 3rd Mechanized Battalion
  - Artillery Group
  - Anti-Aircraft Defense Battalion
  - Reconnaissance Company
  - Unmanned Systems Battalion "Clear Eyes" ("Ясні очі"). Founded by Georgy Volkov in March 2022 as an independent drone crew.
    - Aerial Reconnaissance Platoon
    - Unmanned Systems Battalion "Harvester" ("Жнець")
    - Night Reconnaissance Unit "Vampire" (БПЛА Вампір)
    - Attack Drone Company
  - Tank Battalion
  - Engineer Battalion
  - Logistic Battalion
  - Signal Company
  - Maintenance Battalion
  - Radar Company
  - Medical Company
  - Chemical, Biological, Radiological and Nuclear Defense Company
