= 54th Reconnaissance Battalion (Ukraine) =

Ukrainian military volunteer unit

- 54-й окремий розвідувальний батальйон
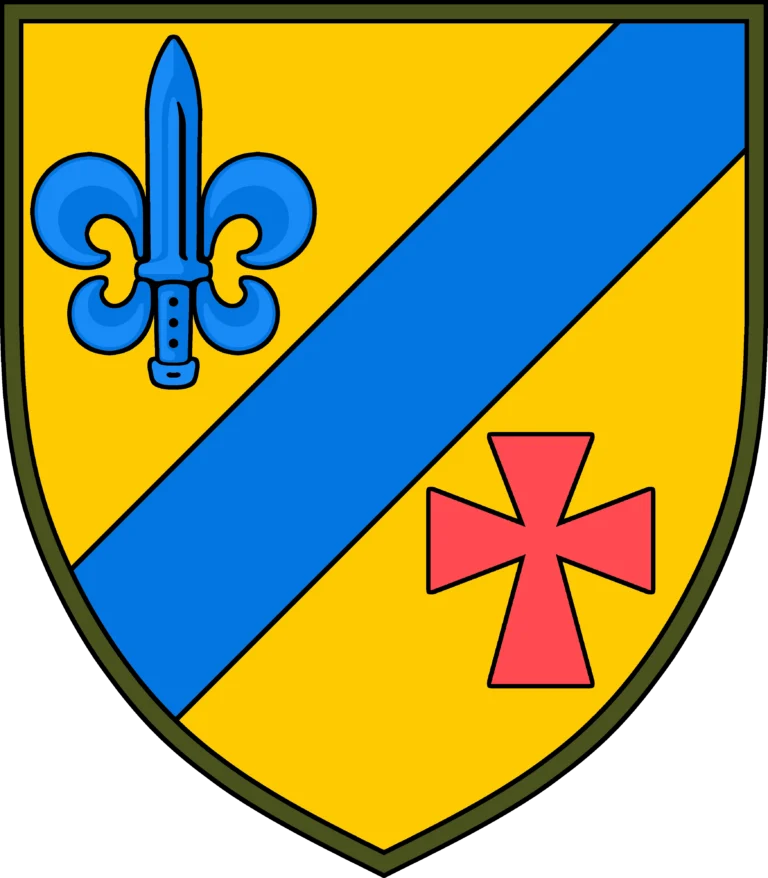
- Battalion's insignia
- Founded: 1992
- Country: Ukraine
- Allegiance: Armed Forces of Ukraine
- Branch: Ukrainian Ground Forces
- Type: Battalion, spetsnaz
- Role: Reconnaissance, counteroffensive and sabotage
- Part of: Operational Command North
- Garrison/HQ: Zviahel
- Nickname: Mykhailo Tysha Battalion
- Motto: "For life to death"
- Engagements: Russo-Ukrainian War; War in Donbass; 2022 Russian invasion of Ukraine

Insignia
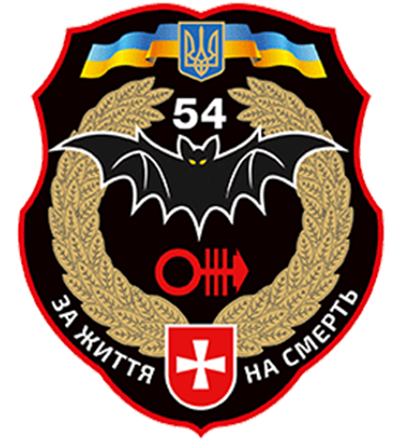
- Former Insignia

The 54th Separate Reconnaissance Battalion (MUN A2076) is a battalion of the Ukrainian ground forces acting as an independent unit subordinated directly to the Operational Command North and has seen combat during both the War in Donbass and the Russo-Ukrainian war, performing reconnaissance and combat operations throughout the entire front.

== History ==
In 1992, the 54th Separate Guards Reconnaissance Prut-Pomeranian Battalion of the Soviet Armed Forces was subordinated to the Ministry of Defense of Ukraine following the Dissolution of the Soviet Union. The personnel of the battalion swore allegiance to the Ukrainian people. Since 1992, the battalion's personnel have been actively participating in peacekeeping operations in the Balkans, Africa, and the Middle East.

On 17 November 2014, near an observation post near Novoorlivka, an improvised explosive device blew up a Ural-169, while coming to rescue, a soldier of the battalion, Yurchenko Igor Petrovych was killed in a second IED attack. On 10 December 2014, near the settlement of Nikishine, during a "truce", when Ukrainian forces were not allowed to open fire, 10 Russian "marines" snuck up on 4 Ukrainian soldiers, of which two split up to force the Russians to withdraw without firing, the Russians ambushed them and killed the two with sniper fire and grenade launchers, one amongst the two was a battalion soldier, Kiris Vasyl Vasylovich. At the end of January 2015, the unit, commanded by Senior Lieutenant Serhiy Svishch, a group of the battalion arrived to replace personnel at a stronghold near Sanzharivka as the Separatists launched an offensive on the stronghold after heavy artillery and mortar shelling. In the ensuing battle, the Ukrainians managed to destroy two separatist tanks and a part of the assaulting force, but one separatist tank began moving towards the trench where Svyshch Serhiy Serhiyovych was present, he was rolled over by the tank and died. The third tank was also destroyed soon after his death. Another soldier of the battalion, Wenger Oleksandr Anatoliyovych was killed in this battle. On 14 July 2015, a soldier of the battalion, Hrynchuk Yuriy Petrovych was killed during a mortar attack on a Ukrainian stronghold near Leninske. On 4 August 2015, during a mortar attack by separatists on an observation post at near Leninske, a shell exploded killing a soldier of the battalion Trofimchuk Valeriy Vasyliovych along with a soldier of the 57th Brigade. On 13 April 2016, a soldier of the battalion, Levin Konstantin Vladyslavovich was killed by a sniper near Travneve. On 18 April 2016, a soldier of the battalion Zhordochkin Vadim Vikentiyovych was killed in action near Shyrokyne. On 23 July 2016, a soldier of the battalion, Bessarab Konstantin Nikolaevich was killed by artillery fire near Hnutove. On 10 October 2016, three soldiers of the battalion, Nenitsa Anatoly Valeriyovych, Babivskyi Ruslan Gennadiyovych and Volkov Yuri Vasilyevich were killed as a result of mortar shelling of Shyrokyne. On 22 November 2016, a soldier of the battalion Kaptovanets Maryan Romanovych was killed during a clash between Shyrokyne and Vodyane. On 10 July 2017, a soldier of the battalion (Babkov Vitaliy Igorovych) was killed as a result of a landmine explosion near Stanytsia Luhanska. On 1 September 2018, a soldier of the battalion, Ivan Aleksandrovich Belyaev was killed as a result of an unknown explosive device detonation while carrying out engineering work during construction of fortifications in Svitlodarsk. In November 2019, a soldier of the battalion, Atamanenko Oleksandr was killed in action. On 13 May 2020, while performing combat training missions near Kramatorsk, two officers of the battalion Suprigan Andriy Valeriyovych and Kuzmenko Dmytro Pavlovych died as a result of landing from a helicopter straight into the water. On 12 March 2021, a soldier of the battalion Pekur Oleksandr Valentynovich was killed as a result of sniper fire at a combat post near Marinka.

Following the 2022 Russian invasion of Ukraine, it saw combat against Russian forces. On 27 February 2022, it took part in combat in Milkivska Gora during the Battle of Chernihiv. On 10 June 2022, a soldier of the battalion, Kostyuchenko Serhiy Petrovych was killed in action. A soldier of the battalion, Medvedev Oleg Rocker was killed on 16 September 2023 in Sumy Oblast. In September 2026, a Chinese drone operator belonging to its Chinese Platoon, Tan Zhen was killed in action and buried in a military cemetery in Zhytomyr.

== Structure ==
- Management & Headquarters
- 1st Reconnaissance Company
- 2nd Reconnaissance Company;
- Long Range Reconnaissance Company
- Fire Support Company
- UAV Company
- Reconnaissance Equipment Platoon
- Reconnaissance Surveillance Platoon
- Commandant Platoon
- Maintenance Platoon
- Communications Platoon
- Logistics Platoon
- Medical Platoon
- Financial and Economic service

== Sources ==
- 54-тий окремий розвідувальний батальйон готується знову повернутися на фронт
