= 121st Communications Regiment (Ukraine) =

- 121-й окремий полк зв'язку
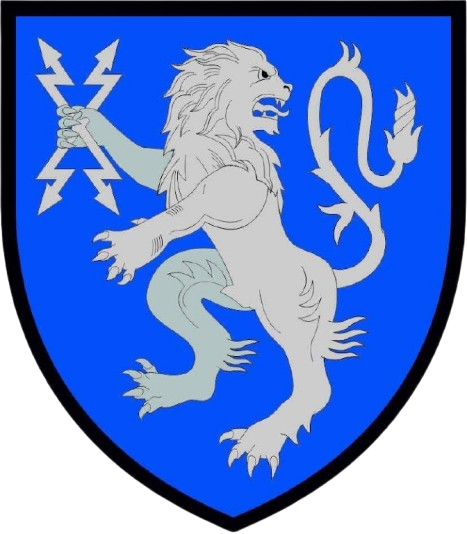
- Regiment insignia
- Founded: 1941
- Country: Ukraine
- Allegiance: Ministry of Defence
- Branch: Ukrainian Ground Forces
- Type: Regiment
- Role: Communications
- Garrison/HQ: Cherkaske, Dnipropetrovsk Oblast
- Engagements: Russo-Ukrainian War; War in Donbass; Russian invasion of Ukraine

The 121st Separate Communications Regiment (MUN 1214) is a regiment level signal and communication unit of the Ground Forces of Ukraine, operationally under the command of Operational Command East. It was established in 1941 as part of the Soviet union's 13th army and took part in the Second World War. Then in 1991, it swore allegiance to Ukraine being the first unit to do so and has since 2014, taken part in both the War in Donbass and the Russian invasion of Ukraine.

== History ==
It was originally established in 1941 and partook in the Second World War.

In January 1992, the regiment took an oath of allegiance to Ukraine and as of 24 June 2006, it was named the 121st Separate Guards Linear-Nodal Fokshan-Mukden Orders of Alexander Nevsky and the Red Star Signal Regiment.

It took part and saw action during the War in Donbass. On 29 August 2014, during the Battle of Ilovaisk in Novokaterinivka, the brigade commander's UAZ and the communications armored R-149BMR personnel carrier were hit by BM-21 Grads and four servicemen of the brigade including the brigade commander Borys Borisovich Kyforenko and three other personnel (Yakiv Nikolaevich Guba, Yevgeny Olegovich Solodovnyk and Igor Vladimirovich Yurkovets) were killed in action. The commander was tied up with tape by Russian paratroopers of the 247th Guards Air Assault Regiment who arrived in a BMP-2 and left him for dead. On 18 November 2015, the it was stripped off of Soviet awards and titles and became the 121st Separate Guards Signal Brigade with the word "Guards" being stripped soon after on 22 August 2016. Moreover, the brigade was also engaged during the Siege of Sloviansk as well as operations in Krasnohorivka, Vodiane and Pisky.

Following the Russian invasion of Ukraine, it saw combat. On 19 December 2023, a soldier of the regiment (Reshetilenko Andrij Pavlovych) was killed on the frontlines.

== Equipment ==
Type	Image	Origin	Class	Notes
Vehicles
A2M1-07		Soviet Union	Communication Vehicle	
R-149BMR		Soviet Union	Command and Communication Vehicle	
Kozak		Ukraine	Infantry mobility vehicle	
ZIL-131		Soviet Union	General purpose off-road 6×6 vehicle	
Bogdan-2251		Ukraine	Medevac vehicle	

== Structure ==
The structure of the regiment is as follows:

- Management & Headquarters
- 1st Signal Battalion
- 2nd Signal Battalion
- Radio relay Battalion
- Mobile Communications Battalion
- Material support Company
- Logistical Support Company
- Repair Company
- Commandant Platoon
