= 60th Artillery Brigade (Ukraine) =

Ukrainian Ground Forces unit

- 60 окрема артилерійська бригада
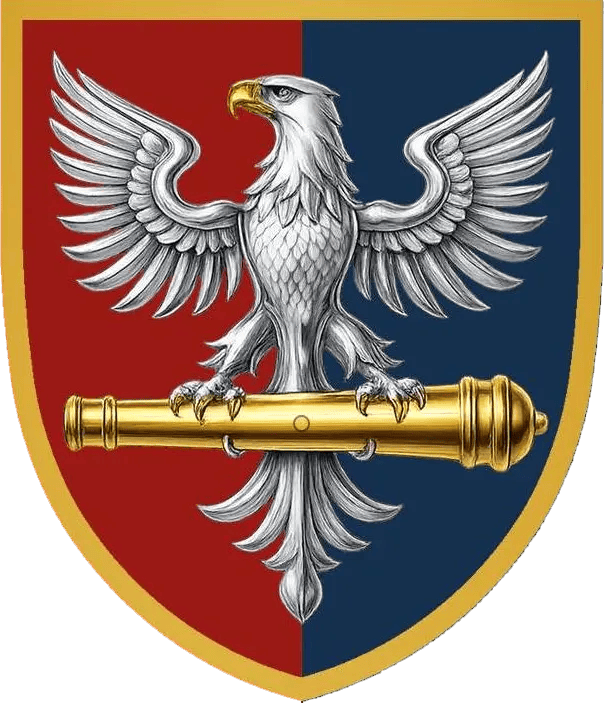
- Active: July 2025 – present
- Country: Ukraine
- Allegiance: Armed Forces of Ukraine
- Branch: Ukrainian Ground Forces
- Type: Rocket and Artillery Forces
- Role: Artillery
- Size: Brigade
- Part of: Operational Command South: 20th Army Corps
- Garrison/HQ: Pervomaisk, Mykolaiv Oblast
- Engagements: Russo-Ukrainian War: Full scale invasion
- Website: Official Facebook page

Insignia
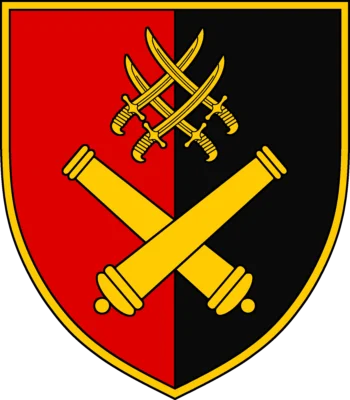
- Insignia (until 2025)

The 60th Separate Artillery Brigade (Ukrainian: 60-та окрема артилерійська бригада) is a brigade of the Ukrainian Ground Forces.

== History ==
The 60th brigade is a military unit of the Ground Forces, and currently under the command of 20th Army Corps. The unit is based in Pervomaisk, Mykolaiv Oblast.

== Structure ==
As of 2025, the brigade's structure was as following:

60th Artillery Brigade
  - Headquarters & Headquarters Company
  - 1st Artillery Battalion
  - 2nd Artillery Battalion
  - 3rd Artillery Battalion
  - 4th Artillery Battalion
  - Artillery Reconnaissance Battalion
  - Engineer Company
  - Maintenance Company
  - Logistic Company
  - Signal Company
  - Radar Company
  - Medical Company
  - CBRN Protection Company
