= 114th Territorial Defense Brigade =

Ukrainian Territorial Defense Forces unit

- Ukrainian: 114-та окрема бригада територіальної оборони
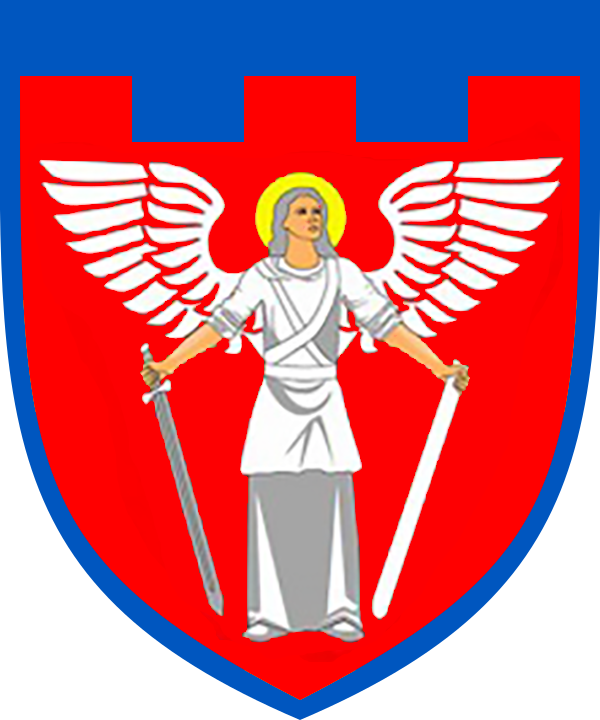
- Active: May 2018 - present
- Country: Ukraine
- Branch: Armed Forces of Ukraine
- Type: Military reserve force
- Role: Light infantry
- Part of: Territorial Defense Forces
- Garrison/HQ: Kyiv Oblast; MUN А7042
- Engagements: Russo-Ukrainian war: Russian invasion of Ukraine
- Website: https://kobratro.org.ua/

The 114th Territorial Defense Brigade (Ukrainian: 114-та окрема бригада територіальної оборони) is a military formation of the Territorial Defense Forces of Ukraine in Kyiv Oblast. It is part of Operational Command North.

== History ==
=== Formation ===
In May 2018 the brigade was formed in Kyiv Oblast. By 6 October there was the 134th Territorial Defense Battalion in Vyshhorod. On 13 September 2019 a training exercise for the 132nd Battalion took place in Bila Tserkva. From 22 to 30 September 2021, strategic command and staff exercises Joint Efforts-2021 were held in Ukraine. Brigade took part in it along with about 12,500 troops and troops from 15 countries, including 11 NATO member countries. 132nd Battalion from Bila Tserkva took part in that exercise.

On 12 February 2022 special training for civilians was held by 208th Battalion.

=== Russo-Ukrainian War ===
==== Russian invasion of Ukraine ====
Due to the increase in number of territorial defense units by middle of March, 133rd Territorial Defense Battalion had to begin accepting soldiers aged 18-65. Units of the battalion defended and organized a river crossing between Bucha and Irpin. They also helped units of 72nd Mechanized Brigade.

134th Battalion spent over 4 months deployed to the Eastern part of Ukraine.

A company from 137th Battalion took part in the defense of Soledar from May to August. More than half of the company sustained casualties, 5 soldiers were killed. Another company took part in the liberation of Kharkiv Oblast.

135th Battalion spent about a month in Zhytomyr Oblast going through training. In early June they were sent near Bakhmut.

On 12 September a new battalion was raised.

On 29 August the brigade received its battle flag.

On 19 April 2023 Come Back Alive foundation announced that the brigade received 3 pick-up trucks, radios, generators, Starlink terminals and other equipment for the "Long arms of TrO" project designed to give 120 mm mortars to those units.

== Structure ==
As of 2022 the brigade's structure is as follows:

- 114th Territorial Defense Brigade
  - Headquarters
  - 132nd Territorial Defense Battalion (Bila Tserkva) MUN А7298
  - 133rd Territorial Defense Battalion (Bucha) MUN А7299
  - 134th Territorial Defense Battalion (Vyshhorod) MUN А7300
  - 135th Territorial Defense Battalion (Obukhiv) MUN А7301
  - 136th Territorial Defense Battalion (Brovary) MUN А7302
  - 137th Territorial Defense Battalion (Haishyn) MUN А7303
  - 208th Territorial Defense Battalion (Fastiv) MUN А7377
  - 240th Territorial Defense Battalion (Kyiv)
  - 243rd Territorial Defense Battalion (Irpin) MUN А4247 - transferred to 241st Territorial Defense Brigade
  - 250th Territorial Defense Battalion
  - Engineering Company
  - Communication Company
  - Logistics Company
  - Mortar Battery
  - Anti-Aircraft unit

== Commanders ==
- Colonel Koval Oleksandr 2018 - present

== See also ==
- Territorial Defense Forces of the Armed Forces of Ukraine

== Sources ==
"Готові до спротиву" - документальний фільм 1 | 114 Бригада ТрО ЗСУ (ТРО Медіа) ["Ready to resist" - documentary film 1 | 114th Brigade of the Territorial Defense Forces of the Armed Forces of Ukraine (TRO Media) Video on YouTube
