= 423rd Unmanned Systems Battalion (Ukraine) =

423rd Unmanned Systems "Scythian Griffins" Battalion
- Ukrainian: 423-й Окремий Батальйон Безпілотних Систем “Скіфські грифони”
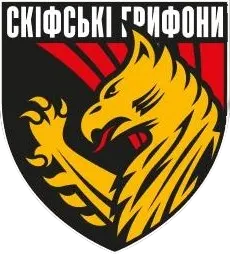
- Insignia
- Active: January 2024–present
- Country: Ukraine
- Allegiance: Ukraine
- Branch: Ukrainian Ground Forces
- Role: Unmanned Systems
- Size: Battalion
- Part of: 20th Army Corps
- Engagements: Russo-Ukrainian war; 2022 Russian invasion of Ukraine
- Website: Official Website

Commanders
- Current commander: Lieutenant Colonel Vitaliy Gersak

The 423rd Unmanned Systems "Scythian Griffins" Battalion (Ukrainian: 423-й Окремий Батальйон Безпілотних Систем “Скіфські грифони”) is a battalion level military unit of the Ground Forces of Ukraine, concerned with drone warfare using Unmanned Aerial Vehicles and Unmanned Ground Vehicles. It was established in 2024 and has seen combat during the Russian invasion of Ukraine.

Since the beginning of 2025, the battalion has been established amongst the Top 20 Ukrainian units in the use of unmanned systems. It is the first in terms of effectiveness amongst battalion-sized units.

== History ==
It is a part of the "Dronefall" project, which raises money to purchase drones used against Russian UAVs. In August 2025, it reportedly successfully destroyed a Russian turtle tank and its mounted infantry component using a combination of FPV drones and a heavy bomber. In October 2025, one of their pilots successfully intercepted a Russian Zala Z-16 long-range reconnaissance drone.

== Equipment ==
The unit uses a number of types of unmanned aerial vehicles, including counter-drone drones and aerial reconnaissance drones.
