= Pivnich operational-strategic group =

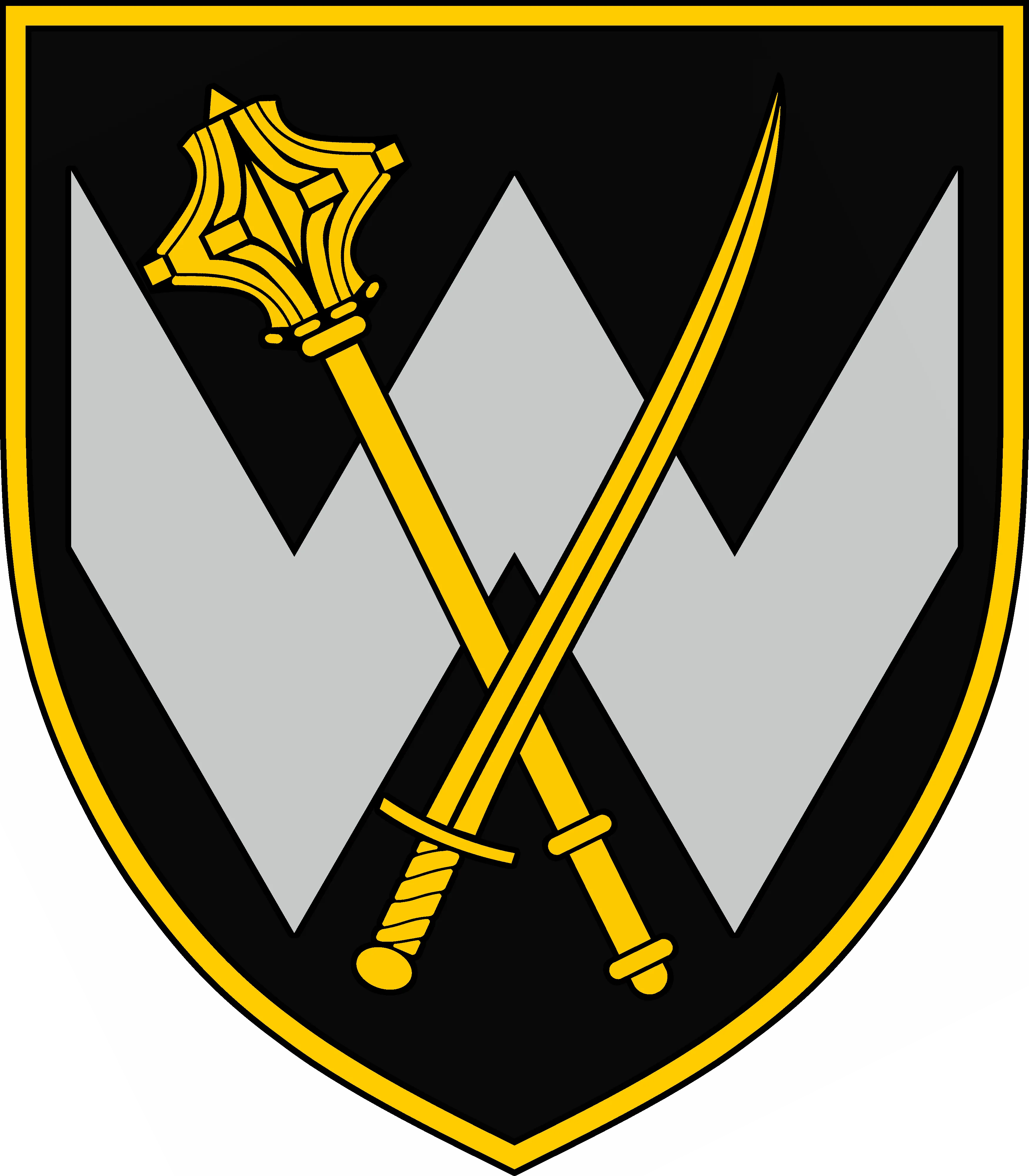
- Active: 2022–2024
- Country: Ukraine
- Branch: Ukrainian Ground Forces
- Type: Regional command
- Engagements: Russian Invasion of Ukraine

Commanders
- Current commander: Lieutenant General Serhii Naiev (till 2024)

The Pivnich (lit. North) operational-strategic group (abbr. Pivnich OSG) was a formation of the Ukrainian Ground Forces in Ukraine active in the Russian invasion of Ukraine. The operational group was under the command of Joint Forces commander Lieutenant General Serhii Naiev till 2024.

As of 2025 the OSG is disbanded.

== Structure ==
As of beginning of 2024 Pivnich OSG consists of:

- Volyhn OG
- Kyiv Directorate
- Chernihiv OG (formerly Siversk OSG)
- Sumy operational-tactical group
