= Operational Command East =

- Оперативне командування Схід
- Shoulder sleeve insignia
- Active: January 1, 2015 - Present
- Country: Ukraine
- Branch: Ukrainian Ground Forces
- Type: Military district
- Part of: Armed Forces of Ukraine
- Garrison/HQ: Dnipro, Dnipropetrovsk Oblast
- Engagements: Russo-Ukrainian War; War in Donbas; Russian Invasion of Ukraine
- Website: https://www.facebook.com/EastOC

Commanders
- Current commander: Viktor Nikoliuk

The Operational Command East (abbr. OC East, Ukrainian: Оперативне командування "Схід", ОК "Схід") is a formation of the Ukrainian Ground Forces in eastern Ukraine. Its headquarters is currently located in Dnipro.

== History ==
Map of Operational Command East in Ukraine

When Ukraine gained independence from the Soviet Union in 1991, there were three Soviet military districts in its territory. These were the Kyiv Military District, the Odesa Military District, and the Carpathian Military District. In January 1998, the Southern Operational Command was created from the Odesa MD and the eastern part of the Kyiv MD. In 2005, the Southern Operational Association was created from the Southern Operational Command. In October 2013, Operational Command South was created from the Southern Operational Association. In January 2015, Operational Command East was established with control over forces in Donetsk, Luhansk, Kharkiv, Dnipropetrovsk, and Zaporizhzhia oblasts. These areas were previously controlled by Operation Command South. The command at the time was led by Lieutenant General Serhii Naiev. Units under the operational control of OC East were involved in the War in Donbas.

Since the 2022 Russian invasion of Ukraine, units of OC East have been involved in heavy fighting with Russian forces during the battle of Donbas.

== Organization ==
Operational Command East has operational command of ground force units in Donetsk, Luhansk, Dnipropetrovsk, Zaporizhzhia, and Kharkiv oblasts.

- Operational Command East, in Dnipro
  - 5th Tank Brigade, in Kryvyi Rih
  - 17th Tank Brigade, in Kryvyi Rih
  - 23rd Mechanized Brigade, in Pokrovsk
  - 43rd Mechanized Brigade, in Dnipro
  - 53rd Mechanized Brigade, in Sievierodonetsk
  - 54th Mechanized Brigade, in Bakhmut
  - 67th Mechanized Brigade, in Dnipro
  - 92nd Mechanized Brigade, in Kluhyno-Bashkyrivka
  - 93rd Mechanized Brigade, in Cherkaske
  - 47th Artillery Brigade, in Kharkiv
  - 55th Artillery Brigade, in Zaporizhzhia
  - 1039th Anti-aircraft Missile Regiment, in Hvardiiske
  - 91st Engineer Brigade, in Okhtyrka
  - 121st Signal Regiment, in Cherkaske
  - 532nd Maintenance Regiment, in Cherkaske
  - 425th Skala Assault Battalion, in Dnipro
  - 74th Reconnaissance Battalion, in Cherkaske
  - 129th Reconnaissance Battalion, in Nikolske
  - 78th Materiel Support Battalion, in Kryvyi Rih
  - 133rd Guard & Service Battalion, in Dnipro
  - 227th Transport Battalion, in Kryvyi Rih
  - 502nd Electronic Warfare Regiment, in Cherkaske
  - 188th Command & Intelligence Center, in Dnipro
  - 368th Information & Signal Center, in Dnipro

=== Additional forces ===
The following formations of other branches of the Ukrainian Armed Forces, respectively the general staff of the Ukrainian ground forces, are based in the area of Operational Command East and can be assigned to the command as needed:

- Air Assault Forces:
  - 25th Airborne Brigade, in Hvardiiske
- Air Force:
  - 164th Radio Technical Brigade, in Kharkiv
  - 138th Anti-Aircraft Missile Brigade, in Dnipro
  - 301st Anti-Aircraft Missile Regiment, in Nikopol
  - 302nd Anti-Aircraft Missile Regiment, in Kharkiv
  - 57th Communication Regiment, in Dnipro
- Special Operations Forces:
  - 47th Special Forces Detachment
- Territorial Defense Forces
  - 108th Territorial Defence Brigade "Dnipropetrovsk"
  - 109th Territorial Defence Brigade "Donetsk"
  - 110th Territorial Defence Brigade "Zaporizhzhia"
  - 111th Territorial Defence Brigade "Luhansk"
  - 113th Territorial Defence Brigade "Kharkiv"
  - 127th Territorial Defence Brigade "Kharkiv City"
  - 128th Territorial Defence Brigade "Dnipro City"
  - 129th Territorial Defence Brigade "Kryvyi Rih"
  - 3rd Infantry Battalion "Dnipro"
  - 6th Infantry Battalion "Zaporizhzhia"
  - 17th Infantry Battalion "Kharkiv"
  - 105th Infantry Battalion "Donetsk"
  - Infantry Battalion "Luhansk"

== Leadership ==
=== Commanders ===
- Major General Serhii Naiev (2015—2017)
- Lieutenant General Oleksandr Krasanook (2017 - 18 July 2019)
- Major General Oleksandr Nesterenko (18 July 2019 - 9 August 2021)
- Major General Oleh Mikats (9 August 2021-?)
- Brigadier General Oleksandr Tarnavskyi (2023-2024)
- Brigadier General Andrii Hnatov (2024)
- Brigadier General Dmytro Bratishko (6 December 2024 - 16 April 2026)
- Viktor Nikoliuk (16 April 2026)

=== Chiefs of staff - first deputy commanders ===
- Major General Ihor Palahnyuk (2017-2019)
- Major General Eduard Moskaliov (2019-2022)
- Brigadier General Oleksandr Tarnavskyi (2022 - 24 August 2023)
- Brigadier General Serhiy Sirchenko (24 August 2023-present)

=== Deputy Commanders ===
- Brigadier General Vladyslav Klochov (2019-2021)
- Brigadier General Volodymyr Shvorak (2022 - 3 June 2025)
- Colonel Vadym Sukharevsky (3 June 2025 - present)

== See also ==
- Kharkov Military District
