= Ihor Kolesnyk =

Ukrainian army officer

- Ігор Іванович Колесник
- Born: Ihor Ivavovych Kolesnyk; 30 November 1966 (age 59); Soviet Union
- Military career
- Allegiance: Soviet Union; Ukraine
- Branch: Ukrainian Ground Forces
- Service years: 1987-
- Rank: Major general
- Commands: Operational Command North (November 2013 to 2015)

Colonel General Ihor Ivavovych Kolesnyk (Ukrainian: Ігор Іванович Колесник; born on 30 November 1966), is a Ukrainian army officer who had been the First Deputy Chief of the General Staff of the Armed Forces of Ukraine from 2016 to 2019.

From 2013 to 2015, Kolesnyk was the commander Operational Command North. Until 2013, he was the commander of the 13th Army Corps.

== Biography ==
Ihor Kolesnyk was born on 30 November 1966.

In 1983, he graduated from the Kyiv Suvorov Military College.

From August 1983 to September 1987, he was a cadet at the Moscow Higher Military Command School.

He began his officer service in 1987 as a motorized rifle platoon commander in the Carpathian Military District. By 1995, after passing through the ranks of the military service, he became the chief of staff — the first deputy of the motorized rifle regiment.

In 1997, he received military education at the operational-tactical level at the National Defense Academy of Ukraine. After completing his studies, he served in the Operational Command West in the following positions: commander of a motorized rifle regiment; commander of a separate mechanized brigade.

In 2006, he completed his studies at the operational and strategic level specialist training faculty of the National Defense Academy of Ukraine, and was appointed to the post of chief of staff — first deputy commander of the 13th Army Corps of the Ground Forces of the Armed Forces of Ukraine.

On 20 August 2009, by decree of the President of Ukraine No. 645/2009, Colonel Kolesnyk was awarded the rank of Major General.

In March 2011, after the retirement of Lieutenant General Serhiy Horoshnikov, he was appointed temporary acting commander of the 13th Army Corps.

At the end of May of the same year, Kolesnyk was suspended from his duties during the investigation into the sale of weapons by an ensign of his military unit, but later he continued to serve in the same position. In September, after the appointment of Major General Serhiy Popko, as corps commander, he returned to the duties of chief of staff.

On 2 July 2012, by order of the Minister of Defense of Ukraine, Kolesnyk was appointed commander of the 13th Army Corps, and on 6 December of the same year, he was given the rank of lieutenant general.

In November 2013, the 13th Army Corps was reorganized into the "North" operational command, with Kolesnyk remaining its commander.

In July 2014, during the war in the east of Ukraine, some mass media spread information that Lieutenant General Kolesnyk visited the soldiers on the front line and, when asked where to get body armor, answered: "You will get it in battle!". The press center of Operation Command North denied this information, noting that the soldiers of the mentioned tank brigade are provided with means of protection for 90%.

In 2015, Kolesnyk was appointed to the post of Deputy Chief of the General Staff of the Armed Forces of Ukraine.

In 2016, he was appointed to the position of First Deputy Chief of the General Staff of the Armed Forces of Ukraine.

In August 2017, by the Decree of the President of Ukraine, Kolesnyk was promoted to colonel general.
