= 129th Reconnaissance Battalion (Ukraine) =

Ukrainian military volunteer unit

- 129-й окремий розвідувальний батальйон
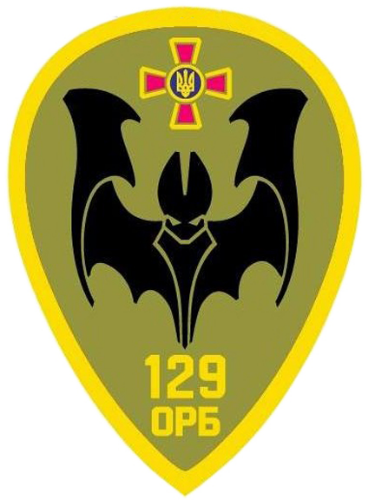
- Battalion's insignia
- Founded: 2014
- Country: Ukraine
- Allegiance: Ministry of Defence
- Branch: Ukrainian Ground Forces
- Type: Spetsnaz
- Role: Reconnaissance, counteroffensive and sabotage
- Part of: Operational Command East
- Garrison/HQ: Nikolske
- Engagements: Russo-Ukrainian War; War in Donbass; 2022 Russian invasion of Ukraine

Commanders
- Current commander: Konstantin Parshin

The 129th Separate Reconnaissance Battalion is a battalion of the Ukrainian ground forces acting as an independent unit subordinated directly to the Operational Command East and has seen combat during both the War in Donbass and the Russo-Ukrainian war, performing reconnaissance and combat operations throughout the entire front.

== History ==
It was established by the Mariupol United City Military Commissariat of Donetsk Region with its completion being set for 29 December 2014 in accordance with the joint directive of the Ministry of Defense of Ukraine and the General Staff of the Armed Forces of Ukraine dated 25 November 2014, initially by Operational Command South and later transferred to Operational Command East. It was trained by foreign specialists including the head of Georgian military intelligence.

Following the 2022 Russian invasion of Ukraine, it saw combat. On 22 July 2022, a soldier of the battalion, Pepryk Roman Olegovich was killed during a rocket attack near Apostolove. It has been working in coordination with the Main Directorate of Intelligence (Ukraine). Most activities of the Battalion are kept secret.

== Structure ==
The structure of the battalion is as follows:

- Management & Headquarters
- 1st Reconnaissance Company
- 2nd Reconnaissance Company
- Long Range Reconnaissance Company
- UAV Reconnaissance Company
- Fire Support Company
- Maintenance Platoon
- Logistics Platoon
- Commandant Platoon
- Medical Center
