= 118th Territorial Defense Brigade =

Ukrainian Territorial Defense Forces unit

- Ukrainian: 118-та окрема бригада територіальної оборони
- Shoulder sleeve insignia
- Active: 7 November 2018 – present
- Country: Ukraine
- Branch: Armed Forces of Ukraine
- Type: Military reserve force
- Role: Light infantry
- Part of: Territorial Defense Forces; Operational Command North
- Garrison/HQ: Cherkasy Oblast; MUN А7046
- Patron: Ivan Lyuty-Lyutenko
- Engagements: Russo-Ukrainian war: Russian invasion of Ukraine

Commanders
- Current commander: Lt.Col.Yaroslav Popko (9.07.2024 —)
- Notable commanders: Anatolii Stuzhenko (2018–2024)

Insignia
- Flag

The 118th Territorial Defense Brigade named after Otaman Lyuty-Lyutenko (Ukrainian: 118-та окрема бригада територіальної оборони імені отамана Лютого-Лютенка) is a military formation of the Territorial Defense Forces of Ukraine in Cherkasy Oblast. It is part of Operational Command North.

== History ==
=== Formation ===
On 7 November 2018, the brigade was formed in Cherkasy Oblast. It was created over the course of 3-4 months, based on the existing battalion from Cherkasy, and Colonel Stuzhenko Anatolii was appointed as its commander. The brigade was planned to consist of about 4,000 older reservists, 40–60 years old. The formation included six battalions in Smila, Zolotonosha, Uman, Zhashkiv, Zvenyhorodka, and Cherkasy.

From 5–11 August 2019, the brigade held a large-scale exercise involving headquarters and all six battalions. Troops trained in tactical medicine, engineering training, the basics of topography and communications, and target practice.

On 2 February 2022, commander Colonel Stuzhenko Anatolii announced that the brigade was 70% formed.

=== Russo-Ukrainian war ===
==== Russian invasion of Ukraine ====
During the first week of March, two battalions were fully staffed with reservists.

In April, one brigade unit took part in the battle of Popasna, helping defend the city for 14 days. The brigade's 156th Battalion arrived in Popasna on 19 April 2022 and was placed under the command of the Soledar operational-tactical group of the Khortytsia operational-strategic group. By May 2022, units of the brigade were holding positions near Bakhmut.

The formation was awarded its battle flag on 14 October 2022.

The 157th Territorial Defense Battalion from Zolotonosha operated in the territory of Cherkasy Oblast and was later sent to strengthen neighboring Poltava Oblast. The unit also fought in the battle of Bakhmut, and in February 2023 fought in the battle of Vuhledar.

In January 2023, the brigade's units fought in the battle of Vuhledar.

On 27 April 2023, the brigade's 159th Battalion was placed under the command of the Soledar operational-tactical group and began operating near the village of Klishchiivka outside of Bakhmut. On 29 May, the brigade's 254th Battalion repelled a Russian assault on Ivanivske near Bakhmut.

The brigade's 156th Battalion, based in the city of Cherkasy, took part in the Ukrainian operation in Russia's Kursk region and was based near Sudzha from August 2024 to at least November 2024.

In September 2024 it was reported that units of the brigade were active on the Siversk front and had struck Russian positions in the village of Zolotarivka in the Luhansk Oblast.

On 5 December 2024, the brigade was awarded the honorary title "named after Otaman Lyuty-Lyutenko" by decree of President Volodymyr Zelenskyy.

== Structure ==
As of 2022 the brigade's structure is as follows:

- Headquarters
- 156th Territorial Defense Battalion (Cherkasy) MUN А7322
- 157th Territorial Defense Battalion (Zolotonosha) MUN А7323
- 158th Territorial Defense Battalion (Smila) MUN А7324
- 159th Territorial Defense Battalion (Zvenyhorodka) MUN А7325
- 160th Territorial Defense Battalion (Uman) MUN А7326
- 161th Territorial Defense Battalion (Zhashkiv) MUN А7327
- 254th Territorial Defense Battalion MUN А4756
- Counter-Sabotage Company
- Engineering Company
- Communication Company
- Logistics Company
- Anti-Aircraft Platoon

== Commanders ==
- Colonel Stuzhenko Anatolii: 2018–2024

== See also ==
- Territorial Defense Forces of the Armed Forces of Ukraine
