= Viktor Nikoliuk =

Ukrainian major general

- Віктор Дмитрович Ніколюк
- Nikoliuk in March 2022
- Born: Viktor Dmytrovych Nikoliuk; 19 October 1975 (age 50); Kirovohrad Oblast, Ukrainian SSR
- Military career
- Allegiance: Ukraine (from 1996) (21 years)
- Commands: 169th Training Centre (Ukraine)
- Conflicts: Russo-Ukrainian War; War in Donbas; Russian invasion of Ukraine; Siege of Chernihiv

Viktor Nikoliuk (Ukrainian: Віктор Дмитрович Ніколюк; born October 19, 1975, Kirovohrad Oblast) is a Major General who serves as commander of Operational Command North.

== Information ==
He was born on 19 October 1975 in Kirovohrad Oblast. In 1996 he graduated from Kharkiv Guards High Command Armoured Warfare school, and in 2007, the National Defense University of Ukraine. He later commanded the 92nd Mechanised Brigade.

In August 2014 the brigade's units were involved in an attempt to relieve encircled forces near Ilovaisk. The column stopped in the field for a night and shortly after it was hit by heavy artillery shelling.

On May 16, 2015, near of Shchastia in Luhansk region (sector "A"), soldiers of the 92nd brigade led by Nikoliuk captured soldiers of the 3rd Special Brigade Special Assignment GRU of the Russian Federation Alexander Aleksandrov and Yevgeny Yerofeyev. (See Battle with Russian Spetsnaz near Shchastia for details.) During the battle, a Ukrainian soldier, Junior Sergeant Vadim Pugachev, died. The detainees were citizens of Russia, servicemen of the armed forces of the Russian Federation. On March 29, 2015, the President of Ukraine, Petro Poroshenko decorated the participants in the detention of Russian special forces. Nikoliuk was awarded Order of Bohdan Khmelnytsky of III degree.

On November 3, 2015, Russian-separatist forces opened fire on the base of the 92nd Brigade in the area of the settlement Trokhizbenka, and Nikoliuk was wounded.

On 2016 Viktor Nikoliuk filed a lawsuit with the Supreme Prosecutor's Office in order to compensate for the non-pecuniary damage which, in his opinion, was caused to him by the military prosecutor's office of the ATO forces in the person of one of the investigators and to recognize the illegal decision of the investigator to conduct a search in the military unit В6250.

During the Russo-Ukrainian War, Nikoliuk led Operational Command North in combat near Chernihiv from February–April 2022, and later commanded the Ukrainian troops which defeated a Russian battalion tactical group attempting to cross the Siverskyi Donets River near Bilohorivka, Luhansk Oblast in May 2022.

On 16 April 2026, Nokoliuk became the commander of the Operational Command East.

== See also ==
- Mykhailo Zabrodskyi, Ukrainian politician and retired military officer

== Sources ==
- https://ukrstream.tv/en/videos/commander_of_the_92nd_brigade_there_are_very_few_militias_left_russian_militaries_fight_there
