= 116th Territorial Defense Brigade =

Ukrainian Territorial Defense Forces unit

- Ukrainian: 116-та окрема бригада територіальної оборони
- Active: 25 June 2018 - present
- Country: Ukraine
- Branch: Armed Forces of Ukraine
- Type: Military reserve force
- Role: Light infantry
- Part of: Territorial Defense Forces
- Garrison/HQ: Poltava Oblast; MUN А7044

The 116th Territorial Defense Brigade (Ukrainian: 116-та окрема бригада територіальної оборони) is a military formation of the Territorial Defense Forces of Ukraine in Poltava Oblast. It is part of Operational Command North.

== History ==
=== Formation ===
On 25 June 2018 the brigade was formed in Poltava Oblast. From 25 to 29 September units of brigade took part in large strategic command-staff training "Cossack Volition – 2018". By the end of 2018, more than 4,000 reservist completed rifle days, where they received basic training and instructions on how to fulfill their duties as territorial defense forces.

In June 2019 Brigade held a large scale, 7 day exercise.

On 17 February 2022 Brigade commander Lieutenant colonel Kalentiev Kostiantyn informed that brigade had a core of 300 contract officers, sergeants and soldiers.

=== Russo-Ukrainian War ===
==== 2022 Russian invasion of Ukraine ====
When on 26 February Russian Armed Forces invaded, they reached northeast parts of Poltava Oblast. First battle happened in Vepryk. During the night of 26-27 February units of the brigade, along with various regular Ukrainian Armed Forces formations, destroyed 2 columns in vicinity of Hadiach. On containing 29 vehicles and another 150. For more than 10 days heavy battles raged on border of Poltava and Sumy Oblasts. Each time Russian forces tried to cross Sula river, they were stopped by artillery units of the brigade. In those battles the brigade captured lots of enemy tanks, artillery and anti-aircraft guns. On 9 March the brigade destroyed another enemy column, capturing 3 tanks which were transferred to regular army units. Units of the brigade took part in the liberation of Sumy Oblast. Later, the brigade was involved in 2022 Kharkiv counteroffensive, it remained in Kharkiv region till the end of 2022.

In January 2023 units of the brigade were fighting near Soledar and Bakhmut. Later it was sent to Toretsk. After a short rest and recuperation the brigade saw action near Marinka and Avdiivka.

== Structure ==
As of 2024, the brigade's structure is as follows:

- 116th Territorial Defense Brigade
  - Headquarters
  - 144th Territorial Defense Battalion (Poltava) MUN А7310
    - Aerial Reconnaissance Group "Nightingales" ("Solovey")
  - 145th Territorial Defense Battalion (Kremenchuk) MUN А7311
  - 146th Territorial Defense Battalion (Hadiach) MUN А7312
  - 147th Territorial Defense Battalion (Lubny) MUN А7313
  - 148th Territorial Defense Battalion (Myrhorod) MUN А7314
  - 149th Territorial Defense Battalion (Lokhvytsia) MUN А7315
  - Counter-Sabotage Company
  - Engineering Company
  - Communication Company
  - Logistics Company
  - Mortar Battery

== Commanders ==
- Lieutenant colonel Kalentiev Kostiantyn 2019 - February 2022
- Colonel Chakhlov Oleksandr February 2022 - present

== See also ==
- Territorial Defense Forces of the Armed Forces of Ukraine
