= 117th Territorial Defense Brigade =

Ukrainian Territorial Defense Forces unit

117th Separate Territorial Defense Brigade
- Ukrainian: 117-та окрема бригада територіальної оборони
- Active: 13 April 2018 -
- Country: Ukraine
- Branch: Armed Forces of Ukraine
- Type: Military reserve force
- Role: Light infantry
- Part of: Territorial Defense Forces
- Garrison/HQ: Sumy Oblast; MUN А7045
- Engagements: War in Donbas; Russian Invasion of Ukraine: Pokrovsk offensive; Kursk offensive (2024–2025)

Insignia
- Flag

BMP-2 of the Brigade

The 117th Separate Territorial Defense Brigade (Ukrainian: 117-та окрема бригада територіальної оборони) is a military formation of the Territorial Defense Forces of Ukraine in Sumy Oblast. It is part of Operational Command North.

== History ==
=== Formation ===
On 13 April 2018, the brigade was formed in Sumy Oblast. Colonel Yurii Polous was the commander. During 27 September to 7 October, a ten-day exercise was held for a planned 25 percent of reserves.

On 3 December 2021, Colonel Serhii Kyrian was appointed as a new commander.

On 17 February 2022, the brigade was taking in more recruits.

=== Russo-Ukrainian War ===
==== 2022 Russian invasion of Ukraine ====
In early March, soldiers of the brigade captured Russian Т-90А, T-72B3M obr.2016 tanks and UR-77 Meteorit mine clearing vehicle. In April, after the Russian withdrawal from northern Ukraine, soldiers of the brigade's 150th Battalion captured Russian tanks that had been abandoned near the Russia–Ukraine border.

On 27 August 2022, the brigade received its battle flag.

During the Pokrovsk offensive in 2024, the brigade came under the threat of encirclement.

The brigade participated in the Kursk offensive of 2024 to 2025.

== Structure ==
As of 2022 the brigade's structure is as follows:

- Headquarters
- 150th Territorial Defense Battalion (Sumy) MUN А7316
- 151st Territorial Defense Battalion (Konotop) MUN А7317
- 152nd Territorial Defense Battalion (Romny) MUN А7318
- 153rd Territorial Defense Battalion (Shostka) MUN А7319
- 154th Territorial Defense Battalion (Okhtyrka) MUN А7320
- 155th Territorial Defense Battalion (Stepanivka) MUN А7321
- Engineering Company
- Communication Company
- Logistics Company
- Mortar Battery

== Commanders ==
Sumy Regiment flag

- Colonel Yurii Polous (2018 - 2020)
- Colonel Serhii Kyrian (3 Dec 2021-2023)
- 2023–present: Colonel Maksym Aksamytovskyi

== Insignia ==
Emblem shows a silver Theotokos on a golden crescent, which was a part of Sumy Regiment flag during the Sloboda Ukraine.

== See also ==
- Territorial Defense Forces of the Armed Forces of Ukraine
