= 241st Territorial Defense Brigade =

Ukrainian Territorial Defense Forces unit

- Ukrainian: 241-ша окрема бригада територіальної оборони
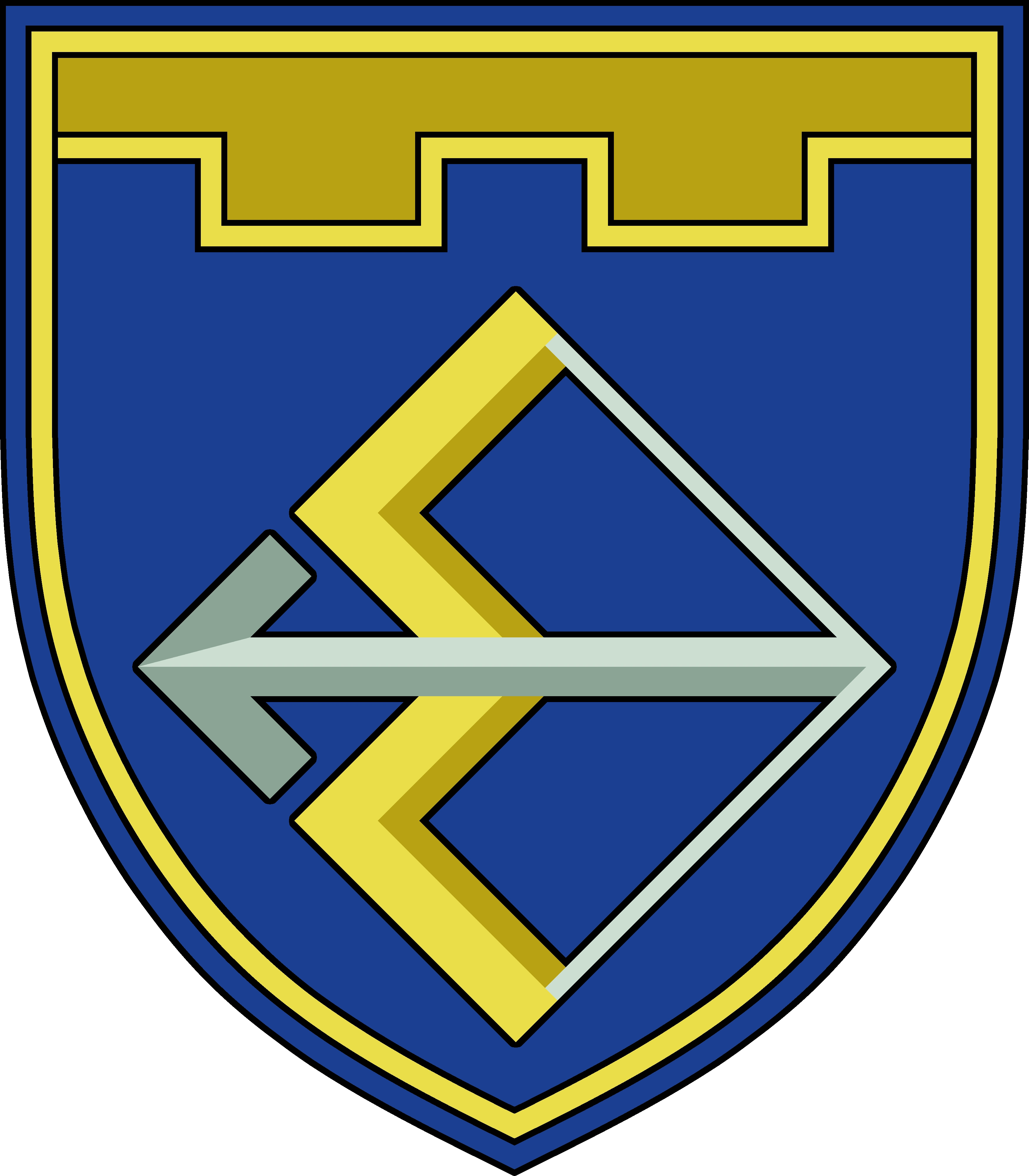
- Active: 14 April 2022 - present
- Country: Ukraine
- Branch: Armed Forces of Ukraine
- Type: Military reserve force
- Role: Light infantry
- Part of: Territorial Defense Forces; Operational Command North
- Garrison/HQ: Kyiv; MUN А4076
- Engagements: Russo-Ukrainian War; 2024 Kursk offensive

Insignia
- Flag

The 241st Territorial Defense Brigade (Ukrainian: 241-ша окрема бригада територіальної оборони, romanized: 241-sha okrema bryhada terytorialnoi oborony) is a military formation of the Territorial Defense Forces of Ukraine in Kyiv. It is part of Operational Command North.

== History ==
=== Formation ===
On 14 April 2022 the brigade was formed in Kyiv. Commander-in-Chief of the Armed Forces of Ukraine Valerii Zaluzhnyi issued a decree that transformed 241st Territorial Defense Battalion of the 112th Kyiv City Defense Brigade into the headquarters of new brigade.

Battalions 130, 204, 205, 206, 207 came from 112th Kyiv City Defense Brigade which grew too large, numbering at least 11 battalions. 243rd Battalion came from 114th Kyiv Oblast Defense Brigade. Colonel Pisotskyi Eduard military call sign "Kovalskyi" became its commander, having previously commanded 131st Territorial Defense Battalion of the 112th Kyiv City Defense Brigade.

130th Territorial Defense Battalion already existed in Solomianskyi District during 2021 when it was part of the 112th Kyiv City Defense Brigade and was actively training soldiers.

207th Territorial Defense Battalion began forming in January and was formed on 27 February 2022. It was commanded by Yushko Viktor.

242nd Territorial Defense Battalion was formed on 25 February.

243rd Territorial Defense Battalion was formed from soldiers of other battalions who took part in the defense of Kyiv.

=== Russo-Ukrainian War ===
==== Russian invasion of Ukraine ====
130th Territorial Defense Battalion took part in defense of Zhuliany Airport. Later the battalion was involved in Battle of Irpin. After helping liberate Kyiv Oblast, battalion moved on to Kharkiv Oblast. on or about 11 September battalion liberated Hoptivka. Battalion lost 18 soldiers while fighting in Kharkiv Oblast. By the end of 2022 battalion was fighting near Bilohorivka, Luhansk Oblast.

204th Territorial Defense Battalion fought in Battle of Bakhmut during December. As of February 2023 battalion along with 205th and 206 was still in Bakhmut. Ministry of Defence of the Russian Federation on 29 August 2022 claimed that 204th battalion sustained over 60% casualties.

205th Territorial Defense Battalion fought in Battle of Sievierodonetsk, then it was stationed near Sloviansk.

On 14 April, the brigade's 206th Territorial Defense Battalion was transferred to the command of Mykolaiv Oblast's 123rd Territorial Defense Brigade, in order to strengthen the defense of the city of Mykolaiv. The 206th's 1st Company took up the defense of the villages of Halytsynove and Prybuzke, while its 3rd Company was deployed to the southern outskirts of the city near the village of Ukraiinka. In June, a company of the 206th was deployed to support the 124th Territorial Defense Brigade's 196th Battalion near Tavriiske and Oleksandrivka in Kherson Oblast. The 206th Battalion continued to fight near Mykolaiv in August. It was stationed near Vovchansk in January 2023. Afterwards, it was sent to Bakhmut.

Ministry of Defence of the Russian Federation on 17 July 2022 claimed that 242nd Battalions command posts was destroyed near Derhachi.

243rd Battalion fought in Opytne and Klishchiivka near Bakhmut.

On 2 October, the brigade received its battle flag.

In November brigade commander Colonel Pisotskyi Eduard announced that close to half of his brigade was deployed in north to border with Belarus, Kharkiv Oblast, Kherson Oblast and Mykolaiv Oblast.

Mobile air defense units are stationed near Kyiv, destroying enemy drones which try to attack critical infrastructure of the capital. On 12 April 2023 Kyiv City Mayor Vitali Klitschko awarded medals to soldiers from 242nd Battalion who recently were rotated from the front. Both 207th and 251st Battalions were serving near Bakhmut in spring of 2023.

On 19 April 2023 Come Back Alive foundation announced that brigade received 3 pick-up trucks, radios, generators, Starlink terminals and other equipment for the "Long arms of TrO" project deigned to give 120 mm mortars to those units.

== Structure ==
As of 2022 the brigade's structure is as follows:

=== Battalions ===
Badge	Name	District	Code
	130th Territorial Defense Battalion	Solomianskyi District	MUN А7296
	204th Territorial Defense Battalion	Holosiivskyi District	MUN А7373
	205th Territorial Defense Battalion	Pecherskyi District	MUN А7374
	206th Territorial Defense Battalion	Podilskyi District	MUN А7375
	207th Territorial Defense Battalion	Shevchenkivskyi District	MUN А7376
	242nd Territorial Defense Battalion	Holosiivskyi District
	243rd Territorial Defense Battalion	Solomianskyi District	MUN А4247
	251st Territorial Defense Battalion		MUN А4643
	252nd Territorial Defense Battalion		MUN А4659

=== Companies ===
- Counter-Sabotage Company
- Engineering Company
- Communication Company
- Logistics Company
- Mortar Battery

== Commanders ==
- Colonel Pisotskyi Eduard military call sign "Kovalskyi" 2022–2023
- Colonel Vsevolod Pavlikov 2023
- Colonel Vadym Ozirnyi 2023–June 2024
- Colonel Oleksandr Voloshyn 10 June 2024–present

== Notable members ==
- Taras Topolia, leader of musical group Antytila
- Yurii Hudymenko, politician, leader of Democratic Axe party
- Yurii Biriukov, volunteer, former advisor to President Petro Poroshenko
- Akhtem Seitablayev, actor, screenwriter and film director of the Crimean Tatar origin
- Yuriy Lutsenko, former Prosecutor General of Ukraine and Minister of Internal Affairs
- Taras Kompanichenko, folk musician
- Artem Chekh, writer and journalist
- Serhiy Kostynskyi, journalist and political adviser

== See also ==
- Territorial Defense Forces of the Armed Forces of Ukraine
