= Volodymyr Kravchenko (general) =

Ukrainian general

- Володимир Анатолійович Кравченко
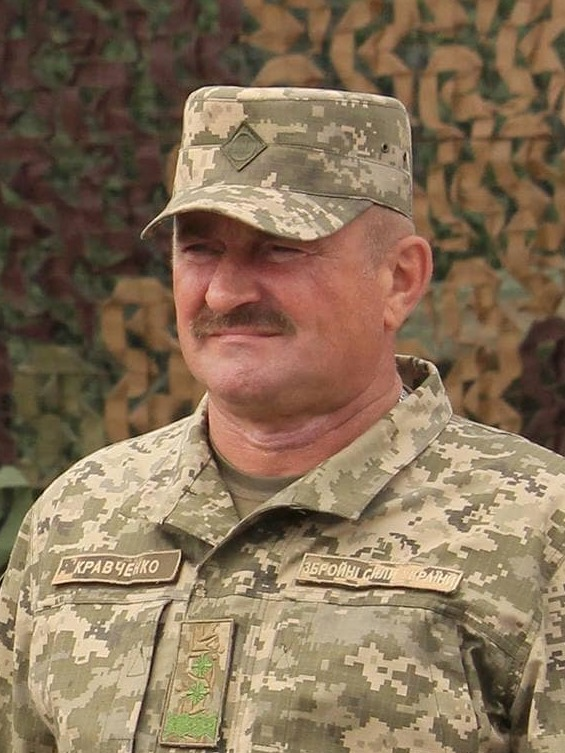
- Born: Voldoymyr Anaotilyovych Kravchenko; Chernihiv, Ukraine, Soviet Union
- Spouse: Lyubov Kravchenko
- Children: 2 sons
- Military career
- Allegiance: Soviet Union; Ukraine
- Branch: Ukrainian Ground Forces
- Service years: ????(not later than 2009)-present
- Rank: Lieutenant general
- Commands: Operational Command North (2017-2019)

Volodymyr Anatoliyovych Kravchenko (Ukrainian: Володимир Анатолійович Кравченко), is a Ukrainian military officer holding the rank of lieutenant general. He is the former commander of the Ukrainian Armed Forces, a position which he held from 2019 to 2021. He had served as the Commander of the Operational Command North from 2017 to 2019.

== Biography ==
Voldoymyr Kravchenko was born in Chernihiv.

Until 2009, he was the commander of the 51st separate mechanized brigade.

From the beginning of the war in Donbas, he headed sector A (Luhansk region), then he led the troops in the ATO and OOS zone.

In 5 December 2014, he became a Major General.

Until 2017, he worked as the chief of staff of the operational command "North" of the ground forces.

That same year, Kravchenko was the commander of the Operational Command North.

On 23 August 2018, he was promoted to Lieutenant General.

After the ATO changed to the OOS, from May to November 2018 he commanded the Pivnich Operational Tactical Group, which is responsible for the contact line in the Luhansk Oblast and on the Svitlodar arc in the Donetsk Oblast.

On 5 August 2019, President of Ukraine Volodymyr Zelenskyy appointed Kravchenko commander of the Joint Forces Operation.

On 28 July 2021, he was dismissed from the post of commander of the combined forces. In 2022, commanded Dnipro operational group, Volyn operational-tactical group, in 2023, Sumy operational-tactical group during Russian invasion of Ukraine.

== Family ==
He is married to his wife, Lyubov Kravchenko, and has two sons, Ihor and Oleksandr.
