= 1020th Anti-aircraft Missile Regiment (Ukraine) =

- 1020-й зенітний ракетний полк
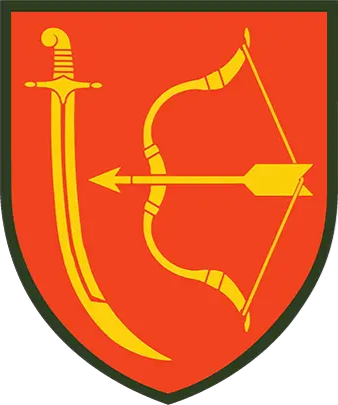
- Regiment insignia
- Founded: 2022
- Country: Ukraine
- Allegiance: Ministry of Defence
- Branch: Ukrainian Ground Forces
- Type: Ground based Air Defense Forces
- Role: Air Defense
- Garrison/HQ: Poltava
- Engagements: Russo-Ukrainian War; War in Donbass; Russian invasion of Ukraine; Northern Ukraine campaign; Eastern Ukraine campaign

1020th Anti-Aircraft Missile Regiment (MUN A4647) is a regiment level military unit of the Ukrainian Ground Forces, operationally under the command of Main Operational Command. The Regiment is based in Poltava. It has seen combat during the Russian invasion of Ukraine being established in 2022.

== History ==
It was established on 25 October 2022 during the Russian invasion of Ukraine in Poltava Oblast. A soldier of the regiment (Yaroslav Yaroslavovich Mankiv) was killed in August 2023 as result of mortar shelling in Kramatorsk. In September 2023, it received a Renault minivan. In February 2024, Oleksandr Usyk raised 85,000 UAH for the regiment vy auctioning off his "Colors of Freedom" shirt. On 25 October 2024, a contract for the production of 70 Besomar3210 strike-interceptor UAVs for the regiment to combat Shahed, Orlan, Supercam and ZALA Lancets was signed by the Kozytskyi Charity Foundation which were transferred on 24 February 2025 by the Kozytskyi foundation to the regiment. The regiment is also a part of the "Come back alive" Drone crash program.

== Structure ==
The struggle of the regiment is as follows:

- Management and Headquarters
- 1st Anti-aircraft Missile Division
- 2nd Anti-aircraft Missile Division
- 3rd Anti-aircraft Missile Division
- Repair Company
- Engineering Company
- Logistics Company
- Commandant Platoon
