= Vasyl Osypchuk =

Ukrainian military personnel

- Василь Миколайович Осипчук
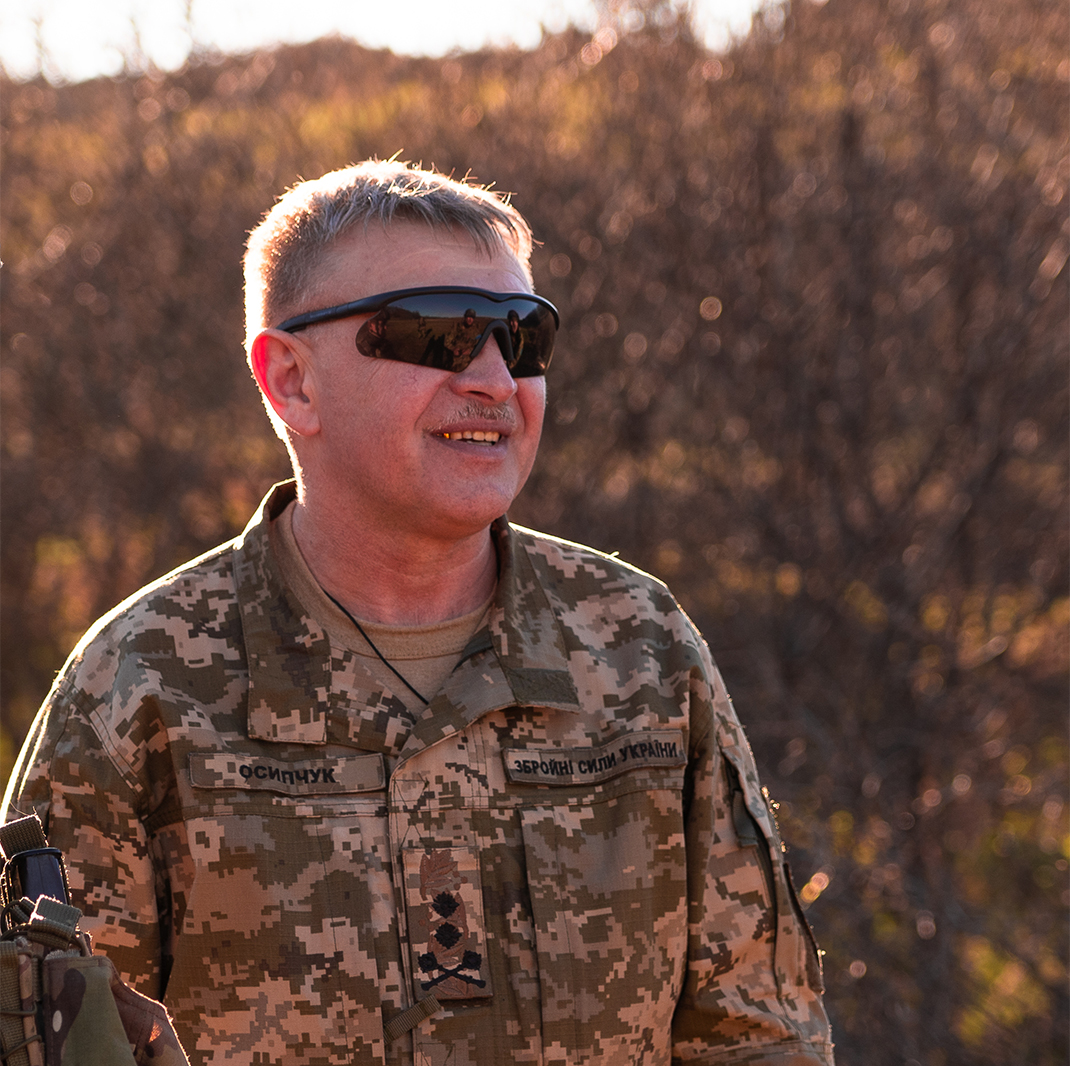
- Osypchuk in 2024
- Born: Vasyl Mykolayovych Osypchuk; 1969 (age 56–57); Soviet Union
- Military career
- Allegiance: Soviet Union; Ukraine
- Branch: Ukrainian Ground Forces
- Service years: ????-present
- Rank: Major general
- Commands: Sumy operational-tactical group (2023); Operational Command North (2019)
- Conflicts: Russo-Ukrainian war

Major General Vasyl Mykolayovych Osypchuk (Ukrainian: Василь Миколайович Осипчук; born in 1969), is a Ukrainian army officer who had been the acting commander of the Operational Command North in 2019.

He had also been the deputy commander of the forces of the Operational Command North of the Ground Forces of the Armed Forces of Ukraine, as a participant in the Russo-Ukrainian War. He is currently ranked as a Major General.

== Biography ==
Vasyl Osypchuk was born in 1969.

He graduated from a military school back in the Soviet Union.

After the annexation of Crimea and the start of hostilities in the Donbas, he volunteered for the Military Commissariat and later headed the 10th Territorial Defense Battalion in the Zhytomyr Oblast.

In his interview, he view on the entire war changed after the Euromaidan, implying that "the army as such was almost gone, people with acquaintances were growing in positions. In order to have a career, you had to earn a living. I didn't want that."

In mid-July 2014, Osypchuk and his unit went to defend the demarcation line with Crimea in the Kherson Oblast. And in the winter of 2015, he found himself in the ATO zone. Subsequently, in the same year, the 59th separate motorized infantry brigade was formed on the base of the battalion, led by Osypchuk.

On 7 July 2018, Osypchuk was the deputy commander of the Operational Command North of the Ground Forces of the Armed Forces of Ukraine.

On 3 May 2019, by presidential decree, Osypchuk was promoted to major general of the Armed Forces of Ukraine.

From August to December 2019, he was the acting commander of the Operational Command North.
