= 109th Territorial Defense Brigade =

Ukrainian Territorial Defense Forces unit

- Ukrainian: 109-та окрема бригада територіальної оборони
- Active: 1 July 2018 - present
- Country: Ukraine
- Branch: Armed Forces of Ukraine
- Type: Military reserve force
- Role: Light infantry
- Part of: Territorial Defense Forces; Operational Command East
- Garrison/HQ: Donetsk Oblast; MUN А7037

Insignia
- Flag

The 109th Territorial Defense Brigade (Ukrainian: 109-та окрема бригада територіальної оборони) is a military formation of the Territorial Defense Forces of Ukraine in Donetsk Oblast. It is part of Operational Command East.

== History ==
=== Formation ===
Pavlo Zhebrivskyi, the head of Donetsk Oblast military-civilian administration, announced on 27 April 2018 that a brigade would be formed in Donetsk Oblast. Its battalions were planned to be stationed in Kramatorsk, Bakhmut, and Pokrovsk, with an additional two battalions located in Mariupol. On 1 July 2018, the brigade was formed in Donetsk Oblast. 3,500 soldiers aged twenty-five to sixty-years old signed 3-5 year contracts. It was planned for six battalions to take part in five days of exercises in Bakhmut starting on 25 September. The battalions were stationed in Mariupol, Bakhmut, Pokrovsk, Kramatorsk, Marinka and Volnovakha.

The brigade's 104th Defense Battalion was made up of reservists from Bakhmut, Chasiv Yar, Kostiantynivka, Kramatorsk, Toretsk and Sloviansk.

=== Russo-Ukrainian War ===
==== 2022 Russian invasion of Ukraine ====
The 104th Defense Battalion fought in Bakhmut from 24 February to November. From December to January 2023, the battalion was moved to Sumy Oblast to help protect the Russia–Ukraine border. In January and February, the battalion was involved in combat near Kreminna.

The 106th Territorial Defense Battalion took part in the recapture of the city of Lyman, where nine of its soldiers were killed in battle.

In April 2023, brigade commander Colonel Anatolii Vyshnevskyi stated that units of the brigade had fought in Lyman, Bahmut, Avdiivka, Vodiane, Marinka, Vuhledar and Mariupol. He also stated that 54 prisoners of war had returned home.

== Structure ==
As of 2024, the brigade's structure is as follows:

- Headquarters (Mariupol)
- 104th Territorial Defense Battalion (Bakhmut) MUN А7270
- 105th Territorial Defense Battalion (Volnovakha) MUN А7271
- 106th Territorial Defense Battalion (Kramatorsk) MUN А7272
- 107th Territorial Defense Battalion (Mariupol) MUN А7273
- 108th Territorial Defense Battalion (Marinka) MUN А7274
- 109th Territorial Defense Battalion (Pokrovsk) MUN А7275
- FPV Drone Group "Muramasa"
- Engineering Company
- Communication Company
- Logistics Company
- Mortar Battery

Seal of Kalmius Palanka.

== Commanders ==
- Colonel Andrii Haldak 2018 – 2019
- Colonel Anatolii Vyshnevskyi 2022 - present

== Insignia ==
The brigade's emblem shows a crossed silver spear with a sabre. This image was used as a seal for Kalmius Palanka, a territorial district within the organization of the Zaporozhian Host the Lower, current territory of Donetsk Oblast.

== See also ==
- Territorial Defense Forces of the Armed Forces of Ukraine
