= Oleh Mikats =

- Олег Михайлович Мікац
- Born: Oleh Mykhalovych Mikats; 23 October 1975 (age 51); Zviahel, Ukraine, Soviet Union
- Military career
- Allegiance: Ukraine
- Branch: Ukrainian Ground Forces
- Service years: 1996–present
- Rank: Major General
- Commands: Operation Command East
- Conflicts: Russo-Ukrainian War

Major General Oleh Mykhalovych Mikats (Ukrainian: Олег Михайлович Мікац; born 23 October 1975), is a Ukrainian army officer who is the commander of the Operational Command "East" since 9 August 2021.

Mikats had served as the deputy commander of the Operational Command West from 2020 to 2021, and had been the commander of the forces of the OTU "Luhansk". Mikats was one of the leaders of the defense of Donetsk airport during the Russo-Ukrainian War.

In October 2022, he was included in the list of the 25 most influential Ukrainian military men from the Ministry of Defense.

Mikats is the first Ukrainian general who never served in the Soviet army.

== Biography ==
Oleg Mikats was born in Novohrad-Volynskyi, Zhytomyr Oblast on 23 October 1975.

In 1992, he graduated from the local secondary school No. 9, and entered the Kharkiv Guards Higher Tank Command School. He began his officer career in 1996 as a platoon commander, and as of 2001, he commanded a company of the 30th Guards Tank Division. He graduated with honors from the National Defense Academy of Ukraine.

In 2005, he served in the military as part of the Ukrainian peacekeeping contingent in Iraq as a translator of the operational department.

In 2008, he continued his education at the National Defense Academy of Ukraine.

For several years, he held the position of deputy chief of the 169th training center of the Ground Forces of the Armed Forces of Ukraine. In 2012, he temporarily performed the duties of the head of the center.

In 2013, he was appointed commander of the 93rd separate mechanized brigade.

During the war in eastern Ukraine, the 93rd mechanized brigade under Mikats' leadership took an active part in the confrontation with pro-Russian armed groups and Russian troops. On 10 July 2014, units of the brigade, in cooperation with volunteer battalions, accepted the battle near Karlivka, and on 24 July, they took control of the villages of Pisky and Pervomaiske, which allowed Ukrainian troops to control the road between Donetsk and Dnipropetrovsk.

Since September 2014, Mikats has been in charge of the defense of the Donetsk airport, and he is called one of the key commanders in these battles.

In addition to the direct defense of the airport, the fighters of the 93rd brigade also performed other front-line tasks: on 6 November, the 93rd brigade, together with the fighters of the Ukrainian Armed Forces, returned the village of Opytne to the control of Ukraine, and on November 19, they participated in repelling the fighters from an important height near the airport. Since March 2015, he is the head of the 169th educational center "Desna". As of August 2015, he became a major general. Thus, Mikats became the first Ukrainian general who never served in the Soviet army.

In March 2017, he was appointed the deputy commander of the Operational Command West.

Later that year, as deputy commander, as Mikats was appointed Commander of the Luhansk Operational Tactical Group, which was later reformed into the North Operational Tactical Group in 2019.

In 2020, he was promoted the chief of staff of the Operational Command West while retaining his position as deputy commander. On 9 August 2021, by order of the Minister of Defense, Mikats was appointed the commander of the operational command "East".

== Political activity ==
In the extraordinary parliamentary elections of 2014, he was number three on the list of the "Right Sector party», which failed to overcome the 5% barrier, which is why Mikats did not get into the Verkhovna Rada.
