= Huiva, Zhytomyr Oblast =

Rural locality in Zhytomyr Oblast, Ukraine

Coordinates: 50°12′39″N 28°39′31″E

Huiva Гуйва
- Rural settlement
- Location within Zhytomyr Oblast Location within Ukraine
- Country: Ukraine
- Oblast: Zhytomyr Oblast
- Raion: Zhytomyr Raion
- Time zone: UTC+2 (EET)
  - Summer (DST): UTC+3 (EEST)

Huiva (Ukrainian: Гуйва) is a rural settlement in Zhytomyr Raion, Zhytomyr Oblast, Ukraine. Population: 1,656 (2022 estimate) In 2001, population was 698.

== History ==
Until 26 January 2024, Huiva was designated urban-type settlement. On this day, a new law entered into force which abolished this status, and Huiva became a rural settlement.
