= 110th Territorial Defense Brigade =

Ukrainian Territorial Defense Forces unit

- Ukrainian: 110-та окрема бригада територіальної оборони
- Active: 1 July 2018 - present
- Country: Ukraine
- Branch: Armed Forces of Ukraine
- Type: Military reserve force
- Role: Light infantry
- Part of: Territorial Defense Forces; Operational Command East
- Garrison/HQ: Zaporizhzhia Oblast; MUN А7038

Insignia
- Flag

The 110th Territorial Defense Brigade "Khortytsia" (Ukrainian: 110-та окрема бригада територіальної оборони) is a military formation of the Territorial Defense Forces of Ukraine in Zaporizhzhia Oblast. It is part of Operational Command East.

Since November 1, 2025 the Brigade has been renumbered. Now it is the 260th Territorial Defense Brigade "Khortytsia"

== History ==
=== Formation ===
In December 2018, soldiers of the brigade began taking part in oath ceremonies. The brigade had planned to have close to 2,700 serviceman divided between six battalions located in Zaporizhzhia, Melitopol, Berdiansk, Polohy, and Kamianka-Dniprovska.

On 14 February 2022, the brigade had 75% of its positions filled.

=== Russo-Ukrainian War ===
==== 2022 Russian invasion of Ukraine ====
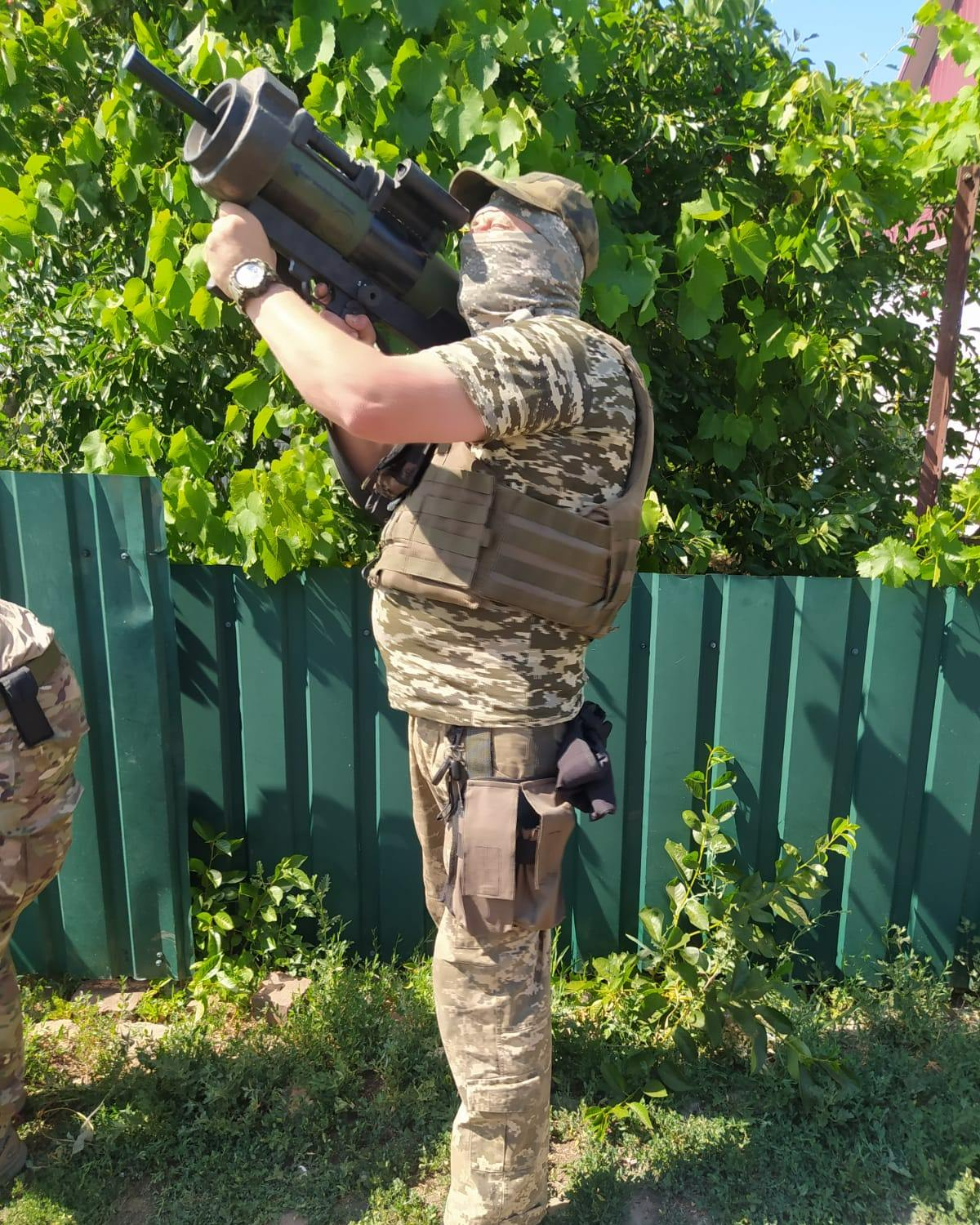
110th Territorial Defense Brigade of Zaporizhzhia Region showing M240 machine gun, AT4 and MATADOR

The brigade was assigned to the southern defense sector on the evening of 25 February. Since brigade did not have any equipment, it was not tasked with the defense of Melitopol.

Towards the end of April 2022, commander Viacheslav Vlasenko was removed from his position. On 2 October, the brigade received its battle flag.

On 14 July 2025, the brigade was awarded the honorary title "Khortytsia" by decree of President Volodymyr Zelenskyy.

== Structure ==
As of 2022 the brigade's structure is as follows:

- Headquarters
- 111th Territorial Defense Battalion (Berdiansk) MUN А7277
- 112th Territorial Defense Battalion (Kamianka-Dniprovska) MUN А7278
- 113th Territorial Defense Battalion (Enerhodar) MUN А7279
- 114th Territorial Defense Battalion (Zaporizhzhia) MUN А7280
- 115th Territorial Defense Battalion (Melitopol) MUN А7281
- 116th Territorial Defense Battalion (Polohy) MUN А7282
- Engineering Company
- Communication Company
- Logistics Company
- Mortar Battery

== Commanders ==
- Colonel Yevhenii Shcherban - 2021
- Lieutenant Colonel Volodymyr Losiev - 2022
- Colonel Viacheslav Vlasenko – April 2022
- Colonel Oleksandr Ihnatiev 2022–present

== See also ==
- Territorial Defense Forces of the Armed Forces of Ukraine
