= 30th Mechanized Brigade (Ukraine) =

Ukrainian Ground Forces formation

30th Mechanized Brigade (2016–present) 30th Guards Mechanized Brigade (2004–2016) 30th Guards Tank Division (1957–2004) 11th Guards Mechanised Division (1945–1957) 13th Guards Cavalry Division (1943–1945) 83rd Cavalry Division (1941–1943)
- Ukrainian: 30-та окрема механізована бригада імені князя Костянтина Острозького
- 30th Mechanized Brigade shoulder sleeve insignia
- Active: 1 September 1941 – present
- Country: Soviet Union (1941 – 6 Dec 1991); Ukraine (6 Dec 1991 – present)
- Branch: Ukrainian Ground Forces
- Type: Mechanized Infantry
- Size: Brigade
- Part of: Operational Command North; 11th Army Corps
- Garrison/HQ: Zviahel; MUN A0409
- Patron: Konstanty Ostrogski
- Motto: Dei Gratia
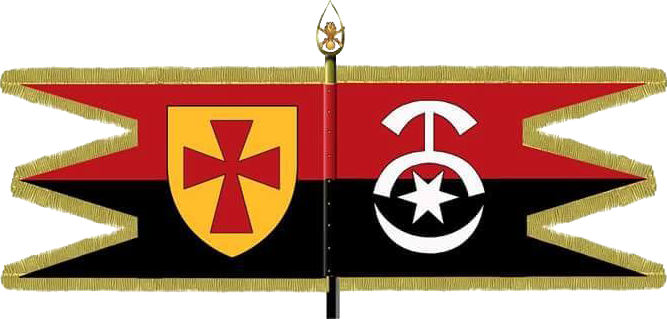
- Colours: Garrison guidon:
- Engagements: World War II; Cold War; Russo-Ukrainian War; War in Donbas; Invasion of Ukraine; 2022 Chornobaivka attacks; Battle of the Siverskyi Donets; Battle of Bakhmut; 2023 Ukrainian counteroffensive; Kupiansk offensive
- Decorations: Order of the Red Banner (removed); Order of Suvorov (removed) For Courage and Bravery
- Battle honours: Guards (removed); Novohrad-Volynskyi (removed); Rivne (removed)

Commanders
- Current commander: Lieutenant colonel Yevhen Kochervei
- Notable commanders: Pyotr Zubov; Mykhailo Mnyshenko; Petro Lytvyn

The 30th Prince Konstanty Ostrogski Mechanized Brigade is a formation of the Ukrainian Ground Forces. The full name of the unit is 30th Independent Mechanized Brigade "Konstanty Ostrogski".

Following the 2014 war in Donbas, the unit dropped all its Soviet decorations.

== History ==
=== World War II ===
Between September 1 and October 1, 1941, the 83rd Cavalry Division was formed in the city of Samarkand, Uzbekistan.

The division consisted of the following units:

- 215th Cavalry Regiment
- 226th Cavalry Regiment
- 231st Cavalry Regiment
- Separate Chemical Squadron

From September 5, 1941, the commanding officer of the division was Lieutenant General Selivanov.

On November 7, 1941, the division was sent to the Volga Military District where it was assigned to the newly forming Cavalry mechanized group of the 61st Army. Until December 28, 1941, the division was fortifying near the station of Lysi Gory Saratov Oblast.

The first battle that the division took part in was near the city of Ryazhsk, Ryazan Oblast as part of the Cavalry mechanized group of the 61st Army as part of the Bryansk Front and the Soviet winter counter offensive in front of Moscow. In January 1942 the division was assigned to the 7th Cavalry Corps and was assigned to be a Mobile Group in the Moscow Defense Zone for the 61st Army. The division remained with the 7th Cavalry Corps for the rest of 1942 and when the Corps was redesignated as the 6th Guards Cavalry Corps in January 1943 the division became the 13th Guards Cavalry Division on 19 January 1943. The division was under the command of General Major Pyotr Zubov.

The 13th Guards Cavalry Division fought at Dubno in 1944, as well as at the Battle of Debrecen and was with 6th Guards Cavalry Corps of the 2nd Ukrainian Front in May 1945.

=== Cold War ===
Feskov et al. trace the unit's history as follows. At the beginning of June, the division relocated to Novohrad-Volynskyi. On 1 August 1945, the division was converted into the 11th Guards Mechanized Division. During November and December 1956, the division fought in the crushing of the Hungarian Revolution of 1956. 44 soldiers of the division were killed during the campaign in Hungary. The division moved back to Novohrad-Volynskyi in January 1957.

On 4 June 1957 it became the 30th Guards Tank Division, part of the 8th Tank Army. In 1960, the division's 58th Separate Tank Training Battalion was disbanded. On 19 February 1962 the 335th Separate Missile Battalion and the 108th Separate Equipment Maintenance and Recovery Battalion were activated. In 1968 the 151st Separate Guards Sapper Battalion became the 151st Separate Guards Engineer-Sapper Battalion. The 1043rd Separate Material Supply Battalion was created from the motor transport battalion in 1980. During the Cold War, the division was maintained at 25% strength. In November 1990, the division was equipped with 224 T-72 main battle tanks.

=== 1990–present ===
The 30th Guards Tank Division, along with the rest of the 8th Tank Army and the Carpathian Military District, became part of the Ukrainian Ground Forces according to the order of Ukraine About Armed Forces of Ukraine from December 6, 1991. In February 1992, all units of the division pledged their allegiance to Ukraine.

It was still designated a tank division as of Decree N 350/93 (August 21, 1993). On October 20, 1999, the division was awarded the Novohrad-Volynskyi designation. On July 30, 2004, the division was reformed into a brigade.

As of 2006, the brigade was the only mechanized brigade that did not have any conscripts. It is also a part of Joint Rapid Reaction Forces. Over a hundred soldiers from the brigade have served in peacekeeping missions in Sierra Leone, Lebanon, Iraq and Kosovo.

A battalion of the brigade was part of POLUKRBAT in the 2006 rotation. As of October 12, 2007, the 2nd Mechanized Battalion of the brigade was deployed in Kosovo as part of the POLUKRBAT.

The commander of the brigade served as a commander of the 5th Mechanized Brigade in Iraq.

== Russo-Ukrainian War ==
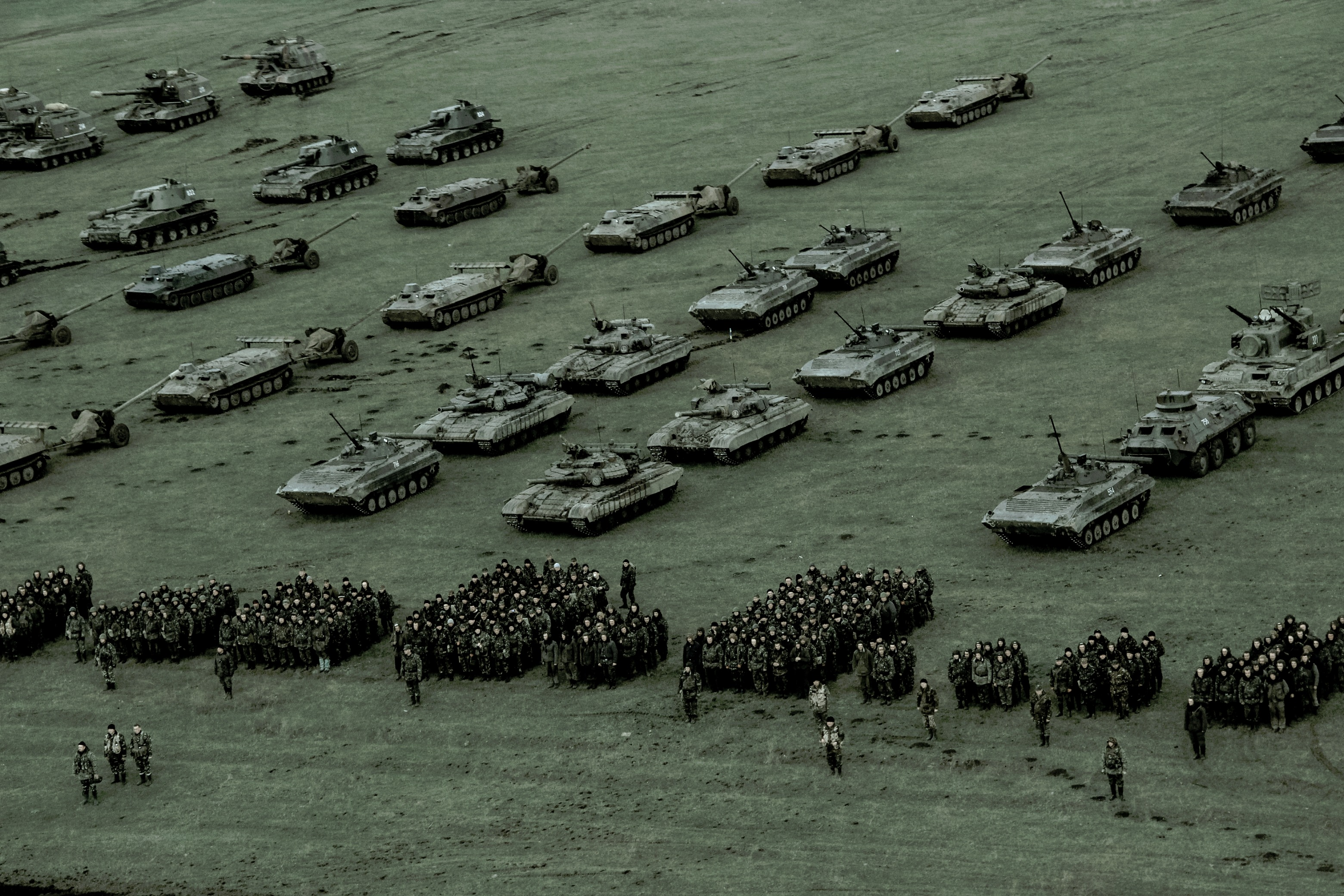
Personnel and equipment of the 30th Mechanized Brigade at the Shyrokyi Lan training area} in April 2014

=== War in Donbas ===
In the spring of 2014, after the annexation of Crimea by the Russian Federation, the 30th Mechanized Brigade, one of the five brigades of the armed forces of Ukraine at the time, was sent to the south, including to the Berdiansk region, to protect against a possible invasion of mainland from Crimea. At the time, the brigade was manned by contract soldiers.

The brigade participated in the armed conflict in the east of Ukraine. In the summer of 2014, the brigade took part in the battles for Savur-Mohyla.

In 2015 the brigade took part in the Battle of Debaltseve during the war in Donbas.

On 18 November 2015 the Soviet decorations of the brigade's full name (30th Separate Guards Mechanized Novohrad-Volynskyi Rivne Orders of the Red Banner and Suvorov Brigade) were removed, leaving the full name of 30th Separate Guards Mechanized Novohrad-Volynskyi Rivne Brigade. On 22 August 2016, its Guards title was also removed.

As part of Ukrainian Independence Day celebrations on August 24, 2018, the brigade received the new honorific "Konstanty Ostrogski".

As of 1 March 2020, the brigade had lost 178 people during the war in Donbas.

=== 2022 Russian invasion of Ukraine ===
In early May 2022, units of the 30th Mechanized Brigade conducted mortar strikes against Russian positions in Chornobaivka. Ukrainian officials characterized these as the eighteenth in a series of strikes on Russian targets in the area since the Russian invasion of Ukraine.

From 5-13 May 2022, tanks from the 30th Mechanized Brigade repelled a river crossing by the Russian 74th Separate Guards Motor Rifle Brigade near Dronivka. This action was part of a battle on the Siverskyi Donets river that saw the destruction of 80 pieces of equipment and of the estimated 550 Russian servicemembers conducting the operation, 485 were casualties. The battle is considered one of the "deadliest single engagements" of the war at that point.

In October 2022, the brigade published footage of its operations against Russian forces in the "Bakhmut direction". During June 2023, the brigade was still operating near Bakhmut, amid counteroffensive operations in the area. As of July 2023, units of the brigade remained active in the "Bakhmut direction".

== Gallery ==
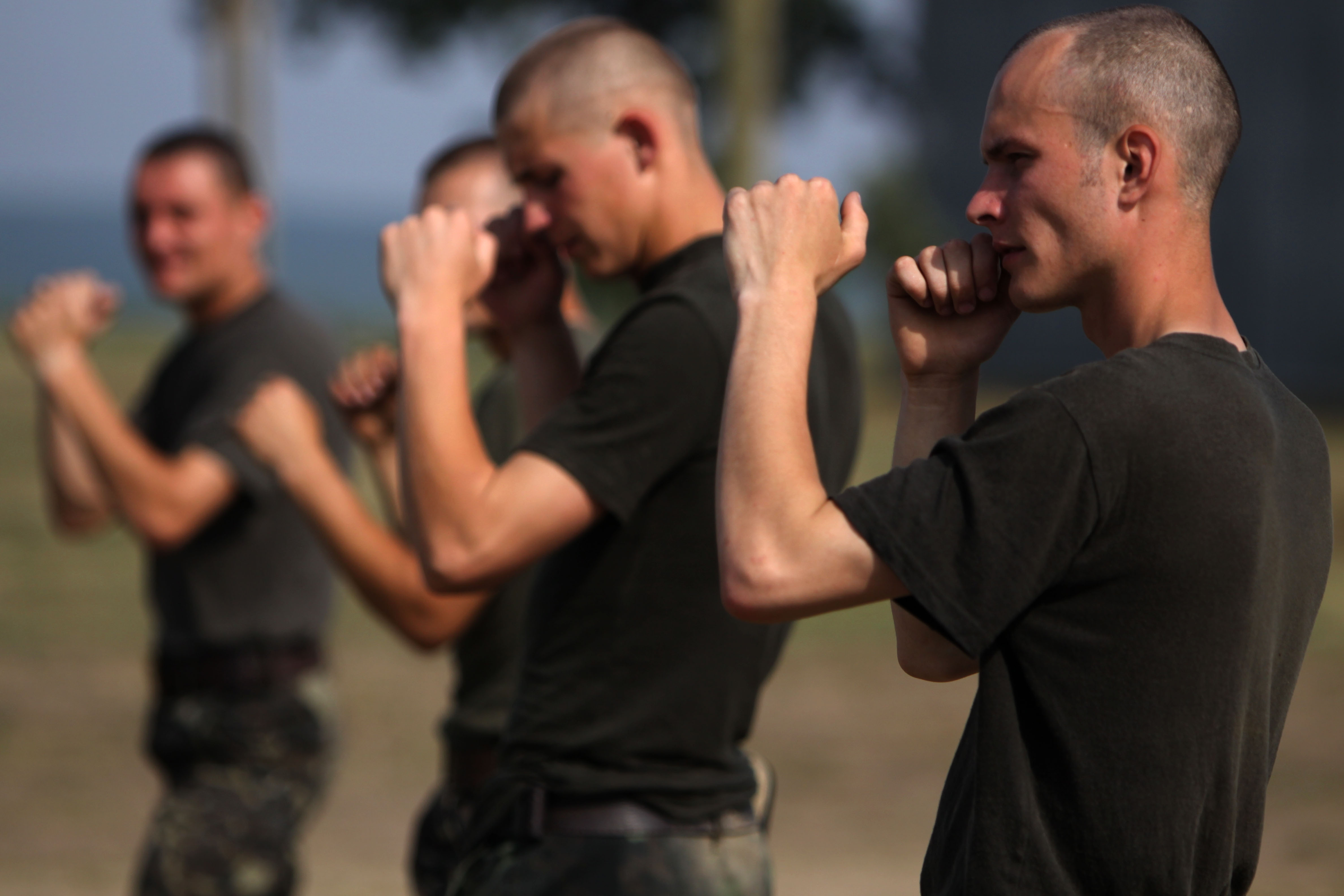
30th Mechanized Brigade during training

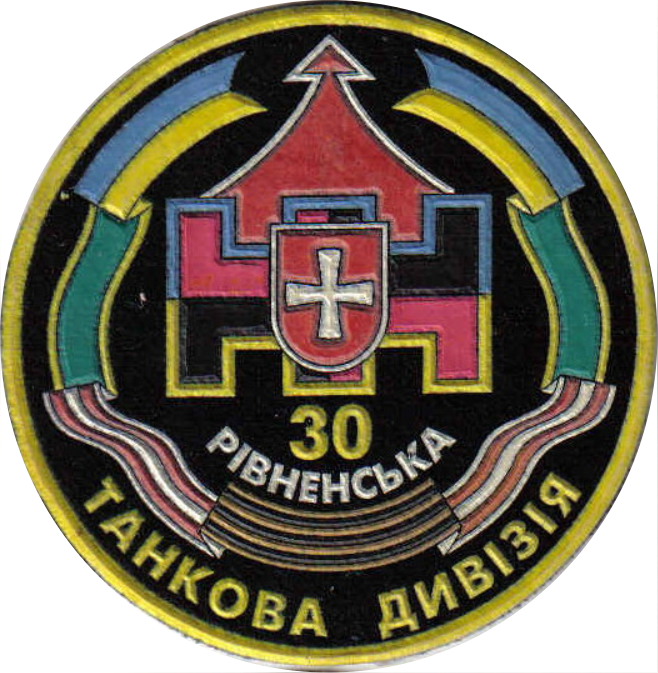
30th Tank Division

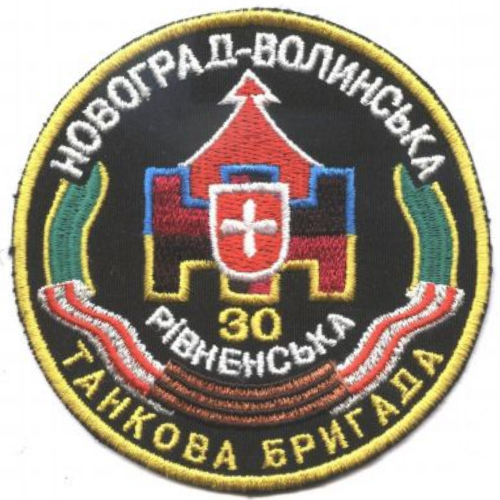
30th Tank Brigade

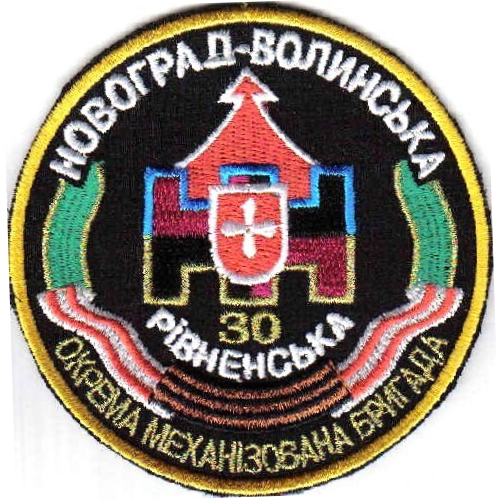
30th Mechanized Brigade

== Order of battle ==
In 1960, the division included the following units.

- 276th Tank Regiment
- 282nd Guards Tank Regiment
- 325th Tank Regiment
- 319th Guards Motor Rifle Regiment (Vysokaya Rech, Zhitomir Oblast)
- 855th Guards Artillery Regiment
- 937th Guards Anti-Aircraft Artillery Regiment
- 54th Guards Reconnaissance Battalion
- 151st Guards Sapper Battalion
- 214th Guards Communications Battalion
- 197th Chemical Defence Company (Vysokaya Rech, Zhitomir Oblast)
- 112th Medical-Sanitary Company
- Motor Transport Battalion

=== Division: 2003 ===
- 276th Armor Regiment
- 325th Armor Regiment
- 282nd Guards Armor Regiment
- 319th Mechanized Regiment
- 855th Guards Artillery Regiment
- 937th Anti-Aircraft Artillery Regiment
- 214th Guards Signal Battalion
- 54th Guards Reconnaissance Battalion
- 151st Guards Combat Engineer Battalion
- 108th Maintenance Battalion
- 1043rd Combat Service Support Battalion
- 112th Medical Battalion
- 404th Chemical Battalion

== Structure ==
As of 2024, the brigade's structure is as follows:

- 30th Mechanized Brigade, Zviahel
  - Headquarters & Headquarters Company
    - 1st Mechanized Battalion
    - 2nd Mechanized Battalion
    - 3rd Mechanized Battalion
    - Tank Battalion
    - Field Artillery Regiment
      - Headquarters & Target Acquisition Battery
      - Self-propelled Artillery Battalion (2S3 Akatsiya)
      - Self-propelled Artillery Battalion (2S1 Gvozdika)
      - Rocket Artillery Battalion (BM-21 Grad)
      - Anti-tank Artillery Battalion (MT-12 Rapira)
    - Anti-Aircraft Missile Artillery Battalion
    - Engineer Battalion
    - Maintenance Battalion
    - Logistic Battalion
    - Reconnaissance Company
    - Aerial Reconnaissance Unit "Commando Vyaloy"
    - Aerial Reconnaissance Unit "Aerobomber"
    - Attack Drone Company "Angry Peregrines"
    - Sniper Company
    - Electronic Warfare Company
    - Signal Company
    - Radar Company
    - Chemical, Biological, Radiological and Nuclear Defense Company
    - Medical Company

== Awards ==
The brigade has received 22 orders, and 30 of its soldiers have been decorated with medals.

- Order of the Red Banner - 276th, 325th, 282nd, 855th
- Order of Alexander Nevsky - 54th
- Order of Suvorov - Second Class - 325th, 282nd
- Order of Kutuzov - Second Class - 325th, 282nd, 855th
- Order of Bogdan Khmelnitsky - Second Class - 325th, 282nd
- Order of Kutuzov - Third Class - 54th
- Order of Bogdan Khmelnitsky - Third Class - 54th
- On 7 February 1944, awarded Rivne designation
- On October 20, 1999, awarded Novohrad-Volynskyi designation

== Past commanders ==
- Lieutenant General Selivanov September 5, 1941 –
- Major-General Petr Ivanovich Zubov
- Colonel Yuriy Muchailovich Mukolenko 2006–2007
- Colonel Ihor Dovhan 2007–?
- Colonel Oleksandr Nesterenko (2011)
