= 11th Army Corps (Ukraine) =

Ukrainian Ground Forces formation

- 11-й армійський корпус
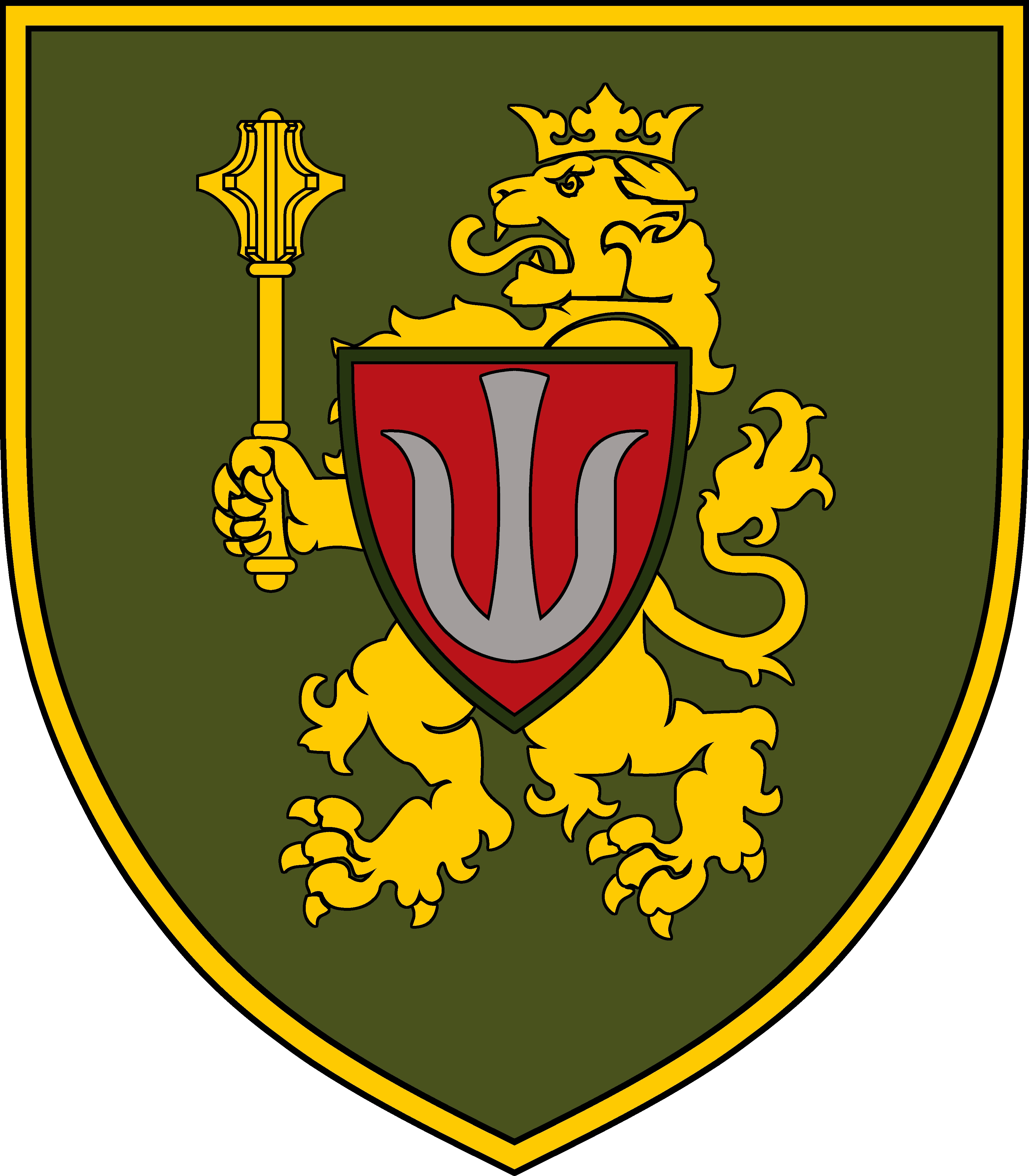
- Shoulder sleeve insignia
- Country: Ukraine
- Branch: Ukrainian Ground Forces
- Engagements: Russo-Ukrainian War
- Website: Official Facebook page

Commanders
- Current commander: Olesiy Maistrenko
- Spokesperson: Lieutenant Colonel Dmytro Zaporozhets

Insignia
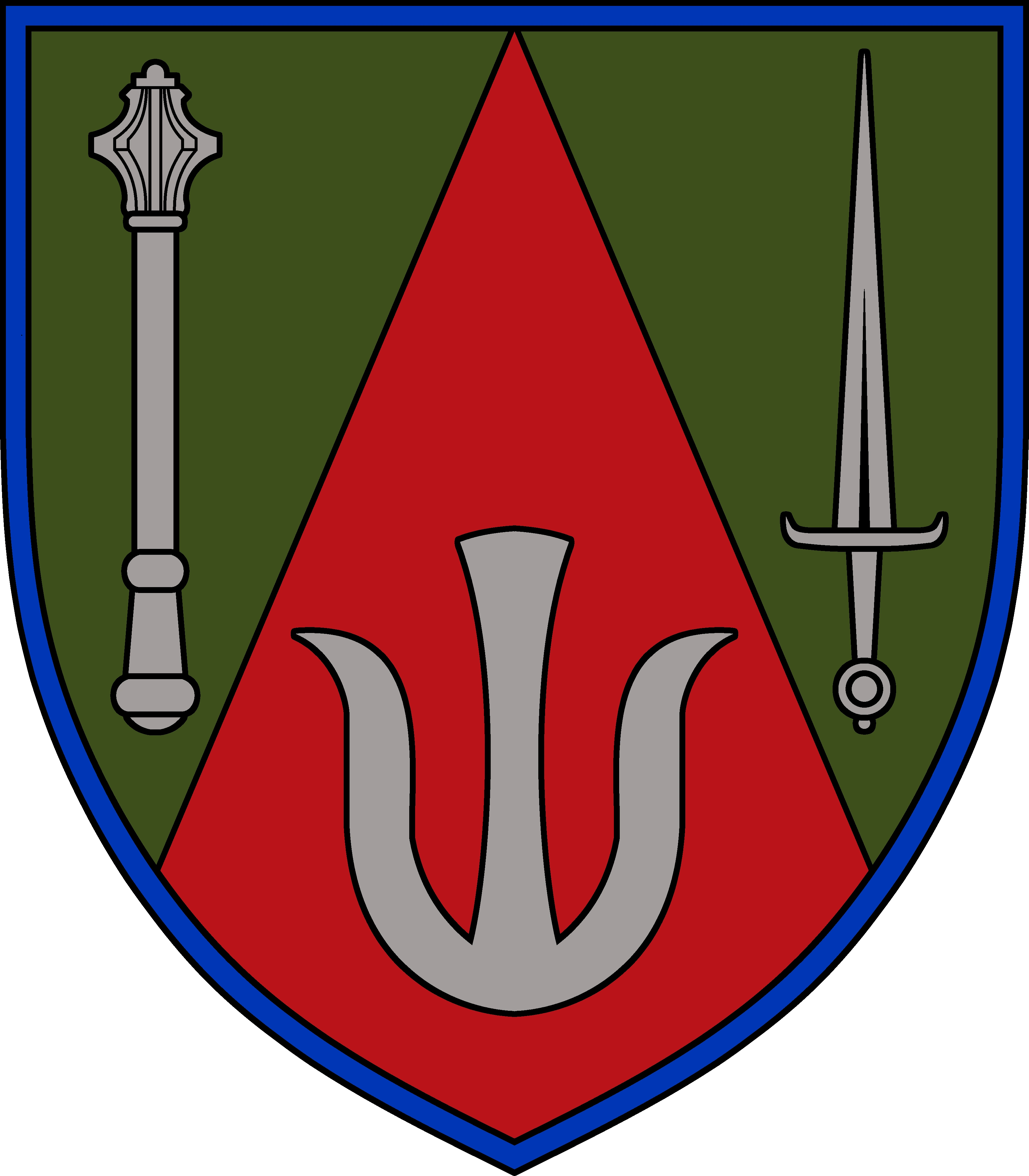
- Former insignia

The 11th Army Corps (Ukrainian: 11-й армійський корпус) is a Corps of the Ukrainian Ground Forces.

== History ==
The 11th Army Corps was established as part of the ongoing military reforms within the Armed Forces of Ukraine. According to available information, Ukraine formed the 9th and 10th army corps and restructured its Reserve Corps to the 11th Army Corps in 2023. This shift intends to modernize the army and bring it closer to NATO standards, as emphasized by President Volodymyr Zelenskyy when he approved the plan for this reorganization.

In July 2025, it was reported that Ukraine's Luhansk operational-tactical group had been reformed into the 11th Army Corps, including the 54th Mechanized Brigade and the 81st Airmobile Brigade operating near the city of Siversk in the Donetsk region. Later that month, it was reported that the corps included the 24th Mechanized Brigade, which was operating at Chasiv Yar.

Throughout August and September 2025, it was reported that the 11th Army Corps was involved in combat in the Siversk front near the Serebrianka forest and the village of Hryhorivka.

In September 2025, the Ukrainian military announced that the 11th Army Corps had repelled Russian incursions near Yampil in the Donetsk region.

On 27 December 2025, Ukrainska Pravda reported that the corps was removed from operational control of the Siversk front after failing to identify false reports provided by the command of the 54th and 10th brigades, which resulted in the loss of Siversk.

As a consequence of that, Brigadier General Serhiy Sirchenko was dismissed from his command on April 11th 2026. He was succeeded by Brigadier General Olesiy Maistrenko, former commander of the 169th Training Center.

== Structure ==
As of 2026 the corps is known to include the following brigades:

- XI Army Corps (ex-Army General Reserve)
  - Corps Headquarters
    - Management
    - Commandant Platoon
  - 24th Mechanized Brigade
  - 30th Mechanized Brigade
  - 45th Artillery Brigade
  - 54th Mechanized Brigade
  - 56th Motorized Brigade
  - 81st Airmobile Brigade
  - 93rd Anti-Tank Battalion
  - 94th Security and Maintenance Battalion
  - 127th Heavy Mechanized Brigade
  - 147th Command Reconnaissance Post
  - 152nd Reconnaissance Battalion
  - 173rd Reserve Battalion
  - 432nd Unmanned Systems Battalion
  - 510th Maintenance Battalion
  - 1221st Support Battalion

== Notable members ==
- Serhii Sobko, vice commander of the AFU (2026–)
