= Ukrainians in France =

- Logo of the Ukrainian Institute in France

Total population
- 24,700 (2017)

Languages
- French, Ukrainian, Russian

Religion
- Christianity (Ukrainian Orthodox, Catholic), Judaism

Related ethnic groups
- Ukrainian diaspora

Ukrainians in France are citizens of Ukraine who have migrated to France. According to INSEE, the Ukrainian population of France was 24,700 in 2017. By 2025, that number had grown to almost 90,000.

== History ==
=== Early Ukrainian presence in France ===
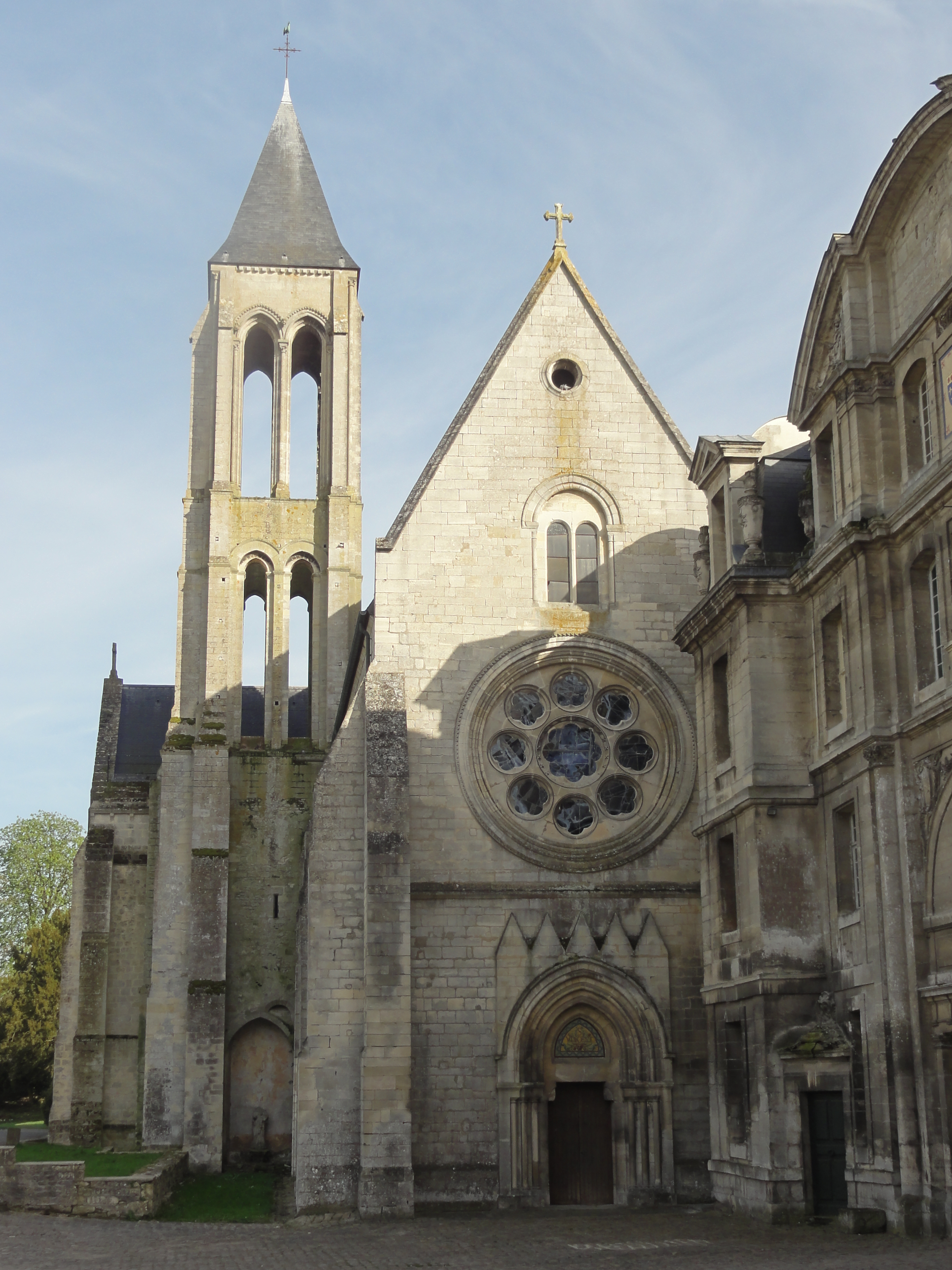
Abbey of St. Vincent, Senlis established by Anne of Kyiv

In 1051 king Henry I of France married Anna, the daughter of Kyivan prince Yaroslav the Wise. Following Henry's death in 1060, Anna became a regent of his son Philip I of France. Later in her life, Anne became a countess of Valois-Crepy and established a church and a monastery in Senlis. A representative from the modern-day territory of Ukraine took part in the First Council of Lyon, lobbying for a crusade against the Mongol Empire.

Students from Ruthenia and Ukraine are mentioned in documents of Sorbonne University starting from 1353. Among them was Ivan Uzhevych, who studied there in 1643-1645. Another Ukrainian native who studied in France was the 18th-century painter Anton Losenko. According to some sources, in 1646 a unit of around 2,400 Ukrainian Cossacks took part in the Siege of Dunkirk under command of Prince Condé. In the 18th century, Grégoire Orlyk, the son of Ukrainian hetman Pylyp Orlyk, entered French service and rose to the rank of general. The Orlyk family also supplied Voltaire with materials for his History of Charles XII.

During the Napoleonic Wars, numerous Cossacks from Ukraine participated in the occupation of France in 1813-1815. Under the influence of revolutionary ideas, many of them later joined the Decembrist movement in their homeland. In 1860-1867 Ukrainian writer Marko Vovchok resided in Paris, where she supported contacts with Gustave Flaubert, George Sand, Prosper Mérimée and other authors. Another Ukrainian native active in Paris during the late 19th century was painter Marie Bashkirtseff. In 1878 Ukrainian publicist Mykhailo Drahomanov participated in a literary congress in Paris, where he issued a protest against the Ems Ukaz. Ukrainian ethnographer Fedir Vovk and historian Mykhailo Hrushevsky also resided and worked in Paris for some time.

Following the end of World War I, a Ukrainian delegation took part in the Paris Peace Conference.

=== 20th century ===
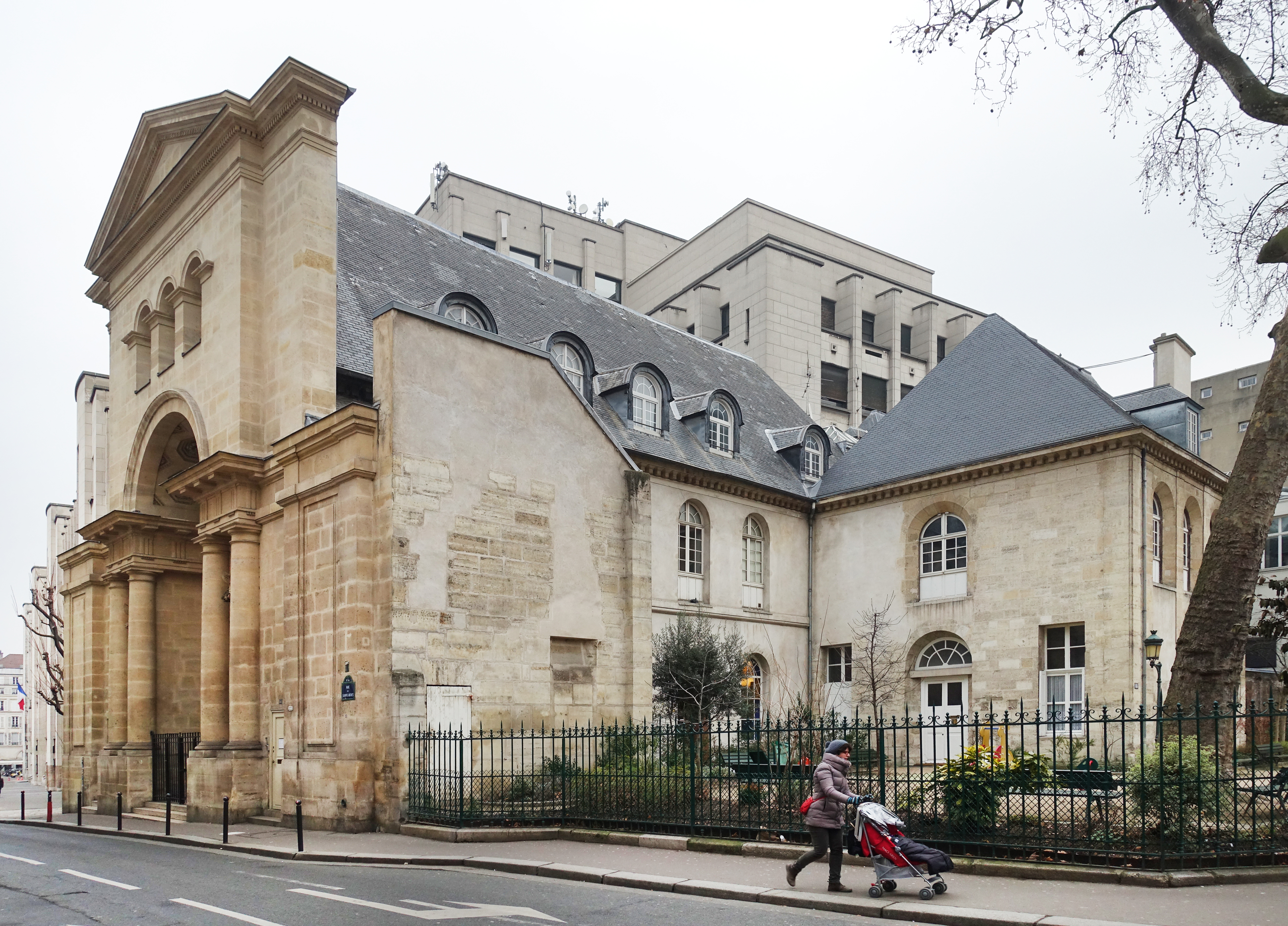
Cathedral of St. Volodymyr the Great in Paris

A significant number of Ukrainian emigrants came to France following the defeat of the Ukrainian People's Republic. During the 1920s and 1930s, members of the Ukrainian diaspora in Paris organized a network of Ukrainian schools, libraries, student societies, church choirs, publishing houses and political clubs. Ukrainian migrants during that period represented various groups and included, among others, former Ukrainian People's Army officers, migrants from Galicia, workers from Donbas, Podolia and other regions, as well as artists and students. Many Ukrainians in France were employed in mining or automobile industry. Most of them possessed Polish, Russian and Soviet documents and were forced to prove their Ukrainian heritage to authorities. During the 1920s, approximately 5,000 Ukrainians resided in France.

In 1927 France was visited by education minister Mykola Skrypnyk, who informed the local public about Ukrainization in Soviet Ukraine. During the Holodomor, Ukrainian diaspora in France played an important role in informing locals about the famine. Ukrainian diaspora also took part in organizing exhibitions, public lectures and concerts, translated books and engaged in public campaigning. In 1919-1921 France was toured by the Ukrainian Republic Capella headed by Alexander Koshetz.

During World War II, many Ukrainian prisoners of the Red Army were brought to France by Nazis as forced labourers. Some of them eventually joined the French Resistance, establishing several Ukrainian units in its ranks. Following the end of the war, they were demobilized on the insistence of the Soviet embassy. Some Ukrainian resistance members later joined the French Foreign Legion. During the first postwar years, around 4,000 Ukrainians arrived to France from displaced persons camps in Germany and Austria. Many of them later migrated to the United States and Canada.

In 1952 a chair of Ukrainian language was opened at the Institut national des langues et civilisations orientales in Paris. Since 1954 a Ukrainian delegation has been a member of UNESCO, whose main headquarters in located in Paris. During the postwar decades, Virsky and Veryovka ensembles delivered several performances in France. In 1978 the Committee for Ukrainian Folk Art was established in Paris. By 1980, up to 30,000 people of Ukrainian ancestry lived in France, with the biggest concentrations being found in Paris, Île-de-France and eastern regions. Two thirds of diaspora members belonged to the Ukrainian Greek Catholic Church, with most of the rest being Eastern Orthodox.

=== Modern era ===
Following the 2022 Russian invasion of Ukraine, Ukrainian refugees started to arrive in France. By 8 March, it was reported that almost 5,000 refugees had arrived in the country. On 10 March, the Interior Ministry reported that 7,251 people had arrived in France from Ukraine, 6,967 of whom were Ukrainian nationals. According to UNHCR, 69,670 Ukrainian refugees had been registered in France as of 31 December 2023. Around 75% of Ukrainians currently living in France are women. Paris and Île-de-France remain the main centre of Ukrainian community in the country.

== Notable people ==
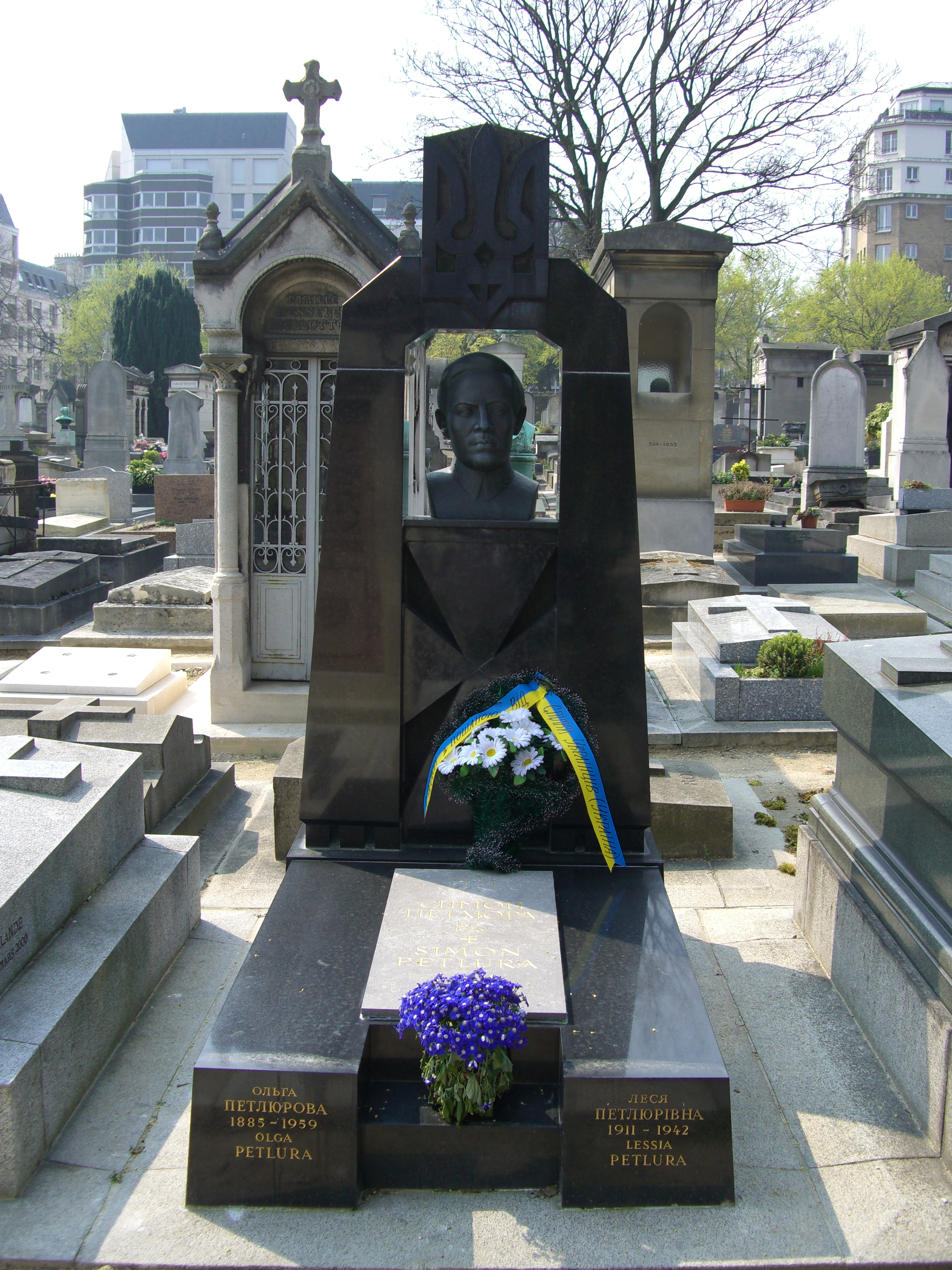
Grave of Symon, Olha and Lesia Petliura in Montparnasse Cemetery, Paris

- Grégoire Orlyk (1702–1759), military officer
- Polycarp Sikorsky (1875–1953), Eastern Orthodox religious leader
- Symon Petliura (1879–1926), politician and military commander
- Mykola Kapustiansky (1879–1969), military officer
- Volodymyr Vynnychenko (1880–1951), politician
- Viacheslav Prokopovych (1881–1942), politician and historian
- Mykhailo Boychuk (1882–1937), artist
- Mykola Shapoval (1886–1948), military officer
- Nestor Makhno (1888–1935), Anarchist leader
- Alexander Archipenko (1887–1964), artist
- Oleksandr Udovychenko (1887–1975), military officer
- Oleksander Shulhyn (1889–1960), diplomat
- Volodymyr Kubiyovych (1900–1985), historian, head of Shevchenko Scientific Society
- Mykola Hlushchenko (1901–1977), painter
- Sviatoslav Hordynskyi (1906–1993), poet
- Sofia Yablonska (1907–1971), writer and architect
- Pierre Bérégovoy (1925–1993), Prime Minister of France (1992-1993)
- Leonid Plyushch (1938–2015), mathematician and Soviet dissident
- Oksana Shachko (1987–2018) and Inna Shevchenko (born 1990), Feminist activists

== See also ==
- France–Ukraine relations
- Ukrainian diaspora
- Immigration to France
- Ukrainian Youth Association France, a scouting organization
