= 45th Artillery Brigade (Ukraine) =

- 45 окрема артилерійська бригада "імені генерала Мирона Тарнавського"
- Founded: 2016
- Country: Ukraine
- Allegiance: Ministry of Defence
- Branch: Ukrainian Ground Forces
- Type: Brigade
- Role: Rocket and Artillery Forces
- Part of: Operational Command East: 11th Army Corps
- Garrison/HQ: Yavoriv, Lviv Oblast
- Nickname: named after General Myron Tarnavskyi
- Patron: Myron Tarnavskyi
- Motto: Iron into steel - people into nation
- Engagements: Russo-Ukrainian War; Russian invasion of Ukraine
- Decorations: For Courage and Bravery

Commanders
- Current commander: Colonel Oleg Faidyuk

The 45th Artillery Brigade named after General Myron Tarnavskyi (MUN A2943) is an artillery brigade of Ukrainian Ground Forces, formed in 2016 as part of 11th Reserve Army Corps. The brigade was subsequently demobilized and only the skeletal crew remained. On 26 February 2022, the brigade was reactivated following the Russian invasion of Ukraine and was fully staffed by 28 February 2022. It has seen heavy combat during the Russo-Ukrainian war on multiple fronts. It is based in Yavoriv.

== History ==
On 12 May 2016, an order was issued for the creation of the 45th Artillery brigade as part of the 11th Reserve Army Corps and was established on 1 August 2016. In September 2019, during the exercises, the brigade conducted a mobilization of 1,500 personnel under the command of the commander Oleg Faydyuk.

=== Russo-Ukrainian War ===
On 24 February 2022, at the start of the Russian invasion of Ukraine, the 45th Brigade was maintained at the so-called staffed level of 52 servicemen. However, with the full-scale invasion, the brigade began combat deployment on 26 February 2022. It was fully staffed by 28 February 2022, now comprising over a thousand personnel of which 90% were civilian volunteers. The brigade also began to receive equipment and weapons. On 4 March 2022, the 87th Anti-Tank Division of the brigade took up the defense of Kyiv with the 57th and 62nd Howitzer Divisions joining the defense a few days later. On 10 March 2022, the brigade's 64th Howitzer Division arrived in Kryvyi Rih and took up its duties. On 11 March 2022, the brigade headquarters, support units, and the 59th Howitzer Division arrived in Zaporizhzhia receiving weapons and ammunition. The 411th Combined Rifle Battalion was also formed from the brigade's units and took up combat duties in the Donetsk Oblast. Detachments of the brigade also fought in the Dnipropetrovsk Oblast and Luhansk Oblast. On 20 May 2022, the brigade's 2S7 Pion destroyed "several" pieces of Russian equipment in Polohy at an oil plant after the brigade's personnel gathered intelligence using Spectator UAVs. On 23 May, its forces destroyed Russian mortar positions conducting seven strikes. On 22 June 2022, the brigade's artillery destroyed a Russian hangar containing armored vehicles. The brigade's detachments then participated in the 2022 Kharkiv counteroffensive and the 2022 Kherson counteroffensive. Its anti tank platoon operated near Barvinkove, Virnopillya and Brazhkivka in Kharkiv with its commander, Mishchenko Serhiy Alekseevich being called a "tank destroyer" having destroyed 35 pieces of Russian military equipment, including 7 units of equipment including four tanks in a single battle. On 4 August 2022, its forces stopped multiple Russian assaults in Kharkiv. On 10 August 2022, the brigade's 62nd division destroyed a Russian self-propelled gun, the next day the brigade's forces destroyed a Russian platoon stronghold along with three infantry fighting vehicles.

On 14 October 2022, the brigade's forces destroyed a Russian 2S19 Msta-S during the 2022 Kherson counteroffensive. On 6 November 2022, its anti-tank forces destroyed a Russian Tigr IFV using Stuhna-P ATGMs. On 16 November 2022, the brigade's artillery forces destroyed a Russian GAZ-66. On 22 November 2022, a soldier of the brigade (Pavlyuk Andriy Vasilyevich) died while performing a reconnaissance mission, being blown up by a mine. The anti-tank platoon commander, Mishchenko Serhiy Alekseevich was killed during an engagement in Kovalivka on 1 December 2022, and was posthumously awarded the Hero of Ukraine. On 6 December 2022, on the Day of the Armed Forces of Ukraine, the brigade received the battle flag. In December 2022, elements of the brigade were taking part in the Battle of Bakhmut. On 7 August 2023, the brigade's forces destroyed one Russian D-30 122 mm howitzer and two Russian 2S1 Gvozdika in a single series of coordinated strikes. On 30 August 2023, its forces destroyed a Russian Pantsir-S1. On 13 November 2023, an officer of the bridge (Syvenky Taras Bogdanovych) was killed in action. In January 2024, the brigade's forces were engaged in Donetsk Oblast. On 12 Match 2024, the Hromovyk attack drone unit of the 45th Brigade destroyed two tanks, two APCs, two mortars, two field ammunition depots, four dugouts and three troop concentrations of Russian forces. On 7 April 2024, it destroyed a Russian assault group attempting to conduct an offensive during the night. The group's IFVs struck landmines and were destroyed and the infantry was destroyed by the artillery strikes conducted by the brigade which also destroyed a Russian ammunition depot. In September the Brigade destroyed a Zoopark-1M Radar. On 1 October 2024, by decree of President Volodymyr Zelenskyy, the 45th Artillery Brigade was awarded the honorary title "named after General Myron Tarnavskyi". On 21 October 2024, its forces destroyed a Russian R-934B Sinitsa electronic warfare system.

On 12 December 2025 the unit was awarded the Presidential Award For Courage and Bravery by the President of Ukraine Volodymyr Zelenskyy.

== Equipment ==
Model	Image	Origin	Type	Number	Details
Artillery
152 mm gun-howitzer D-20		Soviet Union	152 mm gun-howitzer artillery		
152 mm howitzer 2A65 Msta-B		Soviet Union	152.4 mm howitzer artillery	5+	
2A36 Giatsint-B		Soviet Union	152mm Field gun		
MT-12 Rapira		Soviet Union	100-mm anti-tank gun		
2S7 Pion		Soviet Union	Self-propelled 203 mm cannon		
FH70		United Kingdom; West Germany; Italy	Towed 155 mm howitzer		
M777 howitzer		United States; United Kingdom	Towed 155 mm howitzer	2+	
FH77BW L52 Archer		Sweden	155 mm self-propelled howitzer	2+	
2S22 Bohdana		Ukraine	155 mm self-propelled howitzer		
Armored vehicles
BRDM-2		Soviet Union	Amphibious armoured reconnaissance vehicle		
ATGMs
Stuhna-P		Ukraine	ATGM		

== Structure ==
The structure of the brigade is as follows:

- Management and Headquarters
- 57th Howitzer Division
- 59th Howitzer Division
- 62nd Howitzer Division
- 64th Howitzer Division
- 87th Anti-Tank Division
- 411th Combined Rifle Battalion
- Artillery Reconnaissance Battalion
- Engineering Company
- Maintenance Company
- Logistic Company
- Signal Company
- Radar Company
- Medical Company
- CBRN Protection Company
- Commandant Platoon

== Commanders ==
- Colonel Tereshchuk O. M. (2016–2020)
- Colonel Oleg Faidyuk (2021-)

== Sources ==
- "Букет із крупного калібру: артилерія ЗСУ готова зіграти свою роль у звільненні Донбасу". narodna-pravda.ua. Народна правда. 2017-08-14. Archived from the original on 2017-08-14.
- На Львівщині створили добровольчу артилерійську бригаду
