= Serebrianka, Donetsk Oblast =

Serebrianka Серебрянка
- Village
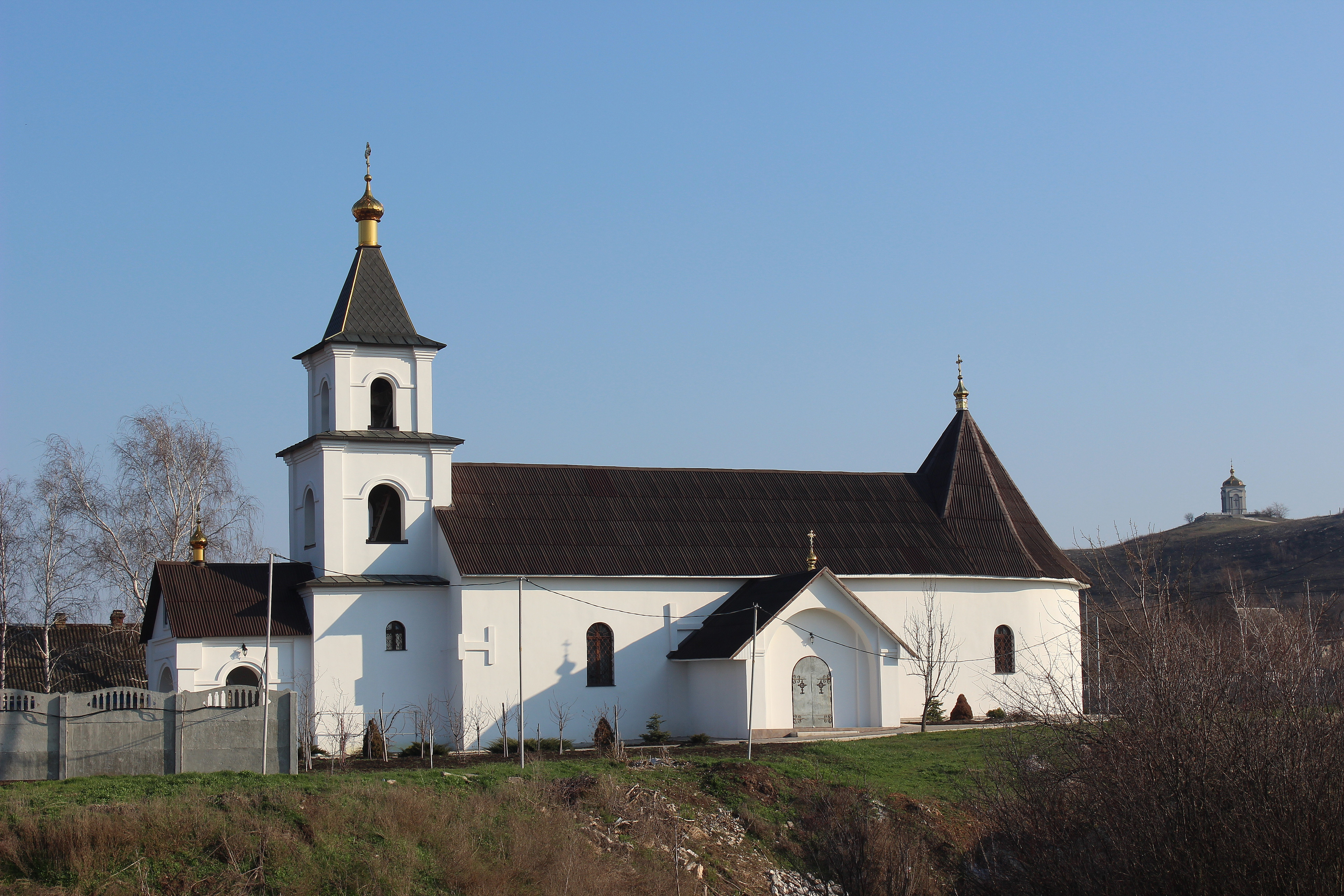
- Interactive map of Serebrianka
- Location of Serebrianka within Ukraine Serebrianka (Ukraine)
- Coordinates: 48.9175°N 38.134167°E
- Country: Ukraine
- Oblast: Donetsk Oblast
- Raion: Bakhmut Raion
- Hromada: Siversk urban hromada
- Founded: 1753

Area
  - Total: 4.24 km^{2} (1.64 sq mi)
- Elevation: 129 m (423 ft)

Population (22.02.2023)
  - Total: 50
  - Density: 12/km^{2} (31/sq mi)
- Time zone: UTC+2 (EET)
  - Summer (DST): UTC+3 (EEST)
- Postal code: 84520
- Area code: +380 6274

Serebrianka (Ukrainian: Серебрянка) or Sriblianka (Ukrainian: Сріблянка) is a village in Bakhmut Raion (district) in Donetsk Oblast of eastern Ukraine, at about 129 km NNE from the centre of Donetsk city, on the right bank of the Siverskyi Donets river, that separates the village from Luhansk Oblast. The village was founded in 1753 by Serb settlers of the Slavo-Serbia colony.

In May 2022, during the Russian invasion of Ukraine, attempts of Russian forces to cross the river near the village were repelled by Ukrainian military. On June 22, 2025, the first assault groups of the Russian Armed Forces entered Serebryanka, restarting the battle after almost 3 years of Ukrainian control secured in the village. According to Ukrainian sources, on July 27th, Ukrainian forces expelled the Russians from the village, but this came at a price: the Russians occupied the village of Hryhorivka. However, it was confirmed that even though the Russians lost territory in Serebryanka, they still held some houses east of the village. On August 15th, the Russians launched a major offensive that captured the village of Serebryanka.

== Demographics ==
According to the 2001 Ukrainian census, the village had a population of 1,100. The linguistic composition was:

Native languages in Serebrianka
	percent
Ukrainian	88.5%
Russian	11.0%
Hungarian	0.2%
Others	0.4%

== Notable people ==
- Mykola Shapoval (1886-1948), Ukrainian military officer of the Ukrainian People's Army
