= Sviato-Pokrovske =

Sviato-Pokrovske Свято-Покровське
- Village
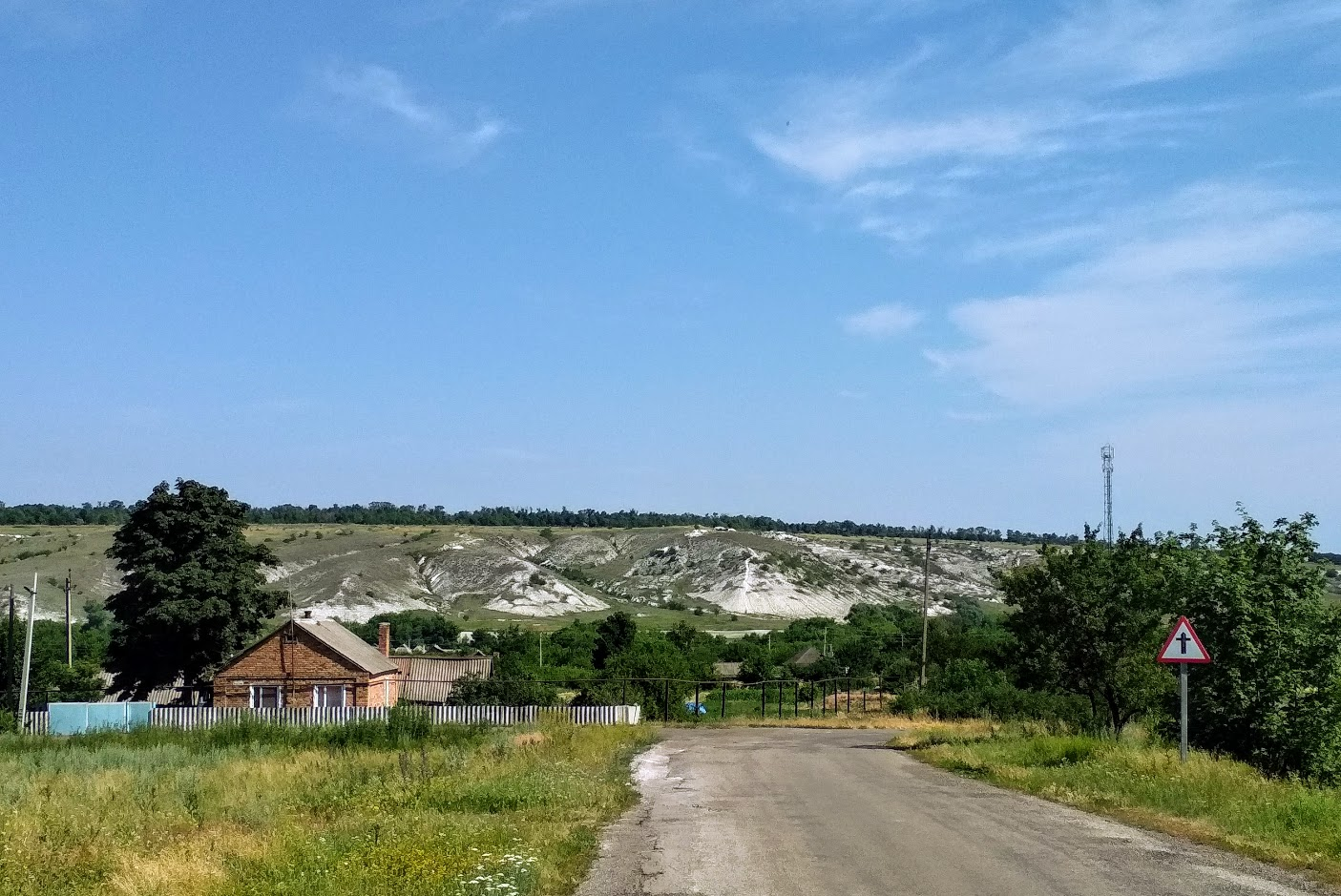
- View of Sviato-Pokrovske

- Location within Donetsk Oblast Location within Ukraine
- Coordinates: 48°49′47″N 38°3′23″E
- Country: Ukraine
- Oblast: Donetsk Oblast
- Raion: Bakhmut Raion
- Hromada: Siversk urban hromada
- Elevation: 78 m (256 ft)

Population
  - Total: 426
- Postal code: 84526
- Area code: +380-6274

Sviato-Pokrovske (Ukrainian: Свято-Покровське; until 2016 Kirovo, formerly Selimovka, formerly Shakhovka) is a village located in Bakhmut Raion of Donetsk Oblast, eastern Ukraine. Administratively, it is part of Siversk urban hromada, one of the hromadas of Ukraine. According to the 2001 census, the population was 542 inhabitants.

Near the village there is the local botanical reserve "Chalk Vegetation of the village of Kirovo".

== History ==
In the 19th century, the village was called "Shakhovka (Shakhovo)," then "Selimovka (Sulimovka, Selemovka"). The village was the volost center of the Selimovskaya volost, Izyumsky Uyezd, Kharkov Governorate. The village had the Church of the Intercession. Clergymen of the Church of the Intercession.

- 1840 — priest Avtonom Yakovlevich Polnitsky
- 1840 — deacon Maxim Nikolaevich Pivovarov
- 1840 — sexton Pavel Artemovich Popov
- 1896 — priest Petr Yushkov

The Shakhovs were the landowners until 1865, after which the village was sold to Count Stebok. During the Russian invasion of Ukraine, the population of the village fell as numerous families and all remaining children in the village fled or were evacuated.

== See also ==
- List of villages in Donetsk Oblast
