= Platonivka, Donetsk Oblast =

Platonivka Платонівка
- Village
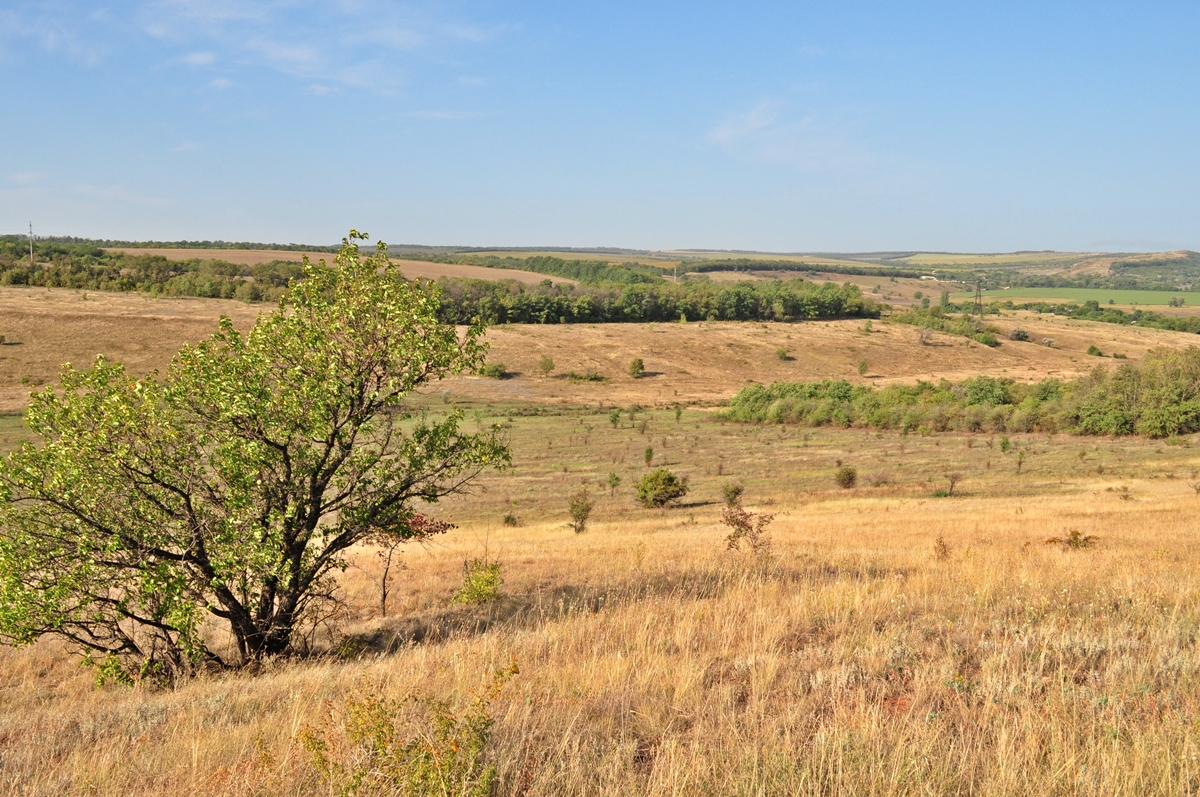
- Platovnika village, Ukraine

- Location within Donetsk Oblast Location within Ukraine
- Coordinates: 48°53′54″N 38°1′7″E
- Country: Ukraine
- Oblast: Donetsk Oblast
- Raion: Bakhmut Raion
- Hromada: Siversk urban hromada
- Elevation: 65 m (213 ft)

Population
  - Total: 33
- Postal code: 84521
- Area code: +380-6274

Platonivka (Ukrainian: Платонівка) is a village located in Bakhmut Raion of Donetsk Oblast, eastern Ukraine. Administratively, it is part of Siversk urban hromada, one of the hromadas of Ukraine.

== History ==
During the Russian invasion of Ukraine, the population of the village fell as numerous families and all remaining children in the village fled or were evacuated. On 17 November 2025, the village was captured by Russian forces.

== See also ==
- List of villages in Donetsk Oblast
