= Battle of the Siverskyi Donets =

Battle of the Russo-Ukrainian war

- Part of the battle of Donbas (2022) and the Russo-Ukrainian war
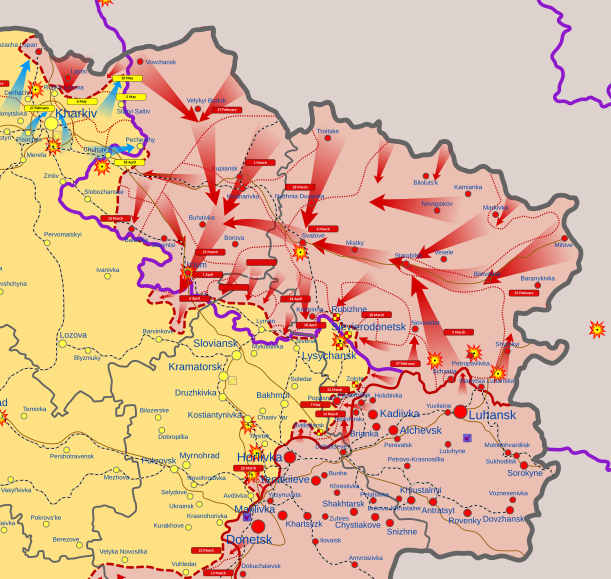
- The front line on May 13, with the Donets outlined in purple.
Date	5–13 May 2022 (8 days)
Location	Along the Donets river, in Dronivka, Serebrianka and Bilohorivka
Result	Ukrainian victory

Belligerents
Ukraine	Russia

Units involved
17th Tank Brigade; 30th Mechanized Brigade; 80th Separate Air Assault Brigade	74th Motorized Rifle Brigade

Strength
Unknown	Per NYT: 550 soldiers Per Ukraine: Two Battalion tactical groups (1,200-1,600 men)

Casualties and losses
Unknown	Per NYT & ISW: 485 casualties 80 vehicles destroyed Ukrainian claim: 1,000–1,500 killed 100 vehicles destroyed

A series of military engagements took place in May 2022, most notably from 5 to 13 May, near Lyman and Sievierodonetsk, on the eastern front of the Russo-Ukrainian war.

Russian forces from the 74th Separate Guards Motor Rifle Brigade of the 41st Combined Arms Army were defeated by tanks of the 30th Mechanized Brigade and artillery of the 17th Tank Brigade of the Ukrainian Armed Forces as the Russians attempted several crossings over the Donets river near the villages of Dronivka, Bilohorivka, and Serebrianka.

Ukrainian forces had previously managed to repel numerous attempted crossings of the river by Russian forces. The destruction of an entire battalion tactical group on 10 May, however, was described as "the deadliest engagement of the war" so far and was a "disaster" for the Russian army.

== Background ==
The Donets, the fourth-longest river in Ukraine and longest in eastern Ukraine, had long been considered to be a strategic line of defense for the Ukrainian army during the Russo-Ukrainian War. Being the longest river in the region, control of the Donets also meant an ability to freely maneuver military hardware north and south along the river's path, impact regional agriculture, and control the water supply to key cities such as Sievierodonetsk, Lysychansk, Kharkiv, and others.

During the battle of Donbas, Russian forces advanced forwards from the 2014 line of contact towards the city of Lyman, as part of a wider attempt to encircle a salient containing more than 40,000 Ukrainian soldiers. The Donets river was the largest natural obstacle standing in front of the Russian offensive. Russian attempts to cross the river in other locations, some of which were successful, involved the deployment of pontoon bridges to facilitate the transportation of troops and equipment across the river.

== Battle ==
During the early morning of 5 May, the Russian army, following artillery bombardment, tried to make a crossing of the river at Dronivka, but were stopped by Ukrainian troops and tanks. Two Ukrainian tanks of the 30th Mechanized Brigade engaged at least four Russian BMPs, two boats and two infantry squads at a distance of 1,200 metres (1,300 yards), stopping the advance.

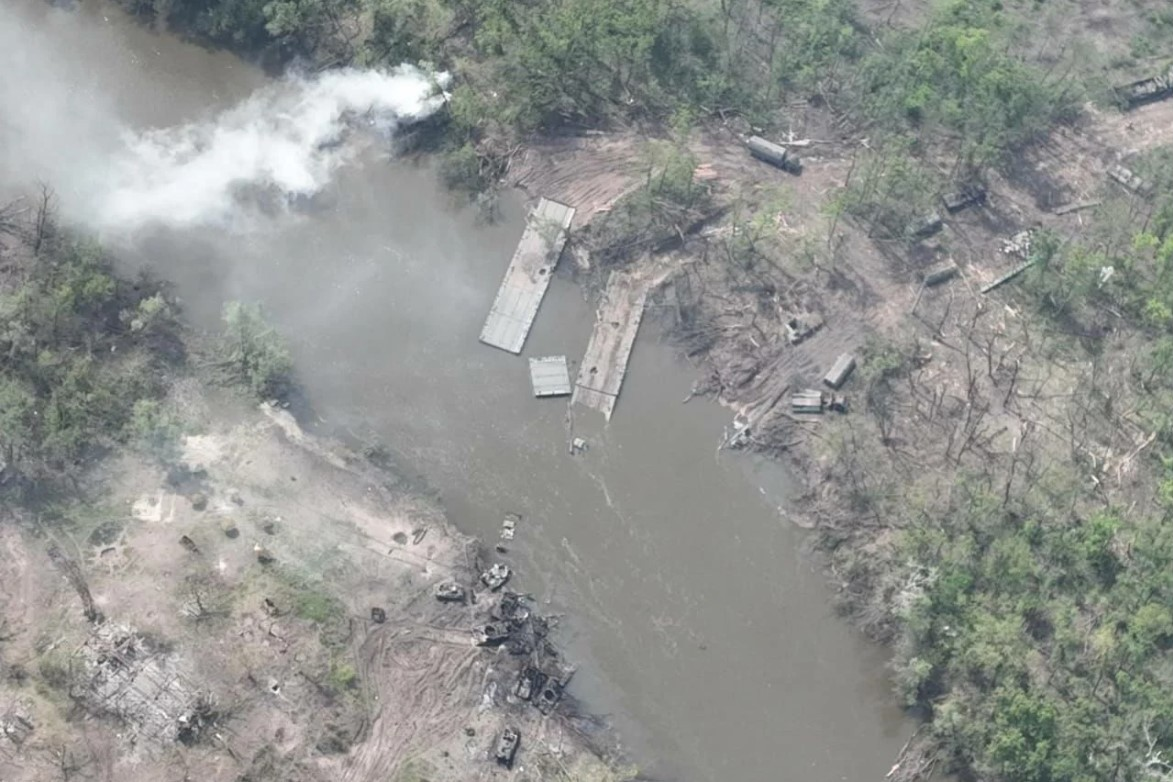
Destroyed Russian bridge and vehicles near Bilohorivka

On 8 May, Russian forces constructed a pontoon bridge across the Donets at Bilohorivka. Thousands of personnel, tanks, and other military vehicles prepared to cross over to the west bank of the river as part of their wider advance westward towards Lyman.

On the same day, the Ukrainian 17th Tank Brigade sent a reconnaissance detachment to the west bank of the river to observe Russian progress in the area. Russian troops had thrown smoke grenades in the area, creating difficulties in visibility. To counter this, the Ukrainian forces deployed drones, successfully spotting the pontoon bridge in the early morning. This information was relayed to the Ukrainian Air Force and artillery detachments stationed throughout the area, who pounded the bridge with a combined aerial and artillery bombardment. The bridge was confirmed to have been destroyed by 10 May. Ukrainian infantry claimed 30 vehicles destroyed with another 40 disabled by artillery fire for 70 total at this crossing. Ukrainian forces blew up four separate bridges at the Bilohorivka site alone.

The last bridge was constructed between Bilohorivka and Serebrianka around 12 May and was also destroyed, with the last Russian troops having retreated to their side of the river on 13 May.

== Casualties and losses ==
According to the Institute for the Study of War (ISW), out of the approximately 550 Russian soldiers who took part in the attempted crossing near Bilohorivka, 485 were killed or wounded, and more than 80 pieces of Russian equipment were destroyed. The Times estimated that over 1,000 soldiers were killed during the battle at the Donets, whereas Newsweek cited Ukrainian claims of up to 1,500 soldiers killed on 9–10 May during a Ukrainian counterattack and a heavy bombing raid by their aviation.

In total, four bridges were constructed and three bridgeheads were established: one at Dronivka, two at Bilohorivka, and another at Serebrianka. The whole battle lasted for eight days (5 May to 13 May), during which all bridges and all bridgeheads were destroyed by the Ukrainian army. In total, two Russian BTGs were reported to have been destroyed and routed.

According to Serhiy Haidai, the Governor of Luhansk Oblast, during the battle, Ukrainians destroyed Russian tanks, armoured vehicles, bridging equipment, helicopters and speed boats. Haidai claimed that Ukrainian forces destroyed two Russian BTGs, amounting to almost 1,000 soldiers.

Another source put Russian losses at at least six tanks, fourteen infantry BMP armored vehicles, seven amphibious MT-LB vehicles, five other armored vehicles and a tugboat. Calculations based on drone footage put Russian losses at 73 vehicles and equipment.

On 11 May 2022, the commander of the 12th Engineer Brigade, Colonel Denis Kozlov, was killed, the second commander of this brigade killed within two months of combat, and the 42nd Russian colonel lost during the open invasion phase of the war.

== Reactions and analysis ==
Due to the bloody and costly nature of the river crossing, the battle attracted significant media attention. The battle drew criticisms to the Russian Armed Forces from well-known pro-Russian milbloggers. One such blogger, Yuri Podolyaka, wrote online: "The last straw that overwhelmed my patience was the events around Bilohorivka, where due to stupidity — I emphasize, because of the stupidity of the Russian command — at least one battalion tactical group was burned, possibly two". Podolyaka further stated that the Russian Army lacked necessary weapons and equipment to fight and criticized Russian military leaders for repeating the same mistakes throughout the invasion. Another prominent blogger named Starshe Eddy called the actions of the commanders "not idiocy, but direct sabotage". A third blogger named Vladlen Tatarski was also very critical towards the Russian commanders and their tactics, writing: "Until we get the last name of the military genius who laid down a B.T.G. by the river and he answers for it publicly, we won’t have had any military reforms". The ISW stated that these direct criticisms from pro-Russian bloggers could be significant in that it may fuel doubts of the Russian people's faith in their military leaders and of the war.

Military analysts were reportedly stunned by the lack of tactical sense in the attempted river crossing. These analysts speculate that the Russian commanders may have rushed the operation in a desperate attempt to make any sort of military progress. They also suggested the battle showcased the disorder within the Russian ranks.

== Aftermath ==
The losses suffered from the battle bogged down the Russian advance in Luhansk Oblast and delayed their advance into northern Donetsk Oblast.

It was not until around 28–30 June, after the fall of Sievierodonetsk and during the encirclement of Lysychansk, that Russian forces made a notable river crossing of the Donets, with Chechen Kadyrovites and LPR separatist units capturing the town of Pryvillia after a river crossing. An intelligence report by the UK defence ministry said the encirclement of Lysychansk from the south (the Popasna direction) removed the need for a major river crossing by the Russians in the sector.

Later, Bilohorivka was captured by Russia after the fall of Lysychansk, but Ukraine launched a counterattack aimed on retaking it on 17 July. The counterattack was denied by Russia, and was seen as likely to fail. However, Bilohorivka was retaken by Ukraine on September 19.

== See also ==
- Outline of the Russo-Ukrainian War
- Battle of Donbas (2022)
