= France–Ukraine relations =

- France: Ukraine

Diplomatic mission
- Embassy of France, Kyiv: Embassy of Ukraine, Paris

Diplomatic relations between France and Ukraine were established in 1992. Since 2006, Ukraine is an observer in the Francophonie. France is a member of the European Union, which Ukraine applied for in 2022. Both countries are full members of Council of Europe.

== History ==
During the 2026 France wildfires, Ukraine sent an team of firefighters from the State Emergency Service consisting of 70 rescuers and 15 specialized vehicles. They were in France for almost two weeks and covered dozens of deployments and surveyed hundreds of hectares of land while sharing their knowledge from the war in Ukraine. Their mission was highly praised by both local French authorities and local citizens.

== Russian invasion of Ukraine ==
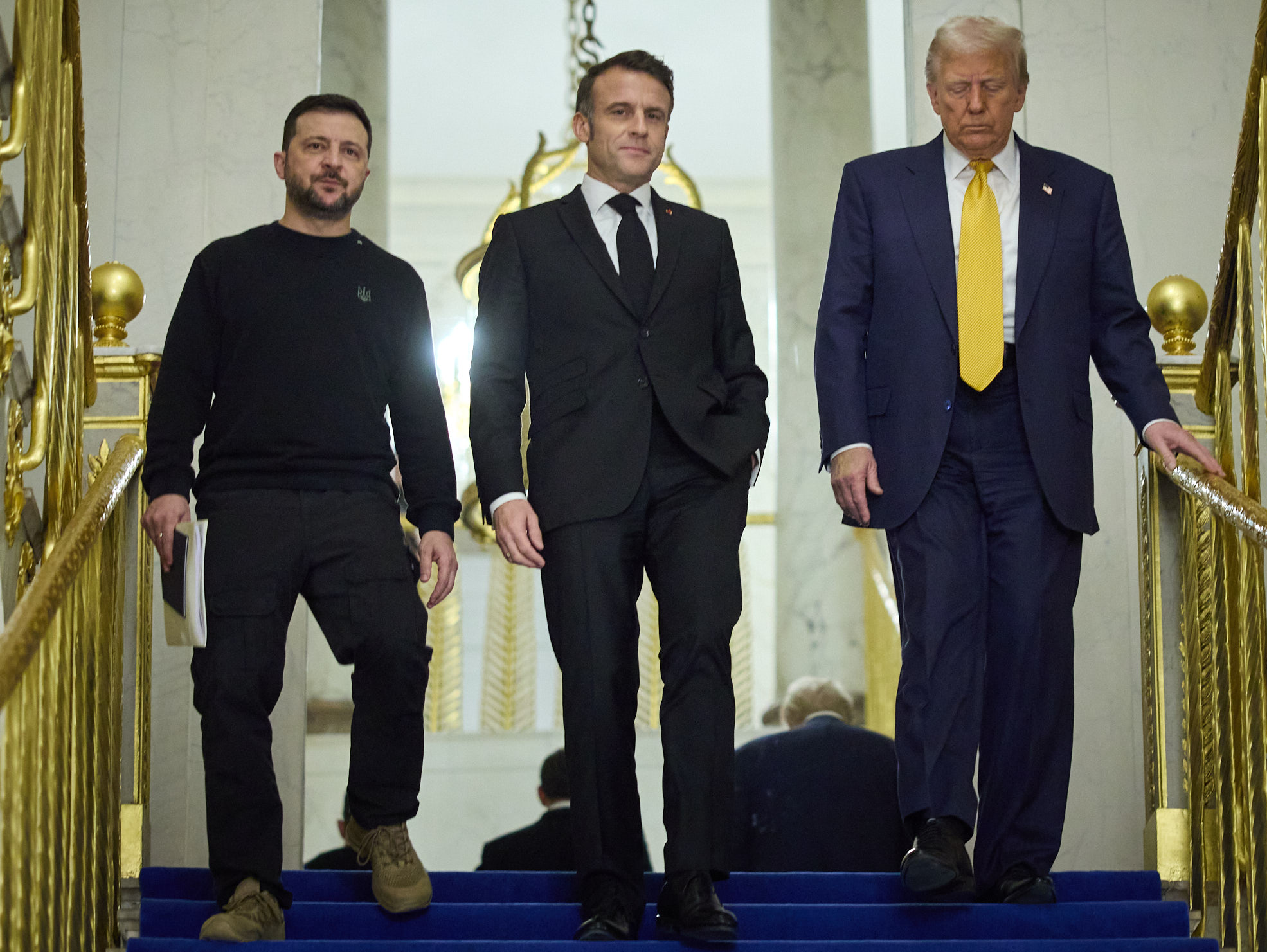
Ukrainian President Volodymyr Zelenskyy, French President Emmanuel Macron and U.S. President-elect Donald Trump in Paris on 7 December 2024

On 16 June 2022, French President Emmanuel Macron visited Ukraine alongside German Chancellor Olaf Scholz and Italy's Prime Minister Mario Draghi. He met with Ukraine's President Volodymyr Zelenskyy and expressed "European Unity" for Ukraine. He said that the nations that remained neutral in the Russo-Ukrainian War made a historic mistake and were complicit in the new imperialism.

In February 2024, during a meeting with other European states, Macron generated controversy by suggesting sending ground troops to Ukraine. On 28 May 2024, Macron gave Ukraine permission to use SCALP EG missiles against targets on Russian soil. Such usage was instructed to be limited "to neutralize military sites from which missiles are being fired, military sites from which Ukraine is being attacked".

In October 2024, France supported President Zelenskyy's Victory Plan for Ukraine.

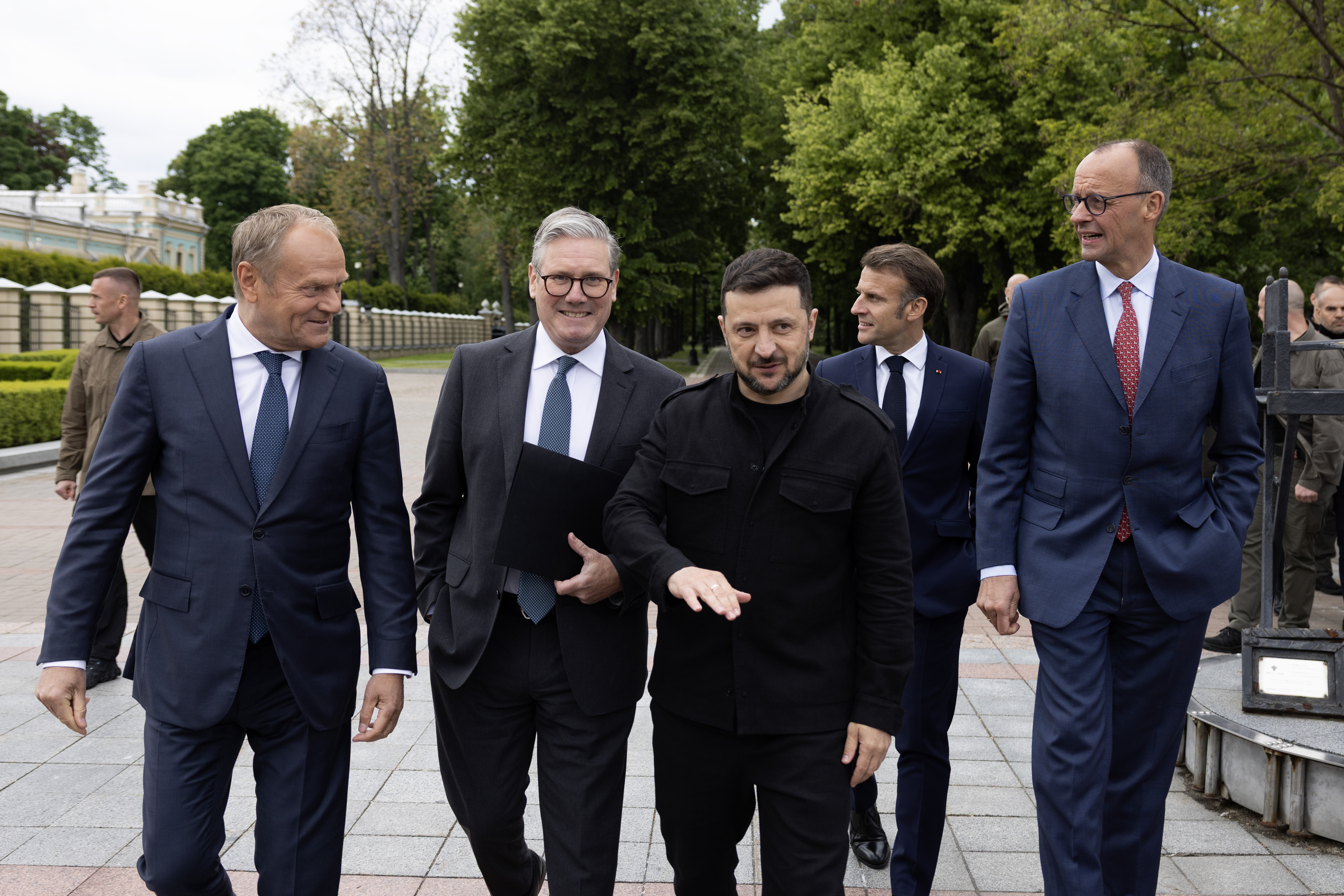
German Chancellor Friedrich Merz、French President Emmanuel Macron、British Prime Minister Keir Starmer and Poland Prime Minister Donald Tusk with Ukrainian President Volodymyr Zelenskyy in Ukraine in May 2025

On 24 February 2025, during a meeting with US President Donald Trump, Macron said that a truce between Ukraine and Russia could be agreed in the coming weeks.

== State visits ==
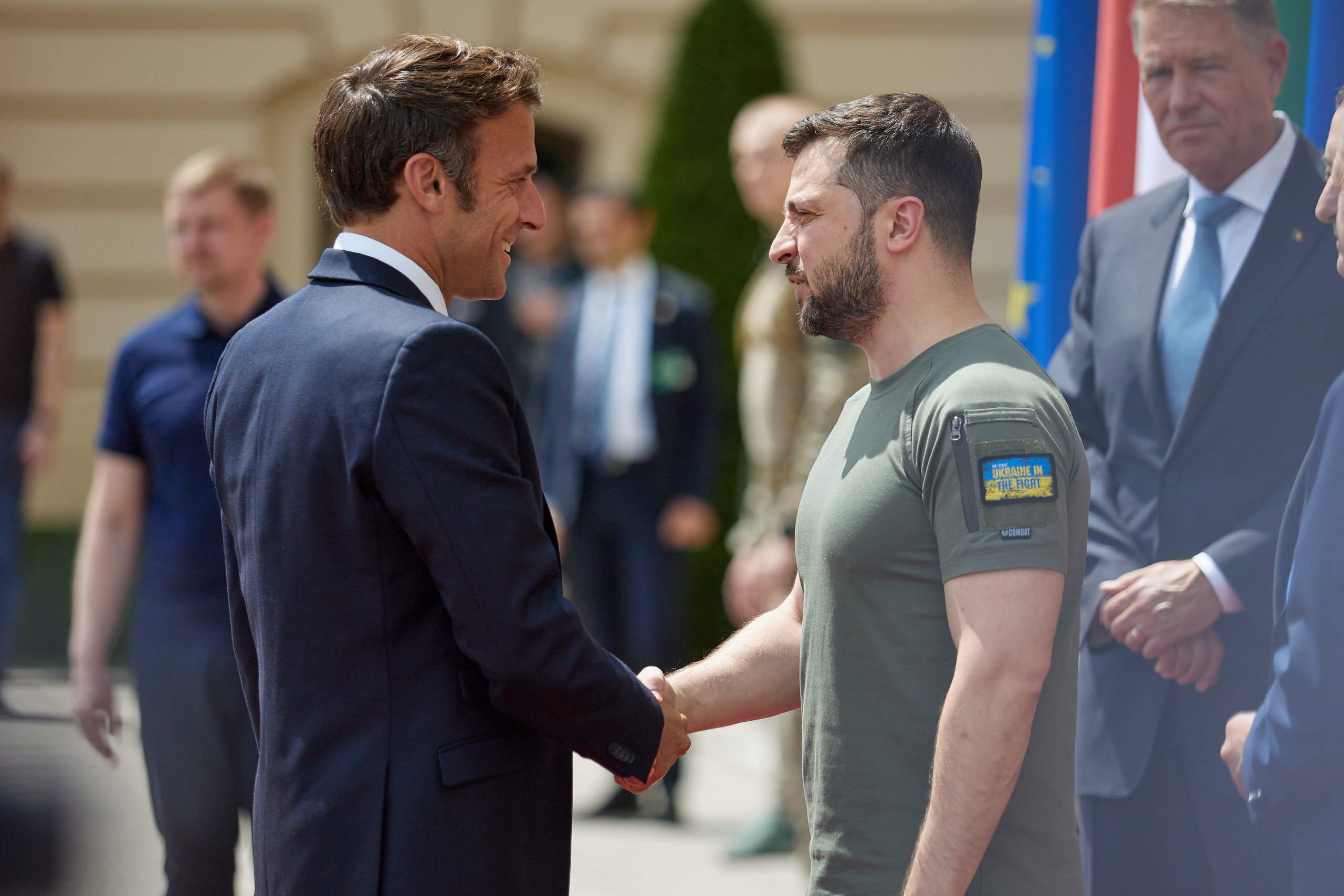
French President Emmanuel Macron meets with Ukrainian President Volodymyr Zelenskyy in Kyiv, 16 June 2022

French President Jacques Chirac made a state visit to Ukraine in September 1998.

Ukrainian President Petro Poroshenko paid a state visit to France on 26 June 2017, when he met with French President Emmanuel Macron. Poroshenko also visited Senlis to meet the Ukrainian community of France and honor memory of Anne of Kiev — Queen of France.

The French Minister of State, Jean-Baptiste Lemoyne, visited Kiev on 30 October 2018 for the seventh Franco-Ukrainian Mixed Economic Commission. President Macron and the German Chancellor met with the Ukrainian Head of State on the sidelines of the Paris Peace Forum on 11 November 2018.

== Economic cooperation ==
In the first six months of 2017 the trade between the countries grew by 15.2%.

== Defense deals ==
On 6 June 2025, French Defence Minister Sébastien Lecornu announced that French automotive and defense companies would begin producing drones on Ukrainian territory. He stated that, in addition to supplying Ukraine, the drones would also be used by French armed forces for ongoing tactical and operational training aligned with real-world conditions.

== Resident diplomatic missions ==
- France has an embassy in Kyiv.
- Ukraine has an embassy in Paris.
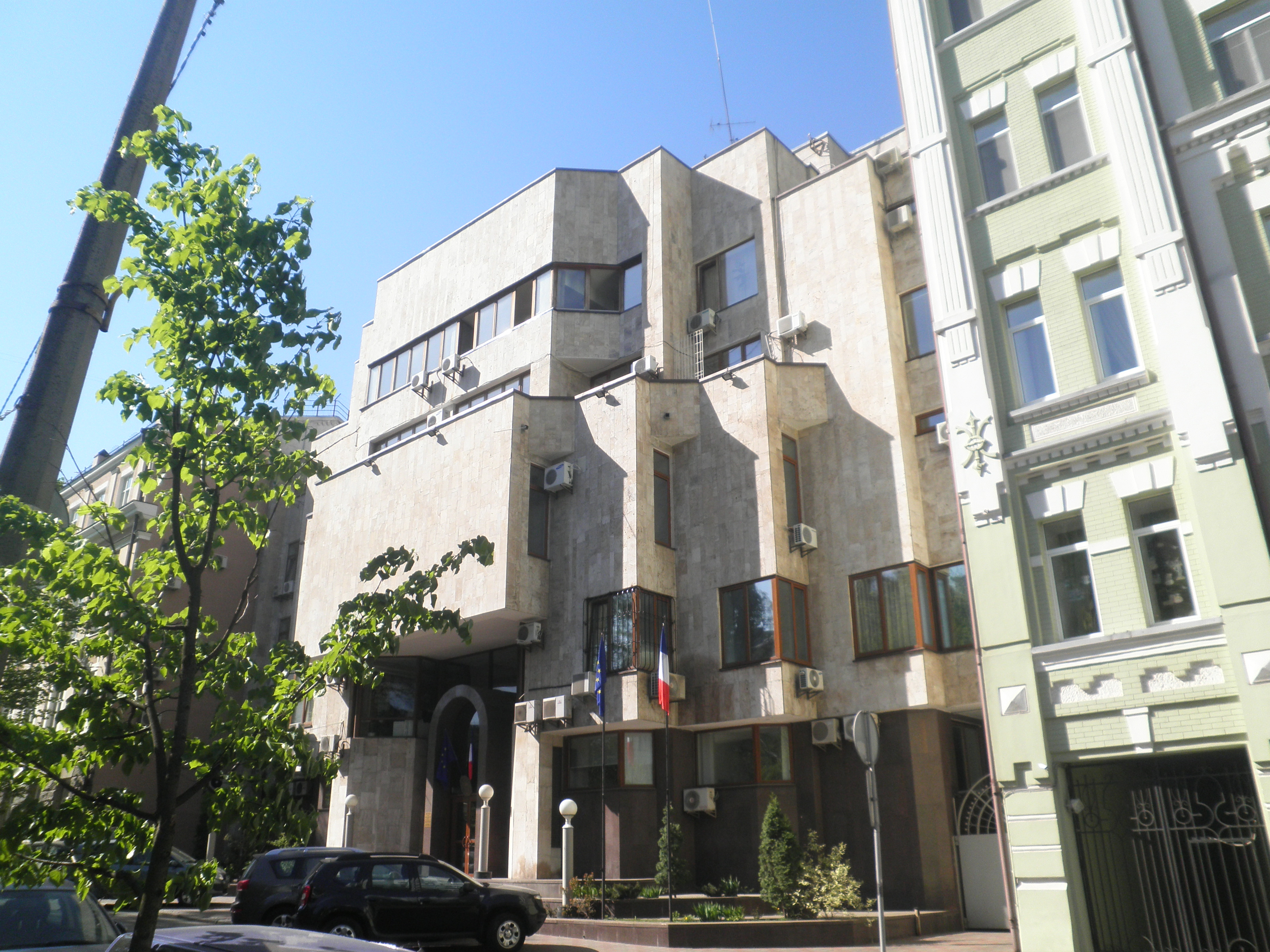
Embassy of France in Kyiv

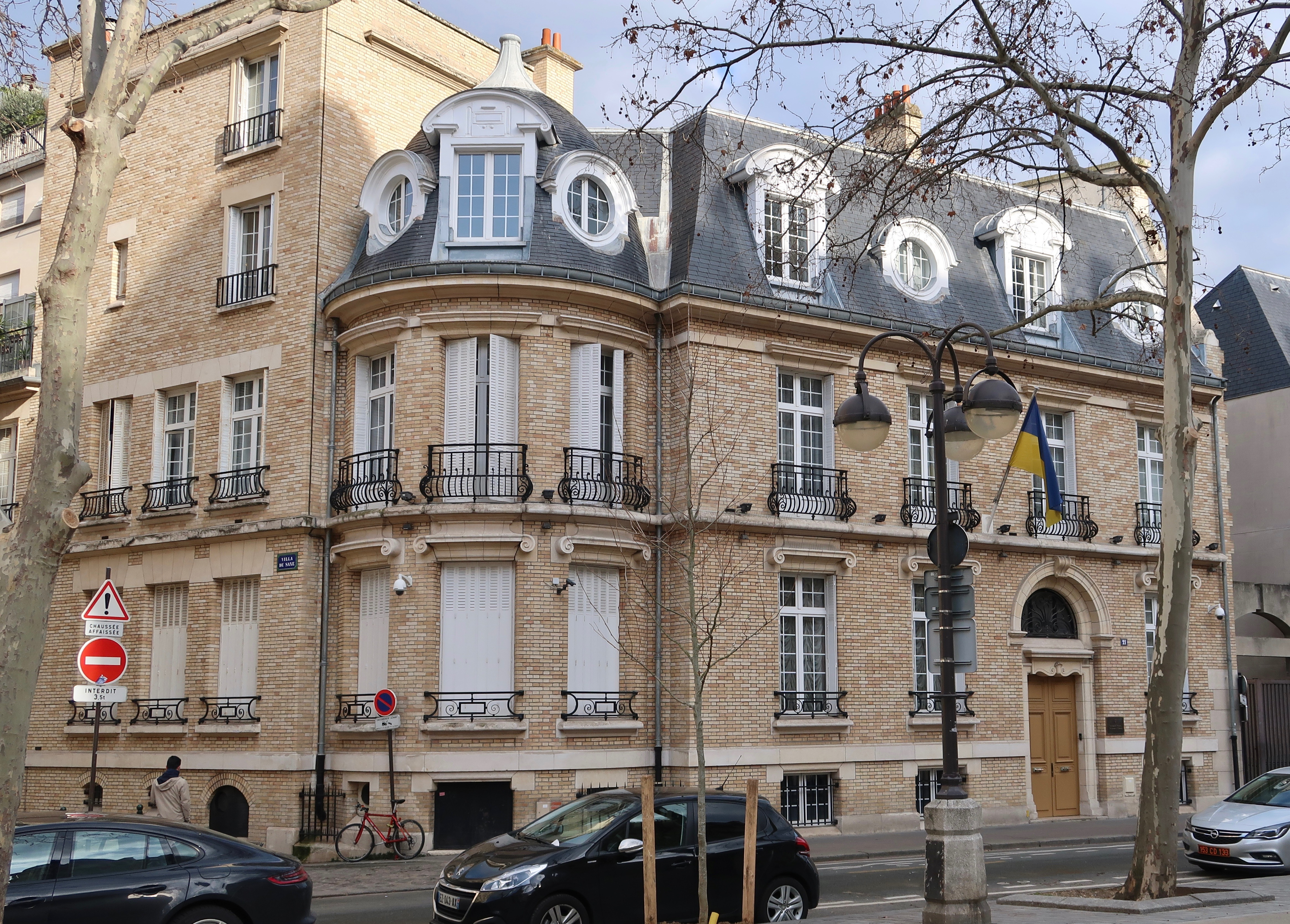
Embassy of Ukraine in Paris

== See also ==
- Ukrainians in France
- Ukraine–European Union relations
