= Riznykivka =

Riznykivka Різниківка
- Village
- Location within Donetsk Oblast Location within Ukraine
- Coordinates: 48°50′8″N 38°1′3″E
- Country: Ukraine
- Oblast: Donetsk Oblast
- Raion: Bakhmut Raion
- Hromada: Siversk urban hromada
- Elevation: 80 m (260 ft)

Population
  - Total: 457
- Postal code: 84526
- Area code: +380-6274

Riznykivka (Ukrainian: Різниківка) is a village located in Bakhmut Raion of Donetsk Oblast, eastern Ukraine. Administratively, it is part of Siversk urban hromada, one of the hromadas of Ukraine.

== History ==
The village was founded in the first half of the 17th century. Its first settlers were registered Cossacks from the village of Zakitnoye. In 19th century, Riznykivka was a state hut of Selymivska volost, Izyumsky Uyezd, Kharkov Governorate. As of 1869, the village had 50 households and 308 inhabitants.

Since 1954 it has been the center of the Riznykovka Village Council Yama Raion. The villages of Kirove and Novooleksandrivka were also subordinate to the village council.

During the Russian invasion of Ukraine, the population of the village fell as numerous families and all remaining children in the village fled or were evacuated.

== See also ==
- List of villages in Donetsk Oblast
