= 152nd Reconnaissance Strike Battalion (Ukraine) =

- 152-й Окремий розвідувально-ударний батальйон
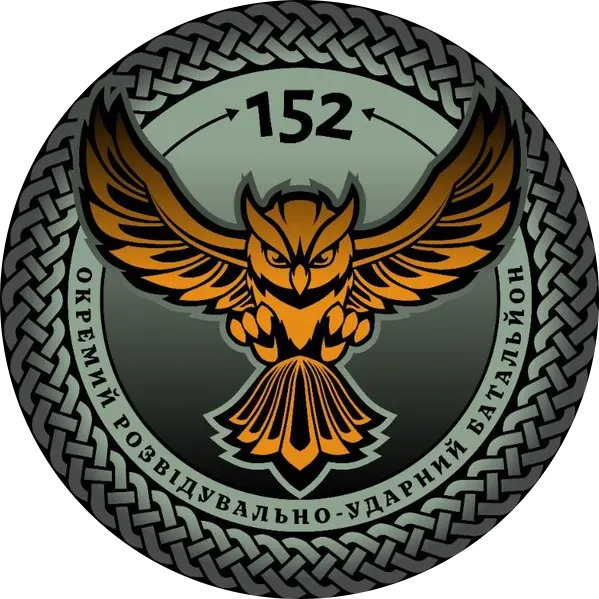
- Battalion's insignia
- Founded: 2023
- Country: Ukraine
- Allegiance: Armed Forces of Ukraine
- Branch: Ukrainian Ground Forces
- Type: Battalion, spetsnaz
- Role: Reconnaissance, counteroffensive and sabotage
- Engagements: Russo-Ukrainian War; 2022 Russian invasion of Ukraine

Insignia
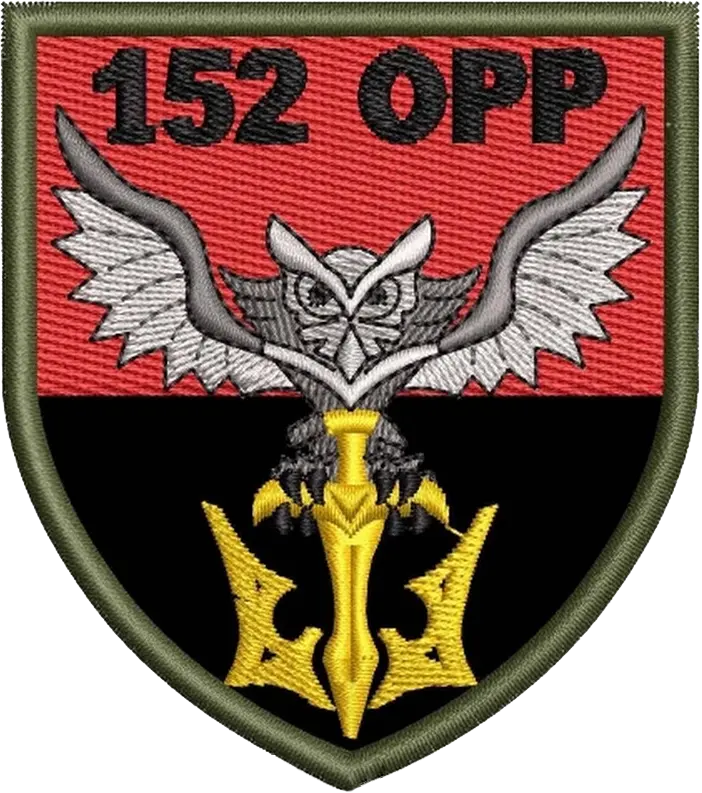
- Former Insignia

The 152nd Separate Reconnaissance Strike Battalion (MUN A4726) is a battalion of the Ukrainian ground forces acting as an independent unit, subordinated to the 11th Army Corps. It has seen combat during the Russo-Ukrainian war, initially as a Company and has been performing reconnaissance, drone strikes and other combat operations throughout the entire front. It was established in 2023.

== History ==
On 9 May 2023, a soldier of the Company (Hyluk Serhi Ivanovych) was killed during the Battle of Bakhmut. On 17 June 2023, a soldier of the Company (Muran Roman Yaroslavovych) was killed in Bakhmut.

On 24 October 2024, a soldier of the battalion (Raboshlyk Oleksandr Volodymyrovych) was killed during the Battle of Toretsk.
