= Siversk urban hromada =

Siversk urban hromada Сіверська міська громада
- Hromada
- Interactive map of Siversk urban hromada
- Country: Ukraine
- Oblast: Donetsk
- Raion: Bakhmut

Area
  - Total: 195.4 km^{2} (75.4 sq mi)

Population (2020)
  - Total: 13,244
  - Density: 67.78/km^{2} (175.5/sq mi)
- Settlements: 7
- Cities: 1
- Villages: 6

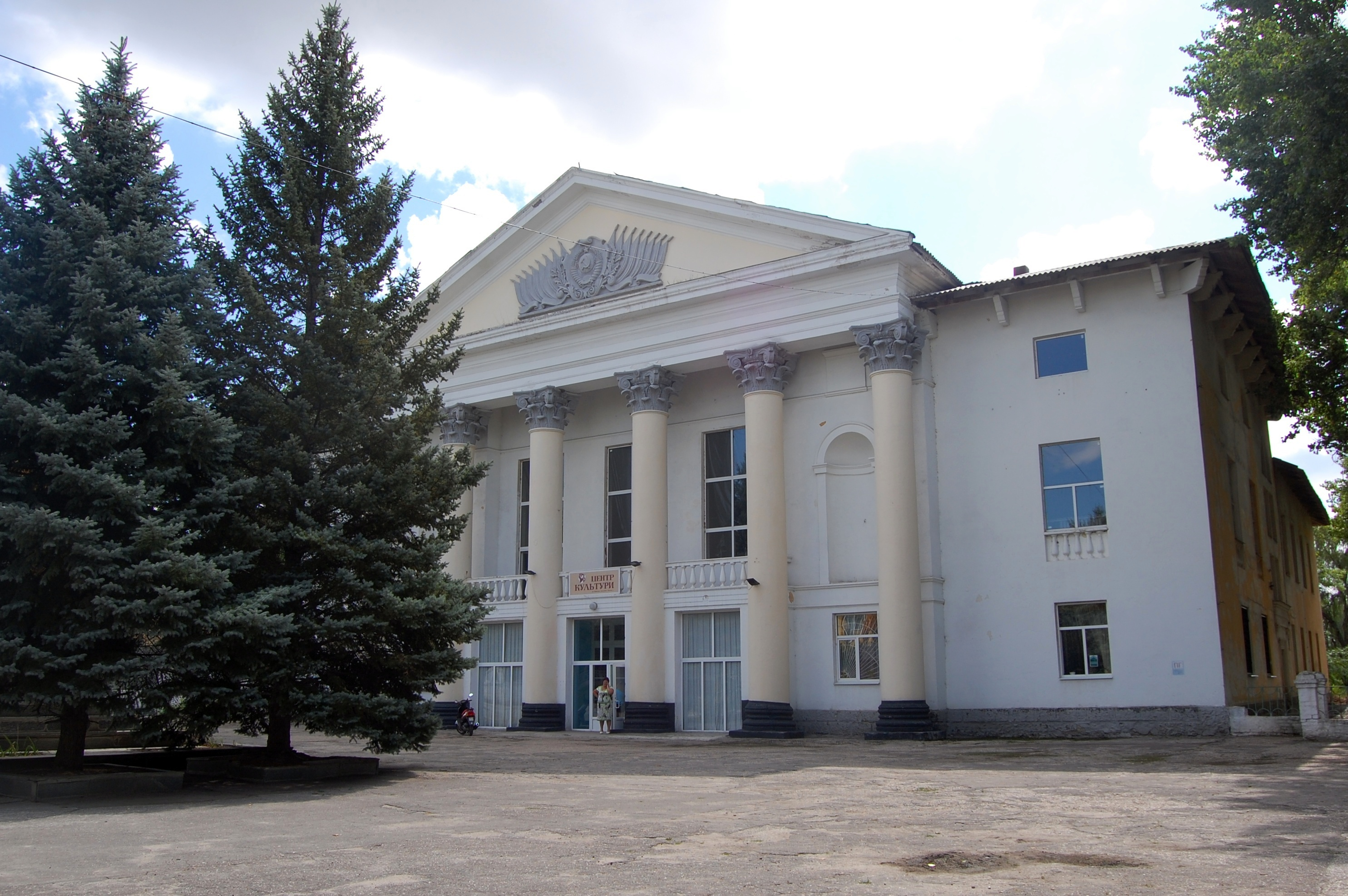
Siversk, Donetsk region

Siversk urban hromada (Ukrainian: Сіверська міська громада) is a hromada of Ukraine, located in Bakhmut Raion, Donetsk Oblast. Its administrative center is the city Siversk.

It has an area of 195.4 square kilometres (75.4 mi^{2}) and a population of 13,244, as of 2020.

The hromada contains 7 settlements: the city Siversk and 6 villages:

- Hryhorivka
- Dronivka
- Platonivka
- Riznykivka
- Sviato-Pokrovske
- Serebrianka

== See also ==
- List of hromadas of Ukraine
