= Hryhorivka, Siversk urban hromada, Bakhmut Raion, Donetsk Oblast =

Hryhorivka Григорівка
- Village
- Location within Donetsk Oblast Location within Ukraine
- Coordinates: 48°55′28″N 38°11′16″E
- Country: Ukraine (de jure) Russia (de facto)
- Oblast: Donetsk Oblast
- Raion: Bakhmut Raion
- Hromada: Siversk urban hromada
- Elevation: 79 m (259 ft)

Population
  - Total: 0
- Postal code: 84520
- Area code: +380-6274

Hryhorivka (Ukrainian: Григорівка) is a village located in Bakhmut Raion of Donetsk Oblast, eastern Ukraine. Administratively, it is part of Siversk urban hromada, one of the hromadas of Ukraine.

== History ==
By the beginning of May 2022, during the Russian invasion of Ukraine, all residents within the village had left. On 6 February 2024, Russian attacks against Ukrainian defenses north of the village were reportedly repelled.

On June 21, 2025, during the Battle of Siversk, the village of Hryhorivka was completely controlled by Russian forces.

== See also ==
- List of villages in Donetsk Oblast
