= 74th Separate Guards Motor Rifle Brigade =

94th Guards Rifle Division (1943–1957) 94th Guards Motor Rifle Division (1957–1992) 74th Guards Motor Rifle Brigade (1993–present)
- Russian: 74-я гвардейская мотострелковая Звенигородско-Берлинская орденов Кутузова и Суворова бригадa
- Brigade shoulder sleeve insignia
- Active: 1 January 1993–present
- Country: USSR (until 1991); Russia (1991–present)
- Branch: Soviet Army (until 1991); Russian Ground Forces
- Type: Mechanized infantry
- Size: Brigade
- Part of: 41st Combined Arms Army; Central Military District
- Garrison/HQ: Yurga; MUN 21005
- Nickname: Zvenigorodskoye-Berlin
- Engagements: First Chechen War; Battle of Grozny; Second Chechen War; Russian invasion of Ukraine; Siege of Chernihiv; Battle of the Siverskyi Donets; Battle of Avdiivka
- Decorations: Order of Kutuzov, 2nd Class; Order of Suvorov 2nd Class
- Battle honours: Guards

Commanders
- Current commander: Lieutenant Colonel Pavel Ershov

The 74th Guards Motor Rifle Zvenigorod-Berlin Orders of Kutuzov and Suvorov Brigade (Russian: 74-я отдельная гвардейская мотострелковая Звенигородско-Берлинская орденов Кутузова и Суворова бригадa; MUN 21005) is a military formation of the Russian Ground Forces's 41st Combined Arms Army, part of the Central Military District, stationed in Yurga, Kemerovo Oblast, Russia. The brigade was created by reforming the 94th Guards Motor Rifle Division withdrawn from the GDR in the early 1990s.

== History ==
=== Early years and WWII ===
The 74th Motor Rifle Brigade was created from the disbanded 94th Guards Zvenigorod-Berlin Order of Suvorov Motor Rifle Division, formerly called the Group of Soviet Forces in Germany. The 94th Guards Rifle Division was formed on 23 April 1943 in the eastern Ukraine as a consolidation of the 14th Guards and 96th Rifle Brigades. It took part in the liberation of southern Ukraine through the remainder of 1943 and into 1944 as part of the 5th Shock Army. It remained with the Army through the remainder of the war and ended in the streets of Berlin. Post-war, it remained with the 5th Shock Army for a period, then transferred to the 3rd Army.

In 1957, it was one of the few Rifle Divisions to be reorganized into a Motor Rifle Division and still retained its original number. In the mid-1980s, it was transferred to the 2nd Guards Tank Army, where it remained until withdrawn from East Germany in 1991. After arriving in Yurga (near Tomsk) in the Siberian Military District, it was reorganized into the 74th Guards Motor Rifle Brigade, where it remains today. Other units also became part of the 74th Guards Motor Rifle Brigade including a guards engineering battalion and the 386th Tank Regiment.

=== After the Collapse of the Soviet Union (1993–2015) ===
Between 30 December 1994 and April 1995, the brigade's personnel carried out a combat missions in the First Chechen War. On the night of December 31, 1994 to January 1, 1995, a brigade of 1,274 soldiers, 45 tanks, 115 BMP-1s entered Grozny, and in addition, the brigade's fighters captured the villages of Ilyinovskaya and Petropavlovskaya. In total, 128 servicemen of the 74th Brigade were killed during the conflict, and more than 700 people from there were awarded government awards. The brigade then returned to Chechnya in 1999-2001 as part of the counter-terrorist operation during the Second Chechen War.

On February 3, 2005, Russian defense minister Sergei Ivanov visited the brigade and promised that by the end of 2006, the brigade would be composed fully of professional soldiers, not conscripts. He also said the brigade was one of the most combat ready of the entire Russian military, adding a promise of new barracks construction.

By 2005, the commander was Major General Farid Balaliyev. Elements of the brigade have also participated in the Russian military intervention on the Syrian Civil War. In 2014, Defense Minister Sergei Shoigu presented the brigade with the Order of Kutuzov for the successful completion of combat training missions. In 2015, the 74th Guards Motor Rifle Brigade became the first unit of the Central Military District to be fully re-equipped with T-72B3 tanks.

=== Invasion of Ukraine (2022–present) ===
The brigade is also involved in the Russian invasion of Ukraine. A platoon of the 74th Motor Rifle Brigade surrendered to Ukrainian forces near Chernihiv. On 24 February, Ukrainian commander-in-chief Valerii Zaluzhnyi announced that a reconnaissance platoon of the Russian 74th Motorized Rifle Brigade had surrendered near Chernihiv, with the unit's commander claiming "nobody thought that we were going to kill". A member of the brigade was accused by Ukrainian prosecutors of detaining a civilian in the village of Sloboda, Chernihiv Oblast on 6 March.

On 8 March, the brigade conducted a river crossing of the Desna River in Chernihiv Oblast without setback. Elements of the brigade were among the units that attempted to cross the Siverskyi Donets River, near Bilohorivka, between May 8th and 10th; reportedly losing over 485 out of 550 men and 80 vehicles, and perhaps up to 1,000 to 1,500 of 2,000, and 100 vehicles.

The Institute for the Study of War noted that despite their previous successful river crossing, the brigade's commanders may have underestimated improved Ukrainian artillery capability or may have been unable to control troop movements during the crossing.

== Structure ==
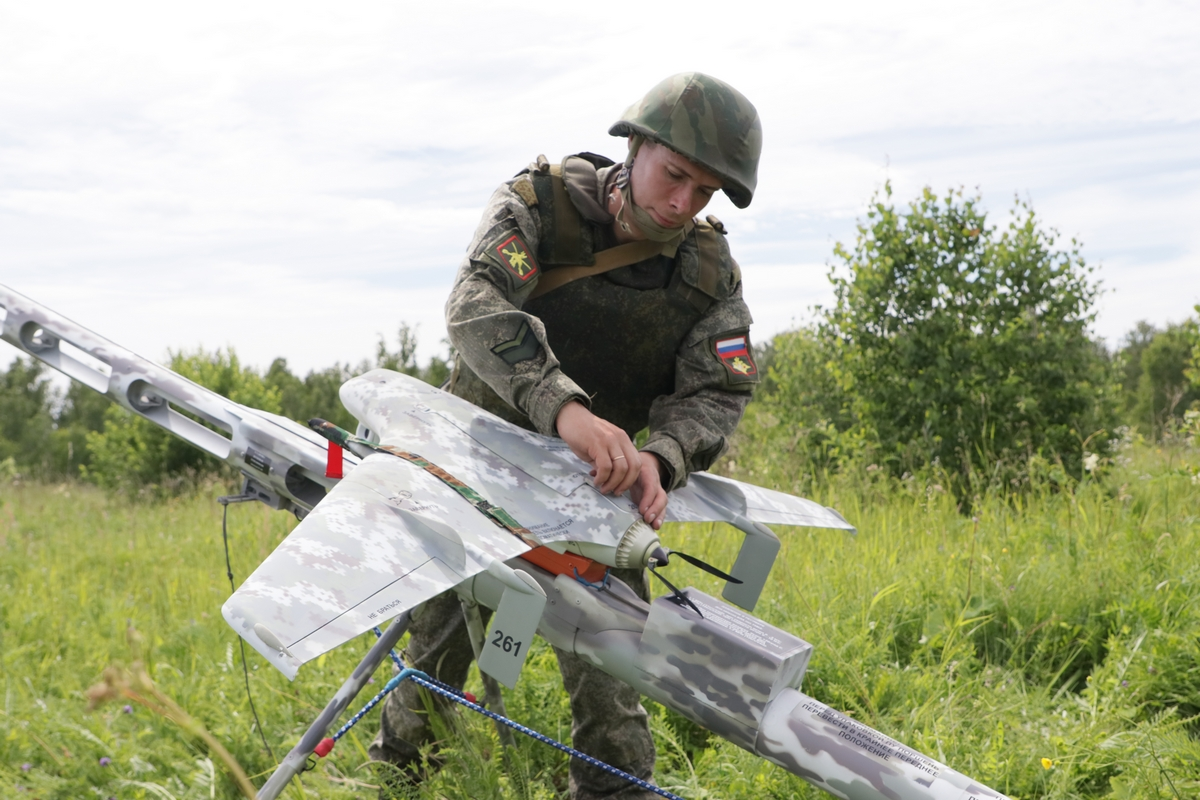
Unmanned aerial vehicle (UAV) Eleron-3SV during inspection of the 74th Guards Separate Motor Rifle Brigade by the Defense Ministry in 2019.

Structure of the 74th Separate Guards Motor Rifle Brigade in 2017

- Brigade HQ;
- 867th Motorized Rifle Battalion;
- 873rd Motorized Rifle Battalion;
- 880th Motorized Rifle Battalion;
- 13th Tank Battalion;
- 227th Howitzer Self-Propelled Artillery Battalion;
- 230th Howitzer Self-Propelled Artillery Battalion;
- Rocket Artillery Battalion;
- 237th Anti-Tank Artillery Battalion;
- 243rd Anti-Aircraft Missile Battalion;
- Anti-Aircraft Missile and Artillery Battalion;
- Reconnaissance Battalion;
- Engineer Battalion;
- Repair Company;
- Logistics Battalion;
- Control (Communications) Battalion;
- Control and Artillery Reconnaissance Battery (Chief of Artillery);
- Control and Radar Reconnaissance Platoon (Chief of Air Defense);
- Rifle company (snipers);
- Electronic Warfare Company;
- NBC Protection Company;
- UAV Company;
- Control Platoon (Chief of Reconnaissance Department);
- Commandant company;
- Medical company;
- Instructor platoon;
- Simulator platoon;
- Training ground;
- Orchestra.

== Units in 1989–1990 ==
Assigned units:

- Division Headquarters – Schwerin 53° 37’ 00” North, 11° 25’ 00” East
- 204th Guards Motor Rifle Regiment (BMP) – Schwerin 53° 36’ 10” North, 11° 25’ 20” East
- 286th Guards Motor Rifle Regiment (BTR) – Schwerin 53° 35’ 40” North, 11° 26’ 00” East
- 288th Guards Motor Rifle Regiment (BTR) – Wismar 53° 53’ 30” North, 11° 26’ 00” East
- 74th Guards Tank Regiment – Schwerin 53° 36’ 20” North, 11° 25’ 20” East
- 199th Guards Self-Artillery Regiment – Wismar 53° 53’ 30” North, 11° 26’ 00” East
- 896th Anti-Aircraft Missile Regiment – Schwerin 53° 36’ 50” North, 11° 22’ 30” East
- 28th Separate Tank Battalion – Schwerin 53° 36’ 50” North, 11° 22’ 30” East
- 496th Separate Anti-Tank Artillery Battalion – Schwerin 53° 38’ 40” North, 11° 25’ 30” East
- 12th Separate Reconnaissance & Radio EW Battalion – Schwerin 53° 34’ 40” North, 11° 26’ 30” East
- 159th Separate Guards Signals Battalion – Schwerin 53° 37’ 00” North, 11° 25’ 00” East
- 107th Separate Guards Engineer-Sapper Battalion – Schwerin 53° 35’ 40” North, 11° 26’ 00” East
- Unidentified Independent Chemical Defense Battalion
- 52nd Separate Repair-Reconstruction Battalion
- 90th Separate Medical-Sanitation Battalion
- 1130th Separate Material Support Battalion

== Commanders ==
=== Brigade commanders ===
- Lieutenant Colonel Mikhail Davydov (1993)
- Arkady Bakhin (1993-1995)
- Aleksey Avdeev (1995-199?)
- Colonel Alexandr Melnikov (199?–2000)
- Major General Farid Balaliev (2000-2002)
- Colonel Gordeev (2002–2007)
- Major General Oleg Tsokov (2007-2009)
- Acting Colonel Rogalev
- Major General Artur Shemaitis (2011-2014)
- Colonel Vyacheslav Gurov (2014–2017)
- Major General Vladimir Ashito (2017–2019)
- Colonel Nikolai Shubin (2019-2021)
- Lieutenant Colonel Pavel Ershov (2021–present)

=== Deputy Brigade Commanders ===
- Colonel Oleg Tsokov (2004–2006)
