= Mykola Shapoval =

Ukrainian general (1886–1948)

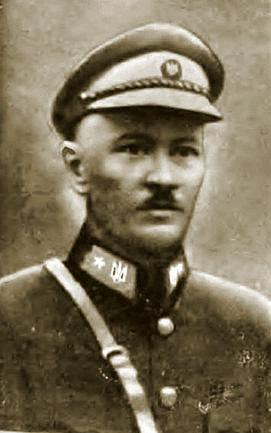
Mykola Shapoval

Mykola Shapoval (Ukrainian: Микола Юхимович Шаповал, Mykola Yukhymovych Shapoval) (1886–1948) was a military, public and political figure, Major General of the Ukrainian People's Army. He was a brother to Mykyta Shapoval and Artem Shapoval and married to Antonina Hladun.

Mykola Shapoval was born in a village of Serebryanka in Bakhmut county (Yekaterinoslav Governorate) in a family of retired non-commissioned officer Yukhym Oleksiyovych and Natalya Yakivna Shapovals.

Mykola Shapoval graduated from a philology faculty of the Kiev University. After being drafted to the army, Shapoval studied at the Chuguyev Junker Infantry College and upon its graduation he received a rank of First Lieutenant (podporutchik).

During the World War I Shapoval was wounded in the Eastern Prussia and captured by Germans. He was taken to the Rastatt camp and later to Biała Podlaska in Southern Podlasie. After his release Shapoval became one of the organizers of the Ukrainian Blue-coats Division, becoming a commander of the 1st Zaporizhia Regiment of Shevchenko. In 1919 Shapoval commanded the 7th Infantry Division and the Podillia group of the Ukrainian People's Army. He eventually became a commander of the 16th Team (later - the 3rd Iron Division) and was a director of the Kamyanka Youth School.'

While being interned in Poland Shapoval headed the Joint Youth School in internment camps and after 1924 he moved to Czechoslovakia and France. Shapaval was affiliated with the Ukrainian Socialist-Revolutionary Party and headed its center in France. From 1929 to 1948 Shapoval was a head of the Ukrainian Community in France (Ukrayinska Hromada). During the Battle of France he was once again captured and until 1944 spent time in the Nazi concentration camps.

Shapoval is an author of numerous books and articles in France. He died in 1948 and is buried in Sochaux.
