= Brazhkivka =

Village in Kharkiv Oblast, Ukraine

Brazhkivka Бражківка
- Village
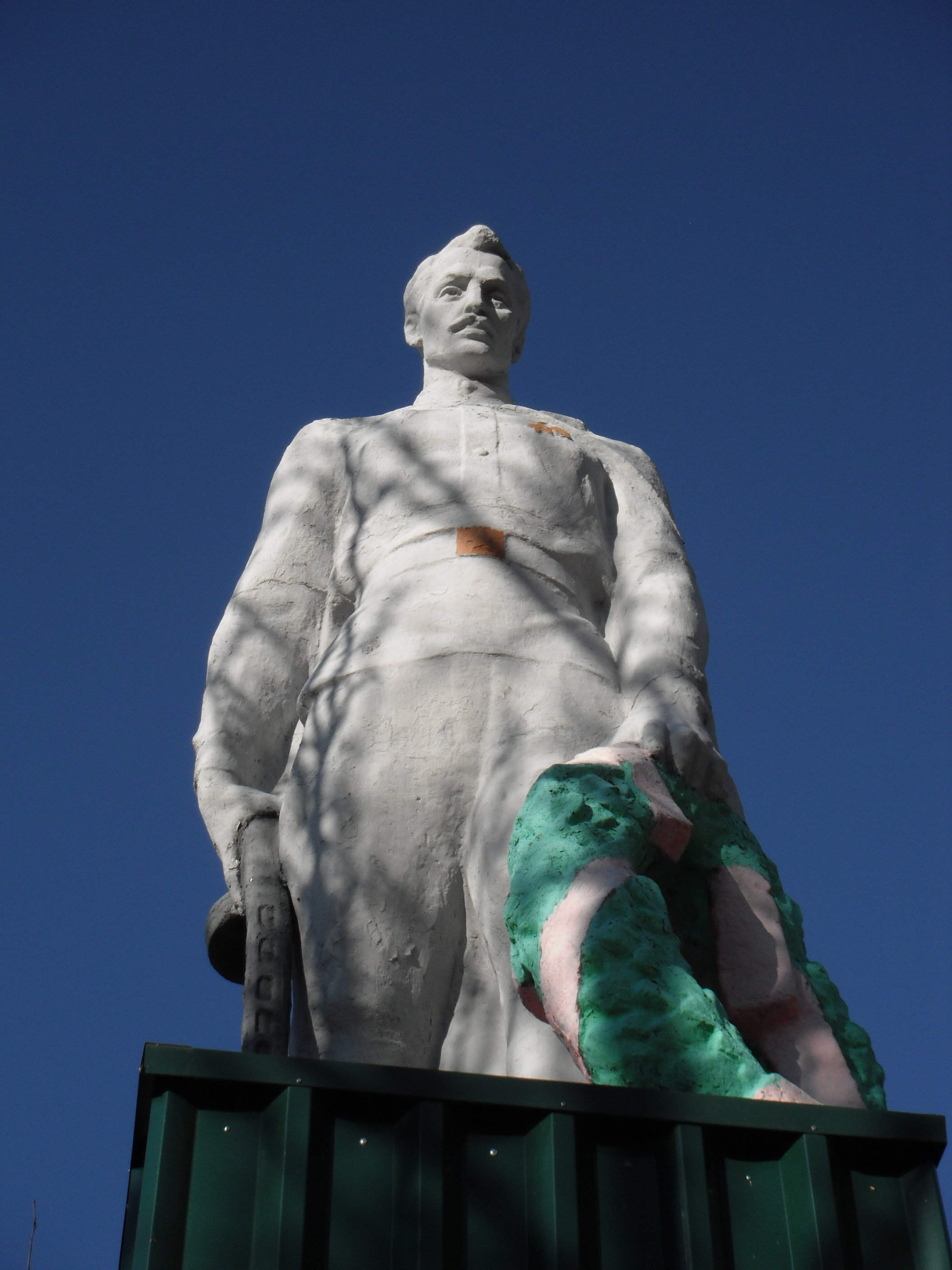
- This is a photo of a monument in Brazhkivka, Ukraine
- Interactive map of Brazhkivka
- Location of Brazhkivka within Ukraine Brazhkivka (Ukraine)
- Coordinates: 49.043333°N 37.213333°E
- Country: Ukraine
- Oblast: Kharkiv Oblast
- District: izium Raion

Area
  - Total: 0.714 km^{2} (0.276 sq mi)
- Elevation: 139 m (456 ft)

Population
  - Total: 330
  - Density: 460/km^{2} (1,200/sq mi)
- Time zone: UTC+2 (EET)
  - Summer (DST): UTC+3 (EEST)
- Postal code: 64344
- Area code: +380 5743

Brazhkivka (Ukrainian: Бражківка; Russian: Бражковка) is a village in Izium Raion (district) in Kharkiv Oblast of eastern Ukraine, at about 100 kilometres (62 mi) SSE from the centre of Kharkiv city. It belongs to Oskil rural hromada, one of the hromadas of Ukraine.

The village came under attack by Russian forces in June 2022, during the Russian invasion of Ukraine.

On April 3, 2022, the village was occupied by Russian troops. On August 28, according to the General Staff of the Armed Forces of Ukraine, Brazhkivka is under the control of the Armed Forces of Ukraine.
