= Dronivka =

Dronivka Дронівка
- Village
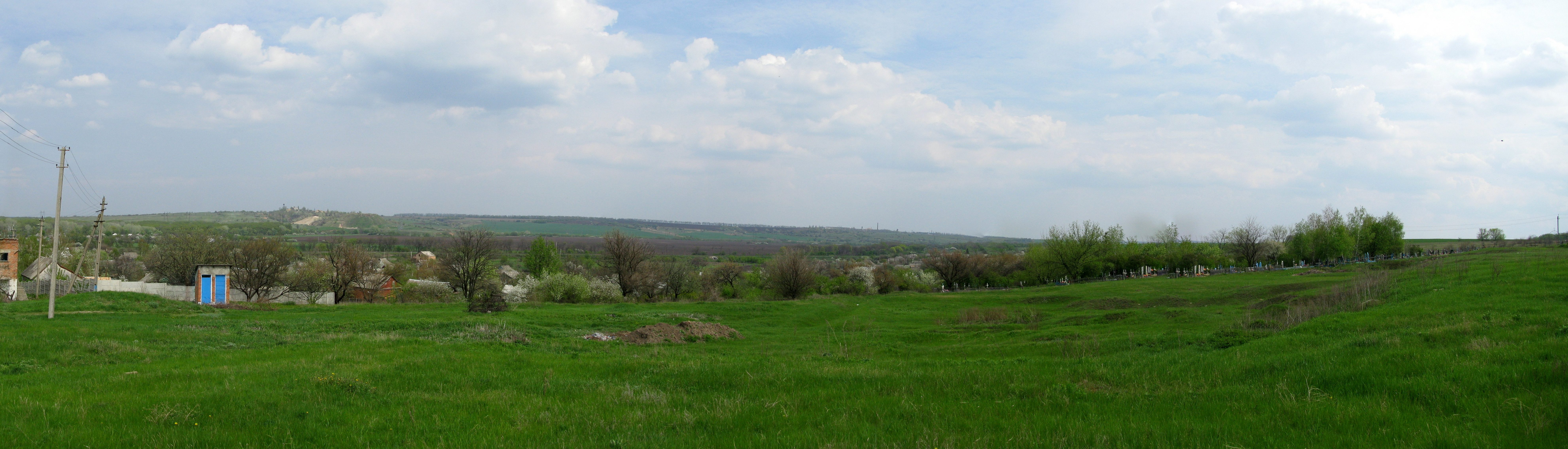

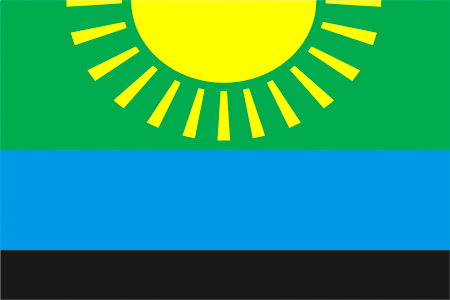
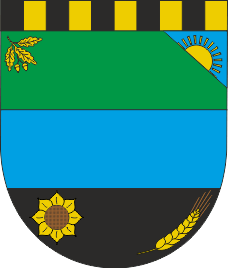
- Flag Coat of arms

- Location of Dronivka within Ukraine Dronivka (Ukraine)
- Coordinates: 48.917778°N 38.041389°E
- Country: Ukraine
- Oblast: Donetsk Oblast
- Raion: Bakhmut Raion
- Hromada: Siversk urban hromada

Area
  - Total: 0.97 km^{2} (0.37 sq mi)
- Elevation: 58 m (190 ft)

Population (01.01.2016)
  - Total: 485
  - Density: 500/km^{2} (1,300/sq mi)
- Time zone: UTC+2 (EET)
  - Summer (DST): UTC+3 (EEST)
- Postal code: 84521
- Area code: +380 6274

Dronivka (Ukrainian: Дронівка) is a village (selo) in Bakhmut Raion, Donetsk Oblast, Ukraine.

== History ==
During the Holodomor from 1932 to 1933, 37 people in the village died.

=== Russo-Ukrainian War ===
During the Russian invasion of Ukraine, Russian soldiers attempted to cross the Siversky Donets several times. In particular, in May 2022, they brought pontoons across the river near Dronivka (48.938486°N 38.060246°E and 48.938332°N 38.059901°E) and Bilohorivka. On 12 May 2022, the crossing was thwarted, and Russian forces suffered severe losses. On 24 October 2025, the Russian defense ministry claimed capture over the village was by Russian forces.

== Demographics ==
In the 1989 USSR census, the population of the village was given as 708 people, of whom 310 were men and 398 were women.

In the 2001 Ukrainian Census, the population was given as 613 people.

=== Languages ===
In 2001, the population distribution by language was:

Language	%
Ukrainian	83.69 %
Russian	15.99 %
Belarusian	0.33 %
