= Russo-Ukrainian war (2022–present) order of battle =

This is the order of battle for the Russo-Ukrainian war (2022–present). It should not be considered complete, up-to-date, nor fully accurate, being based on open-source press reporting.

An updated order of battle estimate for 23 April 2023, by the Institute for the Study of War is accessible at:

- Russian Offensive Campaign Assessment, 23 April

Another ISW-relevant publication, published in October 2023:

- Russian Regular Ground Forces Order of Battle: Russian Military 101

== Russian forces in 2022 ==
Senior commanders for the 2022 invasion of Ukraine

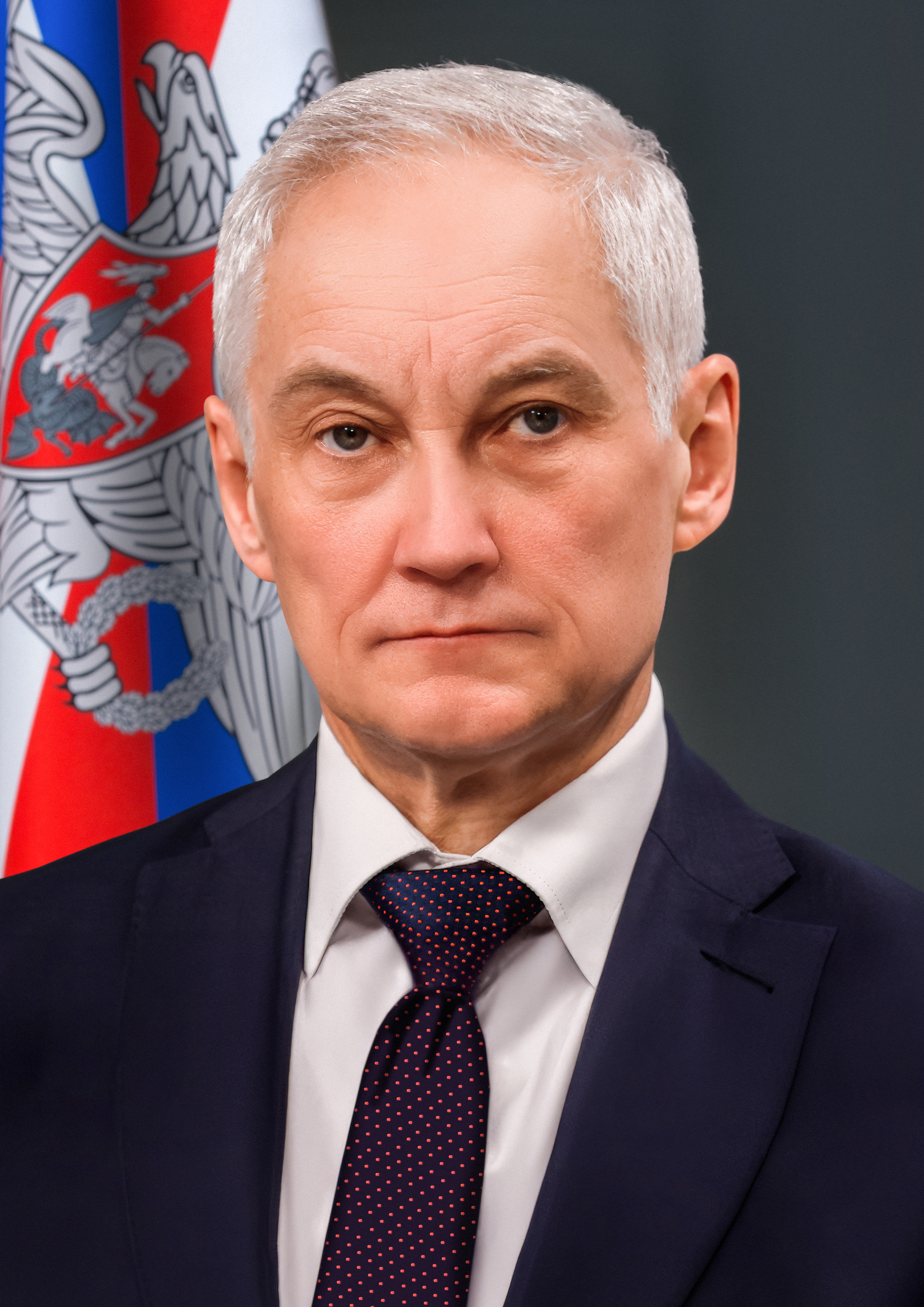
Andrey Belousov, Minister of Defence since May 2024

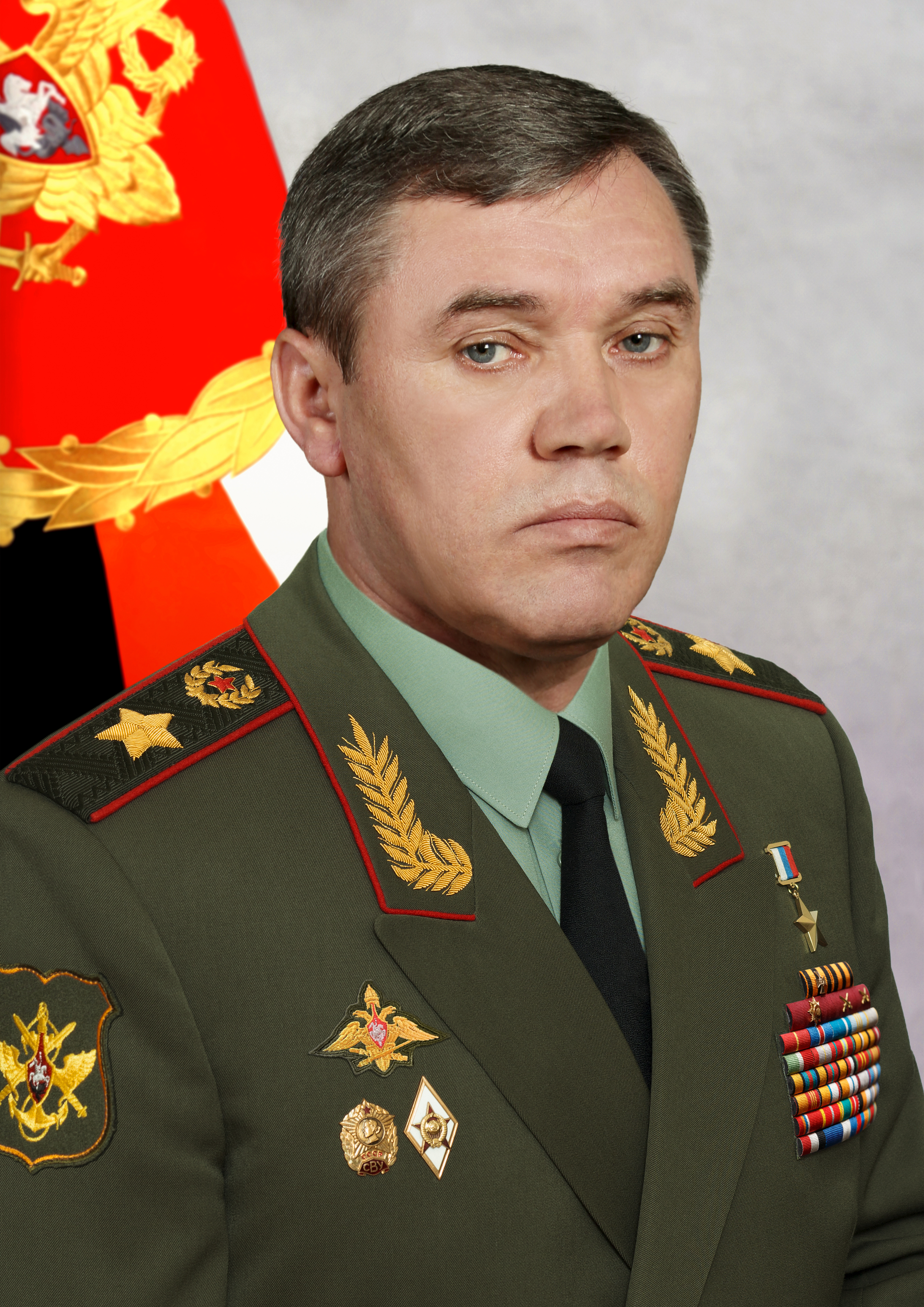
General of the Army Valery Gerasimov, Chief of the General Staff and commander of Russian forces in Ukraine

=== Administrative chain of command ===
Commanders of the various MOD armed services and branches do not have operational control over the forces. They are responsible for force development and generation. The Chiefs of the ground forces, aerospace forces, navy, strategic missile forces, and airborne forces also hold the appointments of Deputy Ministers of Defence, junior to the Chief of the General Staff, who is the First Deputy Minister of Defence.

The General Staff commands and controls forces through the National Defence Management Centre (NDMC). Operational control of the forces was carried out by the five Operational-Strategic Commands—the Western, Southern, Central, and Eastern Military Districts and the OSK Northern Fleet, which is their equal. The Western and Southern Military Districts share borders with Ukraine and are directly involved in command and control of operations.

Pre-2022 Russian military doctrine had specified that on the outbreak of war, armed forces from non-MOD services (like Rosgvardiya) would be placed under the General Staff.

- (President of the Russian Federation: Supreme Commander-in-Chief Vladimir Putin)
  - Security Council
    - Rosgvardiya (General of the Army Viktor Zolotov; Deputy Commander Lieutenant General Roman Gavrilov)
  - Federal Security Service (General of the Army Alexander Bortnikov)
    - Russian Border Guards (Deputy Director of the Federal Security Service and Head of the Border Service: Vladimir Kulishov)
  - Federal Protective Service (Director of the Federal Protective Service: General Dmitry Kochnev)
  - Ministry of Internal Affairs (Minister of Internal Affairs: Vladimir Kolokoltsev)
    - Police of Russia
  - Ministry of Defence (Minister of Defence: Andrey Belousov)
    - Russian General Staff (Chief of the General Staff: General of the Army Valery Gerasimov, First Deputy Chief of the General Staff Nikolay Bogdanovsky); National Defense Management Center (Colonel General Mikhail Mizintsev)
      - GRU (Director: Admiral Igor Kostyukov)
        - 8th Directorate - Directorate Spetsnaz (Spetsnaz GRU)
      - Unmanned Systems Forces of Russia (Colonel General Denis Lyamin)
      - Russian Ground Forces (Commander-in-Chief of the Russian Ground Forces and Deputy Minister of Defence: General of the Army Oleg Salyukov)
        - Russian Engineer Troops (Lieutenant General Yuri Stavitsky)
        - Russian Missile Troops and Artillery (Lieutenant-General Mikhail Matveyevsky)
        - Russian Tank Troops
        - Air Defence Troops of the Russian Ground Forces
        - Russian Army Aviation
      - Logistical Support of the Russian Armed Forces (Colonel General Mikhail Mizintsev, who replaced Army General Dmitry Bulgakov in September 2022)
        - Russian Railway Troops
      - Russian Aerospace Forces (Commander-in-Chief of the Aerospace Forces and Deputy Minister of Defence: General of Army Sergey Surovikin)
        - Russian Air Force (Commander-in-Chief of the Russian Air Force and Deputy Commander-in-Chief of the Aerospace Forces: Lieutenant General Sergey Dronov)
      - Russian Airborne Forces (Vozdushno-desantnye voyska (VDV)) (Commander of the Russian Airborne Forces: Colonel-General Mikhail Teplinsky who replaced Colonel General Andrey Serdyukov in June 2022
      - Russian Navy (Commander-in-Chief of the Russian Navy and Deputy Minister of Defence: Admiral Nikolai Yevmenov)
        - Coastal Troops of the Russian Navy (Lieutenant General Viktor Astapov)
          - Russian Naval Infantry (Lieutenant General Aleksandr Kolpachenko)
        - Russian Naval Aviation (Major-General Igor Kozhin)

=== Initial force groupings ===
Ukrainian military commentator Yuri Butusov listed the following initial March 2022 deployment of Russian/allied forces:

Grouping	Role	Located around	Forces from	Estimated strength
Southwestern Belarus	blocking contingent against Ukrainian forces in Western Ukraine	Brest, Luninyets, Baranavichy, Asipovichy and Minsk	Northern Fleet (200th (Arctic) Motor Rifle Brigade, 61st Guards Naval Infantry Brigade); VDV (76th, 98th Guards Airborne Divisions)	6–7 Battalion tactical group (BTGs)
Southeastern Belarus	Kyiv offensive direction	Vepri, Elsin, Brahin, Khainini, Rechytsa and Mazyr	5th, 35th and 36th Combined Arms Armies (CAA)	7–9 BTGs
Bryansk	Chernihiv offensive direction	Klimovo, Klintsy, Pochep and Sevsk	41st CAA and the 90th Guards Tank Division	3 BTGs
Kursk–Belgorod	Sumy offensive direction	Tomarovka, Vesela Lopan', Zorino, Pristen', Kursk and Belgorod	6th and 20th CAAs	4 BTGs
Voronezh	Kharkiv offensive direction	Stary Oskol, Soloti, Valuyki, Boguchar, Pogonovo and Voronezh	6th Tank and 20th CAAs	13–14 BTGs
Smolensk	operational reserve of the northern front	Yelnya	20th and 41st CAAs	6–7 BTGs
Rostov	Donbas and eastern Sea of Azov offensive direction	Rostov-on-Don and Kamensk-Shakhtinskiy	8th CAA (Note: Ukraine says the 8th CAA has operational control over the Donetsk People's Republic People's Militia and the Luhansk People's Republic People's Militia, naming them the Russian 1st and 2nd Army Corps)	6 BTGs
Crimea	southern Ukraine offensive direction	Crimean Peninsula (Slavne, Dzhankoi, Novoozerne, Yevpatoria, Sevastopol, Oktyabrskoye, Bakhchysarar, Angarskyi, Feodosia, Opuk)	58th CAA; Black Sea Fleet's 22nd Army Corps (810th Guards Naval Infantry Brigade)	up to 13 BTGs
Kuban	operational reserve of the southern front	Kuban Peninsula (Novorossiysk, Korenovsk, Primorsko-Akhtarsk, Krasnodar, Mol'kino and Maykop) and Stavropol	49th CAA; Black Sea Fleet's 22nd Army Corps; VDV's 7th Guards Mountain Air Assault Division	6 BTGs

=== Russian leaders, 2022–23 ===
Despite evolving Russian doctrine, which specified all troops and forces operating from one Operational-Strategic Command (OSK) be placed under one commander, multiple repeated sources (Rochan Consulting, Center for Naval Analysis, British Ministry of Defence) reported that separate groupings of forces drawn from each of the four military districts, under the leadership of senior personnel from that military district, took part in the initial invasion. President Vladimir Putin was repeatedly reported to be very involved, sometimes giving orders to field formations.

According to US officials, the commander of the Russian Southern Military District, Aleksandr Dvornikov, was placed in overall command on 8 April 2022. Analysts of the OSINT organisation CIT speculated that Dvornikov had been replaced by Gennady Zhidko in late May 2022, with US officials quoted in the New York Times also speculating that he had "disappeared". According to Mason Clark of the ISW, since Dvornikov and Zhidko remained "double-hatted" as Military District commanders during their reported terms as overall commanders, they were "first among equals" rather than true theatre commanders.

In October 2022 the Russian ministry of defence officially announced that Sergei Surovikin had been placed in charge of Russia's forces fighting in Ukraine, according to analyst John Hardie writing for the Long War Journal, Surovikin was "likely the operation’s first true unified commander". Surovikin, who Hardie described as "a competent commander" was replaced in January 2023 by Valery Gerasimov. The Russian ministry of defence claimed that Surovikin's replacement was necessitated by the need for a more senior officer to carry out an "amplified range of tasks," and to increase "cooperation between services and branches of the Armed Forces." According to Hardie, Suvorikin's replacement may have reflected "internal power politics".

== Russian forces ==
Since 12 January 2023, Chief of the General Staff Army General Valery Gerasimov was appointed as commander of military operations in Ukraine, with Surovikin as his deputy.

The actual operational chain of command of the Russian military effort in Ukraine is not public, changes, and is a mix of state and non-state bodies. Personal rivalries are evident. President Vladimir Putin, however, remains firmly in control, sometimes micromanaging. The loose connection of various mercenary bodies and Ramzan Kadyrov's Chechens to the official command chain has been represented by placing them under headers separate to the Russian Armed Forces.

It is unclear how tactical fighter, ground attack, and strategic bomber "sorties" (one flight of one aircraft) are scheduled and controlled.

On 18 April 2023, Russian official sources said that President Putin had held meetings in the Kherson area with several commanders. The President "..received reports from the commander of the Dnepr forces grouping, General Lieutenant Oleg Makarevich, the commander of the Vostok [Eastern] forces grouping, General Lieutenant Andrey Kuzmenko, and the deputy commander of the combined grouping, General Colonel Mikhail Teplinsky." The meetings likely took place before 16 April.

Direct Forces under President

- Russia (President of the Russian Federation: Supreme Commander-in-Chief Vladimir Putin)
  - Security Council
    - Russian General Staff (Chief of the General Staff: General of the Army Valery Gerasimov, First Deputy Chief of the General Staff Nikolay Bogdanovsky)
      - National Defense Management Center (Colonel General Mikhail Mizintsev)
      - Long Range Aviation - administratively Aerospace Forces; operationally, air operations centre of whatever description
        - 22nd Guards Heavy Bomber Aviation Division (Colonel Mykola Varpahovych)
          - 52nd Guards Heavy Bomber Aviation Regiment (Tupolev Tu-22M) (Colonel Oleg Timoshyn)

=== Mercenaries and foreign fighters ===
- Wagner Group (Commander: Lieutenant Colonel Dmitry Utkin †)
  - DShRG Rusich (Commander: Alexey Milchakov)
- Gazprom Neft Security
  - Fakel
  - Plamya
- Africa Corps ("Russian Expeditionary Corps")
- Patriot
- Redut ("1st Expeditionary Volunteer Assault Corps") (GRU)
- Redut
  - Union of Cossack Warriors of Russia and Abroad
    - Don Brigade
      - Listan Battalion
    - Terek Brigade
      - Skif Battalion
  - 16th Special Forces Brigade of the GRU
    - Volki ("Wolves") Brigade
    - Tigry ("Tigers") Formation
    - Veter 177 Formation
    - Nevsky Formation
  - Union of Donbass Volunteers
    - Sever ("North") Formation
    - Tsentr ("Center") Formation
    - St. George's Brigade
      - Zubr ("Bison") Formation
      - Kherson Formation
      - Artdivision Formation
      - Vikhr ("Whirlwind") Formation
  - Veterans of Russia Movement
    - Veterans Battalion
  - Gazprom Neft Security
    - Potok ("Flow") Formation
  - Others
    - 81st Special Forces Brigade ("bears")
    - Lev ("Lion") Formation
    - Rysi ("Lynx") Formation
    - Borz Formation
    - ~~Espanola Formation~~ (reorganized in 2025)
    - Troya ("Troy") Formation
    - Irbis ("Snow Leopard") Formation
    - ~~Imperial Legion Formation~~ (left "Redut")
    - ~~Rusich Formation~~ (left "Redut")
- Tsar's Wolves
- Uran
- (North Korea) Korean People's Army (Supreme Leader of the Democratic People's Republic of Korea: Supreme Commander Kim Jong Un)
  - Korean People's Army Ground Force (Commander: Vice Marshal Ri Yong-gil)
    - XI Corps
    - 94th Separate Brigade
  - Korean People's Army Special Operations Forces (Commander: Colonel General Kim Yong Bok)
    - 92nd Special Operations Brigade
    - 94th Special Operations Brigade
- Reconnaissance General Bureau

=== Militias ===
- Storm Ossetia (Commander: Ayvengo Tekhov †) (disbanded on 19 June 2023, restored in an unknown date)
- Alania Battalion
- Vladlen Tatarsky Battalion

=== Reserve units of the Russian Armed Forces ===
- BARS

=== Chechens ===
- Kadyrovites (Head: Colonel General Ramzan Kadyrov)
  - 141st Special Motorized Regiment (Lieutenant Colonel Magomed Tushayev)
    - North Battalion
  - Spetsnaz "Akhmat"
  - 78th Motorized Special Purpose Regiment "North-Akhmat" subordinate to the 42nd Motorised Rifle Division, 58th Combined Arms Army

=== Spetsnaz units ===
Clear evidence as to which Grouping of Forces these brigades belong to is not readily available.

- 2nd Guards Spetsnaz Brigade (Colonel Konstantin Bushuev)
- 3rd Guards Spetsnaz Brigade
- 10th Spetsnaz Brigade
- 14th Guards Spetsnaz Brigade (Colonel Sergey Polyakov †) (formerly Lieutenant Colonel Albert Karimov †)
- 16th Guards Spetsnaz Brigade (Deputy Commander Major Dmitri Vladimirovich Semenov †)
- 24th Guards Spetsnaz Brigade
- 346th Spetsnaz Brigade of the Russian Special Operations Forces

Units returned to Russia:

- 22nd Guards Spetsnaz Brigade returned to Russia to reconstitute in 2022 following major losses. The unit was then redeployed to Ukraine, suffering losses around Melitopol in March 2023.

=== Joint grouping of forces ===
- Centre Grouping of Forces ( Central Military District (TsVO)) (Commander: Lieutenant General Andrey Mordvichev from 17 February 2023 (formerly Major General Alexander Linkov)
  - 2nd Guards Combined Arms Army, CMD (Major General Vyacheslav Nikolaevich Gurov)
    - 91st Headquarters Brigade
    - 21st Guards Motor Rifle Brigade (Colonel Dmitri Zavyalov)
    - 30th Motor Rifle Brigade
    - 385th Guards Artillery Brigade
  - 25th Combined Arms Army (Major General Andrey Seritsky)
    - 67th Motor Rifle Division (Colonel Zulfat Nigmatzyanov)
      - 19th Tank Regiment
      - 31st Motor Rifle Regiment (Bashkortostan)
      - 36th Motor Rifle Regiment
      - 37th Motorised Rifle Regiment
    - 164th Motor Rifle Brigade (Aleysk)
    - 11th Tank Brigade
    - 73rd Artillery Brigade
  - 41st Guards Combined Arms Army, CMD (Lieutenant General Sergey Ryzhkov, Deputy Commander Major General Andrei Sukhovetsky †)
    - 35th Headquarters Brigade
    - 90th Guards Tank Division (Colonel Ramil Rakhmatulovich Ibatullin)
      - 6th Guards Tank Regiment (Colonel Andrei Zakharov †)
      - 80th Tank Regiment
      - 239th Guards Tank Regiment
      - 228th Motor Rifle Regiment (Deputy Commander Lieutenant Colonel Fezul Bichikaev †)
      - 400th Self-Propelled Artillery Regiment
    - 35th Guards Motor Rifle Brigade
    - 55th Mountain Motor Rifle Brigade
    - 74th Guards Motor Rifle Brigade (Lieutenant Colonel Pavel Alekseyevich Yershov)
    - 61st Anti-Aircraft Brigade
  - 201st Military Base, CMD (original location Tajikistan)
  - 202nd Motor Rifle Regiment
  - 28th Pontoon Bridge Brigade
  - 1st Mobile NBC Protection Brigade
  - 31st Guards Air Assault Brigade VDV (Colonel Sergei Karasev †)
- Grouping of Forces "East" ( Eastern Military District (VVO)) (Lieutenant-General Andrei Kuzmenko (unconfirmed) (from late March 2023) (formerly Lieutenant General Rustam Muradov (from June 2022, dismissed April 2023) )
  - 5th Combined Arms Army, EMD (Lieutenant General Aleksey Podivilov)
    - 80th Command Brigade
    - 127th Motor Rifle Division
      - 114th Motor Rifle Regiment
      - 143rd Motor Rifle Regiment
      - 392nd Motor Rifle Regiment
      - 394th Motor Rifle Regiment
      - 433rd Motor Rifle Regiment
      - 1466th Motor Rifle Regiment
      - 218th Tank Regiment
      - 872nd Self-Propelled Artillery Regiment (Lieutenant Colonel Fyodor Evgenievich Solovyov †)
    - 57th Motor Rifle Brigade
    - 60th Motor Rifle Brigade
    - 305th Artillery Brigade
    - 8th Anti-Aircraft Brigade
  - 29th Combined Arms Army, EMD (Major General Andrei Borisovich Kolesnikov)
    - 101st Headquarters Brigade
    - 36th Guards Motor Rifle Brigade (Lieutenant Colonel (Guards) Andrei Vladimirovich Voronkov)
  - 35th Combined Arms Army, EMD (Lieutenant General Aleksandr Semyonovich Sanchik, Deputy Commander Major General Sergei Nyrkov [wounded, not returning to active duty] General-Major Sergey Goryachev, chief of staff.†)
    - 54th Headquarters Brigade
    - 38th Guards Motor Rifle Brigade (Colonel Andrey Borisovich Kurbanov, Deputy Commander Major Sergey Masterov †)
    - 64th Guards Motor Rifle Brigade (Lieutenant Colonel Azatbek Asanbekovich Omurbekov, allegedly responsible for the Bucha massacre) (effectively destroyed by September 2022)
    - 165th Artillery Brigade
    - 69th Covering Brigade
  - 36th Combined Arms Army, EMD (Lieutenant General Valery Solodchuk, Deputy Commander Major General Andrei Anatolyevich Seritskiy, seriously wounded)
    - 75th HQ Brigade
    - 5th Guards Tank Brigade
    - 37th Guards Motor Rifle Brigade (Colonel Marat Hajibalaev †) (formerly Colonel Yuri Medvedev (WIA))
    - 30th Artillery Brigade
    - 103rd Rocket Brigade
    - 26th NBC Protection Regiment
    - 1723rd Anti-Aircraft Regiment
  - 68th Army Corps, EMD (Lieutenant General Dmitry Valeryevich Glushenkov)
    - 18th Machine Gun Artillery Division
      - 46th Machine Gun Artillery Regiment
      - 49th Machine Gun Artillery Regiment
    - 39th Guards Motor Rifle Brigade
    - 338th Guards Rocket Artillery Brigade
  - Naval Infantry of the Pacific Fleet
    - 40th Naval Infantry Brigade
    - 155th Guards Naval Infantry Brigade
  - Airborne Forces
    - 11th Guards Air Assault Brigade VDV (Major General Alexey Naumets (Fired April 2022), Colonel Denis Shishov, Deputy Commander Lieutenant Colonel Denis Viktorovich Glebov †, Deputy Chief of Staff Lieutenant Colonel Pavel Kislyakov †)
    - 83rd Guards Air Assault Brigade VDV (Deputy Commander Guards Lieutenant-Colonel Vitaliy Slabtsov †)
      - 1428th Territorial Defense Motor Rifle Regiment
- Western Grouping of Forces ( Western Military District (ZVO)) (Commander: Lieutenant General Yevgeny Nikiforov,
  - 1st Guards Tank Army, WMD (Lieutenant General Sergey Aleksandrovich Kisel [dismissed]; unnamed deputy commander [dismissed])
    - 60th Command Brigade
    - 2nd Guards Motor Rifle Division (Deputy Commander Lieutenant Colonel Andriy Smirnov – seriously wounded)
      - 1st Guards Tank Regiment (Lieutenant Colonel Denis Lapin)
      - 1st Guards Motor Rifle Regiment
      - 15th Guards Motor Rifle Regiment (Colonel Kharitonov – seriously wounded)
      - 147th Guards Self-Propelled Artillery Regiment
      - 1432nd Motorized Rifle Regiment
    - 4th Guards Tank Division (Colonel Yevgeny Nikolayevich Zhuravlyov)
      - 12th Guards Tank Regiment (S. I. Safonov)
      - 13th Guards Tank Regiment
      - 423rd Guards Yampolsky Motor Rifle Regiment
    - 49th Anti-Aircraft Rocket Brigade (Colonel Ivan Grishin †)
    - 47th Tank Division
      - 26th Tank Regiment
      - 153rd Tank Regiment
      - 245th Guards Motor Rifle Regiment
      - 272nd Motor Rifle Regiment
    - 6th Engineer Regiment (Colonel Mikhail Aleksandrovich Nagamov † [Nagamov was promoted to Deputy Chief of the Engineering Troops of the Western Military District 5 days before he was killed])
    - 27th Guards Motor Rifle Brigade (Colonel Sergey Safonov)
    - 69th Logistics Brigade
    - 96th Reconnaissance Brigade
    - 112th Guards Missile Brigade
    - 202nd Anti-Aircraft Missile Brigade
    - 288th Artillery Brigade (Lieutenant Colonel Oleg Evseev †)
  - 6th Combined Arms Army, WMD (Lieutenant General Vladislav Nikolayevich Yershov [dismissed & arrested])
    - 95th Command Brigade
    - 25th Guards Motor Rifle Brigade
    - 138th Guards Motor Rifle Brigade (Colonel Sergei Maksimov)
    - 9th Guards Artillery Brigade
    - 5th Anti-Aircraft Brigade
    - 26th Missile Brigade
    - 132nd Signals Brigade
    - 1486th Motor Rifle Regiment
  - 20th Guards Combined Arms Army, WMD (Lieutenant General Andrey Sergeevich Ivanaev)
    - 9th Guards Command Brigade
    - 3rd Motor Rifle Division (Major General Aleksei Vyacheslavovich Avdeyev)
      - 237th Tank Regiment
      - 252nd Guards Motor Rifle Regiment (Colonel Igor Nikolaev †)
      - 362nd Motor Rifle Regiment
      - 752nd Guards Motor Rifle Regiment
      - 99th Self-Propelled Artillery Regiment
    - 144th Guards Motor Rifle Division (Lieutenant General Oleg Tsokov from August 2022, (wounded September 2022) †, previously Major General Vitaly Sleptsov)
      - 59th Guards Tank Regiment (Colonel Alexander Bespalov †)
      - 254th Guards Motor Rifle Regiment (Colonel I.A. Danshin)
      - 283rd Motor Rifle Regiment
      - 488th Guards Motorised Rifle Regiment
      - 856th Guards Self-Propelled Artillery Regiment
    - 53rd Anti-Aircraft Missile Brigade
    - 236th Guards Artillery Brigade
    - 448th Rocket Brigade (Colonel Dmitri Nikolaevich Martynov)
    - 232nd Rocket Artillery Brigade
  - 3rd Army Corps
    - 6th Motor Rifle Division
      - 54th Motor Rifle Regiment
      - 57th Motor Rifle Regiment
      - 10th Tank Regiment
      - 27th Artillery Regiment
      - 52nd Anti-Aircraft Missile Artillery Brigade
    - 17th High-Power Artillery Brigade
    - 72nd Motor Rifle Brigade
      - «Alga» battalion (Colonel Yaga - captured)
      - «Molot» battalion
      - Bashkir "Shaimuratova" volunteer battalion
      - Orenburg Oblast "Yaik' volunteer battalion
  - 11th Army Corps, from the Baltic Fleet (Lieutenant General Andrey Ruzinsky)
    - 18th Guards Motor Rifle Division
      - 79th Motor Rifle Regiment
      - 275th Motor Rifle Regiment
      - 280th Motor Rifle Regiment
      - 11th Tank Regiment
      - 22nd Anti-Aircraft Missile Regiment
    - 7th Motor Rifle Regiment
    - 9th Motor Rifle Regiment
    - 152nd Guards Missile Brigade
    - 244th Artillery Brigade
  - 14th Army Corps, from the Northern Fleet (Major-General Boris Fomichev, deputy commander Major-General Vladimir Zavadsky†)
    - 80th Arctic Motor Rifle Brigade
    - 200th Guards Motor Rifle Brigade, (Colonel Denis Yuryevich Kurilo) (reportedly decimated December 2022)
    - 382nd Rocket Artillery Battalion (Lieutenant Colonel Dinar Khametov †)
    - 61st Red Banner Naval Infantry Brigade (Colonel Kirill Nikolaevich Nikulin), from the Northern Fleet
      - 874th Naval Infantry Battalion (Lieutenant Colonel Dmitry Safronov †)
    - 336th Guards Naval Infantry Brigade (Colonel (Guards) Igor N. Kalmykov, Chief of Staff Colonel Ruslan Shirin †), from the Baltic Fleet
  - 45th Svir High-Powered Rocket Artillery Brigade
  - Russian Airborne Forces (VDV)
    - 45th Guards Spetsnaz Brigade (Colonel Vadim Pankov †)
    - 76th Guards Air Assault Division VDV
      - 104th Guards Air Assault Regiment VDV (Lieutenant Colonel Alexander Dosyagaev †)
      - 234th Guards Air Assault Regiment VDV (Deputy Commander Lieutenant Colonel Aleksey Afonin †)
      - 237th Guards Air Assault Regiment VDV (Lieutenant Colonel Georgy Khudik †)
      - 1140th Guards Artillery Regiment VDV
      - 4th Guards Anti-Aircraft Missile Regiment VDV
    - 98th Guards Airborne Division VDV (Guards Colonel Viktor Igoryevich Gunaza [dismissed by end of March], Head of Communications Colonel Alexey Smirnov †)
      - 217th Guards Airborne Regiment VDV (Guards Lt. Colonel Viktor Vasilyevich Droedov)
      - 331st Guards Airborne Regiment VDV (Colonel Sergei Sukharev †, Deputy Commander Lt. Colonel Ivan Pozdeev †, Chief of Staff Lt. Colonel Igor Zharov †) (seriously depleted in fighting near Kyiv)
      - 1065th Guards Artillery Regiment VDV
      - 5th Guards Anti-Aircraft Missile Regiment VDV
    - 104th Guards Airborne Division VDV
      - 328th Airborne Regiment VDV
    - 106th Guards Airborne Division VDV (Guards Colonel Vladimir Vyacheslavovich Selivyorstov (dismissed July 2023), Deputy Commander Colonel Sergey Igorevich Kuzminov †, Deputy Armaments Commander Maxim Kudrin †)
      - 51st Guards Airborne Regiment VDV
      - 119th Airborne Regiment VDV
      - 137th Guards Airborne Regiment VDV (Colonel Andrey Vasilyev †, Deputy Commander Lt. Colonel Pavel Krivov †)
      - 1182 Guards Artillery Regiment VDV
      - 1st Guards Anti-Aircraft Missile Regiment VDV
  - Aerospace Forces
    - 6th Air and Air Defence Forces Army (Lieutenant General Oleg Makovetsky)
      - 332nd Helicopter Regiment (Mil Mi-8, Mil Mi-24)
      - 105th Guards Composite Aviation Division
        - 14th Guards Fighter Aviation Regiment (Sukhoi Su-30) (Deputy Commander Lieutenant Colonel Alexander Pazinich †)
        - 47th Composite Aviation Regiment (Sukhoi Su-34)
        - 159th Guards Fighter Aviation Regiment (Sukhoi Su-35)
        - 790th Fighter Aviation Regiment (Sukhoi Su-35)
    - 11th Air and Air Defence Forces Army (Lieutenant General Vladimir Kravchenko)
      - 112th Helicopter Regiment (Mil Mi-8, Mil Mi-24) (Colonel Vitaly Tabachnikov †)
      - 319th Helicopter Regiment (Mil Mi-24)
      - 303rd Composite Aviation Division
        - 18th Guards Assault Aviation Regiment (Sukhoi Su-25)
        - 23rd Guards Fighter Aviation Regiment (Sukhoi Su-35S)
- Grouping of Forces "South" (YuVO) (Commander: Colonel General Sergey Kuzovlev (from January 2023)) (formerly General of Army Sergei Surovikin), (from June 2022) (Deputy Commander: Lieutenant General Oleg Tsokov †)
  - 8th Guards Combined Arms Army, SMD (Lieutenant General Andrey Nikolayevich Mordvichev, Deputy Commander Major General Esedulla Abachev (from April 2022) (replacing Major General Vladimir Petrovich Frolov †)
    - 20th Guards Motor Rifle Division (Colonel Aleksei Gorobets †) (Deputy Commander Colonel Sergey Nikolaevich Kens †) (Deputy Commander Lieutenant Colonel Aleksey Yurievich Avramchenko †) (Deputy Commander Colonel Kanat Mukatov †)
      - 33rd Motor Rifle Regiment (Lieutenant Colonel Yuri Agarkov †)
      - 255th Motor Rifle Regiment
      - 944th Self Propelled Artillery Regiment
      - 358th Anti-Aircraft Missile Regiment
    - 150th Motor Rifle Division (Major General Oleg Mityaev †)
      - 102nd Motor Rifle Regiment
      - 103rd Motor Rifle Regiment
      - 68th Tank Regiment
      - 163rd Guards Tank Regiment
      - 381st Self Propelled Artillery Regiment
      - 933rd Anti-Aircraft Missile Regiment
    - 238th Artillery Brigade
    - 47th Missile Brigade
    - 78th Anti-Aircraft Missile Brigade
    - 1st Donetsk Army Corps (see below)
    - 2nd Guards Lugansk-Severodonetsk Army Corps (see below)
  - 49th Combined Arms Army, SMD (Lieutenant General Yakov Rezantsev †)
    - 7th Military Base
    - 34th Motor Rifle (Mountain) Brigade
    - 205th Motor Rifle Brigade
    - 1st Guards Rocket Brigade
    - 90th Anti-Aircraft Missile Brigade
    - 439th Rocket Artillery Brigade
    - 227th Artillery Brigade (Colonel Aleksei Viktorovich Repin)
    - 32nd Engineer-Sapper Regiment
  - 58th Guards Combined Arms Army (Lieutenant General Denis Lyamin, formerly Major General Ivan Popov, formerly Lieutenant General Mikhail Stepanovich Zusko)
    - 4th Guards Base (Lt Colonel Alexander Olegovich Koshel, head of the information and psychological counteraction, captured)
    - 19th Motor Rifle Division (Colonel Dmitri Ivanovich Uskov)
      - 429th Motor Rifle Regiment
      - 503rd Guards Motor Rifle Regiment
      - 292nd Self-propelled Artillery Regiment
    - 42nd Guards Motor Rifle Division
      - 70th Motor Rifle Regiment (Lieutenant Colonel Andrei Bezlyudko)
      - 71st Motor Rifle Regiment
      - 291st Motor Rifle Regiment (Lieutenant Colonel Dibir Dibirov
      - 1251st Motor Rifle Regiment†)
      - 78th Motor Rifle Regiment Chechen "Sever-Akhmat" (see above)
      - 50th Guards Self-Propelled Artillery Regiment
    - 49th Air Assault Brigade VDV
    - 100th Reconnaissance Brigade
    - 136th Guards Motor Rifle Brigade (Colonel Roman Demurchiev)
    - 1429th Motor Rifle Regiment
    - 12th Missile Brigade
    - 291st Artillery Brigade
    - 67th Anti-Aircraft Missile Brigade
  - 12th Guards Engineering Brigade (Central Military District, Colonel Sergei Porokhnya †, formerly Colonel Denis Kozlov †)
  - 29th Railway Brigade
  - Airborne Forces
    - 7th Guards Mountain Air Assault Division VDV, Colonel Aleksandr Kornev, reported as the command element of the Russian task force fighting in the Kherson Oblast on the Mykolaiv direction
      - 56th Guards Air Assault Regiment VDV
      - 108th Guards Air Assault Regiment VDV (Colonel Vitaly Vladimirovich Sukuev †)
      - 247th Guards Air Assault Regiment VDV (Colonel Konstantin Zizievsky †)
      - 1141st Artillery Regiment VDV
      - 1537th Anti-Aircraft Missile Regiment
      - 3rd Guards Anti-Aircraft Missile Regiment VDV
    - 52nd Artillery Brigade
  - Black Sea Fleet (Vice Admiral Viktor Nikolayevich Sokolov (from August 2022) replacing Admiral Igor Osipov, Deputy Commander Major General Dmitry Pyatunin (from April 2022) replacing First Rank Captain Andrei Paliy †)
    - Ships
      - 30th Surface Ship Division
        - ~~Cruiser Moskva~~ (sunk)
        - Project 11356 Guided Missile Frigates
          - Admiral Essen (damaged),
          - Admiral Grigorovich,
          - Admiral Makarov (damaged)
        - Project 1135 Guided Missile Frigates
          - Ladny
          - Pytlivyy
      - 41st Missile Boat Brigade
        - Project 1239 Guided Missile Corvette - Hoverborne Bora-class corvette
          - Samum (damaged)
        - Project 1241 Missile ships - Tarantul-class corvette
          - ~~Ivanovets~~ (sunk),
          - 4 other corvettes
        - Project 2163 Missile ships - Buyan-class corvette (4)
        - Project 22800 Missile ships - Karakurt-class corvette
          - Askold (seriously damaged),
          - Tsiklon
      - 4th Submarine Brigade
        - Project 636.2 submarines
          - ~~Rostov na Donu (B-237)~~ (destroyed),
          - 5 other submarines.
        - Project 877 submarine Alrosa (B-871)
      - 197th Assault Ship Brigade
        - Project 1171 landing ships
          - Orsk,
          - Nikolai Filchenkov (damaged),
          - ~~Saratov~~ (Captain 2nd rank Vladimir Khromchenkov †) (sunk).
        - Project 775 landing ships
          - Tsezar Kunikov (sunk) (Captain 3rd rank Aleksandr Chirva †),
          - Olenegorsky Gornyak (damaged),
          - Minsk (damaged, possibly destroyed),
          - ~~Novocherkassk~~ (destroyed),
          - Yamal (damaged),
          - Azov (damaged).
      - 184th Novorossiysk Coastal Defense Brigade
        - Project 1176 Ondatra-class landing craft D-106 (1 x sunk, 1 x damaged)
        - Project 11770 Serna-class landing craft (2 x sunk, 2 x destroyed) (deployed from the Caspian Flotilla)
        - Project 22160 Patrol Boats
          - Vasily Bykov,
          - Dmitri Rogachov,
          - Pavel Derzhavin (damaged)
        - Project 205P Stenka-class patrol boat (Tarantul) (sunk)
      - 388th Marine Reconnaissance Point/1229th Naval Intelligence Center
        - Project 02510 High-speed assault boat ~~BK-16E~~ (sunk)
      - 68th Coastal Defense Ship Brigade
        - Project 03160 Raptor-class patrol boat (2 x sunk - 1 damaged (P-342 Yunarmeets Baltiki)) (Captain 2nd rank Alexander Bobrov †)
        - Project 266M Natya-class minesweeper
          - Ivan Golubets (damaged),
          - 2 other Natya class minesweepers, 2 x Alexandrit-class minesweepers.
      - 519th Squadron
        - Project 18280 Yury Ivanov-class intelligence ship
          - Ivan Khurs (damaged)
      - Auxiliaries
        - Project 22870 rescue tugs
          - ~~Vasily Bekh~~ (sunk),
          - Professor Nikolay Muru (damaged)
        - Project 23120 transport/tug
          - Vsevolod Bobrov (damaged)
    - 18th Combined Arms Army
      - 22nd Army Corps - Black Sea Fleet (Major General Arkady Marzoev, removed April 2022, chief of staff Major General Nasbulin †)
        - 126th Guards Coastal Defense Brigade (Colonel Sergey Storozhenko)
        - 127th Reconnaissance Brigade
        - 291st Artillery Brigade
        - 8th Guards Artillery Regiment (from Black Sea Fleet)
        - 15th Coastal Missile Brigade
        - 103rd Logistics Brigade (Colonel Mikhail Ponomarev, removed April 2022)
        - 177th Naval Infantry Regiment - from the Caspian Flotilla
        - 388th Marine Reconnaissance Unit, from the Black Sea Fleet
        - 810th Guards Naval Infantry Brigade (Colonel Sergey Kens †, formerly Colonel Alexei Sharov †, Deputy Commander Colonel Aleksei Berngard)
        - 854th Coastal Missile Regiment
        - 11th Coastal Missile Brigade
      - 40th Army Corps
        - 47th Motor Rifle Division
        - 144th Motorized Rifle Brigade
      - 70th Motor Rifle Division
        - 24th Motor Rifle Regiment
        - 28th Motor Rifle Regiment
      - 74th Artillery Brigade
    - Aviation of the Black Sea Fleet (+attached Naval Aviation from elsewhere)
      - 2nd Guards Naval Aviation Division
        - 43rd Marine Assault Aviation Regiment (Sukhoi Su-24, Sukhoi Su-30)
  - Aerospace Forces
    - 4th Air and Air Defence Forces Army (Lieutenant General Nikolai Vasilyevich Gostev)
      - 55th Helicopter Regiment (Mil Mi-8, Mil Mi-24)
      - 1st Guards Composite Aviation Division (Major General Tagir Gadzhiyev)
        - 3rd Guards Fighter Aviation Regiment (Sukhoi Su-27, Sukhoi Su-57) (Colonel Anatoly Stasyukevich †)
        - 31st Guards Fighter Aviation Regiment (Sukhoi Su-30) (Deputy Commander Lieutenant Colonel Aleksey Khasanov †)
        - 559th Bomber Aviation Regiment (Sukhoi Su-34)
      - 4th Composite Aviation Division
        - 960th Assault Aviation Regiment (Sukhoi Su-25)
      - 27th Composite Aviation Division
        - 37th Composite Aviation Regiment (Sukhoi Su-24, Sukhoi Su-25)
        - 38th Fighter Aviation Regiment (Sukhoi Su-27)
        - 39th Guards Separate Helicopter Regiment (Mil Mi-8, Mil Mi-28, Mil Mi35, Ka-52) (Deputy Commander Lieutenant Colonel Viktor Igorevich Pakholsky †)
      - 20th Air Defense Regiment
- Storm-Z penal military units (Commander: Yevgeny Burdinsky)
- National Guard of Russia
  - OMON
  - SOBR
- Donetsk People's Republic (Supreme Commander-in-Chief: Head of the DPR Denis Pushilin)
  - Donetsk People's Republic People's Militia (Major General Denis Sinenkov)
    - 1st Donetsk Army Corps (Lieutenant General Roman Kutuzov †) (part of Russian armed forces from 31 December 2022) (under command of 8th Combined Arms Army of Southern Military District)
      - 1st Motor Rifle Slavyansk Order of the Republic Brigade
        - 1453rd Regiment
        - 1439th Regiment
      - 5th Motorised Rifle Brigade (Major General Pavel Klimenko †)
      - 9th Guards Motor Rifle Brigade
      - 110th Guards Motor Rifle Brigade
        - Pyatnashka Brigade
      - 114th Guards Motorised Rifle Brigade
      - 132nd Guards Motor Rifle Brigade
      - 14th Guards Artillery Brigade "Kalmius"
      - Assorted regiments and battalions
        - Sparta Battalion (Yaroslav Shkurgan †, formerly Vladimir Zhoga †)
        - Somalia Battalion (Timur Kurilkin)
        - 23rd Anti-Aircraft Missile Battalion
        - 1454th Self-Propelled Artillery Regiment
        - 103rd Motor Rifle Regiment
        - 105th Motor Rifle Regiment
        - 107th Motor Rifle Regiment
        - 109th Motor Rifle Regiment
        - 113th Motor Rifle Regiment
        - 115th Motor Rifle Regiment
        - 95th Motor Rifle Regiment (formerly 123rd Motor Rifle Regiment)
        - 125th Motor Rifle Regiment
        - 127th Motor Rifle Regiment
- Luhansk People's Republic (Supreme Commander-in-Chief: Head of the LPR Leonid Pasechnik')
  - Luhansk People's Republic People's Militia
    - 2nd Guards Lugansk-Severodonetsk Army Corps (part of Russian armed forces from 31 December 2022) (under command of 8th Combined Arms Army of Southern Military District)
      - 4th Motor Rifle Brigade(Colonel Vyacheslav Makarov †)
      - 15th Motor Rifle Brigade
      - 85th Motorised Rifle Brigade
      - 88th Motorised Rifle Brigade
      - 123rd Guards Motor Rifle Brigade
      - 7th Guards Motor Rifle Brigade (Lieutenant Colonel Andrey Vladimirovich Panasyura †)
      - 10th Artillery Brigade
      - Cossack Assault Corps
        - 6th Cossack Motorized Rifle Brigade
          - Cossack battalions (Mikhail Kishchik †, Deputy Chief of Staff Lt. Col. Alexander Kalnitsky †)
        - "Don" Cossack Brigade
        - "Siberia" Cossack Brigade
        - "Volga" Cossack Brigade
        - "Terek" Cossack Brigade
      - Assorted regiments and battalions
        - Prizrak Brigade (Yuri Shevchenko)
        - ~~202nd Motor Rifle Regiment~~ (disbanded September 2022)
        - ~~204th Motor Rifle Regiment~~ (disbanded September 2022)
        - 208th "Cossack" Motor Rifle Regiment
        - 254th Motor Rifle Regiment

== Ukrainian forces ==
Senior Ukrainian commanders for the 2022 invasion of Ukraine

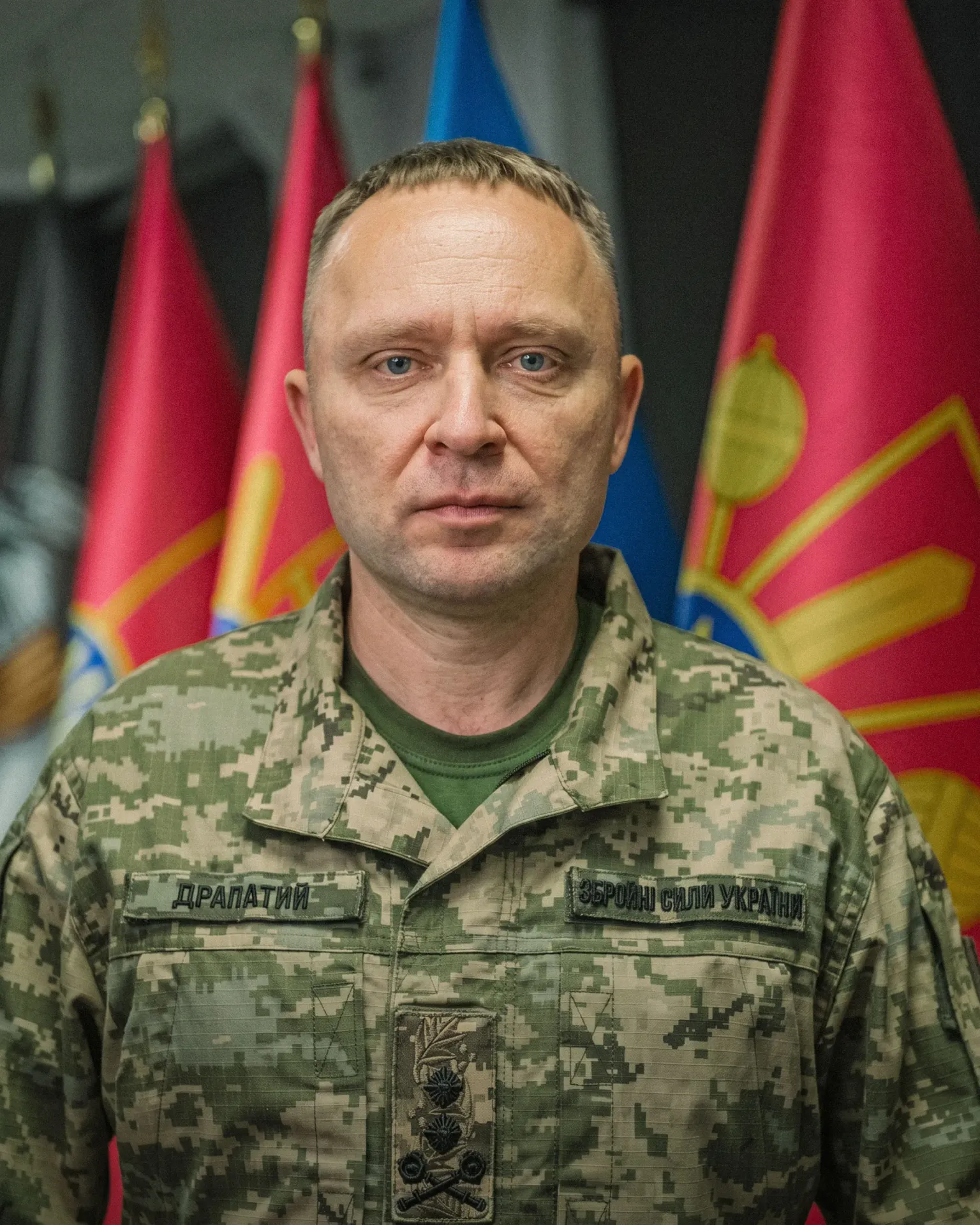
Major General Mykhailo Drapatyi, Commander-in-Chief of the Armed Forces

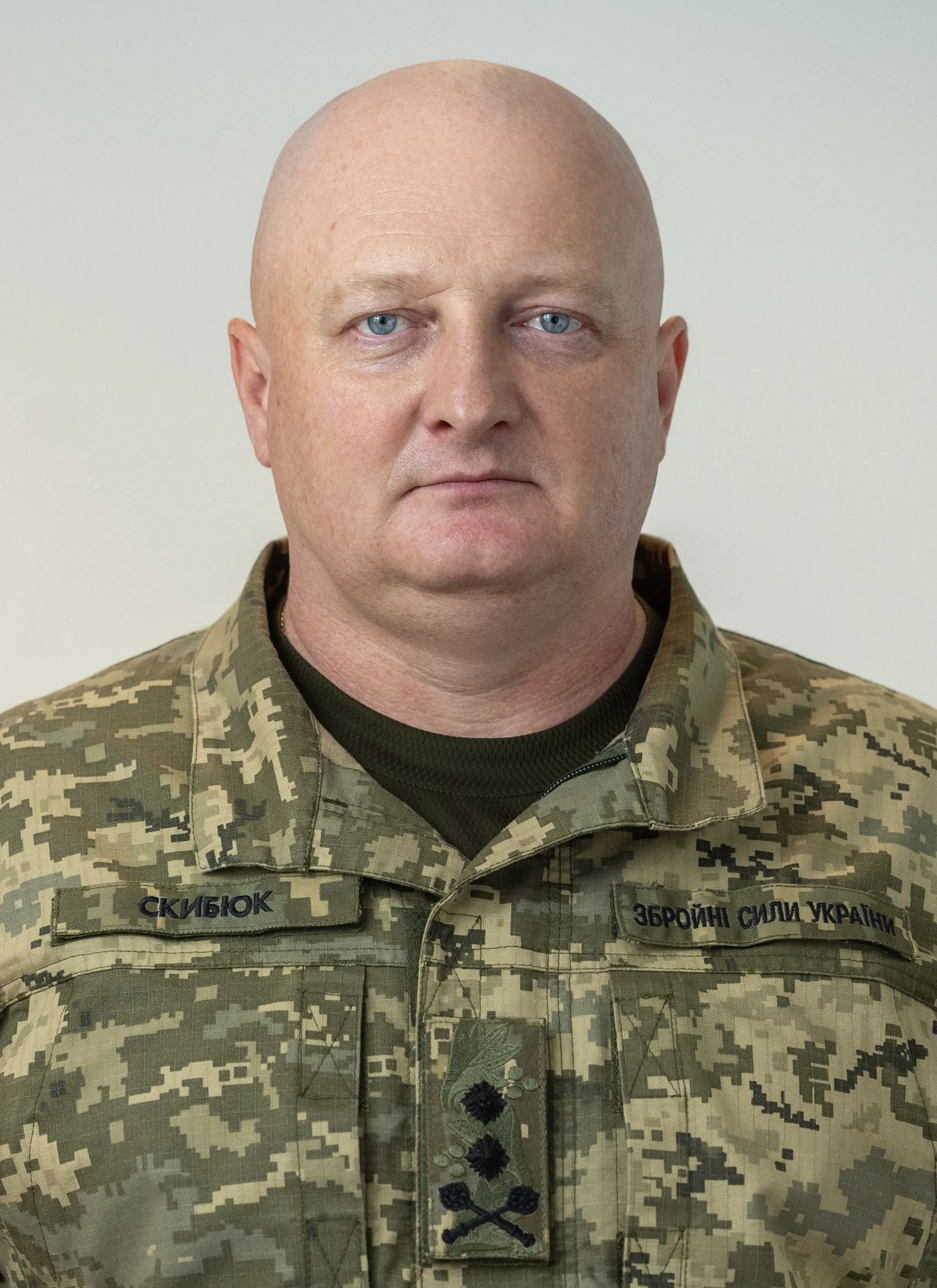
Major General Ihor Skybiuk, Chief of the General Staff

- Ukraine (President: Supreme Commander-in-Chief of the Armed Forces of Ukraine Volodymyr Zelenskyy)
  - Foreign Intelligence Service of Ukraine (FISU Head Oleh Luhovsky (acting))
  - Ministry of Internal Affairs of Ukraine (Interior Minister: Ihor Klymenko)
    - State Border Guard Service of Ukraine (Head of the State Border Guard Service of Ukraine: Serhii Deineko)
      - 1st Hart Brigade
      - 2nd Podilsk Detachment
      - 3rd Pomsta Brigade
      - 5th Sumy Detachment
      - 6th Lutsk Detachment
      - 7th Lviv Detachment
      - 8th Berdyansk Detachment
      - 9th Zhytomyr Detachment
      - 10th WATCH Detachment
      - 11th Forpost Brigade
      - 15th Steel Border Brigade
      - 17th Izmail Detachment
      - 24th Mohyliv-Podilskyi Detachment
      - 25th Bilhorod-Dnistrovskyi Detachment
      - 26th Odesa Detachment
      - 27th Mukachevo Detachment
      - 31st Chernivtsi Detachment
      - 79th Kherson Detachment
      - 94th Chop Detachment
      - Xth Shostka Detachment
      - Phoenix Unmanned Systems Regiment
      - Ukrainian Sea Guard
        - 1st Odesa Sea Guard Detachment
        - 18th Izmail Sea Guard Detachment
        - 23rd Mariupol Sea Guard Detachment
      - Ukrainian Border Guard Aviation
        - 24th Odesa Aviation Squadron
        - 26th Kharkiv Aviation Squadron
    - National Guard of Ukraine (Commander: Brigadier General Oleksandr Pivnenko) (Note: According to the Law "On The National Guard of Ukraine" ("Про Національну гвардію України") Article 6, paragraph 3: "With the enactment of a state of martial law, the National Guard of Ukraine shall be prepared to perform its assigned tasks and shall be subordinated to the Commander-in-Chief of the Armed Forces of Ukraine, except for the military units tasked with escorting and guarding people under arrest and those military units guarding diplomatic missions."))
      - 1st Azov Corps
        - 1st Presidential Operational Brigade
          - 1st Serhii Kulchytskyi Battalion
        - 12th Azov Assault Brigade (Commander: Colonel Denys Prokopenko)
        - 14th Chervona Kalyna Brigade
        - 15th Kara Dag Brigade
      - 2nd Khartia Corps
        - 3rd Spartan Brigade
        - 4th Rubizh Brigade
        - 13th Khartiia Brigade
      - Ukrainian Air Guard
      - Special Operations Center Omega
      - Special Purpose Unit Typhoon
      - National Guard Headquarters Protection & Support Battalion
      - United Communications Node
      - 16th Artillery Brigade
      - 22nd Foreign Diplomatic Missions Protection Brigade
      - 45th Oleksandr Krasitskyi Regiment
      - Public Order Protection Guards
        - 11th Hrushevsky Brigade
          - 18th Public Order Protection Battalion
        - 19th Public Protection Regiment
        - 21st Kalnyshevsky Brigade
        - 23rd Khortytsia Brigade
        - 25th Prince Askold Brigade
        - 31st Oleksandr Radievskyi Brigade
      - Transport Protection Guards
        - 19th Convoy Battalion
        - 27th Pechersk Brigade
        - 34th Convoy Battalion
      - Combined Guard
        - 2nd Galician Brigade
          - 15th Separate Battalion
        - 5th Slobozhansk Brigade
        - 17th Poltavska Brigade
        - 18th Sloviansk Brigade
          - 2nd Special Operations Donbas Battalion (Commander: Lieutenant Colonel Oleksandr Polishchuk)
        - 26th Separate Battalion
        - 27th Separate Regiment
        - 32nd Volyn Battalion
        - 34th Kherson Regiment
        - 35th Sumysky Regiment
        - 40th Danylo Nechai Regiment
          - 13th Separate Battalion
        - 50th Vysochan Regiment
          - 4th Kruk Battalion
        - 75th Zhytomyr Battalion
      - State Objects Protection Guards
        - 2nd Shostkinsky Regiment
        - 4th Pavlograd Regiment
      - CBRN Guards
        - 1st NPP Protection Battalion
        - 3rd NPP Protection Battalion
        - 4th NPP Protection Battalion
        - 5th NPP Protection Battalion
      - ~~12th Operational Brigade~~ (Disbanded in late 2023)
    - Special Tasks Patrol Police
      - Khyzhak Brigade
      - Liut Brigade (Commander: Col. Maxim Kasban †)
        - Safari Regiment
        - Tsunami Regiment (Commander: Col Oleksandr Hostyshchev †)
          - Tavr Battalion
        - Luhansk Regiment
        - Dnipro-1 Regiment
          - 3rd Aerorozvidka Group
          - 4th Kryvbas Company
          - 6th Krym Company
        - Myrotvorets Battalion
        - Skif Battalion
        - Zakhid Battalion
          - Svityaz Company
          - Bohdan Company
        - Enei Battalion
          - Sviatoslav Company
        - Shtorm Battalion
      - Kyiv Regiment
        - Sich Battalion
      - Lviv Battalion
      - Vinnytsia Battalion
      - Chernihiv Battalion
      - Ternopil Battalion
      - Kherson Battalion
      - Poltava Battalion
      - Sumy Company
      - East Company
    - National Police of Ukraine (Chief: Police General 2nd Rank Ihor Klymenko)
      - KORD Brigade
  - Security Service of Ukraine (Head of the Security Service of Ukraine: Brigadier General Vasyl Malyuk)
    - Alpha Group
    - State Special Communications Service of Ukraine
  - National Anti-Corruption Bureau of Ukraine
    - Special Operations Department
  - Irregular civilian volunteers
    - Paramilitary groups
      - Ukrainian People's Self-Defence
      - Freikorps
      - Right Sector-Santa Unit
    - Volunteer NGOS
      - Aerorozvidka (Commander: Inna Honchar)
    - Partisans
      - Yellow Ribbon
      - Popular Resistance of Ukraine
      - Berdiansk Partisan Army
  - Ministry of Defence of Ukraine (Minister of Defence Rustem Umierov)
    - Chief Directorate of Intelligence
      - Defense Intelligence Aviation
        - Special Purpose UAV Unit "Wings"
      - Special Purpose USV Unit "Group 13"
      - 10th Special Purpose Detachment
        - Spetsnaz Unit "Kabul 9"
      - 10th Spetsnaz Battalion "Shaman"
      - Direct Action Unit "Kraken" (Commander: Konstantin V. Nemichev)
      - Spetsnaz Battalion "Artan"
        - Revanche Tactical Group
      - Ghosts (Prymary), special forces unit
      - Tymur Special Operations Unit
        - 2nd Special Operations Detachment
        - 6th Special Operations Detachment
        - Spetsnaz Battalion "Aratta"
        - Spetsnaz Battalion "Sonechko"
        - Spetsnaz Battalion "Stuhna"
        - Spetsnaz Battalion "NOBODY"
        - Spetsnaz Battalion "Bratstvo"
        - Spetsnaz Unit "Chimera"
        - Spetsnaz Unit "Vidar"
        - Spetsnaz Unit "Paragon Company"
        - Spetsnaz Unit "Black Winter Group"
      - Military Unit A3449
        - Freedom of Russia Legion
        - Russian Volunteer Corps (Commander: Denis Kapustin)
        - Sibir Battalion (Commander Vladislav Ammosov)
        - Karelian National Battalion
        - Dzhokhar Dudayev Battalion (Commander: Adam Osmayev)
        - Separate Special Purpose Battalion (Commander Hadzji-Murad Zumso, Deputy commander Khavazhi Amaev)
        - Belarusian Volunteer Corps
        - German Volunteer Corps
        - ~~Terror Battalion~~ (Disbanded in November 2024)
        - Kastuś Kalinoŭski Regiment (Commander: Dzianis Prokharaŭ, Deputy Commander Aliaksiej Skoblia†))
        - Imam Shamil Dagestan Battalion
        - Polish Volunteer Corps
        - Georgian Legion (Commander: Mamuka Mamulashvili)
        - NOMAD Unit
    - State Transport Special Service
      - 1st Prince Lev Brigade
      - 7th Special Purpose Brigade
      - 26th Dnipro Brigade
      - 36th Konotop Brigade
      - 194th Pontoon-bridge Brigade
      - 710th Guards Brigade
      - 711th Demining Brigade
      - 756th Guards Brigade
      - 762nd Guards Brigade
      - 783rd Separate Operational Preparation Brigade
    - Armed Forces of Ukraine (Commander-in-Chief of the Armed Forces: ?, Deputy Commander-in-Chief of the Armed Forces of Ukraine: Lieutenant General Yevhen Moisiuk) (Note: Commanders of the three armed services hold no operational authority. They are subordinated to the commander-in-chief.)
      - Ukrainian General Staff (Chief of the General Staff: Lieutenant General Serhiy Shaptala)
        - 3rd Unified Field Communications Brigade
        - 101st Brigade for the Protection of the General Staff (Commander: Colonel Mykola Shvets)
      - Ukrainian Ground Forces (Commander of the Ground Forces: Lieutenant General Oleksandr Pavliuk)
        - Ukrainian Mountain Infantry Forces
        - Ukrainian Armored Forces
        - Ukrainian Rocket and Artillery Forces (Commander: Colonel Andriy Kolennikov)
        - Ukrainian Mechanised Forces
        - Ukrainian Army Aviation
      - Ukrainian Navy (Commander of the Naval Forces: Vice Admiral Oleksiy Neizhpapa)
        - 1st Minesweeper Division
          - Nikopol
        - 8th Raid Protection Ships Division
          - Netishyn
        - 9th Surface Ships Division
          - ~~Donbas~~ (sunk)
          - ~~Korets~~ (Captured)
          - ~~Kremenchuk~~ (Captured)
          - ~~Vyshhorod~~ (Captured)
          - ~~Ackerman~~ (Captured)
          - ~~Lubny~~ Sunk
        - 28th Auxiliary Division
          - Pochayiv
          - Balta
        - 29th Surface Ships Division
          - ~~Yuri Olefirenko~~ (sunk)
          - ~~Henichesk~~ (sunk)
        - 30th Surface Ships Division
          - ~~Hetman Sahaidachny~~ (Capsized)
          - ~~Sloviansk~~ (sunk)
        - 385th USV Brigade
        - Dnieper Fleet
          - 26th Naval River Ships Division
        - Angels Detachment
        - 801st Underwater Special Forces
        - Ukrainian Naval Aviation (Commander: Colonel Oleh Zahurskyi, Deputy commander: Colonel Ihor Bedzai †)
          - 10th Naval Aviation Brigade (Commander: Colonel Ilya Oleynikov)
      - Ukrainian Marine Corps (Commander: Lieutenant General Dmytro Delyatytskyi)
        - 32nd Marine Artillery Brigade
        - 34th Coastal Defence Brigade
        - 35th Marine Brigade
          - 18th Marine Battalion
          - 88th Marine Air Assault Battalion
          - 137th Marine Battalion
        - 36th Marine Brigade (Commander: Volodymyr Baranyuk - POW)
          - 1st Marine Battalion
          - 501st Marine Battalion
        - 37th Marine Brigade
          - 505th Marine Battalion
        - 38th Marine Brigade
          - 503rd Marine Battalion
        - 40th Coastal Defence Brigade
          - 140th Marine Reconnaissance Battalion
        - 406th Marine Artillery Brigade
        - 426th UAV Battalion
      - Ukrainian Air Force (Commander of the Air Force: Lieutenant General Anatolii Kryvonozhko)
        - 1st Air Force Combined Rifles Brigade
        - 7th Tactical Aviation Brigade (Commander: Colonel Serhiy Blyzniuk, previously Col. Maksim Sikalenko † )
        - 15th Transport Aviation Brigade
        - 25th Transport Aviation Brigade (Commander: Colonel Oleg Zenchenko ]
        - 39th Tactical Aviation Brigade (Commander Col. Oleksandr Dovhach †)
        - 40th Tactical Aviation Brigade (Commander: Colonel Volodymyr Kravchenko, previously Col. Mykhailo Matiushenko †)
        - 114th Tactical Aviation Brigade
        - 204th Tactical Aviation Brigade
        - 299th Tactical Aviation Brigade (Commander: Lieutenant Colonel Andriy Yastrebov)
        - 383rd Unmanned Aircraft Brigade
        - 456th Transport Aviation Brigade
        - 831st Tactical Aviation Brigade
        - Ukrainian Anti-Aircraft Defense Rocket Forces
      - Ukrainian Air Assault Forces (Commander of the Air Assault Forces: Major General Maksym Myrhorodsky, Deputy Commander Brigadier-General Artem Kotenko †)
        - 7th Air Assault Corps
          - 25th Airborne Brigade (Commander: Colonel Yuriy Sodol †)
          - 77th Airmobile Brigade
          - 78th Airborne Assault Regiment
          - 79th Air Assault Brigade (Commander: Colonel Oleksiy Shandr)
            - ~~1st Separate Air Assault Company "Belarus"~~ (Disbanded in 2024)
          - 81st Airmobile Brigade (Commander: Colonel Yevhen Moisiuk)
        - 8th Air Assault Corps
          - 46th Airmobile Brigade (Commander: Colonel Valeriy Skred)
          - 71st Jaeger Brigade
          - 80th Air Assault Brigade (Commander: Colonel Volodymyr Shvorak)
            - 5th Battalion Tactical Group
            - 90th Airmobile Battalion
            - 122nd Airmobile Battalion
          - 82nd Air Assault Brigade (Commander: Lieutenant Colonel Pavlo Rozlach)
          - 95th Air Assault Brigade
            - 13th Airmobile Battalion
          - 148th Air Assault Artillery Brigade
        - 132nd Air Assault Reconnaissance Battalion
        - 421st Unmanned Systems Battalion
      - Special Operations Forces (Commander of the Special Operations Forces: Brigadier General Viktor Khorenko)
        - 1st Special Purpose Detachment
        - 3rd Special Purpose Regiment
        - 8th Special Purpose Regiment
        - 47th Special Purpose Detachment
        - 73rd Naval Special Purpose Center (Commander: Evgeniy Lemeshenko †)
        - 140th Special Operations Center
        - Psychological and Informational Warfare Units
          - 16th Psychological and Information Warfare Center
          - 72nd Psychological and Information Warfare Center
          - 74th Psychological and Information Warfare Center
          - 83rd Psychological and Information Warfare Center
        - Rukh Oporu
          - National Resistance Center
            - Kharkiv Resistance Center
            - Khmelnytskyi Resistance Center
            - Kyiv Resistance Center
            - Oleksandriia Resistance Center
            - Zakarpattia Resistance Center
        - Ranger Corps
          - 4th Special Purpose Ranger Regiment
          - 6th Special Purpose Ranger Regiment
      - Territorial Defense Forces (Commander of the Territorial Defense Forces: Major General Ihor Tantsyura)
        - 101st Territorial Defense Brigade
        - 102nd Territorial Defense Brigade
        - 103rd Territorial Defense Brigade
        - 105th Territorial Defense Brigade
        - 106th Territorial Defense Brigade
        - 107th Territorial Defense Brigade
        - 109th Territorial Defense Brigade
        - 112th Territorial Defense Brigade
        - 114th Territorial Defense Brigade
        - 115th Territorial Defense Brigade
        - 118th Territorial Defense Brigade
        - 126th Territorial Defense Brigade
          - 220th Battalion
          - 225th Territorial Defense Battalion
        - 130th Territorial Defense Battalion
        - 227th Territorial Defense Battalion
        - ~~98th Territorial Defence Battalion 'Azov-Dnipro'~~ (reorganized as a unit of the 3rd assault brigade in January 2023)
      - Unmanned Systems Forces (Commander of the Unmanned Systems Forces: Major Robert Brovdi)
        - "Flying Skull" Battalion
        - 1st Center of the Unmanned Systems Forces
        - 9th Unmanned Systems Brigade (Commander: Colonel Vadym Sukharevsky)
        - 20th Unmanned Systems Brigade
        - 413th Unmanned Systems Regiment
          - "Nachtigall" Unit
        - 412th UAV Regiment
          - ASGARD UAV Battalion
        - 414th Unmanned Strike Aviation Brigade
        - 424th Unmanned Systems Battalion
        - 429th Unmanned Systems Regiment
      - Joint Operational Command of the Armed Forces of Ukraine (MU А0135), Kyiv, (Commander of JOC: Lieutenant General Serhii Naiev) (Note: According to the Law "On The National Security of Ukraine", the commanders of the armed services and separate combat arms generate the combat units and give over operational control over them to the Commander of the Joint Operational Command)
        - Joint Forces Operation (Note: commands the armed forces and security forces contingents facing the Russian-controlled Donbass separatist forces, successor to the previous Anti-Terror Operation (ATO)) (Commander of the JFO: Major-General Eduard Moskaliov)
          - Operational Command North (Commander: Major General Oleksandr Lokota)
            - 10th Army Corps
              - 12th Heavy Mechanized Brigade
              - 43rd Mechanized Brigade
              - 48th Artillery Brigade
              - 115th Mechanized Brigade(Commander: Colonel Ihor Ivanov)
              - 116th Mechanized Brigade
              - 151st Reconnaissance Strike Battalion
            - 16th Army Corps
              - 2nd Battalion International Legion
              - 3rd Heavy Mechanized Brigade
              - 26th Artillery Brigade (Commander: Lieutenant Colonel Andranyk Hasparyan)
              - 41st Separate Mechanized Brigade
              - 57th Motorised Brigade (Commander: Col. Sergeii Lipsy †)
              - 154th Mechanized Brigade
              - 420th Unmanned Systems Battalion
              - 113th Territorial Defense Brigade
            - 21st Army Corps
              - 4th Heavy Mechanized Brigade
              - 93rd Mechanised Brigade (Commander: Colonel Vladislav Klochkov)
              - 152nd Jaeger Brigade
              - 155th Mechanized Brigade
              - 159th Mechanized Brigade
            - 5th Assault Brigade
            - 5th Signal Regiment
            - 12th Support Regiment
            - 27th Rocket Artillery Brigade (Commander: Colonel Yuri Yula †)
            - 43rd Artillery Brigade (Commander: Colonel Oleh Shevchuk)
            - 49th Artillery Brigade
            - 54th Reconnaissance Battalion
            - 72nd Mechanised Brigade (Commander: Colonel Ivan Vinnik)
            - 107th Rocket Artillery Brigade
            - 1020th Anti-aircraft Missile Regiment
            - 1129th Anti-aircraft Missile Regiment
          - Operational Command West (Commander: Lieutenant General Serhiy Litvinov)
            - 14th Army Corps
              - 22nd Mechanized Brigade
              - 42nd Mechanized Brigade
              - 53rd Reconnaissance Battalion
              - 58th Motorised Brigade (Commander: Lt. Col Yaroslav Akimenko †)
              - 92nd Assault Brigade (Commander: Lieutenant Colonel Pavlo Fedosenko)
              - Kharkiv Border Detachment
            - 15th Army Corps
              - 10th Mountain Assault Brigade (Commander: Colonel Viacheslav Kotlyk)
              - 44th Artillery Brigade
              - 129th Heavy Mechanized Brigade
              - 130th Reconnaissance Battalion
              - 143rd Mechanized Brigade
              - 144th Mechanized Brigade
              - 158th Mechanized Brigade
              - 1st Territorial Defense Brigade (Commander: Colonel Oleg Uminskyi)
              - Chernihiv Border Detachment
            - 18th Army Corps
              - 1st Heavy Mechanized Brigade (Commander: Colonel Ihor Shpak)
              - 21st Separate Mechanized Brigade
              - 47th Artillery Brigade
              - 47th Mechanized Brigade (Commander: Lieutenant Colonel Oleksandr Sak)
              - 66th Mechanized Brigade (Commander: Oleg Degtyarev †)
              - 156th Mechanized Brigade
            - 14th Mechanised Brigade (Commander: Colonel Oleksandr Zhakun, Deputy Commander Lt. Col Vasyl Lapchuk †)
            - 15th Artillery Reconnaissance Brigade
            - 19th Missile Brigade (Commander: Colonel Fedir Yaroshevych)
            - 39th Anti-aircraft Missile Regiment
            - 47th Engineer Brigade
            - 48th Engineer Brigade
            - 55th Signal Regiment
            - 91st Support Brigade
            - 211th Pontoon Bridge Brigade
            - 703rd Support Brigade
          - Operational Command East (Commander: Lieutenant General Serhii Naiev)
            - 3rd Army Corps
              - 3rd Assault Brigade
              - 53rd Mechanised Brigade
              - 60th Mechanized Brigade
              - 63rd Mechanised Brigade (Commander: Colonel Oleksandr Marushchak)
              - 125th Heavy Mechanized Brigade
            - 9th Army Corps
              - 5th Heavy Mechanized Brigade
              - 32nd Mechanized Brigade
              - 52nd Reconnaissance Battalion
              - 55th Artillery Brigade (Commander: Colonel Roman Kachur)
              - 68th Jaeger Brigade (Commander: Colonel Yuriy Belyakov)
              - 142nd Mechanized Brigade
              - 150th Reconnaissance Strike Battalion
              - 153rd Mechanized Brigade
            - 11th Army Corps
              - 24th Mechanised Brigade (Commander: Colonel Anatoly Shevchenko)
              - 30th Mechanised Brigade (Commander: Colonel Ihor Dovhan)
              - 45th Artillery Brigade
              - 56th Motorised Brigade (Commander: Colonel Serhii Sirchenko)
              - 127th Heavy Mechanized Brigade
              - 152nd Reconnaissance Battalion
            - 54th Mechanised Brigade
            - 67th Mechanised Brigade (Commander: Andriy Stempitsky) (Note: previously the Ukrainian Volunteer Corps)
            - 74th Reconnaissance Battalion
              - 22nd Motorised Infantry Battalion
            - 121st Signal Regiment
            - 129th Reconnaissance Battalion
            - 425th Skala Assault Regiment (Major Yuriy Harkaviy was suspended as its commander in July 2026)
            - 1039th Anti-aircraft Missile Regiment
          - Operational Command South (Commander: Major General Andriy Kovalchuk, Chief of Staff: Brigadier General Mykhailo Drapatyi, Deputy commander: Brigadier General Andrii Hnatov)
            - 17th Army Corps
              - 23rd Reconnaissance Battalion
              - 65th Mechanized Brigade
              - 108th Territorial Defense Brigade
              - 110th Mechanised Brigade (Commander: Colonel Mykola Chumak, Deputy Commander: Dmitry Romaniuk †)
              - 118th Mechanized Brigade
              - 128th Mountain Assault Brigade (Commander: Colonel Dmytro Lysyuk, Deputy Commander: Lt. Col Andriy Tarasenko †)
              - 128th Heavy Mechanized Brigade
              - 241st Territorial Defense Brigade
              - 252nd Territorial Defense Battalion
              - 411th Unmanned Systems Regiment
              - 422nd Unmanned Systems Battalion
            - 19th Army Corps
              - 28th Mechanised Brigade (Colonel Vitalii Huliaiev †)
              - 40th Artillery Brigade
              - 44th Mechanized Brigade
              - 100th Mechanized Brigade
              - 117th Mechanized Brigade (Deputy Commander Major Oleksandr Egorov †)
            - 20th Army Corps
              - 17th Heavy Mechanized Brigade (Commander: Lieutenant Colonel Oleksandr Tarnavskiy)
              - 23rd Mechanized Brigade
              - 31st Mechanized Brigade
              - 33rd Mechanized Brigade
              - 141st Mechanized Brigade
              - 423rd Unmanned Systems Battalion
              - 110th Territorial Defense Brigade
              - 24th Assault Battalion
            - 7th Communication Regiment
            - 16th Support Regiment
            - 38th Anti-aircraft Missile Regiment
            - 61st Mechanized Brigade
            - 70th Support Brigade
            - 131st Reconnaissance Battalion
          - 808th Pontoon Bridge Brigade
          - 11th Army Aviation Brigade
          - 12th Army Aviation Brigade
          - 16th Army Aviation Brigade
          - 18th Army Aviation Brigade
          - 419th Unmanned Systems Battalion
          - 425th Unmanned Systems Regiment
          - 427th Unmanned Systems Regiment
          - 20th Electronic Warfare Battalion
          - 49th Assault Engineering Brigade
          - 49th Infantry Battalion
          - 92nd Support Battalion
          - 98th Infantry Battalion
          - 214th Rifle Battalion
          - 305th Electronic Warfare Regiment
          - Independent formations
            - Kakhovka operational group
            - Khortytsia operational-strategic group (Commander: Colonel General Oleksandr Syrskyi)
            - Presidential Brigade (Commander: Colonel Pavlo Hora, Deputy Commander and Chief of Staff Major Tsyb Yuri †)
            - Sheikh Mansur Battalion (Commander: Muslim Cheberloyevsky)
          - Ukrainian Anti-Aircraft Defense Rocket Forces
            - 96th Anti-aircraft Missile Brigade
            - 138th Anti-aircraft Missile Brigade
            - 160th Anti-Aircraft Missile Brigade (Commander: Lieutenant Colonel Mykola Oleshiuk, former Commander: Col Viktor Polyvany †
            - 201st Anti-aircraft Missile Brigade
            - 208th Anti-aircraft Missile Brigade
            - 11th Anti-aircraft Missile Regiment.
            - 14th Anti-aircraft Missile Regiment
            - 156th Anti-aircraft Missile Regiment
            - 223rd Anti-aircraft Missile Regiment
            - 225th Anti-aircraft Missile Regiment
            - 301st Anti-aircraft Missile Regiment
            - 302nd Anti-aircraft Missile Regiment
            - 540th Anti-aircraft Missile Regiment
          - Ukrainian Communication Forces
            - 31st Communication Regiment
            - 43rd Communication Regiment
            - 57th Communication Regiment
            - 76th Communication Regiment
            - 101st Communication Regiment
          - Ukrainian Radar Forces
            - 1st Radio Technical Brigade
            - 14th Radio Technical Brigade
            - 19th Radio Intercept Brigade
            - 138th Radio Technical Brigade
            - 164th Radio Technical Brigade
          - Independent formations
            - International Legion of Territorial Defense of Ukraine (Commander: Colonel Ruslan Miroshnichenko)
            - 1st Battalion International Legion
            - 3rd Battalion International Legion
            - Bolívar Battalion
            - Canadian-Ukrainian Brigade
            - ~~Pahonia Regiment~~ (ceased to exist in July 2023)
            - Bashkir Company
            - Black Bridge
            - Romanian Battlegroup Getica
            - Krym Battalion (Commander: Isa Akaiev)
            - Ukrainian Volunteer Army (Commander: Dmytro Yarosh, Deputy Commander Serhii Ilnytskyi †)
            - Hospitallers Medical Battalion (Commander: Yana Zinkevych)
            - ~~Norman Brigade~~ (ceased to exist in July 2024)
            - Turan Battalion
            - Misanthropic Division
            - Resistance Committee
            - Ajnad al-Kavkaz

== See also ==
- Army ranks and insignia of the Russian Federation
- Casualties of the Russo-Ukrainian War
- Combatants of the war in Donbas
- List of equipment of the Armed Forces of Ukraine
- List of equipment of the Russian Ground Forces
- List of equipment used by Russian separatist forces of the war in Donbas
- List of orders of battle
- List of Russian generals killed during the Russo-Ukrainian war (2022–present)
- List of Russo-Ukrainian War military equipment
- List of ship losses during the Russo-Ukrainian War
