= 783rd Operational Preparation Brigade (Ukraine) =

783rd Separate Operational Preparation Brigade
- Ukrainian: 783 окрема бригада оперативного обладнання території
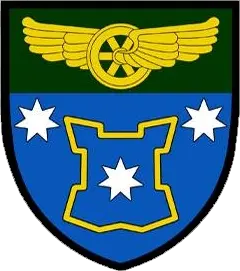
- Insignia
- Active: 2022–present
- Country: Ukraine
- Allegiance: Ukraine
- Branch: State Transport Special Service
- Type: Support Forces
- Role: Guard
- Size: Brigade
- Engagements: Russo-Ukrainian war; 2022 Russian invasion of Ukraine

Insignia
- Former Insignia

The 783rd Separate Operational Preparation Brigade (MUN T0920) is a Brigade level military unit of the State Transport Special Service of Ukraine, subordinated to the Ministry of Defense. It has seen intensive action during the Russian invasion of Ukraine.

== History ==
On 2 April 2022, a soldier of the brigade (Pelypenko Yevheni Oleksandrovych) was killed in action during the Battle of Enerhodar. On 22 July 2022, a soldier of the brigade (Volhin Serhi Leonidovych) was killed in action. On 25 September 2022, a soldier of the brigade (Franko Yevhen Viktorovych) was killed during the Battle of Horlivka, and another (Maksymov Oleksandr Viktorovych) was killed in Toretsk, the next day. On 24 October 2022, a soldier of the brigade (Pervukhin Anatoli Oleksandrovych) was killed in action. On 24 December 2022, a soldier of the brigade (Slobodyuk Vitali Petrovych) was killed in Toretsk.

On 4 February 2023, a soldier of the brigade (Kovalov Dmytro Mykhailovych) was killed in Zaporizhzhia Oblast. On 11 February 2023, a soldier of the brigade (Myhulov Andri Volodymyrovych) was killed during the Battle of Bakhmut. On 7 April 2023, a soldier of the brigade (Judin Eduard Vasylovych) was killed in action in Khromove, another (Koshyl Vitali Oleksandrovych) was killed there, the following day and a third (Huryev Taras Anatoliovych) was killed, the day later. On 16 April 2023, a soldier of the brigade (Andrichuk Oleh Anatoliovych) was killed in Khromove. On 2 May 2023, a soldier of the brigade (Pechersky Vasyl Serhiovych) was killed in action during the Battle of Chasiv Yar. On 4 May 2023, a soldier of the brigade (Bardatsky Anatoli Anatoliovych) was killed in action in Bakhmut. On 5 June 2023, two soldiers of the brigade (Knazev Vadym Mykolaiovych and Serenkov Ruslan Petrovych) were killed in Bakhmut. On 7 June 2023, a soldier of the brigade (Kudryavtsev Dmytro Serhiovych) was killed in action. On 24 August 2023, a soldier of the brigade (Zelensky Artem Anatoliovych) was killed in Ivanivske, Donetsk Oblast. On 3 November 2023, a soldier of the brigade (Zaitsev Oleksandr Volodymyrovych) was killed in Klishchiivka. On 5 December 2023, a soldier of the brigade (Konkin Viktor Ihorovych) was killed in action in Ivanivske.

On 2 February 2024, a soldier of the brigade (Lakhtadyr Viktor Arkadiovych) was killed in action near Ivanivske. On 20 February 2024, a soldier of the brigade (Yakovenko Dmytro Volodymyrovych) was killed in Bakhmut. On 25 June 2024, a soldier of the brigade (Khodas Volodymyr Oleksandrovych) was killed in Chaplyn. On 17 September 2024, a soldier of the brigade (Parfonov Oleksi Mykhailovych) was killed in action in Komyshuvakha. On 5 December 2024, a soldier of the brigade (Kulakov Yevheni Yevheniovych) was killed in Orikhiv.

On 6 April 2025, a soldier of the brigade (Matyuk Viktor Ivanovych) was killed in Novopavlika. On 24 August 2025, it was awarded a battle banner.
