= 711th Demining Brigade (Ukraine) =

711th Separate Demining Brigade
- Ukrainian: 711 окрема бригада розмінування
- Insignia
- Active: 2022–present
- Country: Ukraine
- Allegiance: Ukraine
- Branch: State Transport Special Service
- Type: Support Forces
- Role: Guard
- Size: Brigade
- Garrison/HQ: Chop
- Engagements: Russo-Ukrainian war; 2022 Russian invasion of Ukraine

The 711th Separate Demining Brigade (MUN T0950), formerly the 711th Separate Guard Brigade is a Brigade level military unit of the State Transport Special Service of Ukraine, subordinated to the Ministry of Defense. It is based in Chop and has seen intensive action during the Russian invasion of Ukraine.

== History ==
It was established in 2022, initially as a Guard Regiment under the 1st Prince Lev Brigade but was later expanded to a separate Brigade.

On 24 October 2022, a soldier of the brigade (Fedoryshyn Vasyl Vasylovych) was killed during the Battle of Vodiane whilst saving the lives of 14 other soldiers from machine gun fire. On 30 October 2022, a soldier of the brigade (Rosly Mykola Leonidovych) was killed in Vodiane. On 26 December 2022, a soldier of the brigade (Ivantsiv Yuri Lubomyrovych) was killed during the Battle of Marinka.

On 5 March 2023, a soldier of the brigade (Hrybovych Andri Ivanovych) was killed in action in Ivanivske, Donetsk Oblast. On 5 May 2023, a soldier of the brigade (Rohiv Mykola Vasylovych) was killed in combat in Ivanivske. On 7 May 2023, a soldier of the brigade (Demchenko Ruslan Petrovych) was killed in combat near Ivanivske. On 14 May 2023, a soldier of the brigade (Danysh Taras Tarasovych) was killed in combat in Ivanivske. On 16 May 2023, a soldier of the brigade (Holovlov Viktor Viktorovych) died from wounds sustained in battle five days earlier in Ivanivske. On 13 July 2023, a soldier of the brigade (Mykytchuk Vitali Stepanovych) was killed in action in Bakhmut. On 4 June 2023, a soldier of the brigade (Kava Taras Mykhailovych) was killed in Ivanivske. On 7 June 2023, a soldier of the brigade (Hohol Volodymyr Yaroslavovych) was killed in Bakhmut. On 12 June 2023, a soldier of the brigade (Tsukanov Volodymyr Volodymyrovych) was killed in Bakhmut. On 23 June 2023, a soldier of the brigade (Holub Oleksi Ivanovych) was killed in action in Ivanivske. On 25 June 2023, a soldier of the brigade (Yaniv Volodymyr Serhiovych) was killed in action. On 20 August 2023, a soldier of the brigade (Tsimmermann Serhi Ivanovych) was killed in action. On 26 August 2023, a soldier of the brigade (Kulynych Artem Vasylovych) was killed in action in Kharkiv Oblast. On 9 October 2023, a soldier of the brigade (Vorotnikov Anton Valerijovych) was killed in action in Kostiantynivka. On 11 November 2023, a soldier of the brigade (Holosny Andri Hennadiovych) was killed in combat near Klishchiivka. On 15 November 2023, a soldier of the brigade (Kaflanovych Dmytro Ivanovych) was killed in Bakhmut. On 17 December 2023, a soldier of the brigade (Halchy Volodymyr Yaroslavovych) was killed in combat in Ivanivske.

On 25 January 2024, two soldiers of the brigade (Novitsky Ivan Anatoliovych Lazoryk Mykhailo Dmytrovych) were killed in combat in Klishchiivka. On 13 February 2024, a soldier of the brigade (Trelevsky Taras Tarasovych) was killed in action during the Battle of Chasiv Yar. On 24 March 2024, a soldier of the brigade (Kobyzky Dmytro Ruslanovych) was killed in combat in Klishchiivka. On 24 March 2024, a soldier of the brigade (Kobyzky Dmytro Ruslanovych) was killed in combat in Klishchiivka. On 5 April 2024, a soldier of the brigade (Husak Hryhori Hryhorovych) was killed in action. On 14 April 2024, a soldier of the brigade (Tsynkanych Vasyl Ivanovych) was killed in action in Pushkarivka. On 26 April 2024, a soldier of the brigade (Huvan Yevhen Pavlovych) was killed in action. In July 2024, it conducted training. In December 2024, it was converted into a demining brigade after receiving training from the Spanish Army.

On 6 June 2025, a soldier of the brigade (Kolodazhny Volodymyr Ivanovych) died during the construction of fortifications in Izium. In July 2025, it ordered three mine clearing FAE PT-300 D-MINE Unmanned Ground Vehicles from Italy.

== Structure ==
- Management & Headquarters
- 1st Battalion
- 2nd Battalion
- 3rd Battalion
- 4th Battalion
- 5th Battalion
- Drone Battalion
- Commandant Platoon
