= 756th Guard Brigade (Ukraine) =

756th Separate Guard Brigade
- Ukrainian: 756 бригада охорони Державної спеціальної служби транспорту
- Insignia
- Active: 2022–present
- Country: Ukraine
- Allegiance: Ukraine
- Branch: State Transport Special Service
- Type: Support Forces
- Role: Guard
- Size: Brigade
- Engagements: Russo-Ukrainian war; 2022 Russian invasion of Ukraine

The 756th Separate Guard Brigade (MUN T0930) is a Brigade level military unit of the State Transport Special Service of Ukraine, subordinated to the Ministry of Defense. It has seen intensive action during the Russian invasion of Ukraine.

== History ==
It was established in 2022 as a regiment, being later expanded to a brigade. On 26 June 2022, a soldier of the brigade (Kobets Mykola Anatoliovych) was killed as a result of Russian missile strikes on a railway bridge in Cherkasy.

On 29 January 2023, a soldier of the brigade (Osipov Roman Mykolaiovych) was killed in action. On 1 June 2023, a soldier of the brigade (Kashechko Oleksandr Volodymyrovych) was killed during the Battle of Bakhmut. On 27 July 2023, a soldier of the brigade (Pali Andri Volodymyrovych) was killed in Klishchiivka. On 12 August 2023, a soldier of the brigade (Butkus Vadym Vadymovych) went MIA near Klishchiivka. On 18 August 2023, a soldier of the brigade (Volkov Yevhen Petrovych) was killed in Klishchiivka.

On 15 January 2024, a soldier of the brigade (Marchenko Viacheslav Ihorovych) was killed in action. On 11 February 2024, a soldier of the brigade (Bashmakov Yehor Andriovych) was killed in action. On 7 April 2024, a soldier of the brigade (Maksymenko Ihor Volodymyrovych) was killed in Ivanivske, Donetsk Oblast. On 31 May 2024, a soldier of the brigade (Ihnatenko Vadym Andrijovych) was killed in Khmelivka. On 14 November 2024, a soldier of the brigade (Fedorenko Oleksandr Serhiovych) was killed in action. On 9 December 2024, its personnel attended a meeting in Kozyatyn.
