= 762nd Guard Brigade (Ukraine) =

762nd Separate Guard Brigade
- Ukrainian: 762 бригада охорони Державної спеціальної служби транспорту
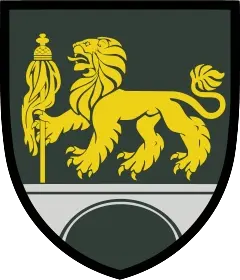
- Insignia
- Active: 2022–present
- Country: Ukraine
- Allegiance: Ukraine
- Branch: State Transport Special Service
- Type: Support Forces
- Role: Guard
- Size: Brigade
- Engagements: Russo-Ukrainian war; 2022 Russian invasion of Ukraine

The 762nd Separate Guard Brigade (MUN T0940) is a Brigade level military unit of the State Transport Special Service of Ukraine, subordinated to the Ministry of Defense. It has seen intensive action during the Russian invasion of Ukraine.

== History ==
On 29 December 2022, a soldier of the brigade (Piskun Oleksandr Mykolaiovych) was killed in action.

On 28 March 2023, a soldier of the brigade (Mikitin Bohdan Vyacheslavovych) was severely injured during the Battle of Bakhmut and succumbed to his injuries on 11 April 2023. On 19 July 2023, a soldier of the brigade (Trofimov Oleksandr Oleksandrovych) was killed in combat in Ivanivske, Donetsk Oblast. On 15 September 2023, a soldier of the brigade (Posesor Volodymyr Viktorovych) was killed in action. On 24 September 2023, a soldier of the brigade (Cherkasov Oleksi Anatoliovych) went MIA near Klishchiivka. On 31 December 2023, a soldier of the brigade (Bushuyev Andri Serhijovych) was killed in Kurakhove.

On 1 January 2024, a soldier of the brigade (Horbatyuk Oleksandr Volodymyrovych) was killed in action in Urozhaine. On 5 January 2024, a soldier of the brigade (Fedotov Oleksandr Serhiovych) was killed in action in Urozhaine. On 18 January 2024, a soldier of the brigade (Sorokin Danylo Vadymovych) was killed in action in Urozhaine. On 22 April 2024, a soldier of the brigade (Hanukov Valeri Oleksandrovych) was killed in action in Urozhaine. In May 2024, its forces in coordination with the 58th Motorized Brigade destroyed 42 Russian armored vehicles in a small area of land in Donetsk Oblast. On 28 June 2024, a soldier of the brigade (Kvas Roman Anatoliovych) was killed by Russian shelling in Zaliznychne. On 15 July 2024, two soldiers of the brigade (Musa Andri Vitaliovych and Bezrukavy Kostantyn Anatoliovych) were killed in combat in Huliaipole. On 27 December 2024, a soldier of the brigade (Yachenya Valeri Andriovych) was killed in action.
