= 710th Guard Brigade (Ukraine) =

710th Separate Guard Brigade
- Ukrainian: 710 бригада охорони Державної спеціальної служби транспорту
- Insignia
- Active: 2022–present
- Country: Ukraine
- Allegiance: Ukraine
- Branch: State Transport Special Service
- Type: Support Forces
- Role: Guard
- Size: Brigade
- Engagements: Russo-Ukrainian war; 2022 Russian invasion of Ukraine

The 710th Separate Guard Brigade (MUN T0910) is a Brigade level military unit of the State Transport Special Service of Ukraine, subordinated to the Ministry of Defense. It is based in Samar and has seen intensive action during the Russian invasion of Ukraine.

== History ==
It was established on 26 February 2022, following the start of the Russian invasion of Ukraine. On 16 April 2022, a soldier of the brigade (Breslavsky Mykola Mykolaiovych) was killed in action. In July 2022, its personnel captured an escaped fugitive from Drohobych. On 7 September 2022, a soldier of the brigade (Bozhovsky Vasyl Ivanovych) was killed in action.

On 7 February 2023, a soldier of the brigade (Holovan Dmytro Serhiovych) was killed in action in Krasnodar. On 9 February 2023, a soldier of the brigade (Klymkovych Roman Ivanovych) was killed during the Battle of Soledar. On 10 February 2023, a soldier of the brigade (Smaha Bohdan Stepanovych) was killed in action while defending "important" installations in Rivne Oblast, while another (Martsenuk Boris Vitaliovych) was killed in Bakhmut. On 14 March 2023, two soldiers of the brigade (Smolichuk Viktor Petrovych and Horety Yevhen Volodymyrovych) were killed in combat near Bohdanivka. On 17 March 2023, two soldiers of the brigade (Konopada Oleh Ihorovych and Pikulyk Taras Bohdanovych) was killed in combat near Bohdanivka and another (Yaremchuk Nazar Ihorovych) in Bakhmut. On 28 March 2023, two soldiers of the brigade (Romanchuk Yurii Volodymyrovych and Tychkivsky Ivan Lybomyrovych) were killed in action in Donetsk Oblast. On 29 March 2023, a soldier of the brigade (Bada Oleksandr Mykolaiovych) was killed in action near Snihurivka. On 4 April 2023, a soldier of the brigade (Kachynsky Andri) was killed in action. On 5 May 2023, a soldier of the brigade (Zholondyk Andri Ihorovych) was killed in combat in Khromove. On 1 April 2023, a soldier of the brigade (Hulavsky Vasyl Zinovyovych) was killed in action in Bakhmut. On 25 June 2023, a soldier of the brigade (Behen Stepan Bohdanovych) was killed in action. On 31 July 2023, a soldier of the brigade (Levchuk Vasyl Vasylovych) was killed in action near Blahodatne. On 19 August 2023, four soldiers of the brigade (Yusyp Petro Ivanovych, Shcherba Oles'-Julian Ivanovych Hudjak Ivan Mykhailovych, Yukhymets Mykola Serhiovych and Stsolny Marjan Leonidovych) were killed in action near Urozhaine. On 28 September 2023, a soldier of the brigade (Badylevych Ihor Vasylovych) was killed in combat near Urozhaine. On 1 October 2023, a soldier of the brigade (Pedchenko Oleksandr Anatoliovych) was killed in combat near Urozhaine. In early October 2023, its forces in coordination with other units destroyed a major Russian armored group in Urozhaine, killing 50 personnel and destroying 9 vehicles. On 18 October 2023, a soldier of the brigade (Chorny Serhii Vasylovych) was killed in combat near Urozhaine. On 21 November 2023, a soldier of the brigade (Molodovets Ihor Ivanovych) was killed in action. On 26 November 2023, a soldier of the brigade (Dudynsky Taras Ivanovych) was killed in combat.

On 9 January 2024, a soldier of the brigade (Demchynsky Volodymyr Yaroslavovych) was killed near Zalizne by a drone attack. On 14 January 2024, two soldiers of the brigade (Bojko Nazar Ivanovych and Zolotarchuk Volodymyr Vasylovych) was killed in action in Novomykhailivka. On 1 February 2024, two soldiers of the brigade (Hladyuk Vitali Mykhailovych and Popadynets Roman Ihorovych) were killed in Bakhmut. On 4 February 2024, a soldier of the brigade (Zilinka Lubomyr Volodymyrovych) went MIA near Ivanivske. On 6 February 2024, a soldier of the brigade (Bodnarchuk Yaroslav Volodymyrovych) was killed in action in Ivano-Frankivsk. On 7 February 2024, a soldier of the brigade (Fedorchak Roman Ruslanovych) was killed in action in Ivanivske. On 29 February 2024, a soldier of the brigade (Shtohryn Vasyl Dmytrovych) was killed in combat near Ivanivske. On 1 March 2024, a soldier of the brigade (Bohaj Vitali Vasylovych) was killed in combat near Ivanivske. On 2 March 2024, a soldier of the brigade (Linkevych Pavlo Oleksandrovych) was killed in action near Bakhmut. On 17 March 2024, a soldier of the brigade (Bondarchuk Mykola Volodymyrovych) was killed in action. In April 2024, it took part in the "Games of Courage" competition. On 11 May 2024, a soldier of the brigade (Bulei Vadym Vitalyovych) was killed in action. On 7 June 2024, a soldier of the brigade (Kravchenko Oleksandr Yuriovych) went MIA near Krasnohorivka. On 3 July 2024, a soldier of the brigade (Yurkiv Yurii Vasylovych) was killed in action near Ivanivske. On 1 October 2024, a soldier of the brigade (Karpljuk Andri Volodymyrovych) was killed in action. In October 2024, it acquired APZ-17 fuel tankers. It also ordered 240 trucks from Germany of which 189 pieces were to be delivered, 119 SKS-MNTGS400-01BP based on TGS 33.400 6×6 BB CH for UAH 7.10 million each and 70 SKS-MNTGM230-01BP based on TGM 13.320 4×4 BB CH for UAH 5.44 million each.

On 5 April 2025, a soldier of the brigade (Khaman Mykhajlo Ivanovych) was killed in action.

== Structure ==
- Management & Headquarters
- 1st Battalion
- 2nd Battalion
- 3rd Battalion
- 4th Battalion
- 10th Demining Battalion
- Drone Battalion
- Commandant Platoon
