= 425th Unmanned Systems Regiment (Ukraine) =

425th Unmanned Systems "Ochi" Regiment
- Ukrainian: 425-й окремий полк безпілотних систем «Очі»
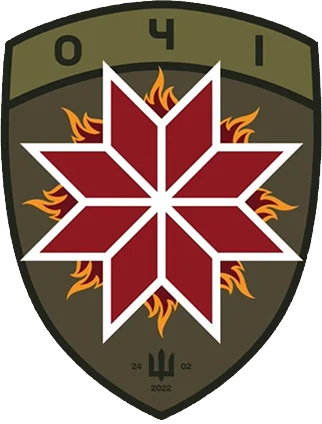
- Insignia
- Active: 2022 – present
- Country: Ukraine
- Allegiance: Ukraine
- Branch: Ukrainian Ground Forces
- Type: Unmanned Systems Forces
- Role: Aerial Reconnaissance, Drone Warfare, FPV drone strikes, Ground Drone Warfare, Cargo Transport
- Size: Regiment
- Nickname: Eye
- Engagements: Russo-Ukrainian war; 2022 Russian invasion of Ukraine

Commanders
- Current commander: Lieutenant Colonel Valeriy Gost Povarov

The 425th Unmanned Systems "Ochi" Regiment (MUN A5067) is a regiment level military unit of the Ground Forces of Ukraine, concerned with drone warfare using aerial and ground unmanned vehicles. It was established in 2022 as a company, later being expanded to a battalion and finally a regiment in December 2024.

== History ==
Its FPV drones have been very successful against Russian forces, even going so far as destroying 20 tanks in a single day. It has also received very expensive equipment with some costing as high as $4 million. In addition to Unmanned Aerial Vehicles, it has also been using Unmanned Ground Vehicles.

=== 2022 ===
In September 2022, it was fighting during the 2022 Kharkiv counteroffensive. It saw combat during the Battle of Bakhmut conducting drone flights, artillery reconnaissance and combat support for over half a year. On the third day of the deployment in Bakhmut, its positions were heavily struck by Russian forces causing damage to equipment. It worked alongside the 77th Airmobile Brigade, facing tank assaults for a week and were ultimately able to destroy the tank with artillery support. Later, it worked alongside the 3rd Assault Brigade, conducting counterattacks on Klishchiivka, protecting the flanks and destroyed several targets with artillery support, airstrikes and HIMARS. It also saw combat during the Battle of Kupiansk, conducting reconnaissance and other tasks as well as evacuation of trapped personnel.

=== 2024 ===
On 22 December 2024, it destroyed a large Russian column composed of several military-used civilian vehicles, mostly SUVs.

== Commanders ==
- Lieutenant Colonel Valeriy Gost Povarov

== Equipment ==
- DJI Mavic
- Matris-300
