= 36th Road Restoration Brigade =

36th Separate Road Restoration "Konotop" Brigade
- Ukrainian: 36-та шляхо-відновлювальна бригада
- Insignia
- Active: 1992–present
- Country: Ukraine
- Allegiance: Ukraine
- Branch: State Transport Special Service
- Type: Support Forces
- Role: Special Forces
- Size: Brigade
- Garrison/HQ: Konotop
- Engagements: Russo-Ukrainian war; War in Donbass; 2022 Russian invasion of Ukraine

The 36th Separate "Konotop" Brigade (MUN T0330) is a Brigade level military unit of the State Transport Special Service of Ukraine, subordinated to the Ministry of Defense. It is responsible for ensuring the smooth transportation during both peace and wartime and for building fortifications, demining and most importantly, the restoration and protection of critical infrastructure, specifically roads and bridges. It is based in Konotop and has seen action during the Russian invasion of Ukraine.

== History ==
It traces its origin back to 12 July 1941, when the 36th Separate Railway Brigade was established in Tbilisi, Georgia. In 1953, the 92nd Separate Track Railway Battalion became part of it and it was redeployed to Kharkiv Oblast and in 1991, to Konotop where following the Dissolution of the Soviet Union, it came under the jurisdiction of Ukraine. Its personnel took part in the liquidation of the Chernobyl disaster in 1986 and under took relief measures following the 1988 Armenian earthquake. In 2008, it performed flood relief operations in Western Ukraine. It also completed several infrastructure projects including a dam. In Konotop, it constructed many buildings and infrastructure and has constructed multi-storey residential buildings for military personnel, restored tram tracks and various infrastructure facilities.

It also saw action during the War in Donbas as the 36th Road Restoration Regiment. In July 2014, it defused 636 explosive devices, inspected over 200 km railway tracks and 110 structures on the Donetsk railway, following the Siege of Sloviansk. From 2014 to 2015, it strengthened 621 strongholds and positions, dug 17,082 meters of trenches and 1,974 dugouts, and carried out combat missions to protect and defend important infrastructure facilities. In December 2017, it started the construction of the Shyrokyi Lan training area in the Mykolaiv Oblast, building a parade ground, two mini-football fields, two volleyball courts and a training platform by December 2018. In January 2019, it was building a dormitory for the 58th Motorized Brigade in Konotop. It further improved the "Shyroky Lan" in 2020. On 28 December 2020, it was given the honorary name "Konotopsky".

Following the full-scale Russian invasion of Ukraine in February 2022, it provided material support and constructed fortifications on the frontlines in the Zaporizhzhia Oblast and Donetsk Oblast and performed combat duty at checkpoints. It successfully restored the damaged bridges in the Kyiv Oblast and rebuilt destroyed bridges in the Chernihiv, Kharkiv and Sumy Oblasts. Following the 2022 Kherson counteroffensive, it repaired transport infrastructure in Kherson Oblast and Mykolaiv Oblast including construction of bridges in Mykolaiv Oblast. By 2023, it had completed 33 infrastructure projects since the start of the invasion. It also repaired destroyed homes and other structures. On 10 May 2022, a soldier of the regiment (Karlychuk Oleksy Volodymyrovych) was killed in combat during the Siege of Mariupol. In 2024, it was expanded to a brigade. In June 2024, it started a recruitment campaign. On 30 June 2025, a soldier of the brigade was killed in action near Samarske.

== Commanders ==
- Colonel Pozovny Oleksandr Mykolayovych

== Structure ==
- Management & Headquarters
- 92nd Separate Track Battalion (T0210, Konotop)
- 337th Separate Mechanization Battalion (T0420, Konotop)
- 199th Equipment Base (T0700, Kharkiv)
- Commandant Platoon
