= State Transport Special Service =

Government agency of Ukraine

- Державна спеціальна служба транспорту

Agency overview
- Formed: 1 November 2004; 21 years ago
- Jurisdiction: Government of Ukraine
- Headquarters: Kyiv, Ukraine
- Employees: 5000
- Annual budget: ₴778 million (2019)
- Agency executive: Bondar Bohdan Volodymyrovych, Head
- Parent agency: Ministry of Defence

State Transport Special Service (Ukrainian: Державна спеціальна служба транспорту; abbrev: ДССТ, DSST) is a specialized military unit that is a part of the Ministry of Defense and was created to guarantee the reliable operation of transportation during special occasions and times of peace. The structure of the military formation was altered in compliance with revisions made to the Law of Ukraine "On the State Special Transport Service" at the end of 2017; the previous combined and independent units were restructured into brigades, regiments, and separate battalions.

== Tasks ==
The tasks of the State Special Transport Service include:

- To ensure the activity of the Ukrainian Armed Forces and other military units created in accordance with Ukrainian law, technological cover, renovation, and the installation of barriers at the locations of the country's national transportation system.
- Building new facilities for the national transportation system, repair, and extending their useful lives and capacities both during times of peace and during periods of martial law.
- Reconstruction of transportation communications impacted by emergencies, accidents, and disasters both man-made and natural.
- Protection of equipment of Ukraine's national transportation system during peacetime and at a particular timeframe.
- Fulfillment of additional duties connected to taking part in state defense and making sure Ukraine's national transportation system operates efficiently.

Additionally, decontaminating explosive materials at transportation infrastructure facilities has been given to the DSST. The service works in conjunction with the NATO, OSCE, and US European Command headquarters. Together with receiving assistance from stations of the information management system in the IMSMA's mine countermeasures actions, modern mine detectors, off-road vehicles, protection and communication tools, GPS navigators, and other tools were also used. In total, during the War in Donbas five demining groups in the Joint Forces Operation (OOC) area were in active service.

== History ==
The State Special Transport Service, which included the railway troops, was placed under the Ministry of Transport and Communications on 1 November 2004. The force was formed out of the reformed remnants of the Soviet 2nd Railway Corps. The State Transport Safety Service of Ukraine, which reports to the Ukrainian Special Transport Service, was founded on 10 September 2014, per Cabinet Resolution No.442. Draft Law No.7242, dated 27 October 2017, was approved by the Verkhovna Rada of Ukraine on 5 December 2017. As a result, it was once again under the Ministry of Defense. According to the explanatory note to the draft law, this will provide Ukraine's security and defense sector the chance to be optimized, planning will be more effective, and budget money allocated for ensuring the state's defense capability will be used in a responsible manner. Petro Poroshenko, the president of Ukraine, decreed the locations of the State Special Transport Service's structural divisions and the total number of its management bodies on 29 November 2018, via Decree No.399.

=== 2022 Russian invasion ===
The Russian invasion of Ukraine in 2022 resulted in a renewed relevance for the SSTS of the AFU. With Western support, alongside fighting with regulars and reservists, the SSTS has also fulfilled the mandates given to this branch of the Armed Forces. The 8th Training Center, based in Chernihiv, took an active role in the defense of bridges and lines of communication during fighting in that city.

== Structure ==
State Special Transport Service is classified as a special state transportation agency. Officers, warrant officers, contract service sergeants, conscripts, and civilian experts make up its staff. The overall number of the State Special Transport Service is set at the legislative level, accounting for the criteria of paragraph 22 of the first part of Article 85 of the Ukrainian Constitution, which will total 5,000 individuals, including 4,600 military personnel.

The structure of DSST is as follows:

- DSST Administration (Kyiv) work unit T0100
- 195 DSST base (Kyiv) MUN T0710
- 194th pontoon-bridge detachment (Novomoskovsk) MUN T0320
- Department of Military Training of DSST Specialists
- Dnipro Institute of Infrastructure and Transport, formerly the Dnipro National University of Rail Transport
- 8 DSST Training Center (Chernihiv) work unit T0500
- 1st combined mechanization detachment (Lviv) MUN T0110
  - 11th separate track detachment (Chervonohrad) MUN T0200
  - 72nd separate mechanization detachment (Chervonohrad) MUN T0410
  - 18th separate bridge detachment (Chop) MUN T0300
  - 220th separate mechanization unit (Chervonohrad) MUN T0600
- 26th United Mechanization Detachment (Dnipropetrovsk) MUN T0120
  - 19th separate bridge detachment (Dnipropetrovsk) MUN T0310
  - 1936th separate mechanization detachment (Kryvyi Rih) MUN T0400
  - 1935th a separate mechanization unit (Dnipropetrovsk) MUN T0610
- 36th United Mechanization Detachment (Kharkiv) MUN T0130
  - 92nd separate track detachment (Konotop) MUN T0210
  - 337th separate mechanization detachment (Konotop) MUN T0420
  - 199th equipment base (Kharkiv) MUN T0700

=== Units ===
- DSST Administration
- 1st Prince Lev Brigade (T0110, Lviv)
  - 11th Separate Track Battalion (T0200, Sheptytskyi)
  - 18th Separate Bridge Battalion (T0300, Chop)
  - 72nd Separate Mechanization Battalion (T0410, Chervonohrad)
  - 220th Separate Mechanization Battalion (T0600, Chervonohrad)
- 7th Special Purpose Brigade (T0960, Kyiv)
- 26th Dnipro Brigade (T0120, Dnipro)
  - 19th Separate Bridge Battalion (T0310, Dnipro)
  - 1935th Separate Mechanization Battalion (T0610, Dnipropetrovsk)
  - 1936th Separate Battalion (T0400, Kryvyi Rih)
- 36th Konotop Brigade (T0330, Konotop)
  - 92nd Separate Track Battalion (T0210, Konotop)
  - 337th Separate Mechanization Battalion (T0420, Konotop)
  - 199th Equipment Base (T0700, Kharkiv)
- 194th Separate Pontoon-bridge Brigade (T0320, Samar)
- 195th Base (T0710, Kyiv)
- 710th Separate Guards Brigade (T0910)
- 711th Separate Demining Brigade (T0950, Chop)
- 756th Separate Guards Brigade (T0930)
- 762nd Separate Guards Brigade (T0940, Samar)
- 783rd Separate Operational Preparation Brigade (T0920)

== Leaderships ==
- Lieutenant General Mykola Ivanovich Malkov (2004—2020)
- Major General Bondar Bohdan Volodymyrovych (since 2 March 2022)

== See also ==
- State Special Communications Service of Ukraine
