= 194th Pontoon-Bridge Brigade =

194th Separate Pontoon Bridge Brigade
- Ukrainian: 194-та понтонно-мостова бригада
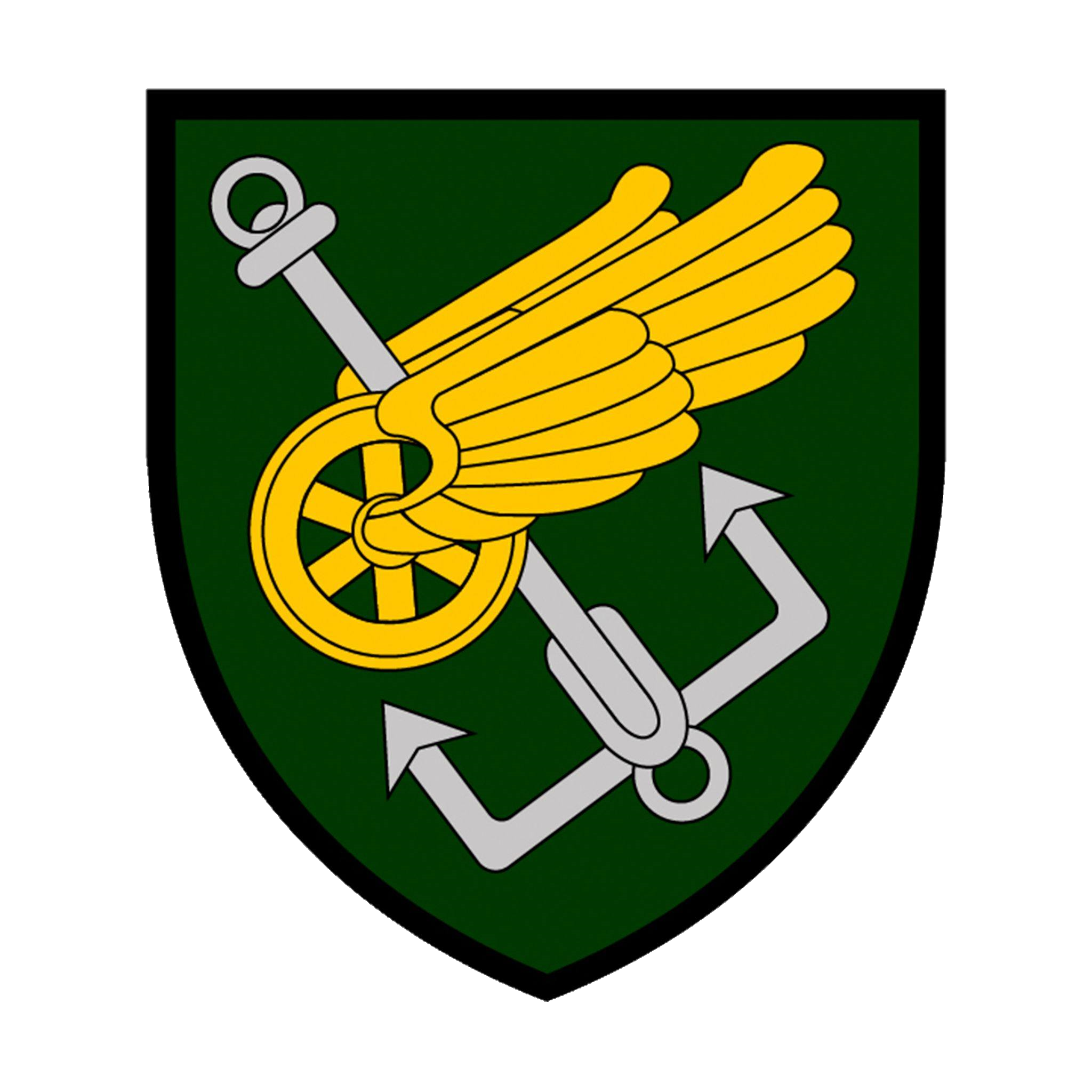
- Insignia
- Active: 1992–present
- Country: Ukraine
- Allegiance: Ukraine
- Branch: State Transport Special Service
- Type: Support Forces
- Role: Combat Engineer
- Size: Brigade
- Garrison/HQ: Samar
- Engagements: Russo-Ukrainian war; War in Donbass; 2022 Russian invasion of Ukraine

The 194th Separate Pontoon Bridge Brigade (MUN T0320) is a Brigade level military unit of the State Transport Special Service of Ukraine, subordinated to the Ministry of Defense. It is based in Samar and has seen action during both the War in Donbass and the Russian invasion of Ukraine.

== History ==
It was established as the 27th Separate Railway Bridge Battalion, on 10 February 1942 in Novospasske, Kuibyshev Oblast. In 1946, the battalion was transferred to Manchuria, following Japan's surrender in the Second World War. In peacetime, it constructed new infrastructure in Kazakhstan, Irkutsk, Kuibyshev and other regions. In 1957, it was reformed into the 113th Separate Bridge Railway Battalion. In 1958, it became a Pontoon battalion and was deployed to Bilhorod-Dnistrovskyi. In 1976, it was reorganized into the 644th Separate Pontoon Bridge Battalion. In 1980, the battalion was reorganized into the 194th Pontoon-Bridge Regiment of the 14th Guards Combined Arms Army.

On 7 October 1991, it came under the jurisdiction of Ukraine swearing allegiance in 1992. In 1999, the battalion was deployed to take part in the UN peacekeeping mission in Yugoslavia. In 2001, it was reorganized into the 194th Separate Pontoon-Bridge Railway Regiment being transferred to the State Transport Special Service in 2004 as a detachment. On 1 October 2001, a military orchestra was established by the regiment which tours Ukraine and many countries. It constructed a new bridge across Ingulets, restored bridges in Novomoskovsk and constructed the Dnipropetrovsk subway and the tram line connecting Dnipro to Levoberezhny. In September 2011, a chapel was consecrated at its headquarters.

Since 2014, it has been partaking in the War in Donbas performing protection and defense tasks. In August 2015, it established a furniture workshop. In 2018, it again became the 194th Pontoon-Bridge Regiment. In February 2020, it started the improvement construction at the Shyrokyi Lan training area in the Mykolaiv Oblast. In August 2020, it constructed two new barracks for the personnel of the 93rd Mechanized Brigade "Kholodny Yar" in Kholodny Yar. In May 2021, it was working for the construction of Vostok naval base in Berdyansk. On 6 December 2021, it was awarded a battle banner.

Following Russian invasion of Ukraine, it saw action. On 25 September 2022, a soldier of the regiment (Pron Yuri Mykolayovych) was killed during the Battle of Horlivka. In 2023, its orchestra participated in the International Festivals of Military Orchestras in Europe and the World taking place in France, Italy and Switzerland. In late 2023, it was expanded to a Brigade. On 29 May 2024, three soldiers of the brigade (Yermolayev Vadym Leonidovych, Chernikov Kostantyn Kostantynovych and Borhun Taras Serhijovych) were killed in Donetsk Oblast. On 27 October 2024, its FPV pilots destroyed Russian equipment with drone strikes near Vuhledar. On 31 October 2024, a soldier of the brigade (Naumchuk Oleksandr Jurijovych) was killed in action in Zaporizhzhia Oblast.

== Commanders ==
- Savchuk Mykola Timofiyovych (?-2017)
- Colonel Zaremba Gennady Valeriyovych (2017-)
