= 7th Special Purpose Brigade =

7th Separate Special Purpose Brigade
- Ukrainian: 7-ї окремої бригади спеціальних операцій
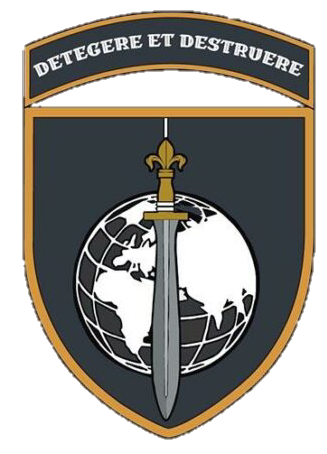
- Insignia
- Active: 2024–present
- Country: Ukraine
- Allegiance: Ukraine
- Branch: State Transport Special Service
- Type: Support Forces
- Role: Special Forces
- Size: Brigade
- Garrison/HQ: Kyiv
- Engagements: Russo-Ukrainian war; 2022 Russian invasion of Ukraine

Commanders
- Current commander: Vladimir Paraschuk

The 7th Separate Special Purpose Brigade (MUN T0960) is a Brigade level military unit of the State Transport Special Service of Ukraine, subordinated to the Ministry of Defense. It is responsible for assault operations and was established in 2024 on the basis of several assault companies. It is based in Kyiv and has seen action during the Russian invasion of Ukraine.

== History ==
It was established in 2024 by the consolidation of separate assault company of several brigades of the State Transport Special Service, which previously took part in the Battle of Bakhmut. In February 2024, it was operating on the frontlines and was requesting assistance. In January 2025, it was reported that the brigade had acquired vehicles through the "Defense Procurement Agency". On 7 June 2025, Kyiv administration handed over 25 trucks to the brigade as well as financial assistance of over UAH 50 Million.

== Equipment ==
- Isuzu D-Max

== Commanders ==
- Vladimir Paraschuk
