= Angels Detachment (Ukraine) =

- Окремий загін спеціального призначення “Ангели” військово-морських сил
- Unit Insignia
- Country: Ukraine
- Branch: Ukrainian Navy
- Type: Special operations
- Role: Evacuation
- Part of: Armed Forces of Ukraine
- Engagements: Russo-Ukrainian War: War in Donbas; Russian invasion of Ukraine

The Angels Detachment is a special forces unit of the Ukrainian Navy, tasked with the evacuation and rescue of trapped civilians and military personnel from behind the frontlines. It was established in 2022, following the Russian invasion of Ukraine and has rescued dozens of civilians and military personnel.

== History ==
It was established in 2022, following the Russian invasion of Ukraine by the commander of the Ukrainian Navy, Oleksiy Neizhpapa to rescue trapped personnel and civilians from behind the frontlines, most operations of the unit and details of almost all operations are kept secret. In December 2022, it evacuated two Ukrainian marines from occupied territory. In February 2023, it evacuated a trapped marine from Mariupol. In September 2023, it rescued two Ukrainian paratroopers who had been hiding behind the enemy lines for over one and a half years. By September 2023, it had evacuated 63 people. On 4 July 2024, it evacuated a trapped Ukrainian Marine from Russian occupied territory, the 69th person rescued by the unit. In September 2024, it evacuated four members of the family of a Ukrainian Navy officer trapped in Crimea and persecuted by the Russian FSB, in a covert operation. From February to April 2025, it evacuated six people from occupied territories. In June 2025, it was reported that the unit had evacuated a civilian from Kherson Oblast, who had been captured by Russian Forces after being accused of collaboration with the AFU. In August 2025, it evacuated a wounded serviceman from occupied territory.

== Equipment ==
- DJI Mavic
