= Komyshuvakha =

Komyshuvakha (Ukrainian: Комишуваха) may refer to the following Ukrainian localities:

- Komyshuvakha, Donetsk Raion, Donetsk Oblast, village in Donetsk Raion
- Komyshuvakha, Kramatorsk Raion, Donetsk Oblast, an urban-type settlement in Kramatorsk Raion
- Komyshuvakha, Volnovakha Raion, Donetsk Oblast, rural settlement in Volnovakha Raion
- Komyshuvakha, Luhansk Raion, Luhansk Oblast, rural settlement in Luhansk Raion
- Komyshuvakha, Sievierodonetsk Raion, Luhansk Oblast, an urban-type settlement in Luhansk Oblast
- Komyshuvakha, Zaporizhzhia Oblast, an urban-type settlement in Zaporizhzhia Oblast
