= 26th Road Restoration Brigade =

26th Separate Road Restoration "Dnipro" Brigade
- Ukrainian: 26 окрема Дніпровська бригада
- Insignia
- Active: 2004–present
- Country: Ukraine
- Allegiance: Ukraine
- Branch: State Transport Special Service
- Type: Support Forces
- Role: Special Forces
- Size: Brigade
- Garrison/HQ: Dnipro
- Engagements: Russo-Ukrainian war; 2022 Russian invasion of Ukraine

The 26th Separate "Dnipro" Brigade (MUN T0120) is a Brigade level military unit of the State Transport Special Service of Ukraine, subordinated to the Ministry of Defense. It is responsible for ensuring the smooth transportation during both peace and wartime and for building fortifications, demining and most importantly, the restoration and protection of critical infrastructure, specifically roads and bridges. It is based in Dnipro and has seen action during the Russian invasion of Ukraine.

== History ==
It was established in 2004 along with the establishment of the State Transport Special Service. In 2012, it took part in the "Perspektyva-2012" exercise, constructing a railway pontoon bridge 500 meters long. Following the start of the War in Donbass, it saw action. In October 2017, it constructed the Tomashivskyi bridge crossing over the Siverskyi Donets between Novodruzhesk and Rubizhne, in June 2018, it constructed a bridge over the Luhan river between Popasna and Troitske, and in November 2018, it built an overpass over the railway line on the Pokrovsk-Bakhmut-Mykhailivka highway, previously destroyed by separatist militants. In January–February 2019, it completed the construction of a military dormitory in Kaidaki for the Air Command East. In July 2019, it constructed a military camp at the 239th Combined Arms training ground. In February 2020, it constructed a modular military camp near the frontlines in Donbas, then another such camp in Zaporizhzhia Oblast in September and a modular field camp "Novooleksiivka" in December in Kherson Oblast. On 28 December 2020, it was awarded the honorary name "Dniprovska". In December 2021, it received a battle banner.

Since the beginning of the full-scale Russian invasion of Ukraine, it has seen heavy action. In February 2022, its forces were deployed to protect important military and civilian infrastructure facilities and strategically important bridges in the Dnipropetrovsk Oblast. Its sapper units carried out extensive mining, barricading, sabotage, destruction and restoration of bridges and dams and demining. It has constructed fortification positions, barriers, dugouts, trenches, communication lines, anti-tank ditches, engineering and mine barriers, bridges and pontoon crossings in the Kharkiv, Donetsk, Kherson and Mykolaiv Oblasts. It also helped to construct bomb shelters in Kherson and built aircraft hangars. It also helped in disaster relief following the destruction of Nova Kharkovka Dam. On 23 January 2023, a soldier of the 1935th Separate Mechanization Battalion (Paladi Oleksandr) of the brigade was killed in combat during the Battle of Bakhmut. From 12 to 20 January 2024, it cleared 106.6 hectares and demined 706 hectares of land, neutralizing 97 explosive devices. In April 2024, it started a recruitment campaign. On 31 May 2024, a soldier of the brigade (Mukoyida Volodymyr Viktorovych) was killed in Zaporizhzhia Oblast. On 11 June 2024, two soldiers of the brigade (Lashko Maksym Andryovych and Hetmanets Serhii Mykolayovych) were killed in combat in Stepnohirsk. On 13 September 2024, a soldier of the brigade (Khaustov Andrey Vasylovych) was killed in combat. On 23 September 2024, a soldier of the 1936th Separate Mechanization Battalion (Brodovsky Vitaly Anatolyovych) of the brigade was killed by a drone strike in Novopavlivka.

== Structure ==
- Management & Headquarters
- 19th Separate Bridge Battalion (T0310, Dnipro)
- 1935th Separate Mechanization Battalion (T0610, Dnipropetrovsk)
- 1936th Separate Battalion (T0400, Kryvyi Rih)
- Commandant Platoon
