= 92nd Support Battalion (Ukraine) =

- 92-й окремий батальйон підтримки
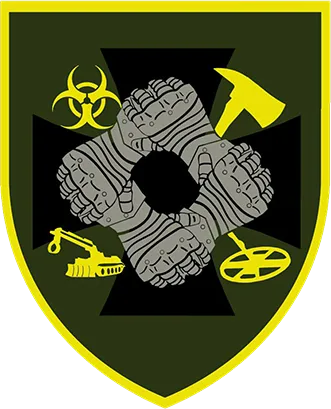
- Founded: 2024
- Country: Ukraine
- Branch: Ukrainian Ground Forces
- Type: Battalion
- Role: Engineering
- Size: ~200
- Part of: Support Forces Command
- Engagements: Russo-Ukrainian War; Russian invasion of Ukraine

The 92nd Support Battalion (MUN A4934) is a battalion level military unit of the Ukrainian Support Forces, part of the Armed Forces of Ukraine. It has seen combat during the Russian invasion of Ukraine being involved in engineering, demining and CBRN warfare tasks.

== History ==
It saw combat during the Russian invasion of Ukraine. On May 25, 2024, a soldier of the battalion (Igor Rutkovsky Ivanovich) was killed in combat in Donetsk Oblast. In February 2024, it started a fundraiser campaign for a locker mobile workshop with half the finding completed by May and fully in July 2024 and the vehicle was transferred to the battalion.

== Structure ==
- Management and Headquarters
- Engineering Department
- Support Department
- CBRN Defense Department
- Commandant Platoon
