= 1st Road Restoration Brigade =

1st Separate Road Restoration "Prince Lev" Brigade
- Ukrainian: 1 окрема бригада імені князя Лева Держспецтрансслужби
- Insignia
- Active: ≤2013–present
- Country: Ukraine
- Allegiance: Ukraine
- Branch: State Transport Special Service
- Type: Support Forces
- Role: Military logistics
- Size: Brigade
- Garrison/HQ: Lviv
- Engagements: Russo-Ukrainian war; 2022 Russian invasion of Ukraine

The 1st Separate Road Restoration "Prince Lev" Brigade (MUN T0110) is a Brigade level military unit of the State Transport Special Service of Ukraine, subordinated to the Ministry of Defense. It is responsible for ensuring the smooth transportation during both peace and wartime and for building fortifications, demining and most importantly, the restoration and protection of critical infrastructure, specifically roads and bridges. It is based in Lviv and has seen action during the Russian invasion of Ukraine.

== History ==
It is known to have existed since at least 2013. In 2018, it became part of the then newly established State Transport Special Service. In 2020, there were talks about the brigade getting the honorary name "Heorhiy Kirpa". On 23 August 2021, it was given the honorary name "Prince Lev". On 13 December 2021, a chapel was consecrated at its headquarters.

Following the Russian invasion of Ukraine, it saw action. After the withdrawal of Russian forces during the Northern Ukraine campaign, a joint group of the brigade arrived in the Kyiv Oblast and started the construction and restoration work. It restored a bridge in Ivankiv Raion which was destroyed by Russian forces at the central span. It also worked to restore a bridge in Vyshgorod Raion which was partially blown up by Russian forces who made two attempts at destroying it. In August 2023, it got third place in the "Defender of Ukraine Cup - 2023" shooting competition. On 30 November 2023, a feast day and divine liturgy were performed at its headquarters. In April 2024, it was deployed and engaged in combat with Russian forces in Zaporizhzhia Oblast. In July 2025, it started a recruitment campaign. Also, in July 2025, UAH 396,000 were raised for the brigade. It also helped the Central Hospital in Sheptytskyi for the transportation of hospital beds and equipment.

== Commanders ==
- Colonel Andriy Korotchenko

== Structure ==
Its structure includes:

- Management & Headquarters
- 11th Separate Track Battalion (T0200, Sheptytskyi)
- 18th Separate Bridge Battalion (T0300, Chop)
- 72nd Separate Mechanization Battalion (T0410, Chervonohrad)
- 220th Separate Mechanization Battalion (T0600, Chervonohrad)
- Commandant Platoon
