= Klishchiivka =

Village in Donetsk Oblast, Ukraine

Klishchiivka Кліщіївка
- Village
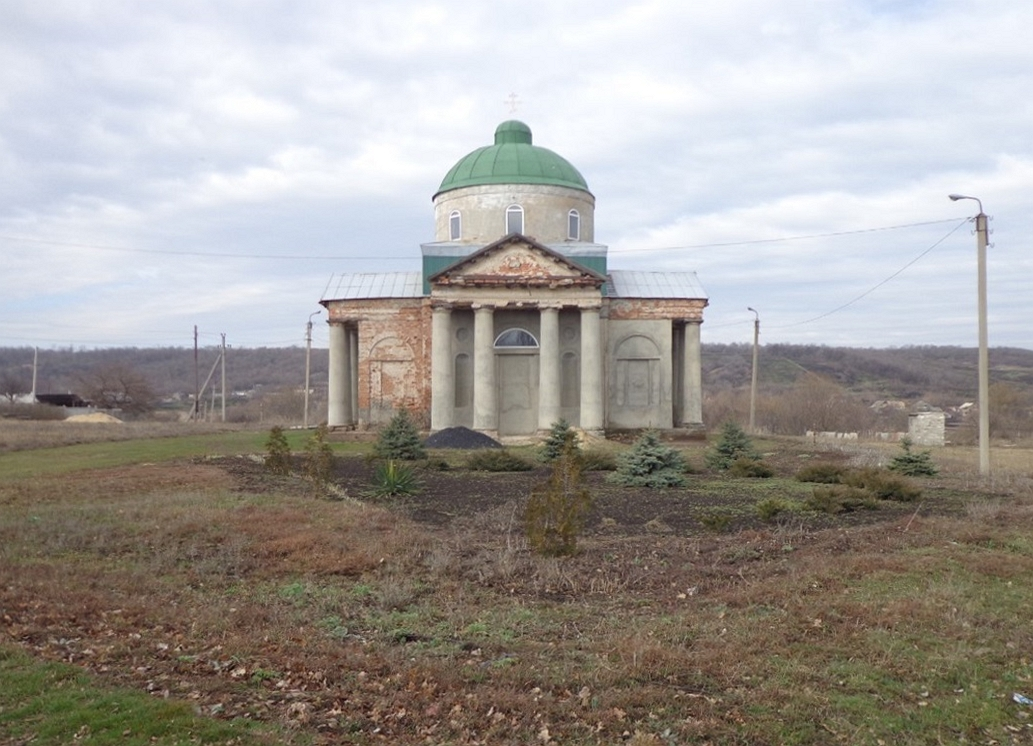
- Church of the Intercession, September 2021
- Interactive map of Klishchiivka
- Location of Klishchiivka in Donetsk Oblast Klishchiivka (Ukraine)
- Coordinates: 48.528056°N 37.958333°E
- Country: Ukraine
- Oblast: Donetsk Oblast
- Raion: Bakhmut Raion
- Hromada: Bakhmut urban hromada
- Status: 1945

Area
  - Total: 2.746 km^{2} (1.060 sq mi)
- Elevation: 153 m (502 ft)

Population (2001 census)
  - Total: 512
  - Density: 186/km^{2} (483/sq mi)
- Time zone: UTC+2 (EET)
  - Summer (DST): UTC+3 (EEST)
- Postal code: 84557
- Area code: +380 6274
- KATOTTH: UA14040070030010923

Klishchiivka, (Note: Ukrainian: Кліщіївка, IPA: [kl⁽ʲ⁾iˈʃtʃijiu̯kɐ]; Russian: Клещиевка, romanized: Kleshchiyevka, or Клещеевка, Kleshcheyevka.) known as Karlivka until 1945, is an abandoned village in Bakhmut Raion, Donetsk Oblast, eastern Ukraine. It is located about 57.61 kilometres (35.80 mi) north by east (NbE) of the centre of Donetsk and about 7.91 kilometres (4.92 mi) south-southwest (SSW) of Bakhmut, it also belongs to Bakhmut urban hromada. It has been a frontline village since the beginning of the battle of Bakhmut during the Russo-Ukraine War. By 2024, the village's population had fled, and virtually every building had been destroyed.

== History ==
In 1841, the village's Church of the Intercession was built. The village was previously named Karlivka (Ukrainian: Карлівка) until it received its current name on 15 August 1945.

=== Russo-Ukrainian War ===
==== War in Donbas ====
On 29 June 2015, during the War in Donbas (2014–2022), Dmytro Borysovych Ponomarenko, a senior soldier of the "Chernihiv-1" battalion, was fatally wounded at a checkpoint near the village.

==== Russian invasion of Ukraine ====
Fighting over the village started on 29 November 2022 as part of the battle of Bakhmut of the Russian invasion of Ukraine. The settlement was captured by Russian forces on 19 January 2023. Following counterattacks around Bakhmut, battles for the village resumed as Ukrainian forces reentered it on 23 July 2023. At the end of August, 45th Separate Artillery Brigade destroyed two Russian infantry fighting vehicles and a tank near the bridge crossing trying to advance in Klishchiivka.

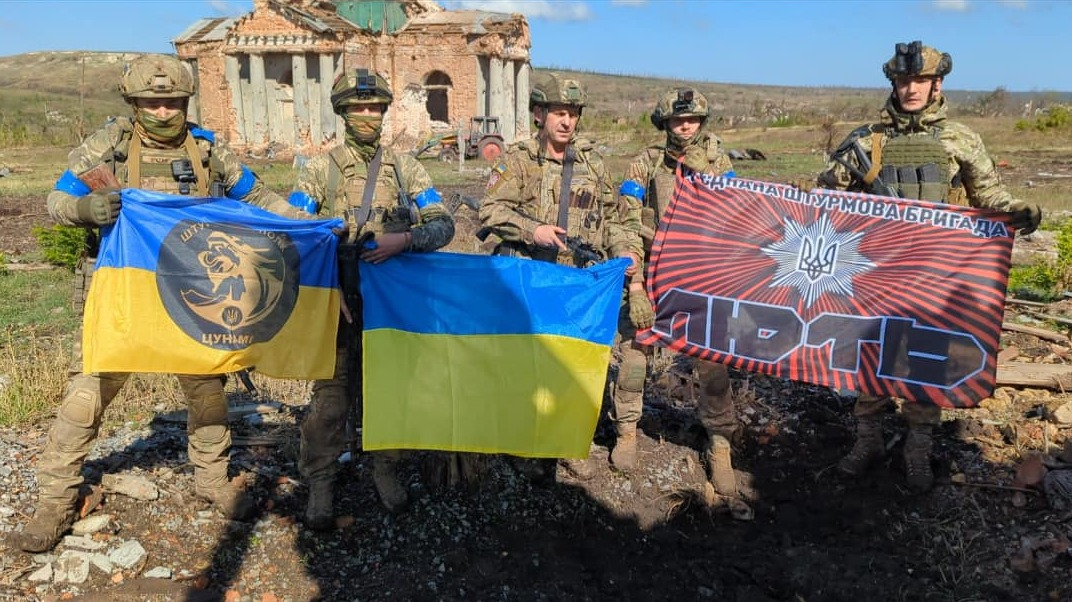
Fighters of the Lyut Brigade in the village in September 2023.

On 5 September the fighters of the Tsunami Regiment of the Lyut Brigade attacked Russian positions in the center of the village. Two days later, the 3rd Assault Brigade advanced through the forest north-west of the village establishing fire control over the passage near the destroyed bridge by cutting out the Russian supply route from Bakhmut. Russian troops were able to hold only the north-eastern outskirts of the village, about 400 meters from the railway tracks. On 17 September, it was announced that troops of the 80th Air Assault Brigade, 5th Assault Brigade, 95th Air Assault Brigade, and the Lyut Brigade participated in the liberation of the settlement.

On 21 May 2024, the Institute for the Study of War said that despite Russian claims of fully recapturing the settlement, it had "not observed visual evidence indicating that Russian forces seized northern and western Klishchiivka". On 22 May, the Russian defense ministry claimed: "Units of the Southern grouping of troops liberated the village of Klishchiivka". The ISW confirmed the capture on 17 June.

2024 satellite imagery shows the entire village being razed to the ground, with not a single structure left standing. The entire population has been evacuated.

== Demographics ==
The settlement had 512 inhabitants in 2001. The native language distribution according to the 2001 Ukrainian Census was: 84.96% Ukrainian, 14.65% Russian, and 0.39% other.
