= Ivanivske, Donetsk Oblast =

Ivanivske Іванівське
- Village
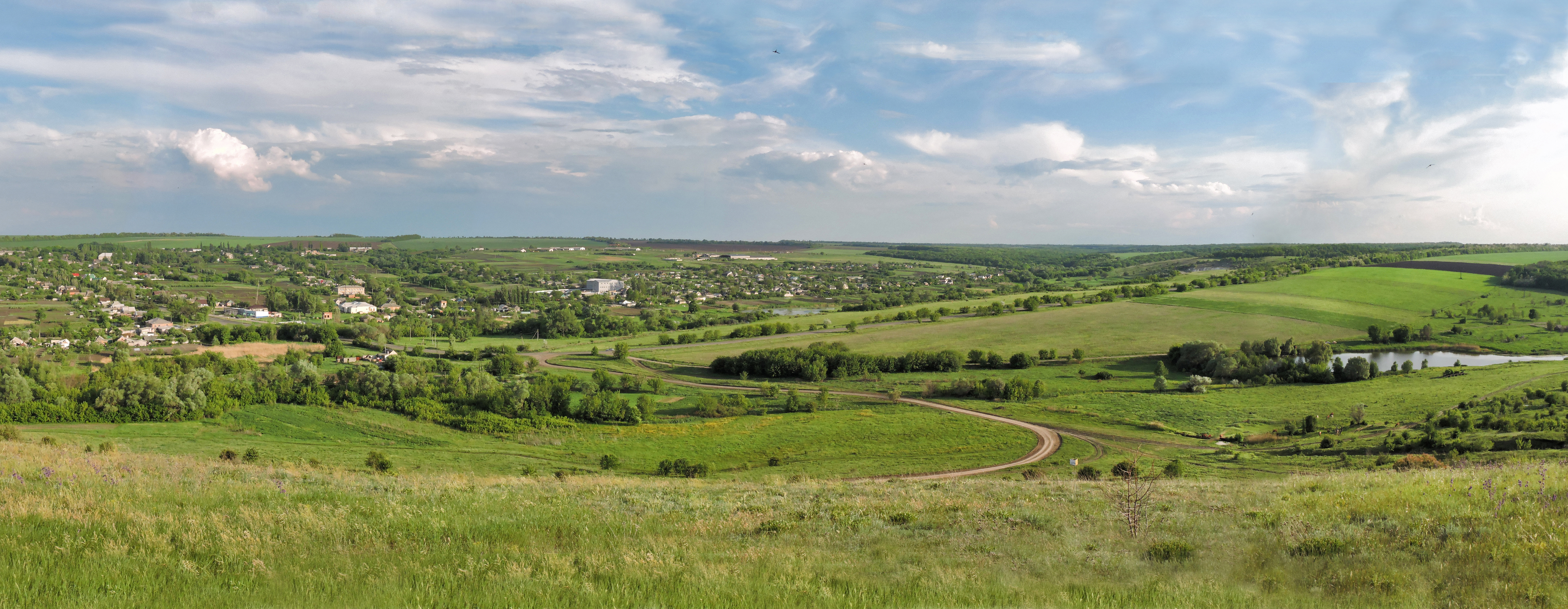
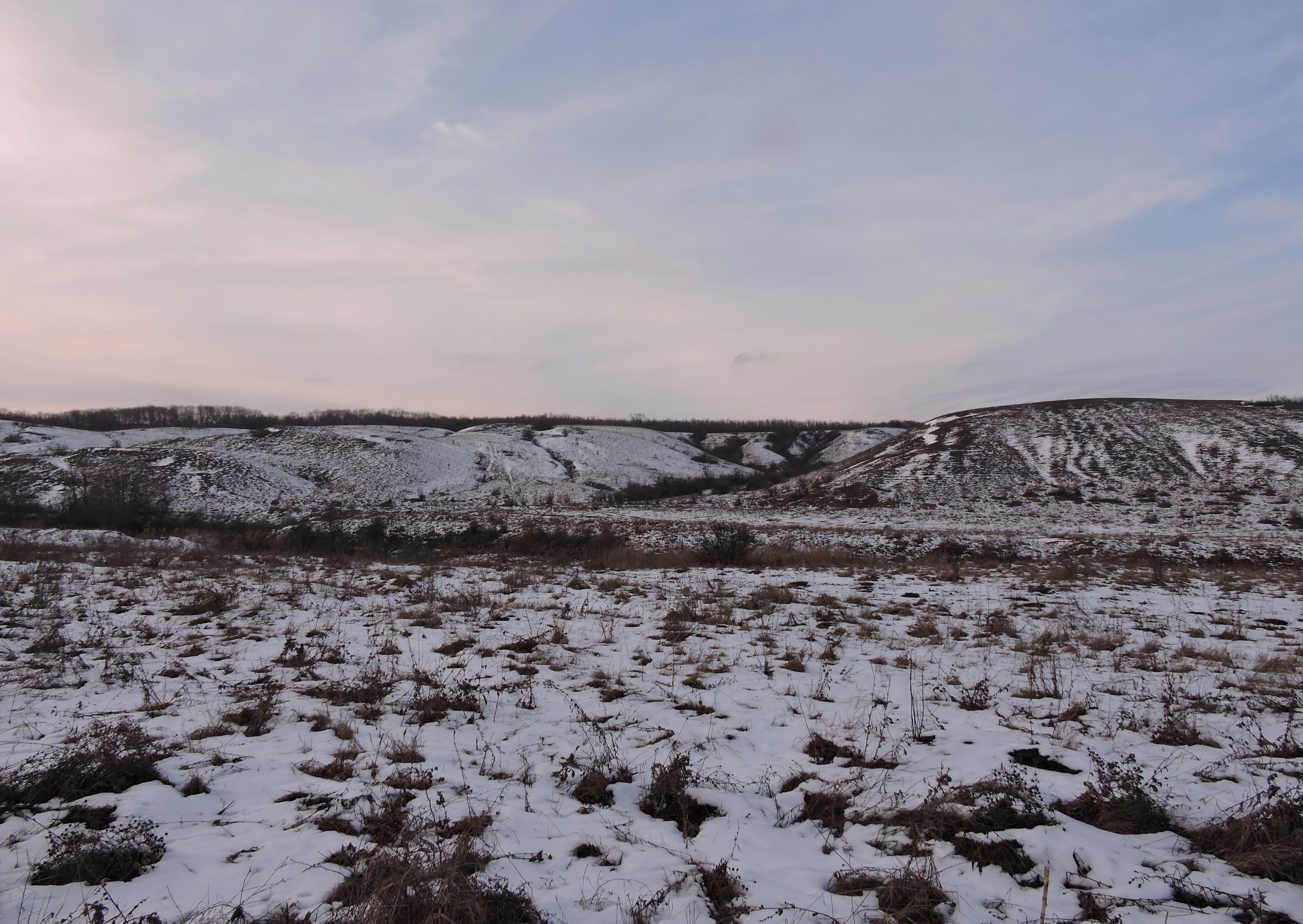

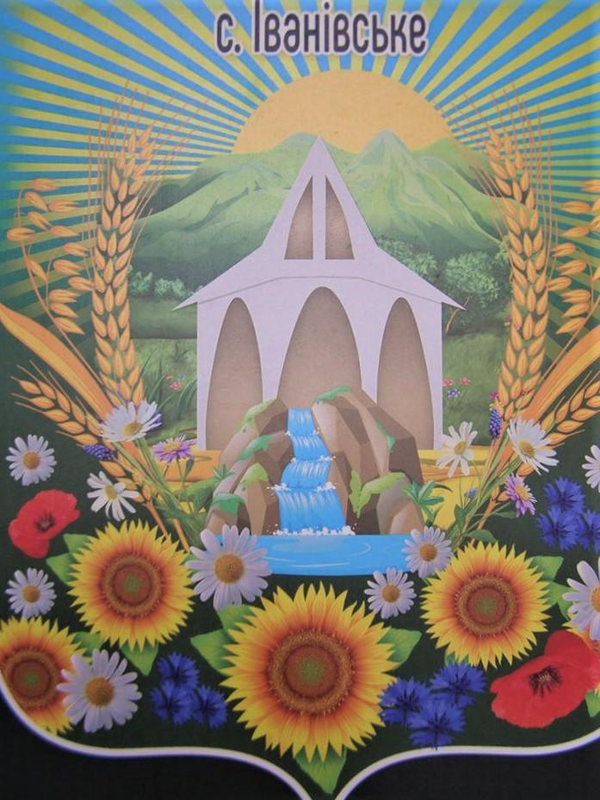
- Coat of arms
- Interactive map of Ivanivske
- Location within Donetsk Oblast Location within Ukraine
- Coordinates: 48°34′20″N 37°55′1″E
- Country: Ukraine
- Oblast: Donetsk Oblast
- Raion: Bakhmut Raion
- Hromada: Bakhmut urban hromada

Population (2001 census)
  - Total: 1,732

Ivanivske (Ukrainian: Іванівське, IPA: [iˈwɑn⁽ʲ⁾iu̯sʲke]), known as Krasne (Ukrainian: Красне) before 2016, is a village (selo) in eastern Ukraine, located in Bakhmut Raion, Donetsk Oblast. It is located 6 kilometres (3.7 mi) west of Bakhmut.

== History ==
Ivanivske was founded in the 18th century under the Russian Empire as a dacha of Bakhmut by Protopope Ivan Lukyanov. The protopope was known for his spiritual leadership, and many Cossacks came to his farm to work for the sake of spiritual salvation.

In 1776, the lands of the farm were given to Lieutenant Colonel Ivan Vasylyovych Shabelsky, who founded the settlement of Ivanivka on his new possessions. The village continued to grow, and by 1859, it had 667 residents, 87 farmsteads, an Orthodox church, a factory, and three fairs a year. By 1886, the population had grown to 767, with 135 farmsteads, an Orthodox church, a bench, and two fairs a year. In 1908, the village had 1,473 residents.

According to records, as a result of the Holodomor, 52 residents of Ivanivske died. The village's history is also intertwined with the burial mounds of the Bronze Age, which are located near the village.

=== Russo-Ukrainian War ===
==== Russian invasion of Ukraine ====
On 7 February 2023, during the Russian invasion phase of the Russo-Ukrainian War, fighting began near Ivanivske. It was on the frontline of the Battle of Bakhmut, during which Wagner Group mercenaries briefly entered it.

On 23 February 2024, Russian forces began serious operations to capture Ivanivske. Exactly a month later on 23 March, the Russian Ministry of Defense claimed it had seized the village.

On 2 April 2024 Ukrainian forces claimed to have blown up a bridge in Ivanivske that the Russians were using for logistics, using the ground kamikaze drone Ratel S.

The Institute for the Study of War estimated on 11 April that Russian troops had likely seized all of the settlement. However, DeepStateMap.Live contested this by reporting on 13 April that Ukrainian forces still held a presence in Ivanivske. This was further corroborated by geolocated footage posted on 15 April showing Russian forces striking Ukrainian positions in the westernmost part of the settlement. However, by May 13 the ISW was compelled to acknowledge that Russian units had advanced westwards from Ivanivkse down the T-0504 Highway towards Chasiv Yar. It is unknown under what basis they believe Ivanivske to still be contested, as the Russians have begun to use the town as a forward base for the Battle of Chasiv Yar, and the supposed "hold" that Ukraine has had over the town over the previous two months seems tenuous at best. Ukrainian sources confirmed the capture of the town on 11 June 2024.

== Demographics ==
According to the 2001 Ukrainian census, the village had a population of 1,732, of whom 62.7% spoke Ukrainian, 36.66% spoke Russian, and 0.64% spoke other languages.
