= Structure of the Armed Forces of Ukraine =

The structure of the Armed Forces of Ukraine is multifaceted.

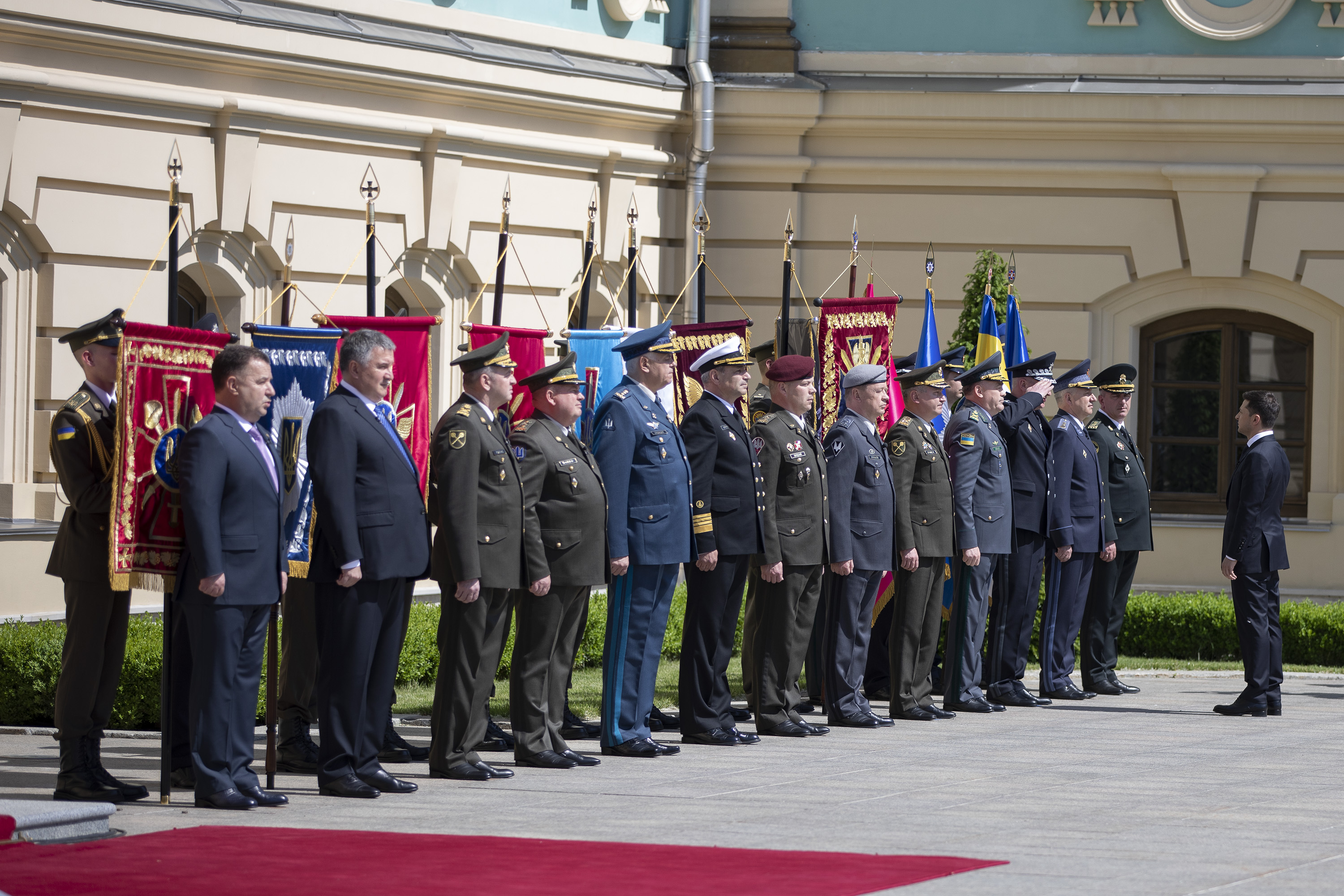
President Volodymyr Zelenskyy with the senior leadership of the Ukrainian military in May 2019

Following the Russian aggression, Ukraine has adopted a new military doctrine (third edition) which made the Russian Federation its main opponent and announced Ukraine's intentions for closer relations with NATO armed services, most especially if it joins the organization in the future.

== Organisation ==
=== Hierarchy ===
As of 2026, the hierarchy is as follows:

- Headquarters of the Supreme Commander-in-Chief
  - Commander-in-Chief of the Armed Forces of Ukraine
    - General Staff of the Armed Forces of Ukraine
      - 4 Operational Commands: North, East, South and West
        - 18 Corps (корпуси, korpusy; each corps includes 5 to 7 brigades, for a total of 60,000–80,000 troops)
          - Brigades (бригади, bryhady)
            - Battalions (батальйони, bataljony)
              - Companies, platoons and squads (роти, взводи та відділення, roty, vzvody ta viddilennja).

=== Corps-based system ===
The old brigade-based system until 2025, run by temporary Operational-Strategic Groups (OSUVs) and Operational-Tactical Groups (OTUs)

In February 2025, Ukraine had more than 100 brigades, while five corps had been preliminarily established. From early 2025 until October 2025, the Armed Forces of Ukraine and National Guard of Ukraine switched from a command structure based on brigades (бригади, bryhady) to one based on 18 corps (корпуси, korpusy; 2 of which are National Guard corps). The Operational-Strategic Groups (OSUVs) and Operational-Tactical Groups (OTUs), established ad hoc in 2014, were dissolved in late 2025.

Every corps is composed of five to seven brigades and 60,000–80,000 troops, reporting to one of four regional commands: North, East, South and West. The aim was to align Ukraine with NATO standards, thereby internationally enable joint planning and interoperability, while nationally improve accountability, coordination, and operational efficiency across various fronts after years of organisational improvisation in temporary war-time groupings. Implementation faced several hurdles, including shortages in trained senior officers, logistical bottlenecks, and limited staff experience. Corps headquarters soon took on the role as centres for recruitment, training and deployment, which centralised responsibility, but also strained the resources of the state to provide enough equipment, instructors and infrastructure at an unprecedented scale. Successful implementation was considered a decisive factor for Ukraine's ability to maintain its combat effectiveness in the long term.

As of 2026, there are 18 corps:

- Ukrainian Ground Forces: 13 corps: the 3rd, 9th, 10th, 11th, 12th, 14th, 15th, 16th, 17th, 18th, 19th, 20th, and 21st Army Corps
- Ukrainian Air Assault Forces: 2 corps: the 7th Rapid Response Corps, and 8th Air Assault Corps
- Ukrainian Marine Corps: 1 corps: the 30th Marine Corps
- National Guard of Ukraine: 2 corps: the 1st Azov Corps, and 2nd Khartiia Corps

The corps are directed by the 4 Operational Commands:

- Operational Command East, the largest, is responsible for the 9th, 11th, 19th and 20th Army Corps, plus 7th Rapid Response Corps (Air Assault Forces), and 1st Azov Corps (National Guard).
- Operational Command North leads the 3rd, 10th, 12th and 16th Army Corps, plus the 2nd Khartiia Corps (National Guard).
- Operational Command South leads the 17th and 21st Army Corps, plus the 8th Air Assault Corps, and the 30th Marine Corps.
- Operational Command West, the smallest, is responsible for the 14th, 15th and 18th Army Corps.

=== Branches ===
The 2021 law 'On the Foundations of National Resistance' (Закон «Про основи національного спротиву», Section IX, Article 2. – 6) established the following structure of the Ukrainian Armed Forces:

- the General Staff of the Ukrainian Armed Forces (Генеральний штаб Збройних Сил України);
- the Joint Forces Command of the Armed Forces of Ukraine (Командування об’єднаних сил Збройних Сил України);
- three UAF services, namely:
  - the Ground Forces (Сухопутні війська);
  - Air Force (Повітряні Сили).
  - Navy (Військово-Морські Сили),
- all three of which had five separate branches (окремі роди сил Збройних Сил України):
  - the Special Operations Forces Command (Командування Сил спеціальних операцій);
  - the Territorial Defense Command (Командування територіальної оборони);
  - the Logistical Forces Command (Командування Сил логістики);
  - the Support Forces Command (Командування Сил підтримки);
  - the Medical Forces Command (Командування Медичних сил).

In addition there has been two separate troop arms (окремі роди військ Збройних Сил України) – the Air Landing Assault Troops Command (Командування Десантно-штурмових військ) and the Communications and Cybersecurity Command (Командування Військ зв'язку та кібербезпеки).

There are also organs of military command and control, formations and units, which are separate from the services, branches and arms (органи військового управління, з’єднання, військові частини, вищі військові навчальні заклади, військові навчальні підрозділи закладів вищої освіти, установи та організації, що не належать до видів та окремих родів військ (сил) Збройних Сил України.)

== Command structure ==
=== Supreme Commander-in-Chief of the Armed Forces ===
The President of Ukraine holds the title of Supreme Commander-in-Chief of the Armed Forces (Ukrainian: Верховний Головнокомандувач Збройних Сил України). The holder of the office presides over several councils, which direct the security policies of the state:

==== Council for National Security and Defence of Ukraine ====
The Council for National Security and Defence of Ukraine (CNSDU, Рада національної безпеки і оборони України) is the highest national organ for the management of Ukraine's national security. It is headed by the President as its chairman (Голова Ради національної безпеки і оборони України – Верховний Головнокомандувач Збройних сил України) and includes:

- the Chairman of the Verkhovna Rada,
- the Prime Minister and other members of the Council of Ministers,
- the Commander-in-Chief of the Armed Forces,
- the Chief of the Foreign Intelligence Service,
- the Chief of the National Police, and other high-ranking officials.

The council has its Apparatus (or Secretariat, Апарат Ради національної безпеки і оборони України).

===== Military Cabinet at the Council for National Security and Defence of Ukraine =====
The Military Cabinet at the Council for National Security and Defence of Ukraine (Воєнний кабінет при Раді національної безпеки i оборони України) acts as a section of the CNSDU and while the wider body is tasked with the national security in the broader sense, including financial security, foreign policy, social policy etc., the Military Cabinet is concentrated on the military threats to national defence.

Some of the members of the CNSDU are also members of its Military Cabinet (The President, the Prime Minister, the ministers of interior affairs, of foreign affairs, of defence, the Chairman of the Verkhovna Rada, the Commander-in-Chief of the Armed Forces, the Chief of the Office of the President, the Chief of the National Security Service), and additional members of the Military Cabinet include the Chief of the General Staff, Chief of the State Border Guard Service and the Chief of the National Guard).

==== Headquarters of the Supreme Commander-in-Chief of the Armed Forces ====
In case of war Article 7 of the Ukrainian Law "On the Armed Forces of Ukraine" (Про Збройні Сили України) prescribes the formation of Stavka of the Supreme Commander-in-Chief (Ukrainian: Ставка Верховного Головнокомандувача) as an advisory council aiding the President in the command of the armed forces. In light of the 2022 Russian invasion of Ukraine, this provision was enacted for the first time when President Volodymyr Zelenskyy issued an executive order on 25 February 2022 to establish such a Headquarters.

- See Headquarters of the Supreme Commander-in-Chief § Structure and headquarters personnel for a current full list of staff.

=== Commander-in-Chief of the Armed Forces ===
The highest-ranking military officer is the Commander-in-Chief of the Armed Forces of Ukraine (Головнокомандувач Збройних сил України) in the rank of a full General / Admiral.

The position was created on 27 March 2020, by Executive Order No.123/2020 of the President.

Until then the Chief of the General Staff was also the Commander-in-Chief of the UAF.

The two responsibilities were split for the newly created CinC UAF to take a more direct role in the overall command of the troops and the CGS to retain the administrative and long-term planning role.

Commander-in-Chief of the Armed Forces of Ukraine (Головнокомандувач Збройних сил України) – General Zaluzhnyi, Valerii Fyodorovych

Deputy Commander-in-Chief of the Armed Forces of Ukraine (Заступник Головнокомандувача Збройних сил України) – Lieutenant-General Moysyuk, Yevhen Heorgiyovych

The CinC AFU is aided in his activities by the Kyiv-based Office of the Commander in Chief of the Armed Forces.

==== Office of the Commander in Chief of the Armed Forces ====
Apparatus [Office] of the Commander-in-Chief of the Armed Forces of Ukraine (Апарат головнокомандувача Збройних Сил України):

- Office Command
- Strategic Communications Directorate
- Automatization Development Directorate
- Internal Control Directorate
- Office of Advisors
- Office of Assistants of the CinC UAF
- Department of Protocol
- Secret Documents Support Section

The position of the CinC AFU has been established by the Law "On the Transformation of the Joint Command and Control System of the Defence Forces" ("Про трансформацію системи об'єднаного керівництва силами оборони") as the supreme professional authority on matters of national defence and security, therefore the incumbent holder has direct control over the Chief of the General Staff, Commander of the Joint Forces, commanders of the various armed services, separate arms and branches and separate military units, as well as shared authority with the Minister of Interior Affairs and the chiefs of the various national security services on matters of strategic planning, generation of forces and principles for their actions in case of a state of a martial law, as well as operational control during wartime.

==== Chief of the General staff ====
The General staff of the Armed Forces of Ukraine is the main body of military management for strategic planning of the Armed Forces of Ukraine and other forces and means of other components of the defence forces, coordination and control over defence tasks between government services, regional governments and municipal bodies and the defence forces in the manner established by the country's legal framework, acts of the President of Ukraine and the Cabinet of Ministers of Ukraine and defense legislation of the Supreme Council.

==== Commander of the Joint Forces Command, Armed Forces of Ukraine ====
The main functional purpose of the Joint Forces Command is to plan and manage the joint forces of the AFU in operations to repel armed aggression against Ukraine and to command and control national contingents and personnel involved in international peacekeeping and security operations.

The Joint Forces Command (JFC) is the successor to the former Joint Operational Headquarters of the Armed Forces of Ukraine.

It is headed by the Joint Forces Commander, who reports directly to the Commander-in-Chief of the Armed Forces of Ukraine and directs the Joint Forces in all domains of their application (land, air, sea, information).

The JFC is the command authority for the Joint Forces Operation (Ukrainian: Операція об'єднаних сил) in the eastern Russian-occupied separatist regions of Donetsk and Luhansk, an operation which took over from the previous Anti-Terrorist Operation (ATO).

==== Commanders of the armed services, separate combat arms and support branches ====
The commanders of the three main armed services – the Ground Forces, Air Force and the Navy, report to the CinC UAF and their main role is to provide force generation and readiness of their respective services, arms and branches.

The commanders of the three separate combat arms – the Air Assault Forces, Marine Corps and the Special Operations Forces also report to the C-in-C, but unlike the three armed services commanders, they are invested both with a force generation role, as well as operational command and control of their units.

Operational command and control is executed by services, arms and branches-specific component commands under the Joint Forces Command.

Armed services:

- Commander of the Ukrainian Ground Forces
- Commander of the Ukrainian Air Force
- Commander of the Ukrainian Navy

Separate combat arms:

- Commandant of the Marine Corps
- Commander of the Air Assault Forces
- Commander of the Signals and Cybernetic Security Forces

Separate support branches:

- Commander of the Support Forces
- Commander of the Logistical Forces
- Commander of the Medical Forces

Special Operations Forces:

The Special Operations Forces are a special separate combat arm. Unlike the Air Assault Forces, Marine Corps and the Signals and Cybernetic Security Forces, which are subordinated operationally to the Commander of the Joint Forces, the SOF report both administratively and operationally directly to CinC UAF.

- Commander of the Special Operations Forces

The Military Police is a separate service subordinated to the Minister of Defence.

==== Shared role in strategic planning ====
The CinC AFU shares the strategic planning for the development of various services, which are outside of the Armed Forces during peacetime, but are transferred in cases of wartime mobilization under his office.

Services under the Ministry of Defence

- State Special Transport Service (Ukrainian: Державна спеціальна служба транспорту) – the former Railway Troops (1992– 2004). It includes a central Administration (Military Unit MUN Т0100, Kiyv); the 1st Separate, named after Kniaz Lev, Brigade of the SSTS (1 окрема бригада імені князя Лева Державної спеціальної служби транспорту) (MUN Т0110, Lviv); the 26th Separate Dniprovs'ka Brigade (26 окрема Дніпровська бригада) (MUN Т0120, Dnipro); the 36th [Rail-]Road Repair and Overhaul Konotops'kiy Regiment (36 шляхо-відновлювальний Конотопський полк) (MUN Т0330, Konotop); the 194th Pontoon-Bridging Regiment (194 понтонно-мостовий полк) (MUN Т0320, Novomoskovs'k), the 195th Central Base for Railway Equipment (195 центральна база залізничної техніки) (MUN Т0710, Kiyv) and two training establishments – the Chair for Training of Military Specialists of the SSTS at the Dnipropetrovs'k National University for Rail Transport (Кафедра військової підготовки спеціалістів Держспецтрансслужби Дніпропетровського національного університету залізничного транспорту) (in Dnipro) and the 8th Training Chernihiv Center of the SSTS (8 навчальний Чернігівський центр Держспецтрансслужби України) (MUN Т0500, Chernihiv)

Services under the Ministry of Internal Affairs

- National Guard of Ukraine (Національна гвардія України)
- National Police of Ukraine (Національна поліція України)
- State Emergency Service of Ukraine (Державна служба України з надзвичайних ситуацій)

Services under the Administration of the President

- State Border Guard Service of Ukraine (Державна прикордонна служба України)
- State Special Communications Service of Ukraine (Державна служба спеціального зв'язку та захисту інформації України)

== Ministry of Defence ==
The following establishments and institutions are directly subordinate to the Ministry of Defence.

Structures directly subordinated to the Ukrainian Ministry of Defence (Ukrainian: Структури безпосереднього підпорядкування Міністерства оборони України)

Ukrainian Ministry of Defence Apparatus (Апарат Міністерства оборони України), Kyiv

- Main Intelligence Directorate (Головне управління розвідки)
- Security Service of the Ministry of Defence (Патронатна служба Міністра оборони України)
- Main Inspection (Головна інспекція)
- Defence Policies Directorate (Директорат політики у сфері оборони)
- Defence Information Policies and Strategic Communications Directorate (Директорат інформаційної політики у сфері оборони та стратегічних комунікацій)
- Military Education and Science Department (Департамент військової освіти і науки)
- Military Technical Policies, Development and Military Weaponry and Equipment Department (Департамент військово-технічної політики, розвитку озброєння та військової техніки)
- Internal Audit department (Департамент внутрішнього аудиту)
- Military Policies and Strategic Planning Department (Департамент воєнної політики та стратегічного планування)
- State Purchases and Deliveries of Material Resources Department (Департамент державних закупівель та постачання матеріальних ресурсів)
- Information Organisation Works and Control Department (Департамент інформаційно-організаційної роботи та контролю)
- Personnel Policies Department (Департамент кадрової політики)
- International Defence Co-operation Department (Департамент міжнародного оборонного співробітництва)
- Social and Personnel Policies Support Department (Департамент соціального та гуманітарного забезпечення)
- Financial Department (Департамент фінансів)
- Judicial Support Department (Департамент юридичного забезпечення)
- Military Representations Directorate (Управління військових представництв)
- Anti-Corruption Directorate (Управління з питань запобігання та виявлення корупції)
- State Secrets Security Directorate (Управління охорони державної таємниці)
- Press and Information Directorate (Управління преси та інформації)
- Physical Culture and Sport Directorate (Управління фізичної культури і спорту)
- Control Measures Co-ordination Unit (Відділ координації контрольних заходів)
- Mobilisation Preparedness Unit (Мобілізаційний відділ)

State Aviation Scientific Development Institute (Державний науково-дослідний інститут авіації), Kyiv

State Scientific Test Center of the AFU (Державний науково-випробувальний центр Збройних Сил України, MUN А4444), Honcharivsk, Chernihiv Oblast

Central Scientific Research Institute of the AFU (Центральний науково-дослідний інститут Збройних Сил України, MUN А0202), Kyiv

Central Military Weaponry and Equipment Scientific Research Institute of the AFU (Центральний науково-дослідний інститут озброєння і військової техніки ЗСУ, MUN А4566), Kyiv

Scientific Research Center of the Rocket Forces and Field Artillery (Науково-дослідний центр ракетних військ і артилерії, MUN А????), Sumy, Sumy Oblast

Scientific Research Center for Humanitarian Matters of the AFU (Науково-дослідний центр гуманітарних проблем Збройних Сил України, MUN А2350), Kyiv

Central Directorate for Acquisition and Delivery of Material Supplies of the AFU (Центральне управління розвитку та супроводження матеріального забезпечення ЗСУ), Kyiv

Codification Bureau (Бюро кодифікації) (MUN А2387), Kyiv

Military Delegations of the MoU (Ukrainian: Військові представництва Міністерства оборони)

other directly subordinated units under the Ministry (iнші безпосередньо підпорядковані структури)

=== Chief of the General staff ===
The Chief of the General Staff of the Armed Forces of Ukraine (Ukrainian: Начальник Генерального штабу Збройних Сил України) oversees the strategic planning and force generation of the Armed Forces of Ukraine.

Chief of the General Staff (Начальник Генерального штабу) – Lieutenant-General Shaptala, Serhiy Oleksandrovich

[First] Deputy Chief of the General Staff (Заступник Начальника ГШ) – Lieutenant-General Bokiy, Viktor Hrihorovich

Deputy Chief of the General Staff (Заступник Начальника ГШ) – Brigadier General Kirilenko, Oleksandr Mykolayovich

Deputy Chief of the General Staff (Заступник Начальника ГШ) – Colonel Koval', Volodimir Valeriyovich

General Staff of the Armed Forces of Ukraine (Ukrainian: Генеральний штаб Збройних Сил України), Kyiv

- Deputy Chiefs of the General Staff of the UAF (Заступники начальника Генерального штабу Збройних Сил України)
  - J-1 Main Directorate of Personnel (J-1 Головне управлiння персоналу)
  - J-2 Intelligence Organ (J-2 Розвiдувальний орган)
  - J-3 Main Directorate of Operations (J-3 Головне оперативне управлiння)
  - J-4 Main Directorate of Logistics (J-4 Головне управлiння логiстики)
  - J-5 Main Directorate of Defence Planning (J-5 Ukrainian: Головне управлiння оборонного планування)
  - J-6 Central Directorate of Communication and Information Systems (J-6 Центральне управлiння зв'язку та iнформацiйних систем)
  - J-7 Main Directorate of Doctrine and Training (J-7 Головне управлiння доктрин та пiдготовки)
  - J-8 Central Directorate of Defence Resources (J-8 Центральне управлiння оборонних ресурсiв)
  - J-9 Directorate of Civil-Military Cooperation (J-9 Управлiння цивiльно-вiйськового спiвробiтництва)
  - Military Scientific Directorate (Воєнно-наукове управлiння)
  - Central Directorate for Protection of State Secrets and Security (Центральне управлiння охорони державної таємницi та захисту)
  - Legal Support Directorate (Управлiння правового забезпечення)
  - Financial Directorate (Фiнансове управлiння), Administrative Directorate (Адмiнiстративне управлiння)

==== Directly reporting formations of the General staff ====
The following are units directly subordinated to the General Staff of the Armed Forces of Ukraine (Ukrainian: частини безпосереднього підпорядкування Генеральному штабу ЗС України)

- Joint Forces Command of the Armed Forces of Ukraine (Командування об'єднаних сил Збройних Сил України) (MUN А0135), Kyiv
- Main Command Center of the Armed Forces of Ukraine (Головний командний центр Збройних Сил України) (MUN А0911), Kyiv
- Back-up Command Center of the UAF (Запасний командний пункт Генерального штабу Збройних Сил України) (MUN А3258), Radomyshl, Zhytomyr Oblast
- 15th Airborne Command and Control Center of the General Staff of the AFU (15-ий повітряний пункт управління ГШ ЗСУ) (MUN А0905), Vinnytsia, Vinnytsia Oblast
- Main Directorate for Moral and Psychological Support of the AFU (Головне управління морально-психологічного забезпечення ЗСУ), Kyiv
- Main Directorate for Military Cooperation and Verification of the AFU (Головне управління військового співробітництва і верифікації ЗСУ), Kyiv
- Central Military Security Directorate (Центральне управління безпеки військової служби), Kyiv
- Directorate for Career Development of NCO Personnel (Управління по роботі з сержантським складом), Kyiv
- 101st Separate Security Brigade of the General Staff 'Colonel-General Henadii Vorobiov' (101-a окрема бригада охорони Генерального штабу iмені генерал-полковника Генадія Воробйова) (MUN А0139), Kyiv
- other units and establishments directly under the General Staff of the AFU (iнші частини та установи безпосереднього підпорядкування Генерального штабу ЗС України)

Military Education Establishments and Units (directly under the MoD) (військові навчальні заклади та частини, які не входять до видів Збройних Сил України)

- National Defense University of Ukraine 'Ivan Chernyakhovsky' (Ukrainian: Національний університет оборони України імені І.Черняховського), Kyiv
- Military Institute of the Taras Shevchenko National University of Kyiv (Військовий інститут Київського національного університету імені Т.Шевченка), Kyiv
- Zhytomyr Military Institute 'Sergei Korolev' (Житомирський військовий інститут імені С.Корольова), Zhytomyr, Zhytomyr Oblast
  - 190th Training Center (190-ий навчальний центр), Huyva, Zhytomyr Oblast
- Military Judicial Institute of the Yaroslav Mudryi National Law University (Військово-юридичний інститут Національного юридичного університету імені Ярослава Мудрого), Kharkiv, Kharkiv Oblast
- Kyiv Military High School 'Ivan Bohun' (Київський військовий ліцей імені Івана Богуна), Kyiv

=== Joint Forces Command ===
The Commander of the Joint Forces has direct command and control over the operational combat, combat support and combat service support units, involved in military operations in land and overseas and military exercises during peacetime, as well as during wartime operations.

- Joint Forces Operation (Ukrainian: Операція об'єднаних сил), commands the armed forces and security forces contingents facing the Russian-controlled Donbass separatist forces, successor to the previous Anti-Terror Operation (ATO). The forces deployed in the JFO are also known as the Joint Forces Groupment (Угруповання Об'єднаних сил) (Commander of the JFO: Major-General Eduard Moskaliov)
- Ground Forces operational forces:
  - Operational Command "West" (Ukrainian: Оперативне командування «Захід», ОК «Захід», MUN А0796), HQ in Rivne, Rivne Oblast, Commander: Major-General Serhiy Litvinov, the AOR covers 8 oblasts: Volyn, Zakarpattia, Ivano-Frankivsk, Lviv, Rivne, Ternopil, Khmelnitsky and Chernivtsi oblasts.
  - Operational Command "South" (Оперативне командування «Південь», ОК «Південь», MUN А2393), HQ in Odesa, Odesa Oblast, Commander: Major-General Andriy Koval'chuk, the AOR covers 5 oblasts: Vinnytsia, Kirovohrad, Mykolaiv, Odesa and Kherson oblasts, as well as nominally Russian-occupied Crimea and the city of Sevastopol, designated as the Separate Military Ground Forces Area (Окремий військово-сухопутний район).
  - Operational Command "North" (Оперативне командування «Північ», ОК «Північ», MUN А4583), HQ in the capital Kyiv, Commander: Major-General Viktor Nikolyuk, the AOR covers six oblasts: Kyiv, Zhytomyr, Poltava, Sumy, Cherkassy and Chernihiv oblasts and the capital city of Kyiv.
  - Operational Command "East" (Оперативне командування «Схід», ОК «Схід», MUN А1314), HQ in Dnipro, Dnipropetrovsk Oblast, Commander: Major-General Oleh Mikats, AOR covers five oblasts: Zaporizhzhia, Dnipropetrovsk, Kharkiv, Donetsk and Luhansk oblasts, although forces involved in the JFO operate independently.
  - Directly reporting units (Частини безпосереднього підпорядкування) – Missile and Rocket Forces and Artillery; Army Aviation etc.
- Air Force operational forces:
  - Air Force Command "West" (Повітряне командування «Захід», ПвК «Захід», MUN А0780), HQ in Lviv, Lviv Oblast, Commander: Major-General Oleksiy Marchenko, AOR covers Volyn, Zakarpattia, Ivano-Frankivsk, Lviv, Rivne, Ternopil, Khmelnitsky and Chernivtsi oblasts.
  - Air Force Command "South" (Повітряне командування «Південь», ПвК «Південь», MUN А0800), HQ in Odesa, Odesa Oblast, Commander: Lieutenant-General Vasil' Chernenko, AOR covers completely Odesa, Mykolaiv and Kherson oblasts, parts of Dnipropetrovsk, Kirovohrad and Zaporizhzhia oblast as well as nominally the territory of Russian-occupied Crimea with the city of Sevastopol, designated as the Separate Military Air Force Area (Окремий військово-повітряний район).
  - Air Force Command "Center" (Повітряне командування «Центр», ПвК «Центр», MUN А0820), HQ in Vasylkiv Air Base, Kyiv Oblast, south of the capital city of Kyiv, Commander: Lieutenant-General Anatoliy Kryvonozhko, AOR covers completely Vinnytsia, Zhytomyr, Kyiv, Cherkassy and Chernihiv oblasts, parts of Poltava, Sumy and Kirovohrad oblasts and the capital city of Kyiv itself.
  - Air Force Command "East" (Повітряне командування «Схід», ПвК «Схід», MUN А2533), HQ in Dnipro, Dnipropetrovsk Oblast, Commander: Major-General Ivan Terebukha, AOR covers completely Dnipropetrovsk, Kharkiv, Donetsk and Luhansk oblasts and parts of Zaporizhzhia, Kirovohrad, Poltava and Sumy oblasts.
  - Directly reporting units (Частини безпосереднього підпорядкування) – fighter-bomber aviation, UAV aviation, transport aviation, signals, electronic warfare, command and control units etc.
- Marine Corps operational forces:
  - Marine Corps General Command (Командування морської піхоти, MUN А2022), HQ in Mykolaiv, Mykolaiv Oblast, Commandant: Lieutenant-General Yuriy Sodol
- Navy operational forces:
  - Ukrainian Navy Flotilla (Ukrainian: Флотилія Військово-Морських Сил України, Флотилія ВМСУ, MUN А0437), HQ in Odesa, Odesa Oblast, Commander: Captain First Rank Yuriy Fedash
  - Directly reporting units (Частини безпосереднього підпорядкування) – naval aviation brigade, anti-ship missiles and artillery, naval bases, other support units
- Air Assault Forces operational forces:
  - Air Assault Forces General Command (Ukrainian: Командування Десантно-штурмових військ, КДШВ ЗСУ), MUN А3771), HQ in Zhytomyr, Zhytomyr Oblast, Commander: Major-General Maksim Mirgorodsk'kiy
- Combat support and combat service support forces:
  - Signals and Cyber Defence Troops Command AFU (Командування Військ зв'язку та кібернетичної безпеки Збройних Сил, Ком ВЗтаКБ ЗС), MUN А0106), HQ in Kyiv, Commander: Major-General Yevhen Stepanenko
  - Support Forces Command UAF (Командування Сил підтримки Збройних сил України, КСП ЗСУ, MUN А2330), HQ in Kyiv, Commander: Brigade General Dmitro Herekha
  - Logistical Forces Command UAF (Командування Сил логістики Збройних сил, КСЛ ЗСУ, MUN А0307), HQ in Kyiv, Commander: Major-General Oleh Hulyak
  - Medical Forces Command UAF (Командування Медичних сил Збройних Сил України, КМС ЗСУ), MUN А0928), HQ in Kyiv, Commander: Brigade General Tetyana Ostashchenko

=== Ukrainian Ground Forces ===
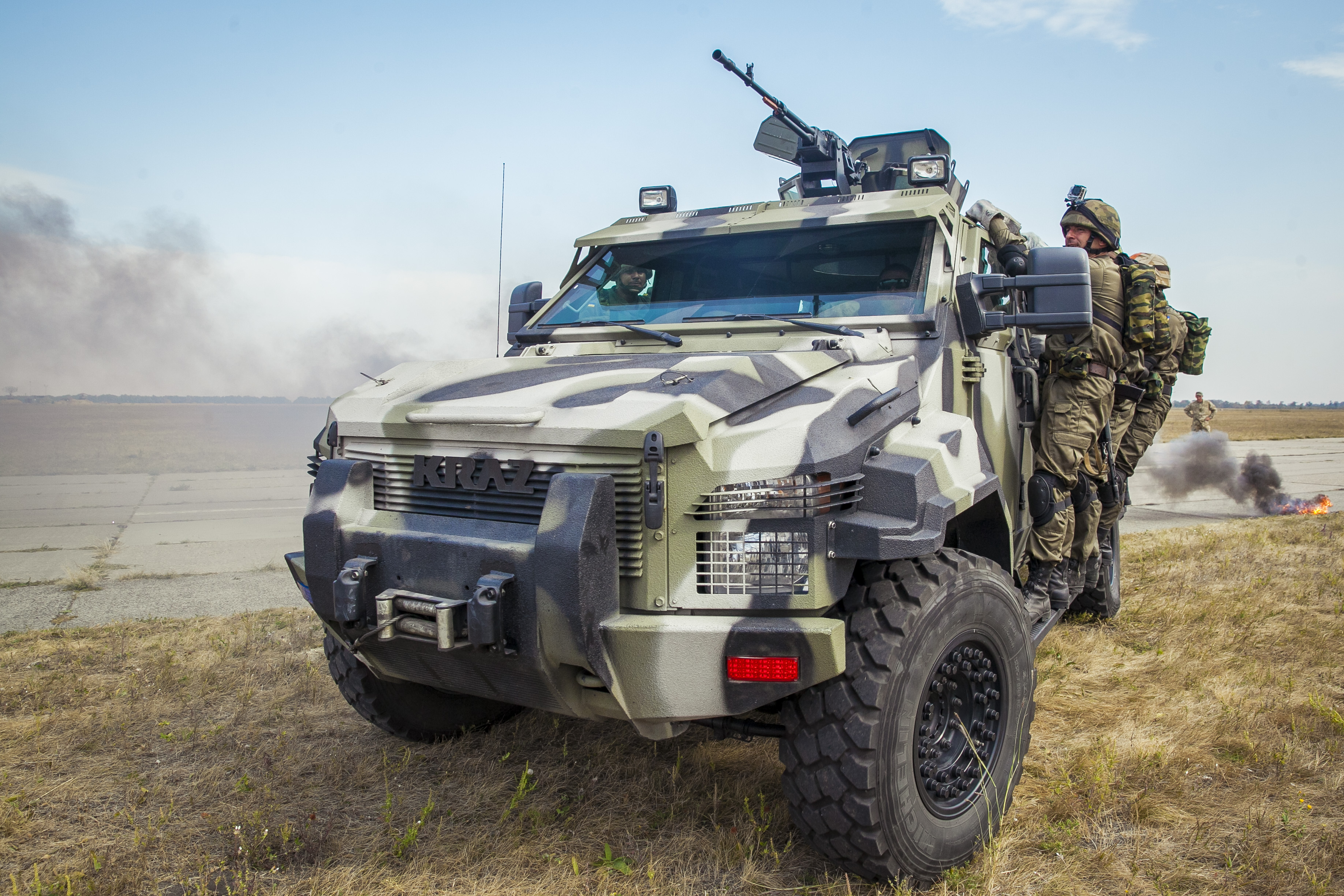
KRAZ Spartan

As of 2016, there were a reported 169,000 personnel in the Ukrainian Ground Forces. The Ukrainian Ground Forces are divided into Armoured and Mechanized Forces, Army Aviation, Army Air Defence and Rocket and Artillery Troops. There are 13 mechanized brigades and two mountain warfare brigades in the Mechanized Forces. Ukraine also has two armoured brigades. There are also seven rocket and artillery brigades. Until 2013, the Ground Forces were divided into three army corps. These were disbanded in 2013 and reorganized as Operation Command West, Operation Command North and Operation Command South. Operation Command East was formed in 2015 to coordinate forces in the war in Donbas.

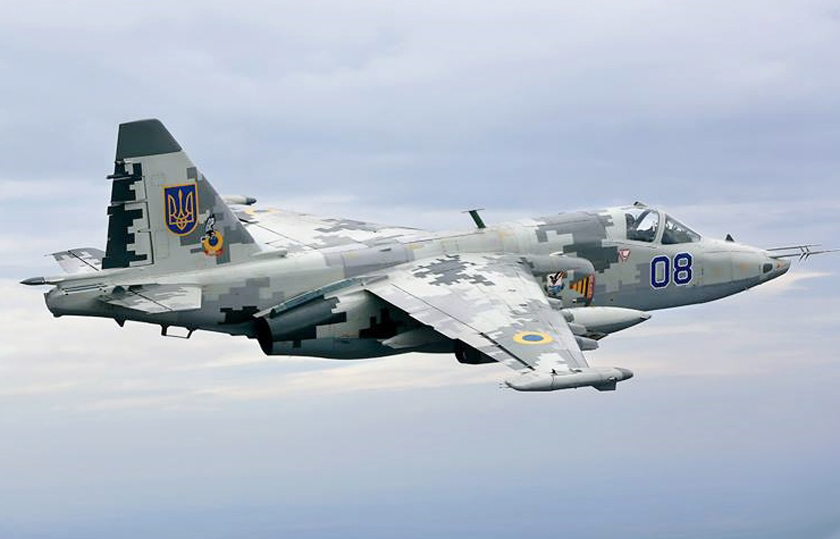
Ukrainian Su-25

=== Ukrainian Air Force ===
In 2016, the Ukrainian Air Force was reported to have included 36,300 personnel.

=== Ukrainian Naval Service ===
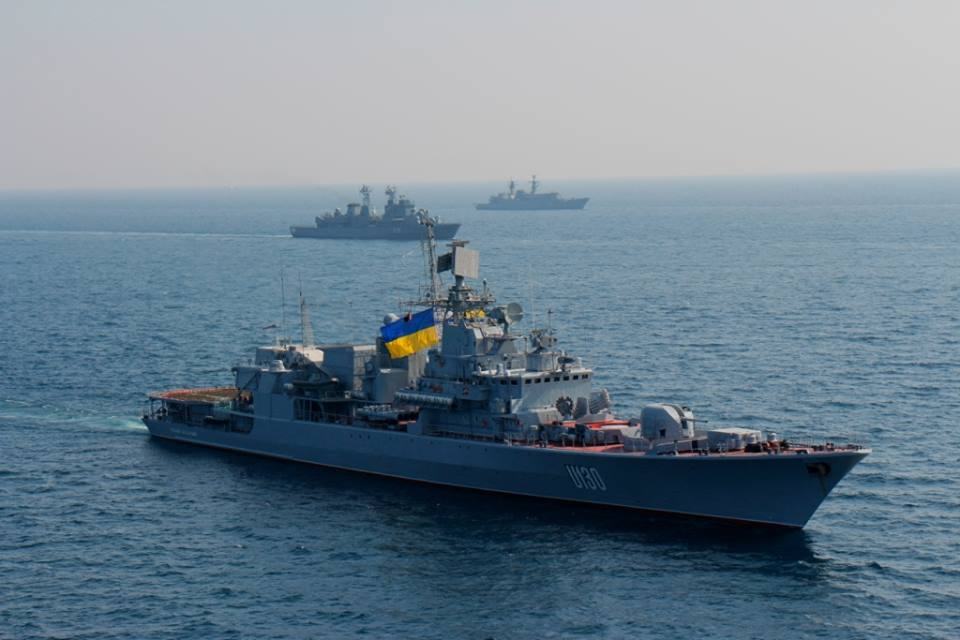
The Krivak III-class frigate Hetman Sahaydachniy; the current flagship of the Ukrainian Navy

According to an August 2015 Kyiv Post report, the Ukrainian Navy consisted of 6,500 personnel, Marine Corps then included.

=== Air Assault and Airborne Forces ===
The Ukrainian Airborne and Air Assault Forces are composed of 8 air landing, air assault and air-mobile brigades and support units.

Airborne and Air Assault Forces Command (Ukrainian: Командування Десантно-штурмових військ) (MUN А3771), Zhytomyr, Zhytomyr Oblast

- support units (частини забезпечення)
  - 135th Separate Command Battalion (135-ий окремий батальйон управління), Zhytomyr, Zhytomyr Oblast
  - 347th Information and Telecommunications Nod (347-й інформаційно-телекомунікаційний вузол), Zhytomyr, Zhytomyr Oblast
  - Airborne Forces Support Commandature (комендатура десантного забезпечення)
  - 132nd Separate Reconnaissance Battalion (132-й окремий розвідувальний батальйон), Ozerne Air Base, Zhytomyr Oblast
  - 102nd Separate Storage for Airborne Vehicles and Equipment (102-й окремий склад зберігання повітрянодесантної техніки та майна), Zhytomyr, Zhytomyr Oblast
  - 232nd Joint Supply Base (232-а об'єднана база забезпечення), Rakhni village, Vinnytsia Oblast
  - 124th Topographic Unit (124-а топографічна частина), Zhytomyr, Zhytomyr Oblast (part of the Military Topographic Service (of the Support Forces Command), attached to the Air Assault and Airborne Forces)
- combat forces (Склад десантно-штумових військ Збройних сил України)
  - airborne
    - 25th Separate Airborne 'Sicheslavska' Brigade (Ukrainian: 25-а окрема повітрянодесантна Січеславська бригада, MUN А1126), с-ще Гвардійське Дніпровського району Дніпропетровської області
  - air assault
    - 45th Separate Air Landing Assault Brigade (45-а окрема десантно-штурмова бригада, MUN A????), Болград, Одеська область
    - 46th Separate Air Landing Assault Brigade (46-а окрема десантно-штурмова бригада, MUN A????), Полтава, Полтавська область
    - 79th Separate Air Landing Assault Brigade (79-а окрема десантно-штурмова бригада, MUN А0224), Миколаїв, Миколаївська область
    - 80th Separate Air Landing Assault Brigade (80-a окрема десантно-штурмова бригада, MUN А0284), MM2582, м. Львів, м. Чернівці
    - 95th Separate Air Landing Assault Brigade (95-a окрема десантно-штурмова бригада, MUN А0281), Zhytomyr, Zhytomyr Oblast
  - air mobile
    - 81st Separate Airmobile Brigade (Ukrainian: 81-а окрема аеромобільна бригада), Kramatorsk, Donetsk Oblast
  - 23rd Separate Tank Battalion (23-ій окремий танковий батальйон), Velikyi Kobilin, Zhytomyr Oblast
  - 148th Separate Howitzer Self-Propelled Artillery Brigade (148-ий окремий гаубичний самохідний артилерійський дивізіон), Zhytomyr, Zhytomyr Oblast
- training units (навчальні частини)
  - 199th Training Center (199-ий навчальний центр), Zhytomyr, Zhytomyr Oblast
    - 37th Combined Arms Training Range (37-ий загальновійськовий полігон), Perlyavka village, Teterіvka Raion, Zhytomyr, Zhytomyr Oblast

=== Special Operations Forces ===
Ukraine's special forces are reported as 4,000 strong.

Special Operations Forces Command (Ukrainian: Командування сил спеціальних операцій, MUN А0987), Kyiv

- command and combat support units (частини управління й бойового забезпечення):
  - 99th Separate Command and Support Battalion (99-й окремий батальйон управління та забезпечення, MUN А3628), Berdychiv, Zhytomyr Oblast
  - 142nd Education and Training Center (142-й навчально-тренувальний центр, MUN А2772), Berdychiv, Zhytomyr Oblast
- land warfare special purpose units (сухопутні частини спеціального призначення):
  - 3rd Separate Special Purpose Regiment 'Kniaz Sviatoslav the Brave' (3-й окремий полк спеціального призначення імені князя Святослава Хороброго, MUN А0680), Kropyvnytskyi, Kirovohrad Oblast
  - 8th Separate Special Purpose Regiment 'Iziaslav Mstislavich' (8-й окремий полк спеціального призначення ім. Ізяслава Мстиславовича, MUN A0553), Khmelnytskyi, Khmelnytskyi Oblast
  - 140th Separate Special Operations Forces Center (140-й окремий центр сил спеціальних операцій, MUN А0661), Khmelnitskyi, Khmelnytskyi Oblast
- seaborne special purpose units (морські частини спеціального призначення):
  - 73rd Maritime Special Operations Center 'Kish otaman Antin Holovaty' (73rd Naval Special Operations Regiment, MUN A3199), Kozachyi Island, Ochakiv, Mykolaiv Oblast
- aviation special purpose units (авіаційні частини спеціального призначення):
  - 35th Mixed Aviation Squadron (35-та змішана авіаційна ескадрилья), Havryshivka Air Base (Vinnytsia IAP), Vinnytsia Oblast

=== Signals and Cybernetic Security Forces ===
The Signals and Cybernetic Security Troops Command of the Ukrainian Armed Forces (Командування Військ зв'язку та кібернетичної безпеки Збройних Сил України) is a separate joint forces command under the General Staff since 5 February 2020.

Signals and Cybernetic Security Troops Command (Командування Військ зв'язку та кібербезпеки, MUN А0106), Kyiv

- Main Command Post of the Signals and Information Systems (Головний пункт управління системою зв'язку та інформаційних систем, MUN А2666), Kyiv
- Main Center for Information and Telecommunications Systems Security Control (Головний центр контролю безпеки в інформаційно-телекомунікаційних системах, MUN А0334), Kyiv
- Main Information and Telecommunications Nod (Головний інформаційно-телекомунікаційний вузол, MUN А0351), Kyiv
- 1st Separate Field 'Proskurov' Signals Nod (1-ий окремий польовий Проскурівський вузол зв'язку, MUN А0565), Kyiv
- 3rd Separate Signals Brigade (3-я окрема бригада зв'язку, MUN А0415), Semipolki, Kyiv Oblast
- 8th Separate Signals Regiment (8-ий окремий полк зв'язку, MUN А0707), Haisyn, Vinnytsia Oblast
- 330th Central Nod of the Feldjaeger-Postal [Field Courier] Service (330-ий центральний вузол фельд'єгерсько-поштового зв'язку, MUN А0168), Kyiv
- 1899th Central Base for Repair and Overhaul of Special Signals Equipment (1899–а центральна база ремонту та зберігання засобів зв'язку, MUN А0476), Kyiv

training establishments and units (навчальні заклади/частини)

- Military Institute for Telecommunications and Information Automatization (MITIA) 'Heroes of Kruty' (Ukrainian: Військовий інститут телекомунікацій та інформатизації імені Героїв Крут, ВІТІ), Kyiv
- Military College for NCO Personnel of the MITIA (Військовий коледж сержантського складу ВІТІ), Poltava, Poltava Oblast
- 179th Joint Education and Training Center of the Signals Troops (179-ий об'єднаний навчально-тренувальний центр військ зв'язку, MUN А3990), Poltava, Poltava Oblast

under other services and troops (iнші види та роди військ/сил)

- Signals and Information Systems Center of the Joint Forces Command of the Ukrainian Armed Forces (Ukrainian: Центр зв’язку та інформаційних систем Командування об'єднаних сил ЗСУ), Kyiv
- signals and information systems directorates to the headquarters of the ground forces, air force, navy, air landing and assault troops, special operations forces, territorial defence forces, support forces, logistical forces etc. (управління зв’язку та інформаційних систем штабів КСВ, КПС, КВМС, КДШВ, КССпО, КСТрО, КСП, КСЛ, відділ ЗІС КМС, з підпрядкованими частинами та підрозділами зв'язку)

=== Support Forces ===
Since 1 January 2022 the Support Forces have the status of a separate joint branch under the General Staff.

Support Forces Command (Ukrainian: Командування Сил підтримки, MUN А2330), Kyiv

- Central Directorate of Engineer Troops of the UAF (Центральне управління інженерних військ ЗС України, MUN А0107), Kyiv
  - 20th Arsenal of the Engineer Troops (20-ий арсенал інженерних військ, MUN А0543), Olshanytsia, Kyiv Oblast and Nizhyn, Chernihiv Oblast
  - 47th Engineering Brigade (47-а інженерна бригада, MUN А2755), Dubno, Rivne Oblast
    - 301st Separate Road Traffic Control Battalion (301-ий окремий дорожньо-комендантський батальйон)
    - 304th Separate Road Traffic Control Battalion (304-ий окремий дорожньо-комендантський батальйон)
  - 48th Engineering Brigade (48-а інженерна Кам'янець-Подільська бригада, MUN А2738), Kamianets-Podilskyi, Khmelnytskyi Oblast
    - 11th Separate Pontoon-Bridging Battalion (11-ий окремий понтонно-мостовий батальйон)
    - 308th Separate Engineer Technical Battalion (308-ий окремий інженерно-технічний батальйон)
    - 309th Separate Engineer Technical Battalion (309-ий окремий інженерно-технічний батальйон)
    - 310th Separate Engineer Technical Battalion (310-ий окремий інженерно-технічний батальйон)
    - 311th Separate Engineer Technical Battalion (311-ий окремий інженерно-технічний батальйон)
    - 321st Separate Engineer Battalion (321-ий окремий інженерний батальйон)
  - 49th Demining Brigade (49-та окрема бригада розмінування)
  - 70th Support Brigade (70 Окрема Бригада Підтримки, MUN А0853), Bar, Vinnytsia Oblast
  - 107th Road Maintenance Center (107-ий центр дорожнього забезпечення, MUN А1519), Dubno, Rivne Oblast
  - 808th Support Brigade (808-ма окрема бригада підтримки, MUN А3955), Bilhorod-Dnistrovskyi, Odesa Oblast
  - 3046th Central Base for Engineer Ammunitions (3046-а центральна база інженерних боєприпасів, MUN А2647), Malynivka, Kharkiv Oblast
  - Center for Special Engineering Works (Центр спеціальних інженерних робіт, MUN А1333), Kyiv
- Central Directorate of the NBC Defence Troops of the UAF (Центральне управління військ РХБЗ ЗСУ, MUN А0108), Kyiv
  - NBC Surveillance and Analysis Center (Розрахунково-аналітичний центр РХБЗ), Kyiv
  - 704th CBRN Protection Brigade (704-та бригада РХБЗ, MUN А0807), м. Самбір Львівської області
  - 536th Central Base for Repair and Maintenance of NBC Defence Equipment (536-а центральна база ремонту і зберігання (озброєння РХБЗ), MUN А0312), Seleshtina-1, Poltava Oblast
- Central Directorate for Radio-Electronic Warfare of the UAF (Центральне управління радіоелектронної боротьби ЗСУ, MUN А0159), Kyiv
  - 55th Separate Special EW Center (55-ий окремий спеціальний центр РЕБ, MUN А0766), Kyiv and Brovary, Kyiv Oblast
- Central Directorate for Military Topography and Navigation of the UAF (Центральне управління воєнно-топографічне та навігації ЗС України, MUN А0115), Kyiv
  - 8th Publishing Center of the UAF (8-ий редакційно-видавничий центр ЗСУ, MUN А0602), Kyiv
  - 13th Photogrammetric Center (13-й фотограмметричний центр, MUN А3674), Odesa, Odesa Oblast
  - 16th Planning Center for Navigation Support (16-ий центр планування та контролю навігаційного забезпечення, MUN А1423), Kyiv
  - 22nd Military Mapping Unit (22-а військово-картографічна частина, MUN А1121), Kharkiv, Kharkiv Oblast
  - 64th Topography-Geodesic Center (64-ий топогеодезичний центр, MUN А4127), Shepetivka, Khmelnytskyi Oblast
  - 161st Topography-Geodesic Center (161-ий топогеодезичний центр, MUN А2308), Chernivtsi, Chernivtsi Oblast
  - 115th Mapping Center (115-ий картографічний центр, MUN А3796), Kotsyubynske, Kyiv Oblast
- Hydro-Meteorological Center of the UAF (Гідрометеорологічний центр ЗСУ, MUN А0204), Kyiv
  - hydro-meteorological units of the ground forces, air force and navy (гідрометеорологічні/метеорологічні підрозділи Повітряних Сил, ВМС та Сухопутних військ)
- training units (навчальні частини)
  - 143rd Joint Training Center (143-й Об'єднаний навчальний центр, MUN А2641), Kamianets-Podilskyi, Khmelnytskyi Oblast

=== Logistical Forces ===
Since 1 January 2022 the Logistics Forces have the status of a separate joint branch under the General Staff. The logistical forces are mainly organised in two arms – Weaponry and Rear Services.

Logistical Forces Command of the Ukrainian Armed Forces (Ukrainian: Командування Сил логістики Збройних Сил України, MUN А0307), Kyiv

- Armament Service of the UAF (Озброєння Збройних Сил України, MUN А2513)
  - Central Support Directorate for Ground Weapons Systems (Центральне управління забезпечення наземними системами озброєння)
  - Central Support Directorate for Military Equipment (Центральне управління забезпечення військовою технікою)
  - Central Support Directorate for Weapons of Mass Destruction (Центральне управління забезпечення засобами ураження)
  - Central Missile and Artillery Directorate of the UAF (Центральне ракетно-артилерійське управління ЗС України, MUN А0120)
  - Central Automobile Directorate of the UAF (Центральне автомобільне управління ЗС України, MUN А0119)
  - Central Armored Directorate of the UAF (Центральне бронетанкове управління ЗСУ, MUN А0174)
  - Department for Metrology and Standardization of the UAF (Управління метрології та стандартизації ЗСУ, MUN А2187)
- Rear Service of the Armed Forces of Ukraine (Тил Збройних Сил України, MUN А2516)
  - Central Support Directorate for Fuel and Lubricants (Центральне управління забезпечення пально-мастильними матеріалами, MUN А0125)
  - Central Support Directorate for Food Supply of the UAF (Центральне управління продовольчого забезпечення ЗСУ, MUN А0126)
  - Central Support Directorate for Material Support of the UAF (Центральне управління речового забезпечення ЗСУ, MUN А0127)
  - Central Support Directorate for Resources Supply (Центральне управління забезпечення ресурсами)
  - Central Support Directorate for Technical Equipment and Property (Центральне управління забезпечення технічними засобами та майном)
  - Central Support Directorate for Engineering and Infrastructure (Центральне управління інженерно-інфраструктурного забезпечення)
  - Central Directorate for Military Communications of the UAF (Центральне управління військових сполучень ЗС України, MUN А0671)
- military units subordinated to the Armament Service (військові частини підпорядковані Озброєнню ЗСУ)
- military units subordinated to the Rear Service (військові частини підпорядковані Тилу ЗСУ)

=== Medical Forces ===
Since 1 January 2022 the Medical Forces have the status of a separate joint branch under the General Staff.

Medical Forces Command (Ukrainian: Командування Медичних сил, MUN А0928), Kyiv

- National Military Medical Clinical Center 'Main Military Clinical Hospital' (Національний військово-медичний клінічний центр «Головний військовий клінічний госпіталь»), Kyiv
  - 71st Mobile Military Hospital (71-ий мобільний військовий госпіталь, MUN А0358), Kyiv
  - Military Medical Clinical Center for Professional Patology (ВМКЦ професійної патології особового складу, MUN А2923), Irpin, Kyiv Oblast
  - Central Dental Policlinic (Центральна стоматологічна поліклініка), Kyiv
  - Center for Medical Rehabilitation and Sanatorium Treatment 'Pushcha-Voditsya' (Центр медичної реабілітації й санаторного лікування «Пуща-Водиця», MUN А1931), Kyiv
- Military Medical Clinical Center of the Central Region (''Військово-медичний клінічний центр Центрального регіону'', MUN А????), Vinnytsia, Vinnytsia Oblast
  - 59th Mobile Military Hospital (59-ий мобільний військовий госпіталь, MUN А0206), Vinnytsia, Vinnytsia Oblast
  - 10th Military Hospital (10-ий військовий госпіталь, MUN А2339, Khmelnytskyi
  - 409th Military Hospital (409-ий військовий госпіталь) MUN А1065, м. Житомир
  - 762nd Military Hospital (762-ий військовий госпіталь) (MUN А3122, м. Біла Церква
  - ?th Military Hospital (? військовий госпіталь) (MUN А3267, м. Старокостянтинів
  - 1314th Medical Storage (1314-ий медичний склад) (MUN А1603, с. Балки Вінницької області
  - Center for Medical Rehabilitation and Sanatorium Treatment 'Khmelnyk' (Центр медичної реабілітації та санаторного лікування «Хмельник», MUN А1168), Khmelnyk, Vinnytsia Oblast
- Military Medical Clinical Center of the Southern Region (Військово-медичний клінічний центр Південного регіону, MUN A????), Odesa, Odesa Oblast
  - 38th Military Hospital (38-ий військовий госпіталь, MUN А4615), Dnipro, Dnipropetrovsk Oblast
  - 61st Military Hospital (61-ий військовий госпіталь, MUN А0318), Mariupol, Zaporizhzhia Oblast
  - 450th Military Hospital (450-ий військовий госпіталь, MUN А3309), Zaporizhzhia, Zaporizhzhia Oblast
  - 1467th Military Hospital (1467-ий військовий госпіталь, MUN А2428), Mykolaiv, Mykolaiv Oblast
  - 1644th Medical Storage (1644-й медичний склад, MUN А4619), с. Грушівка, Mykolaiv Oblast
  - Center for Medical Rehabilitation and Sanatorium Treatment 'Odeskyi' (Центр медичної реабілітації та санаторного лікування «Одеський»), Odesa, Odesa Oblast
- Military Medical Clinical Center of the Northern Region (Військово-медичний клінічний центр Північного регіону, MUN А3306), Kharkiv, Kharkiv Oblast
  - 65th Mobile Military Hospital (65-ий мобільний військовий госпіталь, MUN А0209), Kharkiv
  - 9th Military Hospital (9-ий військовий госпіталь, MUN А4302), Desna, Chernihiv Oblast
  - 387th Garrison Military Hospital (387-ий гарнізонний військовий госпіталь, MUN А3114), Poltava, Poltava Oblast
  - 407th Military Hospital (407-ий військовий госпіталь, MUN А3120), Chernihiv, Chernihiv Oblast
- Military Medical Clinical Center of the Western Region (Військово-медичний клінічний центр Західного регіону), Lviv, Lviv Oblast
  - 66th Mobile Military Hospital (66-ий мобільний військовий госпіталь, MUN А0233), Lviv, Lviv Oblast
  - 376th Military Hospital (376-ий військовий госпіталь, MUN А1028), Chernivtsi, Chernivtsi Oblast
  - 498th Military Hospital (498 військовий госпіталь, MUN А4554), Lutsk, Volyn Oblast
  - 1121st Policlinic (1121-а поліклініка), Ivano-Frankivsk, Ivano-Frankivsk Oblast
  - 1129th Garrison Military Hospital (1129-ий гарнізонний військовий госпіталь, MUN А1446), Rivne, Rivne Oblast
  - 1397th Military Hospital (1397-ий військовий госпіталь, MUN А1047) Mukachevo, Zakarpattia Oblast
  - Center for Medical Rehabilitation and Sanatorium Treatment 'Truskavetskyi' (Центр медичної реабілітації й санаторного лікування «Трускавецький») (MUN А1700), Truskavets, Lviv Oblast
- Central Sanitary Epidemiologic Directorate (Центральне санітарно-епідеміологічне управління, MUN А2417), Kyiv
  - 10th Regional Sanitary Epidemiologic Detachment (10-ий регіональний санітарно-епідеміологічний загін, MUN А0972), Kyiv
  - 27th Regional Sanitary Epidemiologic Detachment (27-ий регіональний санітарно-епідеміологічний загін, MUN А4502), Odesa, Odesa Oblast
  - 28th Regional Sanitary Epidemiologic Detachment (28-ий регіональний санітарно-епідеміологічний загін, MUN А4520), Lviv, Lviv Oblast
  - 108th Regional Sanitary Epidemiologic Detachment (108-ий регіональний санітарно-епідеміологічний загін, MUN А4510), Kharkiv, Kharkiv Oblast
  - 740th Regional Sanitary Epidemiologic Detachment (740-ий регіональний санітарно-епідеміологічний загін@, MUN А4516), Vinnytsia, Vinnytsia Oblast
- Center for Legal Expertise of the MoD (Центр судових експертиз МОУ), Kyiv
- 148th Center for Maintenance and Storage of Medical Equipment (148-ий центр формування й зберігання медичної техніки й майна, MUN А0211), Bila Tserkva, Kyiv Oblast
- 149th Center for Maintenance and Storage of Medical Equipment (149-ий центр формування й зберігання медичної техніки й майна, MUN А0503), Berdychiv, Zhytomyr Oblast
- 150th Center for Maintenance and Storage of Medical Equipment (150-ий центр формування й зберігання медичної техніки й майна, MUN А1209), Tokmak, Zaporizhzhia Oblast
- 151st Center for Maintenance and Storage of Medical Equipment (151-ий центр формування й зберігання медичної техніки й майна, MUN А2554), Terentyivka, Poltava Oblast
- 2160th Central Medical Storage (2160-ий центральний медичний склад, MUN А1382), Mankhivka, Cherkasy Oblast
- 4962nd Central Medical Storage (4962-ий центральний медичний склад, MUN А1952), Kyiv

training establishments and units (навчальні заклади та частини)

- Ukrainian Military Medical Academy (Ukrainian: Українська військово-медична академія), Kyiv

medical forces under other services and arms (iнші види та роди військ/сил))

- medical departments of the ground forces, air force, navy, air assault troops, special forces, territorial defence, support forces, logistic forces, signals and cyber-security, etc. (медичні підрозділи Сухопутних військ, Повітряних Сил, ВМС, ДШВ, ССпО, СТрО, Сил підтримки, Сил логістики, Військ зв'язку та кібербезпеки)

=== Military Police ===
The Military Police, full Military Law Enforcement Service of the Ukrainian Armed Forces (Ukrainian: Військова служба правопорядку (ВСП) Збройних Сил України), abbr. VSP in Ukrainian initialism, is a special military service outside of General Staff control and subordinated directly to the Ministry of Defence.

Main Directorate of the VSP (Головне управління Військової служби правопорядку Збройних Сил України, MUN А0880), Kyiv

- Counterincursion and Counterterror Department (Відділ протидії диверсіям та терористичним актам)

directly reporting:

- 93rd Separate VSP Battalion (93-ій окремий батальйон ВСП, MUN А2424), Kyiv
- 138th Special Purpose Center (Counterincursion and Counterterror) 'Knyaz Vladimir Svyatoslavich' (138-ий центр спеціального призначення (протидії диверсіям та терористичним атакам) імені князя Володимира Святославича, MUN А0952), Vasylkiv, Kyiv Oblast
- 307th Disciplinary Battalion of the VPS (307-ий дисциплінарний батальйон ВСП, MUN А0488), Kyiv
- 25th Training Center of the VSP (25-ий навчальний центр Військової служби правопорядку, MUN А1666), Lviv, Lviv Oblast

territorial forces:

Central Directorate (Центральне управління) (direct responsibility over Kyiv and Kyiv Oblast, MUN А2100), Kyiv

- Bila Tserkva Zonal Office (Білоцерківське зональне відділення), Bila Tserkva, Kyiv Oblast
- Zhytomyr Zonal Unit (Житомирський зональний відділ) (AOR: Zhytomyr Oblast), Zhytomyr, Zhytomyr Oblast
  - Novohrad-Volynsky Office (Новоград-Волинське відділення)
- Poltava Zonal Unit (Полтавський зональний відділ) (AOR: Poltava and Sumy Oblasts), Poltava, Poltava Oblast
  - Sumy Zonal Office (Сумське зональне відділення)
  - Konotop VSP Group (Група ВСП м. Конотоп)
- Cherkasy Zonal Unit (Черкаський зональний відділ) (AOR: Cherkasy Oblast), Cherkasy, Cherkasy Oblast
  - Uman VSP Group (Група ВСП м. Умань), Uman, Cherkasy Oblast
- Chernihiv Zonal Unit (Чернігівський зональний відділ) (AOR: Chernihiv Oblast), Chernihiv, Chernihiv Oblast
  - Desna VSP Group (Група ВСП, с-ще Десна), Desna, Chernihiv Oblast

Western Territorial Directorate (Ukrainian: Західне територіальне управління) (direct responsibility over Lviv Oblast, MUN А0583), Lviv, Lviv Oblast

- Special Purpose Unit (Відділ спеціального призначення)
- Yavoriv Zonal Office (Яворівське зональне відділення)
- 3rd Special Unit (3-й спеціальний відділ, MUN А2736), Lviv, Lviv Oblast
- Rivne Zonal Unit (Рівненський зональний відділ) (AOR: Rivne and Volyn Oblasts), Rivne, Rivne Oblast
  - Volodymyr-Volynskyi Zonal Office (Володимир-Волинське зональне відділення)
- Ternopil Zonal Unit (Тернопільський зональний відділ) (AOR: Ternopil and Ivano-Frankivsk Oblasts), Ternopil, Ternopil Oblast
  - Ivano-Frankivsk Zonal Office (Івано-Франківське зональне відділення)
- Uzhhorod Zonal Unit (Ужгородський зональний відділ) (AOR: Zakarpattia Oblast), Uzhhorod
  - Mukachevo Zonal Office (Мукачівське зональне відділення)
- Khmelnytskyi Zonal Unit (Хмельницький зональний відділ) (AOR: Khmelnytskyi Oblast), Khmelnytskyi, Khmelnytskyi Oblast

Southern Territorial Directorate (Ukrainian: Південне територіальне управління) (direct responsibility over Odesa Oblast, MUN А1495), Odesa, Odesa Oblast

- Special Purpose Unit (Відділ спеціального призначення)
- VSP Office Bilhorod-Dnistrovskyi (Відділення ВСП м. Білгород-Дністровський)
- Vinnytsia Zonal Unit (Вінницький зональний відділ) (AOR: Vinnytsia Oblast), Vinnytsia, Vinnytsia Oblast
  - Special Purpose Office (Відділення спеціального призначення)
- Mykolaiv Zonal Unit (Миколаївський зональний відділ) (AOR: Mykolaiv and Kirovohrad Oblast), Mykolaiv, Mykolaiv Oblast
  - Kirovohrad Oblast Zonal Office (Кіровоградське зональне відділення)
- Kherson Zonal Unit (Херсонський зональний відділ) (AOR: Kherson Oblast), Kherson, Kherson Oblast

Eastern Territorial Directorate (Ukrainian: Східне територіальне управління) (direct responsibility over Dnipropetrovsk Oblast, MUN А2256), Dnipro, Dnipropetrovsk Oblast

- Kryvyi Rih Zonal Office (Криворізьке зональне відділення)
- VSP Office Cherkasy (Відділення ВСП, с-ще Черкаське Самарського району)
- Special Unit 'Sarmat' (Спеціальний відділ «Сармат», MUN А2176), Zaporizhzhia, Zaporizhzhia Oblast
- Donetsk Zonal Unit (Донецький зональний відділ) (AOR: Donetsk Oblast), Kramatorsk, Donetsk Oblast
- Zaporizhzhia Zonal Unit (Запорізький зональний відділ) (AOR: Zaporizhzhia Oblast), Zaporizhzhia, Zaporizhzhia Oblast
- Luhansk Zonal Unit (Луганський зональний відділ) (AOR: Luhansk Oblast), Sievierodonetsk, Luhansk Oblast
- Kharkiv Zonal Unit (Харківський зональний відділ) (AOR: Kharkiv Oblast), Kharkiv, Kharkiv Oblast
  - Chuhuiv Office (Чугуївське відділення Харківського ЗВ ВСП)

== Personnel statistics ==
In late 2010 the total personnel (including 41,000 civilian workers) was 200,000. Conscription was ended in October 2013; at that time the Ukrainian armed forces were made up of 40% conscripts and 60% contract soldiers. In April 2014 acting President Oleksandr Turchynov reinstated conscription in May 2014.

In early 2014, Ukraine had 130,000 personnel in its armed forces that could be boosted to about one million with reservists.

There is a reported total of 250,800 personnel in the Armed Forces in 2015.
