= 211th Pontoon-Bridge Brigade =

211th Pontoon-Bridge Brigade (2024–present) 210th Pontoon Brigade Regiment (2022–2024)
- 211-та понтонно-мостова бригада
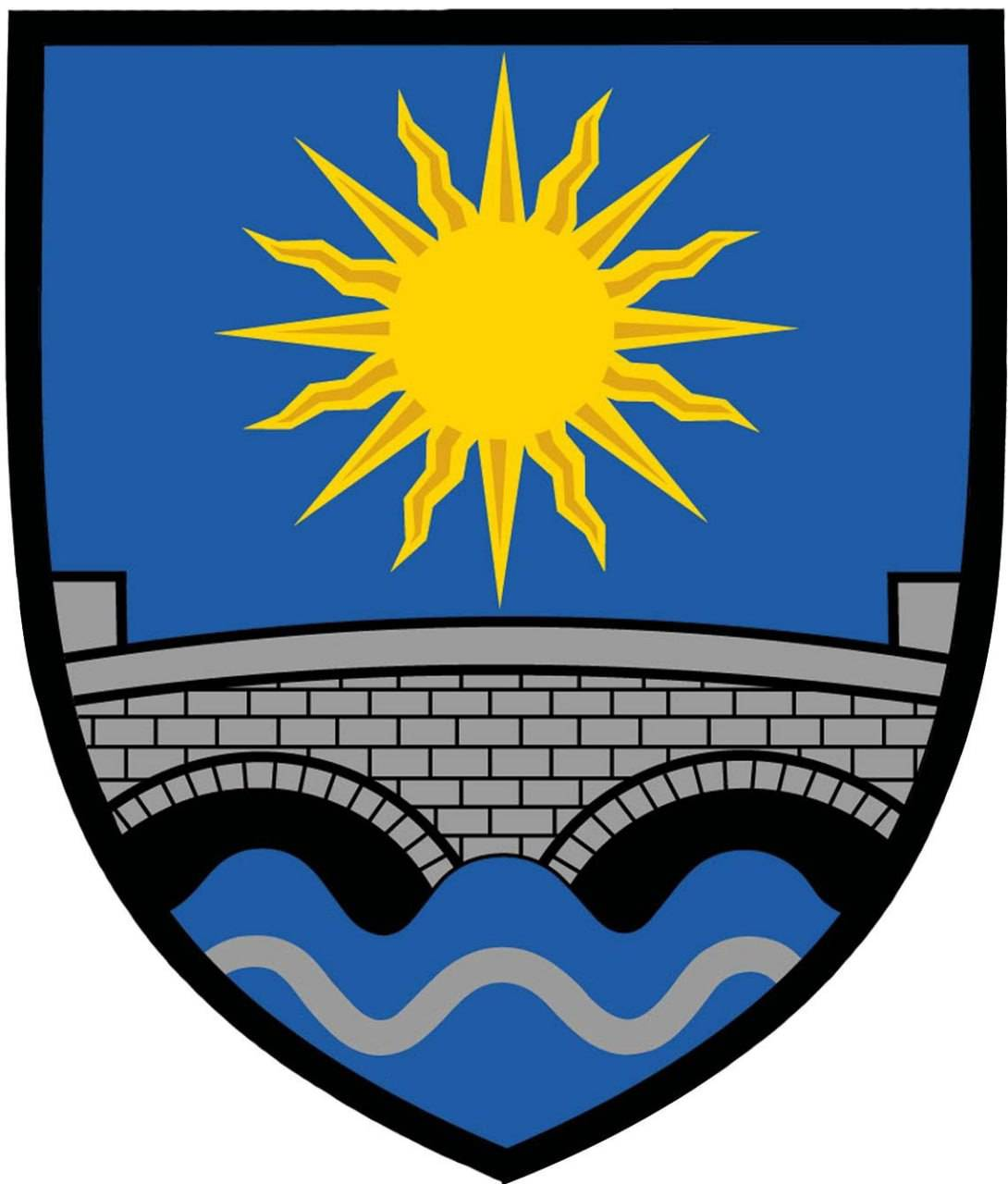
- Founded: April 3, 2022
- Country: Ukraine
- Allegiance: Armed Forces of Ukraine
- Branch: Support Forces
- Type: Brigade
- Role: Military engineering
- Size: 1500 - 5000
- Part of: Engineering Troops Directorate
- Garrison/HQ: Khmelnytskyi
- Engagements: Russo-Ukrainian War; Full scale invasion
- Website: Official Facebook site

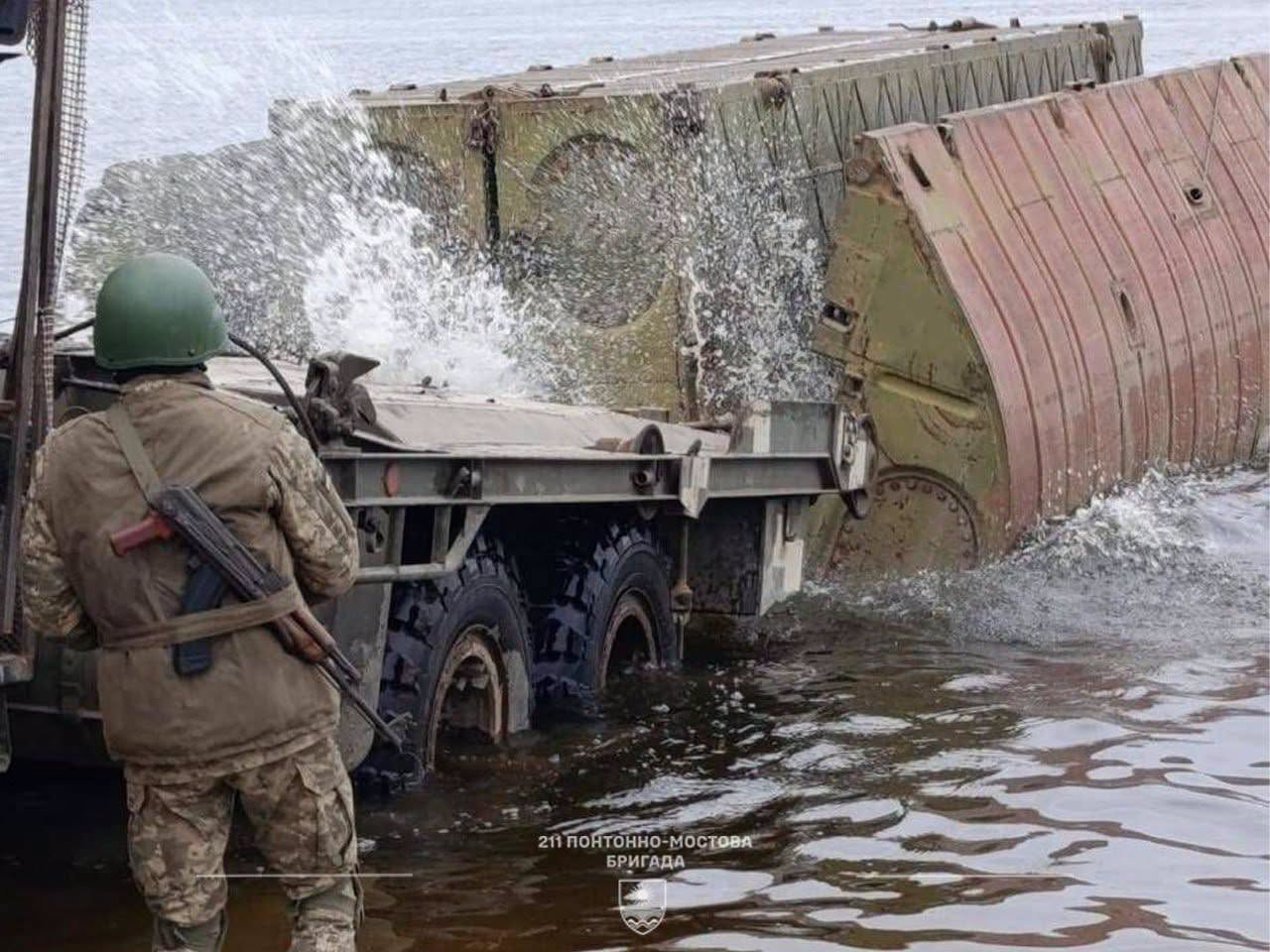
PMP pontoon bridge being deployed

The 211th Pontoon-Bridge Brigade (MUN A7147) is a brigade level military unit of the Ukrainian Support Forces of the Armed Forces of Ukraine. It was established as a regiment on 3 April 2022, but was expanded to a brigade in February 2024 and has seen action during the full scale invasion of Ukraine.

== History ==
The 211th Pontoon-Bridge Brigade was first established as the 210th Pontoon-Bridge Regiment on 3 April 2022 in Khmelnytskyi Oblast, on the basis of the 48th Engineering Brigade, later expanded to a brigade in February 2024.

In 2022, the brigade's battalions performed combat missions including the establishment and maintenance of Pontoon Bridges in Kherson Oblast, Mykolaiv Oblast, Donetsk Oblast, Poltava Oblast and Kharkiv Oblast. At the end of August 2022, pontoon crossings and false bridges were built by the regiment during the 2022 Kherson counteroffensive. At the end of 2022, it installed heavy mechanized bridges during the Battle of Bakhmut, saw combat during the Battle of Izium and in Kramatorsk, and restored damaged equipment in Mykolaiv Oblast. In March 2023, it established a crossing over the Ingulets River. Two soldiers of the brigade (Grigoriev Alexei Igorovich and Oleksandr Yuriyovych Misyura) were killed in combat on 21 November 2023 in Kherson Oblast as a result of a UAV strike. A soldier of the brigade (Tulaydan Yuri Yurievich) was killed as a result of a Russian missile attack on Poltava on 3 September 2024.

=== Controversy ===
The brigade's leadership has been accused of numerous family ties and corruption as well as abuse of authority, physical violence against servicemen, threats and extortion of money from soldiers. The brigade's servicemen were ordered to build a house in Khmelnytskyi for brigade commander Oleh Poberezhnyuk in 2023, although they were supposed to be undertaking combat duties. The platoon commander of the first battalion of the brigade and the son of the chief of staff, Vladyslav Pastukh, threatened, extorted money and physically abused the servicemen. Commander-in-Chief of the Armed Forces of Ukraine, launched an investigation into its commander's actions. On 17 December 2024, criminal proceedings were initiated against the brigade's officials with the pre-trial investigation being conducted by the Lviv Territorial Department of the State Bureau of Investigation. On 19 December 2024, brigade commander Oleh Poberezhnyuk was arrested and was released the next day when a bail of 900 thousand UAH was posted. Moreover, he was released of his duties as the brigade commander by the high command. On 29 December 2024, the State Bureau of Investigation searched Poberezhnyuk’s home. According to the investigation, he knew about torture and other incidents but did not intervene. He was taken to Kyiv, the same day. On 30 December, the brigade commander, Poberezhnyuk, was re-arrested, this time with a bail of 12.1 million UAH. The son of the brigade chief of staff, Vladyslav Pastukh, was also under suspicion and in May 2025, the investigation was completed which revealed him to be guilty of partaking in several crimes.

== Command ==
- Commanders: Colonel Poberezhnyuk Oleg Volodymyrovych (2022 — 2024)
- Chief of Staff: Lieutenant Colonel Valeriy Vasylevich Pastukh
