= 704th CBRN Protection Brigade (Ukraine) =

Ukrainian Ground Forces unit

704th CBRN Protection Brigade (2025–present) 704th CBRN Protection Regiment (2002–2025) 22nd Chemical Defense Brigade (19??–2002)
- 704-та бригада РХБЗ
- Active: 19?? - 2013; 2014 - present
- Country: Soviet Union (19??–1991); Ukraine (1992–present)
- Allegiance: Armed Forces of Ukraine
- Branch: Support Forces
- Type: Brigade
- Role: Chemical Corps
- Part of: CBRN Troops Directorate
- Garrison/HQ: Sambir, Lviv Oblast
- Engagements: Russo-Ukrainian War
- Website: Official Facebook site

Commanders
- Current commander: Colonel Yevhen Huska

Insignia
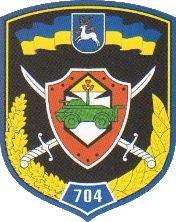
- Old Insignia

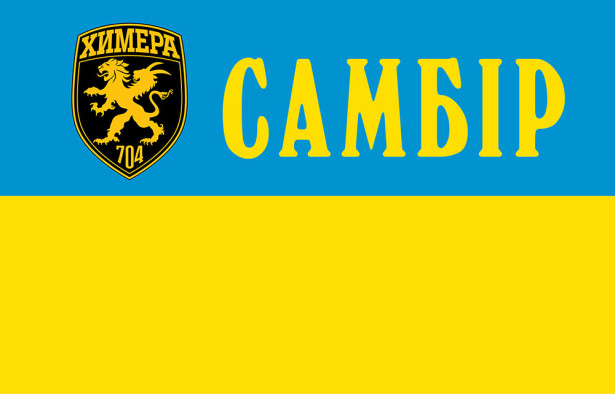
- Unit Flag

The 704th CBRN Protection Brigade (MUN A0807) is a brigade of the Ukrainian Support Forces of the Armed Forces of Ukraine. And the only separate formation of the Radiological, Chemical, and Biological Protection Troops within the Ground Forces of Ukraine.

== History ==
In 1992 when the Radiological, Chemical, and Biological Protection Troops within the Armed Forces of Ukraine were established, they numbered five brigades and 15 similar battalions of this type. All of the brigades and battalions apart from the 704th Detached Regiment were eventually disestablished.

In July 2007, the regiment was fulfilling the task on eliminating the consequences of the accident at the Ozhidiv-Krasne railway line of the Lviv Railway (uk:Фосфорна аварія під Ожидовом), where 15 tanks with yellow phosphorus were upturned.

The disbandment of the unit, as part of the reorganisation of the Ukrainian Army, started in 2013. The military property (machines, garages, hangars) was sold, and personnel dismissed or transferred to other units. In December 2013, the last 20 CRM-4 (Chemical Reconnaissance Machine) vehicles based on armored personnel carrier (BTR-80) were sent to Crimea. In total, there were about 50 of them in the Unit.

== Russo-Ukrainian war ==
With the beginning of the Russo-Ukrainian War in 2014, regiment personnel with machine guns and sapper shovels in their hands took part in the protection of the territorial integrity of Ukraine.

In June 2015, the 60th anniversary of the 704th Regiment of Radiological, Chemical and Biological Protection was celebrated.

As of 2017, the regiment is not considered a combat unit and participates in operations mostly on the second and third lines of defence.

== Structure ==
- 704th CBRN Protection Brigade
- Headquarters
  - 2nd Battalion of Radiological, Chemical and Biological Protection
  - 19th Detached Radiological, Chemical and Biological Protection Battalion
  - Flamethrower Battalion
  - Medical unit

== Losses ==
Losses of the regiment in battles in the Anti-Terrorist Operation Zone:

- On July 11, 2014, a soldier of the regiment Vovk Vasyl Yaroslavovych, was killed in an artillery attack near Zelenopillya.
- January 1, 2019, Sergeant Voitovich Oleg Stepanovich

== See also ==
- Use of chemical weapons during Russia's invasion of Ukraine
