= 70th Support Brigade =

70th Support Brigade (2024–present) 70th Support Regiment (2021–2024) 70th Engineering Support Center (2013–2021)
- 70 Окрема Бригада Підтримки
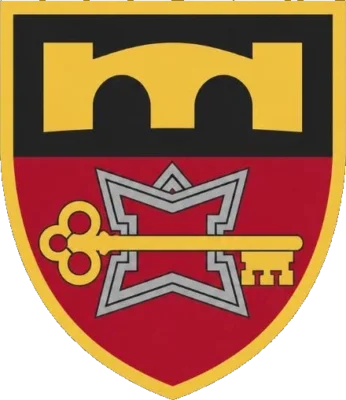
- Founded: November 2, 2013
- Country: Ukraine
- Allegiance: Armed Forces of Ukraine
- Branch: Support Forces
- Type: Brigade
- Role: Military engineering
- Part of: Engineering Troops Directorate
- Garrison/HQ: Bar, Vinnytsia Oblast
- Engagements: Russo-Ukrainian War; Full scale invasion
- Website: Official Facebook site

Commanders
- Current commander: Colonel Volodymyr Verykha

The 70th Separate Support Brigade (MUN A0853) is a brigade of the Ukrainian Support Forces of the Armed Forces of Ukraine, providing engineering, logistical and support services. It was established as a regiment, but was expanded to a brigade in April 2024 and has seen extensive action during the Russian invasion of Ukraine. It is headquartered at Bar.

== History ==
The regiment participated in the Rubizh 2016 exercises, from 5–25 October in the Kherson Oblast. On 6 December 2021, the regiment was awarded a battle banner.

The brigade took part in the Russian invasion of Ukraine from its start. During the Battle of Irpin, it successfully blew up a bridge to block the passage of a Russian convoy following which it's barrier Platoon was attacked by Russian forces killing an officer, Kvasny Zakhar Andriyovych along with a soldier, Shymansky Roman Volodymyrovych. On 28 April 2022, two soldiers of the regiment, Drozdov Serhiy Anatolyevich and Kucheruk Oleksiy Oleksandrovych were killed in combat during the Battle of Izium. On 2 November 2022, the Regiment celebrated its anniversary. On 11 October 2023, an officer of the regiment, Vladislav Eduardovich was killed by Russian mortar strikes near Yampil. On 27 January 2024, a soldier of the regiment (Navertyuk Viktor Mykolayovych) was killed in action. In April 2024, it was expanded from a regiment to a brigade. The brigade celebrated its anniversary again in November 2024. In March 2025, equipment including 16 robotic platforms "Targan", 8 NRC "Termit", 7 pickup trucks, 4 trailers, 4 Vampire drones, 25 radio stations, 24 copters, a maintenance workshop, EW and backup power were transferred to the brigade. In April 2025, it was seeing combat on the frontlines.

== Commanders ==
- Colonel Oleg Stanislavovich Preditkevych (2016–2021)
- Colonel Veryga Volodymyr Vasylyovych (Since 2021)
