= Military Police (Ukraine) =

Ukrainian Military Police
- Військова служба правопорядку
- Military Police branch insignia
- Active: May 19, 2002
- Country: Ukraine
- Type: Military Police
- Size: 1,753 (2005)
- Anniversaries: May 19

Commanders
- Current commander: Major General Vitalii Levchenko

Insignia
- Sleeve Patch

- Collar insignia

The Ukrainian Military Law-Enforcement Service (VSP) (Ukrainian: Військова служба правопорядку у Збройних Силах України (ВСП)) is the military police of the Ukrainian Armed Forces.

== History ==
The VSP was formed on May 19, 2002.

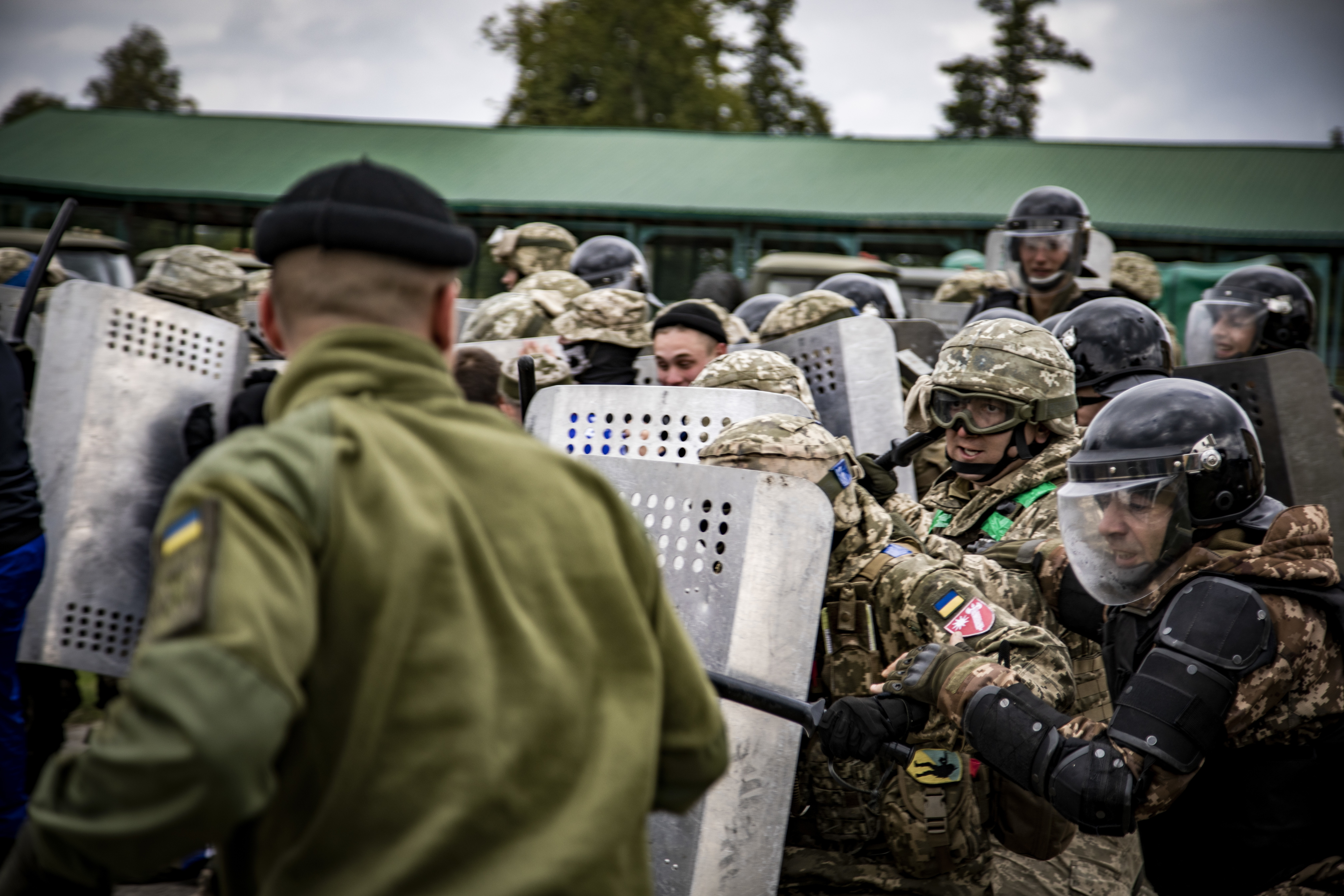
Ukrainian Military Police train in riot control tactics

On August 21, 2023, a proposal was raised to create a VSP unit that would maintain discipline in the Ukrainian military and stop war crimes, which would be under the Ukrainian Ministry of Defense.

On June 19, 2024, Bill No. 6569-d was proposed to expand VSP powers with operational and investigative capabilities, including the authority to carry out checks and vehicle inspections while detaining individuals suspected of criminal activity, as well as the right to temporarily restrict pedestrian and vehicle movement on certain roadways during emergencies or criminal apprehension.

=== International missions ===
==== Iraq (2003–2005) ====
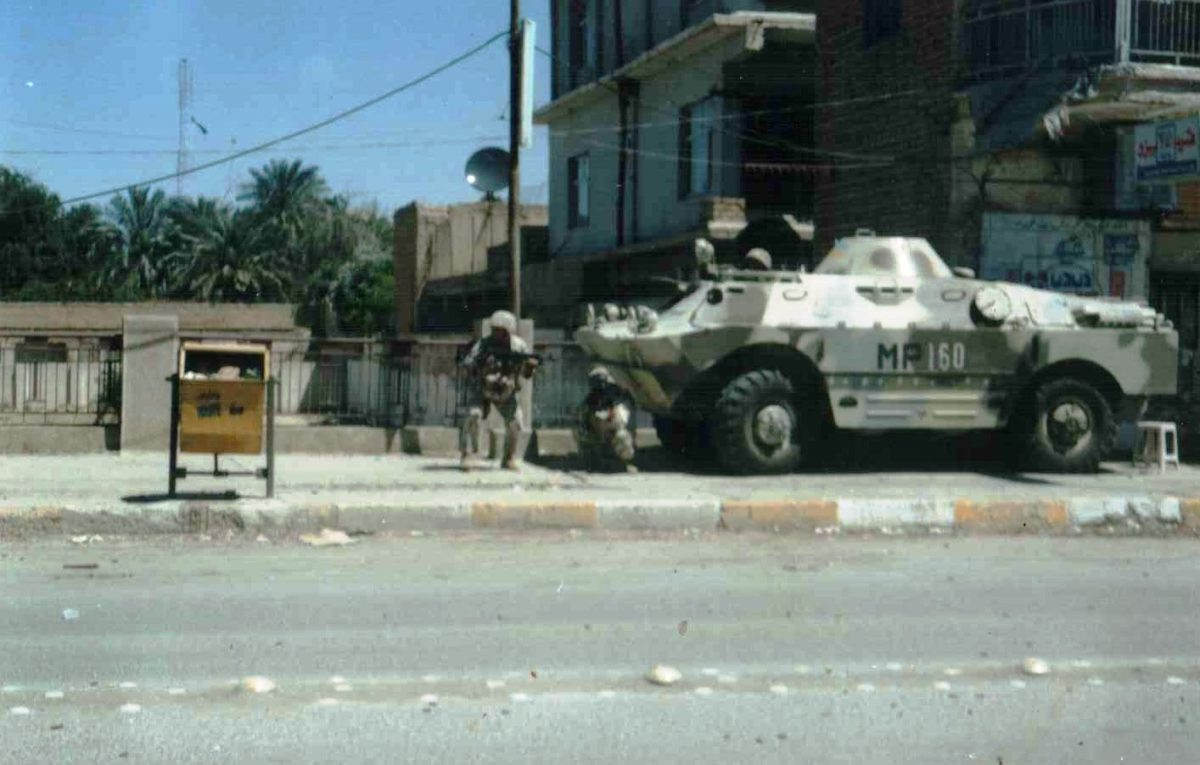
BRDM-2 of the Military Police of Ukraine at the Iraq War

Members of the VSP were assigned to each of the four Ukrainian contingents, while they were stationed in the province of Wasit, Iraq.

== Structure ==
Main Directorate of the Military Police (MU А0880), Kyiv

- Counterincursion and Counterterror Department (Відділ протидії диверсіям та терористичним актам)

directly reporting:

- 93rd MP Battalion (MU А2424), Kyiv
- 138th Special Purpose Center (Counterincursion and Counterterror) 'Knyaz Volodymyr Svyatoslavych' (MU А0952), Vasylkiv, Kyiv Oblast
- 307th Disciplinary Battalion of the VPS (MU А0488), Kyiv
- 25th Military Police Training Center (MU А1666), Lviv, Lviv Oblast

Territorial forces:

Central Directorate (direct responsibility over Kyiv and Kyiv Oblast) (MU А2100), Kyiv

- Bila Tserkva Zonal Office, Bila Tserkva, Kyiv Oblast
- Zhytomyr Zonal Unit (AOR: Zhytomyr Oblast), Zhytomyr, Zhytomyr Oblast
  - Novohrad-Volynsky Office
- Poltava Zonal Unit (AOR: Poltava and Sumy Oblasts), Poltava, Poltava Oblast
  - Sumy Zonal Office
  - Konotop MP Battalion
- Cherkasy Zonal Unit (AOR: Cherkasy Oblast), Cherkasy, Cherkasy Oblast
  - Uman MP Group Uman, Cherkasy Oblast
- Chernihiv Zonal Unit (AOR: Chernihiv Oblast), Chernihiv, Chernihiv Oblast
  - Desna MP Group, Desna, Chernihiv Oblast

Western Territorial Directorate (direct responsibility over Lviv Oblast) (MU А0583), Lviv, Lviv Oblast

- Special Purpose Unit
- Yavoriv Zonal Office
- 3rd Special Unit (MU А2736), Lviv, Lviv Oblast
- Rivne Zonal Unit (AOR: Rivne and Volyn Oblasts), Rivne, Rivne Oblast
  - Volodymyr-Volynskyi Zonal Office
- Ternopil Zonal Unit (AOR: Ternopil and Ivano-Frankivsk Oblasts), Ternopil, Ternopil Oblast
  - Ivano-Frankivsk Zonal Office
- Uzhhorod Zonal Unit (AOR: Zakarpattia Oblast), Uzhhorod
  - Mukachevo Zonal Office
- Khmelnytskyi Zonal Unit (AOR: Khmelnytskyi Oblast), Khmelnytskyi, Khmelnytskyi Oblast

Southern Territorial Directorate (direct responsibility over Odesa Oblast) (MU А1495), Odesa, Odesa Oblast

- Special Purpose Unit
- Ukrainian Military Law-Enforcement Service Office Bilhorod-Dnistrovskyi
- Vinnytsia Zonal Unit (AOR: Vinnytsia Oblast), Vinnytsia, Vinnytsia Oblast
  - Special Purpose Office
- Mykolaiv Zonal Unit (AOR: Mykolaiv and Kirovohrad Oblast), Mykolaiv, Mykolaiv Oblast
  - Kirovohrad Zonal Office
- Kherson Zonal Unit (AOR: Kherson Oblast), Kherson, Kherson Oblast

Eastern Territorial Directorate (direct responsibility over Dnipropetrovsk Oblast) (MU А2256), Dnipro, Dnipropetrovsk Oblast

- Kryvyi Rih Zonal Office
- VSP Office Cherkasy
- Special Unit 'Sarmat' (MU А2176), Zaporizhzhia, Zaporizhzhia Oblast
- Donetsk Zonal Unit (AOR: Donetsk Oblast), Kramatorsk, Donetsk Oblast
- Zaporizhzhia Zonal Unit (AOR: Zaporizhzhia Oblast), Zaporizhzhia, Zaporizhzhia Oblast
- Luhansk Zonal Unit (AOR: Luhansk Oblast), Severodonetsk, Luhansk Oblast
- Kharkiv Zonal Unit (AOR: Kharkiv Oblast), Kharkiv, Kharkiv Oblast
  - Chuhuiv Office
