= Use of chemical weapons during Russia's invasion of Ukraine =

The use of chemical weapons during Russia's invasion of Ukraine
- Part of the Russo-Ukrainian War
- Location: Ukraine
- Date: 25 February 2022 – present (4 years, 7 months and 12 days)
- Executed by: Russian Armed Forces
- Casualties: 3+

Since 2022, reports have emerged about Russians using chemical weapons in their invasion of Ukraine, these reports were subsequently confirmed multiple times. Such use is prohibited by the first article of the Chemical Weapons Convention.

== Timeline ==
Reports of Russian forces using chemical weapons appeared at least as early as November 2022. In 2023, the use of "caustic and flammable gas" was reported, and the total number of chemical attacks by the Russian army reached 465. In the same year, 2023, the Russian 810th Marine Brigade claimed to have used tear gas in K-51 grenades from drones against Ukrainian defenders.

On May 2, 2024, the U.S. State Department accused Russia of violating the ban on chemical weapons use during the invasion of Ukraine. According to U.S. statements, Russians used chloropicrin. According to intelligence data, these were not isolated cases.

In November 2024, the Organisation for the Prohibition of Chemical Weapons (OPCW) acknowledged the use of "toxic chemical substances" by Russians against Ukraine and confirmed violations of international law. In February 2025, in a second report, the organization again acknowledged Russia's use of chemical weapons. In June 2025, the organization for the third time confirmed violations of international law and the use of tear gas, which Russians call "Siren". According to OPCW data:

Analyses conducted separately and independently by OPCW-designated laboratories confirm that all grenades collected from dugouts at the observation post and rest position contained the riot control agent CS, CS-related compounds, and/or their breakdown products; soil and vegetation collected from locations where grenades were found also contained CS, its precursors and/or breakdown products; and a soil sample collected approximately 15 meters from one of the grenades at the incident site, as well as a solvent sample from the FPV drone debris frame also contained CS in very low quantities.

On May 6, 2025, the Council of the European Union in another sanctions package officially made accusations against Russia for the first time regarding the use of tear gas during its war against Ukraine.

On July 4, 2025, new facts emerged about Russia's use of chemical weapons during the Russian invasion of Ukraine, indicating an intensification of its use. According to statements from two Dutch special services (military intelligence MIVD and intelligence and security service AIVD), evidence was found of increased active use of prohibited chemical weapons by Russia during the attack on Ukraine. Russian armed forces, according to the special services, used suffocating agents against Ukraine that were used by Hitler's troops.

According to data from three intelligence services: BND, MIVD and AIVD, Russian forces actively support the use of substances prohibited by the Geneva Conventions. Moreover, Russians are increasing funding for their chemical weapons program. According to information from Ukraine's Ministry of Defense, Russians have used chemical weapons more than 9,000 times during their attempts to occupy Ukraine, and cases of deaths from such use have been documented.

== Examples of use ==
Russian forces use prohibited weapons both in grenades and in Iranian Shahed drones (which they call Geran) that they send to Ukraine.

In particular, in 2023 in Krynky, Russians dropped tear gas in K-51 grenades from drones.

In 2024, gas was used in Dnipropetrovsk region near the villages of Illinka and Marievka. This was confirmed by the discovery of gas traces in both soil and water; interviews with military personnel, discovery of RG-VO hand grenades, and Russian channel RT showing military use of these grenades.

In 2025, Main Directorate of Intelligence of Ukraine reported the use of chemical weapons near Shcherbaky in Zaporizhzhia region.

== See also ==
- War crimes in the Russian invasion of Ukraine
- Russian strikes against Ukrainian infrastructure (2022–present)
- Allegations of genocide of Ukrainians in the Russo-Ukrainian War
- Casualties of the Russo-Ukrainian War
- Russian war crimes
- War crimes in Donbas
