= 138th Special Purpose Center =

- 138-й центр спеціального призначення
- Active: 11 July 2006 – present
- Country: Ukraine
- Allegiance: Armed Forces of Ukraine
- Branch: Military Police
- Type: Military Police
- Role: Special forces
- Size: Battalion
- Part of: Military Police Headquarters
- Garrison/HQ: Vasylkiv, Kyiv Oblast
- Patron: Volodymyr Sviatoslavych
- Mottos: By Faith And Iron, The Holy Land Is Safe
- Engagements: Russo-Ukrainian War: War in Donbas; Full Scale Invasion; Kupiansk offensive
- Decorations: For Courage and Bravery
- Website: Official Facebook page

Commanders
- Current commander: Colonel Ivan Orlov

The 138th Special Purpose Center for Countering Sabotage and Terrorist Attacks named after Prince Volodymyr Sviatoslavych (MUN A0952) is a special operations unit of the Ukrainian Military Police.

== History ==
Operator of the Special Purpose Center

The 138th Special Purpose Center was founded on 11 July 2006 as special forces unit of the military police for counter sabotage and terrorism.

=== Russo-Ukrainian War ===
As early as April 2014 the unit was involved in the War in Donbass, conducting counter sabotage missions in Donetsk Oblast. From 2014 onward until 2021 the unit repeatedly operated in eastern Ukraine. During this period the unit suffered no casualties according to a former commander, Colonel Bohdan Stolyarchuk.

On the occasion of the 30th anniversary of Ukraine's independence president Volodymyr Zelenskyy awarded the center the honorary title named after Prince Volodymyr Sviatoslavych on 23 August 2021.

Full Scale Invasion

Since the beginning of the Full Scale Invasion the unit has been in constant combat operations.

On 6 December 2022 the unit received the honorary award For Courage and Bravery by president Zelenskyy.

In late 2025 the Special Purpose Center has been active around Kupiansk, conducting counterattacks, clearing operations and hunting down Russian saboteurs in the city.

== Commanders ==
- Oleksandr Borysovsky (2013 — February 2020)
- Colonel Bohdan Stolyarchuk (February 2020 — August 2024)
- Hennady Holovin (August 2024 — June 2025)
- Colonel Ivan Orlov (June 2025)

== See also ==
- DOZOR
- KORD
- Omega
