= 48th Engineering Brigade =

- 48-ма інженерна бригада
- Founded: November 2015
- Country: Ukraine
- Allegiance: Armed Forces of Ukraine
- Branch: Support Forces
- Type: Brigade
- Role: Military engineering
- Size: 1500 - 5000
- Part of: Engineering Troops Directorate
- Garrison/HQ: Kamianets-Podilskyi, Khmelnytskyi Oblast
- Nickname: Kamianets-Podilskyi
- Engagements: Russo-Ukrainian War; Russian invasion of Ukraine
- Decorations: For Courage and Bravery
- Website: Official Facebook site

Commanders
- Current commander: Colonel Oleksandr Reka

The 48th Engineering Brigade Kamianets-Podilskyi (MUN A2738, post:B1527) is a brigade level unit of the Ukrainian Support Forces, which was established in 2015 in Kamianets-Podilskyi on the basis of the 11th Engineering Battalion, which was engaged in combat during the War in Donbass. The brigade comprises several engineering battalions, including the 308th, 309th, 310th, 311th and 321st battalions, and was the only engineering brigade of the Ukrainian Support Forces for some time.

== History ==
The 11th Engineering Battalion was established on 3 September 2012 on the basis of the Faculty of Military Training of the I. Ohienko Kyiv National University.

The 11th battalion had been involved in the War in Donbass from day one. In Shchastia, the battalion established a 120-meter bridge over the Seversky Donets to transport an entire artillery battery in one trip. It deployed pontoon crossings with a carrying capacity of 60 tons ranging from 119 to 350m in length, as well as 15 ferry crossings with a carrying capacity of 60 tons in 10–20 minutes and 5 other crossings with a carrying capacity of 170 tons and also an amphibious crossing. The 311th battalion was established on 8 October 2014. Another battalion, the 308th was established in October 2014 and celebrated its anniversary on 12 October 2015 while deployed in the ATO zone. A soldier of the 310th battalion (Kovshar Dmytro Serhiyovych) was killed on 4 July 2015. A soldier of the 309th battalion (Basarab Oleg Vasilyevich) was killed in action on 20 September 2015. On 30 November 2015, the 48th Engineer Brigade was established in Kamianets-Podilskyi with a strength of about 2,500 servicemen on the basis of 11th battalion and was headquartered at the former 275th Rogachev-Tallinn Arms and Equipment Storage Base. Other engineering units including the 308th, 309th, 310th and 311th battalions became a part of the brigade. As of March 2016, the 308th battalion of the 48th brigade had fortified over 30 forward positions including Avdiivka, Butovka, Svitlodarsk, Dzerzhynsk, Luhansk, Toretsk and Popasna. According to the 308th battalion commander, Colonel Leonid Matveyev, the unit and carried out combat orders for a year and half without rotation. In July 2016, during the exercise "Southern Wind - 2016", the 11th battalion of the 48th brigade, together with the 808th Pontoon Bridge Regiment and the 70th Engineering Support Center, built four pontoon crossings over the rivers: Berezan, Southern Bug, Ingul and Dnipro, including two crossings at night, one near Zatoka with a length of 320m and a carrying capacity of 60 tons, and a ferry near the Antonivka transporting 82 units of equipment including armored vehicles. During the Rubizh-2016 exercises, the 11th Separate Pontoon-Bridge Battalion of the 48th Brigade built a 560-meter-long pontoon-bridge crossing across the Dnieper near Kherson, transporting 500 personnel and about 300 pieces of equipment. A soldier of the 310th battalion (Melnyk Ivan Ivanovych) was killed on 14 March 2016 along with a soldier of the 321st battalion (Andriy Anatolyovich Kuhar) near Bakhmut. A soldier of the 311th battalion (Boroniak Mykola Mykhailovych) was killed on 18 March 2016 and another (Merenkov Viktor Eduardovich) on 14 May 2016. As of November 2016, half of the battalions were deployed in Kamianets-Podilskyi and performed tasks in the ATO zone on rotations, while the 309th, 310th and 311th battalions had been continuously performing tasks for over two years without rotation. The 308th battalion was transferred to the JFO zone after 2016 performing rear support functions like building fortifications and firing positions, dug trenches and dugouts and was also involved in the reconstruction of schools and kindergartens. However, sometimes its forces came under artillery firing destroying the newly built structures and equipment. The brigade's deputy commander, Colonel Oleksandr Mykolayovych Parovyi died on 26 July 2017. On 23 August 2017, the brigade was awarded the honorary name Kamianets-Podilskyi and on 24 August 2017, the President of Ukraine Petro Poroshenko presented the brigade with a battle banner. The 311th battalion continued performing its tasks in the south of Donetsk Oblast, near Mariupol until November 2017. A soldier of the 310th battalion (Stankov Viktor Vasilyevich) was killed in action on 29 December 2017. On 28 April 2018, Kostyantyn Serhiyovych Parshenko, a soldier of the 11th battalion of the 48th Engineering brigade was killed near Novoaydar while performing his duties. During the 2018 deployment of the 309th battalion, two soldiers of the battalion (Luzhetskyi Volodymyr Mykolayovych and Blinchuk Bohdan Volodymyrovych) were killed on 8 and 29 July 2018. On 27 February 2019, a serviceman of the 48th Brigade (Oleksiy) was killed in action.

Following the Russian invasion of Ukraine, the brigade saw combat. On 24 February 2022, at the start of invasion a soldier of the brigade (Yevgeny Oleksandrovych Vyslovsky) was killed by a Russian strike in Kherson Oblast near Oleshki. Its forces also met the Russian invasion of Ukraine on the front line in the Donetsk Oblast destroying more than 20 pieces of equipment using engineering barriers installed by his unit in just the first four months. It took part in the 2022 Kherson counteroffensive and on 4 August 2022, while performing a combat mission near Bilohyrka, a soldier of the brigade (Mysak Vasyl Igorovych) was killed by Russian artillery fire while providing medical assistance to a wounded soldier. The 321st battalion of the brigade took part in the Battle of Bakhmut and a soldier of the 321st battalion (Borshulyak Oleksandr Volodymyrovych) was killed on 4 July 2023 while performing a combat mission near Ivanovske.

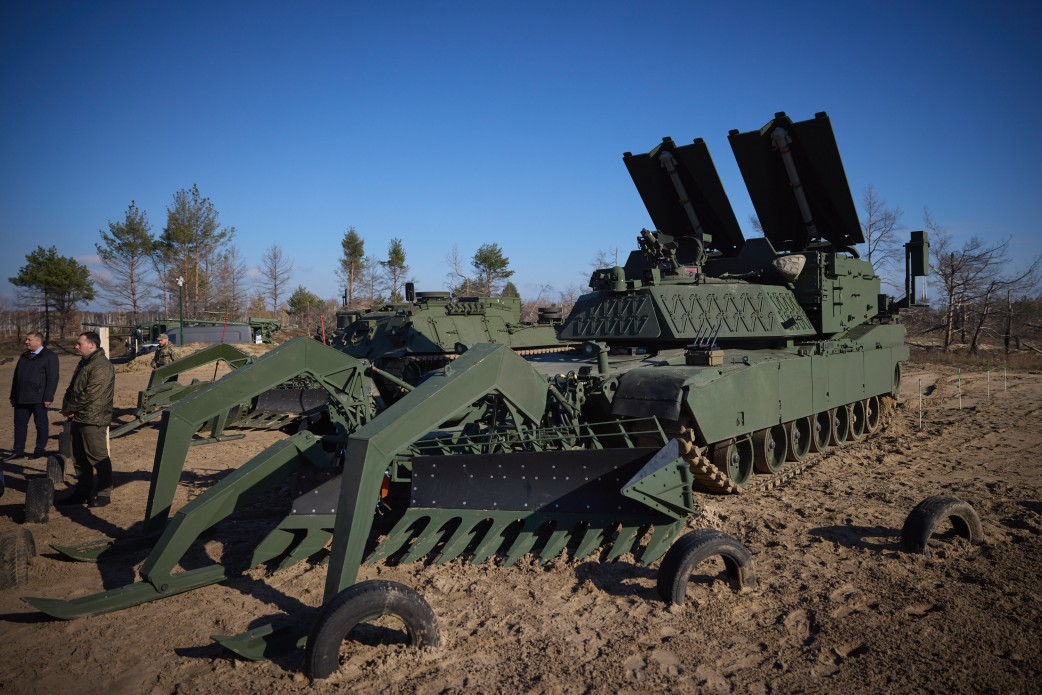
Ukrainian M1150 (front) and M88 at the award ceremony

On 3 November 2023, Rocket Forces and Artillery and the Engineering Troops Day, the brigade was awarded the honorary award For Courage and Bravery by the President of Ukraine Volodymyr Zelenskyy, together with the 808th Support Brigade.

On 7 November 2023, 16 kits each including a pickup truck, Autel EVO Nano+ quadcopter, a tablet, 3 Motorola radios, personal and group mine clearance kits, a metal detector, a blasting unit with a charger, an ohmmeter, probes, sappers kits and 2 coils of wire was transferred to the brigade. On 23 February 2024, it struck a Russian stronghold using the UR-77 Meteorite system. It took part in the 2024 Kharkiv offensive and on 19 June 2024, while taking part in combat near Ivanivka, a soldier of the brigade (Golos Konstantin Anatolyevich) was killed. It took part in the 2024 Kursk offensive from the first days conducting mine clearance duties and other engineering tasks. In July 2024, five Locker automobile workshops were crowdfunded and transferred to the 48th Engineer Brigade.

== Structure ==
- Management & Headquarters
- 11th Separate Pontoon-Bridge Battalion (MUN A3290), Kamianets-Podilskyi
- 308th Separate Engineering and Technical Support Battalion (MUN B1423), Kamianets-Podilskyi
- 309th Separate Engineering and Technical Support Battalion (MUN B1527), Sambir
- 310th Separate Engineering and Technical Support Battalion (MUN A4568, B1579), Olshanytsia
- 311th Separate Engineering and Technical Support Battalion (MUN B1719), Mukachevo
- 321st Separate Engineering Battalion (MUN A3479), Kamianets-Podilskyi
- 1230th Separate Engineering and Technical Support Battalion
- Assault and clearance squad
- Commandant Platoon
- Support Units

== Commanders ==
- Lieutenant Colonel Korshok Viktor Mykolayovych (2015–2018)
- Colonel Reka Oleksandr Vasylyovych (2018-)

== Sources ==
- "На Хмельниччині військові понтонери переправляли техніку і особовий склад через річку Дністер". www.mil.gov.ua. Міністерство оборони України. 2018-05-31.
