= 143rd Joint Training Center =

143rd Joint Training Center (2024–present) Demining Center (2001–2020)
- 143-й Об'єднаний навчальний центр
- Founded: 2020
- Country: Ukraine
- Allegiance: Armed Forces of Ukraine
- Branch: Support Forces
- Type: Military engineering
- Role: Training of military engineers
- Size: Brigade
- Part of: Support Forces Command
- Garrison/HQ: Kamianets-Podilskyi, Khmelnytskyi Oblast
- Nickname: Podillia
- Engagements: Russo-Ukrainian War; Full scale invasion
- Website: Official Facebook site

Commanders
- Current commander: Colonel Volodymyr Rodikov

The 143rd Joint Training Center Podillia (MUN A2641) is a training institution of the Ukrainian Support Forces of the Armed Forces of Ukraine, training new personal for engineering, logistical and support services.

== History ==
The 143rd Center is mainly based on the Demining Center.

In 2001, the Demining Center was established as a structural unit of the Military Engineering Institute to train specialists for humanitarian demining both in Ukraine and abroad, in particular in Southern Lebanon. Its main task was to train personnel in accordance with international standards.

In 2007, the it was reorganized into a separate military unit, which was an important step in the development of the training of sappers and engineering specialists for the Armed Forces. Over the following years, the Center accumulated experience and strengthened its capabilities, preparing specialists for participation in peacekeeping missions and internal operations.

In the fall of 2020 the Demining Center merged with the 201st Training Center of the Support Forces Command, resulting in the formation of the 143rd Joint Training Center.

On 6 December 2021 a battle flag was presented to the unit by the Chief of the General Staff of the Armed Forces, Lieutenant General Serhiy Shaptala.

=== Russo-Ukrainian war ===
The Center's team took part in the defense of Ukraine in 2022 from the first hours on. In particular, the combined demining detachment, preventing the loss of personnel during the first air and missile strikes on the areas of concentration and defense of Ukrainian troops, prepared a number of key military infrastructure facilities for destruction (by the method of controlled explosion) on the morning of February 24. Subsequently, the main efforts of the demining groups in the area of operations was the support of ground and airborne assault forces practically along the Izium, Lyman, Sievierodonetsk, and Popasna directions.

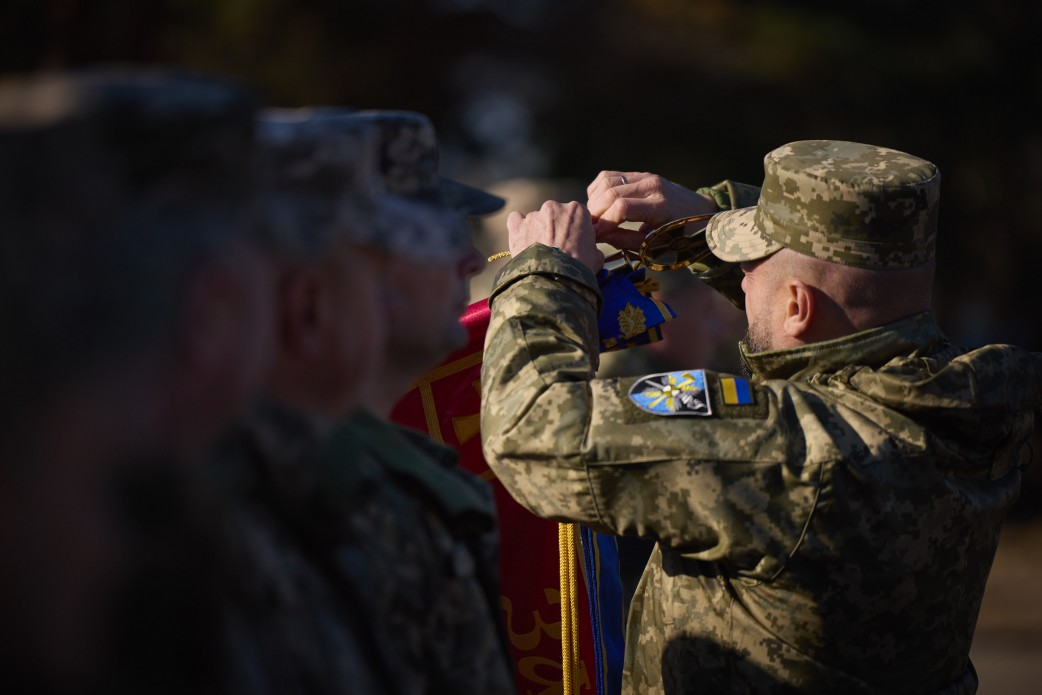
Honoary title ribbon added to the battle flag

During the first days of the enemy offensive from the north, the combined units of the Center set out to conduct preparations for the defense of Kyiv. The sappers were assigned tasks of engineering reconnaissance, the laying of minefields and the destruction of critical infrastructure.

Also, servicemen of the unit performed tasks as assigned in the Zaporizhia, Kherson, Kharkiv, and Izyum directions. At the same time, sappers were involved in demining areas and objects in the deoccupied territories, in particular, in the Kharkiv and Kherson Oblasts.

On 29 September 2023 the unit was awarded the honorary title Podillia.

== Commanders ==
- Colonel Volodymyr Rodikov (since 2020)
