= 47th Engineering Brigade =

- 47-ма окрема інженерна бригада
- Founded: January 2019
- Country: Ukraine
- Allegiance: Armed Forces of Ukraine
- Branch: Support Forces
- Type: Brigade
- Role: Military engineering
- Part of: Engineering Troops Directorate
- Garrison/HQ: Dubno, Rivne Oblast
- Motto: Let's preserve honor - let's build glory
- Engagements: Russo-Ukrainian War; Russian invasion of Ukraine
- Decorations: For Courage and Bravery
- Website: Official Facebook site

Commanders
- Current commander: Colonel Oleksandr Tomashevskyi

Insignia
- Field Insignia

The 47th Separate Engineering Brigade (MUN A2755) is a military unit of the Ukrainian Support Forces which was established in 2019 and has taken part during both the War in Donbass and the Russian invasion of Ukraine, conducting a variety of combat engineering tasks.

== History ==
On 2 January 2019, the brigade was established composed of two separate battalions on the basis of the 107th Road Support Center, which itself was established on 1 September 1986 as part of the Soviet Armed Forces in Dubno and was converted into a Pontoon bridge unit on 1 June 1993. The main tasks of the brigade were to organize road commandant service, repair and construction of roads, arrange pontoon crossings and bridges, escort convoys among other tasks. In September 2020, it was converted form a road commandant brigade into an engineering brigade. The brigade was constantly involved in operations in the ATO zone to protect and defend important facilities in the Donetsk and Luhansk Oblasts, provide commandant duty and pontoon-bridge crossings. On 17 July 2021, a foundation was laid at the brigade's headquarters for the construction of the Church of the Pochaev Icon of the Mother of God. The cornerstone was consecrated by Archbishop Hilarion of Rivne and Ostroh. On 5 August 2021, a soldier of the brigade (Oleksandr Volodymyrovych Tsybulsky) was killed in action.

The brigade saw action during the Russian invasion of Ukraine. The brigade's church was consecrated and opened to the brigade's servicemen on 5 August 2022. On 13 September 2022, a soldier of the brigade (Petro Fedorovych Mykolaychik) was killed during a missile strike on the brigade's near Lozova in Kharkiv Oblast. A soldier of the brigade (Oleksandr Stakhnyuk) was killed by mortar shelling in Tonenke on 18 December 2022. On 19 April 2023, the brigade was visited by Epiphanius of Kyiv, the primate of the Orthodox Church of Ukraine who presented the brigade with the "Medal of the Holy Great Martyr George the Victorious". On 13 November 2023, a soldier of the brigade (Roman Franekovich Meleshchuk) was killed while performing a combat mission in the Klishchiivka. On 1 October 2024, it received a battle flag. On 16 December 2024, an officer of the brigade (Oleg Mykhailovych Dovgal) was killed in action. In March 2025, an unmanned systems company was created in the brigade armed with 8 TerMIT logistics and demining ground drones, 16 Targan ground drones, 4 Vampire UAVs, DJI Mavic 3 drones, 7 SUVs with open luggage compartments and a mobile maintenance and repairs workshop as well as radios, radio-electronic jamming stations, repeaters and other such equipment.

On 28 June 2025, Constitution Day, the unit was awarded the Presidential Award For Courage and Bravery by the President of Ukraine Volodymyr Zelenskyy.

== Structure ==
The structure of the brigade is as follows:

- 47th Engineering Brigade
  - Management & Headquarters
  - 301st Engineering Support Battalion
  - 304th Engineering Support Battalion
  - Engineering sapper battalion
  - Unmanned Systems Company
  - Support units

== Commanders ==
- Colonel Vasiliev Ivan Vasilyevich (?-?)
- Colonel Yevhen Pichura (2019–2021)
- Colonel Oleksandr Tomashevsky (2021-)
