= 49th Demining Brigade =

Ukrainian Brigade

49th Demining Brigade (October –present) 49th Assault Engineering Brigade (June 2024–October 2024)
- 49-та окрема бригада розмінування
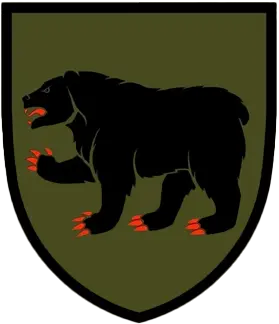
- Active: 2024 – present
- Country: Ukraine
- Allegiance: Armed Forces of Ukraine
- Branch: Support Forces
- Type: Brigade
- Role: Military engineering
- Part of: Engineering Troops Directorate
- Engagements: Russo-Ukrainian War
- Website: Official Facebook site

Insignia
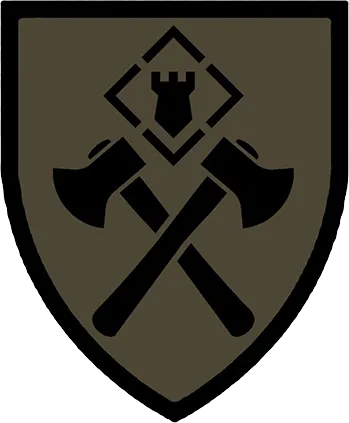
- Insignia of the 49th Assault Engineering Brigade

The 49th Separate Demining Brigade is a brigade of the Ukrainian Support Forces.

== History ==
This brigade is the first of its kind in the Ukrainian Armed Forces, as only traditional engineering brigades have existed until now. The existence of the brigade was revealed by the Ukrainian recruitment server LobbyX.

== Structure ==
- 49th Demining Brigade
- Headquarter
  - 315th Engineer Assault Battalion
  - 1st Engineer Sapper Battalion
