= Support Forces of the Armed Forces of Ukraine =

- Сили підтримки Збройних Сил України
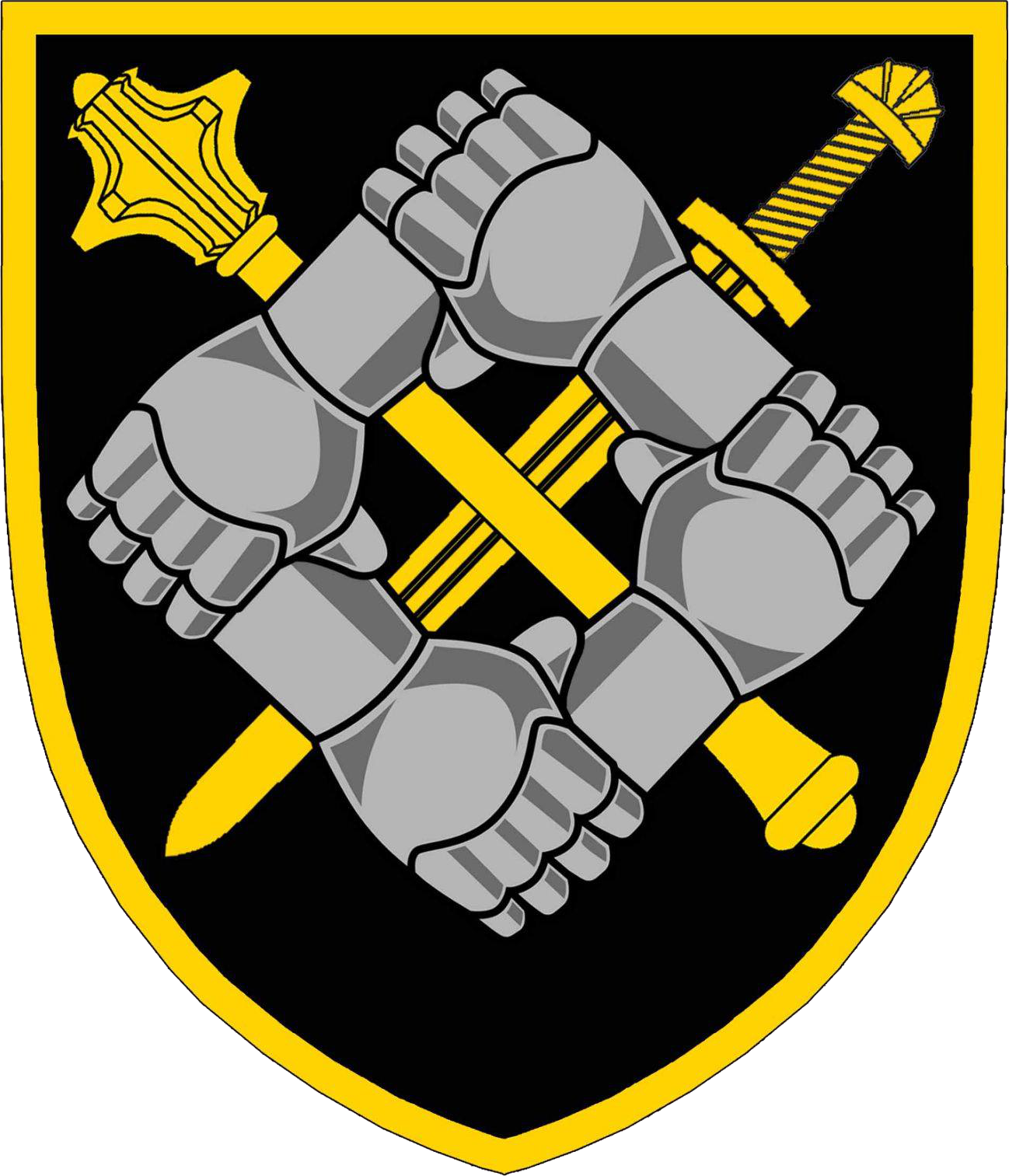
- Insignia of the Support Forces Command
- Founded: February 5th 2020
- Country: Ukraine
- Type: Military branch
- Role: Military engineering CBRN defense Military meteorology Military Topography and Navigation
- Part of: Armed Forces of Ukraine
- Garrison/HQ: Kyiv
- Engagements: Russo-Ukrainian War
- Website: Official Facebook site

Commanders
- Current commander: Major General Dmytro Herega

Insignia
- Shoulder sleeve insignia of the engineering troops

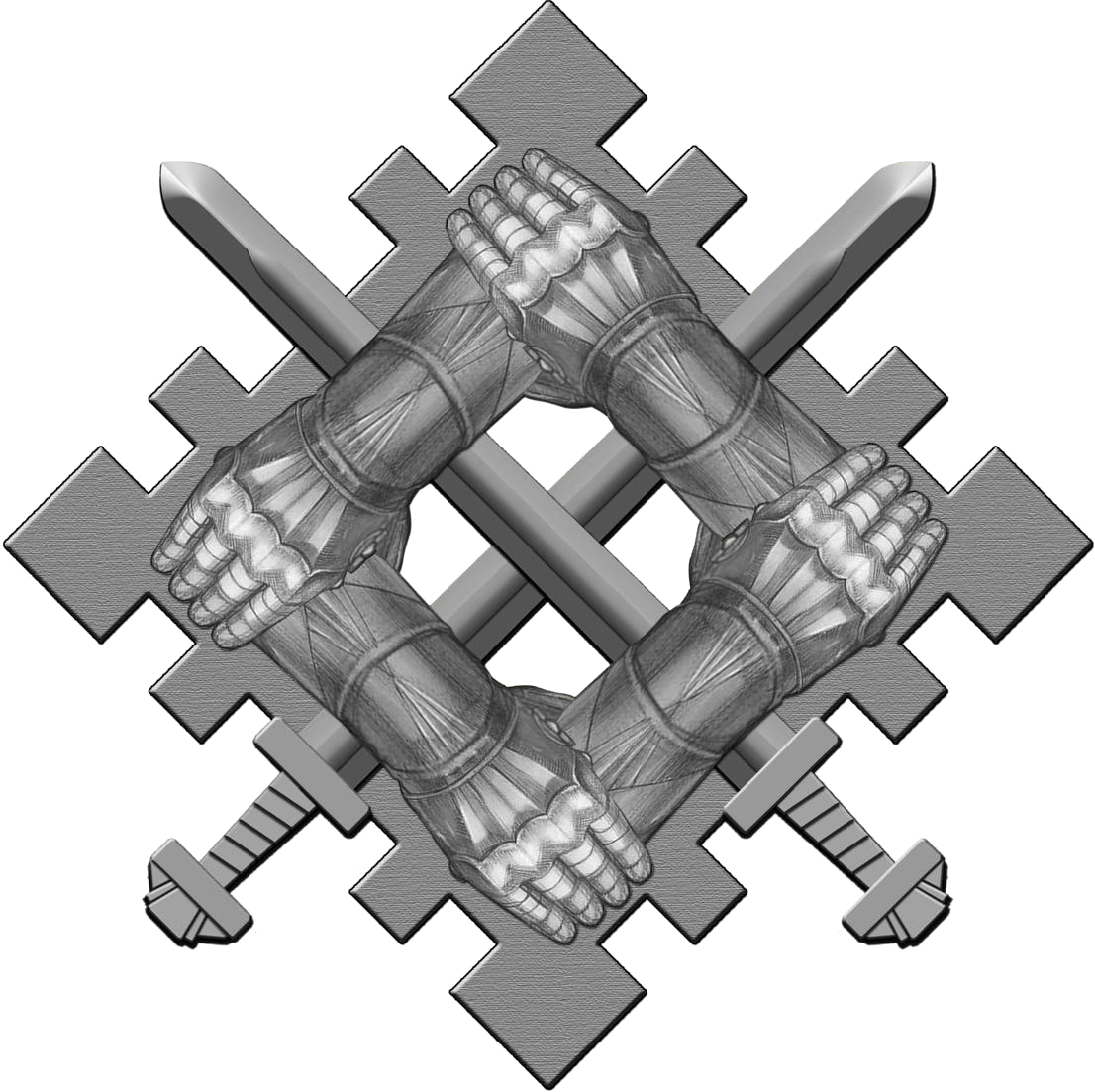
- Beret insignia

The Support Forces of the Armed Forces of Ukraine are a separate branch of the Armed Forces of Ukraine combining the elements engineering troops, radiological, chemical, and biological defence forces, geospatial support, and hydrometeorological and canine services.

== History ==
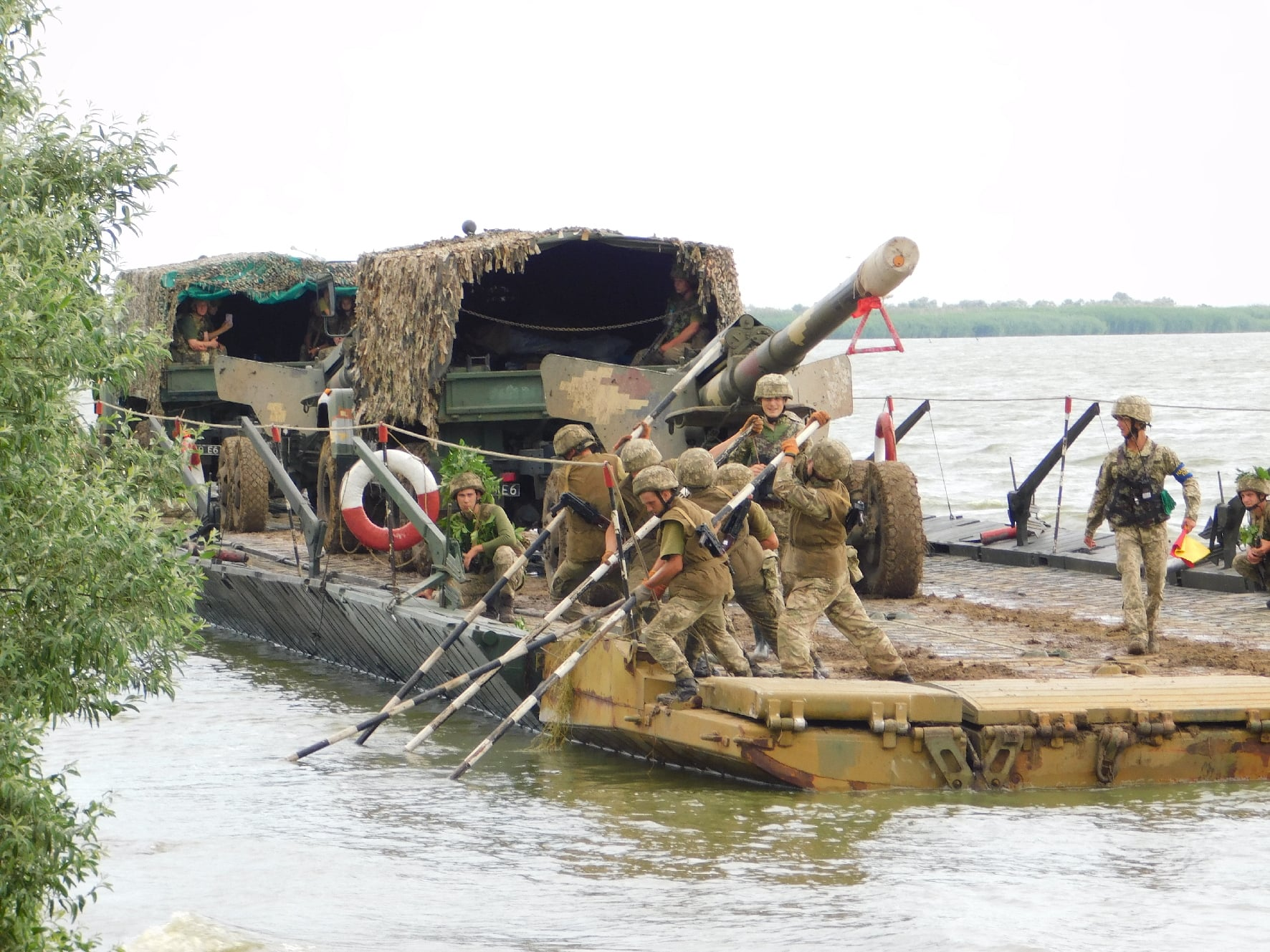
Support Forces moving a Truck and Howitzer over a river during training

In December 2004, the Central Directorate of Engineering Troops of the Main Directorate of Operational Support of the Armed Forces of Ukraine became part of the Support Forces Command.

In accordance with the requirements of the directive of the minister of defense of Ukraine, the Command of the Support Forces of the Armed Forces of Ukraine was disbanded in 2010.

In early February 2020, in accordance with the joint directives of the Ministry of Defense of Ukraine and the General Staff of the Armed Forces of Ukraine, a new command was created - the Support Forces Command. It was created on the basis of the Main Directorate of Operational Support of the Armed Forces of Ukraine.

== Structure ==
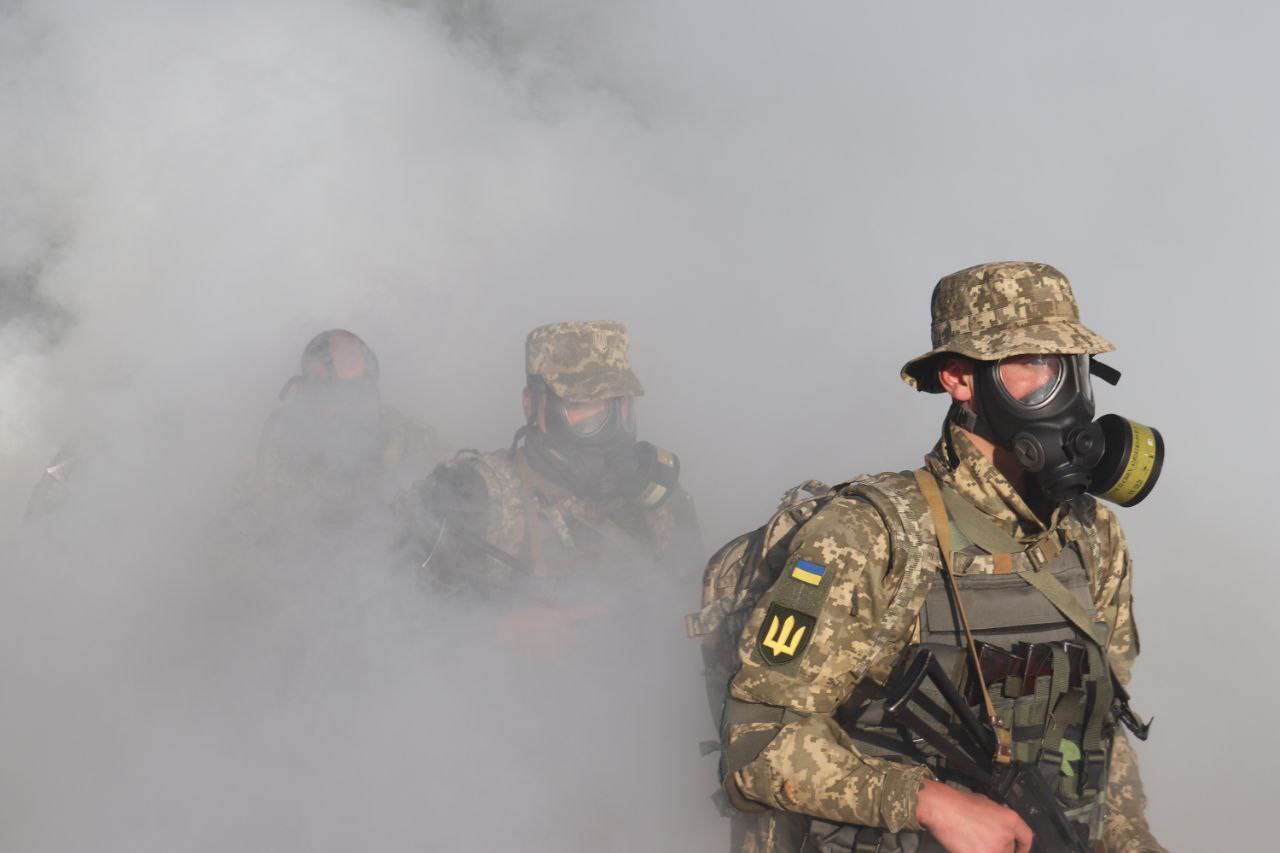
Support Forces CBRN defence training

Support Forces

- Support Forces Command
  - Engineering Troops Directorate
    - Center for Special Engineering Works
    - 20th Arsenal
    - 23rd Engineering Positional Regiment
    - 47th Engineering Brigade
    - 48th Engineering Brigade
    - 49th Demining Brigade
    - 70th Support Brigade
    - 92nd Support Battalion
    - 107th Road Support Center
    - 211th Pontoon Bridge Brigade
    - 250th Engineering Support Center
    - 808th Support Brigade
    - 3046th Central Engineering Base
  - CBRN Troops Directorate
    - 704th CBRN Brigade
    - 536th Central Base
    - Settlement and Analytical Center
  - Military Topography and Navigation Directorate
    - 8th Publishing Center
    - 13th Photogrammetric Center
    - 16th Center
    - 22nd Military Cartographic Unit
    - 64th Topogeodetic Center
    - 115th Cartographic Center
    - 161st Topogeodetic Center
  - Hydrometeorological Center
  - 143rd Joint Training Center

== Commanders ==
- Lieutenant General Anatoly Ivanovich Sobora (2004—2006)
- Colonel Zhirnov Mykola Mykolayovych (2020—2021)
- Major General Dmytro Mykhailovych Gerega (9 August 2021—4 March 2024)
- Brigadier General Yakovets Oleksandr Vasilyovych (4 March—25 April 2024)
- Major General Dmytro Mykhailovych Gerega (since 9 May 2024)

== See also ==
- Armed Forces of Ukraine
- Medical Forces Command
