= 808th Support Brigade =

808th Support Brigade (2024–present) 808th Support Regiment (2020–2024) 808th Pontoon Bridge Regiment (2002–2020) 23rd Pontoon Bridge Brigade (1994–2002) 194th Pontoon Bridge Regiment (1955–1994)
- 808-ма окрема бригада підтримки
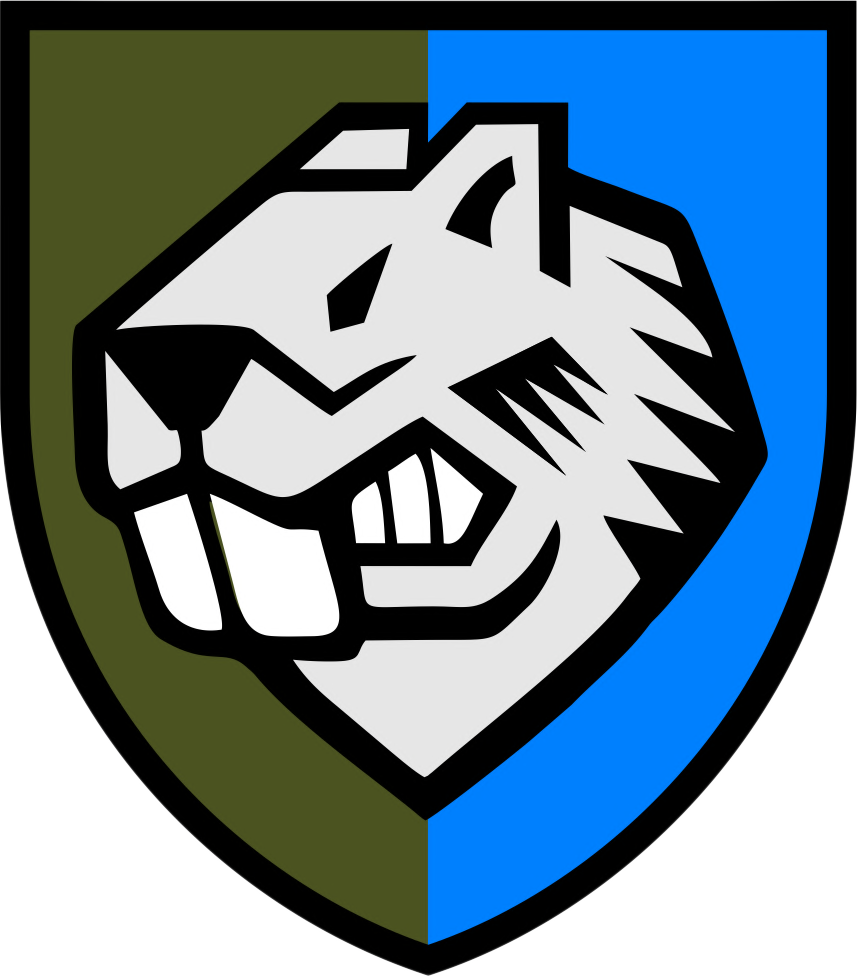
- Founded: October 2, 1955
- Country: Soviet Union (1955–1991); Ukraine (1992–present)
- Allegiance: Armed Forces of Ukraine
- Branch: Support Forces
- Type: Brigade
- Role: Military engineering
- Part of: Engineering Troops Directorate
- Garrison/HQ: Bilhorod-Dnistrovskyi, Odessa Oblast
- Nickname: Dnistrovska
- Engagements: Russo-Ukrainian War; War in Donbass; Russian invasion of Ukraine
- Decorations: For Courage and Bravery
- Website: Official Facebook site

Commanders
- Current commander: Colonel Yevhen Huska

The 808th Separate Support Brigade Dnistrovska (MUN A3955) is a brigade of the Ukrainian Support Forces of the Armed Forces of Ukraine. It was established in 1955 as part of the Soviet military presence in Romania. It is headquartered in Bilhorod-Dnistrovskyi. It has seen combat during both, the War in Donbass and the Russian invasion of Ukraine.

== History ==
In 1955, the Brigade was established as a pontoon battalion in the Romanian city of Brăila, remaining stationed in Romania until redeployment to Bilhorod-Dnistrovskyi in 1958. In 1976, it became the 644th Separate Pontoon-Bridge Battalion and later in 1980, the 194th Pontoon-Bridge Regiment becoming part of the 14th Guards Combined Arms Army.

In 1992, following the Dissolution of the Soviet Union, it was incorporated into the Armed Forces of Ukraine. On 1 December 1994, it became the 23rd Pontoon-Bridge Brigade of the Operational Command South. On 1 December 1998, it was awarded the transitional flag of the Odessa Regional State Administration and won the title of "The Best Military Unit of the Odessa Military District." In the summer of 2000, it built a pontoon crossing across the Southern Bug in Mykolaiv Oblast, temporarily replacing the later repaired Varvarivskyi Bridge. In October 2002, the brigade was reorganized into the 808th Pontoon-Bridge Regiment. It was also engaged in the tasks of regular road clearance during the winter season in Odessa Oblast, in February 2014, it cleared 400 kilometers of roads in the Bilhorod-Dniester Raion and "freed" 11 vehicles using BAT-2 vehicles, moreover, BAT-2, GAZ-66 and KAMAZ-43105 of the regiment further cleared 200 kilometers, elsewhere in the Odessa Oblast. It was also involved in ordinance disposal.

Following the start of the War in Donbass, it was deployed to the ATO zone. In 2015, the regiment participated in tactical exercises with Ukrainian Navy coastal defense artillery units on the Dniester Estuary. On 20 January 2017, chief of the Engineering Troops of the Armed Forces of Ukraine visited its headquarters after it was recognized as the best unit of the Engineering Troops of Ukraine in 2016. It was announced that the regiment will be expanded 1.5 times in terms of personnel. On 7 September 2017, a soldier of the regiment (Artur Anatolyevich Revitsky) was killed in combat in Donbass. On 26 May 2020, 40 pieces of equipment and 50+ personnel of the regiment undertook the restoration of a bridge over Kakhovka Reservoir bay in Dnipropetrovsk Oblast.

Following the full-scale invasion, it saw direct action. In October 2022, some captured personnel of the regiment were returned from Russian captivity.

On 6 December 2022, the regiment was awarded the honorary award For Courage and Bravery.

In 2024, it was expanded to a brigade and on 1 October 2024, it was awarded the honorary name Dnistrovska. It was also considered to be a candidate for pontoon crossings during the 2023 Ukrainian counteroffensive.

On 28 September 2024, the deputy brigade commander, Glozhyk Volodymyr was killed in combat in Makiivka.

== Structure ==
- 808th Separate Support Brigade
- Headquarter
  - Pontoon-Bridge Battalion
    - 1st Pontoon-Bridge Company
    - 2nd Pontoon-Bridge Company
    - 3rd Pontoon-Bridge Company
  - Amphibious vehicles Battalion
  - Transport Units
  - Support Units

== Equipment ==
Model	Image	Origin	Type	Number	Details
Vehicles
KamAZ-43105		Soviet Union	Truck		
GAZ-66		Soviet Union	Truck		
KrAZ-255		Soviet Union	Truck		
BAT-2		Soviet Union	Military engineering vehicle		
IMR-2		Soviet Union	Heavy Combat engineering vehicle		
