= Steel Border Brigade =

15th Mobile Border Guard Detachment "Steel Border"
- 15-й мобільний прикордонний загін "Сталевий кордон" (Ukrainian)
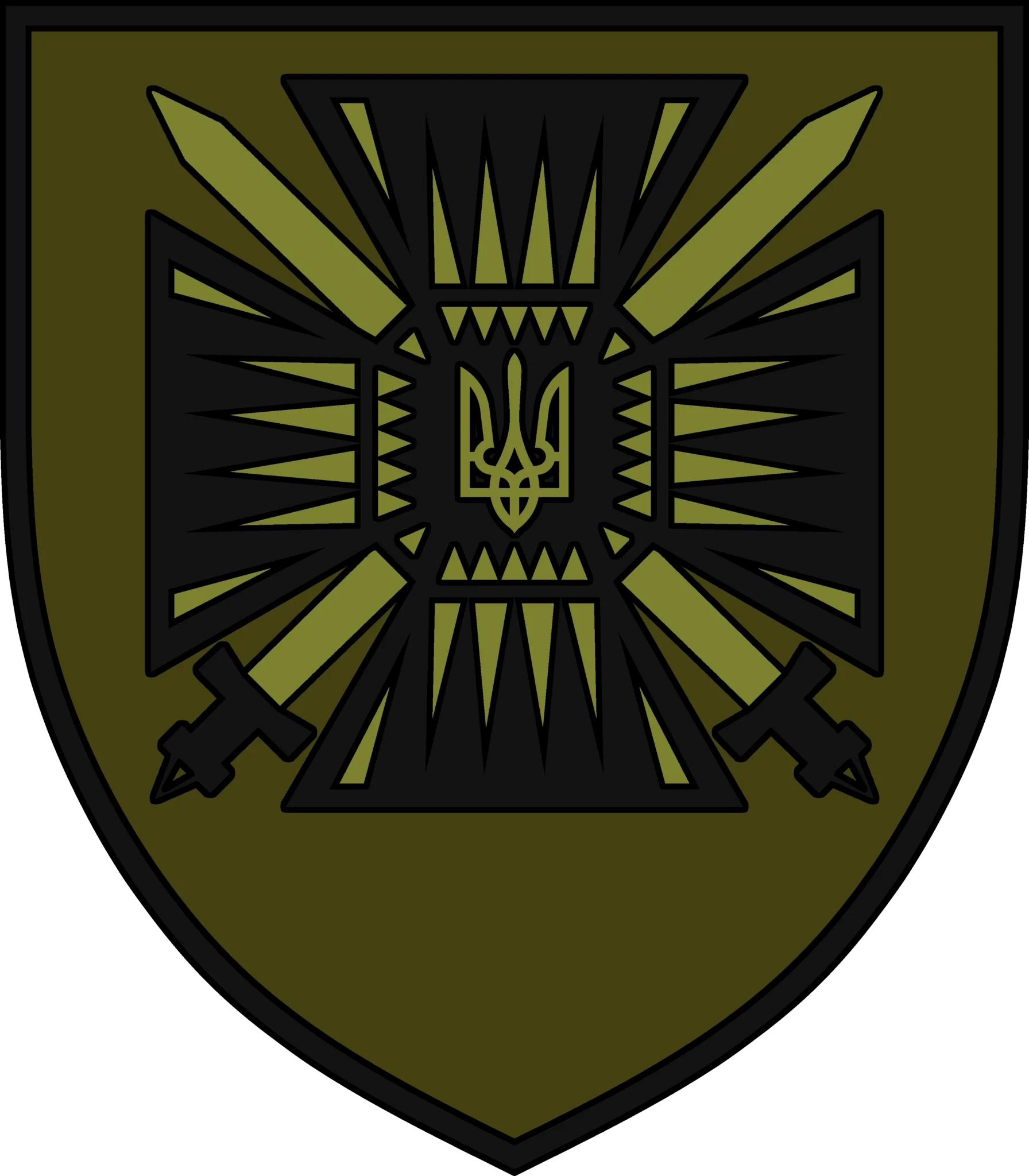
- Brigade Insignia
- Founded: 2023
- Country: Ukraine
- Allegiance: Ministry of Internal Affairs
- Branch: State Border Guard Service of Ukraine
- Type: Brigade
- Role: Mechanized Infantry
- Part of: Offensive Guard, SBSGU
- Motto(s): First at the Border, First in the Offensive
- Engagements: Russo-Ukrainian war: Russian invasion of Ukraine

Commanders
- Current commander: Colonel Kostiantyn Bezpalko
- Notable commanders: Colonel Valerii Padytel

The Steel Border Brigade also known as the 15th Mobile Border Guard Detachment "Steel Border" (Ukrainian: Сталевий кордон, romanized: Stalevyi Kordon) is an assault brigade of the State Border Guard Service of Ukraine and part of the Offensive Guard.

== History ==
The military unit was created in January 2023 as part of the Offensive Guard, recruitment campaign of the Ministry of Defense of Ukraine. The brigade was formed from the servicemen who fought in the Azovstal plant (Mariupol), Lyman, and Bakhmut and includes artillery units equipped with cannons and MLRS, UAV units, aerial reconnaissance groups and MANPADS as well as sniper and assault units. The first commander of Steel Border was Colonel Valerii Padytel, who was captured by Russian forces after the Azovstal steel plant siege in Mariupol and was released from captivity in September 2022. On 24 February 2023, the brigade received a combat flag.

In April 2023, over 7,000 volunteers applied to join Steel Border and the whole Offensive Guard aimed to recruit 40,000 personnel to become the main assault unit of the Ukrainian Defense Forces. On 29 October 2023, a guardsman of the brigade (Andriy Petrovych Sheverdin) was killed under undisclosed circumstances. On 14 November 2023, an officer of the brigade (Efrosynenko Andriy Vasyliovych) was killed in combat in Kharkiv Oblast and was posthumously awarded the "Hero of Ukraine" for his actions.

On 21 January 2024, a guardsman of the brigade (Mazur Oleg Anatoliyovych) was killed in combat in the village of Nesterne, near Vovchansk. On 21 March 2024, it received the honorary award "For Courage and Bravery".

== Commanders ==
- Colonel Valerii Padytel (2023)
- Colonel Kostiantyn Bezpalko (2024)
