= Valerii Padytel =

Ukrainian serviceman (born 1978)

- Валерій Падитель

Personal details
- Born: Valerii Borysovych Padytel; 26 July 1978 (age 47) Dunaivtsi, Khmelnytskyi Oblast

Military service
- Allegiance: Ukraine
- Branch/service: State Border Guard Service of Ukraine
- Rank: Colonel
- Battles/wars: Russo-Ukrainian War
- Awards

Valerii Borysovych Padytel (Ukrainian: Валерій Борисович Падитель; born 26 July 1978, Dunaivtsi, Khmelnytskyi Oblast) is a Ukrainian serviceman, colonel of the State Border Guard Service of Ukraine, a participant of the Russian-Ukrainian war. Hero of Ukraine (2022).

== Biography ==
He graduated from the Bohdan Khmelnytskyi National Academy of the State Border Service of Ukraine. In 2010, he graduated from the Faculty of Management Training at the same university.

He served in the Kherson, Lviv, Mostysk, Chop, Kharkiv, Sumy and Donetsk border guard detachments, as well as in the Northern and Eastern regional departments of the State Border Guard Service of Ukraine.

Since 2021, he has been the commander of the Donetsk Border Guard Detachment of the State Border Guard Service of Ukraine. One of the defenders of Mariupol.

On September 21, 2022, he returned from Russian captivity.

== Awards ==
- the title of Hero of Ukraine with the Order of the Golden Star (14 October 2022)
- Order of Bohdan Khmelnytskyi, 3rd degree (16 March 2022)
