= 2nd Galician Brigade (Ukraine) =

Military unit in Ukraine

2nd Separate Galician Brigade
- 31-ша бригада НГ (Ukrainian)
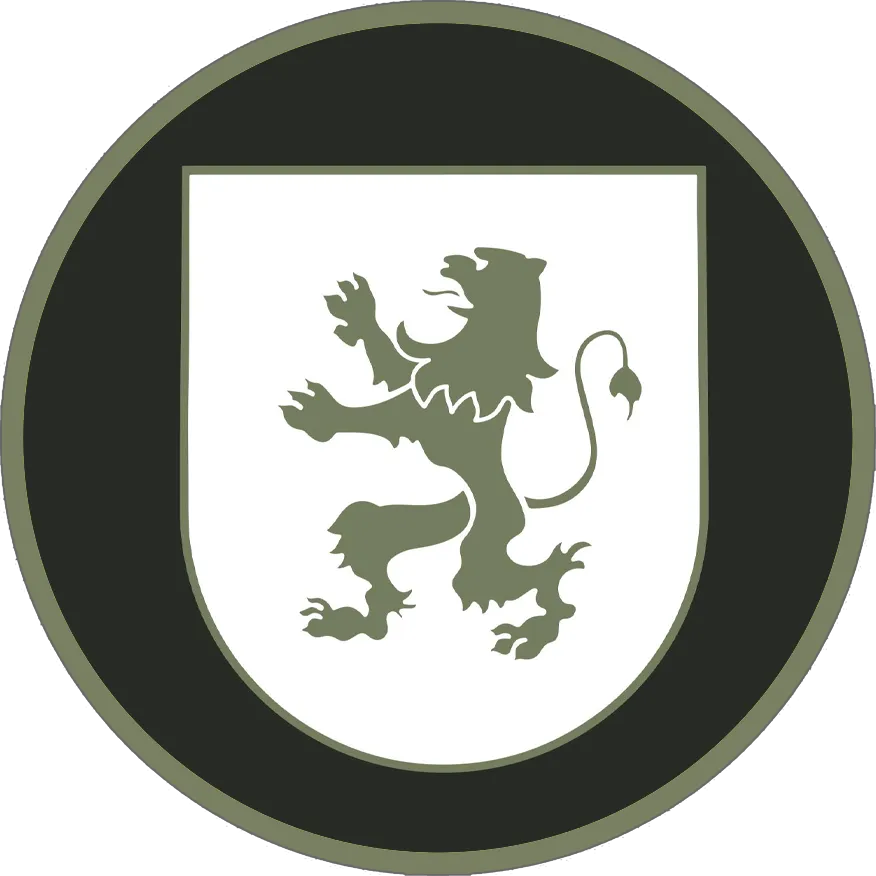
- Brigade Insignia
- Founded: 1992
- Country: Ukraine
- Allegiance: Ministry of Internal Affairs
- Branch: National Guard of Ukraine
- Type: Brigade
- Role: Extraction, logistical and combat support, maintenance of the public law and order, protection of the Ukrainian territorial integrity
- Part of: National Guard of Ukraine
- Garrison/HQ: Lviv, Ternopil, Uzhhorod, Drohobych and Rivne
- Nickname: Galician Guardsmen
- Engagements: Russo-Ukrainian war: War in Donbas; Siege of Sloviansk; Battle of Debaltseve; Russian invasion of Ukraine; Battle of Donbas; Eastern Ukraine campaign
- Decorations: For Courage and Bravery

Commanders
- Current commander: Colonel Petro Yuriyovych Shulyak
- Notable commanders: Colonel Serhii Petrovych Kulchytskyi

Insignia
- Banner

The 2nd Separate Mixed Galician Brigade is a brigade of the National Guard of Ukraine concerned with multiple roles including the extraction of Ukrainian personnel from the frontlines, logistical and combat support, maintenance of the public law and order, among other roles. It was established on the basis of the 16th Convoy Brigade in February 1992 as the 2nd Convoy Brigade. Its main headquarters is in Lviv although its units are also stationed in Ternopil, Uzhhorod, Drohobych and Rivne.

== History ==
On 10 February 1992, the 2nd Separate Convoy Brigade of the Internal Troops of Ukraine was established on the basis of the 16th Convoy Brigade of the Soviet Armed Forces. The 14th Separate Battalion of the National Guard of Ukraine was also separately established in Ternopil.

On 13 September 1999, the 2nd brigade was awarded the honorary name "Galician" and was awarded a battle flag.

After the disbandment of the National Guard of Ukraine in 2000, the 14th Separate Ternopil Special Purpose Battalion became the 2nd Brigade's 2nd battalion. In 2014, the 2nd Brigade became a part of the National Guard of Ukraine after its reestablishment.

It took part in multiple engagements during the war in Donbass. It took part in the siege of Sloviansk and then the Battle of Debaltseve, where on 7 February 2015, a BM-21 Grad attacked the retreating Ukrainian personnel, killing Oleg Anatoliyovych Didushko, a soldier of the brigade. Also during the Battle of Debaltseve, the commander of the brigade's medical center, Taras Hryhorovych Konchevych, was killed when an unarmed military ambulance was ambushed by separatists and detonated a landmine.

The brigade was also involved in humanitarian aid distribution operations in the ATO zone. On 17 May 2015, a humanitarian aid district vehicle of the brigade was struck and exploded near the village of Troitske, Popasna Raion. The resulting explosion killed the brigade's deputy commander, Andrii Apollinariovych Sokolenko and another soldier, Ivan Ihorovych Popil, along with two humanitarian volunteers. Colonel Sokolenko was awarded the Hero of Ukraine for his actions.

On 8 May 2017, a soldier of the brigade, Yaroslav Vasyliovych Smolinskyi, was killed while serving in Donetsk Oblast.

The brigade saw combat during the Russian invasion of Ukraine. It took part in the battle of Donbas where a soldier of brigade, Volodymyr Oryshchuk, was killed in Novokalynove.

In May 2024, the brigade operated in Novodonetske where two soldiers of the brigade, Valery Serebrov and Dmytro Baba, were killed on 23 and 24 May 2024 respectively. It continued to serve in the Donetsk Oblast where two more soldiers of the brigade, Vasyl Kachynskyi and Roman Babukh, were killed on 3 and 20 July 2024, respectively. On 22 August 2024, a UAV operator of the brigade, Boris Borisovych Vladimirov, was killed as a result of mortar shelling on Hrodivka. On 23 August 2024, the brigade was awarded the honorary award "For Courage and Bravery". On 27 September 2024, a soldier of the brigade, Ostap Smolinets, was killed in combat in eastern Ukraine.

== Structure ==
- 1st Rifle Battalion (Lviv)
- 2nd Rifle Battalion (Ternopil)
- 4th Rifle Battalion (Uzhhorod)
- 5th Rifle Battalion (Drohobych)
- 15th Separate Battalion (Rivne)
- Support Units (Lviv)

== Commanders ==
- Colonel Serhii Petrovych Kulchytskyi (2005–2010)
- Colonel Oleg Oleksandrovich Sakhon (2010–2016)
- Colonel Petro Yuriyovych Shulyak (2016-)

== Sources ==
External videos
- 2 Галицька бригада Нацгвардії України відзначила 77-річчя on YouTube
- 77-му річницю відзначила військова частина-3002 on YouTube

- 2 Галицька бригада Національної гвардії України відсвяткувала 77 річницю
- У Львові 2-га Галицька бригада відзначила 77-річчя (ФОТО)
- Друга Галицька бригада Національної гвардії України відзначає 77-річчя з часу створення
- Молоде поповнення прибуло до 2 Галицької бригади
- В Ужгороді гвардійці тренуються в новозбудованому «кілер-хаусі»
