= For Courage and Bravery =

Honorary Award "For Courage and Bravery"
- Type: Unit citation
- Awarded for: To honor the courage and heroism shown during the defense of the state sovereignty, independence, and territorial integrity of Ukraine.
- Country: Ukraine
- Presented by: President of Ukraine
- Established: May 5, 2022
- First award: May 6, 2022

Award of the President of Ukraine — Ribbon to the Battle Flag "For Courage and Bravery"
- Type: Unit citation
- Awarded for: Courage and bravery, military prowess and high levels of combat training during the defense of Ukraine, protection of its sovereignty, territorial integrity and inviolability.
- Country: Ukraine
- Presented by: President of Ukraine
- Status: A draft decree authorizing the award was never made official.
- Established: August 18, 2015 (by draft decree)
- First award: August 24, 2015
- Final award: August 24, 2015

For Courage and Bravery (Ukrainian: За мужність та відвагу, romanized: Za muzhnist ta vidvahu) is an honorary award established by the President of Ukraine to recognize distinguished combat performance, courage, bravery and heroism of units of the Armed Forces of Ukraine, National Guard of Ukraine, State Border Service of Ukraine, Security Service of Ukraine, State Special Communications Service of Ukraine, State Special Transport Service of Ukraine, during the protection of state sovereignty, independence, territorial integrity of Ukraine, while conducting combat operations and performing special tasks.

== History ==
At meeting held at the Ukrainian Ministry of Defense on August 18, 2015, a proposal was made to develop a presidential award to be presented to the units that distinguished themselves in the anti-terrorist operation in the Donbas. It was decided that this award would take the form of an honorary ribbon to be attached to the staff of the unit's battle flag.

On the same day, the Minister of Defense, Colonel-General Stepan Poltorak, signed a letter addressed to the President Petro Poroshenko with a request to consider and sign the draft Decree of the President of Ukraine "On the award of the President of Ukraine – Ribbon to the Battle Flag "For Courage and Bravery".

This decree was to have approved the regulations on the award and its design.

Without waiting for the signing of the decree, the Ministry of Defense decided to order the production of the ribbons. They were ready on August 21 and attached to the battle flags of the 14 units awarded them so they could be presented by President Poroshenko at the March of Independence held in Kyiv on August 24, 2015.

On November 19, 2015, the draft decree "On the award of the President of Ukraine – Ribbon to the Battle Flag "For Courage and Bravery" was considered by the State Awards and Heraldry Commission. At the time Ukrainian law did not provide for collective awards. Because of this the commission decided to propose to the Ministry of Defense "to work out the issue of the legal status of installing the Ribbon to the Battle Flag 'For Courage and Bravery' as a non-state award."

By the time of Russia's invasion of Ukraine on February 24, 2022 the legal barriers to Ukrainian state awards being presented to collective entities had been removed. On May 5, 2022, the President of Ukraine, Volodymyr Zelenskyy, issued a decree establishing the honorary award "For Courage and Bravery." The award was established to recognize "the combat feats of personnel of military units of the Armed Forces of Ukraine and other military formations, courage and heroism shown by servicemen in the struggle for the independence and territorial integrity of Ukraine, honoring their high fighting spirit and will to victory, as well as for the purpose of development of the traditions of the Ukrainian Ground Forces and its sister service branches of the Armed Forces."

== Description ==
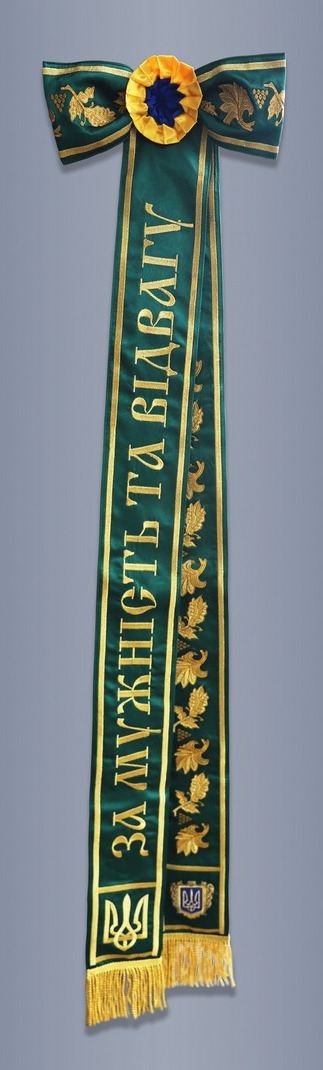
Ribbon of the "For Courage and Bravery" award, 2022

The honorary award "For Courage and Bravery" is awarded by the President of Ukraine at the request of the Commander-in-Chief of the Armed Forces of Ukraine. In the event that a military unit is awarded the "For Courage and Bravery" honor, a double-sided ribbon of green color (the 2015 version had a blue ribbon) is attached to the finial of the pole of the regimental battle colour of the corresponding military unit, trimmed along the perimeter with a golden edging.

On one end of the ribbon, on both sides, the inscription "ЗА МУЖНІСТЬ ТА ВІДВАГУ" ('FOR COURAGE AND BRAVERY') and the image of the Emblem of the Princely State of Volodymyr the Great in gold embroidery. The other end of the ribbon is decorated on both sides with a floral ornament and an image of the Sign of the President of Ukraine. The ends of the ribbon are decorated with gold fringe. The ribbon size is 250 x 12 cm. It is tied with a 30 cm bow with two horizontal rays and fastened with a blue-yellow rosette with a diameter of 10 cm. The ribbon is an integral part of the unit's Battle Colour.

In the case of a military unit awarded the honorary award "For Courage and Bravery", that ribbon is placed on top of the blue ribbon with the inscription of the military unit's honorary title.

Servicemen of military units awarded the "For Courage and Bravery" ribbon can wear signs indicating their affiliation to the respective military units. Descriptions and drawings of such signs, and the order of their wearing are to be established by the Ministry of Defense of Ukraine.

== Awards ==
=== Award of the President of Ukraine — Battle Colour Ribbon "For Courage and Bravery" ===
No.	Unit insignia	Unit name	Branch of service	Date of award
1		128th Mountain Assault Brigade "Zakarpattia"	Ground Forces	August 24, 2015
2		55th Artillery Brigade "Zaporozhian Sich"	Ground Forces	August 24, 2015
3		16th Army Aviation Brigade "Brody"	Ground Forces	August 24, 2015
4		80th Air Assault Brigade "Halychyna"	Air Assault Forces	August 24, 2015
5		299th Tactical Aviation Brigade "Vasyl Nikiforov"	Air Force	August 24, 2015
6		8th Regiment of Operational Purpose "Ivan Bohun" (Now 14th Brigade)	National Guard	August 24, 2015

=== Honorary Award "For Courage and Bravery" ===
No.	Unit insignia	Unit name	Branch of service	Date of award
1		24th Mechanized Infantry Brigade "King Daniel of Galicia"		May 6, 2022
2		28th Mechanized Infantry Brigade "Knights of the Winter Campaign"		May 6, 2022
3		30th Mechanized Brigade "Prince Konstantin Ostrozky"		May 6, 2022
4		72nd "Black Zaporozhian" Mechanized Infantry Brigade		May 6, 2022
5		92nd Mechanized Infantry Brigade "Koshovoho Otamana Ivana Sirka" (Now Assault Infantry)		May 6, 2022
6		93rd "Kholodnyi Yar" Mechanized Infantry Brigade		May 6, 2022
7		128th Mountain Assault Infantry Brigade "Zakarpattia"		May 6, 2022
8		26th Artillery Brigade "Colonel-General Roman Dashkevich"		May 22, 2022
9		503rd Marine Battalion	Marine Corps	June 3, 2022
10		40th Tactical Aviation Brigade “Ghost of Kyiv”		June 15, 2022
11		831st Tactical Aviation Brigade		June 15, 2022
12		96th Anti-Aircraft Missile Brigade "Kyivska"		June 15, 2022
13		160th Anti-Aircraft Missile Brigade "Odesa"		June 15, 2022
14		11th Anti-Aircraft Missile Regiment		June 15, 2022
15		223rd "Ukrainian Sich Riflemen" Anti-Aircraft Missile Regiment		June 15, 2022
16		14th Radio Engineering Brigade "Bohdan Khmelnytskyi"		June 15, 2022
17		LSM Yuri Olefirenko	Navy	June 23, 2022
18		29th Surface Vessels Division	Navy	June 23, 2022
19		25th Airborne Brigade "Sicheslav"		June 28, 2022
20		79th Air Assault Brigade "Tavria"		June 28, 2022
21		80th Air Assault Brigade "Halychyna"		June 28, 2022
22		81st Airmobile Brigade "Slobozhanske"		June 28, 2022
23		95th Air Assault Brigade "Polesia"		June 28, 2022
24		23rd Mariupol Sea Guard Unit	State Border Guard Service	July 27, 2022
25		1st Mobile Border Guard Detachment "Hart"	State Border Guard Service	July 27, 2022
26		8th Regiment of Operational Purpose "Ivan Bohun" (Now 14th Brigade)		July 27, 2022
27		4th Brigade of Operational Assignment		July 27, 2022
28		3rd Operational Brigade "Colonel Petro Bolbochan"		July 27, 2022
29		Eastern Special Operations Center "Prince Svyatoslav the Brave"	Special Operations Forces	July 29, 2022
30		140th Special Operations Regiment	Special Operations Forces	July 29, 2022
31		7th Tactical Aviation Brigade "Petro Franko"		August 24, 2022
32		39th Tactical Aviation Brigade		August 24, 2022
33		114th Tactical Aviation Brigade		August 24, 2022
34		299th Tactical Aviation Brigade "Vasyl Nikiforov"		August 24, 2022
35		138th Anti-aircraft Missile Brigade "Dniprovska"		August 24, 2022
36		156th Anti-aircraft Missile Regiment "Maksym Krivonos"		August 24, 2022
37		301st Anti-aircraft Missile Regiment		August 24, 2022
38		Western Special Operations Center "Prince Izyaslav Mstislavych"		August 24, 2022
39		142nd Training Center		August 24, 2022
40		73rd Naval Special Operations Center "Chieftain Antin Holovaty"		August 24, 2022
41		15th National Guard Regiment "Sloviansk" (Now 18th Brigade)		September 2, 2022
42		3rd Border Detachment "Yevgeny Pikus"		September 7, 2022
43		11th (Kramatorsk) Border Detachment		September 7, 2022
44		1st Tank Brigade "Siversk"		September 24, 2022
45		40th Artillery Brigade "Grand Duke Vytautas"		September 24, 2022
46		57th Motorized Brigade "Otaman Kost Hordiienko"		September 24, 2022
47		12th Operational Brigade "Dmytro Vyshnevetsky"		October 27, 2022
48		9th Operational Regiment "Lieutenant Bohdan Zavada" (Now 15th Brigade)		October 27, 2022
49		43rd Artillery Brigade "Hetman Taras Triasylo"		November 3, 2022
50		44th Separate Artillery Brigade "Hetman Danylo Apostol"		November 3, 2022
51		122nd Airmobile Battalion, 81st Airmobile Brigade		November 17, 2022
52		132nd Reconnaissance Battalion		November 17, 2022
53		148th Howitzer Self-propelled Artillery Division (Now Brigade)		November 17, 2022
54		3rd Battalion Tactical Group, 80th Air Assault Brigade		November 17, 2022
55		13th Airborne Assault Battalion "Colonel Taras Senyuk", 95th Air Assault Brigade		November 17, 2022
56		90th Airmobile Battalion "Senior Lieutenant Ivan Zubkov", 81st Airmobile Brigade		November 17, 2022
57		808th Support Brigade "Dnistrovska"	Support Forces	December 6, 2022
58		302nd Anti-aircraft Missile Regiment "Kharkiv"		December 6, 2022
59		27th Artillery Brigade "Kish otaman Petro Kalnyshevskyi"		December 6, 2022
60		54th Mechanized Infantry Brigade "Hetman Ivan Mazepa"		December 6, 2022
61		15th Mountain Assault Battalion, 128th Mountain Assault Infantry Brigade		December 6, 2022
62		46th Airmobile Brigade		December 6, 2022
63		71st Jaeger Brigade (Now Airmobile)		December 6, 2022
64		138th Center for Special Purposes of the Military Police "Prince Volodymyr Svyatoslavych"	Military Law Enforcement Service	December 6, 2022
65		4th (Kharkiv) Border Detachment	State Border Guard Service	February 11, 2023
66		5th (Sumy) Border Detachment	State Border Guard Service	February 11, 2023
67		27th National Guard Regiment "Prince Sviatoslav Yaroslavich"		February 11, 2023
68		2nd Special State Objects Guard Regiment "Shostkinsky"		February 11, 2023
69		79th (Kherson) Border Detachment		April 30, 2023
70		105th (Chernihiv) Border Detachment "Prince Volodymyr the Great"		April 30, 2023
71		10th Mobile Border Detachment		April 30, 2023
72		10th Mountain Assault Brigade "Edelweiss"		May 5, 2023
73		14th Mechanized Brigade "Prince Roman the Great"		May 5, 2023
74		56th Motorized Brigade "Mariupol"		May 5, 2023
75		406th Artillery Brigade "Ensign General Oleksa Almaziv"		May 23, 2023
76		35th Marine Brigade "Rear Admiral Mykhailo Ostrohradskyi"		May 23, 2023
77		18th Marine Battalion, 35th Marine Brigade		May 23, 2023
78		137th Marine Battalion, 35th Marine Brigade		May 23, 2023
79		Marine Corps General Command		May 23, 2023
80		140th Marine Reconnaissance Battalion		May 23, 2023
81		88th Marine Air Assault Battalion, 35th Marine Brigade		June 2, 2023
82		10th Naval Aviation Brigade "Colonel Ihor Bedzay"		June 2, 2023
83		540th Anti-aircraft Missile Brigade "Lviv Ivan Vyhovsky"		August 5, 2023
84		201st Anti-aircraft Missile Brigade "Hetman Pylyp Orlyk"		August 23, 2023
85		48th Engineering Brigade "Kamianets-Podilskyi"		November 3, 2023
86		808th Support Brigade "Dnistrovska"		November 3, 2023
87		107th Rocket Artillery Brigade "Kremenchuk"		December 6, 2024
88		38th Anti-aircraft Missile Regiment "Yury Tyutyunnyk"		December 6, 2024
89		102nd Territorial Defense Brigade "Dmytro Vitovsky"	Territorial Defence Forces	December 6, 2024
90		38th Marine Brigade "Petro Sahaidachny"		December 6, 2024
91		47th Engineering Brigade		June 28, 2025
92		17th Poltava "Raid" Brigade		June 28, 2025
93		34th Kherson Regiment		June 28, 2025
94		50th Regiment "Semen Vysochan"		June 28, 2025
95		21st Mechanized Brigade		August 23, 2025
96		32nd Artillery Brigade		September 30, 2025
97		12th Army Aviation Brigade "Corporal General Viktor Pavlenko"		September 30, 2025
98		117th Heavy Mechanized Brigade		September 30, 2025
99		16th Separate Artillery Brigade		September 30, 2025
100		18th (Izmail) Marine Guard Detachment		September 30, 2025
101		1st (Odesa) Marine Guard Detachment		September 30, 2025
102		45th Artillery Brigade "Myron Tarnavskyi"		December 12, 2025
103		68th Jaeger Brigade "Oleksa Dovbush" (Now Airmobile)		December 12, 2025
104		16th Army Aviation Brigade "Brody"		December 12, 2025
105		18th Army Aviation Brigade "Igor Sikorsky"		December 12, 2025
106		456th Transport Aviation Brigade "Dmytro Maiboroda"		February 9, 2026
107		67th Mechanized Brigade		February 23, 2026
108		47th Artillery Brigade		February 23, 2026
109		11th Army Aviation Brigade "Kherson"		February 23, 2026
110		4th State Objects Protection Regiment "Pavlohrad"		February 23, 2026
111		115th Mechanized Brigade		February 24, 2026
112		23rd Mechanized Brigade		February 24, 2026
113		5th Assault Brigade "Kyiv"		February 24, 2026
114		82nd Air Assault Brigade "Bukovynska"		March 14, 2026
115		1039th Anti-aircraft Missile Regiment "General-Cornet Mykola Kapustiansky"		March 14, 2026
116		501st Separate Naval Infantry Battalion		March 16, 2026
117		15th National Guard Battalion		March 26, 2026
118		26th (Kharkiv) Aviation Squadron		April 1, 2026
119		421st Unmanned Systems Battalion		April 13, 2026
120		25th Bilhorod-Dnistrovskyi Border Detachment		April 20, 2026
121		42nd Mechanized Brigade "Hero of Ukraine Valerii Hudz"		Mai 14, 2026
122		43rd Mechanized Brigade		Mai 20, 2026
123		23rd Public Order Brigade "Khortytsia"		Mai 26, 2026
124		152nd Jaeger Brigade "Symon Petliura"		Mai 26, 2026
125		414th Unmanned Strike Aviation Brigade "Birds of Madyar"	Unmanned Systems Forces	June 10, 2026
126		1st Center of the Unmanned Systems Forces	Unmanned Systems Forces	June 10, 2026
127		103rd Territorial Defense Brigade "Metropolitan Andrey Sheptytsky"		June 23, 2026
128		32nd Mechanized Brigade "Steel"		July 15, 2026
129		5th Heavy Mechanized Brigade		July 15, 2026
130		141st Mechanized Brigade		August 1, 2026
131		22nd Mechanized Brigade "Mykolaiv"		August 1, 2026
132		11th Public Order Brigade "Mykhailo Hrushevsky"		August 1, 2026
133		24th Odesa Aviation Squadron		August 1, 2026
134		26th Odesa Border Detachment		August 1, 2026
135		31st Mechanized Brigade "Cornet General Leonid Stupnytskyi"		August 17, 2026

== See also ==
- Order for Courage
- Hero of Ukraine
- Hero City of Ukraine
