= 35th Mixed Aviation Squadron (Ukraine) =

Military unit of the Ukrainian Air Force

- 35-та змішана авіаційна ескадрилья
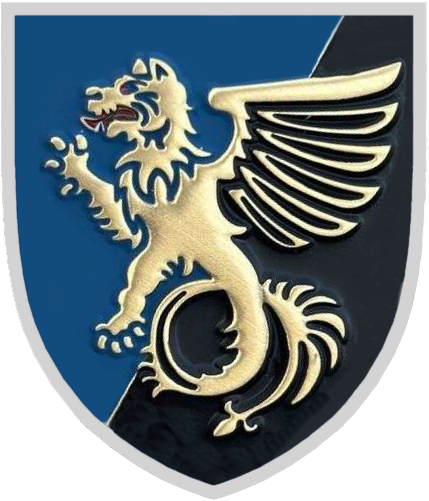
- Active: 2019–present
- Country: Ukraine
- Allegiance: Armed Forces of Ukraine
- Branch: Ukrainian Air Force; Special Operations Forces
- Role: Special operations
- Size: Squadron
- Part of: 456th Transport Aviation Brigade; Special Operations Forces Command
- Garrison/HQ: Havryshivka Air Base, Vinnytsia Oblast
- Engagements: Russo-Ukrainian war: Full scale invasion

Commanders
- Current commander: Bohdan Andrushko

Aircraft flown
- Helicopter: Mi-8, Mi-8 MSB-V, Mi-2
- Transport: An-26

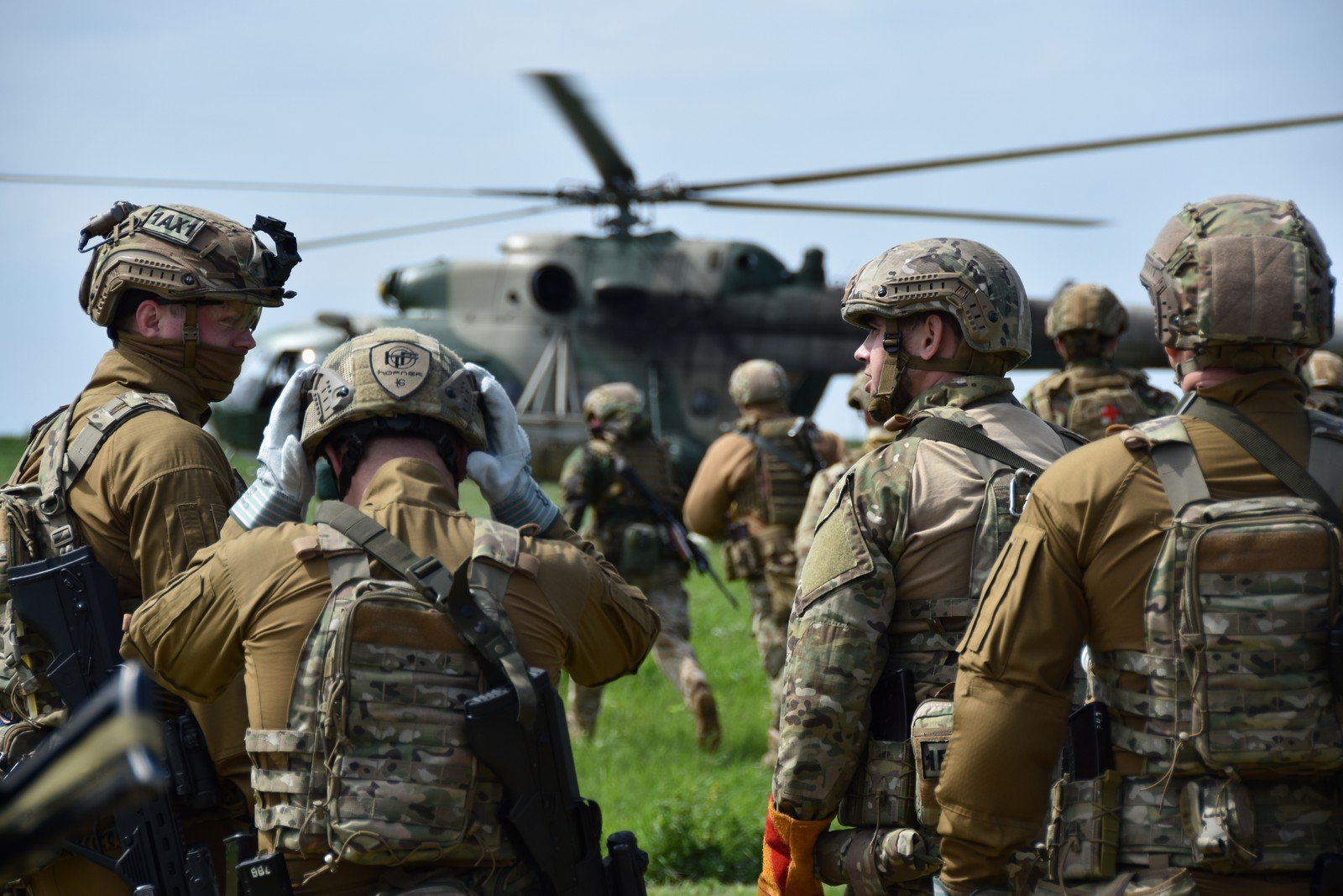
Ukrainian SSO with a helicopter of the Squadron

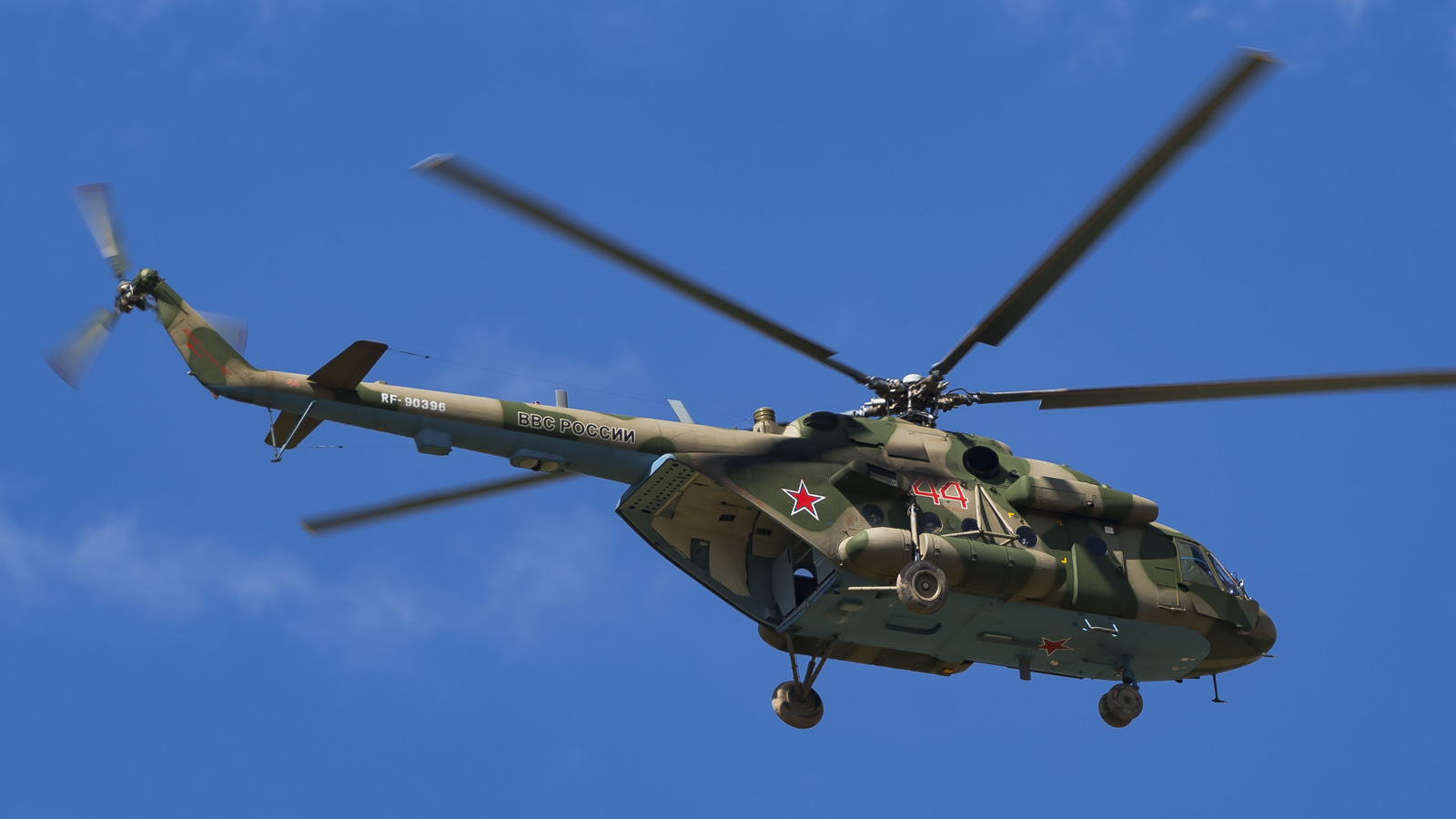
Mi-8AMTSh like the one Ukraine hijacked

The 35th Mixed Aviation Squadron is a tactical aviation unit within the 456th Transport Aviation Brigade of the Ukrainian Air Force, operationally subordinate to the Special Operations Forces Command.

== History ==
The unit was created in 2019 to give the Special Operations Forces of Ukraine air assets for special operations and was conceptualised to meet NATO standards. It started out with Mil Mi-8 and Mil Mi-2 multi-purpose helicopters and was said to receive Mil Mi-24 combat helicopters.

The unit is tasked with insertion, extraction and resupply of special operations forces. It is rumoured that the Squadron operates a Mi-8AMTSh (RF-04428), that was hijacked from Russian forces in August 2023, during Operation Synytsia.
