= Forpost Brigade =

11th Forpost Brigade
- 11 прикордонний загін Краматорськ (Ukrainian)
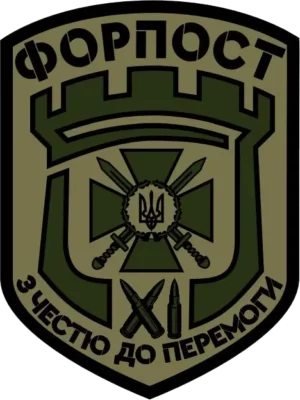
- Detachment Insignia
- Founded: 2015
- Country: Ukraine
- Allegiance: Ministry of Internal Affairs
- Branch: State Border Guard Service of Ukraine
- Type: Brigade
- Role: Border guard
- Part of: State Border Guard Service of Ukraine
- Garrison/HQ: Kramatorsk
- Engagements: Russo-Ukrainian war: War in Donbass; Russian invasion of Ukraine; Eastern Ukraine campaign; Battle of Avdiivka; Battle of Lyman; Battle of Bakhmut; 2024 Kharkiv offensive; Battle of Vovchansk
- Decorations: For Courage and Bravery

Commanders
- Current commander: Colonel Tsapyuk Ruslan Valeriyovych

Insignia
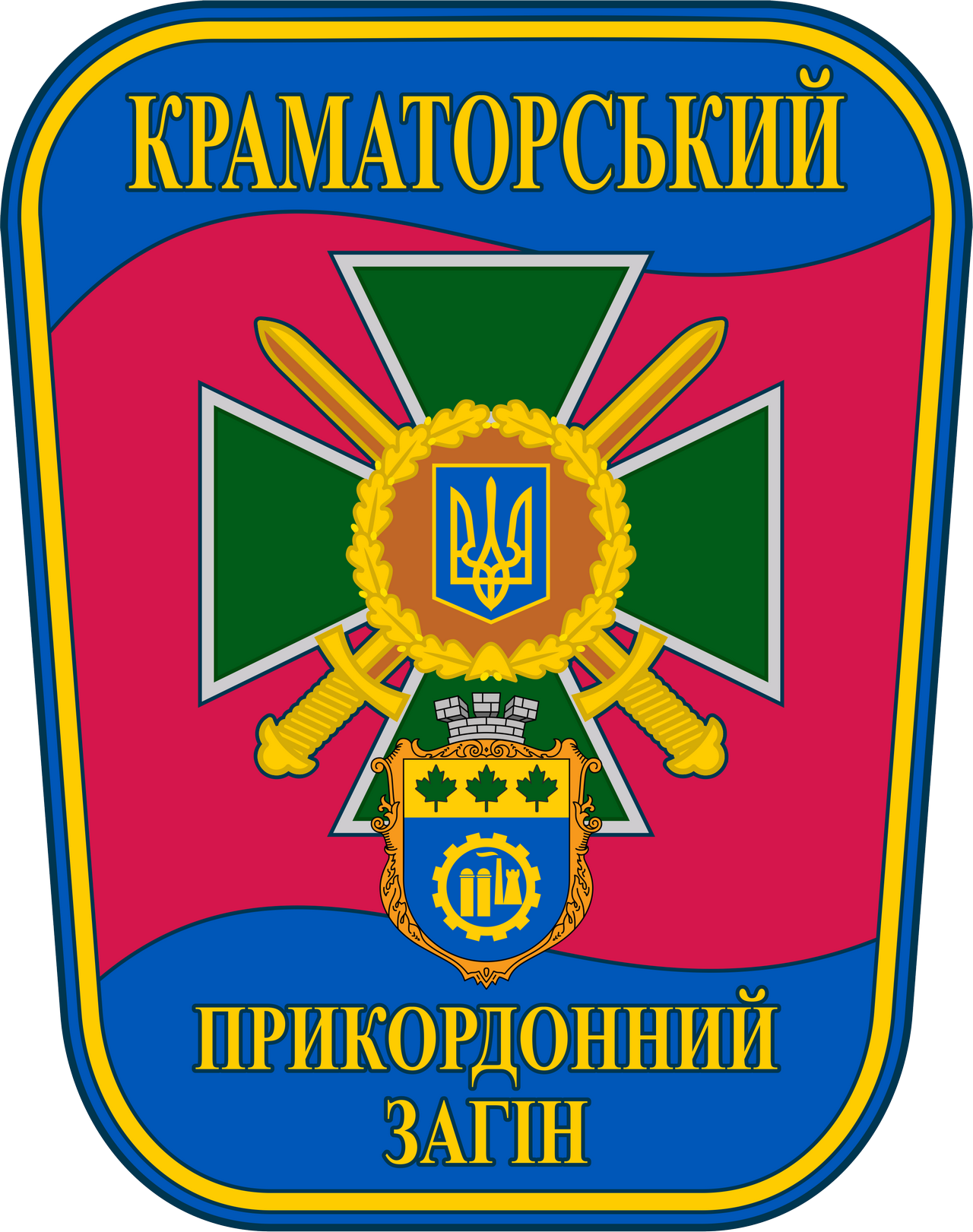
- Former Insignia

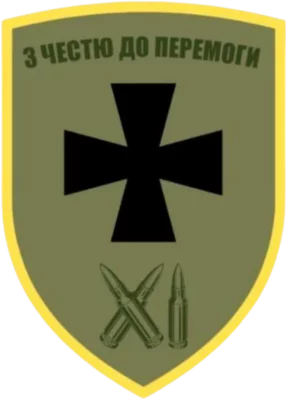
- Former Insignia

The Forpost Brigade (MUN 2382) formerly the Kramatorsk Border Detachment is a brigade level detachment of the Eastern Department of the State Border Service of Ukraine. The detachment guarded the ATO zone contact line in Donetsk Oblast prior to the Russian invasion of Ukraine following which it saw direct combat against Russian forces and was expanded to a brigade in 2024. The detachment guards contact length of 132 km.

== History ==
It was established on 30 October 2015, to guard the security zone along the line of control in the "D" and "M" sectors of the ATO zone with a total length of 132 km. On 8 November 2015, a guardsman of the detachment (Ihor Volodymyrovych Neshko) died as a result of an accident near Heorhiivka, six more guardsmen of the detachment were wounded.

In July 2016, three servicemen of the Kramatorsk Detachment received eye injuries following separatist use of laser weapons. On 17 March 2018, a guardsman of the detachment (Ihor Mykolayovych Dulko) died while performing duties at the "Mayorske" checkpoint. In 2021, the detachment conducted an operation seizing 2.2 thousand packs of illegal cigarettes.

Following the Russian invasion of Ukraine, the detachment has taken an active part in battles against Russian forces. On 7 September 2022, the 11th Kramatorsk border detachment was awarded the honorary award "For Courage and Bravery". On 23 October 2023, a guardsman of the detachment (Vasiliev Oleksandr Borisovych) was killed during the Battle of Bakhmut. On 2 December 2023, a guardsman of the detachment (Kashchenko Rostyslav Mykolayovych) was killed during the Battle of Bakhmut. In December 2023, the detachment received a medevac ground drone. On 20 August 2024, a guardsman of the detachment (Martyniuk Oleksandr Viktorovych) was killed due to mortar shelling during the 2024 Kharkiv offensive. On 21 August 2024, the detachment destroyed multiple Russian positions in Kharkiv Oblast. In September 2024, it struck hidden Russian positions. On 24 October 2024, the detachment struck Russian positions in Vovchansk using Vampire UAVs.

On 8 November 2024, the detachment struck and immobilized a Russian BMP. The detachment also operates Leleka-100 reconnaissance drone. On 17 November 2024, during the Battle of Vovchansk, two Russian infantry detachments attacked the position of the Kramatorsk Detachment. Firstly the position was struck by 120mm mortars and then launched a bipronged assault supported by two IFVs. Following the two hour engagement, 12 Russian soldiers had been killed and 2 were captured, both IFVs had also been destroyed.

On 30 November 2024, it was expanded to a brigade named the Forpost Brigade as a part of the Offensive Guard campaign.

== Structure ==
The structure of the detachment is as follows:

- Management and Headquarters
- 1st Rapid Response Mobile Checkpoint
- 2nd Rapid Response Mobile Checkpoint
- 1st Border Guard Service Department
- 2nd Border Guard Service Department
- Type C Department
- Guardian Units

It operates following checkpoints:

- Automobile Checkpoints
  - "Kramatorsk"
  - "Mayorske"
  - "Marinka"
- Railway Checkpoints
  - "Fenolna" (Lyman)
  - "Bakhmut"

== Commanders ==
- Colonel Golovko Yury Oleksiyovych
- Colonel Tsapluk Ruslan Valeriyovych
- Colonel Fedorchuk Anatoly Viktorovych
- Colonel Pavlo Volodymyrovych Tsvelich
- Colonel Kravchuk Genadiy Volodymyrovych
- Colonel Deineko Andriy Vasyliovych
- Colonel Tsapyuk Ruslan Valeriyovych

== Sources ==
- Краматорський прикордонний загін Ukrainian Military Pages
- У Краматорську починає діяти місцевий прикордонний загін
