= 11th Anti-aircraft Missile Brigade =

11th Anti-Aircraft Missile Brigade 11th Anti-Aircraft Missile Regiment (1992–2025)
- 11-та зенітна ракетна бригада
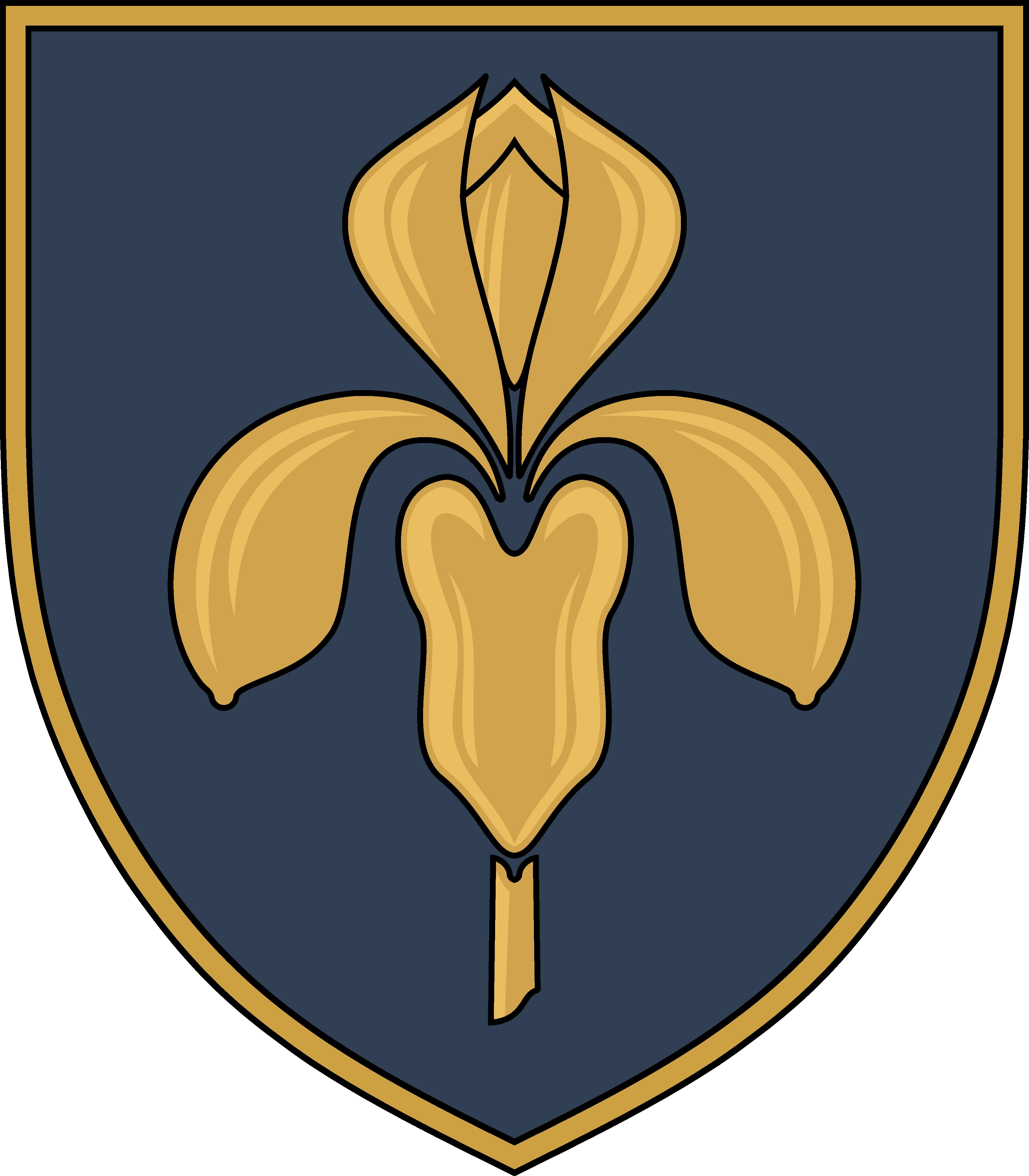
- Active: 1960 – present
- Country: Ukraine; Soviet Union (1960–1991)
- Allegiance: Armed Forces of Ukraine
- Branch: Ukrainian Air Force
- Type: Air Defense Troops
- Role: Air Defense
- Size: Brigade
- Part of: Air Command West
- Garrison/HQ: Shepetivka, Khmelnytskyi Oblast
- Nickname: Shepetivska Brigade
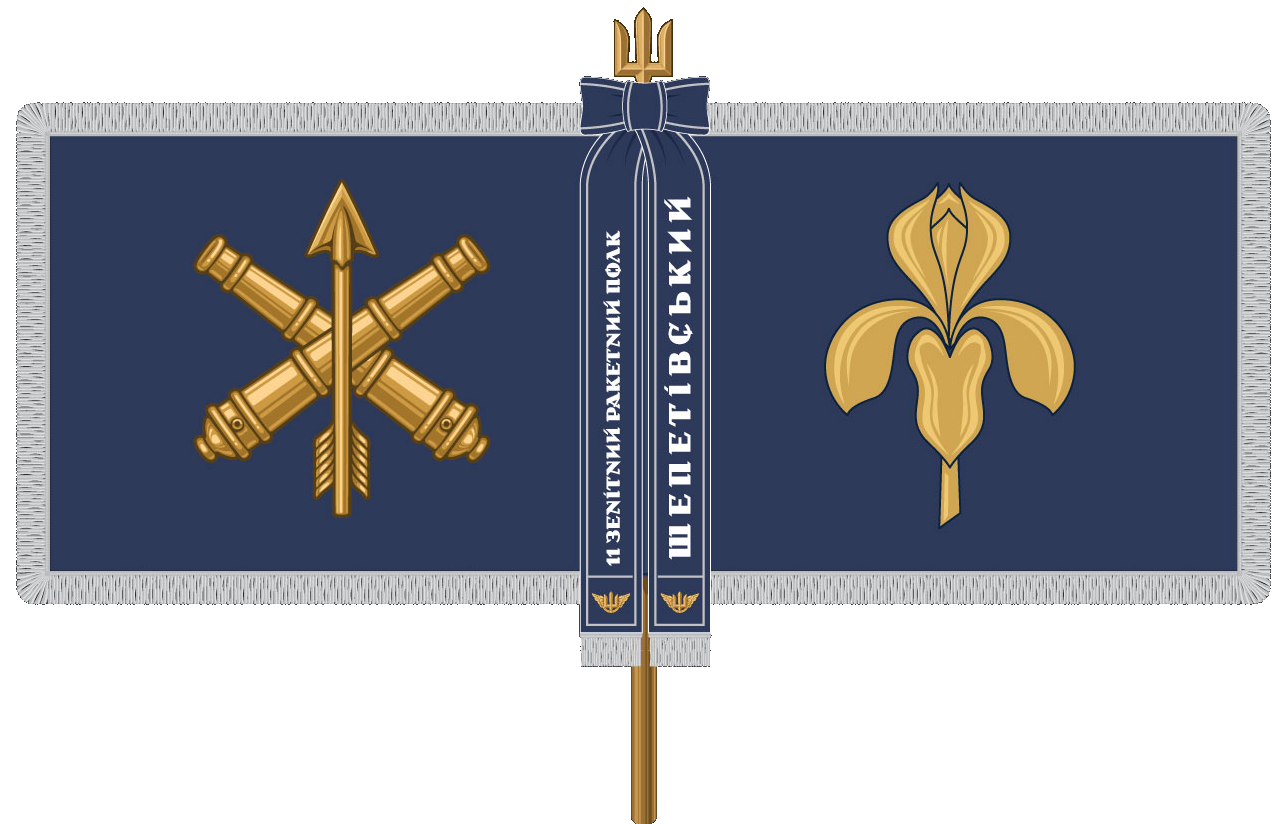
- Colors
- Equipment: Buk M1, IRIS-T SLM, TRML-4D
- Engagements: Russo-Ukrainian war: War in Donbas; Full scale invasion 2022
- Decorations: For Courage and Bravery

Commanders
- Current commander: Colonel Mykhailo Borysenko

Insignia
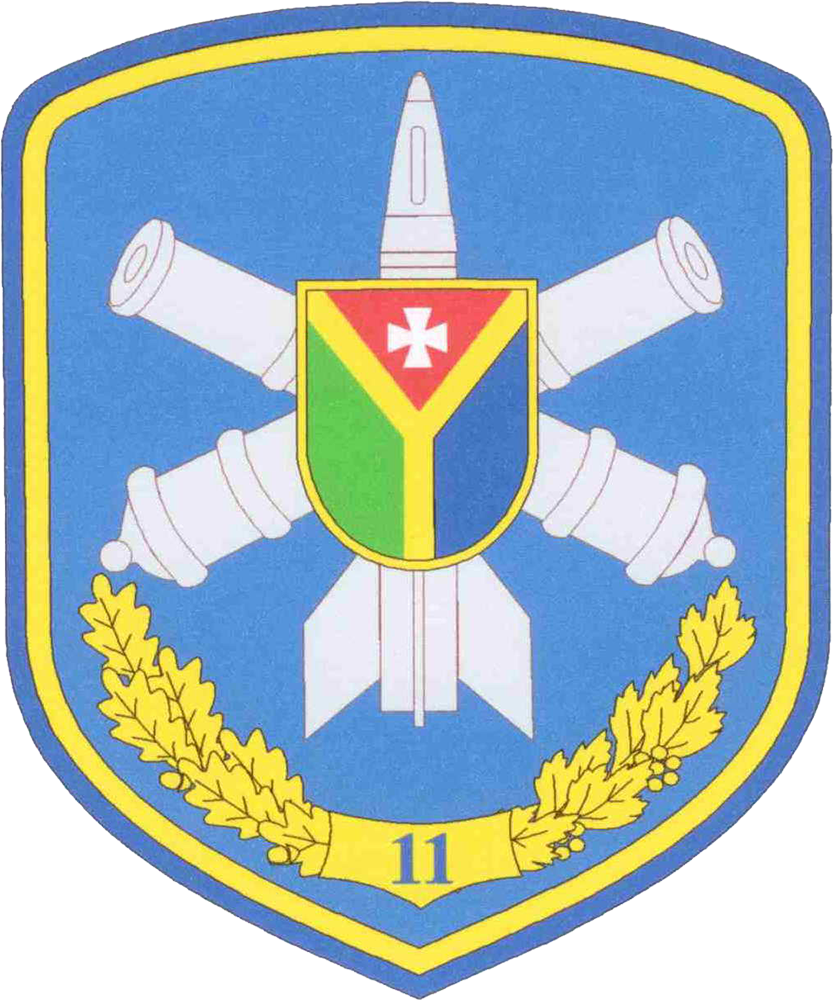
- Former Insignia

The 11th Shepetivska Anti-Aircraft Missile Brigade (MUN A3730) is a brigade of the Ukrainian Air Force tasked with air defense operations and is subordinated to the Air Command West. It is headquartered at Shepetivka.

== History ==
In 1992, after the Dissolution of the Soviet union, the 138th Anti-Aircraft Missile Brigade of the 8th Tank Army of the Carpathian Military District took an oath of loyalty to Ukraine becoming the 11th Anti-Aircraft Missile Regiment.

=== Russo-Ukrainian war ===
The regiment saw intensive combat during the War in Donbass. It undertook combat operations in Volnovakha Raion where a soldier of the Regiment (Valentyn Viktorovych Drachuk) was allegedly captured near Novotroitske on 30 December 2014 and his dead body was later recovered. The regiment took part in the Battle of Avdiivka carrying out air defense tasks and on 23 March 2015, during the mortar and tank shelling of Ukrainian positions in Opytne and Avdiivka, together with other units, the regiment performed reconnaissance tasks when a tank attacked the regiment's positions killing a soldier of the regiment (Savitsky Yuri Mykolayovych) and wounding another.

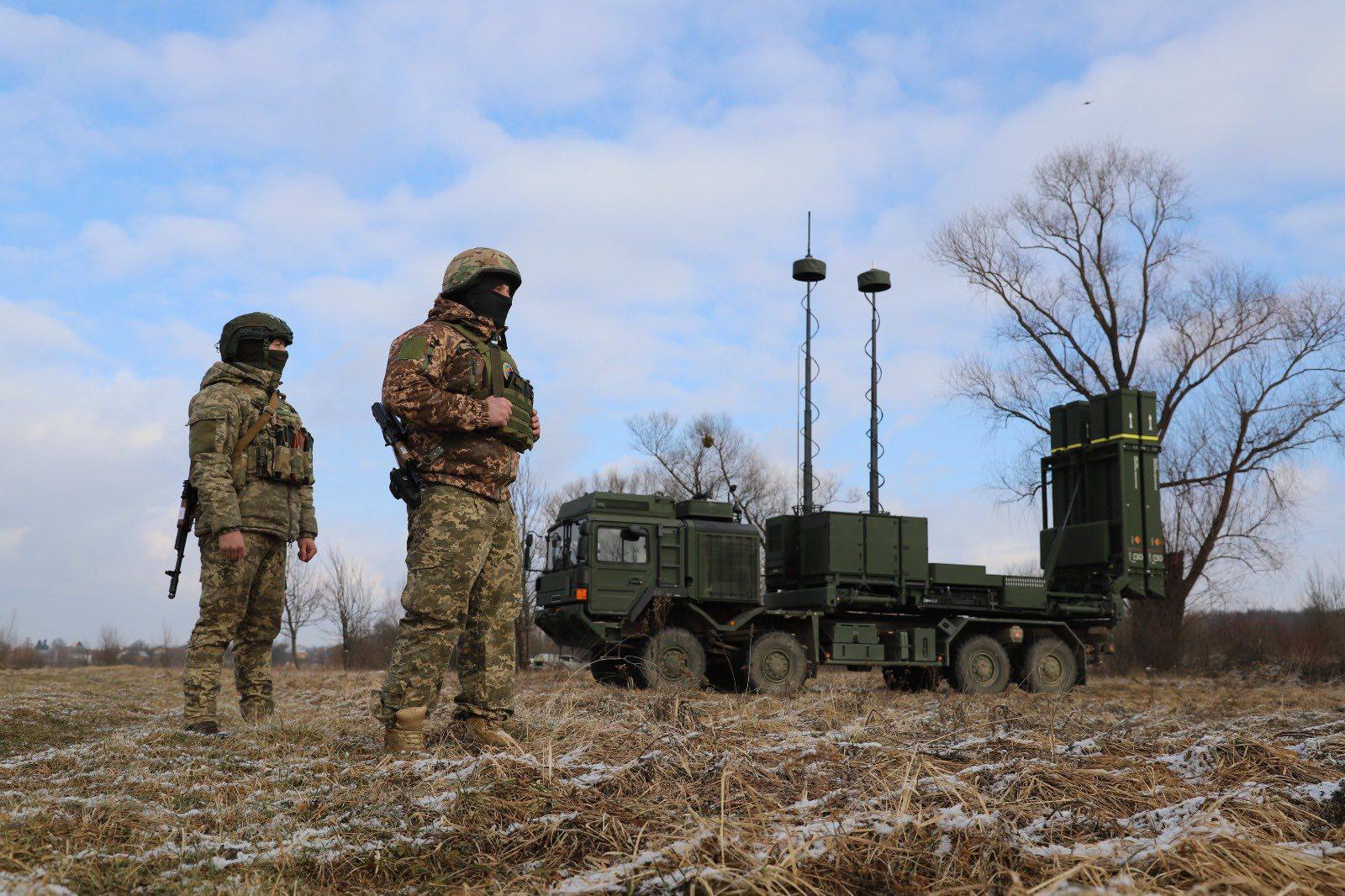
IRIS-T SLM of Brigade

On 9 January 2017, a soldier of the regiment (Us Serhii Volodymyrovych) was killed in combat in Donetsk Oblast under undisclosed circumstances. On 1 December 2017, a soldier of the regiment (Oleksandr Yuriyovych Gornyi) was killed in combat in Donetsk Oblast under unknown circumstances.

At the start of the Full scale invasion on February 24 2022, the regiment was deployed to Nova Kakhovka, and later to Zaporizhzhia. On February 26 the regiment made its first kill of a Mi-17 using two missiles. In mid-March 2022, the regiment was deployed to Izium, Kharkiv region, and on the very first day it shot down a Russian helicopter. In total, the regiment destroyed at least 28 Russian targets: eleven fixed wing aircraft, two helicopters, two cruise missiles and thirteen UAVs. During combat operations near Balaklia and Izium, the "Buk M1" systems destroyed helicopters, two cruise missiles, some planes and UAVs. Once a battery of the regiment was struck by the Russians and was heavily damaged but was restored. During the Russian invasion of Ukraine, the regiment took part in Eastern Ukraine campaign and on 24 March 2022, four personnel (Artem Oleksandrovich Slisarchuk, Yuriy Volodymyrovych Kukuev, Volodymyr Serhiyovych Lutsenko and Bohdan Volodymyrovych Demkiv) of the regiment were killed while performing combat operations in Izium. Artem Oleksandrovich Slisarchuk was later awarded the Hero of Ukraine, the highest military award for Ukrainian personnel. On 15 June 2022, the regiment was awarded the honorary award "For Courage and Bravery". On 29 November 2022, a soldier of the regiment (Kononchuk Serhiy Vasyliovych) was killed under undisclosed circumstances.

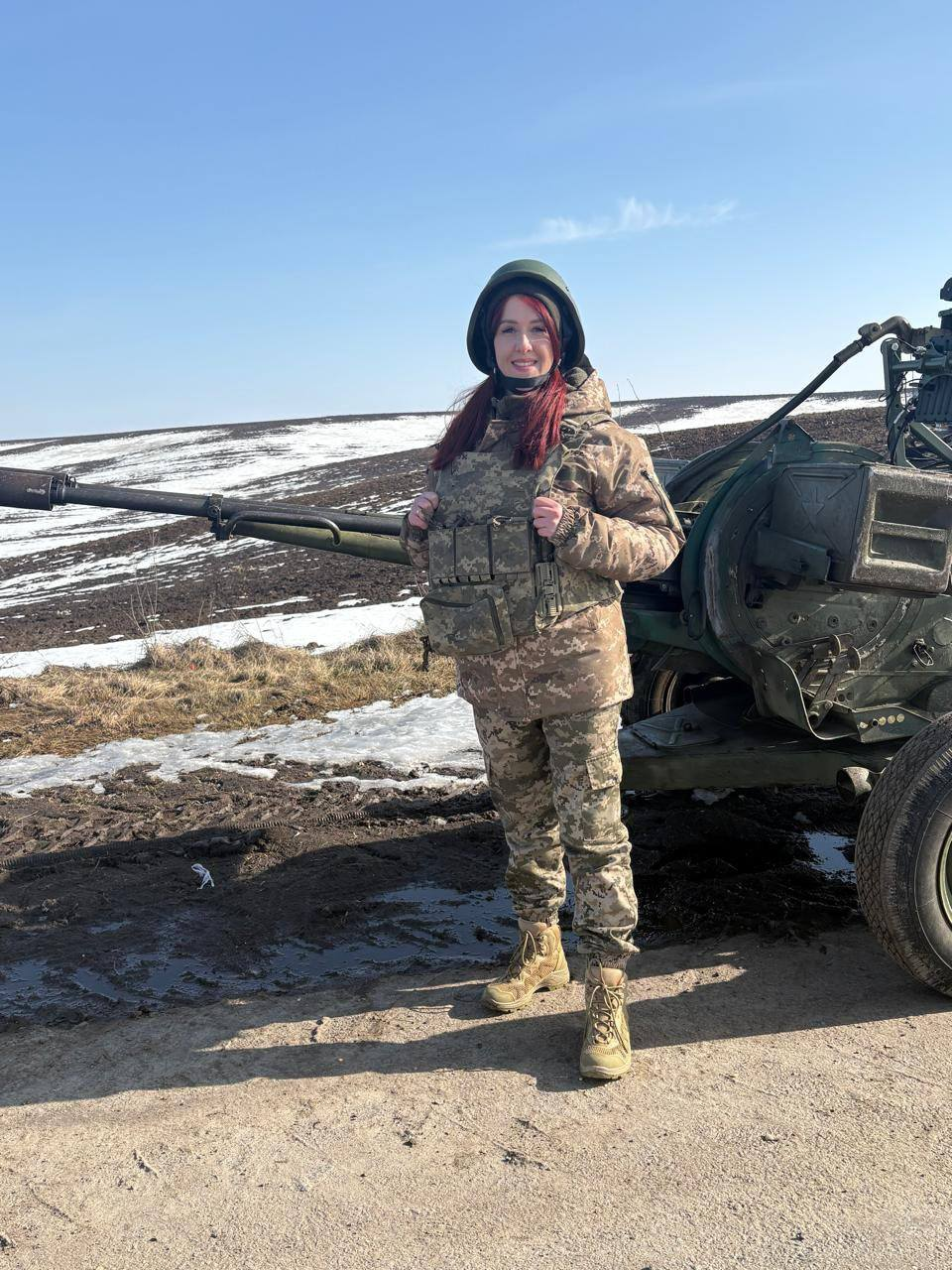
Soldier of a mobile fire team

The regiment saw action in Spirne and on 21 October 2023, a soldier (Dmytro Sergeyevich Murastiy) of the regiment was killed there.

== Structure ==
The structure of the brigade includes the following divisions:

11th Anti-aircraft Missile Brigade
  - 771st Separate Anti-aircraft Missile Division
  - 1003rd Separate Anti-aircraft Missile Division
  - 1084th Separate Anti-aircraft Missile Division

== Commanders ==
- Grigorenko Yevhenii Anatoliyovych (?-2022)
- Borysenko Mykhailo Vitaliyovych (2022-)

== Sources ==
- Військові частини Повітряних Сил за родами військ
