= 456th Transport Aviation Brigade =

Military unit of the Ukrainian Air Force

- 456-та бригада транспортної авіації
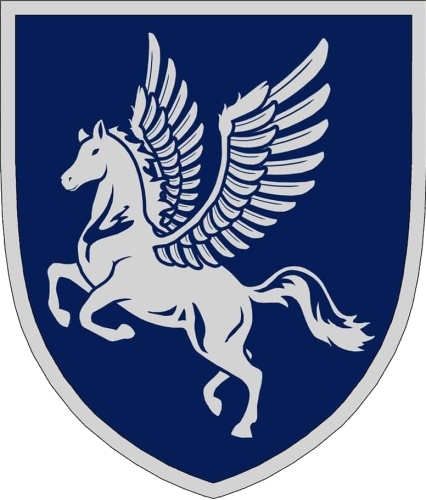
- Active: – present
- Country: Ukraine} Soviet Union (–1991)
- Allegiance: Armed Forces of Ukraine
- Branch: Ukrainian Air Force
- Type: Air Force Aviation
- Role: Transportation
- Size: Brigade
- Part of: Air Command Center
- Garrison/HQ: Havryshivka Air Base, Vinnytsia Oblast
- Nickname: Dmytro Mayboroda
- Patron: Dmytro Mayboroda
- Engagements: Russo-Ukrainian war: War in Donbas; Battles on the border
- Decorations: For Courage and Bravery
- Website: Official Facebook page

Commanders
- Current commander: Andriy Sidash

Insignia
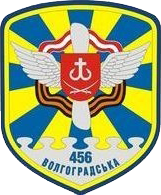
- Former Insignia

- Roundel

- Fin flash

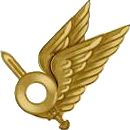
- Aviation branch insignia collar

Aircraft flown
- Helicopter: Mi-8, Mi-9, Mi-8MSB-V
- Transport: An-24, An-26

The 456th Transport Aviation Brigade named after Dmytro Maiboroda (MUN A1231) is an aviation unit of the Ukrainian Air Force. The brigade is composed of An-26 military transport aircraft and Mi-8 helicopters. It is stationed at Havryshivka Air Base, Vinnytsia Region. Structurally, it belongs to Air Command Center.

The brigade took part in the War in Donbas, in particular, delivering supplies by air to units of the Ukrainian Ground Forces fighting on the Russian-Ukrainian border in July 2014.

The brigade is named after Dmytro Mayboroda, an An-26 aircraft commander who died during the war in eastern Ukraine, and received the honor of Hero of Ukraine.

== History ==
In September 1991, the 177th Separate Guards Transport Aviation Squadron of the Soviet Air Force was reorganized as the 456th Separate Guards Aviation Regiment. The regiment took an oath of loyalty to the people of Ukraine at the beginning of 1992.

In 1996, the Minister of Defense of Ukraine, Oleksandr Kuzmuk, tested the Il-22 air command post, which was in the combat formation of the regiment.

In October 2003, an aviation transport brigade was created, and in 2007, the unit received its current name.

At the beginning of 2008, as part of the implementation of the "Program for the Development of the Medical Support System of the Armed Forces of Ukraine for the Period Until 2011", the formation of a mixed aviation and transport unit of medical aviation was completed as part of the brigade. It includes a search and rescue and medical transport aviation unit (4 An-26 aircraft) and two helicopter medical and transport units (6 Mi-8 helicopters).

On December 6, 2010, the unit received a new battle flag.

=== War in Donbas ===
On July 14, 2014, an An-26 transport aircraft of the brigade with flight number 19 was shot down in the Luhansk region near the Russian-Ukrainian border at an altitude of 6,500 meters. Two crew members — Lt. Col. Dmytro Maiboroda and Assistant Commander Lt. Col. Dmytro Shkarbun died.

At the beginning of January 2020, the 35th Mixed Aviation Squadron was formed as part of the brigade, which is operationally subordinate to the command of the Special Operations Forces. 80% of the squadron is composed of servicemen of the 456th Brigade. It is planned to have three types of aviation equipment in service - Mi-2 and Mi-8 helicopters, An-26 aircraft, and later Mi-24 combat helicopters.

=== Full scale invasion ===
On 9 February 2026 the unit was awarded the Presidential Award For Courage and Bravery by the President of Ukraine Volodymyr Zelenskyy.

=== List of aircraft ===
Tail Number	Type	Status	Note
Blue 25	An-26 Vita Medevac	Operational as 2021	
Blue 45	An-26	Operational as 2021	
Blue 46	An-26	Operational as 2021	
Blue 57	An-26	Destroyed in the ground by a Russian attack on Vinnytsia International Airport - 6 March 2022.	
Blue 59	An-26KPA	Shot down by Russian Forces in the first day of the war - 24 February 2022.	Five of a crew of 14 were killed.

== Flight Crew ==
On December 3, 2016, at the Havryshivka military airfield, an An-26 aircraft named after the Hero of Ukraine Dmytro Maiboroda (b/n 35 "blue") was ceremoniously handed over to the brigade.

On December 1, 2018, the brigade received a repaired Mi-8MT.

On May 13, 2019, the 410th Civil Aviation Plant handed over a refurbished An-26 military transport aircraft to the brigade.

== Structure ==
456th Transport Aviation Brigade

- Headquarters
  - 35th Mixed Aviation Squadron
  - Transport aviation squadron (An-24/-26)
  - Helicopter squadron (Mi-8, Mi-9)
  - Airfield maintenance battalion
  - Battalion of communications and radio technical support
  - Technical and operational part of aviation and automotive equipment:
    - Regulation and repair of airplanes and helicopters
    - Aviation engine regulation and repair group
    - Guard company
  - Fire brigade
  - Medical center

== Commanders ==
- Colonel Oleg Ivanovich Nechiporuk (2010 – 2019)
- Colonel Andriy Viktorovych Sidash (since 2019)

== Traditions ==
On August 22, 2019, the President of Ukraine awarded the brigade an honorary name: "in the name of Dmytro Maiboroda".

== Symbols ==
At the end of October 2019, the 456th Brigade received a new emblem. The arm badge is made in the colors of the Air Force of the Armed Forces of Ukraine. The sign is made in the form of a heraldic shield with a light gray edging. The central element is the image of the silver winged horse Pegasus.

== Equipment ==
At the same time, a unique Il-22 air command post (factory number 2964017104, aircraft number 75918) was stored in the brigade. Released in 1984. In total, since 1992, this IL-22 spent only 3 hours in the air. The issue of allocating funds for the restoration of this aircraft was repeatedly raised. However, due to the limited funding of the army and military aviation in particular, the funds were never allocated. In 2014, the company Ukrspecexport sold it to the Odesa private company Intertrans.

As of 2015, the brigade possesses the An-12, An-24, An-26.

== Losses ==
- Lieutenant Colonel Dmytro Oleksandrovych Maiboroda, July 14, 2014
- Lieutenant Colonel Dmytro Pavlovich Shkarbun, July 14, 2014
- Ensign Maksym Serhiyovych Kernychny, June 29, 2017

== Links ==
- Максим Хорошунов, Від Сохондо до Гавришівки (дзеркало) // Народна армія, 21 June 2011
- 456-та бригада транспортної авіації // Книга пам'яті
- Військові частини Повітряних Сил // Ukrainian Military Pages
- "456-та бригада транспортної авіації отримала нову емблему". www.ukrmilitary.com. Ukrainian Military Pages. 2019-10-29. Archived from the original on 29 October 2019.
