= 34th Kherson Regiment (Ukraine) =

34th Separate Regiment
- 34-й окремий Херсонський полк (Ukrainian)
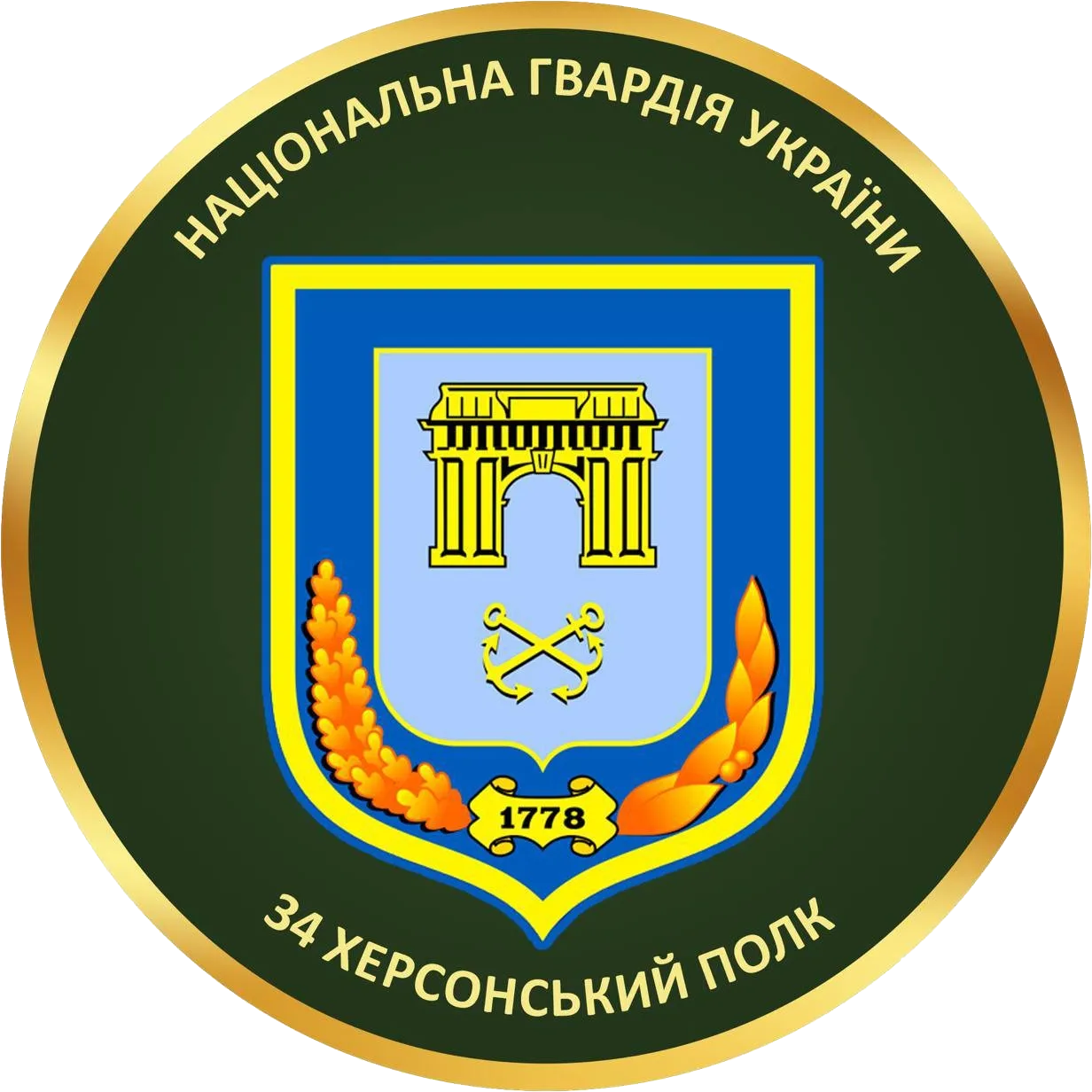
- Regiment Insignia
- Founded: 1992
- Country: Ukraine
- Allegiance: Ministry of Internal Affairs
- Branch: National Guard of Ukraine
- Type: Regiment
- Role: Law enforcement, transport, Protection of Ukrainian territorial integrity amongst others
- Part of: National Guard of Ukraine
- Garrison/HQ: Kherson
- Nickname: Kherson
- Engagements: Russo-Ukrainian war: War in Donbas; Battle of the Border; Battle of Mariupol; Russian invasion of Ukraine; Battle of Kherson
- Decorations: For Courage and Bravery

Commanders
- Current commander: Colonel Ruslan Oleksandrovich Kuzmich

The 34th Kherson Regiment is a regiment of the National Guard of Ukraine tasked with patrol, reconnaissance, law enforcement and protection of Ukrainian territorial integrity. It was established as the 8th separate battalion of the on the basis of the 131st Separate Special Motorized Police Battalion in 1992. It is headquartered in Kherson.

== History ==
It was established on 2 January 1992, as the 8th separate battalion of the on the basis of the 131st Separate Special Motorized Police Battalion of the Internal Troops of the Soviet Union as a part of the National Guard of Ukraine which was transferred to the Internal Troops of Ukraine becoming its 16th Separate Special Motorized Battalion on 20 January 1995. In 2014, it was transferred to the National Guard of Ukraine following its reestablishment.

It took part in the War in Donbass seeing combat on multiple occasions. On 13 August 2014, separatists shelled its positions in Upsenka killing a soldier of the battalion (Stadnyk Serhii Anatoliyovych) as a result of an explosion that wounded some other personnel as well. During the Battle of the Border, on 24 August 2014, a convoy of the regiment's personnel was ambushed by separatists near Novozvanivka killing a soldier of the battalion (Maksym Volodymyrovych Baranov) in addition to two soldiers from the 23rd Public Order Brigade, moreover in total 25 soldiers were captured by separatists.

It took part in the Battle of Mariupol during which on 24 January 2015, BM-21 Grad MLRS attacked a checkpoint of the National Guard near Mariupol in the village of Vynohradny. A soldier of the battalion (Mykolaichuk Dmytro Vasyliovych) was killed, another wounded, several residential buildings, power lines, and a gas station were also destroyed in the village.

On 31 October 2018, a soldier of the brigade (Davydok Andrii Olegovich) died from severe wounds in a hospital.

During the Russian invasion of Ukraine, the Battalion took part in the Battle of Kherson during which a soldier of the brigade (Oleksiy Ivanovych Khvostyk) was killed on 24 February 2022 at the start of invasion.

In December 2023, the battalion was expanded to a regiment, and became the 34th Kherson regiment of the National Guard of Ukraine.

On 28 June 2025, Constitution Day, the unit was awarded the Presidential Award For Courage and Bravery by the President of Ukraine Volodymyr Zelenskyy.

== Structure ==
The structure of the regiment is as follows:

- 1st Patrol Company
- 2nd Patrol Company
- 4th Rifle Company
- Automobile Company
- Cynological Group
- Medical Center

== Commanders ==
- Colonel Serhii Mykolayovych Vakulenko (?-2020)
- Colonel Ruslan Oleksandrovich Kuzmich (2020-)
