= 4th Kruk Battalion =

4th Separate Kruk Battalion
- 4-й батальйон оперативного призначення НГУ «Крук» (Ukrainian)
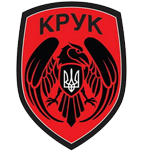
- Battalion Insignia
- Founded: 2014
- Country: Ukraine
- Allegiance: Ministry of Internal Affairs
- Branch: National Guard of Ukraine
- Type: Regiment
- Role: Multipurpose
- Part of: 50th Vysochan Regiment
- Garrison/HQ: Ivano-Frankivsk
- Nickname: Ravens
- Engagements: Russo-Ukrainian war: War in Donbas; Russian invasion of Ukraine

Commanders
- Current commander: Lieutenant Colonel Serhiy Shulyak

Insignia
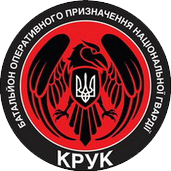
- Former Insignia (2015)

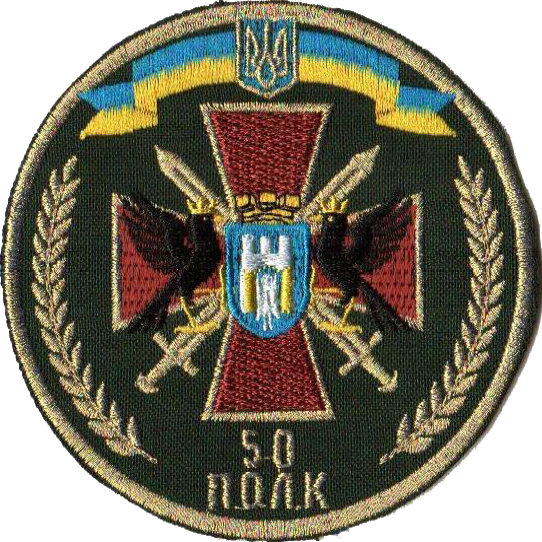
- Former Insignia (2014)

The 4th Separate "Kruk" Battalion is a separate volunteer battalion of the 50th Vysochan Regiment of the National Guard of Ukraine tasked with special operations, combat assistance, law enforcement and protection of Ukrainian territorial integrity. It was established in 2014 by the order of Stepan Poltorak. Its headquarters are located at the garrison of the 50th Regiment in Ivano-Frankivsk.

== History ==
On 19 June 2014, the commander of the National Guard of Ukraine, Stepan Poltorak initiated the process of formation of the 4th Separate Battalion. Its establishment process was completed on 8 August 2014 and received the informal name "Kruk" in Ivano-Frankivsk with its headquarters on Chornovola Street and it became a part of the 50th National Guard Regiment.

The battalion included around a hundred personnel from all parts of Ukraine included those from the occupied Territories of Crimea and Donbass. Serhii Shulyak, commander of the battalion said: "The protection of the Motherland is the business of the entire population of Ukraine. In my battalion there are representatives of the Crimea, the East, and central Ukraine. And it pleases me".

At the end of August, the "Kruk" battalion was deployed to fight in the War in Donbass in Popasna for 45 days returning to base on 5 October 2014. On 27 October, the "Kruk" battalion was on the frontlines in the Luhansk Oblast and to be redeployed for rest and replenishment. Six servicemen of the battalion were wounded as a result of separatist shelling on Popasna.

In the city, we maintained public order, carried out combat duty at checkpoints, and had to repeatedly engage in battle with separatists and Russian mercenaries. Our units often came under fire from "hail", mortars, and artillery. Thank God, there are no casualties in our battalion. After treatment, together with his fellow battalion members, he is again ready to defend his Motherland and go into battle against the Russian aggressor. Until the Ukrainian troops defeat the enemy and peace is established, we are ready to defend our native land, our family and all of Ukraine with weapons in our hands, fulfilling our sacred duty.

The battalion saw a combat deployment in Krymskye, guarding the pontoon crossing over the Donets, held positions in the suburb of Popasna after its liberation, served at strongholds and checkpoints near Bakhmut. At the beginning of October 2015, the battalion saw its fourth deployment in Popasna Raion aimed specifically at anti-smuggling operations and foiled 12 smuggling attempts.

The battalion also received a lot of volunteer assistance from individuals, as well as Ivano Frankivsk enterprises and public organizations. The NGO "Public Initiative of Galicia" provided food aid to the battalion, the "Frankivsk Construction Center" company handed over six solid fuel field stoves for the battalion, the NGO "Ivano-Frankivsk City Association of Passenger Carriers" purchased radio communication equipment, entrepreneur Roman Reznyk donated field uniforms and a UAV was transferred by the "Union of Ukrainian Women of Scandinavia", Stepan Yevych, another entrepreneur from United Kingdom transferred a combat medical vehicle. The Brotherhood of the Cossack Combat Custom "Spas" also provided manpower support to the battalion in the form of volunteers.

It saw combat during the Russian invasion of Ukraine with a soldier (Yaroslav Petrovych Korop) being killed on 13 April 2024 while serving on the frontlines.

== Commanders ==
- Lieutenant Colonel Serhiy Shulyak

== Sources ==
External videos
- 1. В Нацгвардії розпочато формування четвертого резервного батальйону
- 2. Батальйон оперативного реагування «Крук» запрошує добровольців ставати у їхні ряди
- 3. На Прикарпаття повернувся 4-й батальйон Національної гвардії «Крук»
- 4. Франківці дякують бійцям батальйону «Крук»
- 5. Васильчук і батальйон «Крук», UBR новини
- 6. Про війну на Донбасі розповів командир батальйону «Крук»

- 4 Батальйон оперативного призначення Національної гвардії України у Фейсбуці, 20 грудня 2014
- В Івано-Франківську командування 4-го батальйону Нацгвардії шукає добровольців
- Як живе і воює прикарпатський батальйон «Крук» (фоторепортаж)
- 4-й батальйон Національної гвардії «Крук» повернувся до Івано-Франківська (фото)
