= 38th Anti-aircraft Missile Regiment (Ukraine) =

- 38-й зенітний ракетний полк
- Founded: 2016
- Country: Ukraine
- Allegiance: Ministry of Defence
- Branch: Ukrainian Ground Forces
- Type: Brigade
- Role: Air Defense Artillery
- Part of: Operational Command South
- Garrison/HQ: Chornomorske, Odesa Oblast
- Nickname: named after Colonel-General Yury Tyutyunnyk
- Patron: Yuriy Tyutyunnyk
- Motto: Vector of victory
- Engagements: Russo-Ukrainian War; War in Donbass; Russian invasion of Ukraine
- Decorations: For Courage and Bravery

Commanders
- Current commander: Colonel Roman Zhivotchenko

Insignia
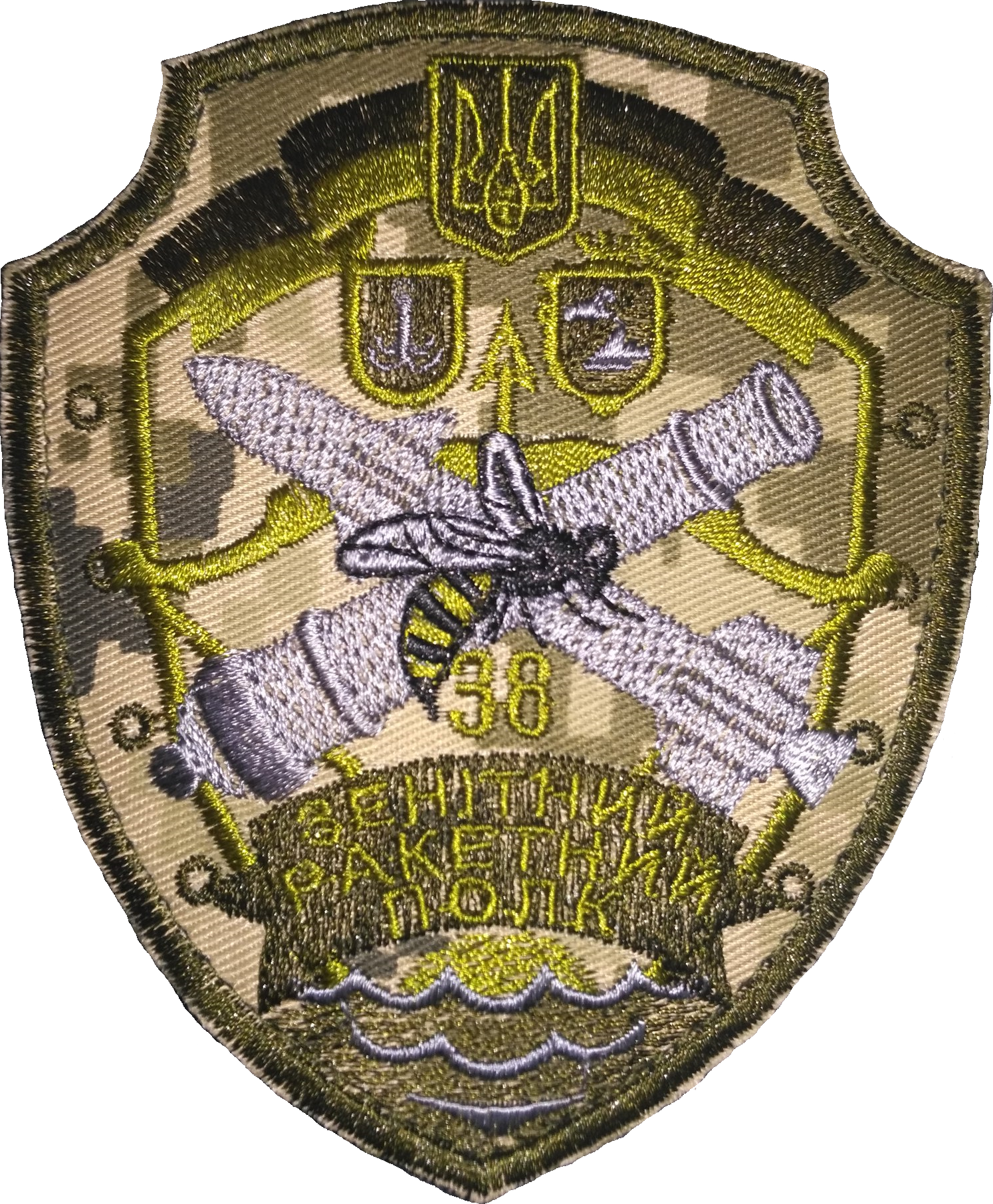
- Former Insignia

The 38th Anti-Aircraft Missile Regiment named after Colonel-General Yury Tyutyunnyk (MUN A3880) is a regiment level military unit of the Ukrainian Ground Forces, operationally under the command of Operational Command South. The Regiment is based in Chornomorske. It was established in 2016 and has seen combat during both the War in Donbass and the Russian invasion of Ukraine.

== History ==
In August 2016, the 2nd Anti-Aircraft Missile Divizion of the 1039th Anti-Aircraft Missile Regiment was fully deployed to Kherson Oblast, where it was expanded to the new 38th Anti-Aircraft Missile Regiment headquartered in Chornomorske and its establishment was completed on 10 September 2016. In January 2017, it conducted exercise in coordination with artillery forces and again in October 2017 before leaving for the ATO zone in December 2017 for duty in Memryk, Valeriyanivka, Uspenivka, Volnovakha and other settlements. On 28 January 2018, a soldier of the regiment (Mospan Valeriy Valeriyovych) died while performing his duties in Volnovakha. On 23 August 2021, the regiment was awarded the honorary name "Colonel General Yuriy Tyutyunnyk". On 12 January 2022, the regiment returned to Chornomorske following a six-month deployment.

On 26 February 2022, a soldier of the brigade (Kostenko Artem Volodymyrovych) was killed during the Battle of Kharkiv. On 24 April 2022, the regiment destroyed a Russian helicopter. On 8 May 2022, a soldier of the regiment (Dobrov Danylo Yuriyovych) was killed while repelling missile strikes on Odessa. On 17 August 2022, three soldiers of the brigade (Solovyov Dmitry Andriyovych, Marchenko Mykola Vasyliovych and Oleg Igorovich Umalyonov) came under Russian missile fire while performing a combat mission to protect the airspace near Krasnivka and were all killed, all three were posthumously awarded the Order for Courage 3rd degree. A soldier of the regiment (Igor Krivonosov) died as a result of wounds sustained in battle on 27 August 2023 in a hospital in Mykolaiv.In August 2023, a container based cargo Mobile tire assembly complex was crowd funded and donated to the regiment to enable on spot repairs of damaged equipment. On 27 December 2023, a soldier of the regiment (Vicktor Mykolayovich Storozhuk) was killed in action in Kherson Oblast.

On 11 April 2024, the regiment's mobile fire group destroyed a Russian Shahed drone using a Stinger missile. The regiment has been amongst the best units to regularly take down Russian Shahed drones employing American FIM-92 Stinger, the Turkish Canik M2 QCB heavy machine guns and the Soviet 9K38 Igla for such operations. On 30 September 2024, the regiment was awarded the honorary award "For Courage and Bravery". In September 2024, it was armed and equipped with Interceptor drones.

On 6 December 2024 the unit was awarded the honorary award For Courage and Bravery by the President of Ukraine Volodymyr Zelenskyy.

In February 2025, the regiment received trailer mounted French Crotale air defense systems.

== Equipment ==
Model	Image	Origin	Type	Number	Details
SAM sites
9K33 Osa		Soviet Union	Low-altitude, short-range tactical surface-to-air missile system		
Crotale		France	All-weather, short-range surface-to-air missile system	2+	
MANPADS
9K38 Igla		Soviet Union	Man-portable infrared homing surface-to-air missile		
FIM-92 Stinger		United States	Man-portable infrared homing surface-to-air missile		
Machine guns
Canik M2 QCB		Turkey	Heavy machine guns		

== Commanders ==
- Colonel Savenkov Igor Valeriyovych (2016-2020)
- Colonel Roman Zhivotchenko (2020-)
