= 50th Vysochan Regiment (Ukraine) =

50th Separate Regiment
- 50-й полк НГ (Ukrainian)
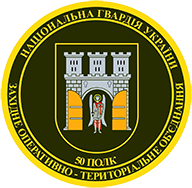
- Regiment Insignia
- Founded: 1993
- Country: Ukraine
- Allegiance: Ministry of Internal Affairs
- Branch: National Guard of Ukraine
- Type: Regiment
- Role: Multipurpose
- Part of: National Guard of Ukraine
- Garrison/HQ: Ivano-Frankivsk Oblast and Chernivtsi Oblast
- Nickname: Semen Hnatovych Vysochan
- Patron: Semen Hnatovych Vysochan
- Engagements: Russo-Ukrainian war: War in Donbas; Russian invasion of Ukraine; Eastern Ukraine campaign
- Decorations: For Courage and Bravery

Commanders
- Current commander: Colonel Vadym Linevskyi

The 50th Separate "Semen Hnatovych Vysochan" Regiment" is a regiment of the National Guard of Ukraine tasked with special purpose operations, law enforcement, anti-criminal operations, anti-smuggling operations, mountain patrols and protection of Ukrainian territorial integrity. It was established as the 12th Separate Battalion in 1993. Its units are stationed throughout Ivano-Frankivsk Oblast and Chernivtsi Oblast.

== Name ==
The unit is named after Semen Vysochan, a rebel from Pokutia, who in 1648 joined Bohdan Khmelnytskyi's Zaporozhian Cossacks and in 1651 took part in the defence of Vinnytsia along with Ivan Bohun, later serving as the colonel of Lysianka and in 1666 being exiled to Muscovy.

== History ==
On 26 June 1993, it was established as the 12th Separate Battalion in Ivano-Frankivsk Oblast, headquartered at the Ivano-Frankivsk Regional Military Commissariat, and in 1998 it was transferred to the barracks of the former Construction Battalion. In 1996, it was reformed into the 24th Regiment consisting of a Mechanized and a motorized battalion, performing tasks on the border with Moldova. In 1998, it was reformed into the 24th Separate Battalion by spearing its motorized battalion. In 1999, it was transferred to the Internal Troops of Ukraine. In June 2001, the personnel of the battalion provided protection to Pope John Paul II during his visit to Lviv. In June 2002, the 5th Rifle Company in Chernivtsi was transferred to the battalion. In November–December 2004, the personnel of the battalion maintained public order in the aftermath of the 2004 Ukrainian presidential election. From May to July 2006, the battalion carried out a special operation codenamed "Operation Siren" to arrest criminals in the city of Tysmenytsia and the village of Polyanytsia in Ivano-Frankivsk Oblast. From December 2006 - July 2007, the battalion carried out the "Operation Border" in the Chernivtsi Oblast, preventing smuggling of contraband goods and conducted special operations to search for criminals. In July 2008, the personnel of the unit performed search and rescue operations after the flood in the Ivano-Frankivsk and Chernivtsi Oblasts.

After the reformation of the National Guard of Ukraine, it became a part of it as the 50th "Semen Hnatovych Vysochan" Regiment in 2014. It saw relatively limited combat during the War in Donbass with an officer (Viktor Mykolayovych Redkyn) being killed on 1 November 2014 and a soldier (Logunov Roman Vasyliovych) being killed on 6 September 2015.

It also saw action during the Russian invasion of Ukraine in Luhansk Oblast with a soldier (Andriy Tymofiychuk) being killed on 29 March 2023 in Shypylivka another (Spolovich Roman Stepanovych) on 30 March and a third soldier (Yury Yaroslavovych Jus) being killed on 1 April.

On 28 June 2025, Constitution Day, the unit was awarded the Presidential Award For Courage and Bravery by the President of Ukraine Volodymyr Zelenskyy.

== Structure ==
The structure of the regiment is as follows:

- 50th Vysochan Regiment
  - 1st Rifle Company
  - 2nd Rifle Company (Chernivtsi)
  - 3rd Patrol Company (Kalush)
  - 4th Separate Battalion "Kruk" (Ivano-Frankivsk)
  - 5th Mountain Patrol Company
  - 6th Mountain Patrol Company
  - Reserve Rifle Company

== Commanders ==
- Colonel Ihor Kurach
- Colonel Roman Naumenko (2017-?)
- Colonel Vadym Linevskyi (?-)

== Sources ==
- "Нацгвардія планує сформувати на Прикарпатті два гірських підрозділи та навчальний центр". ukrmilitary.com. Ukrainian Military Pages. 2016-03-04. Archived from the original on 22 May 2017.
- Гвардійці Прикарпаття взяли участь у правовому заході «Я маю право»
- "Бійці НГУ приступили до спільної з ДПСУ охорони кордону на Буковині". mil.in.ua/. Ukrainian military portal. 2018-01-24. Archived from the original on 25 January 2018.
- Гвардійці допомагають прикордонникам охороняти державний кордон України в Чернівецькій області
