= 15th National Guard Battalion (Ukraine) =

15th Separate Battalion
- 15-й окремий батальйон НГ (Ukrainian)
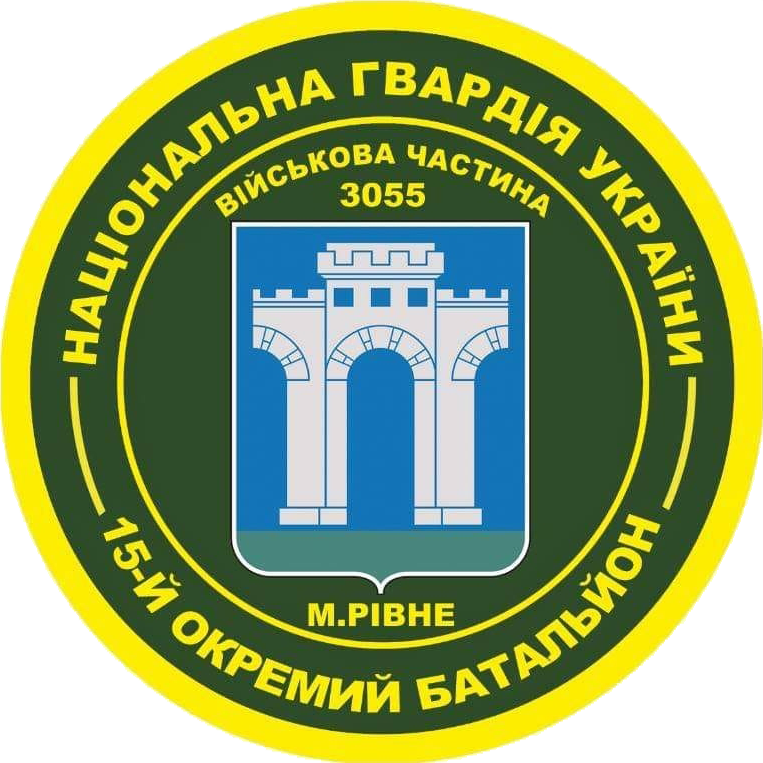
- Battalion Insignia
- Founded: 1995
- Country: Ukraine
- Allegiance: Ministry of Internal Affairs
- Branch: National Guard of Ukraine
- Type: Battalion
- Role: Transport
- Part of: 2nd Galician Brigade
- Garrison/HQ: Rivne and Sarny
- Engagements: Russo-Ukrainian war: War in Donbas; Russian invasion of Ukraine

Commanders
- Current commander: Lieutenant Colonel Vitaly Ivanovych Opolsky
- Notable commanders: Lieutenant Colonel Anatoly Leonidovych Miroshnychenko

The 15th Separate National Guard Battalion is a battalion of the 2nd Galician Brigade of the National Guard of Ukraine tasked with transport and escort of convicts and prisoners as well as the protection of public law and order and the Ukrainian territorial integrity. It was established in 1995 in Crimea but after the capture of its headquarters it was abolished and was reestablished in 2018 in Rivne.

== History ==
It was established on 11 August 1995 in Yevpatoria in the Autonomous Republic of Crimea to ensure reliable public order and law enforcement during the Crimean crisis as a part of the Internal Troops of Ukraine. Its area of operations were Evpatoria, Saky, Chornomorske and Rozdolne. Lieutenant Colonel Miroshnychenko Anatoly Leonidovich was appointed as its commander and the infrastructure of the Russian Guards Cadre Regiment of the then shared Black Sea Fleet was inducted into the battalion. The building the historical Hotel "Aureole", established in 1908, became its headquarters. Its establishment was completed on 6 January 1996, and from 28 April 1996, it was deployed to Patrol 20 routes of Yevpatoria. During the holiday season, five times more personnel were deployed on duty due to the city of Yevpatoria being a resort and tourism hub. In January 1998, after the breach of Lake Sasyk-Sivash dam, the village of the Silprom was flooded, so the battalion carried out search and rescue and evacuation missions. In December 2005, the battalion carried out implementation of quarantine and restrictive measures to control Avian flu in Chornomorske. In December 2008, the battalion carried out search and rescue operations in Yevpatoria, in the aftermath of the collapse of a multistory building complex.

Following the Russian invasion of Crimea, the battalion's headquarters were captured by the Russian forces leading to the disbandment of the Battalion.

In August 2018, it was reestablished on the basis of the 3rd battalion of the 2nd Galician Brigade, becoming a part of the 2nd Brigade. It is currently headquartered in Rivne with a separate Patrol Company being garrisoned in Sarny.

The battalion saw combat during the Russian invasion of Ukraine. On 14 March 2022, Russian aircraft struck the Rivne TV Tower building in the village of Antopil, using an air-to-ground missile, killing a soldier (Gennady Mykhailovych Levchenko) of the battalion.

== Structure ==
The structure of the battalion is as follows:

- Battalion Headquarters
- Rifle Company
- Patrol Company
- Operational Assignment Company (Sarny)
- Guardian Units

== Commanders ==
- Lieutenant Colonel Anatoly Leonidovych Miroshnychenko (1995-?)
- Lieutenant Colonel Anatoly Kovalenko (?-2014)
- Lieutenant Colonel Serhii Lukyanchikov (2018-?)
- Lieutenant Colonel Vitaly Ivanovych Opolsky (?-)

== Sources ==
- До рівненського батальйону Нацгвардії завітали ветерани
- У Рівному створили нову військову частину Нацгвардії
