= Hart Brigade =

1st Mobile Border Guard Detachment "Hart"
- 1-й мобільний прикордонний загін "Гарт" (Ukrainian)
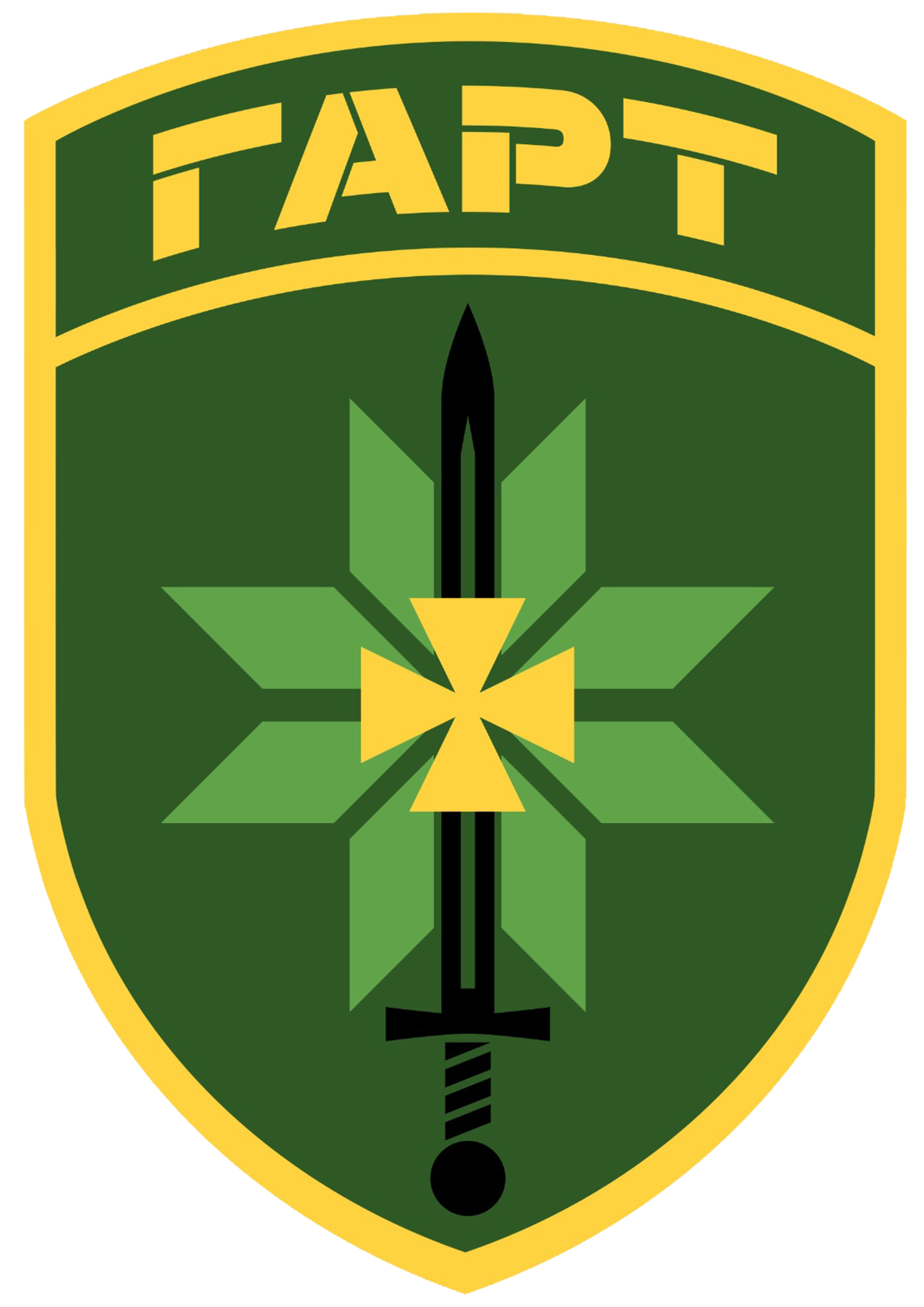
- Brigade Insignia
- Founded: 2024
- Country: Ukraine
- Allegiance: Ministry of Internal Affairs
- Branch: Offensive Guard
- Type: Brigade
- Role: Mechanized Infantry
- Part of: State Border Guard Service of Ukraine
- Garrison/HQ: Mariupol
- Nickname: Hardened
- Engagements: Russo-Ukrainian war: War in Donbass; Battle of Mariupol; Fights on the Ukrainian–Russian border (2014); Russian invasion of Ukraine; Eastern Ukraine campaign; Siege of Mariupol; Battle of Marinka; Battle of Lysychansk; Battle of Bakhmut; 2024 Kharkiv offensive
- Decorations: For Courage and Bravery

Commanders
- Current commander: Colonel Volodymyr Chervonenko

Insignia
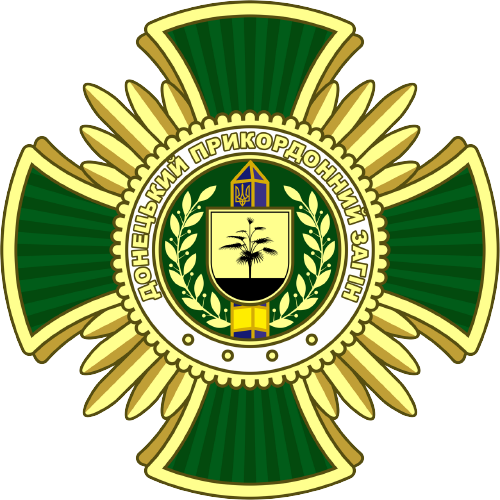
- Former Insignia

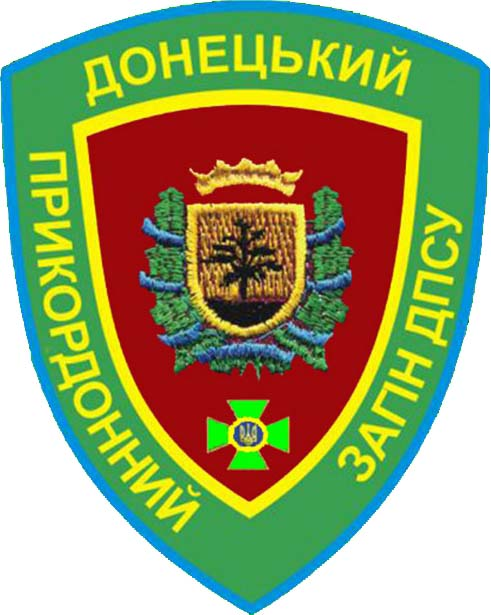
- Former Insignia

The 1st Mobile Border Guard Detachment "Hart" also known as the Hart Brigade (Ukrainian: Гарт, lit. 'tempering, hardening') is an assault brigade of the Offensive Guard.

It is the third brigade established within the State Border Guard Service of Ukraine, following the Revenge and Steel Border brigades.

== History ==
=== Early history ===
It was established in 1993 on the basis of the Mariupol checkpoint as the Donetsk border control unit. It was reorganized into the Donetsk border detachment in 2000.

=== War in Donbass ===
During the War in Donbass, it saw combat on multiple occasions. On 14 June 2014, the detachment saw combat during the Battle of Mariupol suffering some wounded. The Novoazovsk checkpost of the detachment came under attack by separatists from 2 to 3 July 2014, during its defense, a guardsman of the detachment (Volodymyr Mykolayovych Presnyakov) was killed in combat on 2 July 2014, and another guardsman (Oleg Mykolayovych Semenovskyi) was killed in combat the next day. On 5 July 2014, 15 separatists on 2 small watercraft landed on the coast of the Sea of Azov in Siedove near a maritime observation post of the detachment and attacked the post with small arms and mortars killing a guardsman of the detachment (Oleksandr Volodymyrovych Kovalev) and wounding eight more, after a fierce battle, the separatists were forced to retreat. Amongst the wounded, a guardsman (Oleksiy Viktorovych Tsygankov) later died of his injuries on 9 July 2014. On 31 July 2014, during the Battle at the border, a separatist sabotage and reconnaissance group attacked the detachment's position near Vasylivka with mortars and grenade launcher, as a result of which, four soldiers of the detachment (Oleksandr Oleksandrovich Basak, Oleg Volodymyrovych Parshutin, Chernomorchenko Rostislav Oleksandrovych, Yurii Volodymyrovych Filippovskyi) were killed in action and eleven more were wounded. On 7 August 2014, a UAZ vehicle of the detachment ran into a radio-controlled explosive device near the Uspenka checkpoint, a guardsman of the detachment (Matvienko Andrii Vitaliyovych) and killed and some others were wounded. On 14 August 2014, the bridge in Uspenka was attacked by separatists coming from Stepne at night resulting in the death of a guardsman of the detachment (Dyumin Roman Viktorovych) and wounding of several more. On 23 August 2014, the detachment attacked KamAZ truck with personnel and 2 KamAZ trucks with weapons and ammunition moving in a convoy accompanied by two armored personnel carriers from the Russian Federation, destroying all three trucks, two guardsmen of the detachment (Mykola Leonidovych Nikolenko and Oleksiy Leonidovych Vasylchenko) were also killed.

=== Russian invasion of Ukraine ===
Following the Russian invasion of Ukraine, the detachment engaged Russian forces on multiple occasions. It took part in the Battle of Marinka during which on 19 March 2022, a guardsman of the detachment (Herbin Mykola Valentinovych) was killed in combat. Lieutenant Colonel Dominyuk Leonid Anatoliyovych, head of the commandant's department of the Donetsk border detachment of was killed in action on 17 April 2022 during the Siege of Mariupol. On 24 April 2022, a guardsman of the detachment (Serhiy Nenashev) was killed in action during the Battle of Lysychansk. On 7 May 2022, a guardsman of the detachment was killed in Azovstal during the Siege of Mariupol and was posthumously awarded the Hero of Ukraine. On 8 May 2022, another guardsman of the detachment (Shumenko Vadym Oleksandrovich) was killed as a result of an airstrike on Azovstal. On 27 July 2022, it was awarded the honorary award "For Courage and Bravery". A guardsman of the detachment (Kerod Stanislav Olegovich) was captured by Russian forces in Mariupol and was released on 6 December 2022.

On 30 March 2023, a guardsman of the detachment (Vitaly Mykolayovych Hnatushok) was killed while performing a combat mission during the Battle of Bakhmut.

The Donetsk Border Detachment was reformed into the Hart Brigade on 30 April 2024, on the Day of the Border Guard of Ukraine. The Hart Brigade joined the Offensive Guard. The Hart Brigade has been actively engaged in combat against Russia, including repelling the Russian assault on the city of Vovchansk (Kharkiv region).

On 16 September 2024, two guardsmen of the brigade (Oleksiy Kornienko and Lesyk Roman) were killed in action.

== Equipment ==
The brigade actively uses equipment provided to Ukraine by foreign partners. Specifically, it is equipped with Roshel MRAPs manufactured in Canada as well as AIVF-B-FUS IFVs and AIFV-B-C25 APCs.

Type	Image	Origin	Class	Notes
Vehicles
Roshel Senator		Canada	MRAP	Donated by Canada.
AIVF-B-FUS		United States	IFV	Donated by Belgium
AIFV-B-C25		United States	APC	

== Structure ==
Before the start of the War in Donbass and the proclamation of Donetsk People's Republic, its structure was composed of:

- Management and Headquarters (Mariupol)
- Border Service Department "Donetsk" (type A)
- Border Service Department "Ilovaisk" (type A)
- Border Service Department "Mariupol" (Type B)
- Border Service Department "Novoazovsk" (type B)
- Border Service Department "Amvrosiivka" (type B)
- Border Service Department "Dmytrivka" (type B)
- Marine Guard vessels Division
- Mobile Border Outpost
- Five Border posts
- Two Inspection posts
- Guardian units

But following the occupation of border territories in Donetsk Oblast, its structure was altered:

- Management and Headquarters
- Border Service Department "Yalta"
- Border Service Department "Mariupol"
- Separate Combat border Command Post "Sartana"
- Separate Combat border Command Post "Volnovakha"
- Mobile Border Post "Mariupol"
- Separate Anti-aircraft Artillery Outpost
- Guardian units

== Commanders ==
- Colonel Machekhin M. E. (1992)
- Colonel Kurdin M. F. (1992–1998)
- Colonel Sabadash A. AND. (1998–2002)
- Lieutenant Colonel Danylko I. D. (2002–2005)
- Colonel Lutsky O. L. (2005–2006)
- Colonel Vasyankin I. U. (2006–2008)
- Colonel Shablii M. D. (2008–2010)
- Colonel Purgin D. N. (2010–2012)
- Colonel Lysyuk Yu. AT. (2012–2015)
- Colonel Chornopishchuk I. M. (2015–2018)
- Colonel Kotsyurba A. T. (2018-)

== Tasks ==
The detachment was entrusted with the task of protecting the Russo-Ukrainian border in Donetsk Oblast with a total length of 310.5 kilometers, 178.5 kilometers on land, and 132 kilometers maritime along the Sea of Azov.

== Sources ==
- Донецький прикордонний загін Ukrainian Military Pages
- Донецький прикордонний загін Державної прикордонної служби України
