= 1039th Anti-aircraft Missile Regiment (Ukraine) =

- 1039-й зенітний ракетний полк
- Founded: 1953
- Country: Ukraine; Soviet Union (1953–1991)
- Allegiance: Armed Forces of Ukraine
- Branch: Ukrainian Ground Forces
- Type: Air Defense Troops
- Role: Air Defense
- Size: Regiment
- Part of: Operational Command East
- Garrison/HQ: Hvardiiske, Dnipropetrovsk Oblast
- Nickname: General-Cornet Mykola Kapustiansky
- Patron: Mykola Kapustiansky
- Engagements: Russo-Ukrainian War; War in Donbass; Russian invasion of Ukraine; Northern Ukraine campaign; Eastern Ukraine campaign
- Decorations: For Courage and Bravery
- Website: Official Facebook page

Commanders
- Current commander: Colonel Ihor Malynko

Insignia
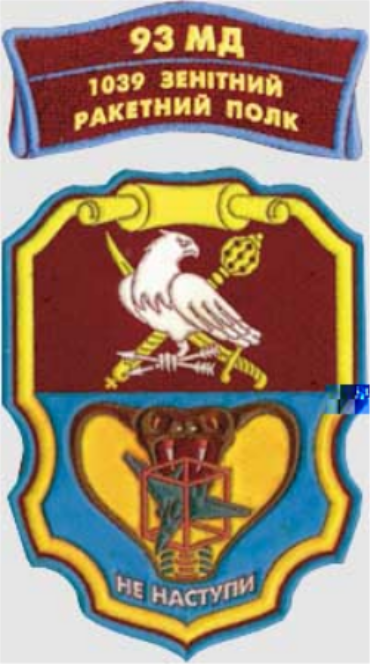
- Former Insignia

The 1039th Anti-Aircraft Missile Regiment General-Cornet Mykola Kapustiansky (MUN A1964) is a regiment level military unit of the Ukrainian Ground Forces, operationally under the command of Operational Command East. The Regiment is based in Zarichne, Dnipropetrovsk Oblast. It has seen combat during both the War in Donbass and the Russian invasion of Ukraine operating a variety of equipment.

== History ==
The regiment traces its history back to a part of the Soviet Army, being created in November 1953.

In August 2008, the regiment was preparing for military exercises near Feodosia.

It saw combat during the War in Donbass. On 31 July 2015, Ruslan Ivanovich Batyr, a soldier of the 1039th Regiment, was killed by separatist fire near Avdiivka. On 10 September 2016, the 38th Anti-Aircraft Missile Regiment was formed on the basis of the regiment's 2nd Anti-Aircraft Missile Division.

On 20 March 2022, a soldier of the regiment, Sushkov Viktor Alexandrovich was killed during the Battle of Okhtyrka, firstly being able to strike and damage a Russian plane but two hours later having his position struck by Russian aircraft. In October 2022, it received thanks from the President of Ukraine. In April 2024, it was performing Combat operations in Donetsk, Kharkiv and Luhansk Oblasts. On 12 December 2024, it was awarded the honorary title "Mykola Kapustiansky". In February 2025, the regiment showcased 2K12 Kub SAMs, 1S91M and associated equipment donated by Poland and Czech Republic in its operation. On 17 February 2025, it destroyed a Russian ZALA Lancet UAV in the air using an FPV drone.

On 14 March 2026 the unit was awarded the Presidential Award For Courage and Bravery by the President of Ukraine Volodymyr Zelenskyy.

== Equipment ==
Model	Image	Origin	Type	Number	Details
SAM sites
9K33 Osa		Soviet Union	Low-altitude, short-range tactical surface-to-air missile system		
2K12 Kub		Poland; Czech Republic	Mobile surface-to-air missile system, low to medium-level air defence system	2+	
Support Vehicles
BTR-60		Soviet Union	Command Vehicle		Modified into PU-12
PPRU-1		Soviet Union	Mobile reconnaissance and command center for tactical air defence systems		
1S91M		Soviet Union	Mobile Radar Reconnaissance Center		
MANPADS
9K38 Igla		Soviet Union	Man-portable infrared homing surface-to-air missile		
FIM-92 Stinger		United States	Man-portable infrared homing surface-to-air missile		

== Structure ==
The structure of the regiment is as follows:

- Management & Headquarters
- Regimental Command Post
- 1st Anti-Aircraft Missile Battery
- 2nd Anti-Aircraft Missile Battery
- 3rd Anti-Aircraft Missile Battery
- 4th Anti-Aircraft Missile Battery
- 5th Anti-Aircraft Missile Battery
- Technical Support Battery
- Logistics Platoon
- Repairment Platoon
- Commandant Platoon
