= Rivne TV Tower =

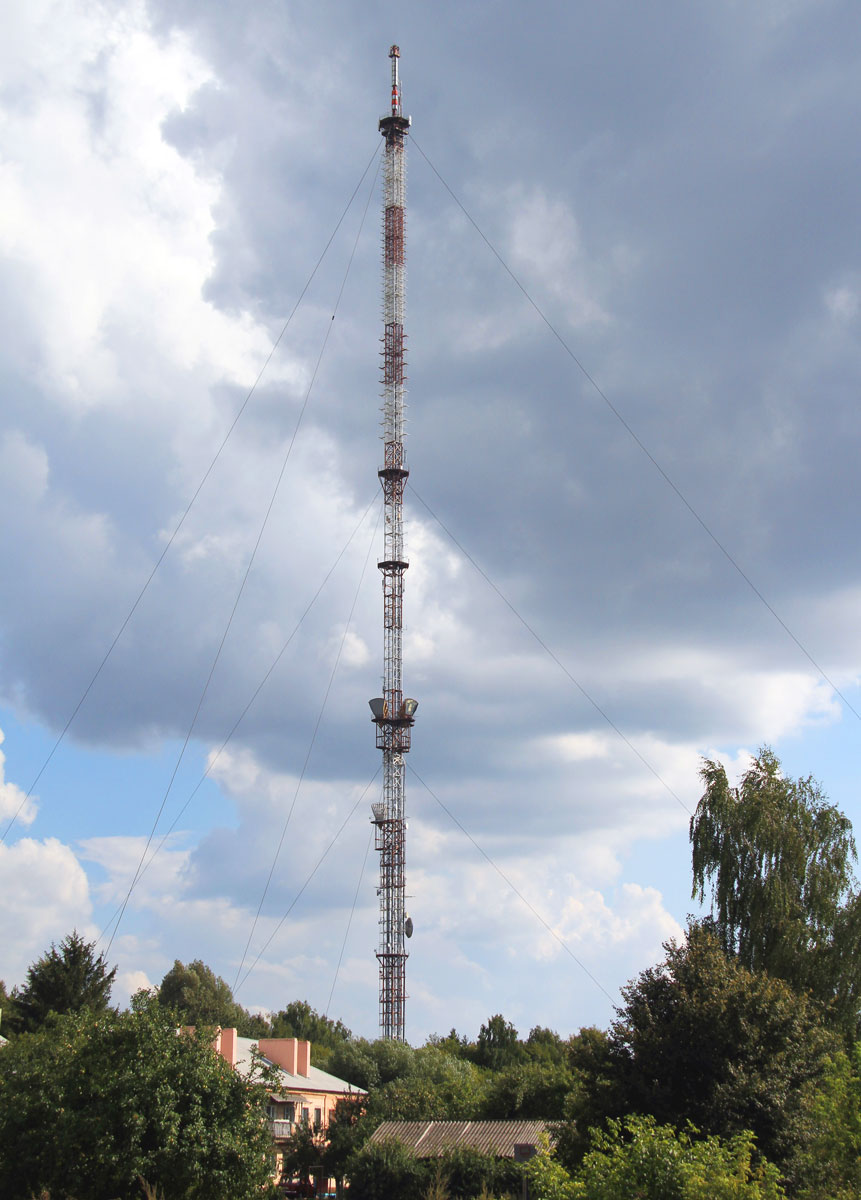
Rivne TV Tower

Rivne TV Tower is a steel-guyed television tower, located near the city of Rivne, Ukraine. The construction of TV tower was completed in 1967. It was built in the village of Antopil, approximately 15 km from the city of Rivne, in order not to interfere with the Rivne airport.

== History ==
In the early 1990s, there were three powerful television transmitters and four broadcasts, two of which worked in stereo mode. On 2 March 1992, the local TV channel 10th Channel began broadcasting. In November 1996, the first in the region commercial radio station Radio Track started broadcasting. TV tower provided coverage of broadcasting over 80 percent of the population of Rivne Oblast.

As a result of missile attack by Russian forces on 14 March 2022, the tower was damaged and an administrative room was destroyed. As a result of attack, 21 people were killed and nine injured.
