= Kharkiv Border Detachment =

4th Kharkiv Border Detachment
- 4-й Харківський прикордонний загін (Ukrainian)
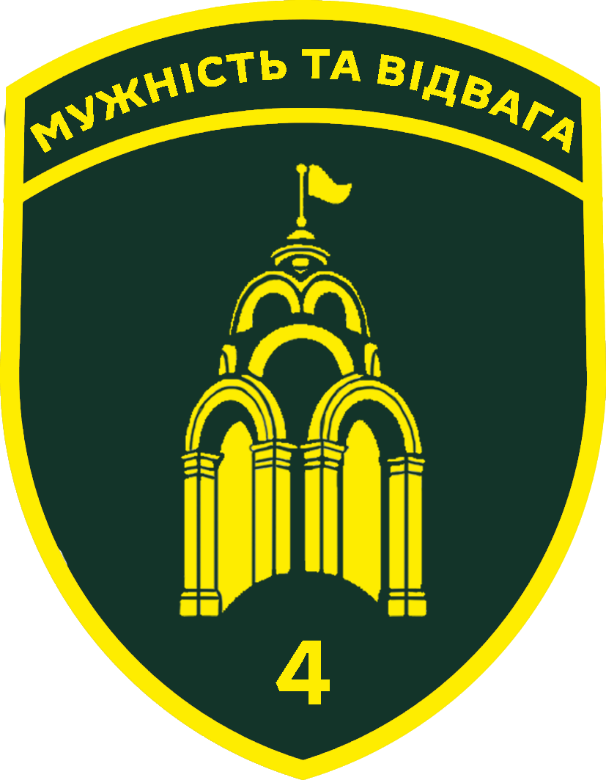
- Detachment Insignia
- Founded: 1992
- Country: Ukraine
- Allegiance: Ministry of Internal Affairs
- Branch: State Border Guard Service of Ukraine
- Type: Brigade
- Role: Border Guard
- Size: ~5000
- Part of: State Border Guard Service of Ukraine
- Garrison/HQ: Kharkiv
- Motto: First with honor
- Mascot: Wolf
- Engagements: Russo-Ukrainian war: Russian invasion of Ukraine; Eastern Ukraine campaign; Battle of Kharkiv (2022); 2022 Kharkiv counteroffensive; 2024 Kharkiv offensive
- Decorations: For Courage and Bravery

Commanders
- Current commander: Colonel Gots Roman Yevgeniyovych

The Kharkiv Border Detachment (MUN 9951) is a brigade level detachment of the Eastern Department of the State Border Service of Ukraine. The detachment guards the Russia-Ukraine border in four raions (Bohodukhiv Raion, Kharkiv Raion, Chuhuiv Raion and Kupiansk Raion) of Kharkiv Oblast as well as the Kharkiv International Airport and the Dnipro International Airport. The detachment guards border length of 315.5 km, including 7.5 km by water.

== History ==
On 20 October 1992, the Kharkiv Border Detachment was established, commanded by Colonel Ihor Vasyliovych Egorov.

It saw combat during the War in Donbass. On 16 July 2014, in a forest plantation near Stanytsia Luhanska, the personnel of the Kharkiv Detachment encountered a group of saboteurs trying to plant a landmine and two guardsmen of the detachment (Postolny Mykola Mykolayovych and Maxim Oleksandrovich Zakopaylo) were killed in resulting engagement.

During the Prelude to the Russian invasion of Ukraine, it acquired mortar training. It saw combat during multiple engagements during the Russian invasion of Ukraine. On the morning of 24 February 2022, at the start of the Russian invasion of Ukraine, a Russian tank column attacked a small squad of the detachment composed of 15-30 people who had no choice but to fight, and three guardsmen of the detachment (Dmytro Oleksiyovych Prokhorov, Maksym Nezola and Ivan Yakymchuk) were killed during the Battle of Kharkiv. On 11 February 2023, the 4th Kharkiv Border Detachment was awarded the honorary award "For Courage and Bravery". In April 2024, the detachment took part in the 2024 Kharkiv offensive and its SPG units continued to shell Russian positions. On 27 July 2024, the Quick Death unit of the Kharkiv Detachment destroyed a Russian MTLB. On 15 November 2024, the detachment destroyed a Russian ammunition warehouse and two shelters using Baba Yaga drone.

== Structure ==
The structure of the detachment is as follows:

- Management and Headquarters
- Border Service Department "Kharkiv"
- Border Service Department "Kharkiv International Airport"
- Border Service Department "Kharkiv-railway"
- Border Service Department "Kharkiv-passenger"
- Border Service Department "Dnipro International Airport"
- Border Service Department "Dergachi"
- Border Service Department "Vesele"
- Border Service Department "Vovchansk"
- Border Service Department "Kupiansk"
- Border Service Department "Timofiivka"
- Border Service Department "Topoli"
- Border Service Department "Kozacha Lopan"
- Border Service Department "Vilkhuvatka"
- Border Service Department "Zhovtneve"
- Border Service Department "Bily Kolodyaz"
- Border Service Department "Staritsa"
- Border Post "Zolochiv"
- Mobile Border Post "Kharkiv"
- Guardian Units

== Commanders ==
- Colonel Egorov Ihor Vasylyovych (1992–1994)
- Colonel Andreychenko Volodymyr Oleksandrovych (1995–2000)
- Lieutenant-Colonel Neroda Viktor Vasyliovych (2000–2003)
- Colonel Serhii Viktorovych Bidylo (2003–2006)
- Colonel Ihor Yuriyovych Vasyankin (8 September 2006 – 14 December 2006)
- Colonel Oleksandr Mykolayovych Zadorozhny (14 December 2006 – 2010)
- Colonel Viktor Ivanovich Melnychenko (2010-?)
- Lieutenant Colonel Oleksandr Ivanovych Kruk (2013–2015)
- Colonel Yuriy Oleksandrovych Zaitsev (2015–2017)
- Lieutenant Colonel Oleksandr Stepanovych Osadchuk (2017–2018)
- Colonel Gots Roman Yevgeniyovych (2019-)

== Structure ==
- Харківський прикордонний загін Державної прикордонної служби України
- ПРИКОРДОННИК УКРАЇНИ No. 40 (5342), 26 ЖОВТНЯ 2012 РОКУ
