= 23rd Public Order Brigade =

23rd Public Order Protection Brigade
- 23-тя окрема бригада охорони громадського порядку (Ukrainian)
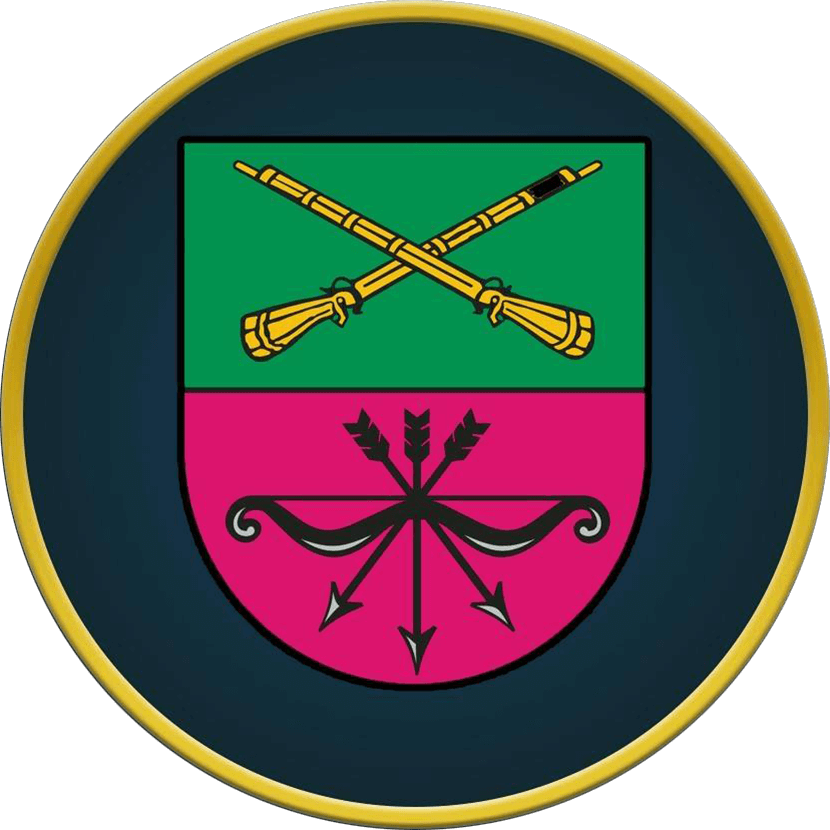
- Brigade Insignia
- Founded: 1992
- Country: Ukraine
- Allegiance: Ministry of Internal Affairs
- Branch: National Guard of Ukraine
- Type: Brigade
- Role: Law enforcement, protection of the Ukrainian territorial integrity
- Part of: National Guard of Ukraine
- Garrison/HQ: Zaporizhzhia, Melitopol, Berdyansk and Energodar
- Nickname: Khortytsia Brigade
- Anniversaries: 2 January
- Engagements: Russo-Ukrainian war: War in Donbas; Battle of the Border; Russian invasion of Ukraine; Siege of Mariupol

Commanders
- Notable commanders: Colonel Dmytro Oleksandrovich Apukhtin †

Insignia
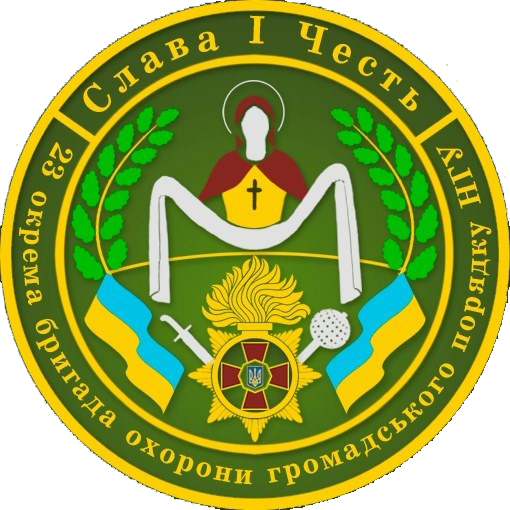
- Former Insignia

The 23rd Public Order Protection Brigade "Khortytsia" is a Brigade of the National Guard of Ukraine tasked with protection of the public order and the territorial integrity of Ukraine. It was established on January 2, 1992, as the 8th NG Regiment on the basis of the 22nd Separate Special Motorized Militia Battalion. It has seen combat during the War in Donbass and the Russian invasion of Ukraine. Its units are headquartered in Zaporizhzhia, Melitopol, Berdyansk and Energodar.

== History ==
It was established on January 2, 1992, on the basis of the 22nd Separate Special Motorized Militia Battalion of the Internal Troops of the Soviet Union, as the 8th regiment of the National Guard of Ukraine.

On 15 July 1992, on the Buyalyk-Berezivka route, a fight broke out in a train carriage when an inebriated man was clinging to the passengers starting a brawl. During the brawl, the man grabbed an F-1 grenade and threw it on the floor after pulling out its ring, an officer of the regiment (Volodymyr Fedorovych Ignatiev) covered it with his body, taking the impact on himself saving the other passengers but was killed in action.

On 26 January 1995, the 8th regiment of the National Guard of Ukraine was subordinated to the Internal Troops of Ukraine, where it was renamed the 13th Separate Special Motorized Regiment and then the 23rd Separate Special Motorized Brigade in 1999. It became a part of the National Guard of Ukraine in 2014.

It took part in multiple engagements during the War in Donbass. It took part in the Battle of the Border during which on 10 August 2014, in the darkness of night, the separatists attacked the regiment's post in Amvrosiivka, the regiment's observer (Gutnik-Zaluzhnyi Ivan Viktorovych) at the lookout position saw a group of unknown people on a thermal imager and reported them to the command and received an order to observe. The separatists saw him and opened fire, he retaliated by using tracer munitions which revealed the positions of separatists forcing them to retreat, thus the plans of an ambush by separatists were foiled and 48 personnel of the regiment were saved but the observer Gutnik-Zaluzhnyi Ivan Viktorovych, himself was severely wounded and died soon after. Also during the battle of the border, on 24 August 2014, a convoy of the regiment's personnel was ambushed by separatists near Novozvanivka killing two soldiers of the regiment (Borys Olegovich Gryaznov and Dobrovolskyi Serhiy Valeriyovych), furthermore 25 soldiers of the regiment were taken captive and a soldier from the 34th Kherson Regiment was also killed.

On 21 December 2017, a mini-soccer tournament was held at the Dynamo sports complex among the security forces of the Zaporizhzhia garrison, dedicated to the "Memory of Lieutenant Colonel Dmytro Andriyovych Davydenko." The first place was won by the team of the brigade against FC "Chepard".

On 21 August 2020, the brigade was awarded the honorary name " Khortytsia" and on 23 August 2020, the brigade was presented with a battle flag and ribbons.

During the Russian invasion of Ukraine, the brigade saw heavy action. It took part in the Siege of Mariupol. On 3 March 2022, an advanced Russian column was spotted by Colonel Dmytro Apukhtin, due to the early observation, the brigade was able to prepare, one Russian armored vehicles was destroyed. On 5 March 2022, the Russians again tried to break through the defenses and enter the city of Mariupol, when a battle broke out between the brigade and Russian soldiers, about 20 Russian soldiers were killed and two vehicles were destroyed during the battle. On 10 March 2022, the brigade ambushed Russian forces destroying two Russian BMP-2s.

On 12 March 2022, a Russian column attacked the brigade's positions killing the commander Colonel Dmytro Oleksandrovich Apukhtin who was awarded the Hero of Ukraine.

The commander of the 2nd patrol battalion of the brigade was killed on 19 March 2022 from a sniper's bullet in Mariupol. In March 2024, the Berdyansk Detachment in coordination with the Khortytsia Brigade destroyed a Russian Murom-M complex.

== Structure ==
The structure of the brigade is as follows:

- 23rd Public Order Protection Brigade
  - 1st patrol battalion (Zaporizhzhia)
    - 1st Patrol Company
    - 2nd Patrol Company
    - Automobile Company
  - 2nd patrol battalion (Melitopol)
    - 3rd Patrol Company
    - 4th Patrol Company
    - Automobile Company
    - Support Platoon
      - Communication Node
      - Canine group
  - 3rd Patrol Battalion (Berdyansk)
    - 5th Patrol Company
    - 6th Patrol Company
    - Automobile Company
    - Support Platoon
      - Communication Node
      - Canine group
  - 4th Patrol Battalion (Energodar)
    - 7th Patrol Company
    - 8th Patrol Company
    - Automobile Company
  - Automobile Support Battalion
  - Combat and Logistical Support Company
  - Orchestra

== Commanders ==
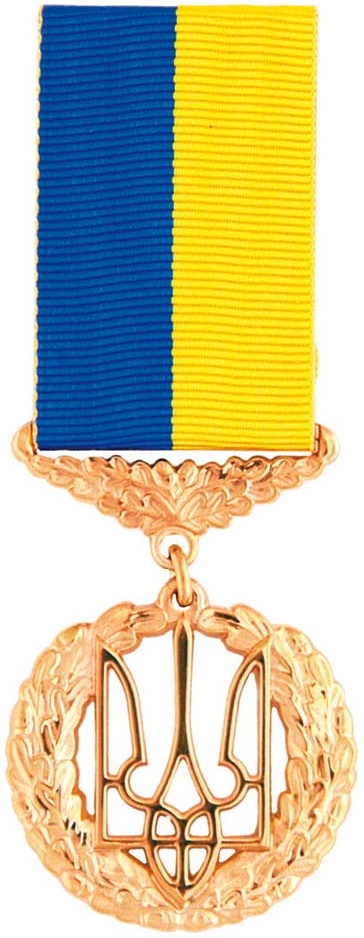
- Colonel Dmytro Oleksandrovich Apukhtin † (?-2022)

== Sources ==
- "Агітаційна робота у курортному місті Бердянську".
- "У Бердянську гвардійці затримали особливо небезпечного рецидивіста".
- "Національна гвардія охороняє заповідник "Хортиця"".
- "У військовій частині 3042 пройшли тактико-спеціальні навчання".
