= 2023 Ukrainian counteroffensive order of battle =

The 2023 Ukrainian counteroffensive was a major offensive against Russian forces occupying Ukrainian territory with the goal of breaching the front lines. Efforts were made in many directions, primarily in the Donetsk and Zaporizhzhia oblasts. In total, Ukraine advanced 17 kilometres but suffered heavy casualties in the process. Western officials have said that such losses were not unexpected for attacking forces. The counteroffensive was widely regarded as a crucial moment in the war but also as a failure for Ukrainian forces.

== Ukrainian forces ==
Armed Forces of Ukraine

- Ukrainian Ground Forces
  - 9th Army Corps - Maj. Gen. Eduard Moskalyov
    - 3rd Assault Brigade - Andriy Biletsky
    - 4th Tank Brigade - Oleh Chernov
    - 47th Mechanised Brigade - Lieutenant Colonel Oleksandr Sak (until 16 September); Colonel Oleksandr Pavlii (after 16 September)
    - 58th Motorized Brigade - Oleksandr Saltytskyi
      - 13th Separate Motorized Infantry Battalion - Semenyuk Oleg Mykolayovych †
    - 67th Mechanized Brigade - Andriy Stempitsky (until October 2023); Roman Korenyuk (after October 2023)
  - 10th Army Corps - Brig. Gen. Vasily Zubanich
    - Skala Battalion - Major Yuriy Harkaviy "Skala"
    - 5th Tank Brigade - Col. Andriy Shchukin
    - 33rd Mechanised Brigade - Colonel Ivan Voitenko
    - 116th Mechanised Brigade
    - 117th Mechanised Brigade
    - 118th Mechanised Brigade
  - 11th Army Corps - Maj. Gen. Volodymyr Mirnoyuk
    - 3rd Tank Brigade - Colonel Roman Sheremet
    - 45th Artillery Brigade - Colonel Oleg Faidyuk
    - 60th Mechanised Brigade - Viktor Skaternoi
    - 62nd Mechanised Brigade - Lieutenant Colonel Oleksandr Serhiyevich Moroz
    - 63rd Mechanized Brigade - Colonel Skyba Petro Pavlovych
  - Operational Command North - Brigadier General Dmytro Krasylnykov
    - 5th Assault Brigade - Oleksandr Yakovenko
    - 30th Mechanised Brigade - Colonel Ihor Dovhan
    - 31st Mechanised Brigade
    - 32nd Mechanised Brigade - Denis Merzlikin
    - 44th Mechanised Brigade - Viktor Hryhorovych Fedorenko †
      - 3rd Mechanised Battalion - Major Oleksij Šedul'ko †
    - 110th Mechanised Brigade - Mykola Chumak
  - Operational Command East - Major General Oleh Mikats
    - 23rd Mechanised Brigade
    - 43rd Mechanised Brigade
    - 93rd Mechanised Brigade - Colonel Pavlo Palisa
    - 107th Rocket Artillery Brigade - Colonel Kelembet Oleksandr Mykhailovych (until 12 August), Colonel Savchenko Serhiy Anatoliyovych (after 12 August)
    - 142nd Rifle Brigade - Andrii Dzhuk
  - Operational Command South - Major General Andrii Kovalchuk
    - 21st Mechanised Brigade
    - 22nd Mechanised Brigade Colonel - Zavadsky Dmytro Vadymovich
    - 42nd Mechanised Brigade
    - 56th Motorized Brigade - Col. Serhii Sirchenko
    - 59th Motorised Brigade - Vadym Sukharevsky
      - Chosen Company - Ryan O'Leary
        - 1st Rifle Platoon - Dalton Medlin †
        - 2nd Rifle Platoon - Andrew Webber †
        - 3rd Recon Platoon - Johan Fredriksson †
  - Operational Command West - Major General Serhiy Litvinov
    - 10th Mountain Assault Brigade
    - 44th Artillery Brigade - Roman Dudchenko
    - 65th Mechanised Brigade - A. Kravets
    - 68th Jaeger Brigade - Oleksiy Shum
    - 128th Mountain Assault Brigade - Colonel Dmytro Lysyuk
    - 141st Infantry Brigade - Colonel Serhii Nazvanov
  - Special Police Forces - Ihor Klymenko
    - Khyzhak Brigade
    - Liut Brigade - Colonel Oleksandr Netrebko
  - Norman Brigade - Jean-Francois Ratelle "Hrulf"
  - Black Maple Company
- Ukrainian Marine Corps
  - 35th Marine Brigade - Yuriy Andriyenko
  - 36th Marine Brigade - Lieutenant Colonel Viktor Sikoza
  - 37th Marine Brigade
  - 38th Marine Brigade
  - 140th Marine Reconnaissance Battalion - Oleksandr Mykolayovych Staryna
- Ukrainian Air Assault Forces
  - 46th Airmobile Brigade - Colonel Valeriy Skred
  - 79th Air Assault Brigade - Colonel Oleksandr Lutsenko
    - 1st Separate Air Assault Company "Belarus"
  - 80th Air Assault Brigade - Colonel Ihor Skybyuk
  - 82nd Air Assault Brigade - Lieutenant Colonel Pavlo Rozlach
  - 95th Air Assault Brigade - Dmytro Bratishko
- Ukrainian Air Force
  - 1st Air Force Combined Rifles Brigade - Colonel Bohdan Bondar
- National Guard of Ukraine
  - 11th Public Order Brigade - Colonel Vyacheslav Krasnopolskyi
- Offensive Guard
  - 1st Presidential Operational Brigade - Colonel Mykola Mykolayovych Mishakin (until 28 July); Colonel Anton Olegovich (after 28 July)
  - 3rd Operational Brigade - Lieutenant Colonel Oleksiy Vasyliovych Khilchenko
    - Special Intelligence and Reconnaissance Company - Andriy Ihorovych Syadristy †
  - Rubizh Brigade - Colonel Artem Ilyukhin
  - 14th Chervona Kalyna Brigade - Colonel Oleksandr Okhrimenko
  - 15th Operational Brigade - Colonel Ivan Bondarenko
  - Steel Border Brigade - Colonel Valerii Padytel
- Territorial Defence Forces - Major General Ihor Tantsyura (until 9 October); Lieutenant General Anatoliy Barhylevych (after 9 October)
  - 100th Territorial Defence Brigade - Colonel Ruslan Tkachuk
  - 104th Territorial Defense Brigade - Colonel Oleksandr Tsys (until 4 June); Lieutenant Colonel Serhii Kasprov (after 4 June)
  - 106th Territorial Defense Brigade - Colonel Bihus Valentyn
  - 107th Territorial Defense Brigade - Colonel Andrii Tsisak
  - 108th Territorial Defense Brigade - Colonel Dmytro Herasymenko
    - 98th Territorial Defense Battalion
  - 110th Territorial Defense Brigade - Colonel Oleksandr Ihnatiev
    - 111th Territorial Defense Battalion
    - 114th Territorial Defense Battalion - Major Ivan Ivanovich Yankivskyi
  - 111th Territorial Defense Brigade - Colonel Vadym Bondarenko - Colonel Vadym Bondarenko (until 30 June); Colonel Serhii Mamchenko (after 30 June)
  - 116th Territorial Defense Brigade - Colonel Chakhlov Oleksandr
  - 119th Territorial Defense Brigade - Colonel Vysotskyi Oleksii
    - 167th Territorial Defense Battalion
  - 120th Territorial Defense Brigade - Colonel Yurii Paradiuk
  - 121st Territorial Defense Brigade - Colonel Serhii Zadorozhnyi
  - 128th Territorial Defense Brigade - Colonel Rostyslav Rehinskyi
  - 129th Territorial Defence Brigade
  - Ukrainian Volunteer Army - Dmytro Yarosh
    - 7th Battalion Arei - Oleksandr Hryshchuk
  - International Legion - Colonel Ruslan Miroshnichenko
    - 2nd Battalion International Legion
    - 3rd Battalion International Legion - "Bohdan"
    - Bolívar Battalion - José David Chaparro Martínez
    - Kastuś Kalinoŭski Regiment - Dzianis Prokharaŭ
    - Pahonia Regiment (Note: Disbanded on 1 July 2023)

== Russian forces ==
Russian Armed Forces

- Russian Ground Forces
  - Southern Military District - Colonel General Sergey Kuzovlev
    - 8th Combined Arms Army - Colonel General Gennady V. Anashkin
    - 18th Combined Arms Army - Lieutenant General Andrey Seritsky
      - 40th Army Corps
        - 47th Motor Rifle Division
    - 58th Guards Combined Arms Army - Major General Ivan Ivanovich Popov (until 11 July); Lieutenant General Denis Lyamin (after 11 July)
      - 19th Motor Rifle Division - Colonel Dmitri Ivanovich Uskov
        - 429th Separate Motorized Rifle Regiment
      - 42nd Guards Motor Rifle Division - Colonel Roman Demurchiyev
        - 70th Guards Motor Rifle Regiment
        - 291st Motor Rifle Regiment
  - Western Military District - Colonel General Yevgeny Nikiforov
    - 3rd Army Corps - Major General V. A. Belyaevsky
      - 72nd Separate Motor Rifle Brigade
    - 20th Guards Combined Arms Army - Major General Sukhrab Akhmedov
      - 144th Guards Motor Rifle Division - Colonel Aleksey Alekseyevich Polyakov
  - Eastern Military District - Colonel General Andrey Kuzmenko
    - 5th Combined Arms Army - Major General Aleksey Podivilov
      - 57th Guards Motorized Rifle Brigade
      - 127th Motor Rifle Division - Major General Kuzmenkov Igor Anatolyevich
      - 305th Artillery Brigade
    - 35th Combined Arms Army - Lieutenant General Aleksandr Semyonovich Sanchik
  - Central Military District - Colonel General Andrey Mordvichev
    - 25th Combined Arms Army - Major General Andrey Seritsky
      - 11th Separate Tank Brigade
      - 67th Motorized Rifle Division
        - 19th Tank Regiment
        - 31st Motorized Rifle Regiment (Bashkortostan)
        - 36th Motorized Rifle Regiment
        - 37th Motorized Rifle Regiment
      - 75th Artillery Brigade
    - 41st Combined Arms Army - Lieutenant General Sergey Ryzhkov
- Russian Airborne Forces
  - 7th Guards Mountain Air Assault Division - Colonel Aleksandr Kornev
  - 31st Guards Air Assault Brigade - Colonel Andrey "Dunai" Kondrashkin †
  - 45th Guards Spetsnaz Brigade - Colonel Vadim Pankov
  - 76th Guards Air Assault Division - Guards Colonel Denis Shishov
  - 98th Guards Airborne Division - Guards Colonel Viktor Igoryevich Gunaza
  - 106th Guards Airborne Division - Major General Vladimir Vyacheslavovich Selivyorstov
- GRU
  - 22nd Separate Guards Special Purpose Brigade - Lieutenant Colonel Aleksei Nikolayevich Savchenko
- Russian Navy
  - 336th Guards Naval Infantry Brigade - Colonel Igor Kalmykov
- Pavel Sudoplatov Battalion - Yevgeny Balitsky
- Bogdan Khmelnitsky Battalion - Andrii Tyshchenko
- Storm Ossetia - Ayvengo Tekhov †
- Wagner Group - Andrei Troshev
- Storm-Z - Yevgeny Burdinsky
  - Storm Gladiator
- Storm-V
- (Donetsk People's Republic) Donetsk People's Militia
  - 1st Donetsk Army Corps
    - Pyatnashka Brigade - Akhra Avidzba
    - Vostok Brigade - Alexander Khodakovsky
    - Sparta Battalion - Artem Zhoga
- (Luhansk People's Republic) Luhansk People's Militia
  - 2nd Guards Lugansk-Severodonetsk Army Corps
    - 6th Separate Cossack Motorised Rifle Brigade - Vladimir Sergeevich Polupoltinnykh
    - Prizrak Brigade - Artur Bogachenko †
    - 123rd Separate Guards Motor Rifle Brigade - Denis "Tashkent" Ivanov †
