= 150th Reconnaissance Strike Battalion (Ukraine) =

- 150-й Окремий розвідувально-ударний батальйон
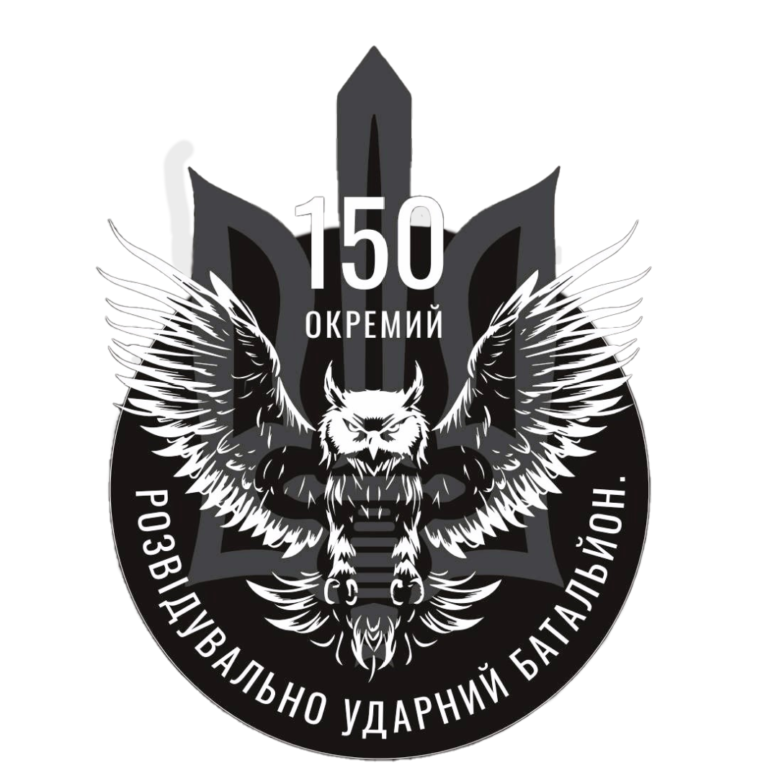
- Battalion's insignia
- Founded: 2023
- Country: Ukraine
- Allegiance: Armed Forces of Ukraine
- Branch: Ukrainian Ground Forces
- Type: Battalion, spetsnaz
- Role: Reconnaissance, counteroffensive and sabotage
- Engagements: Russo-Ukrainian War; 2022 Russian invasion of Ukraine

Commanders
- Current commander: Denys Bryzhatyi

The 150th Separate Reconnaissance Strike Battalion (MUN A4220) is a battalion of the Ukrainian ground forces acting as an independent unit, subordinated to the 9th Army Corps. It has seen combat during the Russo-Ukrainian war, initially as a Company and has been performing reconnaissance, drone strikes and other combat operations throughout the entire front. It was established in 2023.

== History ==
It was established as the 150th Reconnaissance Company in 2023. On 29 June 2023, a soldier of the company (Kuletsky Andri Mykolaovych) was killed in Mala Tokmachka. It absorbed the remnants of the 518th Separate Special Purpose Battalion after its disbandment in Autumn 2023 and became a Battalion.

In January 2024 deputy commander of the battalion Major Andriy Malakhov was sacked for violating protocol. On 24 January 2024, a soldier of the battalion (Hereha Volodymyr Anatoliovych) was killed during the Battle of Avdiivka. On 2 February 2024, a soldier of the battalion (Dobrovolsky Mykhailo Ivanovych) was killed during the Battle of Avdiivka. On 4 February 2024, a soldier of the battalion (Beril Artem Stepanovych) was killed during the Battle of Avdiivka. On 25 February 2024, a soldier of the battalion (Stoushko Volodymyr Anatoliovych) was killed in Pokrovsk. On 15 April 2024, a soldier of the battalion (Starodubets Vitali Ivanovych) was killed in action. On 10 July 2024, a soldier of the battalion (Radytsya Dmytro Dmytrovych) was killed in Donetsk Oblast and another (Solove Ihor Anatoliovych) in Yelizavetovka. On 16 August 2024, a soldier of the battalion (Radomsky Yuri Serhiovych) was killed during the Pokrovsk offensive. On 26 October 2024, a soldier of the battalion (Bilodid Serhi Ivanovych) was killed during the Pokrovsk offensive. On 30 October 2024, a soldier of the battalion (Novokhatko Ivan Hryhorovych) was killed during the Pokrovsk offensive.

On 21 January 2025, a soldier of the battalion (Kozhemaka Roman Volodymyrovych) was killed during the Pokrovsk offensive. On 23 May 2025, a soldier of the battalion (Pansky Oleksandr Vasylovych) was killed in Novooleksandrivka. On 15 June 2025, it destroyed a Russian 9K33 Osa and a 9K35 Strela-10 air defense system using Ukrspecsystems Shark UAVs. In August 2025, it received new vehicles. On 13 October 2023, it held an exhibition in Kyiv.

== Commanders ==
- Denys Bryzhatyi

== Equipment ==
The battalion operates a variety of drones including:

- Ukrspecsystems Shark
- Vector
- Airplast
