= 142nd Mechanized Brigade =

142nd Infantry Brigade
- 142 Окрема Піхотна Бригада
- Shoulder sleeve insignia
- Active: February 15, 2023 – present
- Country: Ukraine
- Branch: Ukrainian Ground Forces
- Role: Mechanized Infantry
- Part of: Operational Command East; 9th Army Corps
- Garrison/HQ: Krasnohrad, Kharkiv Oblast
- Engagements: Russo-Ukrainian War; Russian invasion of Ukraine; 2023 Ukrainian counteroffensive; Pokrovsk offensive
- Website: http://www.facebook.com/142orsb

Commanders
- Current commander: Andrii Dzhuk

The 142nd Infantry Brigade (Ukrainian: 142 Окрема Піхотна Бригада) is a unit of the Ground Forces of Ukraine formed in 2023, originally as a Reserve Rifle Brigade. On 25 July 2023, it was reformed into an infantry brigade.

== History ==
The brigade was formed in spring of 2023. The brigade was involved in the 2023 Ukrainian counteroffensive. Members of the brigade published footage showing how the soldiers of the brigade work with artillery, destroying positions, personnel and equipment of the Russian and separatist armies.

== Structure ==
As of 29 August 2023 the brigade's structure is as follows:

- 142nd Infantry Brigade
  - Brigade Headquarters & Headquarters Company
  - 413th Infantry Battalion
  - 414th Infantry Battalion
  - 415th Infantry Battalion
  - 416th Infantry Battalion
  - 425th Infantry Battalion
  - 426th Infantry Battalion
  - 142nd Field Artillery Regiment
