= Yelizavetovka =

Yelizavetovka may refer to:

- Yelizavetovka, Vorobyovsky District, Voronezh Oblast, a village in the Vorobyovsky District in the Voronezh Oblast, Russia
- Yelizavetovka, Pavlovsky District, Voronezh Oblast, a village in the Pavlovsky District in the Voronezh Oblast, Russia
- Yelizavetovka, Kursk Oblast, a village in the Kursk Oblast, Russia
