= 153rd Mechanized Brigade =

Ukrainian Ground Forces unit

- 153 окрема механізована бригада 153 okrema mekhanizovana bryhada
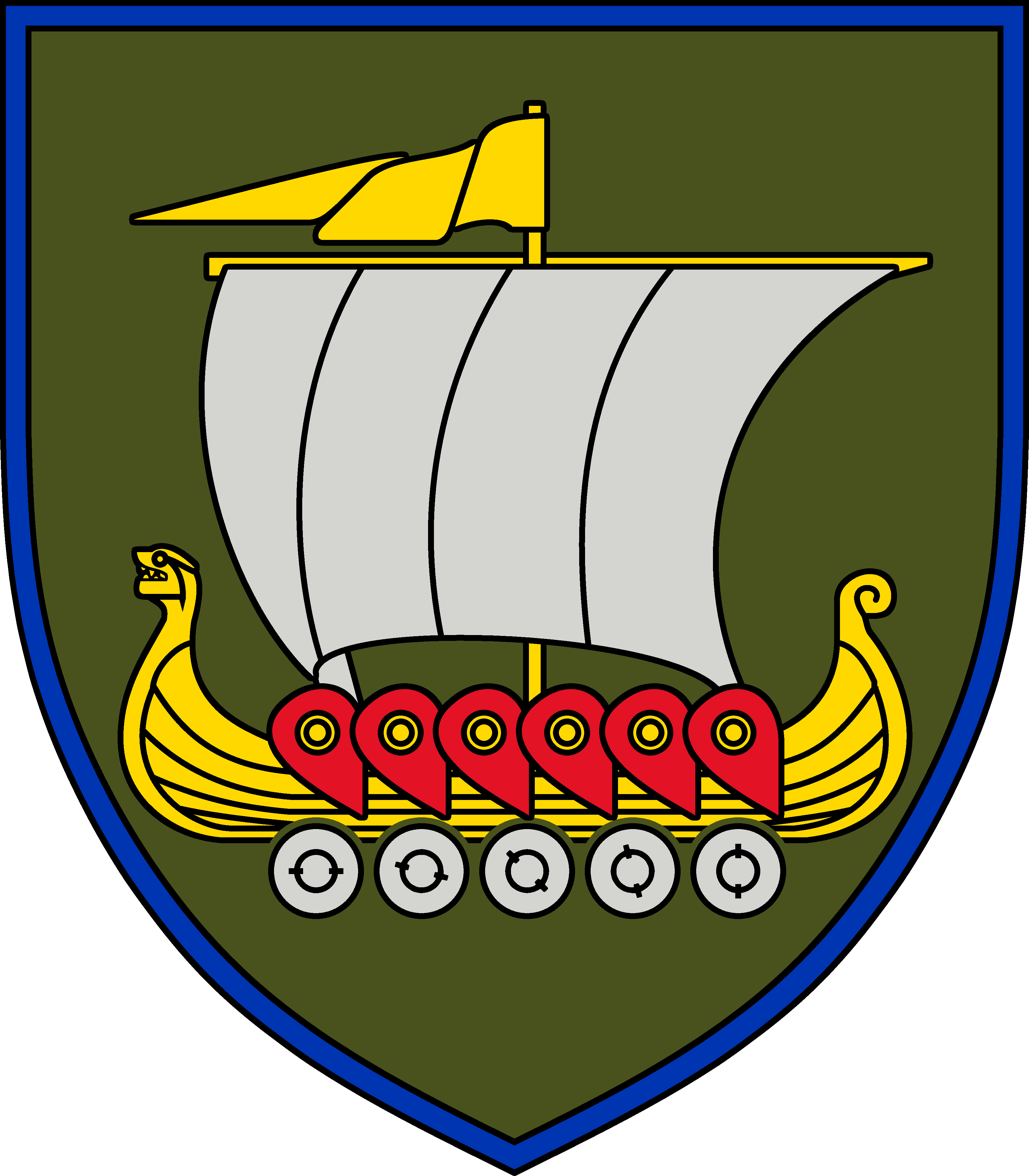
- Shoulder sleeve insignia
- Active: August 29, 2023 – present
- Country: Ukraine
- Branch: Ukrainian Ground Forces
- Type: Mechanized Infantry
- Size: Brigade
- Part of: Operational Command North; 9th Army Corps
- Motto: "The Power of the Unconquered"
- Engagements: Russo-Ukrainian war; Russian invasion of Ukraine; Eastern Ukraine campaign; 2024 Kharkiv offensive; 2024 Kursk incursion
- Website: Official Facebook page

Commanders
- Current commander: Andriy Sotnichenko

The 153rd Mechanized Brigade (Ukrainian: 153 окрема механізована бригада, romanized: 153 okrema mekhanizovana bryhada), is a formation of the Ukrainian Ground Forces formed in 2023. Five additional mechanized brigades were created in preparation of the Ukrainian counteroffensive in 2024 in response to the 2022 Russian Invasion of Ukraine. The insignia, motto, and creation of the brigade were officially publicized and revealed in December 2023.

Due to a lack of vehicles the brigade was reformed as an infantry brigade in April 2024. On 13 May 2024 the unit returned to the designation as a mechanized brigade, revealing a new unit insignia.

== History ==
=== Formation ===
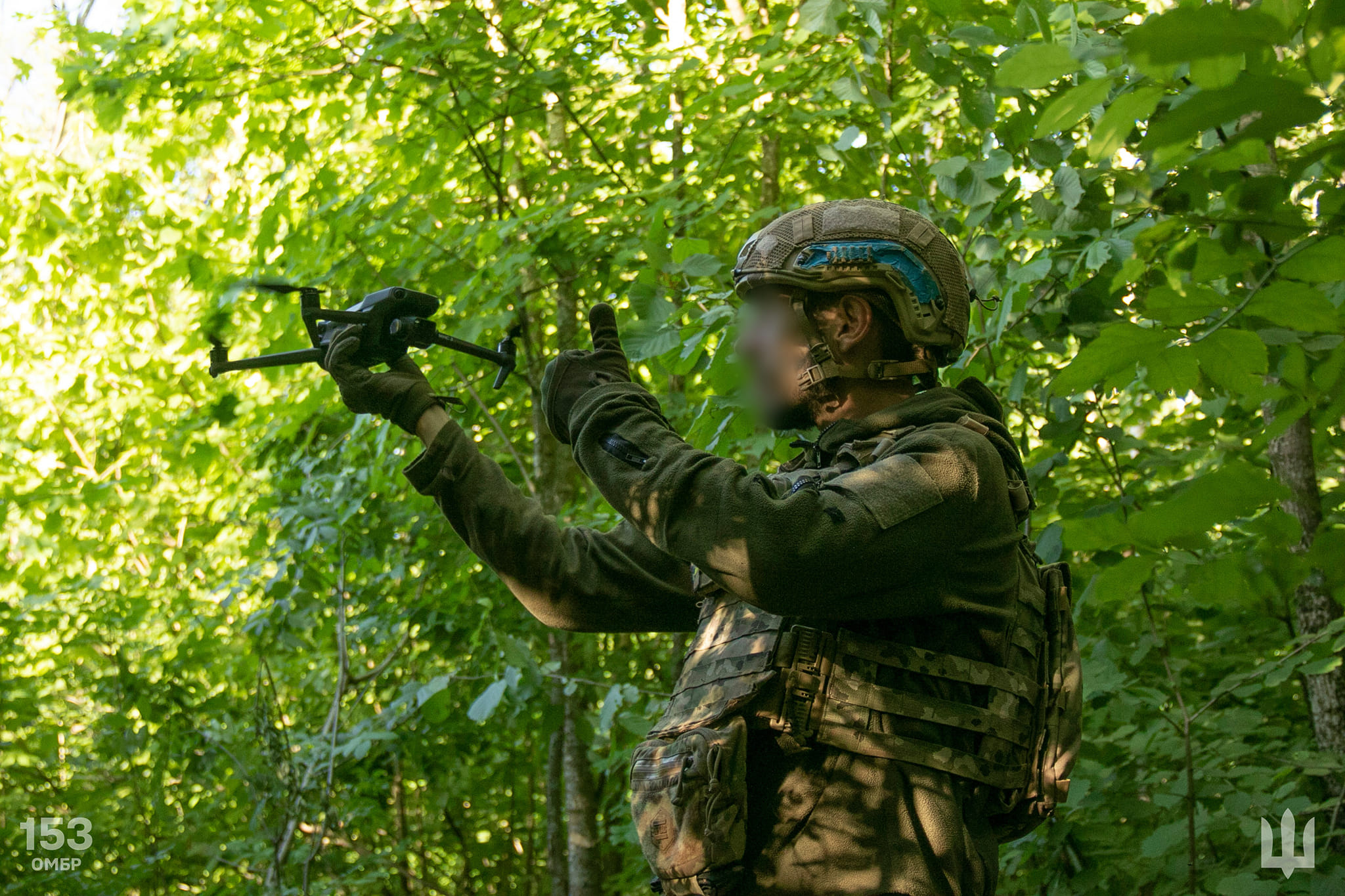
A Drone operator from the brigade deployed during the Kharkiv offensive, July 2024.

The brigade was announced in mid-October 2023, alongside the creation of five new mechanized brigades as part of the Ukrainian Ground Forces, accounting for a five percent expansion of the Ground Forces.

It was reported that the brigade's strength will be filled with 2,000 new recruits. The brigade's purpose was expected to help participate in a Ukrainian counteroffensive in 2024, or possibly against a Russian offensive. According to Forbes, it is unclear where the brigade will receive its equipment that makes them a mechanized brigade; rather than a glorified infantry or motorized brigade. It was noted that the new brigades may not receive new, modern vehicles, but rather old Soviet-era vehicles.

The core of the brigade was reported to me made up of a machine gun platoon, commanded by Nazariy Kishak, belonging to the infamous 72nd Mechanized Brigade. Kishak was known to have been an experienced soldier, participating in the Ukrainian anti-terrorist operation in 2014, commonly referred to as the War in Donbas. The machine gun platoon was created at the beginning of the full-scale Russian invasion of Ukraine, consisting of approximately 200 fighters. Among Kishak's detachment was Oksana Rubaniak, a popular, young female blogger who has been defending Ukraine since the beginning of the full-scale invasion; becoming one of the main faces of the newly established brigade.

=== Reforms ===
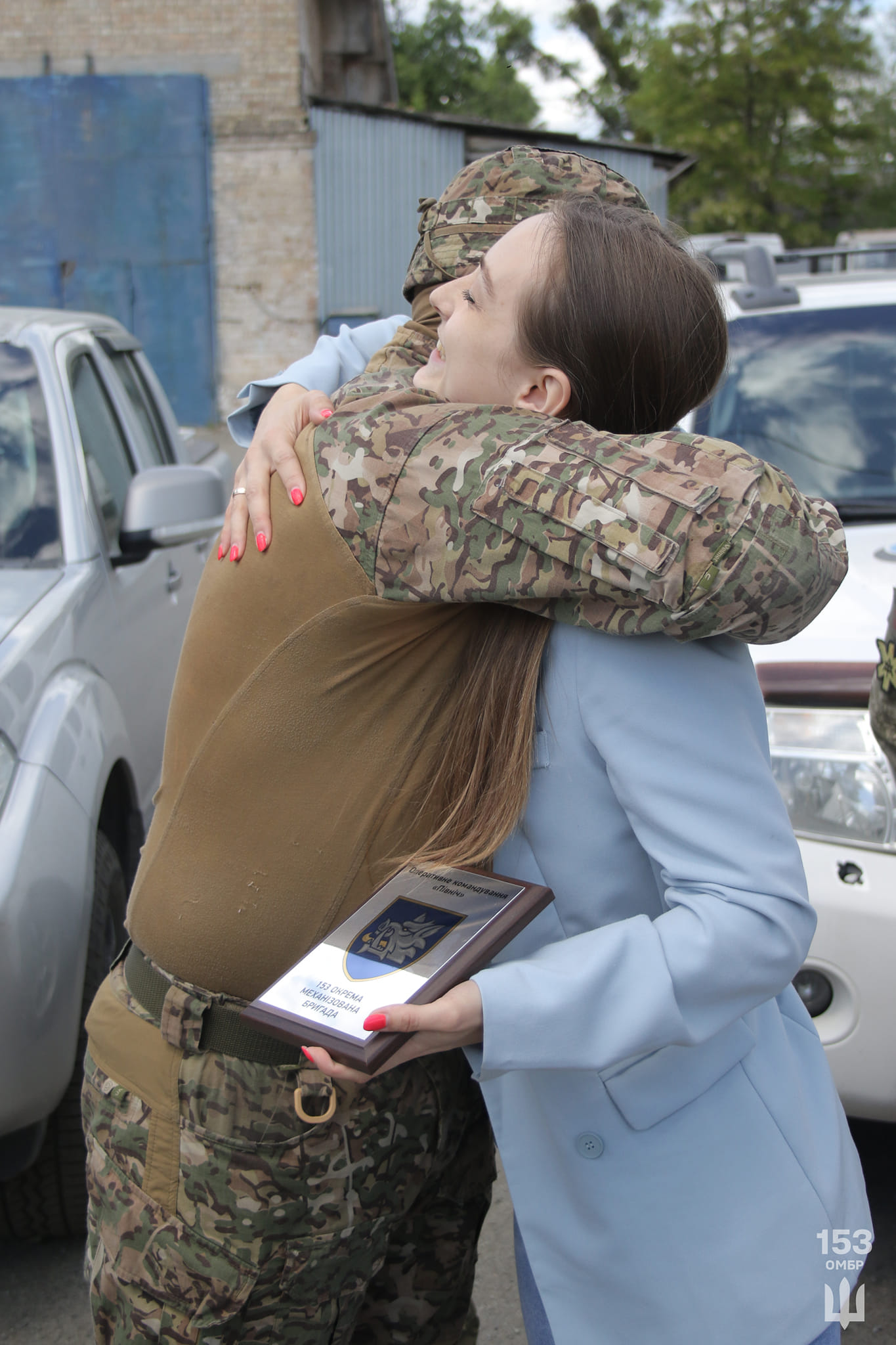
The brigade receiving vehicles as a donation, the brigade emblem is visible.

The 153rd Mechanized Brigade (Ukrainian: 153 окрема механізована бригада, romanized: 153 okrema mekhanizovana bryhada) became an infantry brigade on 2 April 2024 due to a shortage of vehicles for the newly created brigades, leading to the Ukrainian command to rethink plans. After this, the unit became officially known, until 13 May 2024, as the 153rd Infantry Brigade (Ukrainian: 153 окрема піхотна бригада, romanized: 153 okrema pihotna bryhada).

The designation of the unit as an infantry brigade was lifted on 13 May 2024, when publications by the unit were made revealing that it had returned to the designation as a mechanized brigade. Alongside this, the unit also received a new insignia on 16 May 2024, additionally confirming the designation of the unit as a mechanised brigade.

=== Insignia ===
In December 2023 the brigade revealed its insignia, alongside other core elements of the brigade such as the official publicization of its creation and its motto. The insignia featured a shield with a yellow border, with the interior being blue, reflecting the colours of the Ukrainian flag. In the centre of the insignia was a cross shape, with a variation of the Ukrainian Tryzub symbol towards the top of the insignia. This version of the insignia was retained during the period of the brigade being reformed as an infantry brigade.

After being reformed for a second time, and redesignated as a mechanized brigade, the brigade was seen to have a new insignia on 16 May 2024. The new insignia retained several features such as the colours of the shield, but instead changed the central elements of the insignia. The center of the insignia now featured the head of a boar's head profile in shades of grey.

As the earlier insignia were unofficial, the brigade began the process of obtaining official approval for a new one. The new insignia features a medieval Rus boat mounted on wheels, a design proposed by Captain Andriy Koval, a historian from Kyiv who is currently serving in the 153rd Brigade. The new insignia is inspired by an episode in The Tale of Bygone Years by Nestor, in which Prince Oleg ordered his warriors to haul their boats ashore during his 907 campaign against Constantinople, fit them with wheels and roll them overland to the city walls, thus turning river craft into land vehicles and catching the defenders off guard. Captain Koval explained that the new insignia symbolised the brigade's preparedness for bold and unconventional actions, even if they appeared risky or unpredictable.

==== Visual insignia ====
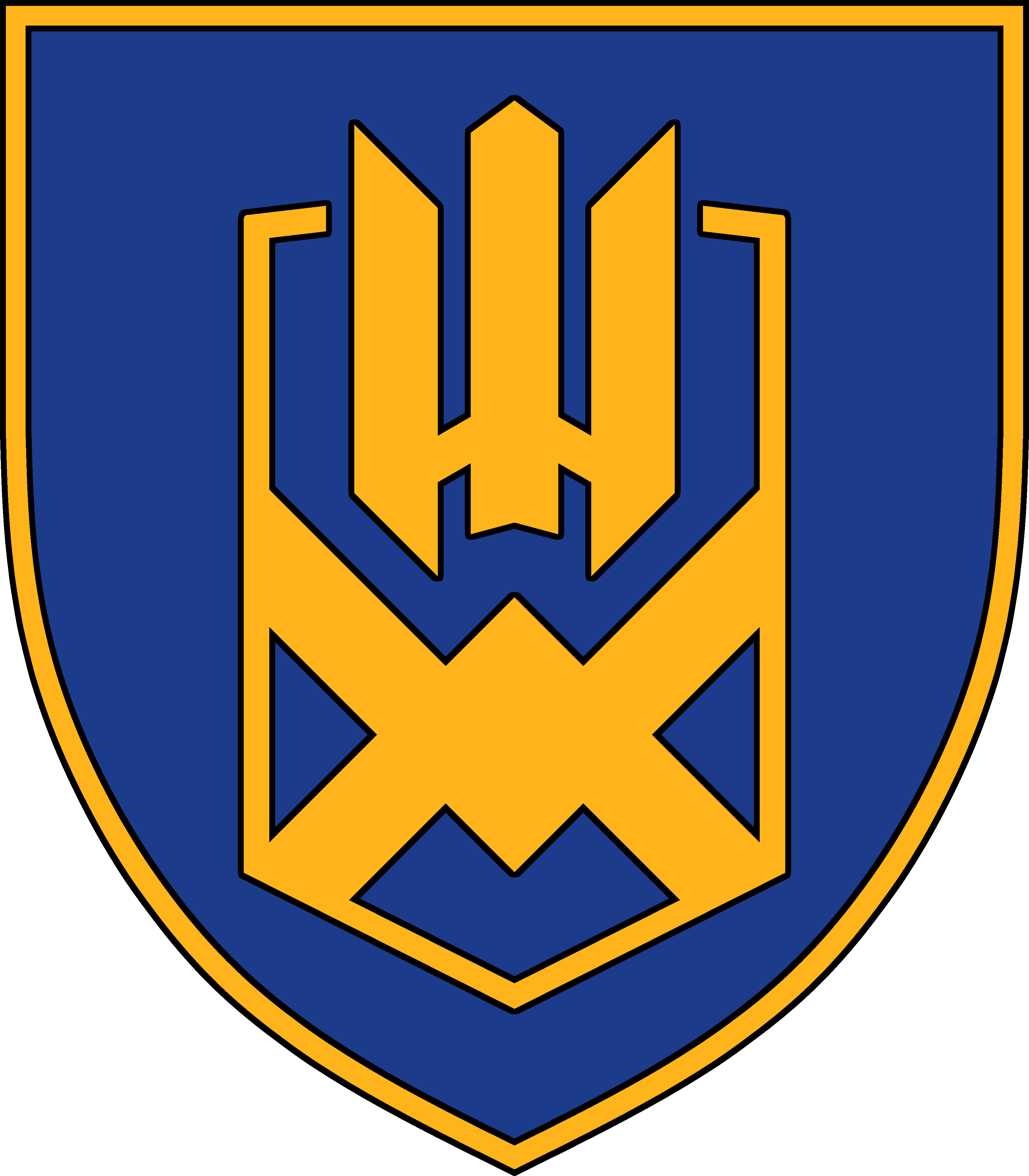
First shoulder sleeve insignia of the 153rd Mechanized Brigade.

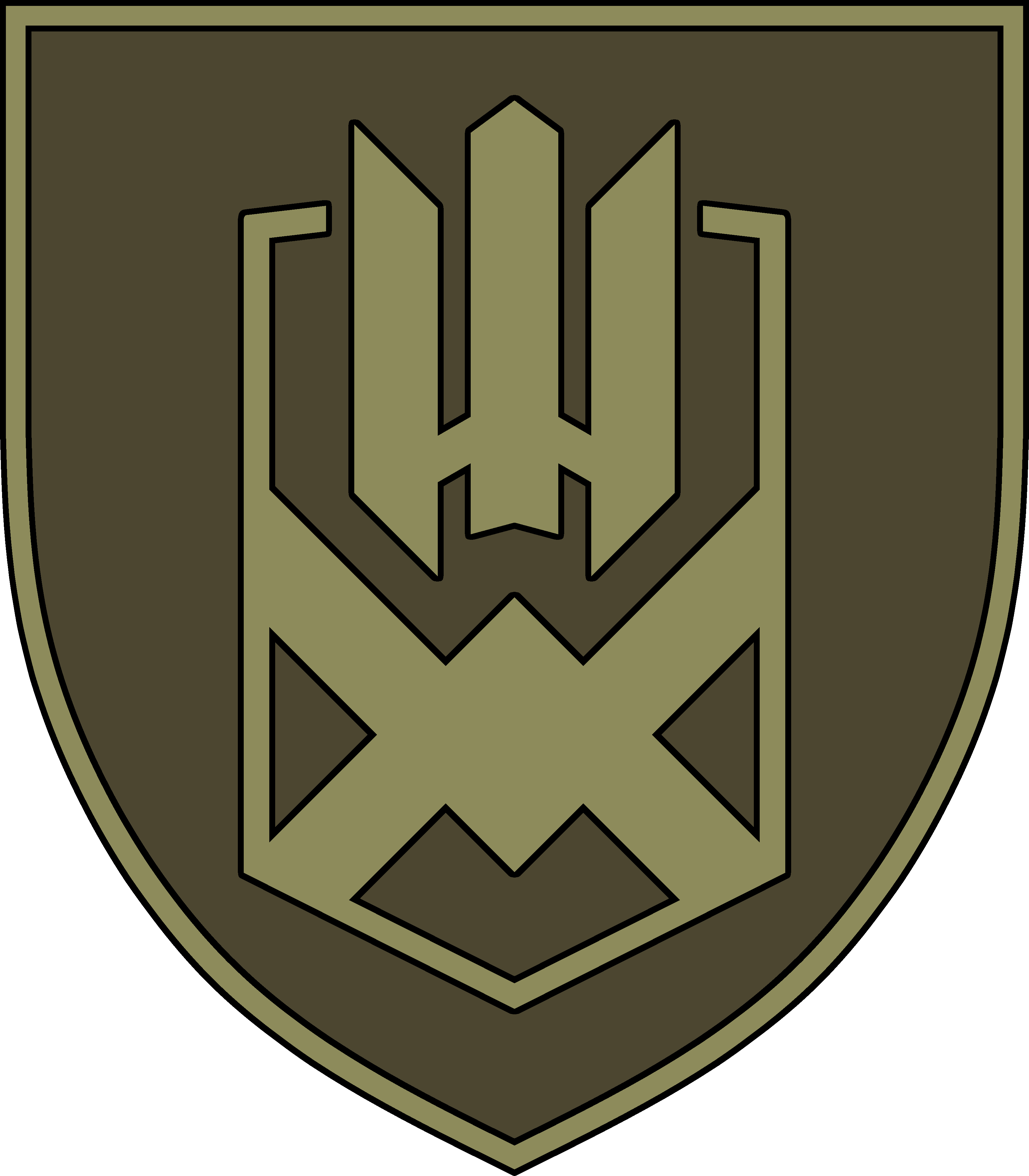
First shoulder sleeve insignia, subdued variant, of the 153rd Mechanized Brigade.

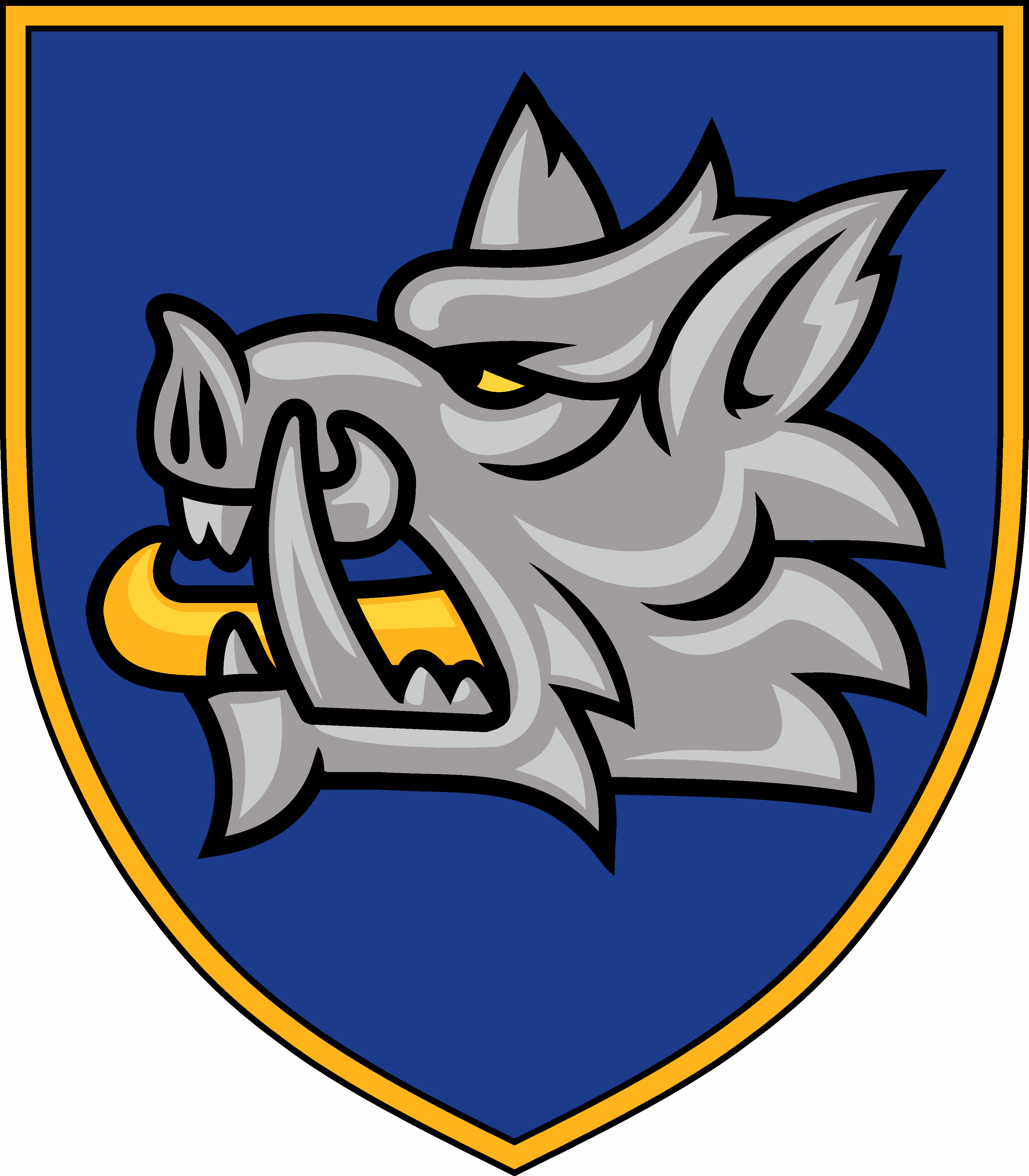
Second shoulder sleeve insignia of the 153rd Mechanized Brigade.

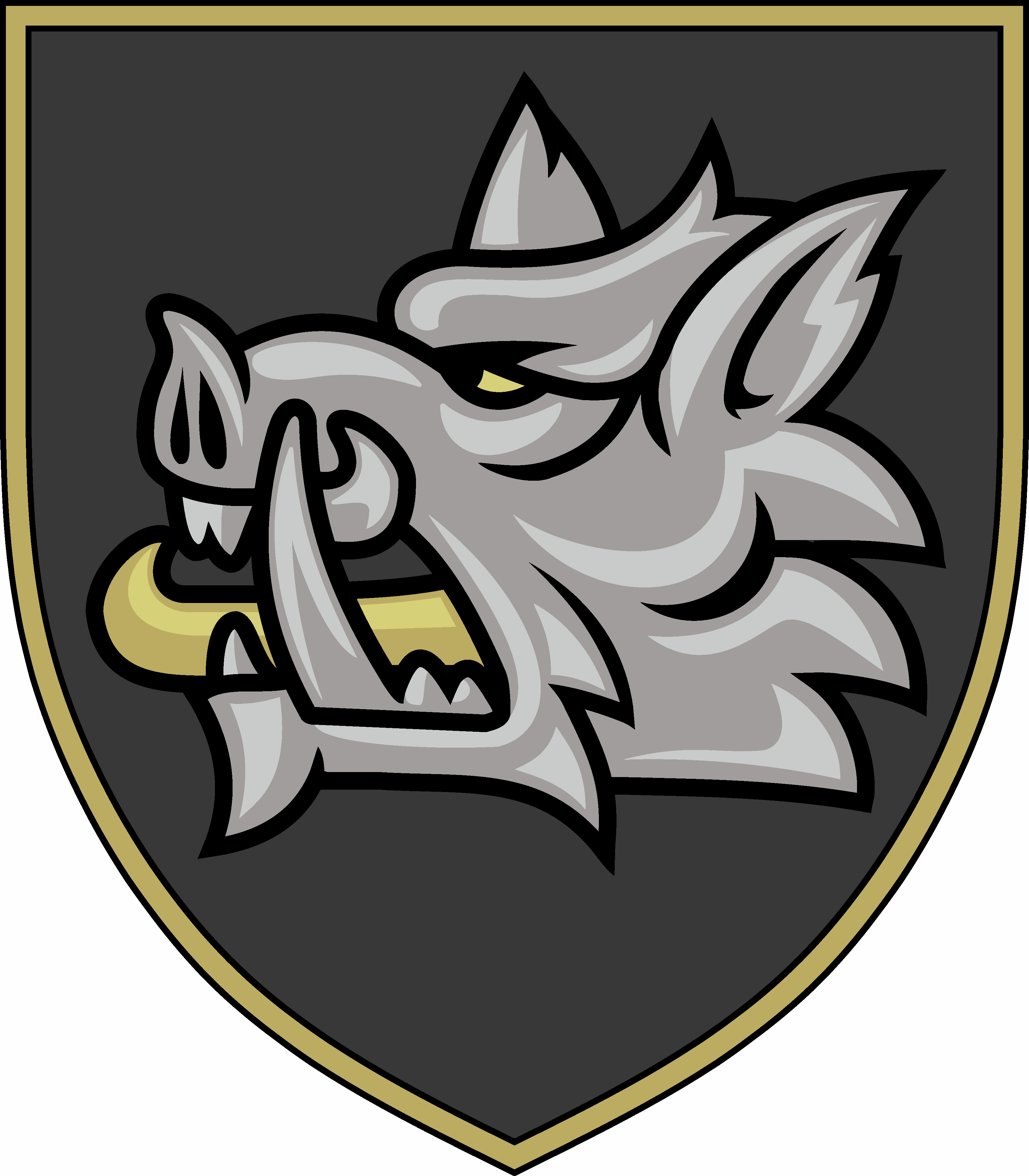
Second shoulder sleeve insignia, subdued variant, of the 153rd Mechanized Brigade.

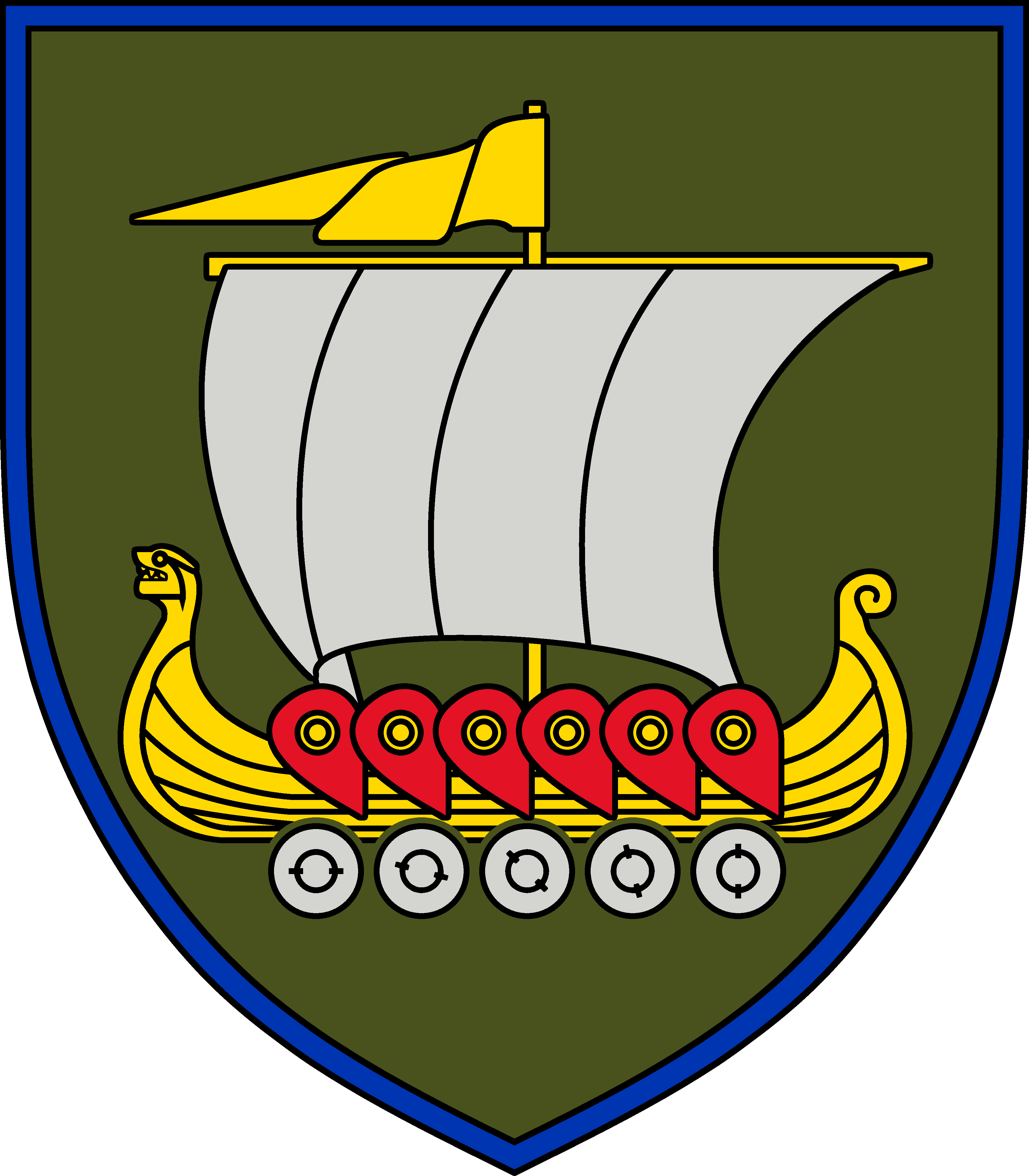
Current shoulder sleeve insignia of the 153rd Mechanized Brigade.

== Equipment ==
=== Small arms ===
Much like of the other brigades that was created alongside it, the brigade predominantly uses older models of the Kalashnikov rifle series—namely, the AKM.

As of August 2024, the brigade utilizes the following small arms:

- AKM – Soviet/Russian assault rifle

== Russo-Ukrainian War ==
=== Russian invasion of Ukraine ===
The brigade was reported to be formed in anticipation of a potential Ukrainian counteroffensive in 2024, as well as to bolster Ukrainian defenses in eastern Ukraine to relieve depleted units deployed there.

==== Kharkiv offensive, 2024 ====
On 27 May 2024 it was published by the brigade that it had engaged in combat actions in the Kharkiv direction of the frontline, with a platoon of soldiers from the brigade partaking in the 2024 Kharkiv offensive. There was visual confirmation of a vehicle loss that was carried out by the brigade.

==== Kursk offensive, 2024 ====
On 6 August 2024, the Ukrainian Armed Forces launched an incursion into Kursk Oblast, Russia, clashing with Russian forces. On 29 August 2024, marking a year of the brigade's existence, the brigade announced that they had participated in offensive operations in both Kharkiv and Kursk Oblast's, confirming that the brigade had participated in the offensive. The extent of the brigade's involvement is unclear.

== Structure ==
As of December 2023, the structure of the brigade is as follows:

- 153rd Mechanized Brigade
  - Brigade's Headquarters
  - 1st Mechanized Battalion
  - 2nd Mechanized Battalion
  - 3rd Mechanized Battalion
  - Tank Battalion
  - Reconnaissance Company
  - Artillery Group
  - Anti-Aircraft Defense Battalion
  - Engineer Battalion
  - Logistic Battalion
  - Signal Company
  - Maintenance Battalion
  - Radar Company
  - Medical Company
  - Chemical, biological, radiological and nuclear defence Protection Company
