= 18th Public Order Battalion (Ukraine) =

18th Public Order Protection Battalion
- 18-й окремий батальйон НГ (Ukrainian)
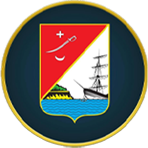
- Battalion Insignia
- Founded: 1996
- Country: Ukraine
- Allegiance: Ministry of Internal Affairs
- Branch: National Guard of Ukraine
- Type: Battalion
- Role: Law enforcement and protection of Ukrainian territorial integrity
- Part of: 11th Public Order Protection Brigade
- Garrison/HQ: Izmail
- Engagements: Russo-Ukrainian war: Revolution of Dignity; Russian invasion of Crimea; War in Donbas; Russian invasion of Ukraine; Siege of Mariupol

Commanders
- Current commander: Major Rufanov Yevgeny Oleksandrovich
- Notable commanders: Colonel Andriy Kovtun (surrendered)

The 18th Public Order Protection Battalion is battalion of the 11th Public Order Protection Brigade of the National Guard of Ukraine tasked with law enforcement and maintenance of public order. It was established in 1996 in Yalta but temporarily ceased to exist following the defection of the majority of its personnel to Russia including its commander in 2014 but was reestablished in 2017. It is currently headquartered in Izmail.

== History ==
The battalion was established in Yalta on 5 October 1996 as a part of the Internal Troops of Ukraine with Major Volodymyr Kondratiev as its first commander. It was tasked to protect public order on the streets of the cities of Yalta, Alupka, and Gaspra and also to participate in various operations to ensure the safety of high-ranking state officials, participants in international meetings and conferences, sports events, leisure facilities and socio-political events in Yalta and other cities of Crimea. It successfully apprehended hundreds of criminals and thousands of administrative offenses were averted by the battalion's actions in law enforcement. In addition, the Battalion also carried out search and rescue operations during disasters. From December 2013 to February 2014, the entire battalion was deployed to maintain public order during the Revolution of Dignity in Kyiv and then returned to Crimea following the end of deployment.

Following the Annexation of Crimea by the Russian Federation, a large number of the battalion's personnel including the battalion's commander Oleg Karptsov defected to Russia.

On 8 April 2014, the defectors of the battalion established themselves as a battalion of the Internal Troops of Russia with Lieutenant Colonel Andriy Kovtun as their commander and took oath to Russia in May 2014. From 2 to 10 April 2015, the defected battalion took part in the Russian exercise "Zaslin-2015".

In Ukraine, the battalion was however reestablished on the basis of the 4th battalion of the 11th Public Order Brigade in August 2018.

Following the Russian invasion of Ukraine, the Battalion saw combat against Russian forces during the Siege of Mariupol. During the Siege of Mariupol, a soldier of the brigade (Kunytskyi Timur Mykolayovych) was killed on 26 March 2022. On 9 May 2022, another soldier of the battalion (Pantelii Ivanovich Boshkov) was killed during the Siege of Azovstal.

== Structure ==
The structure of the battalion is as follows:

- Battalion Headquarters
- 1st Patrol Company
- 2nd Patrol Company
- Logistics Platoon

== Commanders ==
- Major Volodymyr Kondratiev (1996-?)
- Colonel Andriy Kovtun (surrendered) (?-2014) (Note: Currently the commander of the defected part of the battalion)
- Lieutenant Colonel Andriy Ivanovich Boyko (2018–2023)
- Major Rufanov Yevgeny Oleksandrovich (2023-)

== Sources ==
- "Батальон Нацгвардии в Измаиле год спустя, после основания: личный состав увеличился, подразделение стало отдельной воинской частью". gorod24.info. Gorod 24. 2018-10-12. Archived from the original on 2019-08-26.
- "Территорию батальона Нацгвардии в Измаиле сегодня "оккупировали"…школьники". bessarabiainform.com. Bessarabia Inform. 2019-03-22. Archived from the original on 15 January 2021.
- В Ізмаїлі гвардійці влаштували день відкритих дверей
