= Novooleksandrivka =

Novooleksandrivka may refer to the following places in Ukraine:

- Novooleksandrivka, Hrodivka settlement hromada, a village in Pokrovsk Raion, Donetsk Oblast
- Novooleksandrivka, Kramatorsk Raion, Donetsk Oblast, a village in Donetsk Oblast
- Novooleksandrivka, Beryslav Raion, Kherson Oblast, a village in Kherson Oblast
- Novooleksandrivka, Alchevsk Raion, Luhansk Oblast, a village in Luhansk Oblast
- Novooleksandrivka, Luhansk Raion, Luhansk Oblast, a village in Luhansk Oblast
- Novooleksandrivka (Znamianka urban hromada), a village in Kirovohrad Oblast

== See also ==
- Nova Oleksandrivka
- Novooleksandrivka rural hromada
