= 5th Assault Brigade =

Ukrainian Ground Forces unit

5th Separate Assault Brigade
- 5-та окрема штурмова бригада 5-ta okrema shturmova bryhada
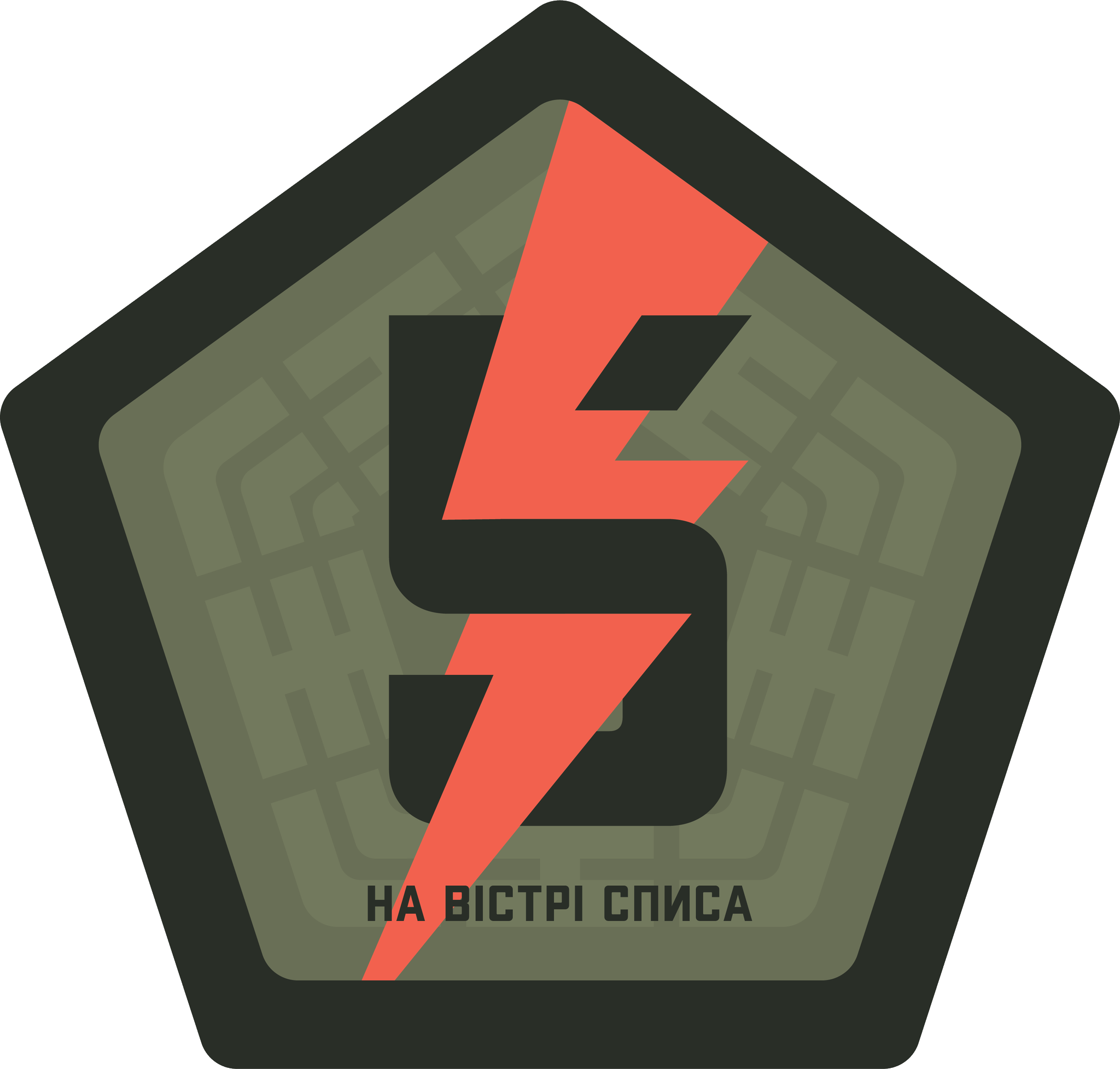
- Brigade insignia
- Active: 10 May 2022 – present
- Country: Ukraine
- Branch: Ukrainian Ground Forces
- Role: Assault Infantry
- Part of: Operational Command North
- Engagements: Russo-Ukrainian War; Russian invasion of Ukraine; Eastern Ukraine campaign; Battle of Bakhmut; 2023 Ukrainian counteroffensive; Battle of Chasiv Yar
- Website: Official Telegram channel

Commanders
- Current commander: Col. Oleksandr Yakovenko

Insignia
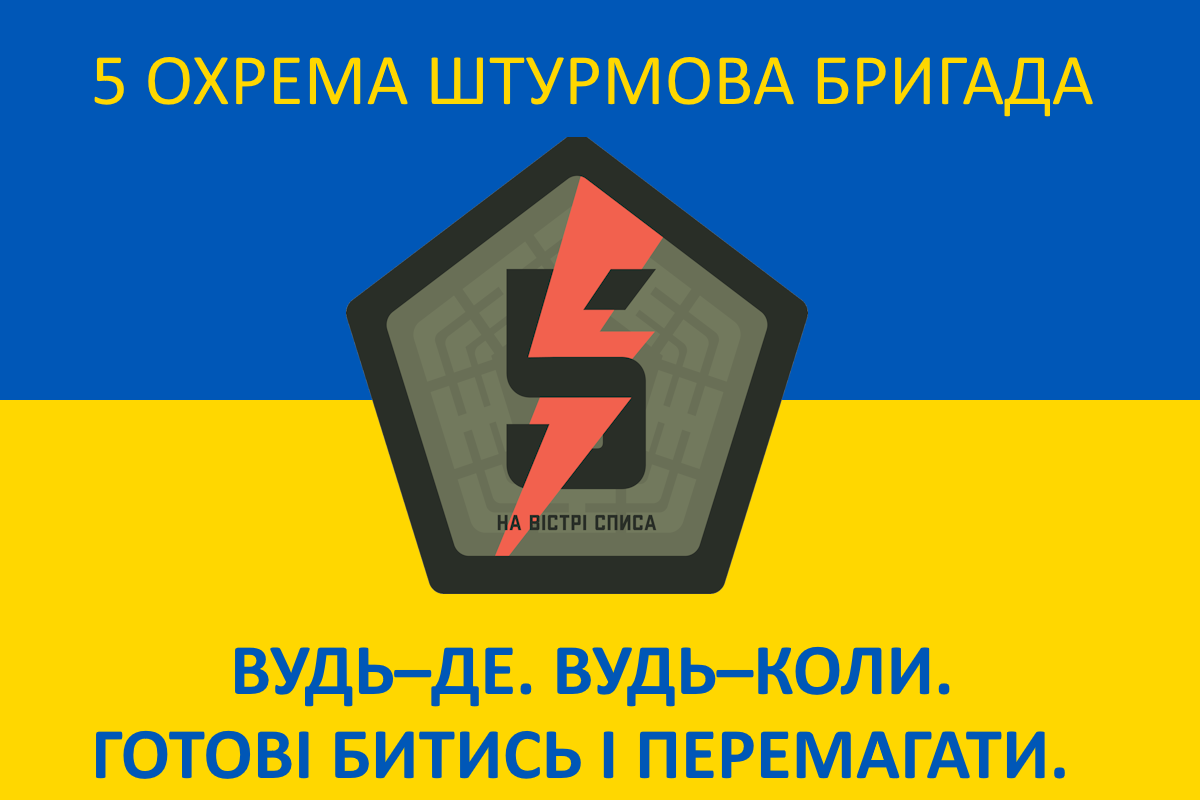
- Flag

The 5th Separate Assault Brigade "Kyiv" (Ukrainian: 5-та окрема штурмова бригада, romanized: 5-ta okrema shturmova bryhada) is a brigade of the Ukrainian Ground Forces formed in 2022 as a response to the Russian invasion of Ukraine.

== History ==
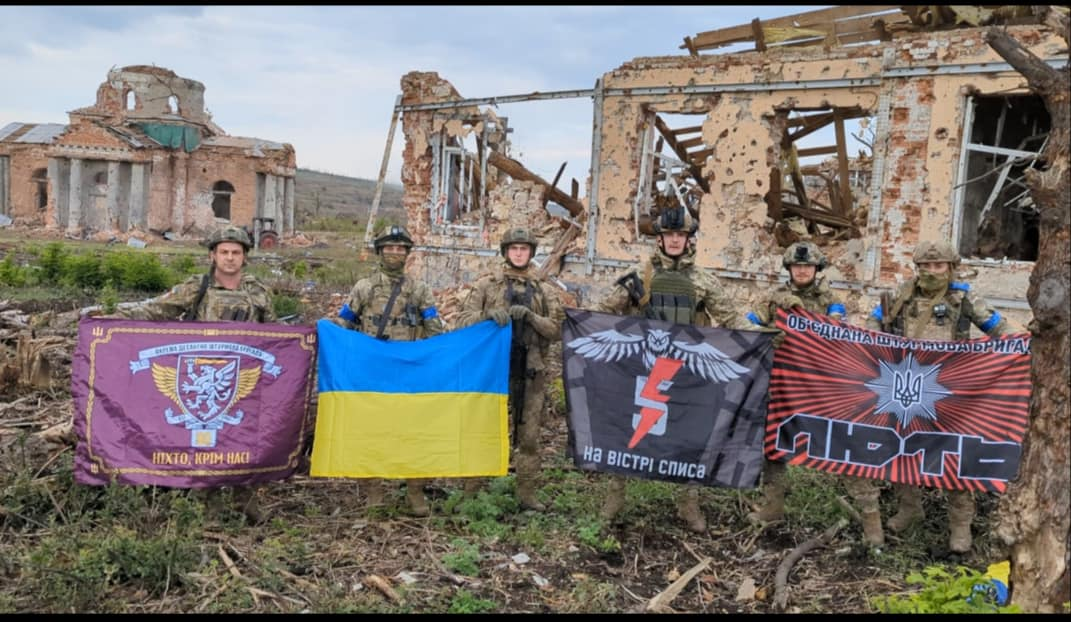
Members of the 5th Brigade together with soldiers from other units after re-caputing the village of Klishchiivka during the Battle of Bakhmut

The 5th Assault Regiment's first commander was Pavlo Palisa. Under the command of Colonel Palisa, the 5th Assault Regiment is part of the Operational Command North. As of February 2023, the regiment was fighting in the battle of Bakhmut.

On 24 February 2023, the regiment was reformed into a brigade and the 24th Assault Battalion Aidar was assigned under its command. On the same day, the brigade received its battle flag from President Volodymyr Zelenskyy. On 29 September 2023, the 5th Assault Brigade was awarded the honorary title "Kyiv" by decree of President Zelenskyy.

In April 2024, the brigade was stationed near the city of Chasiv Yar in Donetsk Oblast.

== Structure ==
As of 2024 the brigade's structure is as follows:

- 5th Separate Assault Brigade
  - Headquarters & Headquarters Company
  - 1st Mechanized Infantry Battalion
  - 2nd Mechanized Infantry Battalion
  - 1st Assault Infantry Battalion
  - 3rd Assault Infantry Battalion
  - 24th Separate Assault Infantry Battalion “Aidar”
    - Battalion HHC
    - 1st Assault company
    - 2nd Assault company
    - 3rd Assault company
    - Fire Support company
    - Tank company
    - Artillery battery
    - 1st Mortar battery
    - 2nd Mortar battery
  - 5th Tank Battalion
  - Field Artillery Regiment
    - Headquarters and Target Acquisition Battery
    - Recon and Observer Battalion
    - 1st Self-propelled Artillery Battalion
    - 2nd Self-propelled Artillery Battalion
    - Rocket Launcher Artillery Battalion
    - Anti-Tank Artillery Battalion
  - 5th Anti-Aircraft Missile Defense Artillery Regiment
  - Reconnaissance Battalion
    - Attack UAV Systems Company "Phoenix"
  - Combat Engineer Battalion
  - Logistics Battalion
  - Maintenance Battalion
  - Signal Company
  - Radar Company
  - Medical Company
  - Chemical, Biological, Radiological and Nuclear Defense Company
  - Military Police Platoon
  - Brigade Band
