= Yelizavetovka, Vorobyovsky District, Voronezh Oblast =

Yelizavetovka Елизаветовка
- Selo
- Location within Voronezh Oblast Location within Russia
- Coordinates: 50°45′N 40°53′E
- Country: Russia
- Region: Voronezh Oblast
- District: Vorobyovsky District
- Time zone: UTC+3:00

Yelizavetovka (Russian: Елизаветовка) is a rural locality (a selo) in Beryozovskoye Rural Settlement, Vorobyovsky District, Voronezh Oblast, Russia. The population was 379 in 2010. There are five streets.

== Geography ==
Yelizavetovka is located 18 km north of Vorobyovka (the district's administrative centre) by road. Beryozovka is the nearest rural locality.
