= Oleksandr Yakovenko (lieutenant colonel) =

Ukrainian military officer

- Native name: Олександр Олексійович Яковенко
- Born: Oleksandr Oleksiyovych Yakovenko; June 29, 1968 (age 57); Volnovakha, Ukrainian SSR, USSR
- Allegiance: Ukraine
- Branch: Ukrainian Ground Forces
- Conflicts: Russo-Ukrainian War; War in Donbas; Russian invasion of Ukraine
- Awards: Hero of Ukraine

Oleksandr Yakovenko (Ukrainian: Олександр Олексійович Яковенко; born 29 June 1968, Volnovakha, Donetsk Oblast, Ukraine) is a lieutenant colonel of the Armed Forces of Ukraine, participant in the Russo-Ukrainian war. He is a Hero of Ukraine with the award of the Order of the Golden Star.

== Biography ==
As of 2018, he was the commander of the 24th separate assault battalion "Aidar".

In 2023, he was appointed commander of the 5th Separate Assault Brigade.

== Awards ==
- the title of Hero of Ukraine with the award of the Order of the Golden Star (2022) — for personal courage and heroism shown in the defense of the state sovereignty and territorial integrity of Ukraine, loyalty to the military oath.
- Order of Bohdan Khmelnytsky 3d class (March 8, 2022) — for personal courage and selfless actions in the defense of state sovereignty and territorial integrity of Ukraine, loyalty to the military oath.
