= 11th Public Order Brigade =

11th Public Order Brigade (2019-) 49th Public Order Protection Regiment (2014-2019) 33rd Separate Battalion (2003-2014) 12th Separate Regiment (1998-2003) 22nd Separate Special Motorized Brigade (1995—1998)
- 11-та бригада НГ (Ukrainian)
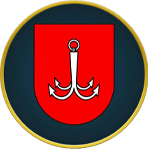
- Brigade Insignia
- Founded: 1992
- Country: Ukraine
- Branch: National Guard of Ukraine (1991–1995); Internal Troops of Ukraine (1995–2014); National Guard of Ukraine
- Type: Brigade
- Role: Law enforcement, protection of the Ukrainian territorial integrity
- Garrison/HQ: Odessa
- Nickname: Odessa Brigade
- Patron: Mykhailo Hrushevsky
- Engagements: Transnistrian conflict: Transnistrian War; Yugoslav Wars: United Nations Protection Force; Russo-Ukrainian war: War in Donbas; Russian invasion of Ukraine

Insignia
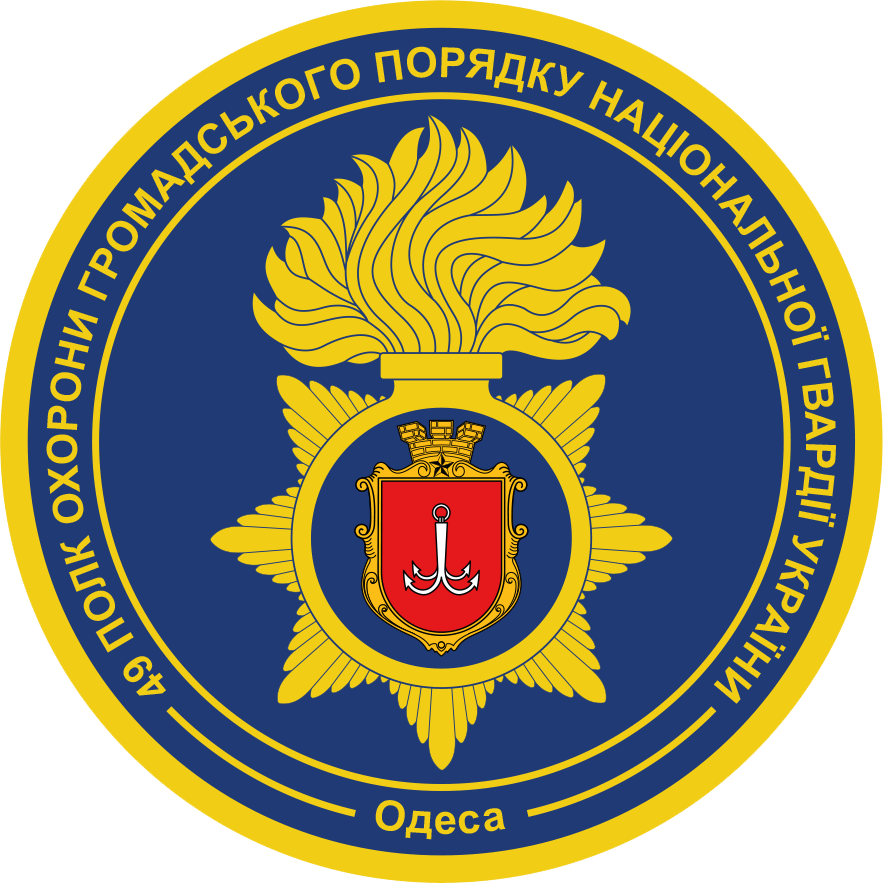
- Former Insignia

11th Separate Public Order Odesa Brigade "Mykhailo Hrushevsky" is a brigade of the National Guard of Ukraine tasked with protection of public law and order, and after the Russian invasion of Ukraine, the territorial integrity of Ukraine. It was established in 1992 as the 7th Separate National Guard Regiment on the basis of the 42nd Special Motorized Militia Regiment. It is headquartered in Odesa city.

== History ==
On 2 January 1992, following the Dissolution of the Soviet Union, the 7th regiment of the National Guard of Ukraine was established on the basis of the 42nd Special Motorized Militia Regiment.

From 1992 to 1995, servicemen of the regiment defended the border with Moldova during the Transnistrian conflict, seeing some combat during the Transnistrian war, albeit without direct orders from the Ukrainian government. During the same timespan, the regiment's units performed peacekeeping operations during the Yugoslav wars as a part of the United Nations Protection Force.

On 26 January 1995, the Regiment was subordinated to the Internal Troops of Ukraine and was reorganized into the 22nd Separate Special Motorized Brigade, then into the 12th separate regiment in 1999 and the 33rd Separate Battalion in 2003.

From November 2013 to February 2014, during the Euromaidan and the Revolution of Dignity, the entire regiment performed service and combat tasks in the Kyiv. In 2014, the unit became part of the newly created National Guard of Ukraine as the 49th Public Order Regiment. During 2014–2015, about 400 personnel of the regiment performed combat tasks in the "M" sector of the ATO zone. The regiment saw combat during the 2014 Battle of Mariupol during which on 2 November 2014, a civilian SUV that exploded rigged with explosives, accompanied by a drone of Russian Spetsnaz forces blew up when approaching a roadblock set up by the regiment's personnel, a soldier of the regiment (Mykola Anatoliyovych Rusnak) was immediately killed in the explosion. Lieutenant Colonel Trickster Gennadiy Vasyliovych of the regiment was also seriously wounded and died soon after in the Mariupol hospital.

On 24 August 2015, the regiment was presented with a Combat Flag and the honorary award "For Courage and Bravery" for its actions in the War in Donbass.

On 30 March 2019, a soldier of the regiment (Florya Vitaly Valentynovych) was wounded in a car crash while on duty in Odesa Oblast, then a local who was previously a convicted criminal attacked him and beat him to death, he then attempted to steal his weaponry but was captured by authorities. In October 2019, the regiment became the 11th Separate Public Order Brigade and Colonel Vyacheslav Krasnopolsky was appointed as its commander.

On 23 August 2021, the brigade was awarded the honorary name of "Mykhailo Hrushevsky", who was the president of the Central Rada of the Ukrainian People's Republic and a highly influential figure in Ukrainian history, the ribbon of the honorary name was presented on the island of Khortytsia on 14 October 2021.

The brigade has seen combat during the Russian invasion of Ukraine. It took part in the 2023 Ukrainian Counteroffensive with a soldier of the brigade (Evgeny Mykolayovych Bonchev) being killed in the village of Mala Tokmachka on 29 August 2023 during a combat operation of the counteroffensive.

== Commanders ==
- Colonel Vitaliy Danko (2016–2018)
- Colonel Andrii Stepanovych Savchuk (2018–2019)
- Colonel Vyacheslav Krasnopolskyi (2019-)

== Structure ==
- 11th Public Order Brigade
  - 1st Patrol Battalion
  - 2nd Patrol Battalion
  - 3rd Patrol Battalion
  - 18th Public Order Protection Battalion
  - Automobile Company
  - Military Band

== Sources ==
- Національна гвардія України
- "Плюс 400 штыков: одесский полк Национальной гвардии сформирует еще один батальон". dumskaya.net. Dumskaya. 2017-04-27. Archived from the original on 27 June 2017.
- Гвардійці 49 полку підвели підсумки роботи по завершенню курортного сезону в Затоці
- "В Ізмаїлі пройшли агітаційні заходи". ngu.gov.ua/. National Guard of Ukraine. 2018-01-23. Archived from the original on 25 January 2018.
