= 9th Army Corps (Ukraine) =

Ukrainian Ground Forces formation

- 9-й армійський корпус
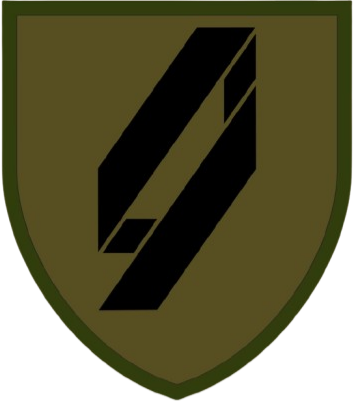
- Active: November 19, 2022 – present
- Country: Ukraine
- Allegiance: Armed Forces of Ukraine
- Branch: Ukrainian Ground Forces
- Type: Corps
- Size: 40,000 - 80,000
- Part of: Operational Command East; Dnipro operational-strategic group
- Garrison/HQ: Lutsk, Volyn Oblast
- Motto: Together to Victory
- Engagements: Russo-Ukrainian War
- Website: Official Facebook page

Commanders
- Current commander: Maj. Gen. Viktor Nikolyuk
- Notable commanders: Brig. Gen. Oleksandr Lutsenko (2024)

Insignia
- Former Inisgnia (2022-2025)

The 9th Army Corps (Ukrainian: 9-й армійський корпус) is a Corps of the Ukrainian Ground Forces.

== History ==
The corps was formed on November 19, 2022, and was first mentioned in the order of Ministry of Defense of Ukraine on November 21, 2022. It was formed as part of a start to help reform the Ukrainian military under combined arms units, which would not take a greater force until early 2025. It was formed in the city of Lutsk in Volyn Oblast, based on the money allocation and visual representation of Lyubart’s Castle in the unit’s emblem. It was reportedly created in preparation for the summer 2023 Ukrainian offensive in southern Ukraine.

The 9th Army Corps launched the first phase of a Ukrainian offensive in June 2023, when, armed with new Western military vehicles, it advanced into a well-fortified Russian defensive line, making little progress.

As of August 2025, the 9th Army Corps was responsible for the defense of the area of Pokrovsk and Myrnohrad.

== Structure ==
=== 2022–24 ===
In the early years, the following units were associated with the 9th Army Corps:

- 9th Army Corps
  - 1st Separate Special Forces Brigade
  - 3rd Assault Brigade
  - 4th Tank Brigade
  - 67th Mechanized Brigade
  - 508th Repair and Restoration Battalion

=== 2025 ===
As of 2025 the corps structure is as follows:

- IX Army Corps
  - Corps Headquarters
    - Management
    - Commandant Platoon
  - 5th Heavy Mechanized Brigade
  - 32nd Mechanized Brigade
  - 55th Artillery Brigade
  - 68th Jaeger Brigade (Former; transferred to 8th Air Assault Corps in February 2026)
  - 81st Signals Battalion
  - 92nd Support Battalion
  - 142nd Mechanized Brigade
  - 150th Reconnaissance Battalion
  - 153rd Mechanized Brigade
  - 228th Logistics Battalion
  - 431st Unmanned Systems Battalion
  - 474th Guard Battalion
  - 508th Maintenance Battalion
