= 32nd Mechanized Brigade =

Ukrainian Ground Forces unit

- 32 окремої механізованої бригади
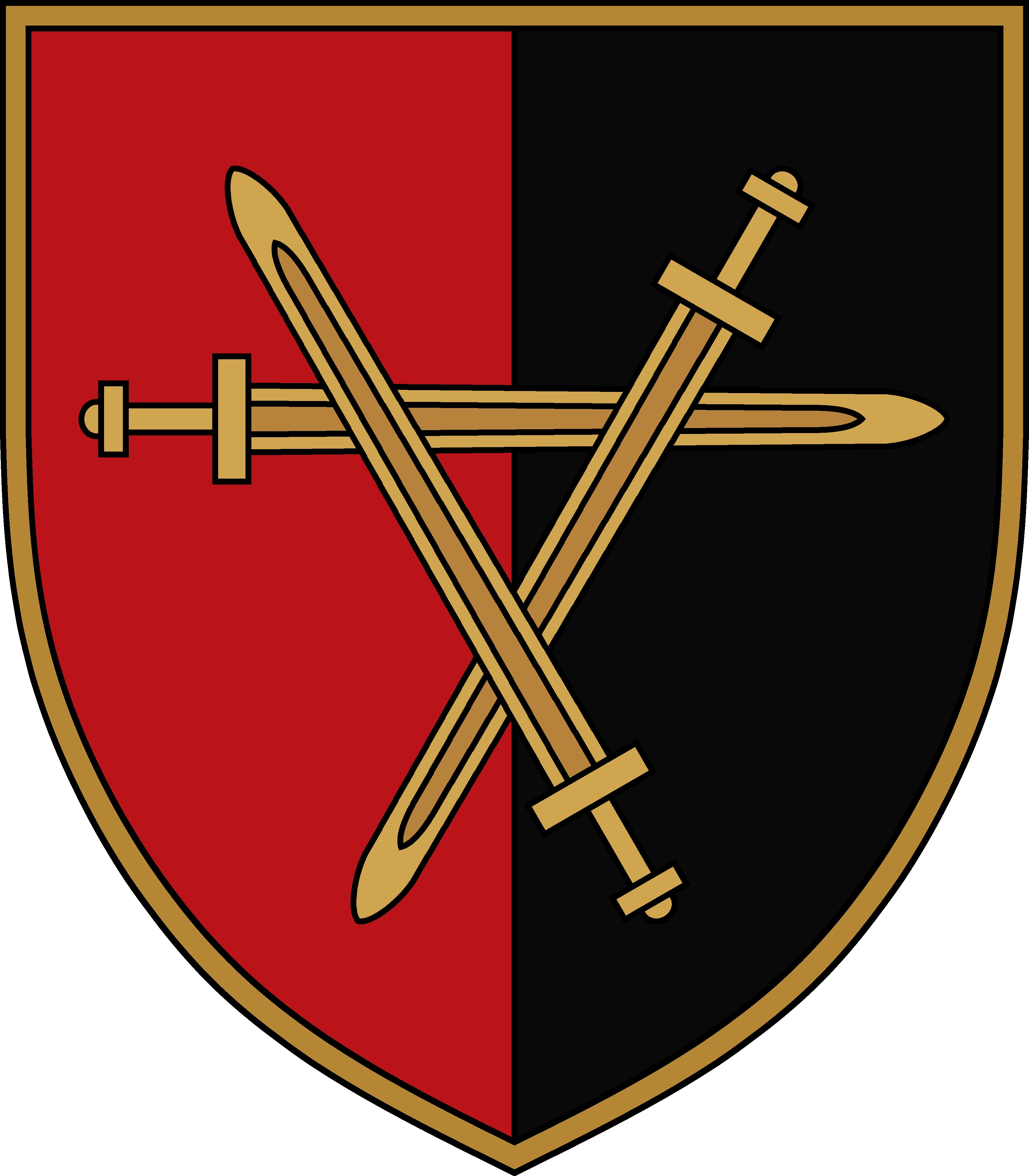
- Sleeve Patch of the 32nd Brigade
- Active: February 9, 2023 - present
- Country: Ukraine
- Branch: Ukrainian Ground Forces
- Role: Mechanized Infantry
- Part of: Operational Command North; 9th Army Corps
- Engagements: Russo-Ukrainian War; 2022 Russian Invasion of Ukraine; 2023 Ukrainian Counteroffensive
- Website: https://www.facebook.com/32OMB

Commanders
- Current commander: Denis Merzlikin

Insignia
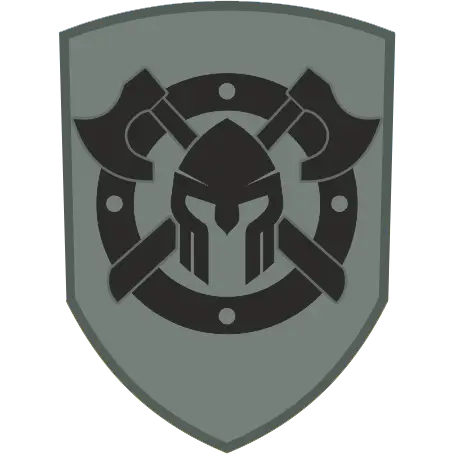
- Old sleeve patch of the 32nd Mechanized Brigade (Pre November 2023)

The 32nd Mechanized Brigade "Steel" (Ukrainian: 32 окремої механізованої бригади) is a brigade of the Ukrainian Ground Forces formed in 2023. Originally the brigade was going to be armed with an unknown number of M2 Bradleys, 10 Czech T-72EA tanks and 90 MaxxPro armored trucks but was later reported to be equipped with older T-64s and M113s.

== History ==
The brigade was at the stage of formation as of February 2023. It has been involved in the 2023 Ukrainian counteroffensive. In August 2023, it was reported that the brigade had been involved in combat in an area southeast of the city of Kupiansk in Kharkiv Oblast.

On 5 May 2025, the brigade was awarded the honorary name "Steel" by decree of President Volodymyr Zelenskyy.

== Personnel ==
According to the Ukrainian TV channel 1+1, as of August 2023, a large number of the brigade's soldiers did not have time to receive proper training after mobilization and were sent to frontline positions and allowed to perform combat missions after only two months of training.

== Structure ==
As of 2024 the brigade's structure is as follows:

- 32nd Mechanized Brigade,
  - Headquarters & Headquarters Company
  - 1st Mechanized Battalion
  - 2nd Mechanized Battalion
  - 3rd Mechanized Battalion
- 405th Rifle Battalion (unit number A4863)
  - Tank Battalion
  - Artillery Group
  - Anti-Aircraft Defense Battalion
  - Reconnaissance Company
  - Engineer Battalion
  - Logistic Battalion
  - Maintenance Battalion
  - Signal Company
  - Radar Company
  - Medical Company
  - Chemical, Biological, Radiological and Nuclear Proteccion Company (CBRN-defense)
