= Pavlo Palisa =

Ukrainian military commander

- Павло Паліса
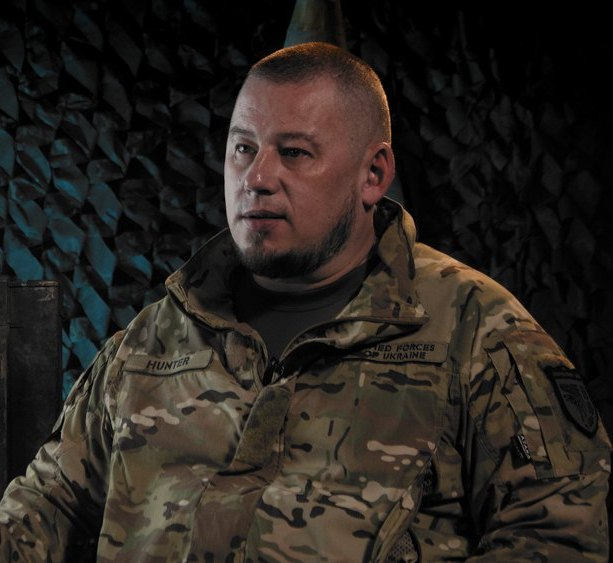
- Palisa in 2025

Deputy Head of the Office of the President
- Incumbent
- Assumed office 29 November 2024
- President: Volodymyr Zelenskyy
- Head: Andriy Yermak; Kyrylo Budanov

Personal details
- Born: 14 February 1985 (age 41) Belarusian SSR, Soviet Union
- Nickname: Hunter (Хантер)

Military service
- Allegiance: Ukraine
- Branch/service: Armed Forces of Ukraine
- Rank: Brigadier general
- Battles/wars: Russo-Ukrainian War; Russian invasion of Ukraine; Battle of Bakhmut
- Awards: Cross of Military Merit; Order of Bohdan Khmelnytsky, 3rd class

Pavlo Serhiiovych Palisa (Ukrainian: Павло Сергійович Паліса; born 14 February 1985) is a Ukrainian soldier and public servant, brigadier general of the Armed Forces of Ukraine, and a combatant in the Russian-Ukrainian war. Since 2024, he has served as Deputy Head of the Office of the President of Ukraine.

== Biography ==
In 2007, Palisa graduated from the Lviv Institute of Land Forces of the Lviv Polytechnic National University (now the Hetman Petro Sahaidachnyi National Ground Forces Academy), and in 2019, he graduated from the Command and Staff Institute of the National Defense University of Ukraine.

Following the full-scale Russian invasion, he interrupted his studies at the United States Army Command and General Staff College to join the defense of Ukraine. In June 2022, the American educational institution issued a diploma to Pavlo, who was then commanding the 5th Assault Regiment, to loud applause.

In 2023, he became the commander of the 93rd mechanized brigade "Kholodnyi Yar". He fought in the battles for Bakhmut.

In 2024, Palisa became Deputy Head of the Office of the President of Ukraine. On 24 February 2026, President Volodymyr Zelenskyy promoted Palisa to brigadier general.

== Awards ==
- Cross of Military Merit (28 November 2023)
- Order of Bohdan Khmelnytsky, 3rd class (13 January 2023)
