= 44th Mechanized Brigade =

Ukrainian Ground Forces unit

- 44 окрема механізована бригада 44 okrema mekhanizovana bryhada
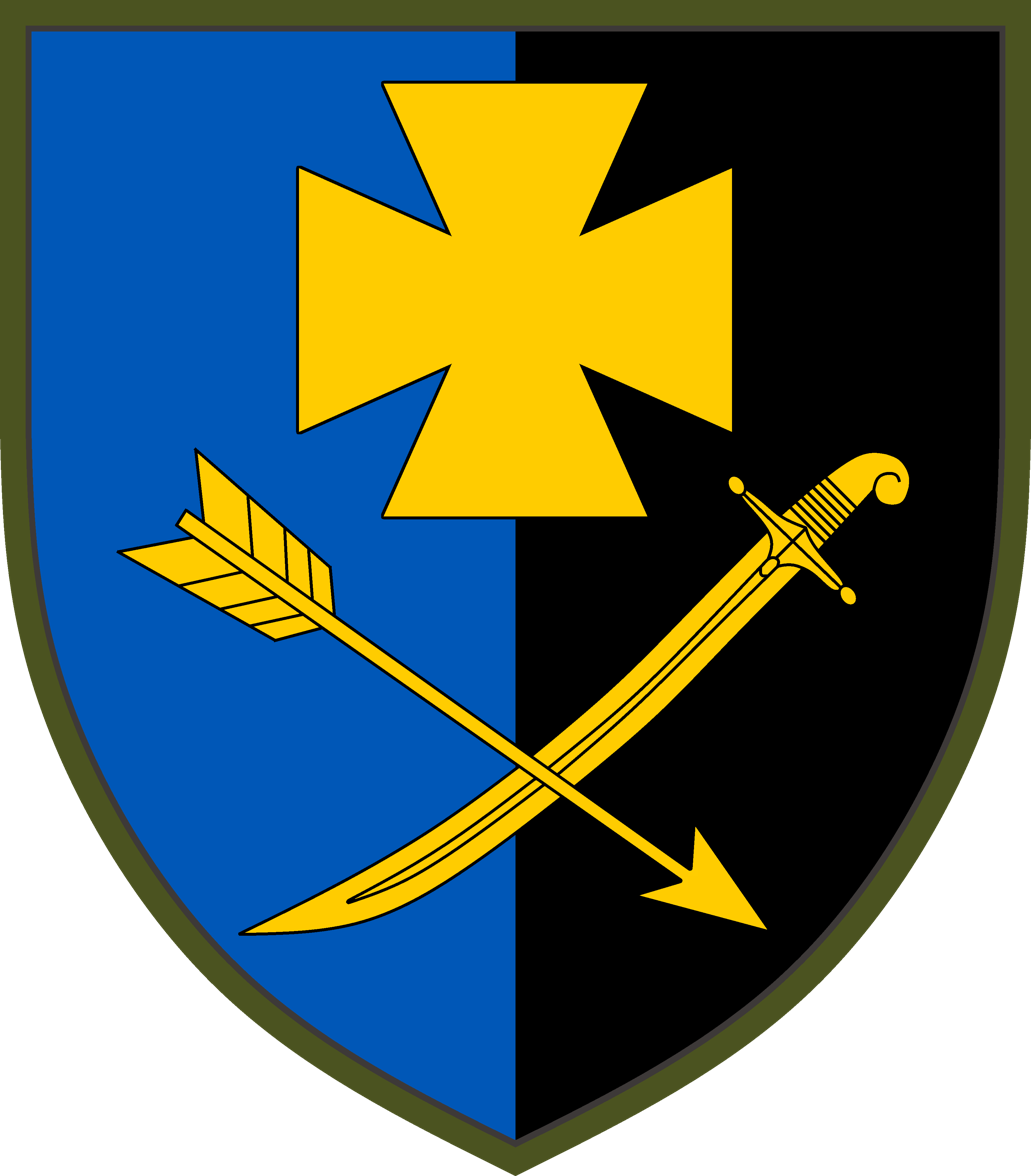
- Shoulder Sleeve Insignia
- Active: 2 March 2023 - present
- Country: Ukraine
- Branch: Ukrainian Ground Forces
- Type: Mechanized Infantry
- Size: Brigade
- Motto: "Si vis pacem – para bellum"
- Engagements: Russo-Ukrainian War; 2023 Ukrainian counteroffensive
- Website: Official Facebook page

Commanders
- Current commander: Unknown
- Notable commanders: Viktor Fedorenko † (2023)

The 44th Mechanized Brigade (44 OMBR) is a mechanized formation of the Ukrainian Ground Forces. It was formed in 2023 during the Russian invasion of Ukraine, with personnel training in Ukraine and Poland. The brigade operates a mixture of Soviet-designed and Western-supplied equipment, including BMP-1 infantry fighting vehicles, Polish Rosomak armored personnel carriers and Rak self-propelled mortars, Slovenian Valuk armored personnel carriers, and Leopard 1A5 tanks. It was the first Ukrainian formation publicly identified as operating the Leopard 1A5.

A battalion of the brigade was deployed west of Kreminna in 2023, and the brigade subsequently operated on the Svatove axis in 2024. Reporting during 2025 and 2026 placed elements of the brigade on the Toretsk and Kostiantynivka axes in Donetsk Oblast, where they participated in defensive operations against Russian forces.

== History ==
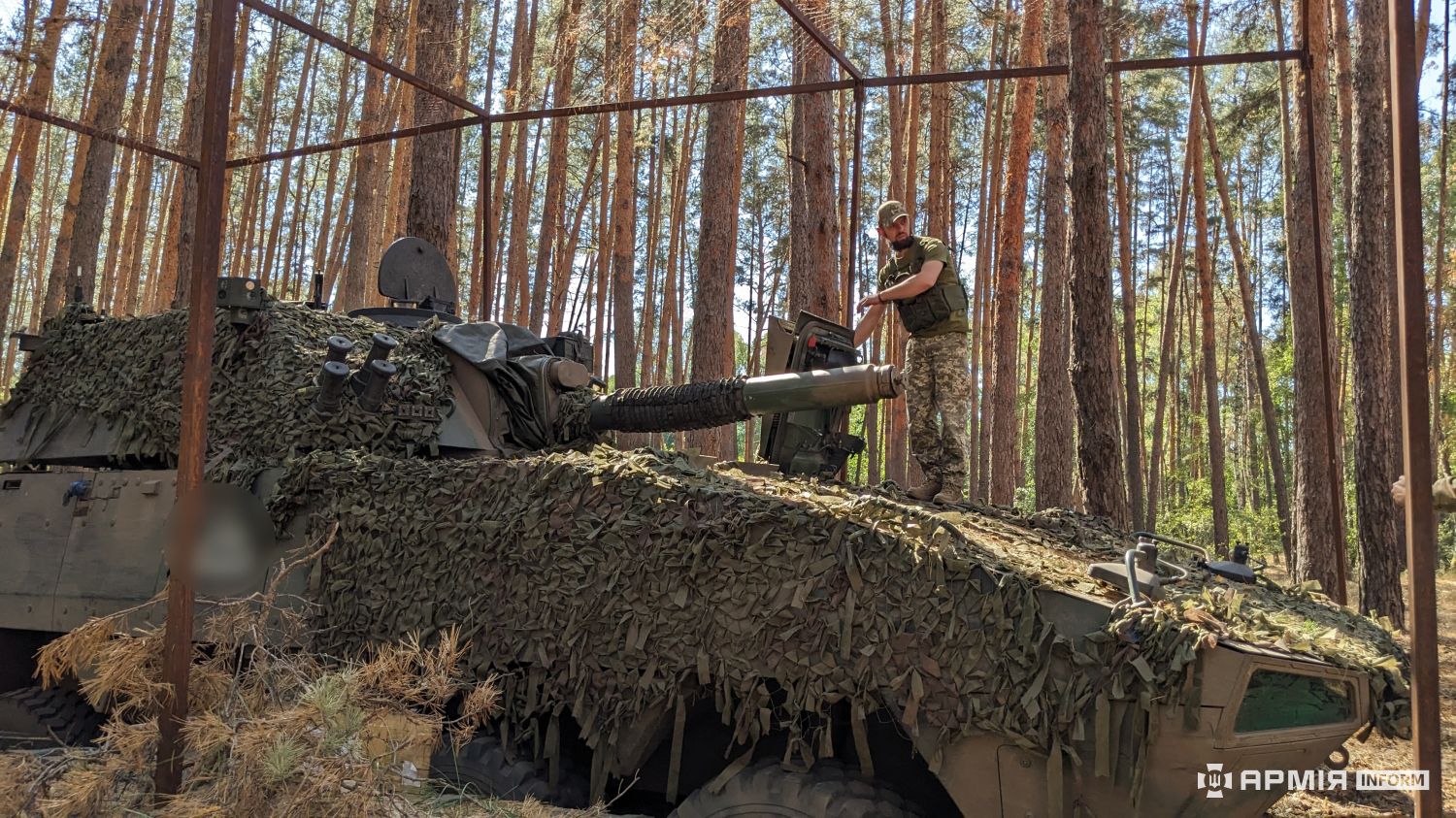
Rak self-propelled mortar of the 44th Mechanized Brigade

The brigade was established on 2 March 2023 as part of the expansion of the Ukrainian Ground Forces following the Russian invasion of Ukraine. Its personnel initially trained in Ukraine before some of its battalions were sent to Poland, where they trained with Western-supplied vehicles and weapons. In November 2023, Leopard 1A5 tanks belonging to the brigade were photographed near the front in Kharkiv Oblast. Members of their crews stated that the tanks had already participated in combat, marking the first publicly confirmed operational use of the Leopard 1A5 by a Ukrainian formation. The brigade had also begun operating Polish Rak 120 mm self-propelled mortars by December. In September 2023, it was transferred north, together with the 42nd Mechanized Brigade to reinforce Ukrainian defenses in the Kupiansk region.

In 2024, the brigade fought on the front in Luhansk.During 2024, the brigade continued operating in northeastern Ukraine. In July, its anti-aircraft units were reported on the Svatove axis, where they protected the brigade's positions and artillery from Russian reconnaissance and attack drones.

By May 2025, elements of the brigade were operating in several sectors of Donetsk Oblast. ArmyInform reported that a brigade armored group equipped with Rosomak vehicles had operated on the Pokrovsk axis, while the brigade's unmanned-systems battalion was engaged on the Toretsk axis.

In April 2026, the commander of the brigade's anti-aircraft missile battalion stated that his unit had been operating around Kostiantynivka for approximately a year. The battalion defended Ukrainian positions, equipment and supply routes against Russian FPV drones, reconnaissance aircraft and larger attack drones.

== Structure ==
As of 2026, the brigade's structure is as follows:

- 44th Mechanized Brigade,
- Headquarters & Headquarters Company
  - Military Law-Enforcement Service
  - Security Platoon
- 1st Mechanized Battalion
- 2nd Mechanized Battalion
- 3rd Mechanized Battalion
- 21st Rifle Battalion (unit number A7105)
- 61st Rifle Battalion (unit number A4462)
- 62nd Rifle Battalion (unit number A4467)
- 64th Rifle Battalion (unit number A4553)
- Tank Battalion (Leopard 1A5)
- Unmanned Systems Battalion “Legion North”
- Brigade Artillery Group (2S1 Gvozdika)
  - Command and Artillery Reconnaissance Battery
  - Self-Propelled Artillery Battalion
  - Multiple Rocket Launcher Battalion
  - Anti-Tank Battalion
- Anti-Aircraft Defense Battalion
- Reconnaissance Company
- Attack Drone Company "Calyptra"
- Engineer Battalion
- Logistic Battalion
- Signal Company
- Maintenance Battalion
- Radar Company
- Medical Company
- Chemical, Biological, Radiological and Nuclear Defense Company
