= 5th Heavy Mechanized Brigade =

Ukrainian Ground Forces unit

5th Heavy Mechanized Brigade (2024 – present) 5th Tank Brigade (2016 – 2022, 2023 – 2024)
- Ukrainian: 5-а окрема важка механізована бригада
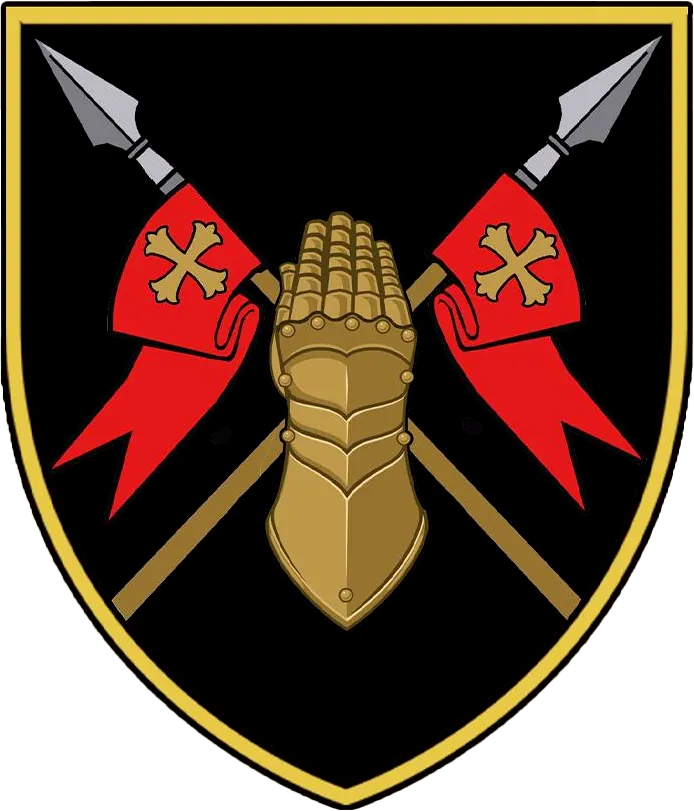
- Active: 2016 – 2022; 2023 – present
- Country: Ukraine
- Allegiance: Armed Forces of Ukraine
- Branch: Ukrainian Ground Forces
- Type: Mechanized Infantry
- Size: Brigade
- Part of: Operational Command East: 9th Army Corps
- Garrison/HQ: Kamianka-Buzka, Lviv Oblast
- Mottos: Courage, Strength, Professionalism
- Equipment: T-72; Leopard 1A5
- Engagements: War in Donbas; Joint Forces Operation; Russian invasion of Ukraine; Battle of Davydiv Brid; 2023 Ukrainian counteroffensive
- Decorations: For Courage and Bravery
- Website: 5ovmbr.army

Commanders
- Current commander: Lieutenant Colonel Ruslan Habinet

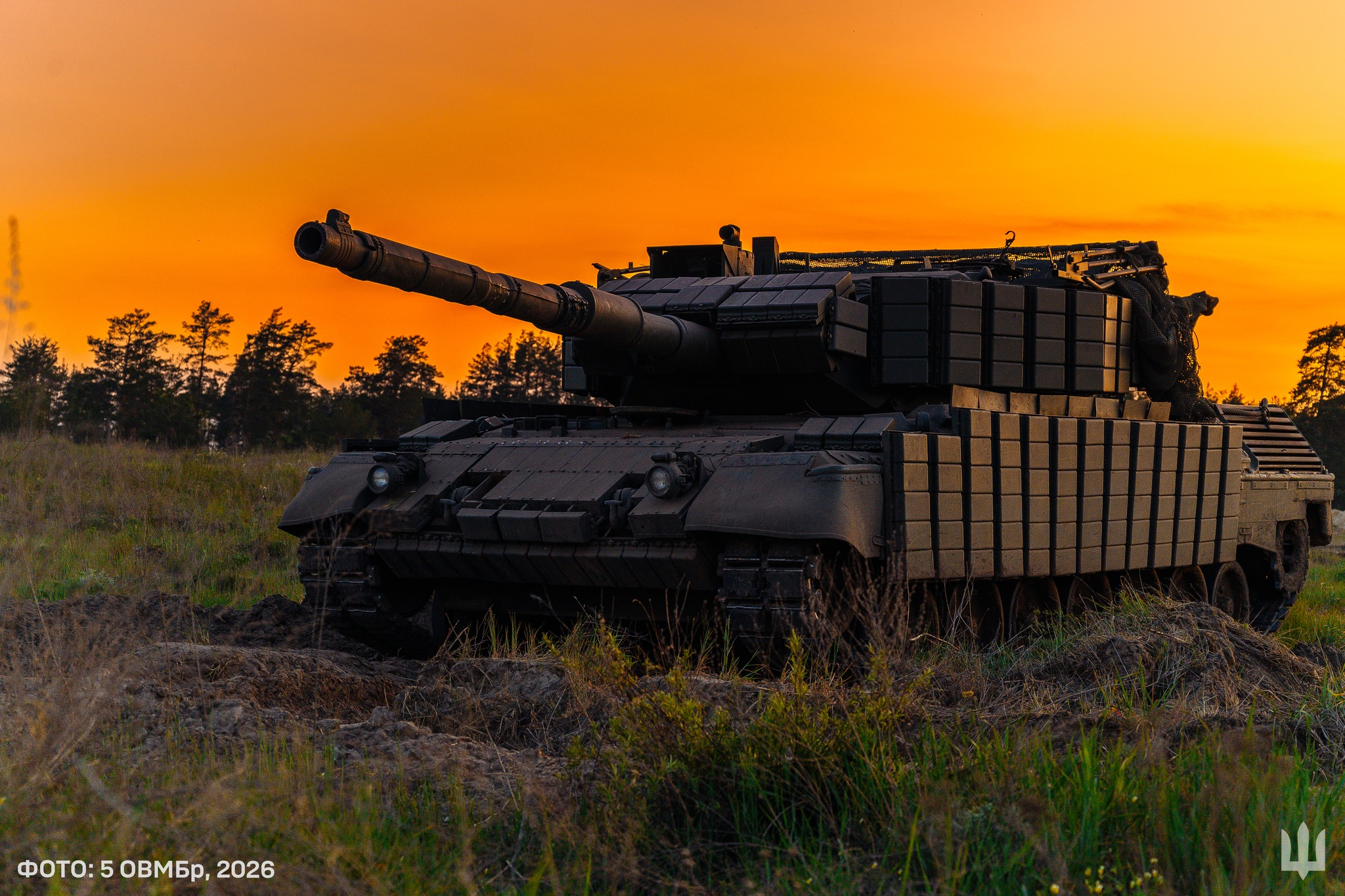
Leopard 1A5 of the Brigade with ERA and anti drone cages

The 5th Heavy Mechanized Brigade (MUN A4594 | Ukrainian: 5-а окрема важка механізована бригада) is a brigade of the Ukrainian Ground Forces.

== History ==
=== Formation ===
The brigade was formed in 2016, initially equipped with 30 T-72 tanks. From late March to early April, the brigade took part in large scale exercises of Operational Command South, held in Kherson Oblast. The goal of the exercise was to improve elements of overall defense of the region. At the end of the exercise it was announced that the brigade would be stationed close to the border with Russian-controlled Crimea.

=== 2022 Russian invasion of Ukraine ===
When on 24 February 2022, Russia invaded Ukraine, the unit was deployed to the southwestern part of the country near Odesa. As of May, it was still in the Odesa area.

In February 2022, the brigade was re-created in Kryvyi Rih to reinforce Ukrainian defense. However, due to heavy losses in other armored and mechanized brigades, tanks and manpower were used to replenish already existing units, and the brigade ceased to exist again. David Axe writing for Forbes, suggested that the brigade was inactive in August 2022.

However, the brigade was mentioned by President Volodymyr Zelenskyy in his 200 days of war speech on 11 September 2022.

=== 2023 ===
In March 2023, the brigade has been reactivated and is currently at the stage of formation. In July 2023, the unit received a new insignia and became a part of the 10th Army Corps. It then participated in the 2023 Ukrainian counteroffensive.

=== 2024 ===
In late 2024, the brigade was reformed into the 5th Heavy Mechanized Brigade.

=== 2026 ===
On 15 July 2026, President Volodymyr Zelenskyy awarded the unit the honorary "For Courage and Bravery".

== Structure ==
As of 2023 the brigade's structure is as follows:

- 5th Heavy Mechanized Brigade
  - Brigade Headquarters and Headquarters Company
  - 1st Tank Battalion
  - 2nd Tank Battalion
  - 3rd Tank Battalion
  - Mechanized Infantry Battalion
  - Artillery Group
    - Headquarters & Target Acquisition Battery
    - Self-propelled Artillery Battalion (2S3 Akatsiya)
    - Self-propelled Artillery Battalion (2S1 Gvozdika)
    - Rocket Artillery Battalion (BM-21 Grad)
    - Anti-Tank Artillery Battalion
    - Anti-Aircraft Defense Artillery Battalion
  - Reconnaissance Company
  - Combat Engineer Battalion
  - Logistic Battalion
  - Maintenance Battalion
  - Signal Company
  - Radar Company
  - Medical Company
  - CBRN Protection Company
  - Brigade Band

== Past commanders ==
- Colonel Melnyk
