= 4th Heavy Mechanized Brigade =

Ukrainian Ground Forces unit

4th Heavy Mechanized Brigade (2025 – present) 4th Tank Brigade (2017 – 2025)
- 4-та окрема танкова бригада
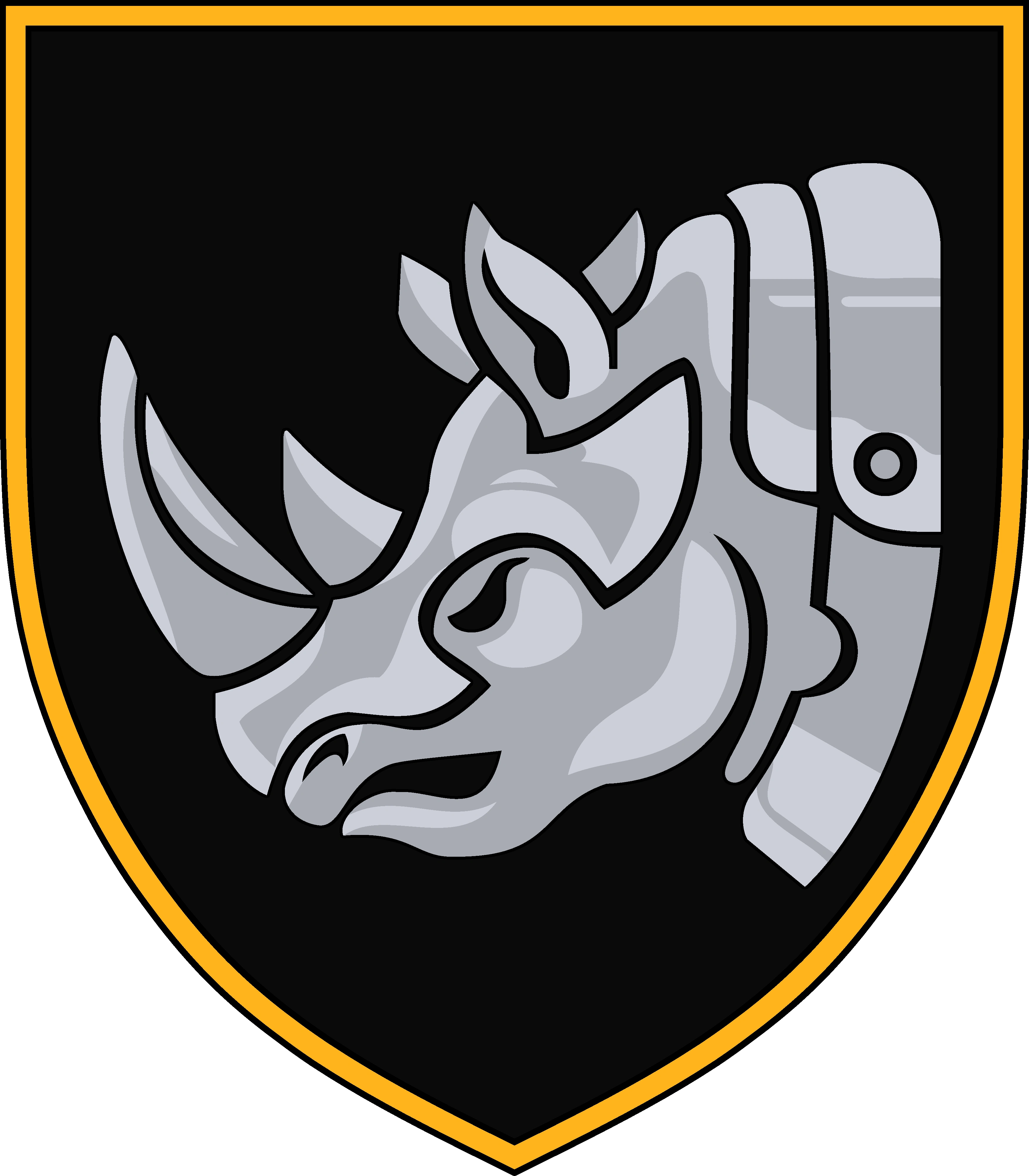
- Shoulder sleeve patch
- Active: December 6, 2017 - Today
- Country: Ukraine
- Branch: Ground Forces
- Type: Mechanized Infantry
- Part of: Operational Command North; 9th Army Corps
- Garrison/HQ: Honcharivske, Chernihiv Oblast
- Patron: Ivan Vyhovsky
- Motto: Rage Controls Our Weapons!
- Engagements: Russo-Ukrainian War; Russian invasion of Ukraine; Eastern Ukraine campaign; Battle of Kharkiv

Commanders
- Current commander: Oleh Chernov

The 4th Heavy Mechanized Brigade is a brigade of the Ukrainian Ground Forces.

== History ==
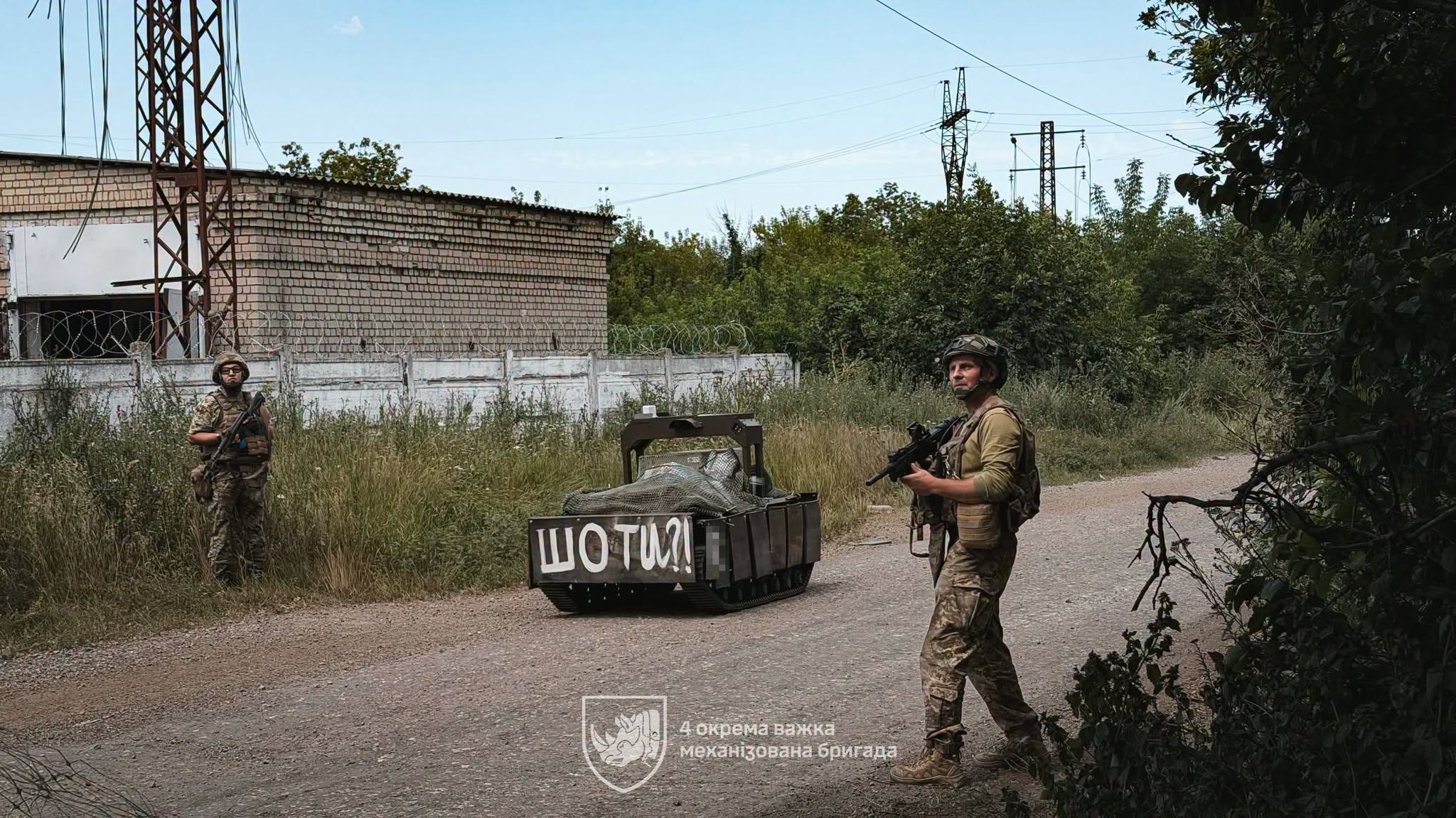
Logistics UGV with the Brigade

The 4th Tank Brigade was established in late 2017 with the purpose of serving as a reserve unit to the 1st and 17th Tank Brigades within the Ukrainian Armed Forces. It was equipped with T-64 and T-72 tanks. The brigade underwent training and preparation for combat, including a final stage of combat readiness at Honcharivske training base, the home of the 1st Tank Brigade, in July 2018.

During the Russo-Ukrainian War in 2019, the 4th Brigade was sent to the Joint Forces Operation Zone to support the 72nd Mechanized and 36th Marines brigades. The brigade was equipped with T-72 and BMP-2 IFVs, and various artillery pieces. In October of that year, the brigade participated in a joint exercise that involved crossing a river, supported by attack helicopters, and attacking suspected enemy positions.

When Russia invaded Ukraine in February 2022, the 4th Tank Brigade was deployed to help defend the northeastern part of the country. The brigade played a significant role in the battle of Kharkiv and subsequent Eastern Ukraine offensive. It was initially deployed in the area of Sloviansk-Kramatorsk as a reserve unit and later stationed south of Izium. According to Ukrainian military journalist Yurii Butusov, the 4th Tank Brigade took part in the major Ukrainian offensive in the Kharkiv Oblast in September 2022.

On August 1st, 2025, the 4th Tank Brigade was stripped of its third tank battalion in accordance with its conversion to a Heavy Mechanized Brigade. It was the last Ukrainian Ground Forces unit to be thus converted.

== Insignia ==
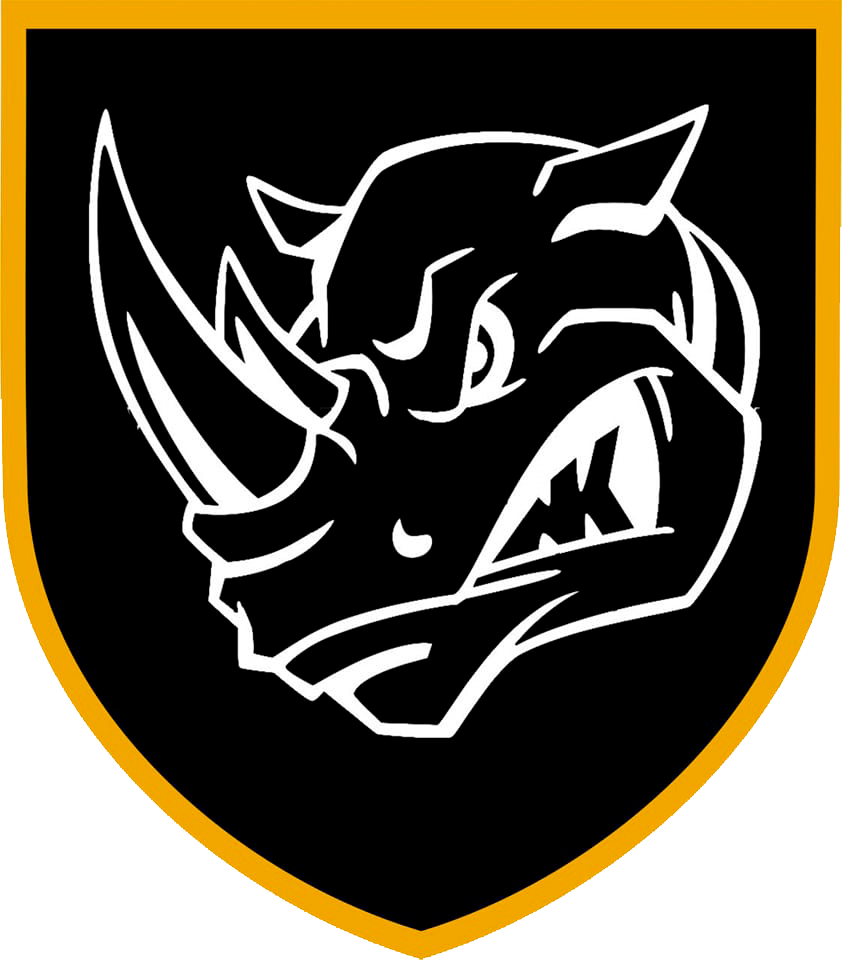
First shoulder sleeve insignia

Second shoulder shoulder sleeve insignia

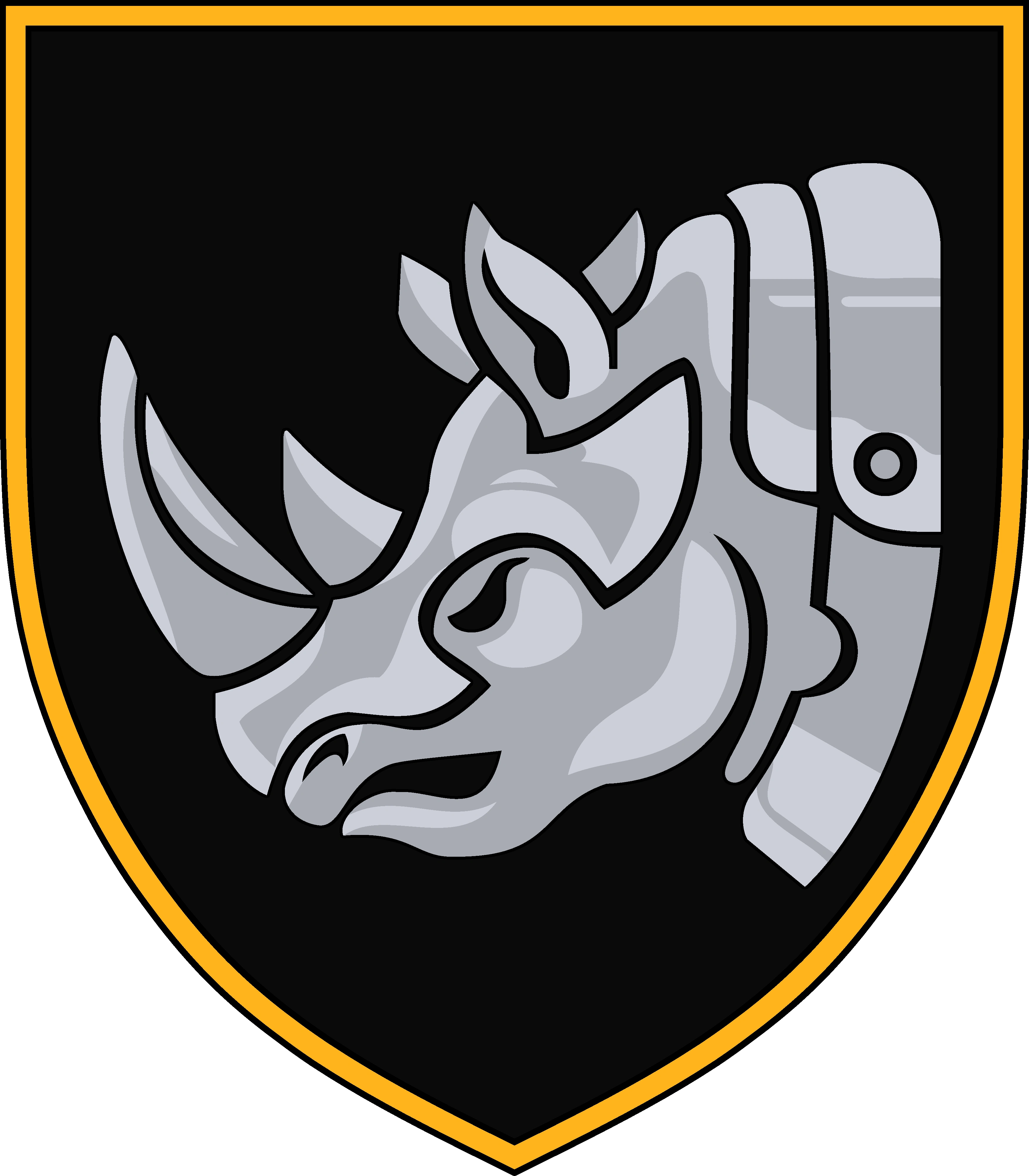
Current shoulder sleeve insignia

== Structure ==
As of 2023 the brigade's structure was as follows:

- 4th Heavy Mechanized Brigade
  - 4th Tank Brigade
  - Brigade Headquarters and HQ Company
    - 1st Tank Battalion
    - 2nd Tank Battalion
    - 3rd Tank Battalion
    - 4th Tank Battalion
    - Mechanized Infantry Battalion
    - Field Artillery Regiment
      - HQ and HQ Battery
      - Anti-Tank Battalion
    - Anti-Aircraft Missile Defense Battalion
    - Reconnaissance Company
    - Combat Engineer Battalion
    - Logistic Battalion
    - Maintenance Battalion
    - Signal Company
    - Radar Company
    - Medical Company
    - CBRN Protection Company
    - MP Platoon
    - Brigade Band
