= Rocket Forces and Artillery (Ukraine) =

- Ракетні війська та артилерія
- The Rocket Forces and Artillery branch insignia, 2016
- Active: 1992–present
- Country: Ukraine
- Branch: Ukrainian Ground Forces
- Type: Artillery
- Anniversaries: December 4 (Note: From 1997 to 2024 the anniversary date was November 3, commemorating the start of the Soviet Red Army 1943 offensive on Kyiv.)

Commanders
- Current commander: Colonel Andriy Kolennikov

Insignia
- Rocket Forces and Artillery sleeve patch

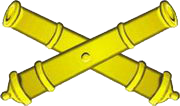
- Rocket Forces and Artillery branch insignia

The Rocket Forces and Artillery (abbr. RFA; Ukrainian: Ракетні війська та артилерія, romanized: Raketni viys’ka ta artyleriya, IPA: [rɐˈkɛt⁽ʲ⁾n⁽ʲ⁾i wijˈsʲkɑ tɐ ɐrtɪˈlɛr⁽ʲ⁾ijɐ]) of the Ukrainian Ground Forces consist of units armed with tactical missiles, howitzers, cannons, mortars, jet-propelled and anti-tank artillery. They are tasked to destroy human resources, tanks, artillery, anti-tank weapons, aircraft, air defense and other important installations operations.

== History ==
"On the eve of the professional holiday, the 19th rocket brigade, which is stationed in Khmelnytskyi city, conducted the main examination of the year - the final test for 2010–2011. All servicemen passed ..final exams for professional, military and physical training. The history of the brigade began in 1943 at Stalingrad by establishing the 7th Artillery brigade of the Reserve of the Supreme High Command. ..Twenty-seven soldiers, sergeants and officers of the division were nominated for the award "Hero of the Soviet Union" [during the Second World War]. After the declaration of Ukrainian independence and choice of non-nuclear status, servicemen swore allegiance to people of Ukraine. In November 1997, the division gained the status of a brigade and until 2004 it was subordinated to the 1st Rocket Division of the Ukrainian Ground Forces. For the last 8 years, the brigade is directly subordinated to the command of the land forces of the Armed Forces of Ukraine, armed with the "Tochka" missile. [It] is the only rocket military unit in the Armed Forces of Ukraine."

Following the dissolution of the Soviet Union, a number of Soviet Army field artillery divisions, the 26th, 55th and 81st, were given to the young Ukrainian Ground Forces, the 26th would serve the country for a further two decades until its 2004 disbandment. Joining them were the field artillery regiments under divisions and a number of divisional field artillery MRLS and TBM brigades and separate formations.

The 1st Rocket Division was active at Khmelnytskyi, formed on the basis of the disbanding headquarters of the Soviet 43rd Rocket Army. It was formed in 1998 as a UGF formation and instead of ICBMs was made up of TBM systems and MLRS. At least two brigades were part of the division, the 19th at Khmelnytskyi and the 107th at Kremenchuk (107th Rocket Artillery Regiment, 6th Army Corps (Ukraine)). The division was disbanded in 2004. (Vad777)

The 11th Artillery Brigade was disbanded in December 2013. The 44th Artillery Brigade was created from scratch at Ternopil in September 2014. The 43rd Artillery Brigade was formed in February 2015 in Divychky, a village in Kyiv Oblast.

The 27th Reactive Artillery Regiment was upgraded to a brigade on 13 March 2015. The 40th Artillery Brigade was formed at Pervomaisk in August 2015.

=== Russia-Ukraine War ===
After the collapse of the Soviet Union, Ukrainian Rocket Forces and Artillery were left over from the Cold War era. This means that most of its equipment is some 30 years old. There has been little development of new systems from 122mm or 152mm to 155 mm calibre. Of Ukrainian 155mm weapons built only the 2S22 Bohdana has been produced, with only one unit completed before the 2022 Russian invasion of Ukraine. The ammunition stockpiles that Ukraine inherited from the Soviet Union were the subject of sabotage. According to Radio Free Europe six stockpiles, a total of some 210,000 tons of ammunition, was destroyed between 2015 and 2019. Since late April 2022 the U.S. State Department has sold artillery ammunition to Ukraine. Ukrainian artillery has relied on old stockpiles in former Eastern Block countries for ammunition. Of 40 shells supplied by the Czech Republic only 3 worked. What the U.S. government calls "nonstandard ammunition" that can be fired from Ukrainian weapons such as 122 mm, 152 mm artillery shells, 120 mm mortar rounds and other smalls weapons. Ukraine claims that it is firing 6,000 projectiles daily in fighting. This compares to Russia firing an estimated 70,000 projectiles.

Ukraine has asked for and been supplied with various NATO artillery firing 155 mm calibre ammunition, such as the Panzerhaubitze 2000 and "M777, FH70, M109, AHS Krab, and the CAESAR self-propelled howitzer." The UK and Germany have supplied M270 MLRS to Ukraine and the U.S. has supplied the HIMARS system, however, in batches of single digits. Ukrainian forces consider 155 mm weapons such as the M777 to be superior to their older systems: "They work beautifully. They have the precision of a sniper rifle while firing a 155mm shell. Their range is much greater than our own weapons and we can hit their positions, supply lines, and munitions depots farther away." Russian Ministry of Defence has made point of showing the destruction of Western-supplied weapons, mainly the M777. While acknowledging their effect: "General Konashenkov stressed that in recent days the Ukrainian armed forces have used M777 intensively, subjecting massive artillery strikes to Russian positions in the region." Ukraine spends 30,000 rounds of 155 mm in two weeks, an amount fired by the US in a year.

Ukraine has also received 36 towed 105 mm calibre L119 light guns, a variant of the L118 light gun, from the UK. Some 36,000 rounds of 105 mm ammunition has been promised to Ukraine by the US. The New Zealand Defence Force sent 30 soldiers to train Ukrainian forces on the L119 in the UK from May to July 2022.

In early July UK and New Zealand soldiers were training Ukrainian soldiers to use the L119 howitzer and the M270 MLRS in Wiltshire. The number of Ukrainian soldiers trained is listed as "hundreds".

Ukrainian artillery is heavily reliant on drones for observation. Russian forces rely on mass artillery strikes. Ukraine faces a shortage of shells used compared to Russia. Estimates from various sources put the Ukrainian usage of shells from as low as 2,000 to 7,000 at the highest. Russia's daily usage is between 20,000-60,000. Jens Stoltenberg, Secretary General of NATO, puts it at four Russian shells fired for every one Ukrainian shell fired. Ukraine relies on various drones linked to tablets that use NATO compatible software. This data shares locations and allows Ukrainian forces to correct fire more quickly.

The advisor to the Ukrainian President Volodymyr Zelenskyy, Oleksiy Arestovych said in March 2022 that it might take sixty to ninety shells to destroy a position. With drone guidance however it was reduced to just nine shells. Drones also allow one gun to be tasked to one target instead of several firing as a battery. It also allows other weapons from T-64 tanks down to AGS-17 Plamya grenade launcher to act in an indirect fire role.

== Lineage of the Ukrainian Field Artillery ==
The 26th, 55th and 81st FA Divisions of the UGF and its 1st Rocket Field Artillery Division, as well as the divisional and later brigade field artillery regiments, together with the divisional and later brigade anti-tank battalions (and sometimes regiments), constituted for years since independence the Rocket Forces and Field Artillery Corps of the UGF till the 55th Brigade was created on the basis of the 55th Division. All of these sans the anti-tank battalions under brigades kept until the 2010s Soviet orders and decorations until these were removed from unit titles and their colours. In the 2000s, the former divisional regiments became field artillery brigades and the field artillery regiments under the brigade framework.

=== Organization of the Ukrainian field artillery division until the 2000s ===
- Division HQ and HQ Battery
- Target Acquisition Battery
- 3 × Field Artillery Brigades/Regiments
- MLRS Field Artillery Brigade/Regiment
- Tactical Missile Field Artillery Brigade/Regiment (within 1st Rocket Field Artillery Division (TBM))
- Anti-Tank Artillery Regiment
- Reconnaissance Battalion
- Artillery Replacement Battalion
- Maintenance Battalion
- Forward Logistics Battalion
- Ordnance and Armaments Battalion
- Training Regiment/Brigade
- Signals Battalion
- Radar Company/Battalion

== Organization of the Rocket Forces and Field Artillery ==
The RF&FA, as one of the UGF's paramount combat support branches, has been Westernized slowly following Euromaidan and in a faster pace since the Russian invasion in 2022. These brigades of the field artillery, a leftover from former Soviet practice, provide huge combat support capabilities to the men and women of formations of the Ukrainian Ground Forces in combat operations in wartime and peacetime exercises in support of its paramount missions to the nation.

Field Artillery Brigades are designed to provide heavy combat support to the infantry (mechanized, assault infantry, motorized, mountain mechanized and rifle mechanized/motorized) and armored brigades during offensive and defensive operations in wartime and peacetime exercises, as well as provide reinforcement motorized infantry to operational duties in support of the principal missions of the Ground Forces as well as to provide security and protection to the gunners and the systems they use. These may be armed with either towed and/or self-propelled field guns.

Multiple Rocket Launcher Field Artillery Brigades are designed to provide direct fires support to mechanized infantry and armored brigades and can easily deliver saturation fire over enemy positions in offensive operations or to rear areas in the defensive. This is the same mission of the 19th Missile FA Brigade, but its focus is also to destroy enemy ground installations.

The Brigade Field Artillery Regiments and Anti-Tank Artillery Battalions of the mechanized, motorized, mountain, assault infantry and rifle infantry and armored brigades provide direct fires support to their subordinate formations and anti-tank warfare ops. The two mountain infantry brigades' regiments operate the same systems but are used as mountain artillery.

== Equipment ==
- Tochka U, Maritime Brimstone, FP-9 tactical ballistic missiles
- S-200 Angara converted surface-to-surface ground launched short-to-medium range cruise missile
- FP-5 Flamingo ground launched medium-to-long range cruise missile
- M270 ATACMS MLRS, M142 HIMARS-ATACMS tactical ballistic missiles/heavy MLRS
- AGM-114 Hellfire Land-based man-portable semi-activelaser homing anti-materiel missile, can also be truck mounted
- BM 21-Grad, BM-21 Bastion-1, APR-40, Tornado-G, BM-21 Verba, BM-27 Uragan, BM-27 Bastion-3, BM-27 Burevyi, BM-30 Smerch, BM-30 Vilkha, M270 LRU, M142 HIMARS, M142 HIMARS-GLSDB, RM-70, TRG-230, S-8 truck mounted multiple rocket launcher systems
- M270, M270 GLSDB, TOS-1 Buratino, MT-LB S-8, MLT-LB S-5, MT-LB Grad, MT-LB Grad-1 tracked multiple rocket launcher systems
- 2S1 Gvozdika, 2S3 Akatsiya, 2S5 Giatsint-S, 2S7 Pion, 2S19 Msta-S, PzH 2000, M109, AHS Krab, AS-90, T-155 Fırtına, MT-LB D-44, MT-LB D-30 tracked self-propelled artillery howitzers
- 2S22 Bohdana, CAESAR, Archer Artillery System, 152mm SpGH DANA, 155 mm SpGH Zuzana wheeled self-propelled artillery howitzers
- D-30, D-20, M-46, 2A65 Msta-B, 2A36 Giatsint-B, M114, M777, M101, FH70, L119, M119, TRF1, OTO Melara Mod 56, 2P22 Bohdana towed howitzers
- 9K114 Shturm, 9M113 Konkurs, 2A29/MT-12 Rapira towed anti-tank guns
- MT-LB-12 (TD) tracked tank destroyers
- Pansarvärnspjäs 1110 anti-tank towed recoilless rifles
- 82 mm and 120 mm mortars (both from Western and Soviet manufacture)
- 2S9 Nona, Panzermörser M113 and Bars-8MMk tracked self propelled mortars (the first also used by the Air Assault Forces)
- M120 Rak wheeled self-propelled mortars

Already in production and soon to be inducted:

- 1KR1 Sapsan tactical ballistic missile

Under development for the RF&A:

- Korshun-2 cruise missile

Future acquisitions:

- Boxer RCH-155 wheeled self-propelled artillery howitzers
- Eva wheeled self-propelled artillery howitzers (to be produced under license)

Retired from the RF&A:

- R-17 Elbrus tactical ballistic missile

== Units ==
=== Brigades ===
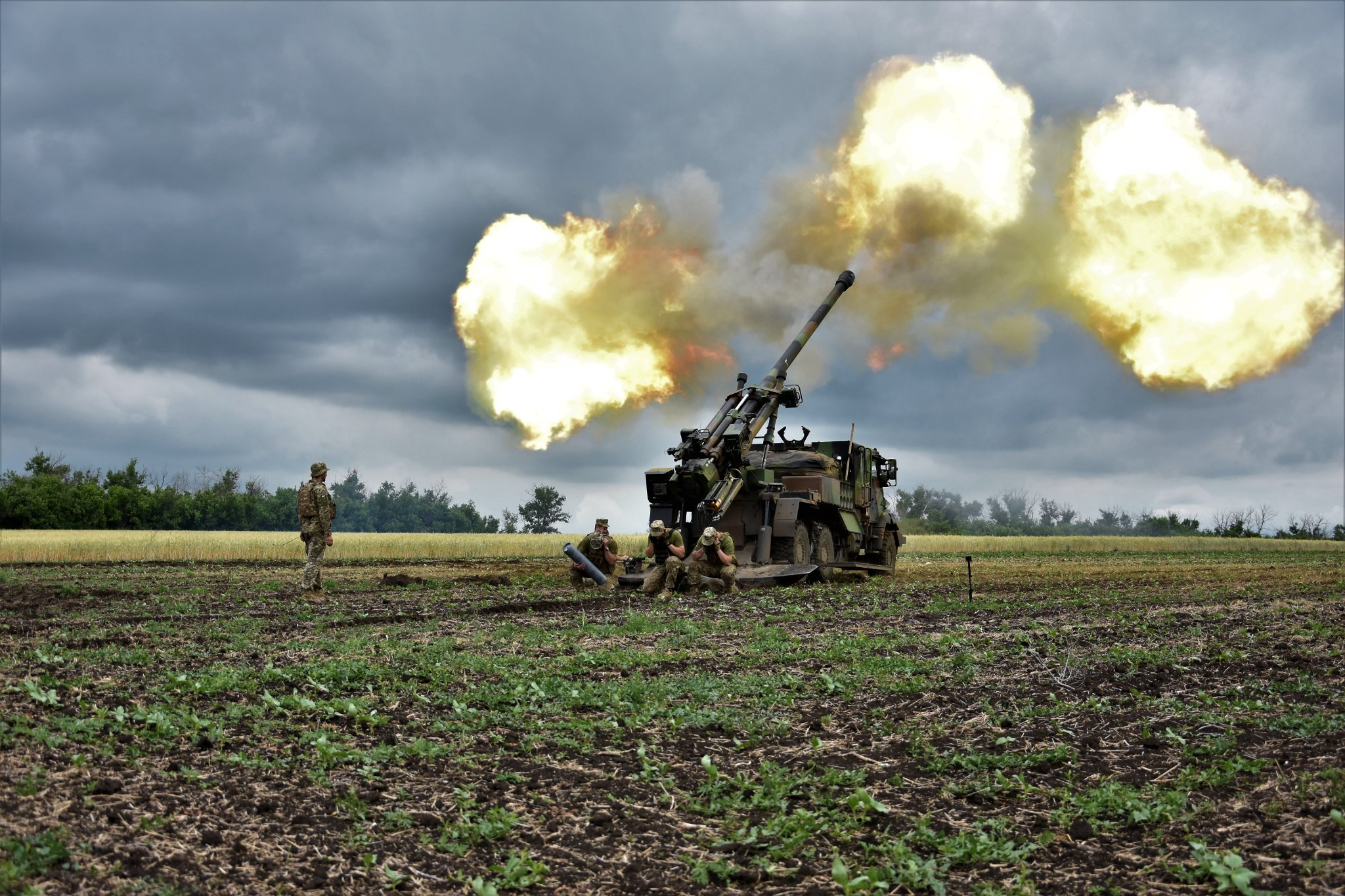
French CAESAR self-propelled howitzer of 55th Artillery Brigade, 2022

- 15th Artillery Reconnaissance Brigade "Kyiv", in Drohobych, Lviv Oblast (BM-30 Smerch, M142 HIMARS)
- 19th Missile Brigade "Saint Barbara", in Khmelnytskyi, Khmelnytskyi Oblast (BM-30 Smerch, M142 HIMARS, Tochka-U)
- 26th Artillery Brigade "Roman Dachkevitch", in Berdychiv, Zhytomyr Oblast (2S22 Bohdana, AHS Krab)
- 27th Artillery Brigade "Petro Kalnyshevsky", in Sumy, Sumy Oblast (2S22 Bohdana, BM-27 Uragan)
- 40th Artillery Brigade "Grand Knyaz Vytautas", in Pervomaisk, Mykolaiv Oblast (2A36 Hiatsint-B, 2A65 Msta-B, 2P22 Bohdana, 2S22 Bohdana, AHS Krab, BM-27 Uragan, M777, MT-12 Rapira)
- 43rd Artillery Brigade "Hetman Taras Triasylo", in Pyriatyn, Poltava Oblast (2S7 Pion, Archer, PzH 2000)
- 44th Artillery Brigade "Danylo Apostol", in Ternopil, Ternopil Oblast (2A36 Hiatsint-B, 2A65 Msta-B, 2S22 Bohdana, FH70, M777, MT-12 Rapira, RM-70)
- 45th Artillery Brigade, in Yavoriv, Lviv Oblast (2A65 Msta-B, 2S22 Bohdana, Archer, FH70, M777, MT-12 Rapira)
- 47th Artillery Brigade, in Kharkiv, Kharkiv Oblast (2A36 Hiatsint-B, 2A65 Msta-B, 2P22 Bohdana, 2S22 Bohdana, M109A6)
- 48th Artillery Brigade, in Poltava, Poltava Oblast (2S22 Bohdana, BM-27 Uragan)
- 49th Artillery Brigade "Mstislav the Brave", in Chernihiv, Chernihiv Oblast (2A65 Msta-B, 2S22 Bohdana, AS-90, TRG-230)
- 52nd Artillery Brigade
- 54th Artillery Brigade
- 55th Artillery Brigade "Zaporozhian Sich", in Zaporizhzhia, Zaporizhzhia Oblast (2A36 Hiatsint-B, 2A65 Msta-B, 2P22 Bohdana, Caeser, MT-12 Rapira, RM-70)
- 60th Artillery Brigade, in Pervomaisk, Mykolaiv Oblast
- 68th Artillery Brigade, in Berdychiv, Zhytomyr Oblast
- 107th Rocket Artillery Brigade, in Kremenchuk, Poltava Oblast (BM-30 Smerch, Vilkha, M270A1 MLRS)

One additional artillery brigade is a part of the Ukrainian Navy and two additional artillery brigades are part of the Ukrainian Air Assault Forces and two additional brigades are part of the Ukrainian Marine Corps, respectively:

- 32nd Artillery Brigade, in Altestove, Odesa Oblast (2A36 Hiatsint-B, 2S22 Bohdana)
- 147th Artillery Brigade
- 148th Artillery Brigade, in Zhytomyr, Zhytomyr Oblast (2S3 Akatsiya, BM-21 Grad, Caesar, M777)
- 360th Coastal Missile Brigade, in Odesa, Odesa Oblast
- 406th Artillery Brigade "Oleksiy Almazov", in Mykolaiv, Mykolaiv Oblast (2A36 Hiatsint-B, 2S22 Bohdana, D-20, M777, MT-12 Rapira)

=== Brigade artillery groups/regiments of the AFU ===
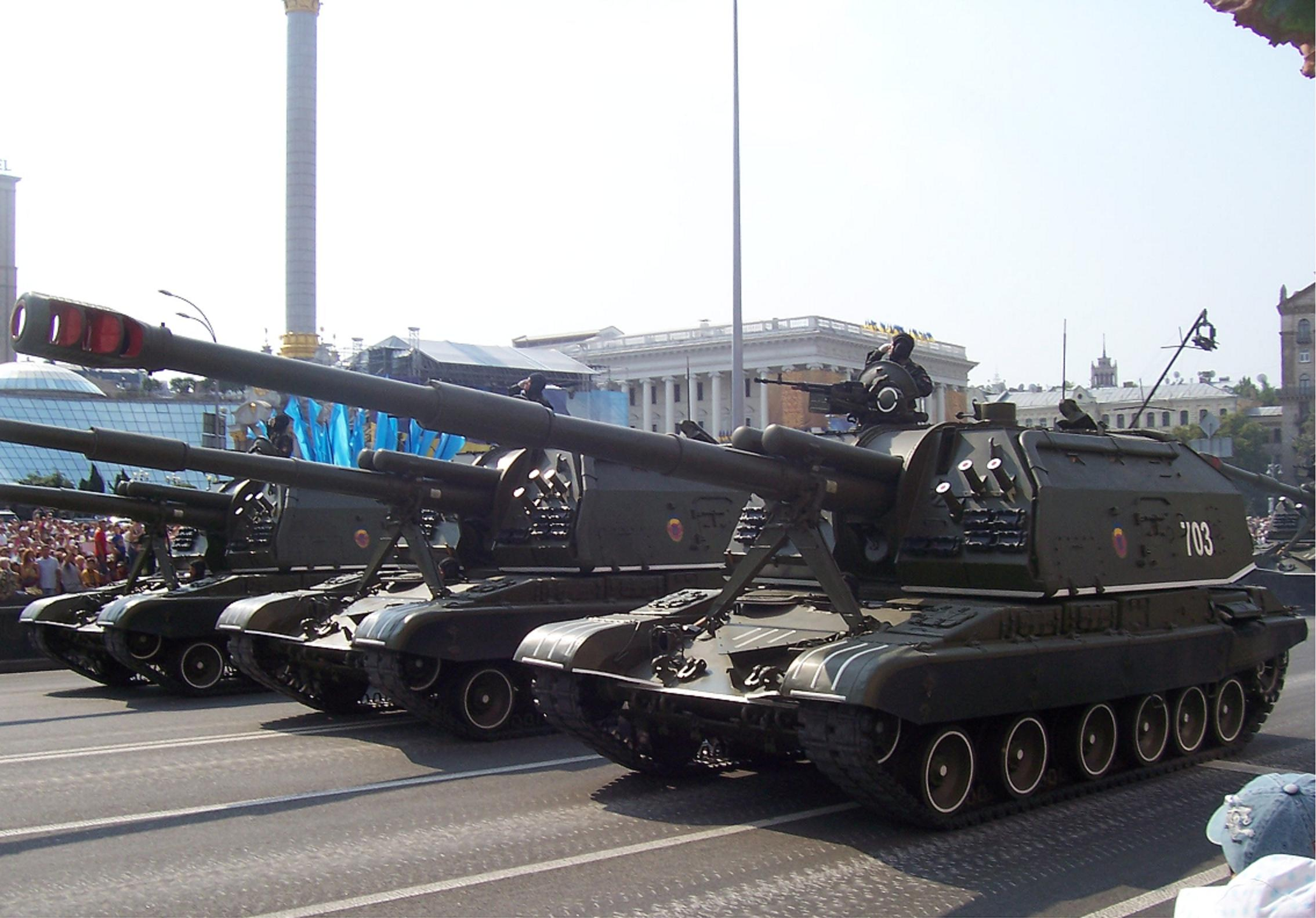
Ukrainian 2S19 Msta self-propelled artillery units

==== Assigned to the Armored Corps and Mechanized Infantry ====
- 1st Heavy Mechanized Brigade Artillery Group
- 3rd Heavy Mechanized Brigade Artillery Group
- 4th Heavy Mechanized Brigade Artillery Group
- 5th Heavy Mechanized Brigade Artillery Group
- 10th Mountain Assault Brigade Artillery Group (Mountain)
- 11th Motorized Brigade Artillery Group
- 13th Jaeger Brigade Artillery Group
- 14th Mechanized Brigade Artillery Group
- 15th Mechanized Brigade Artillery Group
- 17th Heavy Mechanized Brigade Artillery Group
- 21st Mechanized Brigade Artillery Group
- 22nd Mechanized Brigade Artillery Group
- 23rd Mechanized Brigade Artillery Group
- 24th Mechanized Brigade Artillery Group
- 28th Mechanized Brigade Artillery Group
- 30th Mechanized Brigade Artillery Group
- 31st Mechanized Brigade Artillery Group
- 32nd Mechanized Brigade Artillery Group
- 33rd Mechanized Brigade Artillery Group
- 41st Mechanized Brigade Artillery Group
- 42nd Mechanized Brigade Artillery Group
- 43rd Mechanized Brigade Artillery Group
- 44th Mechanized Brigade Artillery Group
- 47th Mechanized Brigade Artillery Group
- 53rd Mechanized Brigade Artillery Group
- 54th Mechanized Brigade Artillery Group
- 56th Motorized Brigade Artillery Group
- 57th Motorized Brigade Artillery Group
- 58th Motorized Brigade Artillery Group
- 59th Assault Brigade Artillery Group
- 60th Mechanized Brigade Artillery Group
- 61st Mechanized Brigade Artillery Group
- 62nd Mechanized Brigade Artillery Group
- 63rd Mechanized Brigade Artillery Group
- 65th Mechanized Brigade Artillery Group
- 66th Mechanized Brigade Artillery Group
- 67th Mechanized Brigade Artillery Group
- 68th Jaeger Brigade Artillery Group
- 72nd Mechanized Brigade Artillery Group
- 88th Mechanized Brigade Artillery Group
- 92nd Assault Brigade Artillery Group
- 93rd Mechanized Brigade Artillery Group
- 110th Mechanized Brigade Artillery Group
- 115th Mechanized Brigade Artillery Group
- 116th Mechanized Brigade Artillery Group
- 117th Mechanized Brigade Artillery Group
- 118th Mechanized Brigade Artillery Group
- 128th Mountain Assault Brigade Artillery Group (Mountain)
- 141st Mechanized Brigade Artillery Group
- 142nd Mechanized Brigade Artillery Group
- 143rd Mechanized Brigade Artillery Group
- 144th Mechanized Brigade Artillery Group

==== Assigned to other branches ====
- Brigade Artillery Groups/Regiments of the UkrAAF
- Marine Artillery Regiments of Marine Brigades under UkrMC

=== Other units ===
- 6th Artillery Training Regiment, in Divychky

=== Outside the Armed Forces but operationally controlled in wartime ===
- Field Artillery Battalions of the National Guard of Ukraine
