= 15th Artillery Reconnaissance Brigade =

15th Artillery Reconnaissance Brigade 15th Rocket Artillery Regiment (2003-2022) 337th Rocket Artillery Brigade (1989-2003)
- 15-та окрема бригада артилерійської розвідки «Чорний ліс»
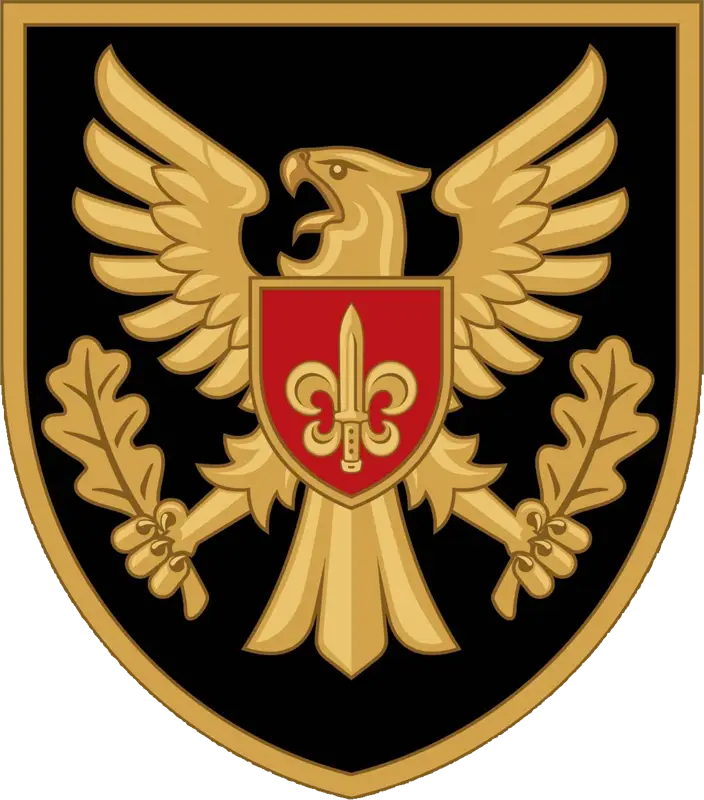
- Founded: 6 August 1942
- Country: Soviet Union (1942–1991); Ukraine (since 1992)
- Allegiance: Armed Forces of Ukraine
- Branch: Ukrainian Ground Forces
- Type: Rocket and Artillery Forces
- Role: Artillery and Reconnaissance
- Size: Brigade
- Part of: Operational Command West
- Garrison/HQ: Drogobych, Lviv Oblast
- Nickname: Black Forest
- Mottos: "Lightning Fast and Accurate"
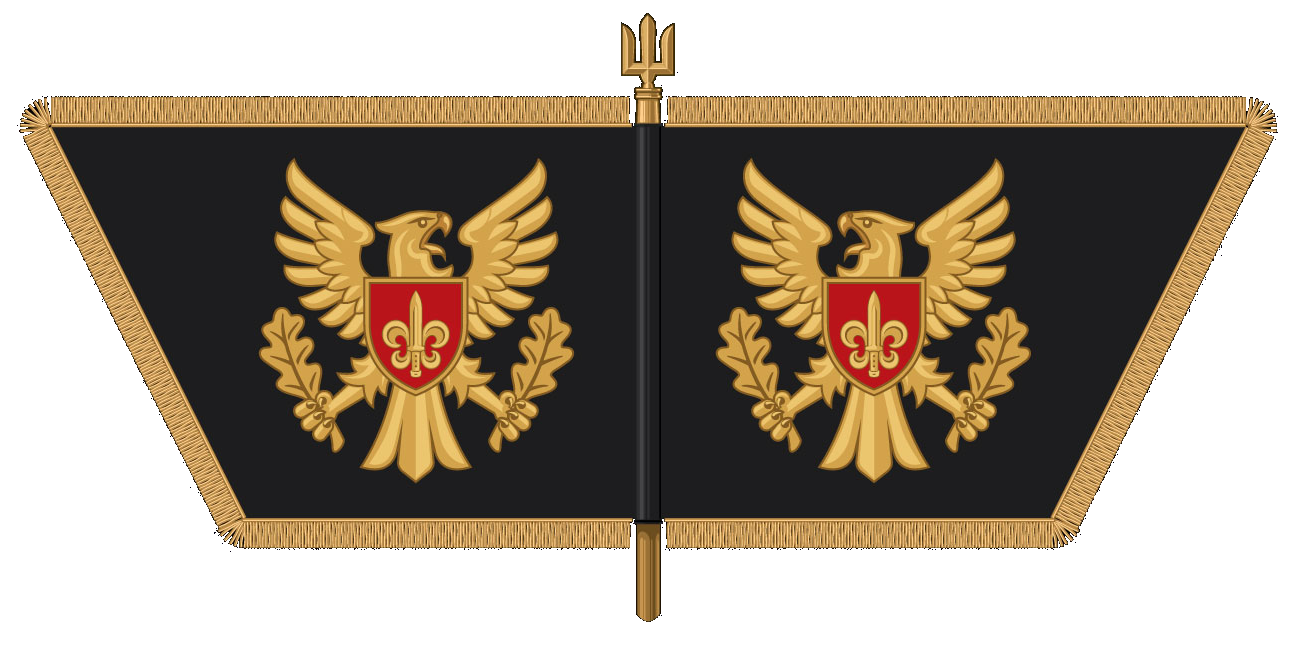
- Colours
- Engagements: Russo-Ukrainian War; War in Donbass; Russian invasion of Ukraine
- Decorations: For Courage and Bravery
- Website: Website

Commanders
- Current commander: Colonel Alexander Popov

Insignia
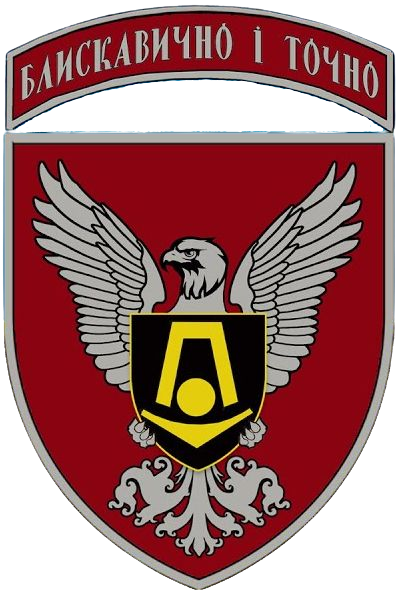
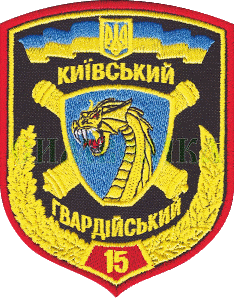
- Former Insignia

The 15th Separate Artillery Reconnaissance Brigade "Black Forest" (MUN A1108) is an artillery and reconnaissance Brigade of the Ukrainian Ground Forces directly subordinated to the Ground Forces command but is currently operationally subordinated to the Operational Command West. It operates a variety of artillery and drone systems including western, indigenous and Soviet era weapons.

== History ==
On 24 August 1991, the 337th Rocket Artillery Brigade of the Red Army was subordinated to Ukraine following the Dissolution of the Soviet Union and took the oath of allegiance to Ukraine on 12 December 1991. In 1998, the first rocket artillery division "Smerch" of the 337th rocket artillery brigade carried out combat launches at the Chauda military training ground.

On 20 August 2003, it became 15th Rocket Artillery Regiment and was recognized as the best unit of the Operational Command West. In 2008, the 1st Rocket Artillery Division of the 15th Rocket Artillery Regiment performed live fire training at the Chauda military training ground. On 4 May 2006, the regiment was awarded a Battle Banner. On 21 August 2008, it received the honorary title of "Drohobych". In June 2012, the regiment's personnel took part in the 20th review-competition for the best organization of physical training and sports in the Armed Forces of Ukraine performing in over a hundred categories and took the first spot.

=== Russo-Ukrainian war ===
Since April 2014, the 15th Guards Rocket Artillery Regiment has been involved in the War in Donbass. On 26 August 2014, a soldier of the regiment, Komar Yuri Igorovich was killed as a result of a firearms attack on a travelling convoy near Heorhiivka, Luhansk Oblast. On 18 November 2015, all Soviet awards and references were stripped from the regiment's title. Two units of the AN/TPQ-36 Firefinder radar were transferred to the regiment on 17 August 2018.

Video showing the destruction the two S-400 on 14 December 2025

Following the Russian invasion of Ukraine, it saw direct combat against Russian forces. On 7 July 2022, a soldier of the brigade, Bordun Ivan was killed by Russian artillery shelling shelling near Siversk during the Battle of Bakhmut. In September 2022, it was participating in the 2022 Kharkiv counteroffensive.

The recon elements of the Brigade have been observed using Shark drones to guide British Storm Shadow missiles into targets and was able to destroy a Russian platoon command post.

On 4 December 2024 the unit was awarded the honorary award For Courage and Bravery by the President of Ukraine Volodymyr Zelenskyy.

On November 16, 2024, the unit attacked a concentration of Russian troops, approximately 30–40 men, near Tavria. The strike was carried out using M142 HIMARS missiles, and the troop concentration had been previously reconnoitered by a drone from the 128th Mountain Assault Brigade. More than 20 Russian soldiers were reported killed. Shortly afterward, as additional troops arrived to evacuate the wounded, the brigade conducted a double tap strike using cluster munitions to maximize casualties.

On July 21, 2026, the unit conducted an operation targeting the Khalino airfield in Kursk Oblast, striking a Russian MiG-29 fighter jet and a Pantsir missile system.

== List of destroyed Systems ==
Type	Role	Note	Date
S-300 S-350 S-400 9K37 Buk	SAM	Around 30 Systems destroyed	2022–2023
Leer-2	EW	Destroyed, most likely by HIMARS	28 August 2023
Predel-E	RADAR	Destroyed, most likely by HIMARS	28 August 2023
9K330 Tor	SAM	Destroyed	20 January 2024
BM-21	MLRS	Multiple BM-21 Destroyed in Luhansk Oblast	January 2024
Podlet-1K	RADAR	Spotted in cooperation with Kabul 9 and destroyed by WB-Electronics-Warmate	27 April 2024
Supercam S350	UAV	Destroyed with crew	4 July 2024
1K148 Yastreb-AW	RADAR	Destroyed by HIMARS	8 September 2024
Zoopark-1M	RADAR	Destroyed by HIMARS or M270.	12 December 2024
Pansir S-1	SAM	Destroyed by HIMARS	31 December 2024
96L6E	RADAR	96L6E RADAR of a S-300-Battery destroyed	27 January 2025
S-350	SAM	Destroyed	16 February 2025
9S36	RADAR	9S36 RADAR for Buk destroyed	12 March 2025
Buk-M1	SAM	Destroyed	21 March 2025
R-330Zh Zhitel	EW	Damaged or destroyed	24 March 2025
9A316	Rearm SAM	9A316 rearming vehicle for Buk-2M destroyed by drone	6 April 2025
BM-27 Uragan	MLRS	Destroyed with GMLRS via HIMARS	16 April 2025
Buk-M2 9A316	SAM Rearm	A launcher and a rearming vehicle destroyed	21 April 2025
Buk-M3	SAM	Destroyed	1 May 2025
Buk-M1	SAM	Destroyed	7 May 2025
Buk-M1	SAM	Destroyed	16 May 2025
Buk-M3	SAM	Destroyed	24 May 2025
Tor-M2	SAM	Destroyed by rocket double strike	31 May 2025
Zoopark-1M	RADAR	Damaged or destroyed	4 June 2025
2S7 Pion	SPH	Destroyed	12 June 2025
Buk-M1	SAM	Destroyed by the 413th Regiment of Unmanned Systems, assisted by the 15th brigade	8 July 2025
Buk-M3	SAM	Damaged or destroyed by drone	13 July 2025
D-30	Howitzer	Destroyed	22 August 2025
Buk-M2	SAM	Destroyed	5 September 2025
Buk-M2	SAM	Destroyed	17 September 2025
Buk-M3	SAM	Destroyed	25 Oktober 2025
Buk-M3	SAM	Destroyed by drone	4 November 2025
T-90	Tank	Damaged or destroyed by drone	14 November 2025
D-30	Howitzer	Damaged or destroyed by drone	14 November 2025
S-400	SAM	2 Launchers of a S-400 System destroyed, most likely part of the 568th Anti-Aircraft Missile Regiment	14 December 2025
Buk-M2	SAM	Destroyed by drone	17. December 2025
Torf-S	RADAR	Destroyed	14 January 2026
D-30	Howitzer	Gun and crew destroyed by cluster munition	6 February 2026
Pantsir-S1	SAM	Destroyed by drone	28 February 2026
Osa	SAM	Damaged or destroyed by drone	19 March 2026
Buk-M2	SAM	Damaged or destroyed by drone	29 March 2026
Zoopark-1M	RADAR	Destroyed by drone	5 April 2026
S-300V	SAM	Launcher und command system of a S-300V destroyed by Lasar's Group assisted by air reconnaissance by the 15th brigade	10 April 2026

== Equipment ==
Model	Image	Origin	Type	Number	Details
Artillery
BM-30 Smerch		Soviet Union	Heavy self-propelled 300 mm multiple rocket launcher	5+	
M142 HIMARS		United States	Light multiple rocket launcher		
M270 MLRS		United States	Armored self-propelled multiple launch rocket system		
Armored vehicles
BRDM-2		Soviet Union	Amphibious armoured reconnaissance vehicle		
RADARs
AN/TPQ-36 Firefinder radar		United States	Counter battery mobile radar	2	
Unmanned Aerial Vehicle
AeroVironment RQ-20 Puma		United States	Surveillance and intelligence electro-optical UAV		
DJI Mavic		China	FPV drone		
DeViRo Leleka-100 ("Stork")		Ukraine	Air reconnaissance/loitering munition		
Athlon Avia A1-CM Furia		Ukraine	Air reconnaissance		
ASU-1 Valkyrie		Ukraine	Air reconnaissance		
Ukrspecsystems Shark		Ukraine	Air reconnaissance		
Ukrspecsystems Mini Shark		Ukraine	Air reconnaissance		
Tekever AR3		Portugal	Autonomous VTOL ISTAR craft		

== Commanders ==
- Colonel Hryhoriy Demyanchyk (2012–2020)
- Colonel Oleksandr Popov (2022-)

== Popular culture ==
Until 2022, before becoming a brigade, the old sleeve insignia of the 15th Rocket Artillery Regiment depicted a shield with a dragon's head, surmounted by a small State Emblem of Ukraine, against a background of crossed cannon barrels. The dragon's head represents the power of missiles.

In July 2022, singer Viktor Vynnyk wrote the brigade's march, and presented it in his performance on 11 September.

== See also ==
- 107th Rocket Artillery Brigade
- 14th Radio Technical Brigade

== Weblinks ==
- Facebook
- YouTube
- Instagram
- X

== Sources ==
- Структура Сухопутних військ ЗС України
