= 40th Artillery Brigade (Ukraine) =

Ukrainian Ground Forces unit

- Active: 25 May 2015
- Country: Ukraine
- Branch: Ukrainian Ground Forces
- Type: Rocket and Artillery Forces
- Role: Artillery
- Size: Brigade
- Part of: Operational Command South
- Garrison/HQ: Pervomaisk, Ukraine
- Patron: Grand Duke Vytautas
- Engagements: Russo-Ukrainian War; War in Donbas; Russian invasion of Ukraine; Battle of Kharkiv; Battle of Donbas
- Decorations: For Courage and Bravery

Insignia
- Subdued SSI

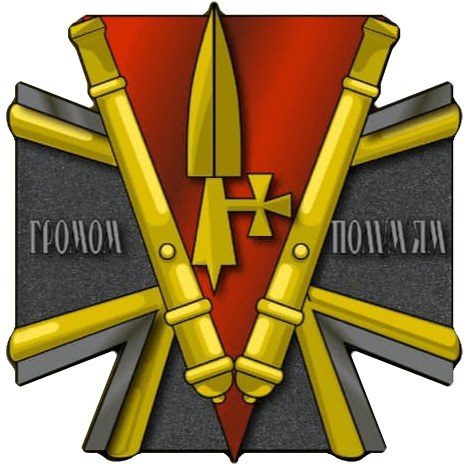
- Honorary badge

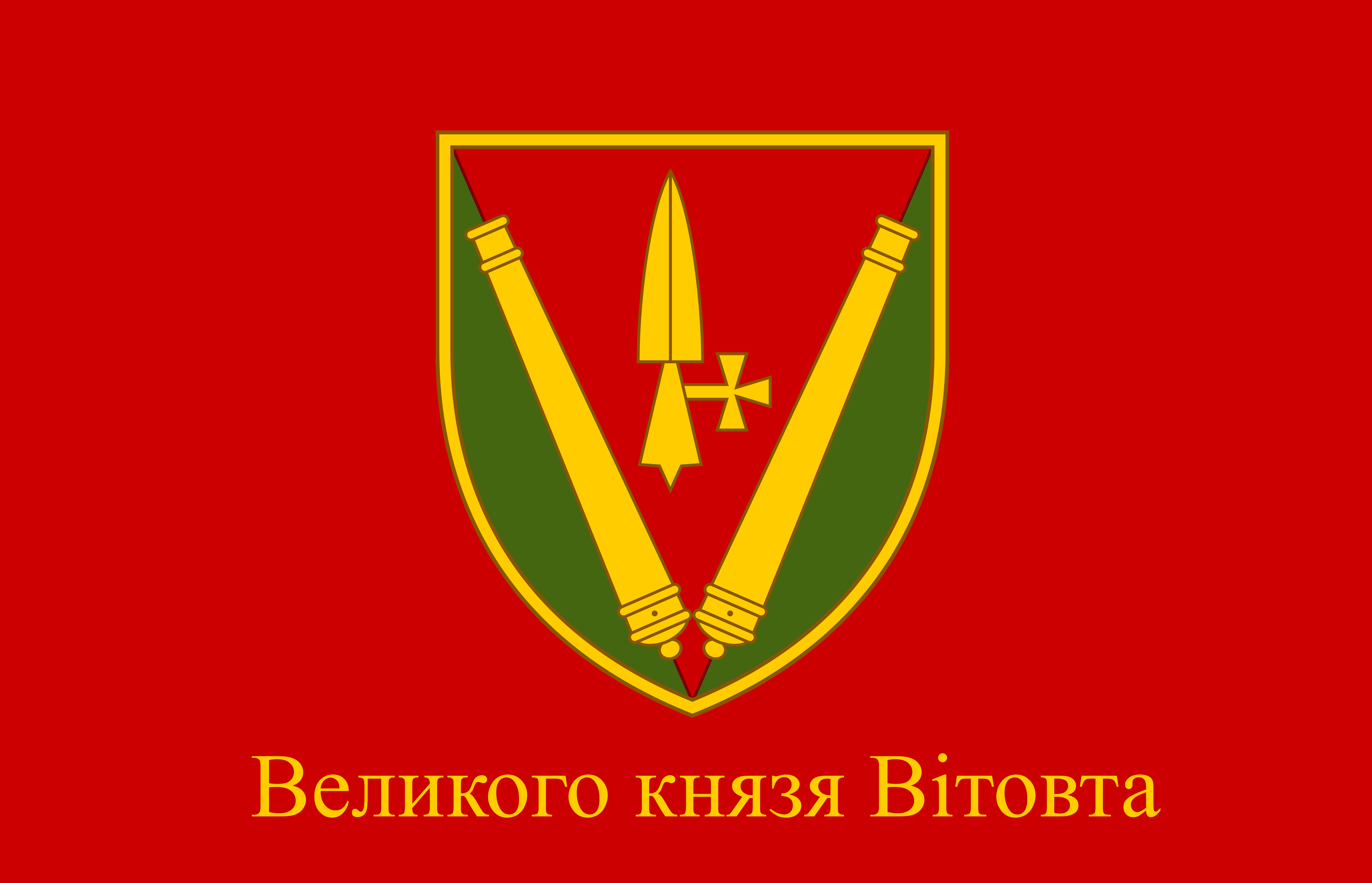
- Flag

The 40th Artillery Brigade (Ukrainian: 40 окрема артилерійська бригада імені Великого князя Вітовта, lit. '40th Separate Artillery Brigade named after Grand Duke Vytautas') is an artillery formation of the Ukrainian Ground Forces, based in Pervomaisk. The unit was activated on 25 May 2015, during the Russo-Ukrainian war.

== Etymology ==
On 23 August 2020, the Brigade was awarded the honorific "Grand Duke Vytautas".

== History ==
=== Russo-Ukrainian War ===
During the Russian invasion of Ukraine, the brigade was rendered the recently established honorary award of "For Courage and Bravery" by Ukrainian president Volodymyr Zelenskyy for its service in defense of Kharkiv.

== Structure ==
As of 2024, the brigade's structure is as follows:

- 40th Artillery Brigade, Pervomaisk
  - Headquarters & Headquarters Battery
  - 1st Artillery Battalion (2A36 Hyacinth-B)
  - 2nd Artillery Battalion (2A36 Hyacinth-B)
  - 3rd Artillery Battalion (2A65 Msta-B)
  - 4th Artillery Battalion (2A65 Msta-B)
  - Anti-tank Artillery Battalion (MT-12 Rapira)
  - Artillery Reconnaissance Battalion
  - UAV Comanche Group
  - Engineer Company
  - Logistic Company
  - Maintenance Company
  - Signal Company
  - Radar Company
  - Medical Company
  - CBRN-defense Company
