= 49th Artillery Brigade (Ukraine) =

Brigade of the Ukrainian Ground Forces

- 49-ма окрема артилерійська бригада
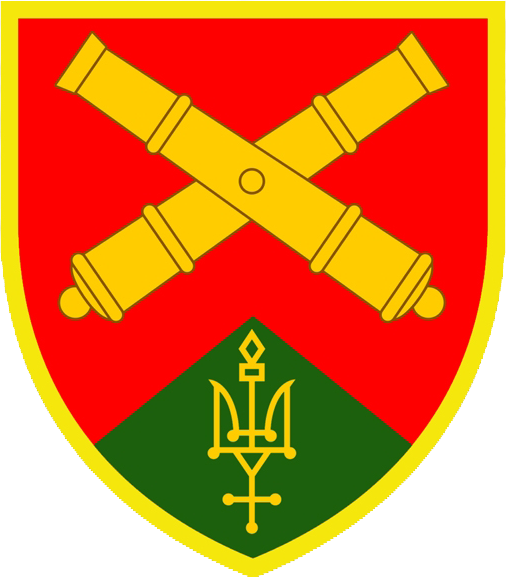
- Brigade insignia
- Founded: 2023 – present
- Country: Ukraine
- Allegiance: Ministry of Defence
- Branch: Ukrainian Ground Forces
- Type: Rocket and Artillery Forces
- Role: Artillery
- Size: Brigade
- Garrison/HQ: Chernihiv
- Engagements: Russo-Ukrainian War; Russian invasion of Ukraine

Commanders
- Current commander: Lt. Col. Evgen Sviten

The 49th Artillery Brigade "Mstislav the Brave" (MUN A0157) is a brigade level military unit of the Ukrainian Ground Forces, operationally subordinated to the Operational Command North. The Brigade was established in spring of 2023 and is based in Chernihiv.

== History ==
It was originally established in spring 2023. In April 2023, the brigade was equipped with Turkish made TRG-230 MBRLs armed with laser guided missiles. In August 2024, the brigade armed with AS-90s and other howitzers, was deployed near Sumy, around 30 miles from Kursk front to aid in the 2024 Kursk offensive. In summer 2023, teg brigade was de facto disbanded and was reorganized as the artillery groups of 116th, 117th and 118th Mechanized Brigade on its basis however in 2024, the brigade was reactivated and armed with 2S22 Bohdana howitzers.

The arsenal of the brigade also includes Turkish KHAN missiles.

== Equipment ==
Model	Image	Origin	Type	Number	Details
Artillery
152 mm howitzer 2A65 Msta-B		Soviet Union	152.4 mm howitzer artillery	3+	
2S22 Bohdana		Ukraine	155 mm self-propelled howitzer	2+	
TRG-230		Turkey	Rocket artillery	1+	
AS-90		United Kingdom	155 mm self-propelled howitzer	30+	

== Structure ==
The structure of the brigade is as follows:

- Management and Headquarters
- 1st Artillery Battalion
- 2nd Artillery Battalion
- 3rd Artillery Battalion
- Artillery Reconnaissance Battalion
- Engineering Company
- Maintenance Company
- Logistical support Company
- Signal Company
- Radar Company
- Medical Company
- CBRN Protection Company
- Commandant Platoon

== Commanders ==
- Lt. Col. Evgen Sviten (2023-)
