= 48th Artillery Brigade =

- 48-ма окрема артилерійська бригада
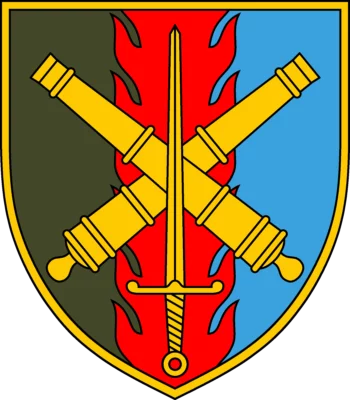
- Brigade insignia
- Founded: 2023
- Country: Ukraine
- Allegiance: Ministry of Defence
- Branch: Ukrainian Ground Forces
- Type: Rocket and Artillery Forces
- Role: Artillery
- Part of: 10th Army Corps
- Garrison/HQ: Poltava
- Patron: Hryhoriy Chyzhevskyi
- Engagements: Russo-Ukrainian War; Russian invasion of Ukraine

The 48th Artillery Brigade is a brigade level military unit of the Ukrainian Ground Forces, a part of the 10th Strategic Reserve Corps and operationally subordinated to the Operational Command North. The Brigade was established in October 2023 and is based in Poltava.

== History ==
It was established in 2023 during the Russian invasion of Ukraine and was amongst the first units to be equipped with 2S22 Bohdana incorporating both Tatra T-815-based vehicles and new armored models while also utilizing Soviet 2S7 Pion and German Panzerhaubitze 2000. Till February 2025, Bohdana fired more than 3,000 shots, while others had fired more than 2,000 shots. Conscripts are also enrolled into the brigade.

Once a Bohdana of the brigade was attacked by 5+ Russian kamikaze drones but it only suffered minor damage and the crew was only concussed, another Bohdana was once targeted with artillery strikes, but suffered only minor shrapnel damage and once a Bohdana was struck directly with shrapnel and caught fire, the vehicle was destroyed but the artillery piece was salvaged.

It took part in combat operations in Donetsk Oblast where it was tasked with striking targets 30 kilometers away, mostly armored vehicles, artillery systems, ammunition depots, observation posts and fortifications. In December 2024, it was operating to halt the Velyka Novosilka offensive near the administrative border between Zaporizhzhia Oblast and Dnipropetrovsk Oblast so as to prevent a Russian entry into the latter by bogging down Russian forces by striking personnel at pickup and drop-off as well as by destroying Russian armored vehicles. The brigade also reported severing of communication lines at this front by Russian forces. In January 2025, the brigade reported massive casualties amongst Russian forces stating that Russian assault Forces had to "step over the bodies of dead Russian soldiers".

On 6 December 2025 President Volodymyr Zelenskyy awarded the brigade the honorary name of colonel of the Army of the Ukrainian People's Republic Hryhoriy Chyzhevskyi.

== Equipment ==
Model	Image	Origin	Type	Number	Details
Artillery
152 mm howitzer 2A65 Msta-B		Soviet Union	152.4 mm howitzer artillery		
2A36 Giatsint-B		Soviet Union	152mm Field gun		
MT-12 Rapira		Soviet Union	100-mm anti-tank gun		
2S7 Pion		Soviet Union	Self-propelled 203 mm cannon		
BM-27 Uragan		Soviet Union	self-propelled 220 mm multiple rocket launcher		
Panzerhaubitze 2000		Germany	155 mm self-propelled howitzer		
2S22 Bohdana		Ukraine	155 mm self-propelled howitzer	7+	
Transport vehicles
Volkswagen Transporter (T4)		Germany	Light commercial vehicle		
Unmanned Aerial Vehicle
Ukrspecsystems Shark		Ukraine	Air reconnaissance		

== Structure ==
The structure of the brigade is as follows:

- Management and Headquarters
- 1st Artillery Battalion
- 2nd Artillery Battalion
- 3rd Artillery Battalion
- Artillery Reconnaissance Battalion
- Engineering Company
- Maintenance Company
- Logistical support Company
- Signal Company
- Radar Company
- Medical Company
- CBRN Protection Company
- Commandant Platoon
