= 55th Artillery Brigade (Ukraine) =

Ukrainian Ground Forces unit

- 55-та артилерійська бригада
- Active: 1972–present
- Country: Ukraine (1992–present); Soviet Union (1972–1991)
- Allegiance: Armed Forces of Ukraine
- Branch: Ukrainian Ground Forces
- Type: Brigade
- Role: Rocket and Artillery Forces
- Part of: Operational Command East: 9th Army Corps
- Garrison/HQ: Zaporizhzhia, Zaporizhzhia Oblast
- Motto: We don’t argue – we put a full stop
- Engagements: Russo-Ukrainian War: War in Donbas; Fights on the Ukrainian–Russian border (2014); Battle of Ilovaisk; Second Battle of Donetsk Airport; Battle of Mariupol (September 2014); Battle of Avdiivka (2017); Full scale invasion; Pokrovsk offensive
- Decorations: For Courage and Bravery
- Website: Official Facebook page

Commanders
- Current commander: Colonel Roman Kachur

The 55th Separate Artillery Brigade Zaporozhian Sich (Ukrainian: 55-та окрема артилерійська бригада Запорізька Січ), is a Brigade of the Ukrainian Ground Forces.

== History ==
The personnel of the 55th Artillery Division took the oath of allegiance to the people of Ukraine on 19th January 1992. The Division was reorganized into the 2nd Tactical Artillery Group, and in October 2005 the Group and the 20th Artillery Regiment were reorganized into the 55th Separate Artillery Brigade.

=== Russo-Ukrainian War ===
The Unit has been participating in the war since 2014.

The Brigade is one of the five recipients of the For Courage and Bravery Award of the President of Ukraine which it received during the independence day parade on 24th August 2015.

In 2018, the brigade was awarded the honorific title Zaporozhian Sich.

During the full-scale invasion the brigade took part in the Pokrovsk offensive.

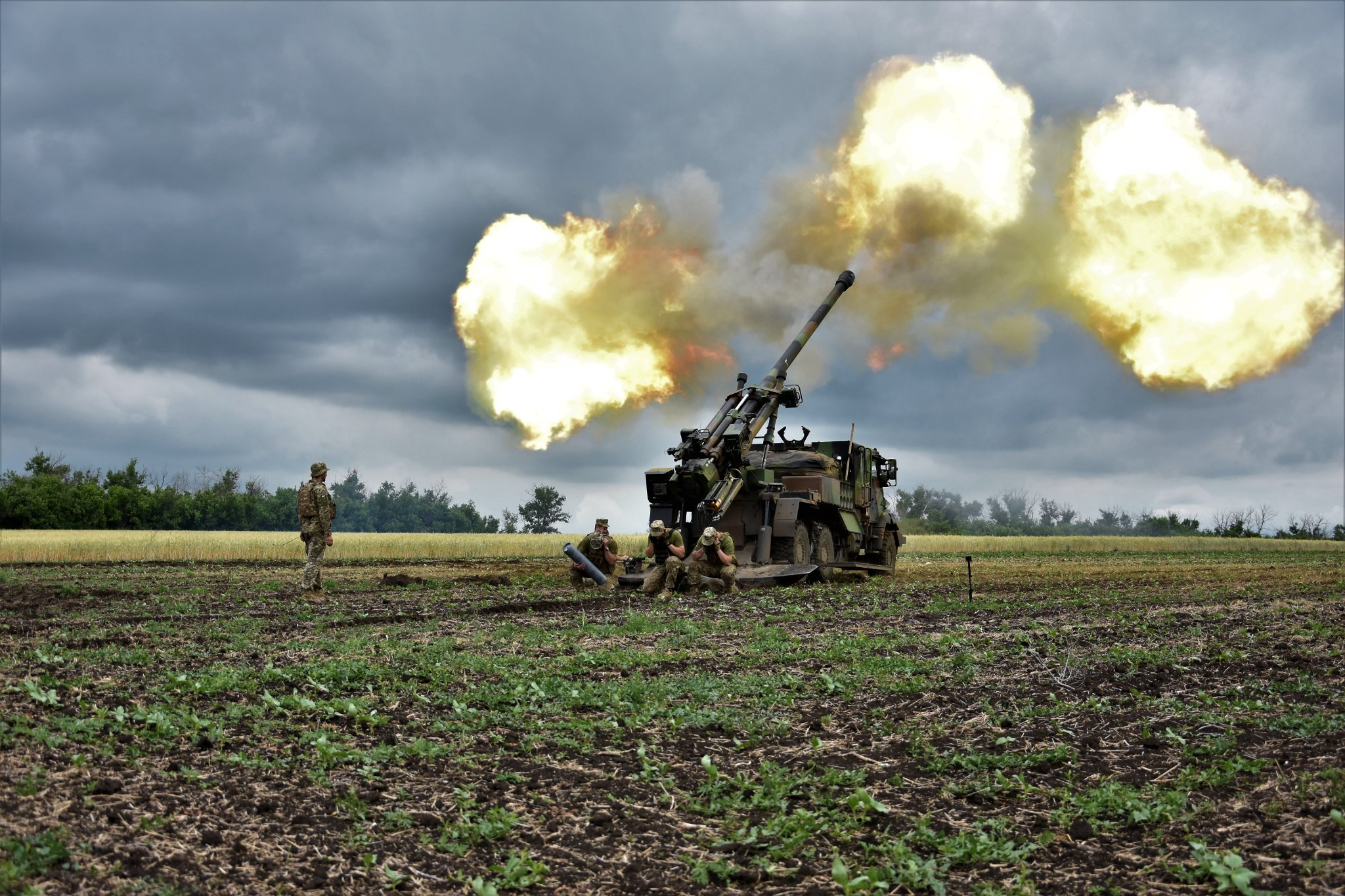
French CAESAR self-propelled howitzer of 55th Artillery Brigade, 2022.

== Structure ==
The brigade operates a squadron consisting of six batteries, each with three units, of CAESAR self-propelled howitzers donated by France following Russia's invasion of Ukraine in 2022.

- 55th Artillery Brigade
  - Headquarter
  - 1st Artillery Battalion
  - 2nd Artillery Battalion
  - 3rd Artillery Battalion
  - 4th Artillery Battalion
  - Anti-tank Artillery Battalion
  - Artillery Reconnaissance Battalion
  - Engineer Company
  - Maintenance Company
  - Logistic Company
  - Signal Company
  - Radar Company
  - Medical Company
  - CBRN Protection Company

== Equipment ==
The brigade mainly operates self-propelled and towed howitzers. Besides tube artillery it also operates the rocket artillery system RM-70 and various Anti-tank guided missiles, including Shturm-S in 2014.

| Type | Image | Origin | Role | Number | Note |
Self-propelled artillery
| CAESAR | | France | Wheeled howitzer | ? | Provided by France and Denmark. In service since April–May 2022 |
| 2S22 Bohdana | | Ukraine | Wheeled howitzer | ? | |
Rocket Artillery
| RM-70 Vampire | | Czechia | MLRS | ? | Provided by Czechia. In service since April–May 2022 |
Towed Artillery
| M777 | | USA | Howitzer | ? | Provided by the US, Canada and Australia. In service since April 2022 |
| 2A65 Msta-B | | Sovjet Union | Howitzer | ? | |
| 2A36 Giatsint-B | | Sovjet Union | Field gun | ? | |
| D-20 | | Sovjet Union | Howitzer | ? | |
| MT-12 | | Sovjet Union | Anti-Tank gun | ? | |

== Commanders ==
- Colonel Borys Lorman (2005–2007)
- Colonel Yevhen Zamotayev (2007–2010)
- Colonel Brusov Evgenievich (2010–2018)
- Colonel Roman Kachur (2018–2025)
