= Roman Kachur =

Ukrainian military officer (born 1984)

- Роман Качур
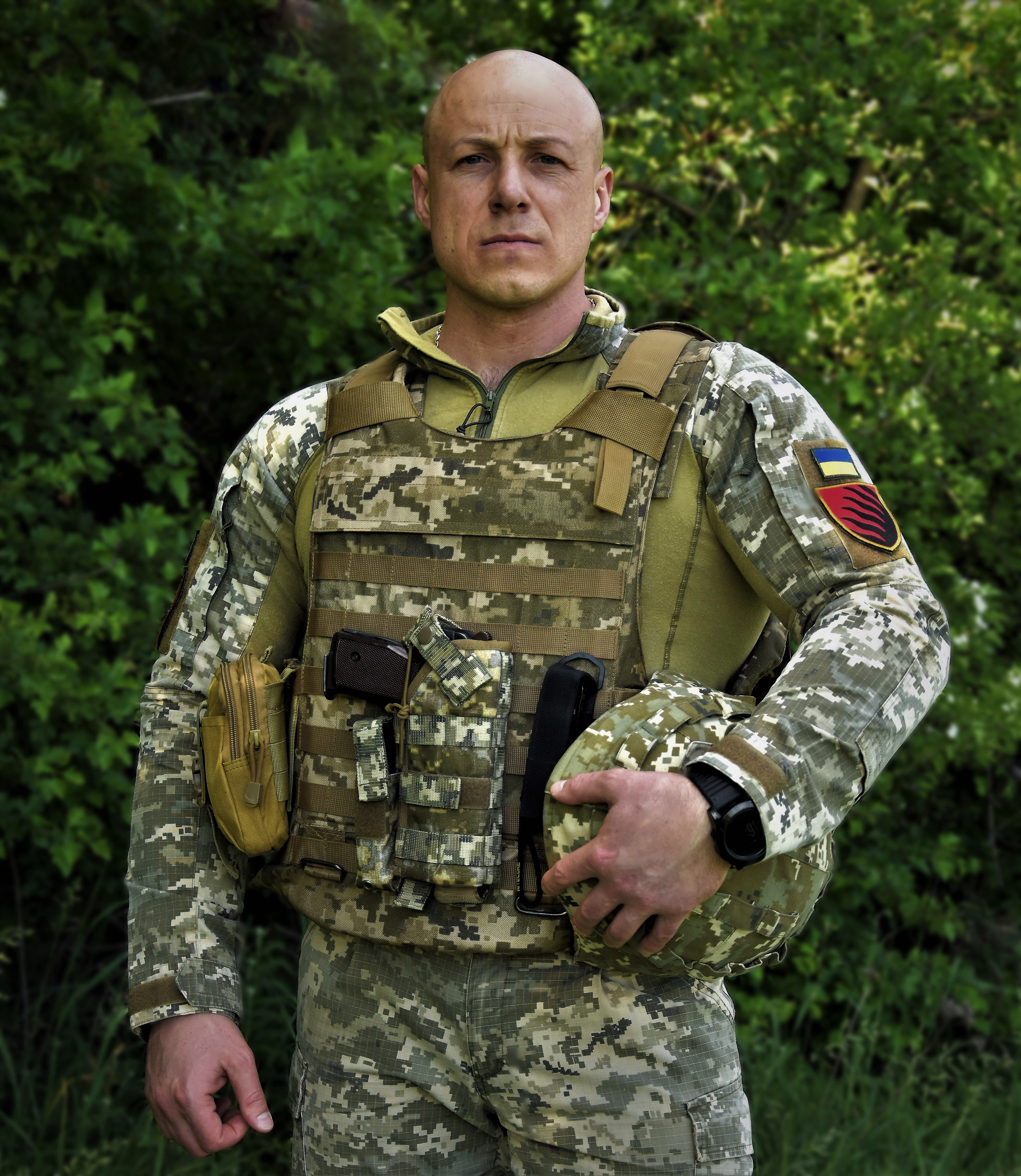

Personal details
- Born: September 25, 1984 (age 41) Sumy, Ukrainian SSR
- Education: Military Institute of Missile Forces and Artillery (Sumy)

Military service
- Allegiance: Ukraine
- Branch/service: Ukrainian Ground Forces; Rocket Forces and Artillery; Operational Command East; 55th Artillery Brigade (2018—2025); Ground Forces Academy (since 2025)
- Battles/wars: Russo-Ukrainian War; War in Donbas; 2022 Russian invasion of Ukraine
- Awards: Hero of Ukraine

Roman Volodymyrovych Kachur (born September 25, 1984, Sumy) is a Ukrainian military officer, colonel of the Armed Forces of Ukraine, and participant in the Russian-Ukrainian War.

== Biography ==
Roman Kachur was born in Sumy. In 2005, he graduated from the Sumy Military Institute of Missile Forces and Artillery.

In 2014–2018 he served as the chief of artillery of the 81st Airmobile Brigade of the Armed Forces of Ukraine. Since March 2018, he has been the commander of the 55th Artillery Brigade "Zaporizhzhia Sich".

In early 2025 he was chosen to be the head of the Hetman Petro Sahaidachnyi National Ground Forces Academy.

== Awards ==
He was awarded the Hero of Ukraine on May 12, 2022.

He is a Knight of the Order of Bohdan Khmelnytskyi of all three degrees.
