= 151st Reconnaissance Strike Battalion (Ukraine) =

- 151-й Окремий розвідувально-ударний батальйон
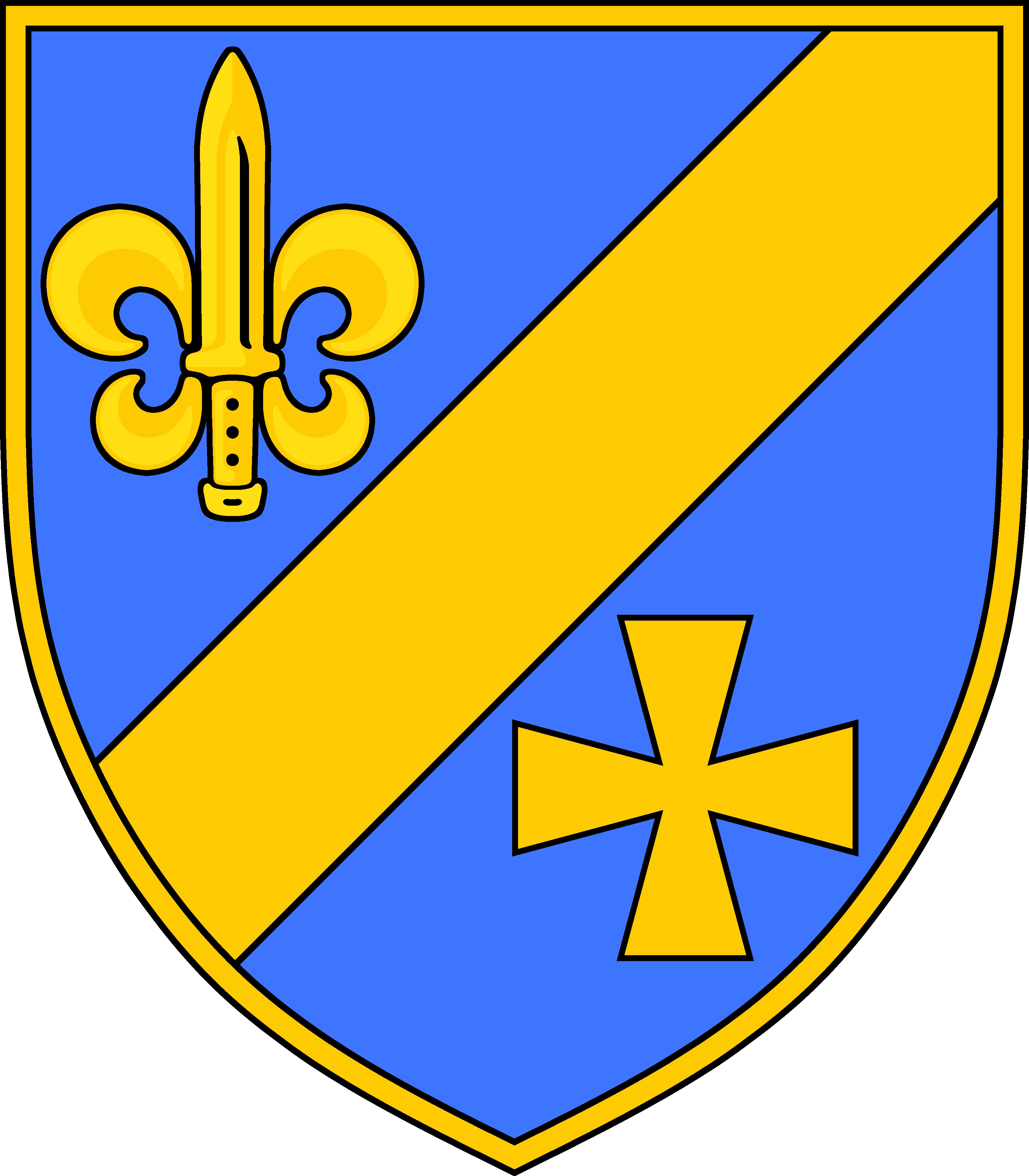
- Battalion's insignia
- Founded: 2023
- Country: Ukraine
- Allegiance: Armed Forces of Ukraine
- Branch: Ukrainian Ground Forces
- Type: Battalion, spetsnaz
- Role: Reconnaissance, counteroffensive and sabotage
- Engagements: Russo-Ukrainian War; 2022 Russian invasion of Ukraine

The 151st Separate Reconnaissance Strike Battalion (MUN A4759) is a battalion of the Ukrainian ground forces acting as an independent unit, subordinated to the 10th Army Corps. It has seen combat during the Russo-Ukrainian war, initially as a Company and has been performing reconnaissance, drone strikes and other combat operations throughout the entire front. It was established in 2023.

== History ==
It recruits foreigners in its ranks. On 6 September 2023, a soldier of the battalion (Zakaluzhny Mykola Mykolaovych) was killed in Robotyne during the 2023 Ukrainian counteroffensive.

It took part in the Battle of Kupiansk. On 3 August 2024, a soldier of the battalion (Baboshko Danylo Kostantynovych) was killed in Kupiansk. On 2 September 2024, a soldier of the battalion (Monchuk Bohdan Anatoliovych) was killed in Novosadove. On 5 September 2024, a soldier of the battalion (Pitovka Mykhailo Mykhailovych) was killed in Kupiansk. In October 2024, it received new map plotting equipment.

On 2 February 2025, a soldier of the battalion (Bondarenko Serhi Oleksandrovych) was killed in Zapadne. In October 2025, it was still performing combat operations in Kupiansk, conducting ground reconnaissance and sabotage operations, implementing new strategies and incorporating new equipment and technologies.

== Equipment ==
- DJI Mavic
- Leleka-100
- ACS-3
