= 2P22 Bohdana =

Ukrainian 155 mm towed howitzer

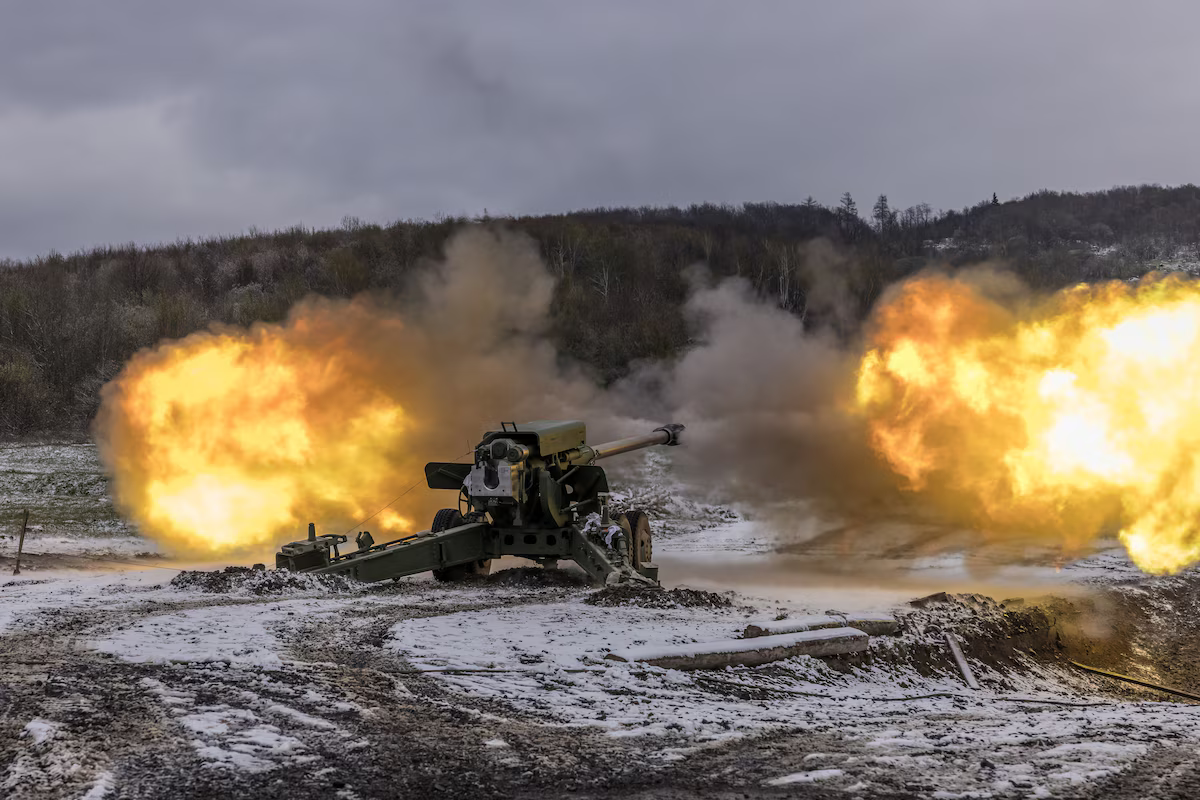
- 2P22 Bohdana-BG during acceptance trials
- Type: towed howitzer
- Place of origin: Ukraine

Service history
- In service: 2025–present
- Used by: Ukrainian Ground Forces
- Wars: Russo-Ukrainian War

Production history
- Designer: Kramatorsk Heavy Duty Machine Tool Plant
- Designed: 2023–present
- Unit cost: US$1.5 million
- Produced: 2024–present
- No. built: 100+
- Variants: See variants

Specifications
- Mass: 10 tons
- Maximum firing range: 42–60 km (26–37 mi)
- Main armament: 155 mm (6.1 in) howitzer

The 2P22 Bohdana is a 155 mm NATO-standard caliber, towed howitzer developed in Ukraine. The first piece entered service with the 47th Artillery Brigade in early 2025.

== History ==
In late 2023, it was revealed that a towed version of the 2S22 Bohdana was being developed. Per the comments of Brigadier General Baranov, head of the Main Directorate of Rocket Forces and Artillery, this was being done as Ukraine produces more barrels than there are available chassis for them. In the fall of 2024, a prototype of a towed Bohdana was revealed during a visit of an international delegation. The first unit to operate the howitzer became the 47th Artillery Brigade.

=== Russo-Ukrainian War ===
In a report from April 2025, artillerymen of the 47th Artillery Brigade conducted live fire training a few days before deploying to the front line. Among self-propelled variants of the Bohdana, a towed variant was also employed.

== Production ==
The initial production variant, called Bohdana-BG, was mounted on the chassis of surplus Soviet 2A36 howitzers, which had become inoperable due to a deficit of Giatsint-specific 152mm shells and excessive barrel wear. A further variant, in development as of April 2025, is envisioned to be mounted on a new, domestic carriage. As of September 2025, it was reported more than 100 Bohdana-BGs have been produced.

== Variants ==
- 2P22 Bohdana-BG

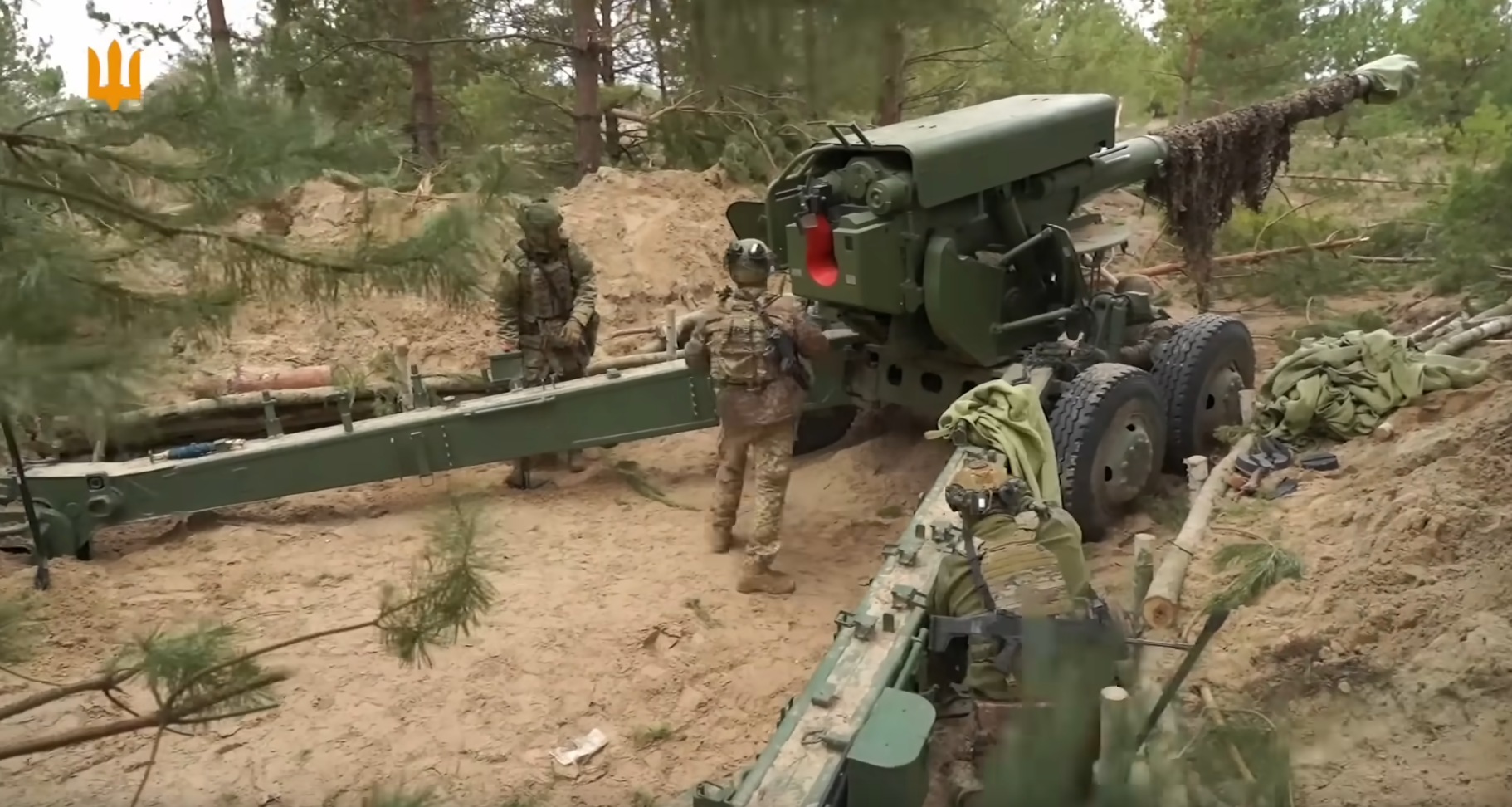
2P22 Bohdana-BG during firing drills

Initial production version mounted on the carriage of a 2A36 howitzer.

- Unnamed variant on a domestic carriage

In April 2025, a representative of the Kramatorsk Machine Tool Plant stated that a new variant of the 2P22 Bohdana, mounted on a new, domestic carriage, was in development.
