= 10th Army Corps (Ukraine) =

Ukrainian Ground Forces formation

- 10-й армійський корпус
- Insignia of the corps
- Active: 2023 – present
- Country: Ukraine
- Branch: Ukrainian Ground Forces
- Size: Corps
- Garrison/HQ: Poltava, Poltava Oblast
- Motto: "To Live is to Fight"
- Engagements: Russo-Ukrainian war (2022–present); 2023 Ukrainian counteroffensive; Pokrovsk offensive; Kupiansk offensive
- Website: Official Facebook page

Commanders
- Current commander: Brig. Gen. Artem Bohomolov

The 10th Army Corps (Ukrainian: 10-й армійський корпус) is a Corps of the Ukrainian Ground Forces.

== History ==
The 10th Army Corps of Ukraine was formed in 2023 as part of a reorganization of Ukraine's military. It groups mechanized, artillery, and other specialized brigades under its command. This restructuring was aimed at improving operational efficiency and aligning with NATO standards. It was reportedly created in preparation for the summer 2023 Ukrainian offensive in southern Ukraine.

In late July 2023, during a Ukrainian offensive, the 10th Army Corps was rotated into combat and was conducting armored assaults towards the main Russian defensive line in the Zaporizhzhia region. The 10th Army Corps was considered the Ukrainian reserve or "second echelon" following the first phase of mostly unsuccessful attacks by the 9th Army Corps in June.

By early 2025, Ukraine had begun implementing reforms to transition from a brigade-based system to a corps-level structure, with the 10th Army Corps being part of this effort.

On 24 April 2026, the corps commander was removed from his post and demoted following reports on social media that described regular food and water shortages at the 14th Mechanized Brigade's positions. Brigadier General Artem Bohomolov was appointed new commander.

== Structure ==
As of 2025 the corps structure is as follows:

- 10th Army Corps
  - Corps Headquarters
    - 82nd Command Battalion
  - 1st Medical Battalion
  - 12th Heavy Mechanized Brigade
  - 14th Mechanized Brigade
  - 43rd Mechanized Brigade
  - 48th Artillery Brigade
  - 82nd Signals Battalion
  - 94th Combat Engineering Battalion
  - 115th Mechanized Brigade
  - 116th Mechanized Brigade
  - 117th Heavy Mechanized Brigade
  - 151st Reconnaissance Strike Battalion
  - 183rd Reserve Battalion
  - 229th Logistics Battalion
  - 430th Unmanned Systems Battalion
  - 509th Maintenance and Recovery Battalion
  - 582nd Security and Support Battalion
