= Podlet-1K Radar =

Russian air defense radar system

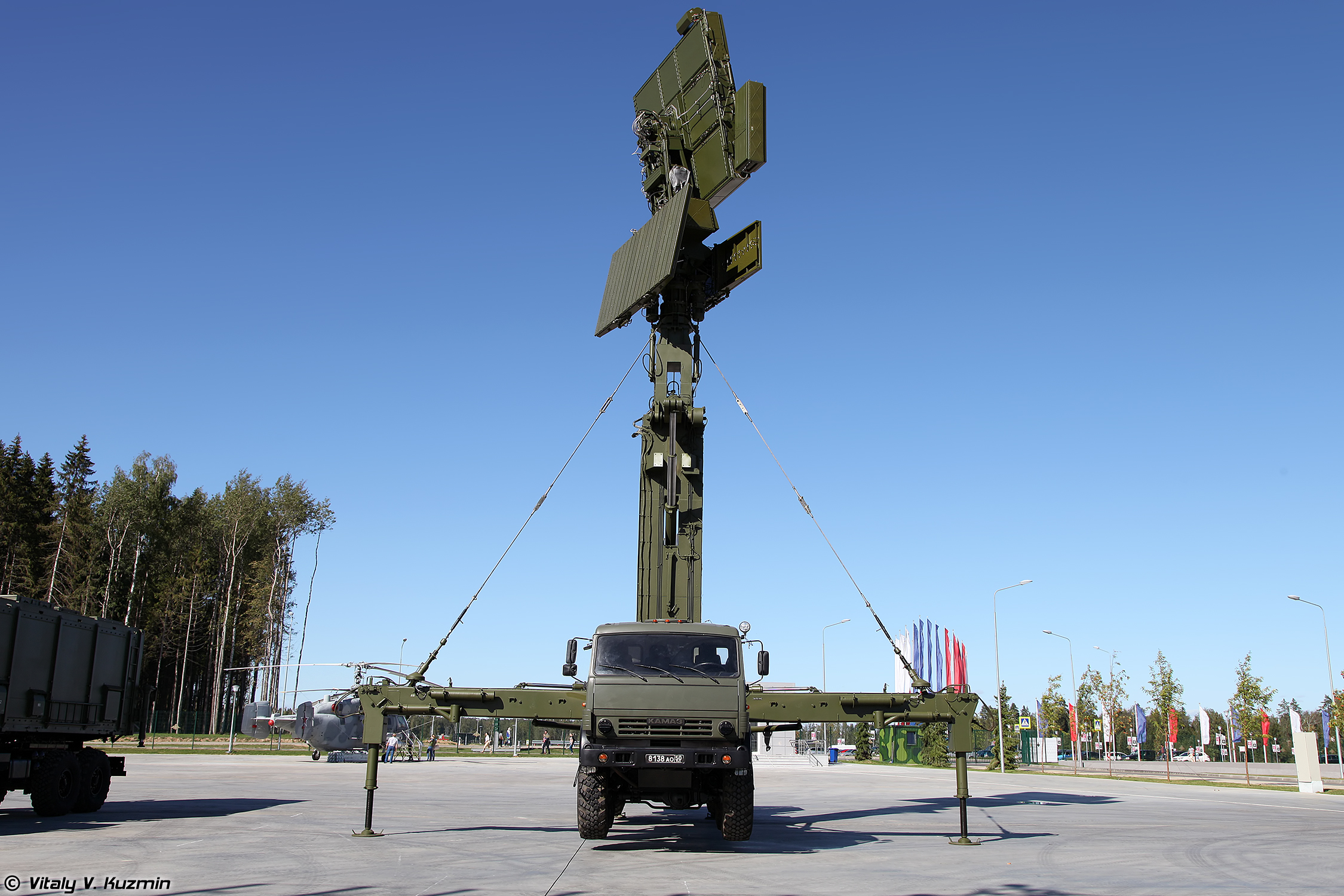
Podlet-1K Radar

Podlet-1K Radar, also known as 48Ya6-K1, is an advanced Russian air defense radar system. It was developed by Almaz-Antey Corporation for the Russian Air Force to provide support for the S-300, S-400 systems.

== Combat history ==
The system has been deployed in the Russian invasion of Ukraine. One such system deployed in Syria was captured by Syrian rebels in December 2024. During the Russian Invasion of Ukraine, 7 systems have been confirmed as damaged or destroyed according to Oryx as of April 2026.

== Gallery ==
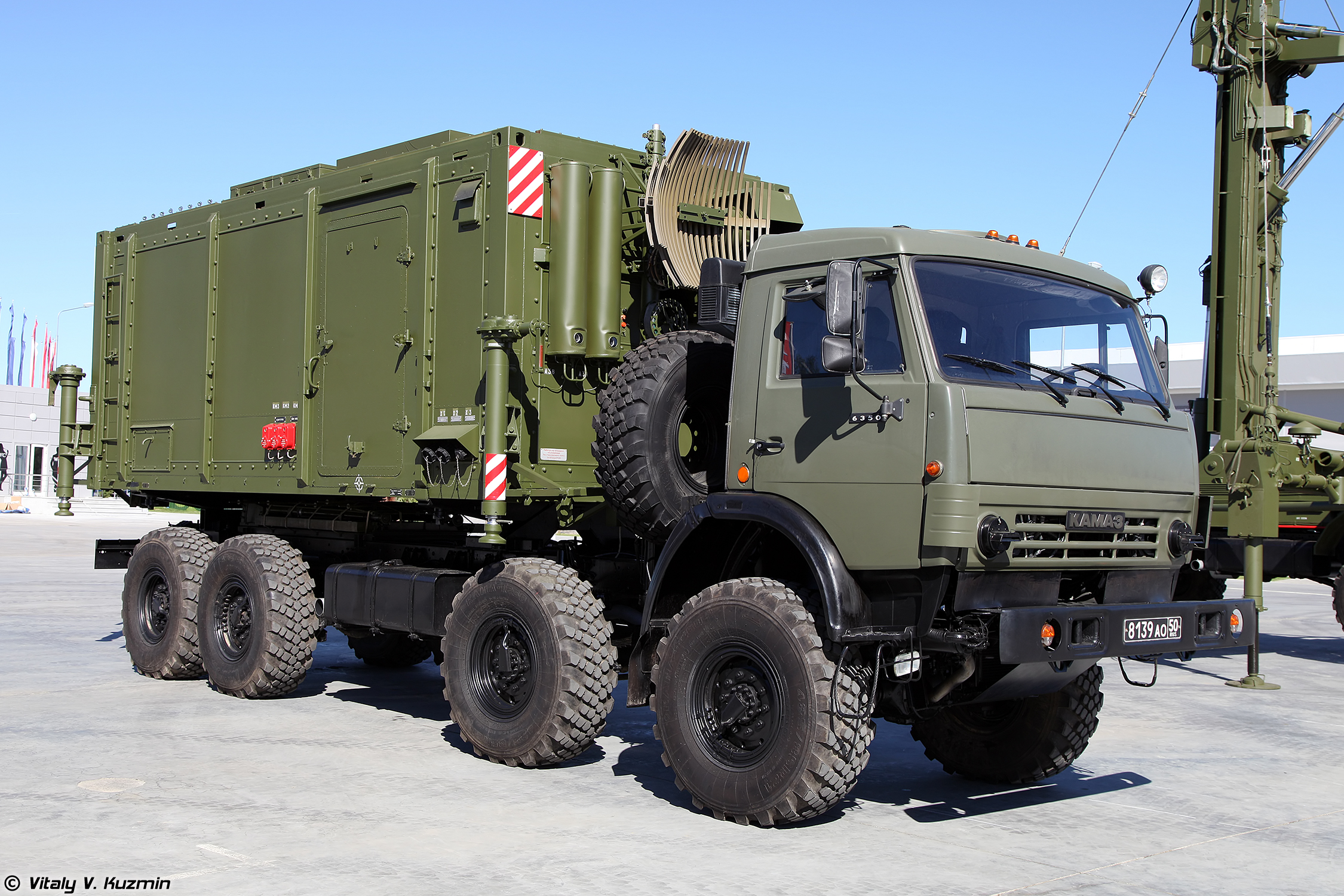
