= 43rd Mechanized Brigade (Ukraine) =

Ukrainian Ground Forces unit

- 43 окрема механізована бригада
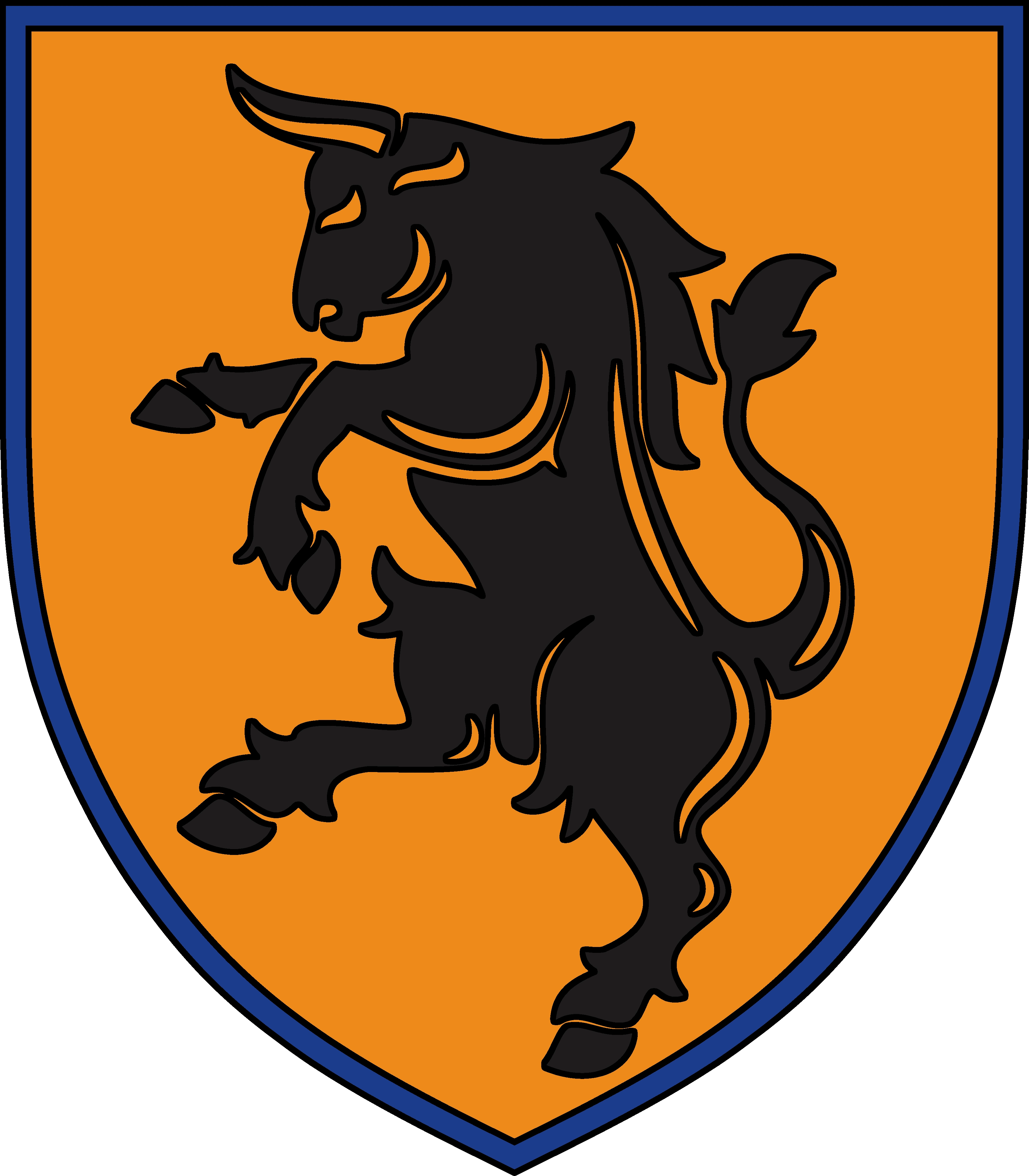
- Shoulder sleeve insignia
- Active: March 1, 2023 – present
- Country: Ukraine
- Branch: Ukrainian Ground Forces
- Role: Mechanized Infantry
- Part of: 10th Army Corps
- Engagements: Russo-Ukrainian War: Russian invasion of Ukraine; 2023 Ukrainian counteroffensive; Kupiansk front
- Website: https://www.facebook.com/profile.php?id=100092925724373

The 43rd Mechanized Brigade (Ukrainian: 43 окрема механізована бригада) is a brigade of the Ukrainian Ground Forces. It was formed in 2023 from a mechanized battalion of the 93rd Mechanized Brigade.

== History ==
As of April 2023, the brigade was in the process of formation. The brigade has also notably been providing humanitarian aid to Ukrainian civilians.

The brigade was involved in the 2023 Ukrainian counteroffensive.

=== Operations in Kharkiv Oblast (2024–present) ===
In June 2024 it was reported that the brigade was positioned in the Kharkiv Oblast, and the next month it was reported that it was operating on the Kupiansk front.

Starting on 10 October 2022, units of the 43rd Brigade took part in a battle with Russian forces within the village of Kruhliakivka. After fifty days of combat, the units withdrew to the neighboring village of Zahryzove in early December.

During January and February 2025, the brigade remained positioned on the Kupiansk front in Kharkiv Oblast.

In April 2025, it was reported that units of the brigade, including its drone battalion "Nebesna Mara", were still fighting on the Kupiansk front in the Kharkiv Oblast. As of May 2025, the brigade remains on the Kupiansk front.

== Structure ==
As of 2024, the brigade's structure is as follows:

- 43rd Mechanized Brigade
  - Headquarters & Headquarters Company
  - 1st Mechanized Battalion
  - 2nd Mechanized Battalion
  - 3rd Mechanized Battalion
  - 413th Separate Rifle Battalion
  - Tank Battalion
  - Attack Drone Company "Heavenly Mara"
  - Attack Drone Company "Korax"
  - Artillery Group
    - Control and Target Acquisition Battery
    - 1st Self-propelled Artillery Division (2S1 Gvozdika)
    - 2nd Self-propelled Artillery Division (2S1 Gvozdika)
    - 3rd Multiple Rocket Launcher Battery (BM-21 Grad)
    - Anti-tank Company
  - Anti-Aircraft Defense Battalion
  - Reconnaissance Company
    - Sky Ghost Drone Unit
  - Engineer Battalion
  - Logistic Battalion
  - Signal Company
  - Maintenance Battalion
  - Radar Company
  - Medical Company
  - Chemical, Biological, Radiological and Nuclear Defense Company
