= 107th Rocket Artillery Brigade (Ukraine) =

107th Rocket Artillery Brigade 107th Rocket Artillery Regiment (2005–2019) 107th Rocket Brigade (1967–2005) 67th Howitzer Artillery Brigade(1942–1967)
- Active: 16 December 1942
- Country: Soviet Union (1942–1991); Ukraine (1992–present)
- Allegiance: Armed Forces of Ukraine
- Branch: Ukrainian Ground Forces
- Type: Rocket and Artillery Forces
- Role: Artillery
- Size: Brigade
- Part of: Operational Command East
- Garrison/HQ: Kremenchuk
- Nickname: Kremenchuk brigade
- Mottos: Strength and Honor
- Engagements: Russo-Ukrainian War: Full scale invasion; 2023 Ukrainian Counteroffensive
- Decorations: For Courage and Bravery
- Website: 107reabr.mil.gov.ua

Insignia
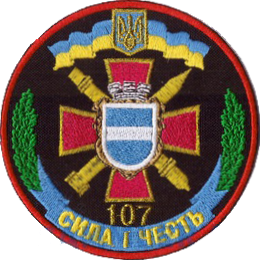
- Old insignia

The 107th Rocket Artillery Brigade Kremenchuk is a rocket-launcher brigade of the Ukrainian Ground Forces, stationed at Kremenchuk. It was formed from a reorganisation of the previous 107th Rocket Artillery Regiment which itself was formed out of the 107th Rocket Brigade. It is now part of Operational Command East.

== History ==
The brigade traces its lineage back to the Red Army's 67th Howitzer Artillery Brigade, formed on 16 December 1942 near Moscow. In May 1943 it had completed training and was armed with the 122 mm howitzer M1938 (M-30). The brigade fought near Leningrad and in Ukraine, Moldova, Romania, and Hungary. The brigade finished the war in Austria. During the war, the brigade received seventeen thanks from Stalin. The brigade received the honorific "Leningrad" and was awarded the Order of Kutuzov 2nd class.

Postwar, the brigade was based in Ukraine and Hungary. The brigade was successively based in Dnipropetrovsk, Bila Tserkva, and Kiev. It later moved to Kremenchuk.

The 107th Rocket Brigade was activated in October 1967 in Kremenchuk with the 6th Guards Tank Army. It was equipped with R-11 Zemlya and R-17 Elbrus tactical ballistic missiles. It included the 661st and two other separate missile battalions, as well as a technical battery. During the 1980s, it was co-located with a mobilization rocket brigade. In January 1992, it was taken over by Ukraine.

The brigade received the Tochka-U in 2003. In 2005, the brigade became a regiment and was reequipped with the 9K58 Smerch. In 2008, the regiment was awarded the honorific "Kremenchuk".

On 18 November 2015, the regiment's "Leningrad Order of Kutuzov" honorifics were removed as part of a Ukrainian Armed Forces-wide removal of Soviet awards and decorations. On January 1, 2019, the regiment was reorganised as a brigade.

=== Russo-Ukrainian War ===
During the 2023 Ukrainian Counteroffensive the brigade has been involved in Southern campaign in the Zaporizhzhia direction.

On 6 December 2024 the unit was awarded the honorary award For Courage and Bravery by the President of Ukraine Volodymyr Zelenskyy.

== Structure ==
As of 2026 the brigade's structure is as follows:

- 107th Rocket Artillery Brigade
  - Brigade Headquarters and HQ Battery
  - Target Acqusition Battery
  - 1st MLRS Field Artillery Division
  - 3rd MLRS Field Artillery Division
  - 2nd MLRS Field Artillery Division
  - 4th MLRS Field Artillery Division
  - Artillery Reconnaissance Battalion
  - Maintenance Company
  - Signal Company
  - Medical Company
  - Engineer Company
  - Logistic Company
  - Radar Company
  - CBRN-defense Protection Company
  - Brigade Military Band

== Equipment ==
Due to the acute shortage of ammunition for the old Soviet systems, the 107th Rocket Artillery Brigade is one of the few remaining in Ukraine. Alongside the dwindling number of Soviet systems, Ukrainian-made or further developed systems such as the Vilkha or Western M270 multiple rocket launcher systems are increasingly being used.

Type	Image	Origin	Role	Number	Note
Rocket Artillery
Vilkha		Ukraine	MLRS	?	Ukrainian enhancement of the BM-30 system
BM-30 Smerch		Sovjet Union	MLRS	?	
M270 MARS II LRU		USA	MLRS	?	Delivered from 2022 onwards by France, Germany, the United Kingdom, Italy and Norway
