= TRG-230 =

- Type: Rocket artillery
- Place of origin: Turkey

Production history
- Manufacturer: Roketsan
- Variants: See Variants

Specifications
- Caliber: 230 mm (9.1 in)
- Barrels: 6/12
- Effective firing range: TRG-230: 20–70 km (12–43 mi); TRG-230-İHA: 20–150 km (12–93 mi)
- Warhead: High explosives + steel ball
- Warhead weight: 42 kg
- Detonation mechanism: Point detonating and proximity
- Blast yield: ≥ 55 m
- Propellant: Composite solid
- Guidance system: TRG-230: GPS + GLONASS aided INS; TRLG-230: GPS + GLONASS aided INS with laser seeker
- Accuracy: TRG-230: ≤ 10 m; TRLG-230: ≤ 2 m
- Launch platform: 6x6 or 8x8 tactical truck; TRG-230-İHA: Bayraktar Akıncı

TRG-230 is a family of guided missiles of 230-mm diameter designed and manufactured by Turkish company Roketsan. The original variants are surface-to-surface missiles, and an air-to-surface variant is being tested. TRG-230 missiles have a range of 20 km to 70 km and are launched from 230-mm rocket tubes. The TRLG-230 variant has laser guidance. The air-launched TRG-230-İHA has a range up to 150 km.

== Synopsis ==
The TRG-230 missile is designed to be used against high-priority targets within a range of 20–70 km. It can be launched from the Roketsan Multi-Barrel Rocket Launcher and other platforms with compatible interfaces.

== Variants ==
=== TRLG-230 ===
The TRLG-230 has an additional seeker for laser guidance. It can hit targets marked by UAVs and UCAVs. Its CEP is less than two meters.

=== TRG-230-İHA ===
The TRG-230-İHA is an air-to-surface version that is launched from an unmanned aerial vehicle (UAV; Turkish: İHA). After release from a UAV, it free-falls for a while, then autonomously ignites its solid propellant engine. It has an effective range of 20 to 150 kilometers, depending on the height and speed at which it is launched. Roketsan released a video on 16 December 2022 announcing that a Bayraktar Akıncı UCAV made the first test launch, hitting the target with precision from 100 kilometers away. The second test launch, from an Akıncı three months later, hit a target from 140 kilometers.

== Operators ==
Azerbaijan
Azerbaijani Land Forces: TRLG-230 and İHA-230 air-to-ground ballistic missile

Bangladesh
Bangladesh Army: TRG-230

Ukraine
Ukrainian Ground Forces: TRLG-230
