= 152 mm howitzer 2A65 Msta-B =

Soviet towed artillery

152 mm Howitzer 2A65
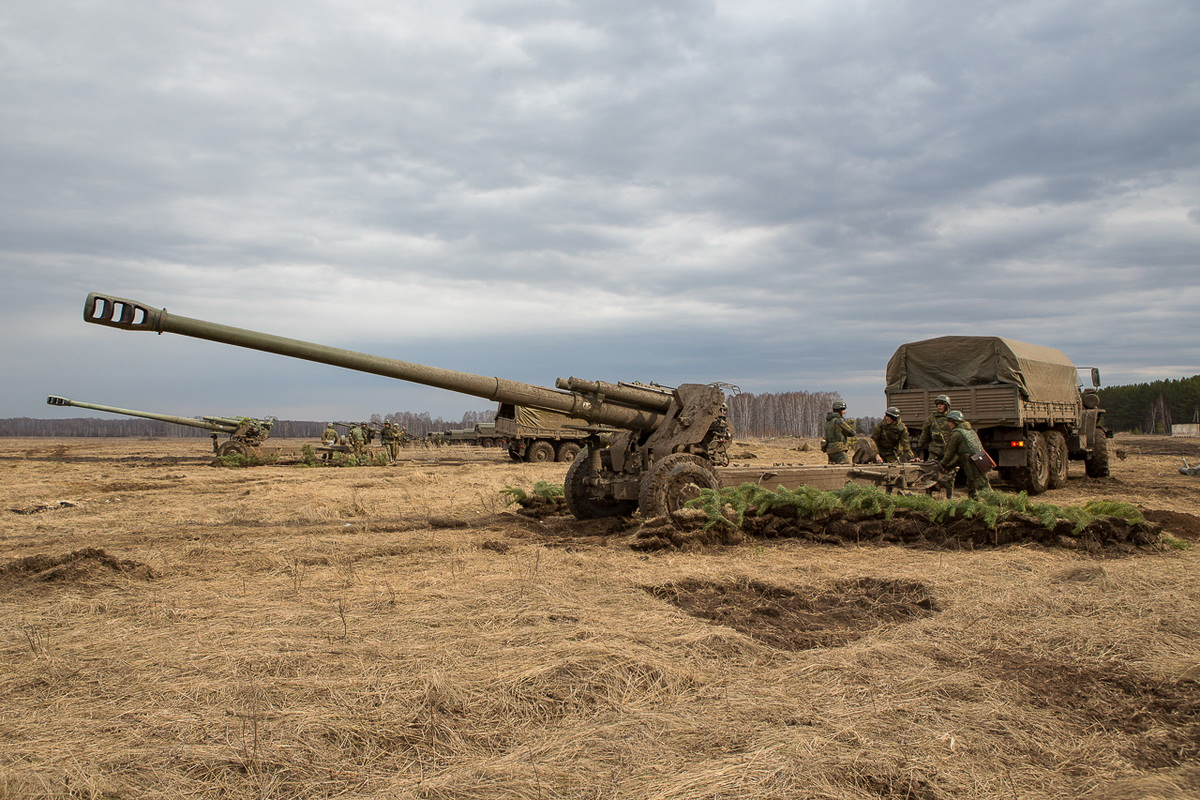
- 2A65 "Msta-B" artillery pieces of Russia's 90th Guards Tank Division.
- Type: Howitzer
- Place of origin: Soviet Union

Service history
- In service: 1987–present
- Used by: see Operators
- Wars: War in Donbas; Syrian civil war Russo-Ukrainian war

Production history
- Designer: Central Design Bureau Titan
- Designed: 1976–1986
- Manufacturer: Motovilikha Plants
- Produced: 1987–present
- Variants: see Variants

Specifications
- Mass: Combat: 6,800 kg (15,000 lb)
- Length: 12.7 m (41 ft 8 in)
- Barrel length: 7.2 m (23 ft 7 in) L/47; 8.13 m (26 ft 8 in) L/53.3 (with muzzle brake)
- Crew: 6–11
- Shell: OF45 (High explosive)
- Caliber: 152.4 mm (6.00 in)
- Carriage: Split trail
- Elevation: -3.5° to +70°
- Traverse: 28°
- Rate of fire: 5-6 rounds per minute
- Muzzle velocity: 828 m/s (2,720 ft/s)
- Maximum firing range: 24.7 km (15.3 mi)

The 2A65 "Msta-B" (named from the Msta River) is a Soviet towed 152.4 mm howitzer. The "B" in the designation is an abbreviation for Buksiruyemaya, which means towed. This weapon has been fielded in Soviet forces since at least 1987 and as of 2022 is currently in service with Russian front and army level artillery units, as well as the militaries of six other countries, most of them former Soviet republics.

The 2A65 howitzer is capable of firing nuclear artillery shells.

== Development ==
In addition to the towed 152 mm 2A36 Giatsint-B gun, the Soviet Union also deployed a new 152 mm towed howitzer, designated the 2A65, which was allocated the NATO designation of the M1987. This was the year that the weapon was first identified by Western intelligence. According to United Nations sources there were no exports of this weapon between 1992 and 2006. The 152 mm 2A65 is also referred to as the Msta-B and the weapon forms the main armament of the 152 mm self-propelled artillery system, the 2S19, which is also referred to as the Msta-S. Full details of the latter are given in a separate entry. In the designation Msta-B the latter stands for Buksiruemyi, or towed.

== Description ==
The 152 mm howitzer 2A65 (M1987) is mounted on a conventional split trail carriage and, when deployed in the firing position, rests on three points, the hydraulic circular firing jack under the forward part of the carriage and the two spades at the rear. Each of the box section trails has a caster wheel to assist the gun crew in bringing the weapon into action. When deployed in the firing position, these swing upwards through 180° and rest on top of each trail. The 152 mm ordnance is fitted with a muzzle brake and a semi-automatic breech mechanism, spring-operated ramming system, hydraulic counter-recoil device and a liquid-cooled recoil brake. Elevation and traverse is manual, two-speed, with the direct and indirect sighting devices being located on the left side of the weapon. Pneumatic brakes are fitted as standard.

The gun fires the same 152 mm ammunition types as the 152 mm 2S19 self-propelled artillery system and, more recently, a new family of separate loading (for example projectile and charge) 152 mm has been introduced. The standard OF45 high-explosive projectile weighs 43.56 kilograms, has a maximum muzzle velocity of 823 meters per second and a maximum range of 24.7 km. The charges include OF72 (long range), OF58 (full charge) and OF73 (reduced charge). The OF45 projectile can be fitted with different rear ends, for example various types of screw-on boat tails, or the OF61 base bleed projectile which weighs 42.86 kilograms, has a maximum muzzle velocity of 828 m/s and a maximum range of 29 km. The OF23 cargo projectile weighs 42.8 kg, has a maximum range of 26 kilometers and contains 42 High-Explosive Anti-Tank (HEAT) bomblets, each of which can penetrate 100 millimeters of conventional steel armour. Other types of projectile include the HS30 jamming round and the Russian 152 mm Krasnopol laser-guided projectile, which is covered in the entry for the 2S19 self-propelled artillery system. A 155 mm version of this system has been developed but as far as it is known this has not been exported. China has developed a new 155 mm/52 calibre SP artillery system called the PLZ52. This has a turret very similar to the 2S19. In addition to these new 152 mm projectiles the 2A65 can fire all standard types of 152 mm ammunition fired by the older Russian D-20 towed gun-howitzer and the 2S3 self-propelled gun-howitzer.

The howitzer is towed by either the KrAZ-260 6x6 truck or the Ural 4320 6x6 truck. The gun consists of a distinctive two-wheeled carriage, and has an armored shield that slopes to the rear and extends over the wheels. It has been fielded since 1987 and was first deployed by Soviet forces in Eastern Europe.

In Russian Army service, the 2A65 is deployed with the 9th Artillery Brigade in Luga, the 288th Artillery Brigade in Inzhenernyy, and the 291st Artillery Brigade in Maykop, as well as being stored in Perm and near Novgorod. It is also in service with other units in other Russian military districts, including the 381st Guards "Warsaw" Artillery Regiment of the 150th Motor Rifle Division. The total number of active 2A65 howitzers in Russian service is estimated at 370.

The 2A65 is also in service with the Ukrainian Ground Forces, in the 11th Artillery Brigade, Ternopil and the 55th Artillery Brigade, Zaporizhia.

During the 2022 Russian invasion of Ukraine, according to Oryx (website) as of 1 November 2024 at least 122 Russian 2A65 were lost (71 destroyed, 15 damaged, 1 abandoned and 35 captured).

In Defense Forces of Georgia, 2A65 is in service within 5th Artillery brigade of Eastern Army Command.

A self-propelled version, the 2S19 Msta, is produced.

== Operators ==
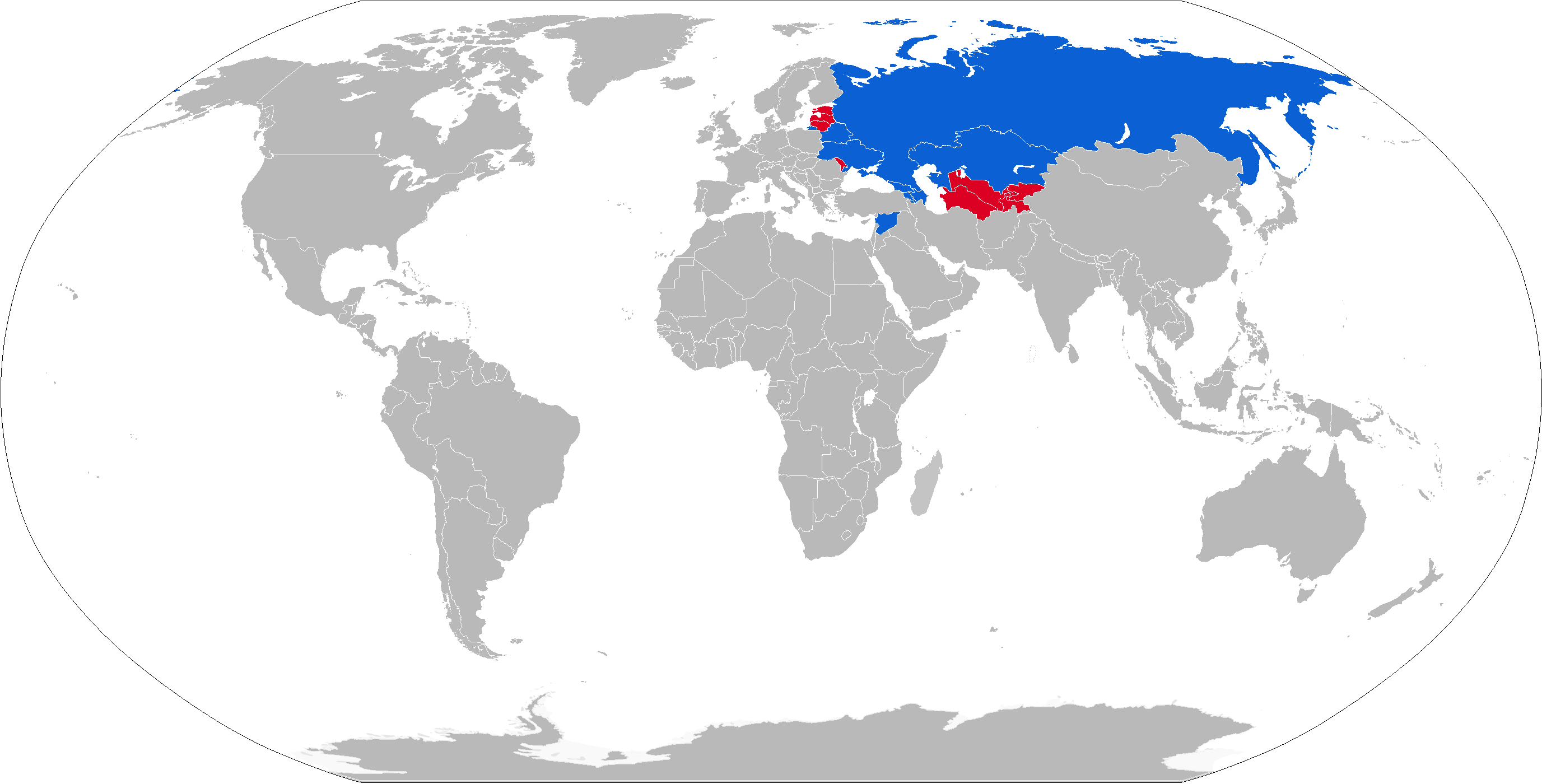
Operators: Current Former

- Belarus: 108
- Georgia: 10
- Kazakhstan: 70
- Russia: ≈400
- Syria
- Turkmenistan: 6
- Ukraine: 70

=== Former operators ===
- Soviet Union

== Variants ==
- M-390 - This is a 155 mm export version of the 2A65, developed by Factory No 9 in Yekaterinburg.
- MZ-146-1 - This is also a 155 mm export version that was shown in public for the first time in 2008. Unlike the original, this variant is fitted with a fume extractor.

== Gallery ==
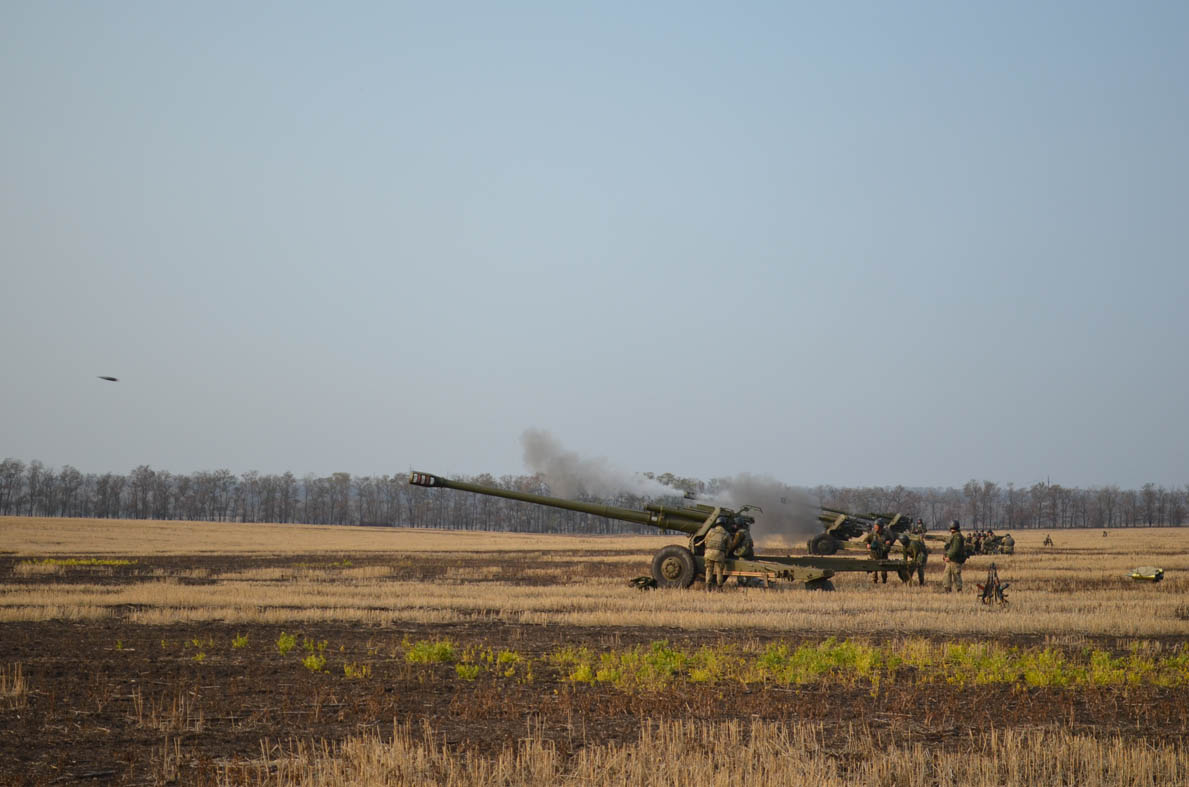

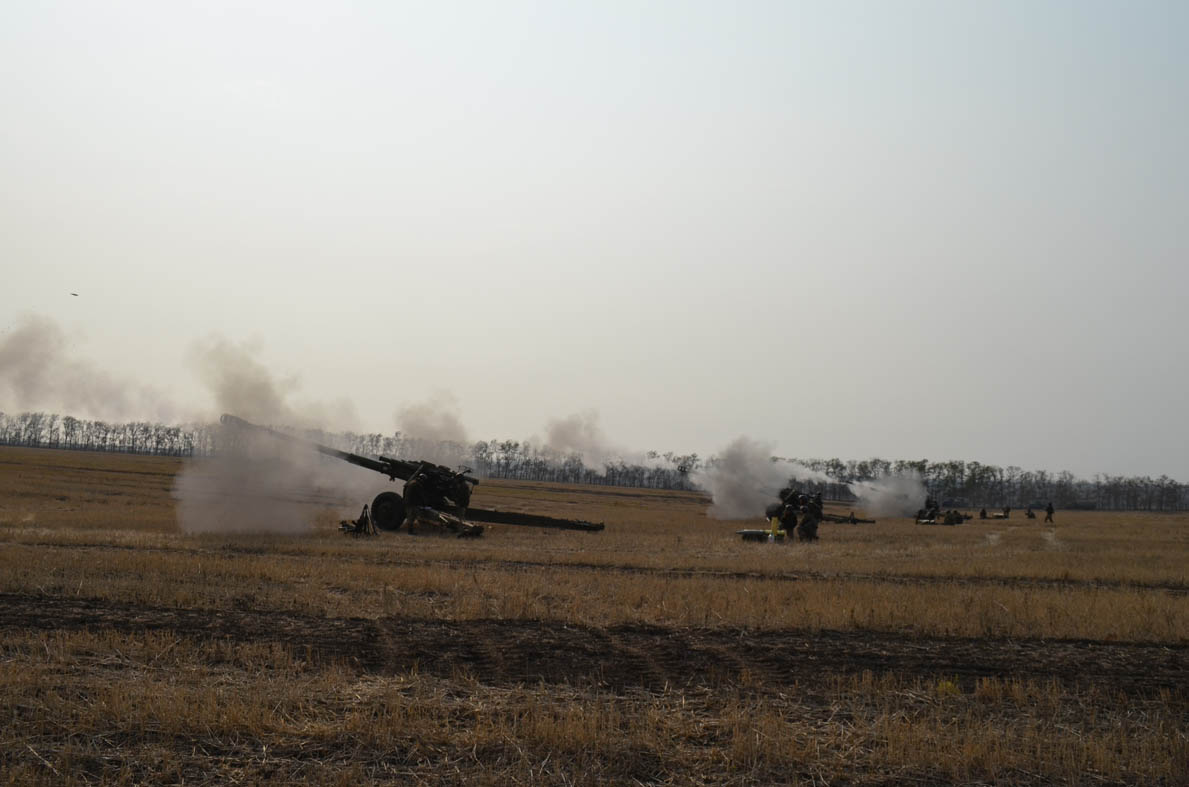

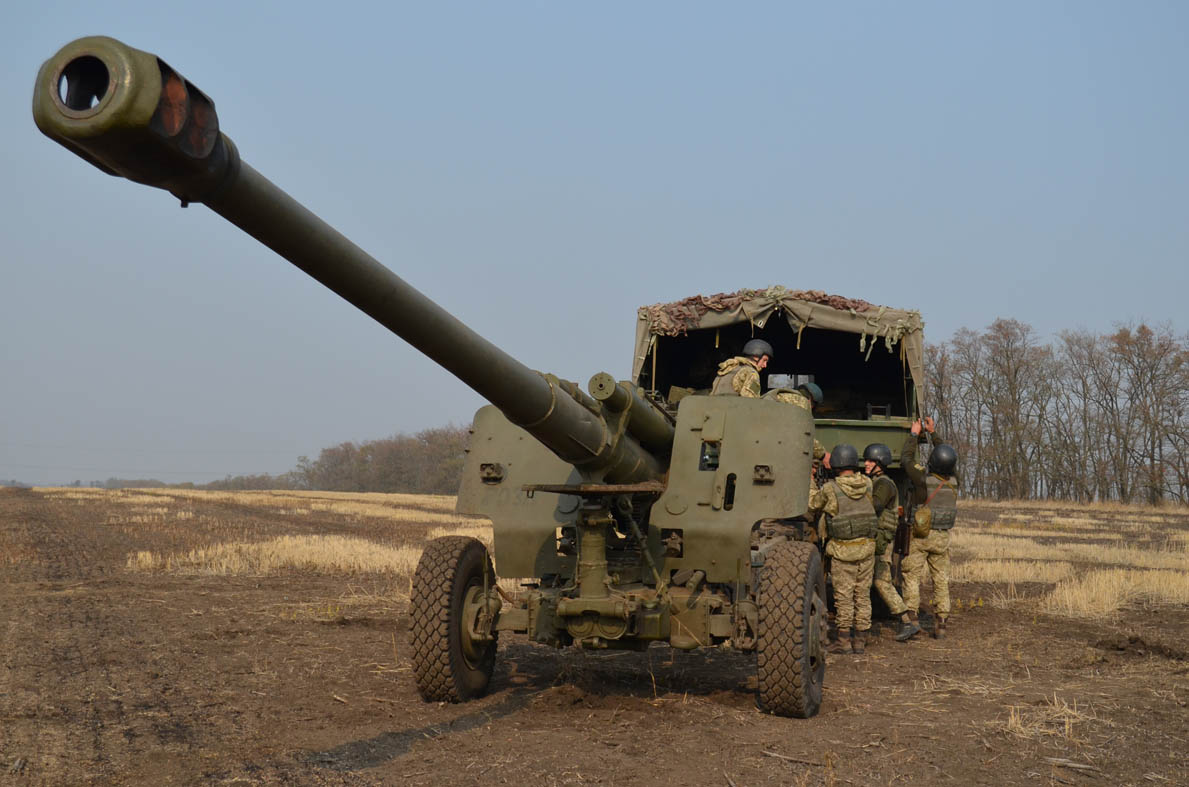

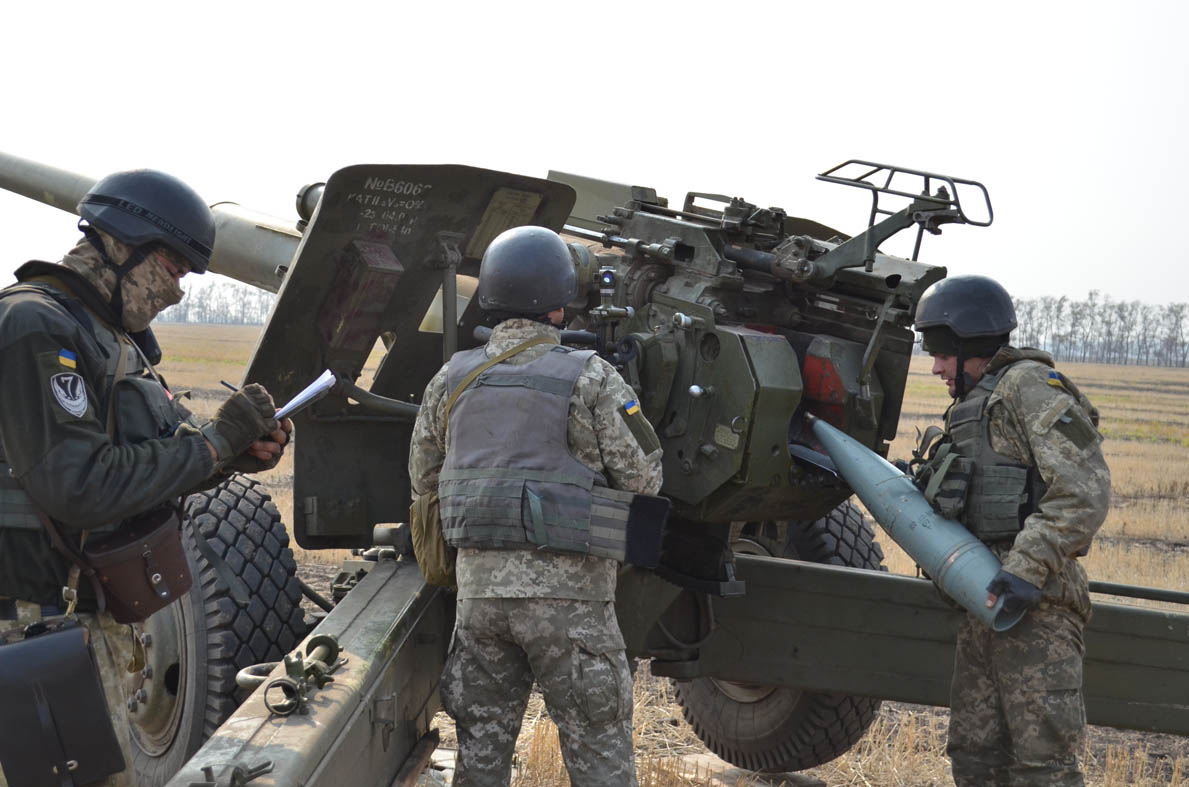

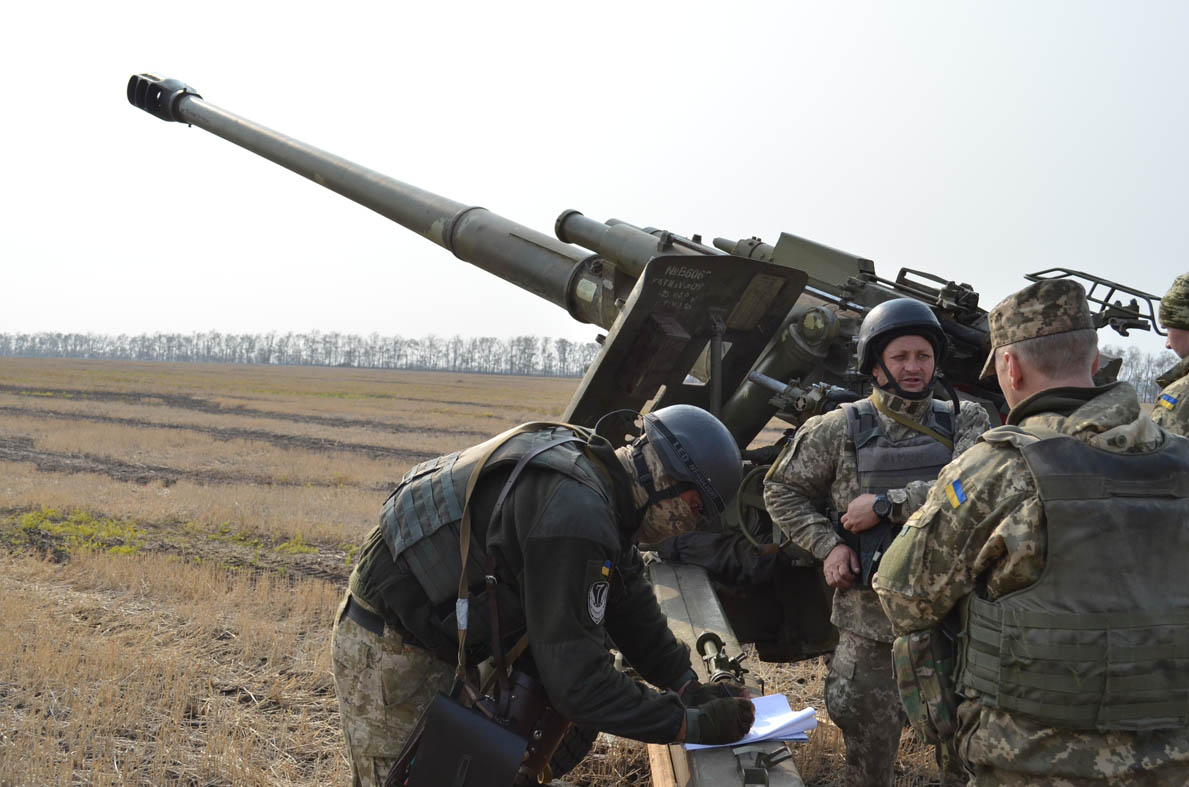

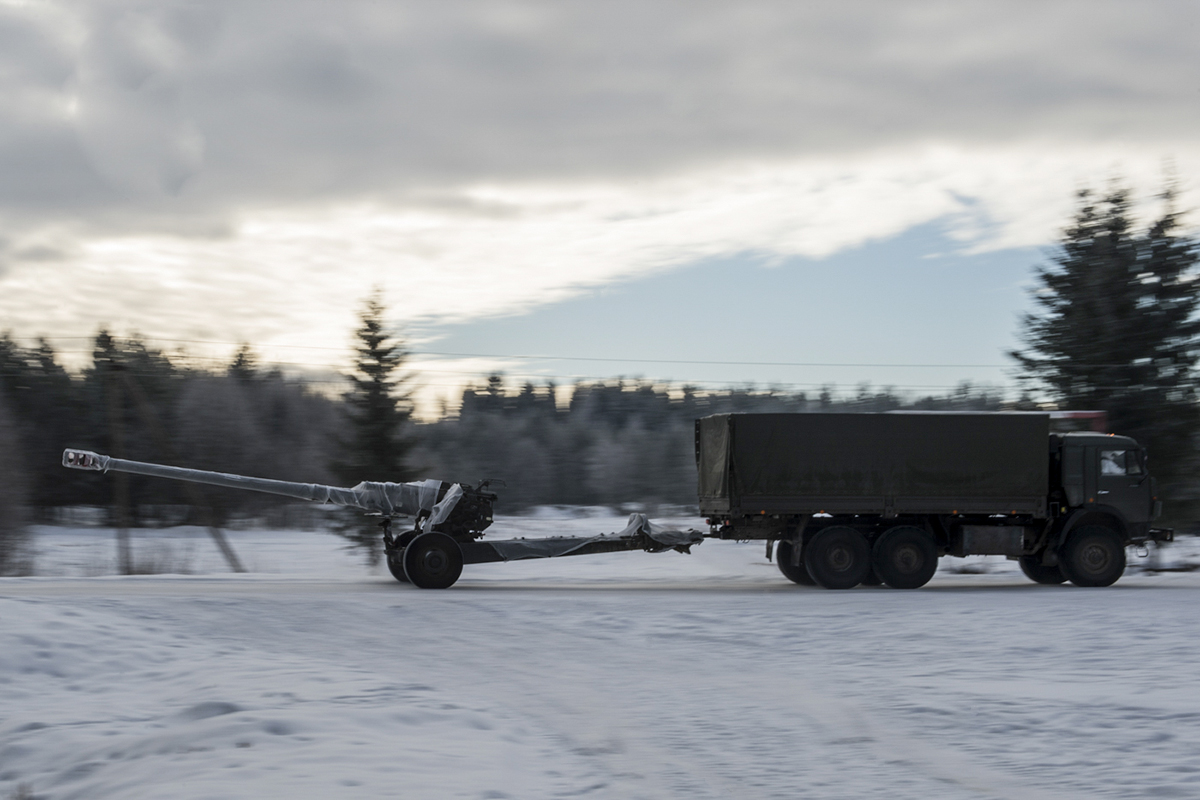

== See also ==
- 2A36 Giatsint-B
