= 2A36 Giatsint-B =

Soviet 152 mm towed field gun

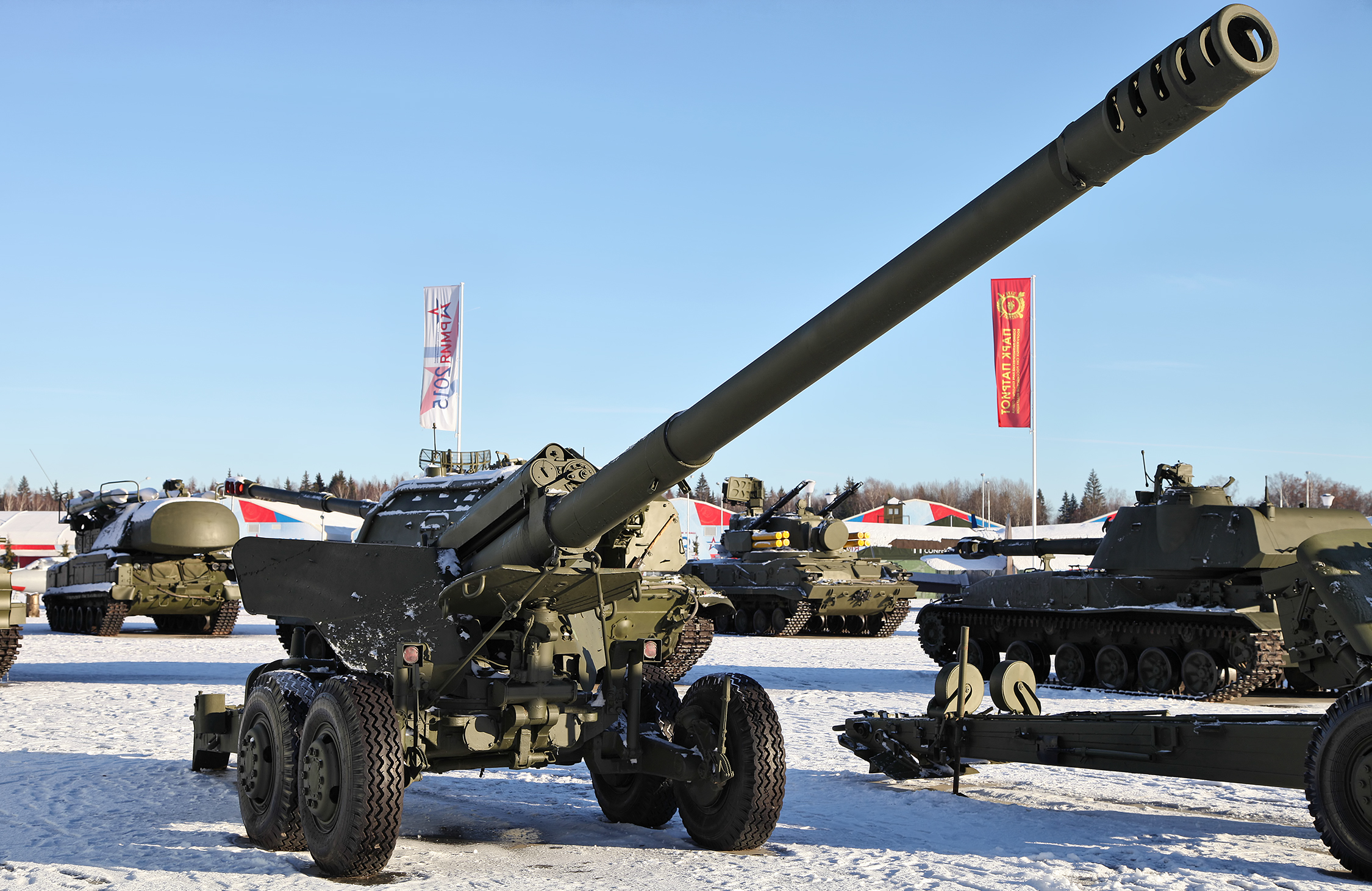
- A Giatsint-B on display at Patriot Park
- Place of origin: Soviet Union

Service history
- In service: 1976−present
- Used by: See operators
- Wars: Gulf War; Second Nagorno-Karabakh War; Russo-Ukrainian War

Production history
- Designer: Yuri Kalachnikov
- Designed: 1968−1975
- Manufacturer: Motovilikha Plants
- Unit cost: US$ 500,000−600,000 (export price, 1995)
- Produced: 1976−1980s
- No. built: 1,500

Specifications
- Mass: 9,800 kg (21,600 lb) (Note: Standard load. When readied for combat the gun mass is 9,760 kg (21,520 lb).)
- Length: 12.3 m (40 ft) (Note: Overall length. When packed for transport the gun length is 12.92 m (42.4 ft).)
- Barrel length: 8.197 m (26.89 ft)
- Width: 2.788 m (9 ft 1.8 in)
- Crew: 8
- Shell: 152.4 mm (6.00 in)
- Caliber: 49
- Breech: Horizontal sliding-block
- Carriage: Split trail
- Elevation: 57° (Note: The gun has can be depressed at a maximum angle of −2.5°)
- Traverse: 25°
- Rate of fire: 6 rounds per minute (Note: Rapid fire rate. According to US intelligence sources, the 2A36 has a sustained rate of fire of 1 round per minute.)
- Maximum firing range: 27,000–40,000 m (30,000–44,000 yd)

The 2A36 Giatsint-B (Russian: Гиацинт; "Hyacinth") is a Soviet towed 152 mm (6.0 in) field gun which entered service in 1976, replacing the 130 mm (5.1 in) M-46 field gun.

The 2A36 has the longest range of any Soviet or Russian 152 mm caliber artillery fielded since the mid-20th century, with a range of 40 km (25 mi) with rocket-assisted projectiles (RAP), while its only outranged by the 203 mm (8.0 in) 2S7 Pion with RAP rounds.

While some guns were exported to Iraq, Finland, and Lebanon, most are in service with the former Soviet republics, including Armenia, Azerbaijan, Russia, and Ukraine and used in local conflicts.

== Development ==
Development of the 2A36 started in December 1968 at the Motovilikha Plants, in Perm, following a requirement from the Soviet Army for a 152 mm (6.0 in) weapon to replace the aging 130 mm (5.1 in) M-46 field gun. A towed and a self-propelled version (2S5 Giatsint-S) were developed.

In early 1971 two prototypes of the 2A36 were built, with mass production starting in 1976, and in that same year Western intelligence designated the towed gun as the 152 mm gun M1976 until its correct Russian designation became known. It was first seen in public during a parade held in Moscow in May 1985.

== Design ==
According to Janes, the Giatsint-B primary role is counter-battery fire, while a Ukrainian source states that the gun is also designed to suppress and destroy enemy troops and equipment concentrated or on the move, as well demolishing strongholds.

The 2A36 152 mm 49 caliber barrel is fitted with a multislotted muzzle brake weighing 141 kg (311 lb), while the recoil system features a buffer and a recuperator. The breech is a semi-automatic horizontal sliding-block, and a hydropneumatic loading assist system is also provided (which uses the energy from the recoil) with a chain-driven rammer for the projectile and the cased propellant charge. The 2A36 can be manually loaded in case of failure of the hydraulic rammer, but at the expense of a lower firing rate. According to Russia, the Giatsint-B can fire 6 shells per minute and that a battery can deliver almost one tonne of ammunition against a target in one minute.

The gun is mounted on a conventional split trail carriage with a gun shield to provide the crew protection against shrapnel and shell fragments. The walking beam suspension gives the 2A36 improved off-road mobility and has a total of four rubber-tyred braked roadwheels. The gun is normally towed by a KrAZ-260 6×6 truck, but it can also be towed by the KrAZ-255B, Ural 4320 6×6 trucks, or tracked artillery tractors such as the AT-T, ATS-59, and the AT-S. The KrAZ-260 can tow the gun at a maximum speed of 80 km/h (50 mph) on-road, while the maximum speed is reduced to 35–45 km/h (22–28 mph) off-road.

The 2A36 can fire a variety of separate-loading ammunition including high-explosive fragmentation (HE-FRAG) with a maximum range of 27,000 m (30,000 yd), armour-piercing tracer (AP-T) for direct fire against tanks and other armoured vehicles, and rocket-assisted projectiles (RAP) rounds with a maximum range of 40,000 m (44,000 yd). Other types of munitions the 2A36 can fire include smoke, concrete-piercing, and incendiary shells. According to the United States Marine Corps Intelligence, the 2A36 can also fire chemical, nuclear, and laser-guided Krasnopol shells. During tests, the gun successfully fired under temperatures ranging from −50–50 °C (−58–122 °F).

The ammunition used by the Giatsint-B is of a newer design and not interoperable with earlier 152 mm artillery systems including the 2S3 Akatsiya. While the 2A36 Giatsint-B and 2S5 Giatsint-S have identical ballistics, they use different types of shells.

== Operational history ==
The 2A36 was exported to Finland (locally designated as the 152 K-89) and Iraq. According to the Stockholm International Peace Research Institute, at least six guns were exported to Lebanon in 1982. During the early 1990s, Russia offered it for export at around US$ 500,000−600,000 per system in an attempt to obtain foreign currency and keep some production lines open, but according to United Nations reports, there was no known exports of this weapon between 1992 and 2009.

Most Iraqi guns were destroyed or captured during the Gulf War in 1991. It was also used during the Second Nagorno-Karabakh War in 2020. According to the OSINT website Oryx, the Armenians lost at least 15 guns, most of them were destroyed by Bayraktar TB2 drones.

Although Russian forces largely made use of self-propelled artillery during the War in Donbas, they also made use of the towed Giatsint-B. Following the Russian invasion of Ukraine in 2022, Ukrainian forces have also used the Giatsint-B and the Finnish-supplied 152 K-89 as well. As of December 2024, Russia lost at least 53 guns while Ukraine lost 16, according to video and photographic evidence analyzed by Oryx.

== Operators ==
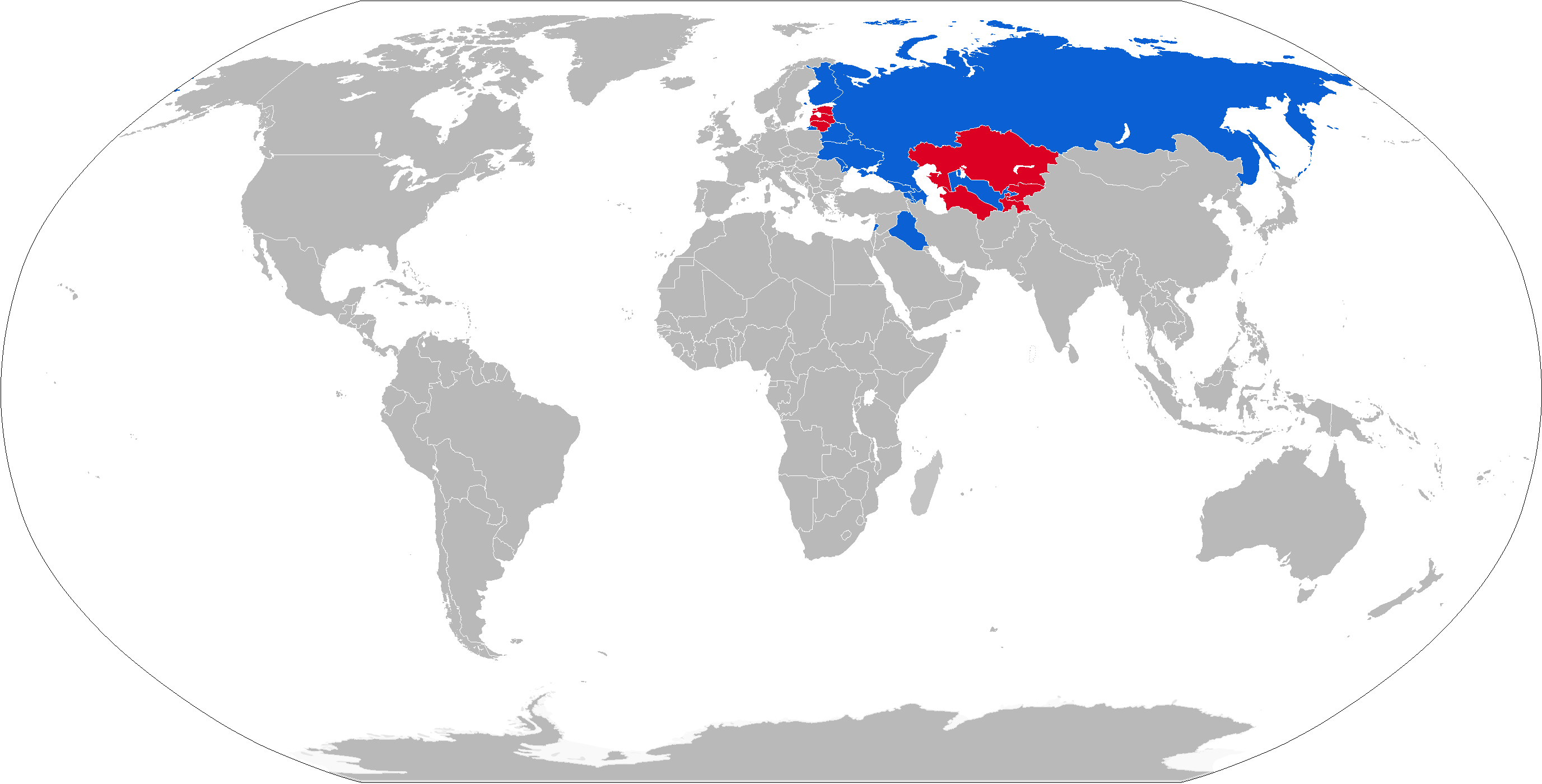
A map of 2A36 operators in blue with former operators in red

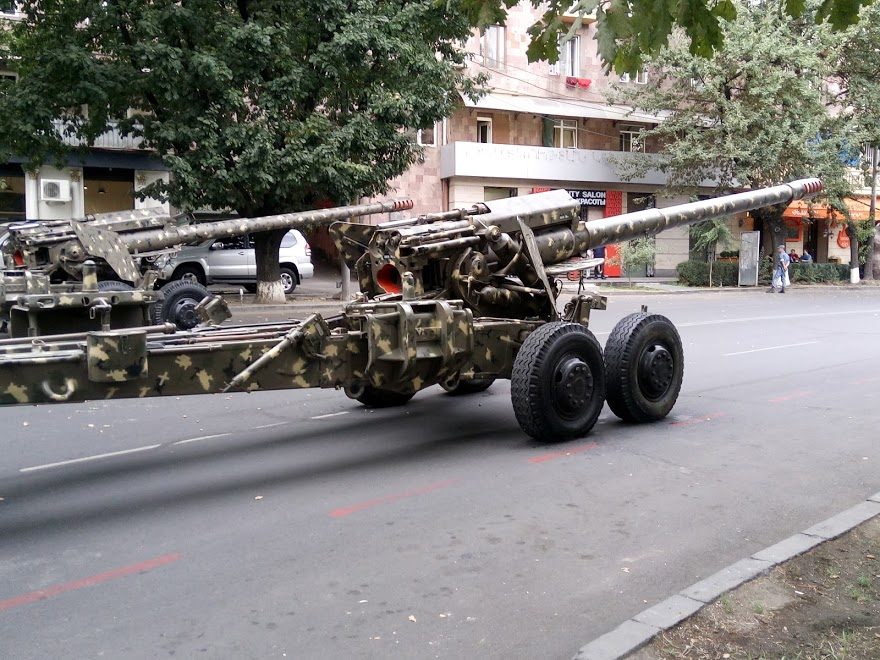
An Armenian 2A36 in Yerevan

=== Current ===
- Armenia − 26
- Azerbaijan − 49
- Finland − 24 designated as the 152 K-89. Unknown number of guns donated to Ukraine
- Georgia − 3
- Moldova − 20
- Russia − 550 used by the Ground Forces, plus 50 used by the Naval Infantry, unknown number used by the Airborne Forces
- Turkmenistan − 6
- Ukraine − 75 used by the Ground Forces, plus an unknown number used by the Naval Infantry
- Uzbekistan − 140

=== Former ===
- Artsakh − Seized by Azerbaijan after the 2023 Azerbaijani offensive in Nagorno-Karabakh
- Belarus − 50
- Iraq − 180
- Kazakhstan − 180
- Lebanon − 6
- Soviet Union – Passed on to successor states

== See also ==
- M198 howitzer – American 155 mm towed howitzer
- FH70 – British/German/Italian 155 mm towed howitzer
- 2S5 Giatsint-S – Soviet 152 mm self-propelled gun
