= 29th Heavy Mechanized Brigade =

29th Heavy Mechanized Brigade (2025–present) 29th Tank Battalion (2022–2025)
- (29-та важка механізована бригада)
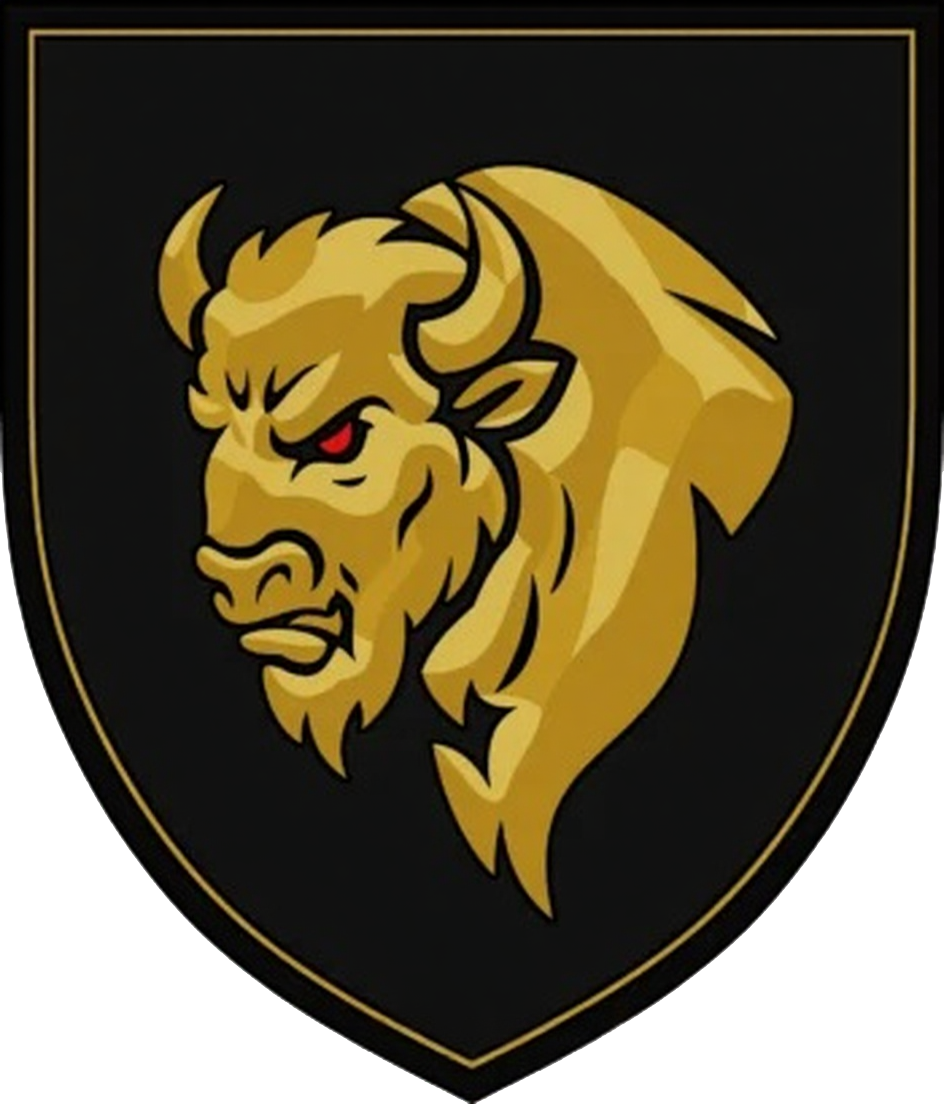
- Shoulder Sleeve Insignia
- Active: 2022–present
- Country: Ukraine
- Allegiance: Armed Forces of Ukraine
- Branch: Armed Forces of Ukraine
- Role: Mechanized Infantry
- Size: Brigade
- Mottos: Strength & Resilience
- Engagements: Russo-Ukrainian War
- Website: Official Facebook page

Commanders
- Current commander: Col. Taras Mazurok

Insignia
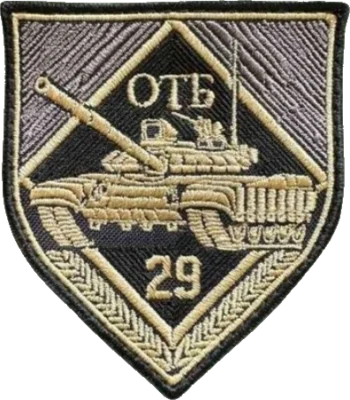
- Former insignia

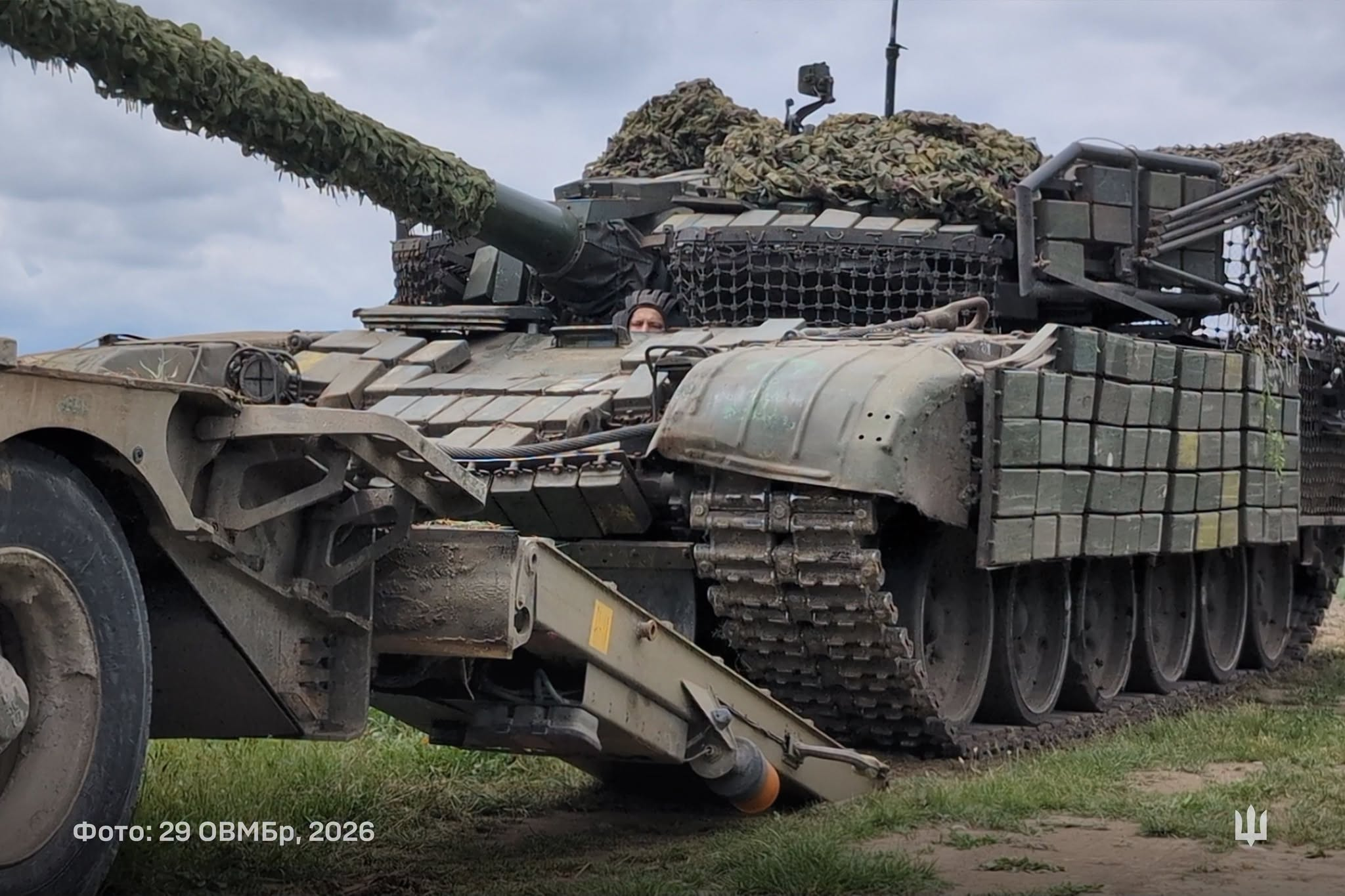
T-72 of the Brigade being loaded on a truck

The 29th Separate Heavy Mechanized Brigade (Ukrainian: 29-та окрема важка механізована бригада; MUN А5081) is a military formation of the Ukrainian Ground Forces.

== History ==
29th Heavy Mechanized Brigade is a unit of the Ukrainian Ground Forces.

It was originally formed as the 29th Tank Battalion at some point during 2025; however, due to the corps-brigade reformation within the Ukrainian Defense Force, the brigade was upscaled to the size of a heavy mechanized brigade in late September 2025.

In October 2025, the insignia of the brigade was revealed.

== Structure ==
As of 2025 the brigade's structure was as follows:

- 29th Tank Brigade
  - Brigade Headquarters and HQ Company
    - 1st Tank Battalion
    - 2nd Tank Battalion
    - 1st Mechanized Battalion
    - 2nd Mechanized Battalion
    - Rifle Battalion “Babay”
    - Unmanned Systems Battalion “Roland”
    - Field Artillery Regiment
      - HQ and HQ Battery
      - Anti-Tank Battalion
    - Anti-Aircraft Missile Defense Divizion
    - Reconnaissance Company
    - Combat Engineer Battalion
    - Logistic Battalion
    - Maintenance Battalion
    - Signal Company
    - Radar Company
    - Medical Company

== See also ==
- 12th Heavy Mechanized Brigade
- 17th Heavy Mechanized Brigade
- 117th Heavy Mechanized Brigade
