= 65th Mechanized Brigade =

Ukrainian Ground Forces unit

- 65-та механізована бригада
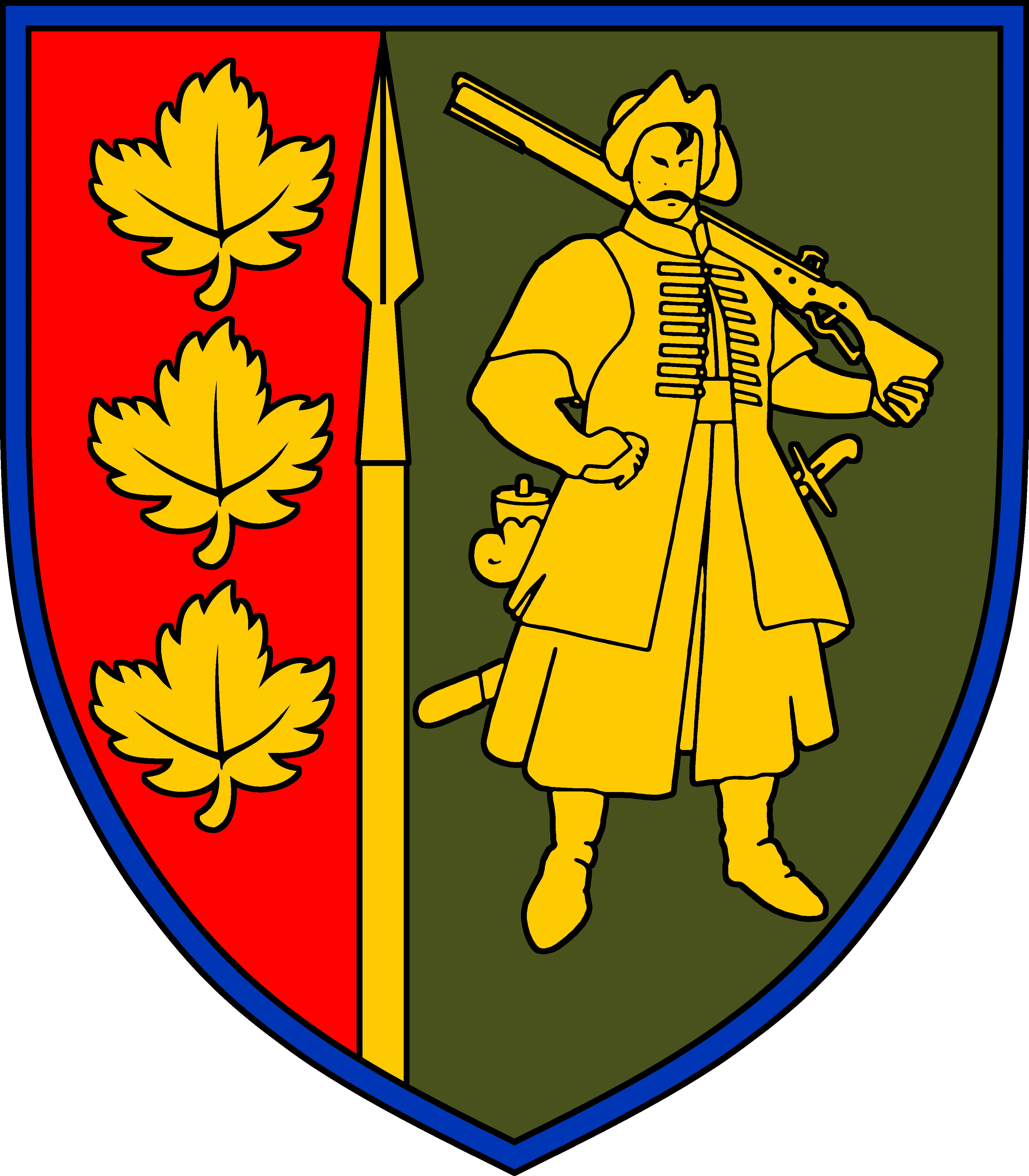
- Insignia of the brigade
- Active: April 18, 2022 - present
- Country: Ukraine
- Branch: Ukrainian Ground Forces
- Role: Mechanized Infantry
- Size: Brigade
- Garrison/HQ: Starychi, Lviv Oblast
- Motto: "Great Meadow"
- Engagements: Russo-Ukrainian War
- Website: Official Facebook page

The 65th Mechanized Brigade “Velykyi Luh” (Ukrainian: 65-та окрема механізована бригада «Великий Луг») is a brigade of the Ukrainian Ground Forces.

== History ==
The brigade was officially activated in April 2022. By December 2022, it had already been deployed to the frontlines, engaging in battles along the Zaporizhzhia direction.

In June 2023, the brigade played a role in Ukraine’s counteroffensive, spearheading an assault toward Melitopol, a strategically significant city under Russian occupation. As part of this operation, Ukrainian forces successfully captured the village of Robotyne. However, their advance was ultimately halted by entrenched Russian resistance nearby. Among the standout figures during this campaign was Major Taras Mykhalchuk, known by his call sign "The Spaniard," who served as the deputy commander of the 3rd battalion. For his leadership in planning and executing the assault on Robotyne, Mykhalchuk was awarded the prestigious Order of Bohdan Khmelnytsky, 2nd class. Reflecting on the operation later, Mykhalchuk admitted that he initially believed his unit’s attack might have been intended as a diversionary maneuver. The sector around Orikhiv and Robotyne was notorious for being one of the most heavily mined and fortified stretches of the entire frontline.

By September 2024, the brigade remained stationed near Orikhiv in Zaporizhzhia Oblast, holding the same stretch of the front where they had fought since 2022. On December 20, 2024, the brigade’s steadfast commitment earned formal recognition from President Volodymyr Zelenskyy, who bestowed upon it the honorary title “Great Meadow” through a presidential decree.

== Structure ==
As of 2025, the brigade's structure is as follows:

- 65th Mechanized Brigade
  - Headquarters & Headquarters Company
  - 7th Rifle Battalion
  - 56th Rifle Battalion
  - 57th Rifle Battalion
  - 1st Mechanized Battalion
  - 2nd Mechanized Battalion
  - 3rd Mechanized Battalion
  - Tank Battalion
  - Artillery Group
  - Anti-Aircraft Defense Battalion
  - Reconnaissance Company
  - Drone Battalion
  - Engineer Battalion
  - Logistic Battalion
  - Signal Company
  - Maintenance Battalion
  - Radar Company
  - Medical Company
  - CBRN Protection Company
