= 162nd Brigade =

162nd Brigade may refer to:

== Ukraine ==
- 162nd Mechanized Brigade

== United Kingdom ==
- 162nd (East Midland) Brigade
- 162nd (Camberwell) Brigade, Royal Field Artillery

== United States ==
- 162nd Infantry Brigade (United States)

== See also ==
- 162nd Division (disambiguation)
- 162nd Regiment (disambiguation)
