= 144th Brigade =

144th Brigade may refer to:

- 144th Mechanized Brigade, Ukraine
- 144th Infantry Brigade (United Kingdom)

== See also ==
- 144th Regiment (disambiguation)
