= 154th Mechanized Brigade =

Ukrainian Ground Forces unit

- 154-та окрема механізована бригада
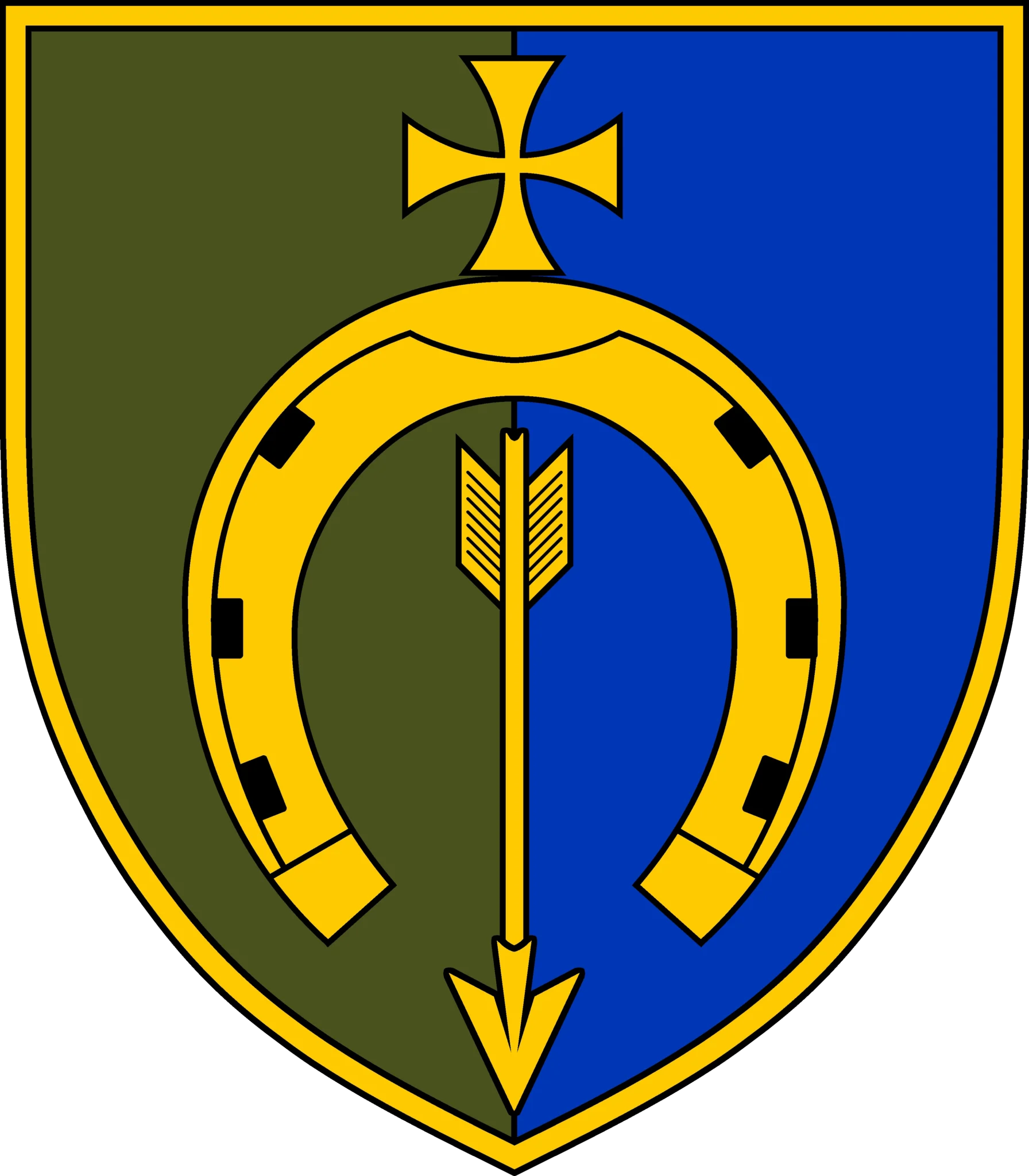
- Active: 1 November 2023 – present
- Country: Ukraine
- Allegiance: Armed Forces of Ukraine
- Branch: Ukrainian Ground Forces
- Type: Mechanized Infantry
- Size: Brigade
- Part of: Operational Command South
- Motto: Called by War
- Engagements: Russo-Ukrainian war (2022–present); Northern Kharkiv Oblast front of the Russo-Ukrainian war; Huliaipole offensive
- Website: 154.mil.gov.ua

Insignia
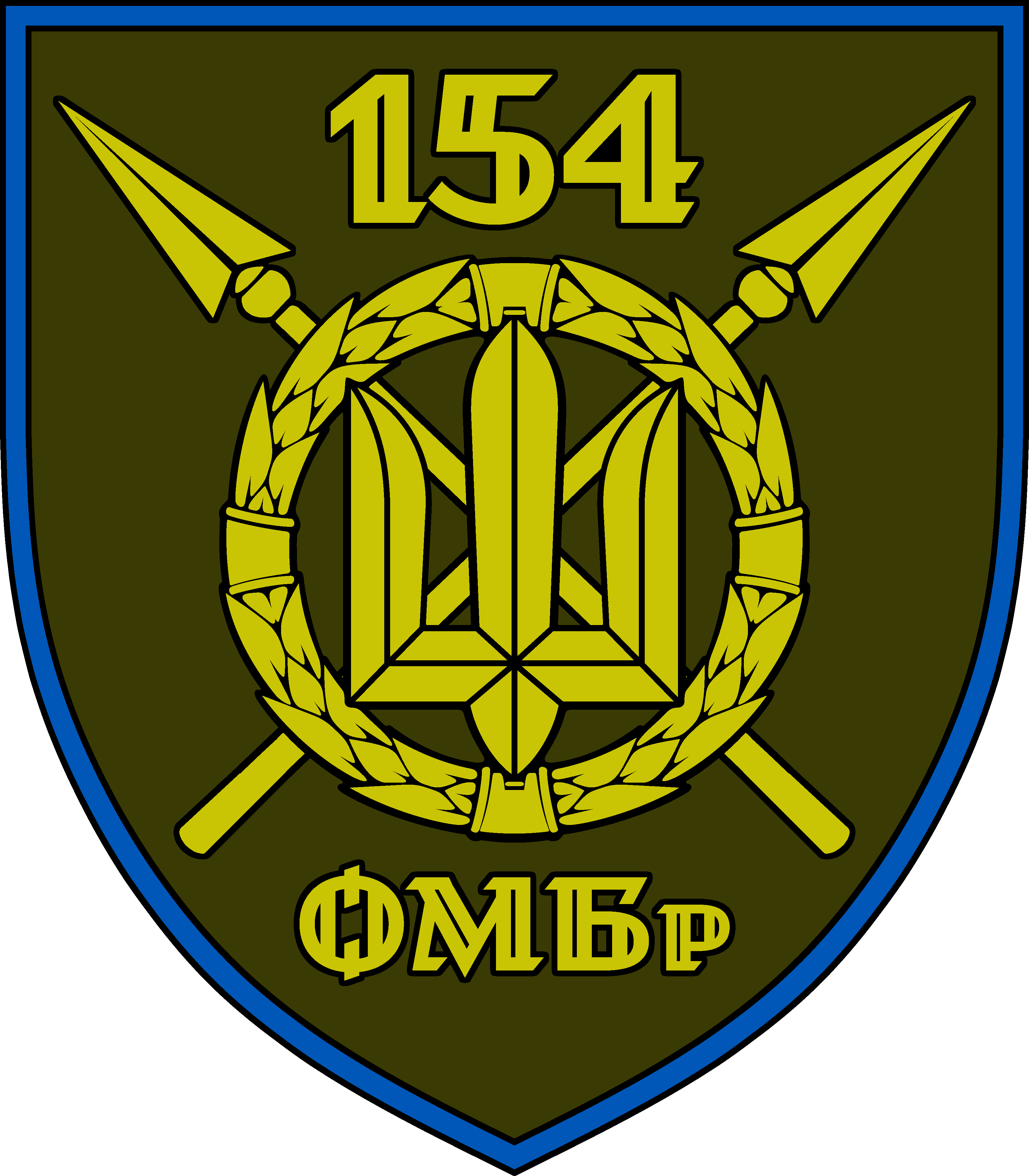
- Former insignia

The 154th Mechanized Brigade (Ukrainian: 154-та окрема механізована бригада, romanized: 154 okrema mekhanizovana bryhada; MUN A4962) is a unit of the Ukrainian Ground Forces formed in November 2023. It was created together with four other brigades in an effort to expand the Ukrainian Ground Forces in response to the 2022 Russian Invasion of Ukraine.

== History ==
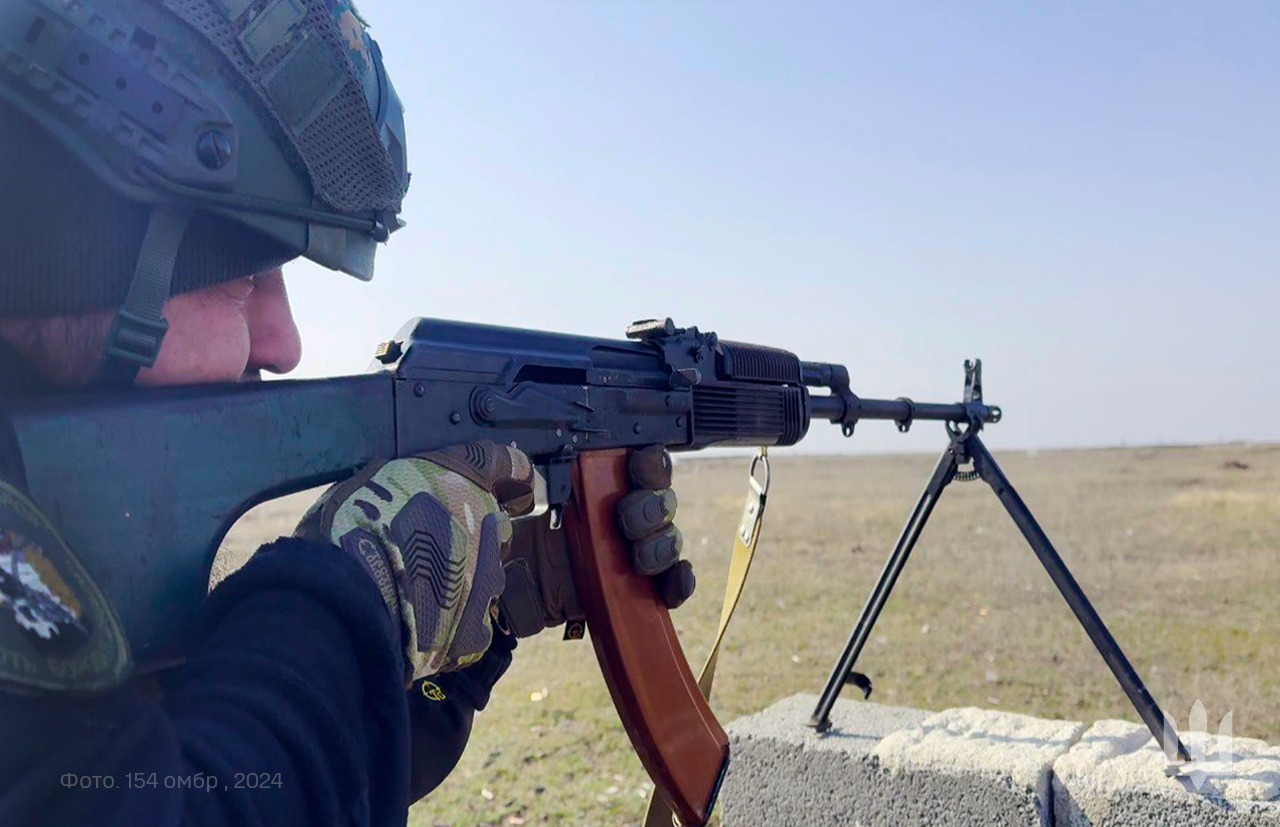
A soldier of the brigade with an RPK light machine gun.

The creation of the brigade was announced on 1 November 2023. The unit was created alongside four other mechanized brigades – 150th, 151st, 152nd, and 153rd – accounting for a five percent expansion of the Ground Forces. It was expected to participate in combat actions in the following year, as well as the anticipated Ukrainian counteroffensive in 2024. It was also reported that the 154th Mechanized Brigade could strengthen Ukrainian defenses across the frontline, predominantly in eastern Ukraine, to ensure the relief and rotation for depleted units deployed there.

In early 2025, the brigade was operating near Vovchansk in Kharkiv Oblast. Later, the unit was transferred to Zaporizhzhia Oblast to take part in the defense of Huliaipole.

On 28 June 2026, the Operational Command South reported that the brigade commander, Colonel Volodymyr Kononnikov, was found dead with a gunshot wound.

== Equipment ==
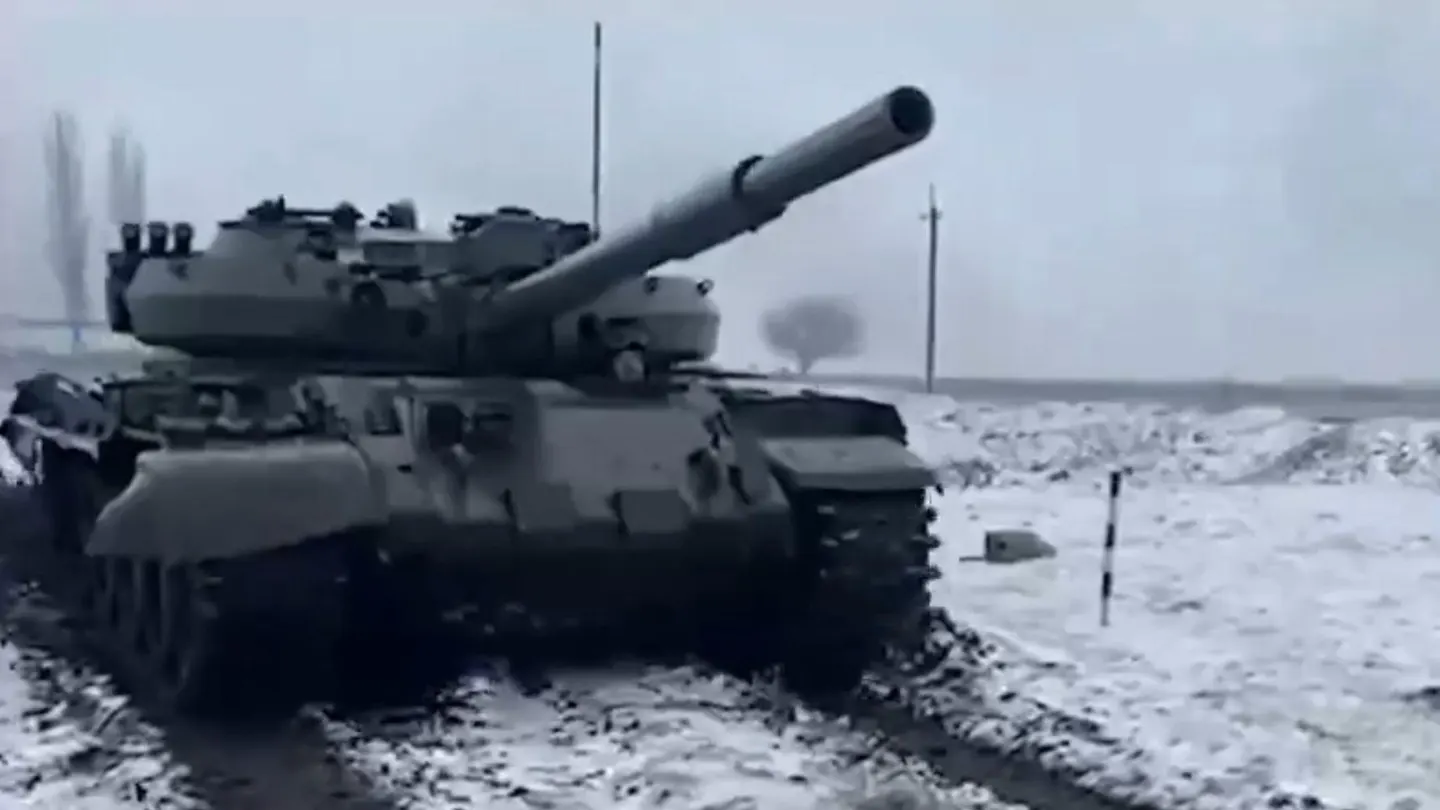
T-62 tank belonging to the brigade.

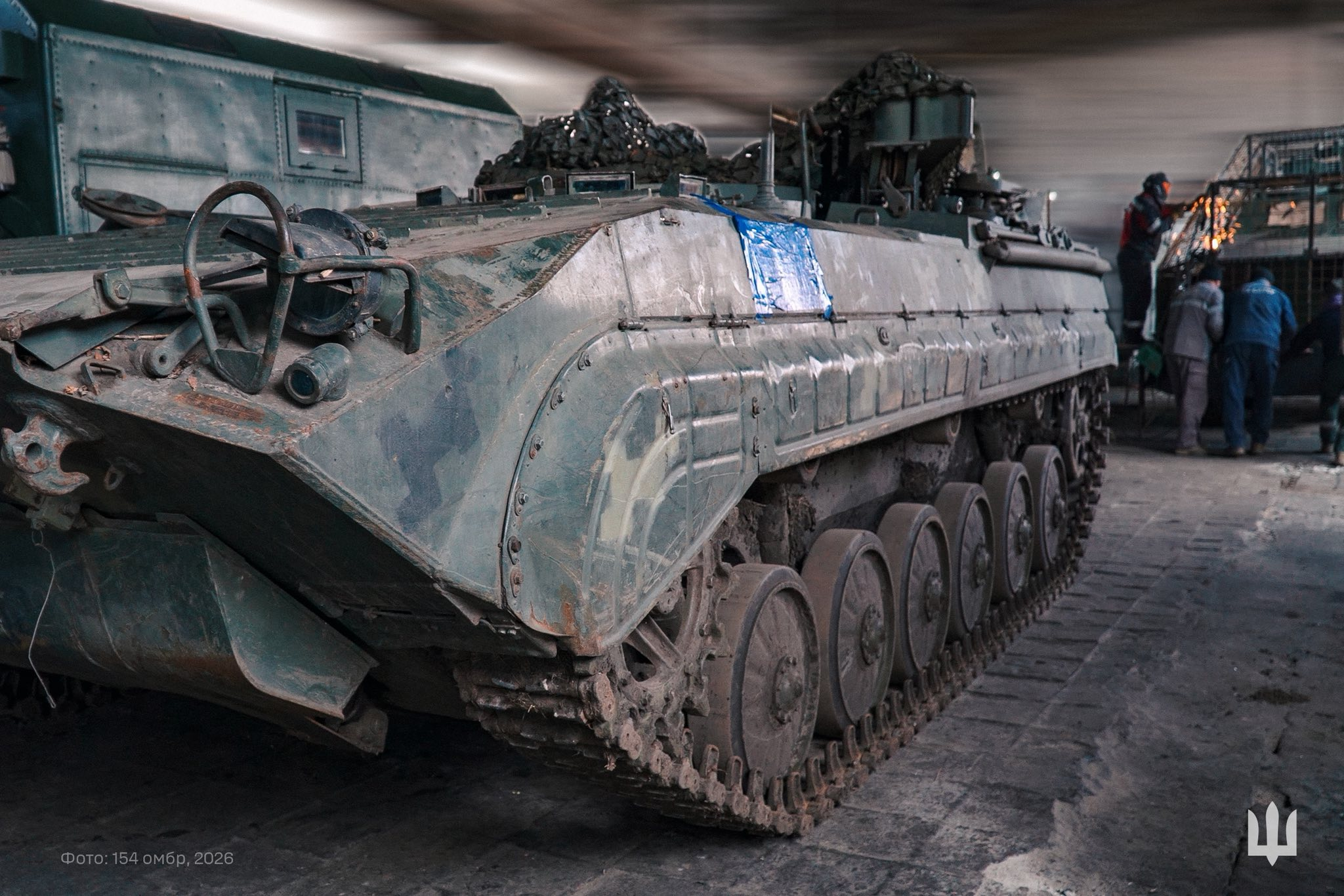
Repair shop with vehicles of the Brigade. BMP-1 the in foreground

According to David Axe from Forbes, the brigade did not receive much in the way of modern fighting vehicles from foreign aid, instead having to rely on western and Soviet vehicles from the early 1960s and 1970s. A video published by the Ukrainian Ministry of Defense suggested that the brigade might operate T-62 tanks captured from the Russian forces; however, it isn't clear whether they belong to the brigade or the training grounds.

As of September 2024, the brigade operates the following vehicles:

- T-62 – Soviet main battle tank
- BRDM-2 – Soviet amphibious armored scout car
- BMP-1 – Soviet amphibious tracked infantry fighting vehicle
- 2S1 Gvozdika – Soviet self-propelled howitzer
- VAB – French armoured personnel carrier and support vehicle
- M-1117 – American armored security vehicle

== Structure ==
As of October 2023, the structure of the brigade is as follows:

- 154th Mechanized Brigade
  - Brigade's Headquarters
  - 1st Mechanized Battalion
  - 2nd Mechanized Battalion
  - 3rd Mechanized Battalion
  - Tank Battalion
  - Reconnaissance Company
  - Artillery Group
  - Anti-Aircraft Defense Battalion
  - Engineer Battalion
  - Logistic Battalion
  - Signal Company
  - Maintenance Battalion
  - Radar Company
  - Medical Company
  - Chemical, biological, radiological, and nuclear Protection Company
