= 12th Heavy Mechanized Brigade =

12th Heavy Mechanized Brigade (2025 – present) 12th Tank Battalion (2019 – 2025)
- Ukrainian: 12-й окремий танковий батальйон
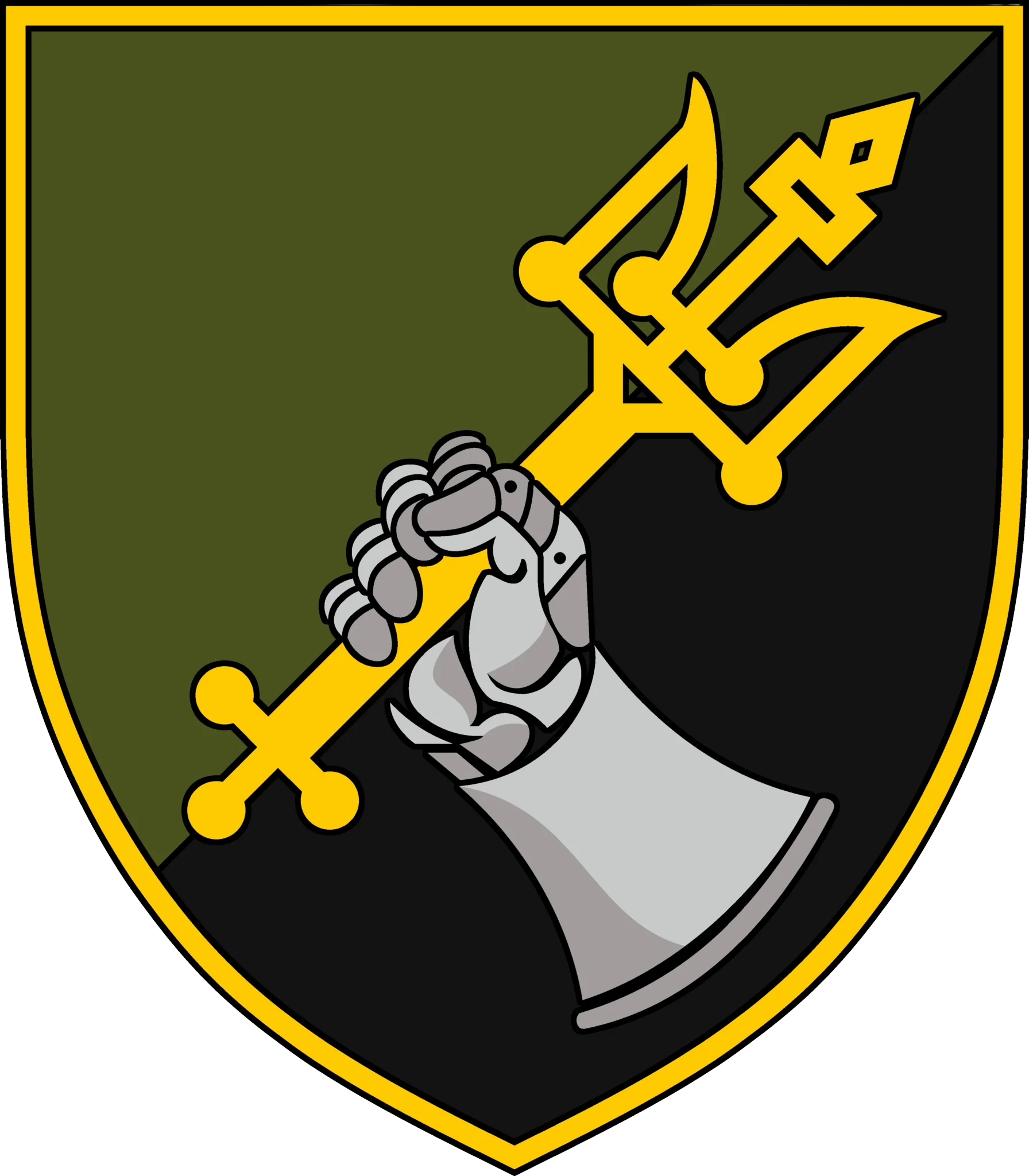
- 12th Tank Battalion shoulder sleeve patch
- Active: December 30, 2019 – present
- Country: Ukraine
- Branch: Ukrainian Ground Forces
- Type: Mechanized Infantry
- Role: Mechanized
- Size: Brigade
- Part of: Operational Command North 10th Army Corps
- Garrison/HQ: Honcharivske; MUN А0932
- Equipment: T-64BM "Bulat"

The 12th Heavy Mechanized Brigade is an mechanized formation of the Ukrainian Ground Forces. It was formally known as 12th Independent Tank Battalion before 2025 reorganization. The Brigade is located in Honcharivske.

== History ==
=== Formation ===
The formation of the unit began towards the end of 2017. Later, amid a reform of units, the planned size of the unit was increased. On 12 June 2019, it was announced by Operational Command North that a new tank battalion was being formed in Honcharivske. Stationed in same town as Ukraine's 1st and 4th Tank Brigades, it is an independent battalion. A recruitment drive was held in Kyiv-Sviatoshyn Raion on 25 June and in Uman on 3 July 2019. The battalion received T-64BM "Bulat" tanks from 1st Tank Brigade and from reserve weapons depots. The battalion's mission is to protect northern part of Chernihiv Oblast, with the support of the 61st Jager Infantry Brigade.

== Past commanders ==
- Major Kaptan Oleksandr 2019 - 9 May 2021
- Major Hasparian Serhiy 9 May 2021 -
