= 162nd Mechanized Brigade =

Ukrainian Ground Forces unit

- 162-га окрема механізована бригада
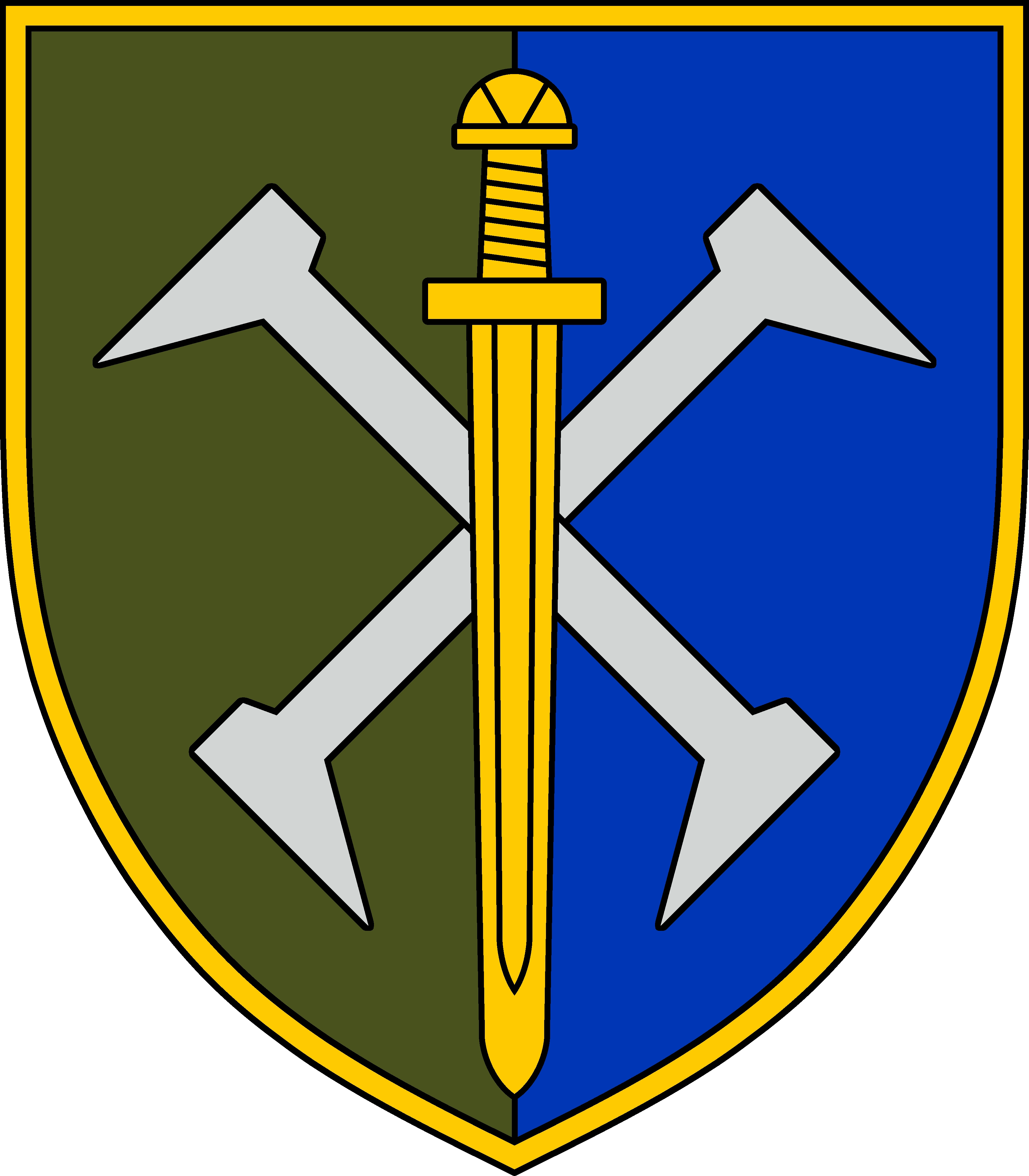
- Shoulder Sleeve Insignia
- Active: 2024 – Present
- Country: Ukraine
- Branch: Ukrainian Ground Forces
- Role: Mechanized Infantry
- Garrison/HQ: Korosten, Zhytomyr Oblast
- Motto: Officium Vocat
- Engagements: Russian Invasion of Ukraine
- Website: Official Facebook page

Insignia
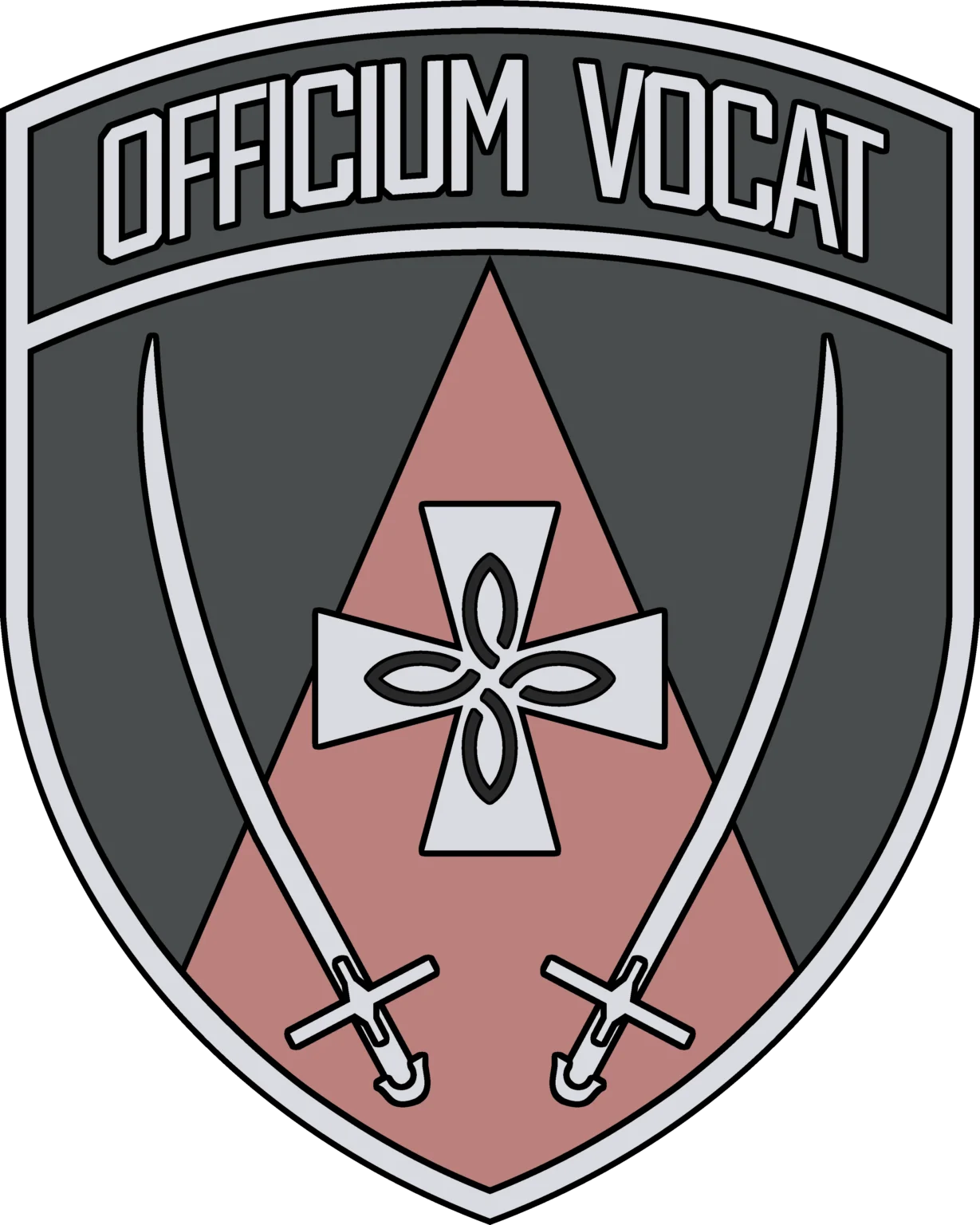
- Former Insignia

The 162nd Mechanized Brigade (Ukrainian: 162-га окрема механізована бригада) is a mechanized brigade of the Ukrainian Ground Forces that was formed in 2024.

== History ==
The brigade was formed in the summer of 2024. The formation of the unit was part of a larger expansion of the Ukrainian Army that plans to form 10 new brigades with their numerical designation in the 160s.

== See also ==
- 160th Mechanized Brigade
