= 66th Mechanized Brigade =

Ukrainian Ground Forces unit

- 66-та окрема механізована бригада
- Shoulder Sleeve Insignia
- Active: 18 April 2022 - Today
- Country: Ukraine
- Branch: Ukrainian Ground Forces
- Role: Mechanized Infantry
- Patron: Mstislav the Brave
- Engagements: Russo-Ukrainian war; Russian invasion of Ukraine; Eastern front; 2022 Kharkiv counteroffensive; Lyman front; Battle of Bakhmut
- Website: https://66ombr.army

Commanders
- Current commander: Col. Yury Dvorsky

The 66th Mechanized Brigade named after Prince Mstislav the Brave (Ukrainian: 66-та окрема механізована бригада імені князя Мстислава Хороброго) is a brigade of the Ukrainian Ground Forces formed in 2022.

== History ==
After the Russian invasion in February 2022, the brigade was mobilized and transferred to the Ground Forces combat composition. Units of the brigade took part in the recapture of Lyman, losing 25 soldiers. The brigade's units were in the battles for Bakhmut from October 2022 until May 2023.

As of June 2023, units of the brigade were operating in the Luhansk Oblast near the villages of Makiivka and Ploshchanka.

On 28 July 2023, the brigade was awarded the honorary title "named after Prince Mstislav the Brave" by decree of President Volodymyr Zelenskyy. The brigade was fighting on the Lyman front as of April 2025.

== Structure ==
As of 2024, the brigade's structure is as follows:

- 66th Mechanized Brigade,
  - Brigade Headquarters and HQ Company
  - 1st Mechanized Battalion
  - 2nd Mechanized Battalion
  - 3rd Mechanized Battalion
  - 69th Separate Rifle Battalion (69 OSB A4612)
  - Tank Battalion
  - Field Artillery Regiment
    - Headquarters and Target Acquisition Battery
    - 2x Self-propelled Artillery Battalions
    - Anti-tank Artillery Battalion
    - MLRS Artillery Battalion
  - Anti-Aircraft Defense Battalion
  - Sniper Platoon
  - Reconnaissance Company
  - Attack Drone Company "Birds"
  - Combat Engineer Battalion
  - Logistic Battalion
  - Signal Company
  - Maintenance Battalion
  - Radar Company
  - Medical Company
  - Chemical, Biological, Radiological and Nuclear Defense Company
  - Military police Platoon
  - Brigade Band
