= 160th Mechanized Brigade =

Ukrainian Ground Forces unit

- 160 окрема механізована бригада
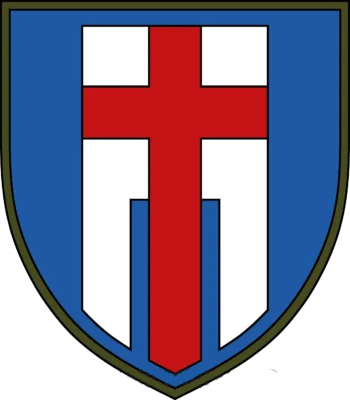
- Active: June 25, 2024 – Present
- Country: Ukraine
- Allegiance: Armed Forces of Ukraine
- Branch: Ukrainian Ground Forces
- Role: Mechanized Infantry
- Size: Brigade
- Part of: Operational Command West
- Garrison/HQ: Starychi, Lviv Oblast
- Engagements: Russo-Ukrainian war: Full scale invasion
- Website: Official Facebook page

Insignia
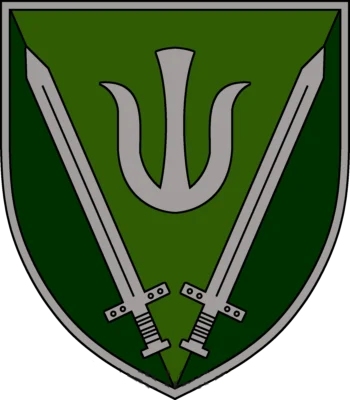
- Former patch (2024–2025)

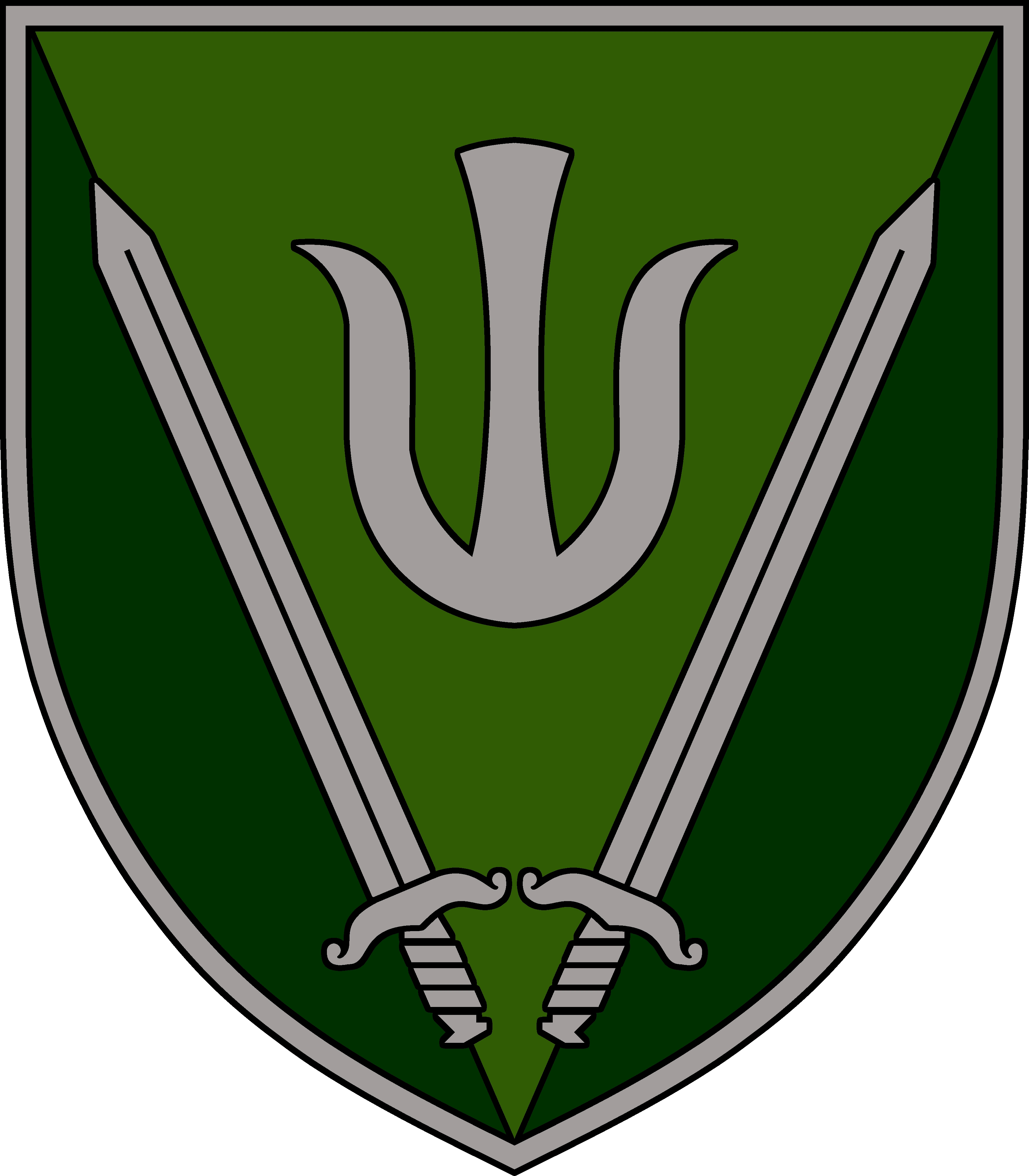
- Former patch (2024)

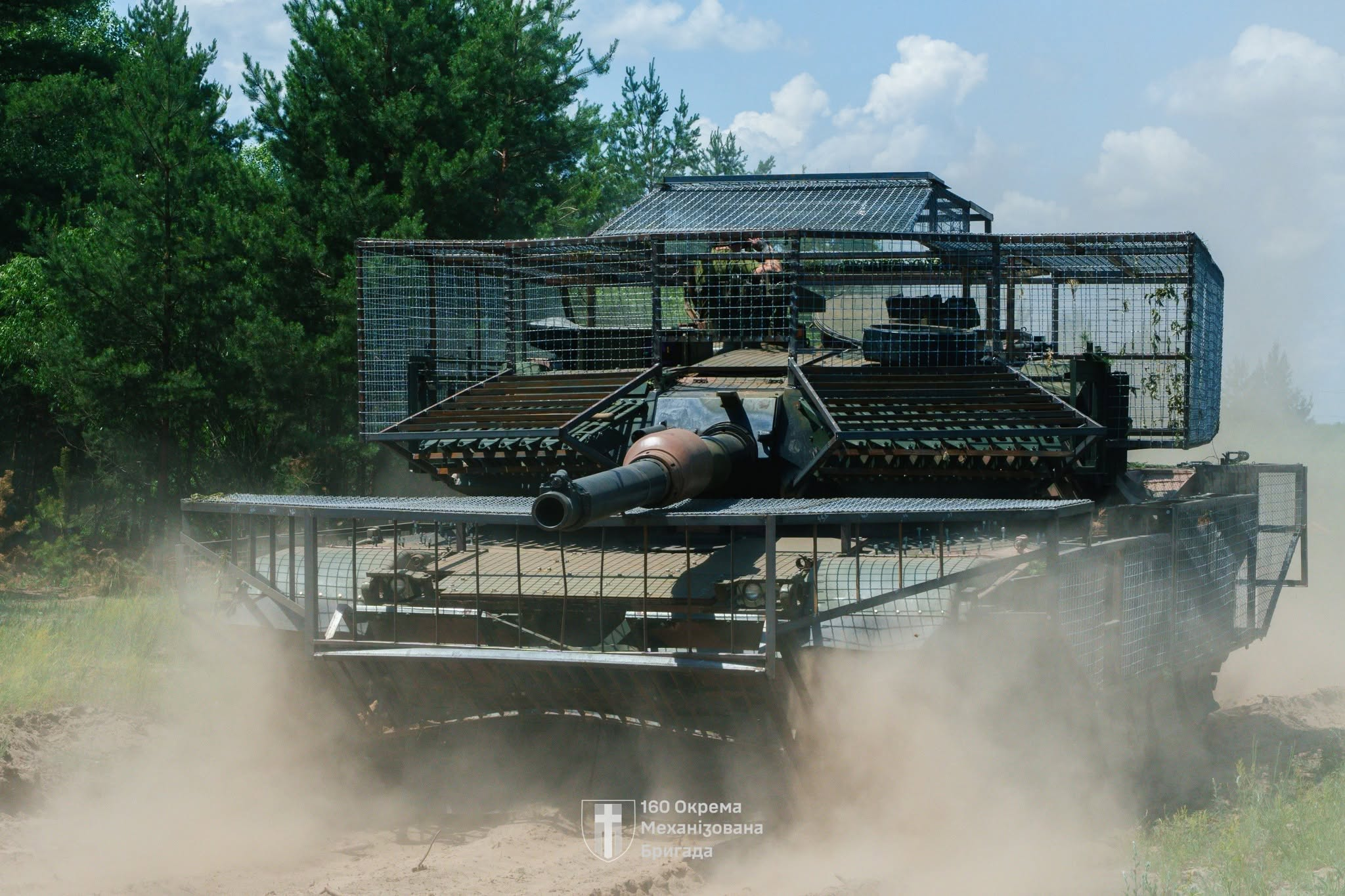
Modified M1 Abrams of the Brigade

The 160th Separate Mechanized Brigade (MUN A4977) is a mechanized brigade of the Ukrainian Ground Forces that was formed in 2024.

== History ==
The brigade was formed in the summer of 2024. The formation of the 160th Mechanized Brigade is part of a larger expansion of the Ukrainian Army that plans to form 10 new brigades with their numerical designation in the 160s. All of these brigades will be formed from freshly mobilized troops. The brigade was reported to be undergoing training in Poland.

== Structure ==
- Headquarters
  - 1st Mechanized Battalion
    - 1st Mechanized Battalion
    - 2nd Mechanized Company
    - 3rd Mechanized Company
    - Grenade Launcher Platoon
    - Reconnaissance Platoon
    - Mortar Battery
    - Anti-Aircraft Platoon
    - Communications Platoon
    - Medical Platoon
    - Support Company
  - 2nd Mechanized Battalion
    - 1st Mechanized Battalion
    - 2nd Mechanized Company
    - 3rd Mechanized Company
    - Grenade Launcher Platoon
    - Mortar Battery
    - Anti-Aircraft Platoon
    - Reconnaissance Platoon
    - Communications Platoon
    - Medical Platoon
    - Support Company
  - 3rd Mechanized Battalion
    - 1st Mechanized Battalion
    - 2nd Mechanized Company
    - 3rd Mechanized Company
    - Grenade Launcher Platoon
    - Mortar Battery
    - Anti-Aircraft Platoon
    - Reconnaissance Platoon
    - Communications Platoon
    - Medical Platoon
    - Support Company
  - 1st Rifle Battalion
  - Medical Company
