= Mechanized Infantry (Ukraine) =

Mechanized Infantry Forces
- Механізовані війська
- The Mechanized Infantry branch insignia
- Active: 1992–present
- Country: Ukraine
- Branch: Ukrainian Ground Forces
- Type: Mechanized Infantry / Armored forces
- Size: 67 brigades
- Anniversaries: 6 May, Day of the Mechanized Infantry

Insignia
- Shoulder sleeve insignia

Mechanized Infantry Forces of Ukraine (Ukrainian: Механізовані війська, romanized: Mekhanizovani viiska) are the general basis and primary combat formations of the Ukrainian Ground Forces. They execute tasks of holding the occupied areas, lines and positions tasks of enemy's impacts repelling, of penetrating the enemy's defense lines, defeating the enemy forces, capturing the important areas, lines and objectives, capture and expel enemy forces from territory and can operate in structure of marine and landing troops.

The Mechanized Infantry Corps of the Ukrainian Ground Forces are organized into mechanized infantry brigades and motorized infantry brigades that help perform the principal missions entrusted to the Ukrainian Ground Forces and the wider Armed Forces as a whole.

== History ==
When the Ukrainian Ground Forces had been formed on the basis of the Soviet Army in Ukraine in 1991-92, the majority of the new forces involved infantry (motor rifle/mechanized) divisions, a few of these with roots dating back to the Russian Civil War and the Ukrainian War of Independence and majority with Second World War battle honours.

What are today the 24th, 28th, 30th, 72nd, 92nd and 108th Brigades, among others, were then infantry divisions, which would become infantry brigades in the 21st century and are the oldest in active service.

In 2000, when the National Guard was merged with the Internal Troops, a few National Guard of Ukraine units, including the current Presidential Brigade were given to the Ukrainian Ground Forces instead of undergoing reflagging as special police formations.

Following Euromaidan and in the midst of the first years of the Russo-Ukrainian War the heritage of many of the brigades was replaced, under the insistence of President Petro Poroshenko, with the identities of the infantry and cavalry of both the Ukrainian People's Republic and West Ukrainian People's Republic of the War of Independence and their short-lived armed forces, with some of the honorifics celebrating other heroes from Ukraine's past.

Battle honours won during the Second World War and Soviet orders and decorations were removed from unit titles and their colours. It was in these circumstances that the forces gradually expanded again with the raising of more brigade-level formations in the infantry, coupled with the Westernized training regimen and the modernization of the forces, which resulted in the debut of three more specialities for the Ukrainian infantry:

- Mountain infantry brigades
- Motorized infantry brigades
- Rifle infantry brigades

In the wake of the full Russian invasion of Ukraine in 2022, a new type of infantry speciality was created to assist in the needs of the Ukrainian Ground Forces in this current period:

- The Assault infantry brigade, with the creation of the 3rd and 5th Brigades in 2022

All of these brigades constitute the Infantry Corps of the Ukrainian Ground Forces.

=== Organization of the Ukrainian mechanized infantry division until the 2000s ===
- Division Headquarters and Headquarters Battalion
- 3x Mechanized Infantry Brigades/Regiments
- Armored Brigade/Regiment
- Field Artillery Regiment/Brigade
- Anti-Air Defense Missile Artillery Battalion/Regiment
- Mortar Battery
- Combat Engineer Regiment/Battalion
- Signals Battalion
- Reconnaissance Battalion
- Logistics/Combat Service Support Regiment
- Chemical, Biological, Radiological and Nuclear Defence Company
- Radar Company
- Military Police Company/Platoon
- Division Band

== Brigade organization ==
The Ukrainian Ground Forces Mechanized infantry brigades, which are the majority of those units of the Infantry Corps, are traditionally structured around either the tracked BMP-1 or BMP-2 IFV or a variant of the BTR wheeled family of APCs or IFVs (like the BTR-3 and BTR-4). These brigades are designed to be able to conduct combined arms maneuver warfare in an effort to take and hold territory from enemy forces in wartime operations.

Doctrinally, the mechanized infantry brigades are built around three mechanized infantry battalions with a supporting motorized infantry battalion and tank battalion. The Russian invasion in 2022, opted the brigades to integrate militia battalions raised in the beginning of the invasion into brigade rifle infantry battalions as part of its Order of Battle, increasing their size further, with the latter addition in 2023 of an assault infantry battalion. As such some of the brigades are already nearing division size in strength.

Motorized infantry formations, a much more younger type of infantry brigade that debuted in the 2010s after Euromaidan and are a legacy of the war in Donbas, are organized around the Humvee systems or similar vehicles, including those of Ukrainian manufacture. However, they do not have a tank battalion assigned to it. Their medium counterparts, the Jäger (Rifle) Infantry Brigades, are similarly organized but have a tank battalion, and can be either mechanized or motorized in its composition and armaments. Mechanized rifle infantry brigades may have an option for a motorized rifle battalion in its brigade Order of battle to put in line with the rest of the infantry brigades. Assault infantry brigades, a newer form of infantry brigade which was created in light of the 2022 invasion, are different, in which these are dedicated as the offensive assault forces in wartime operations against enemy formations and fortified positions in conjunction with other types of infantry brigades and the armor.

These brigades perform the same duties of combined arms operations as in the regular mechanized infantry brigades in both peacetime and war. Due to brigades being designed for independent operations in peace and war, these brigades have a complete set of organic supporting units including a headquarters and Headquarters company, a complete field artillery regiment, an anti-tank battalion, an anti-aircraft defense battalion, a sniper company, a recon company, an engineer battalion, material repair battalion, logistics battalion, electronic warfare company, radar company, CBRN defense company, signals company, medical company, a commandant's platoon and a military band under brigade Headquarters.

Since the start of the 2022 Russian Invasion of Ukraine, the size and composition of Ukraine's mechanized and motorized infantry brigades, as well as its rifle infantry and assault infantry brigades, have changed dramatically to include both more men - and women - as the Armed Forces of Ukraine constantly mobilize but also to include the different kinds of weapons and equipment being supplied by Ukraine's Western backers.

Ukraine's two mountain infantry brigades are organized in like manner as the mechanized infantry but are organized for mountain warfare operations in wartime as well as other operations as needed and are armed similarly.

=== Mechanized Infantry ===
==== Brigade Headquarters and Headquarters Company ====
- Command Platoon
- HQ Elements

===== Mechanized Infantry Battalion (x3) =====
- Headquarters and Headquarters Company
- Infantry Company (x3/x4)
- Mortar Battery (6x 120mm)
- Grenade Platoon (6x AGS-17)
- Reconnaissance Platoon
- Air Defense Platoon (9x Igla Man-portable air-defense system)
- Engineer and Sapper Platoon
- Signals Platoon
- Battalion Medical Center
- Forward Support Company
  - Technical Support Platoon
  - Material Support Platoon

Battalions armed with variants of the BTR family (BTR-70, BTR-80, BTR-3, BTR-4) notionally will have 600 personnel mounted in 45 vehicles. Battalions armed with variants of the BMP family of vehicles (BMP-1, BMP-2) notionally will have 520 personnel mounted in 40 vehicles.

===== Motorized Infantry Battalion =====
- After the 2016 reforms, each mechanized infantry brigade received one motorized infantry battalion. But after the Russian invasion in 2022, mechanized brigades have seen more motorized battalions attached to themselves. The battalions are organized in like manner as their mechanized counterparts and are armed with Humvees or similar vehicles, many of them nationally produced in Ukraine.

===== Rifle Infantry Battalion =====
- The 2022 invasion of Russia in Ukraine saw each mechanized infantry brigade add one rifle infantry battalion upon the urging of the Ministry of Defence of Ukraine to the brigade Order of Battle. The battalions are organized in like manner as the motorized battalions under the brigade framework and are based on the civilian militia battalions that were raised to resist the Russian invasion of the country. These battalions may or may not have similar vehicles as the motorized battalions use.

===== Assault Infantry Battalion =====
- Also another creation stemming from the aftermath of the 2022 Russian invasion, the assault infantry battalion under mechanized infantry brigades are designated and organized to serve as wartime shock and offensive forces slated to lead up the advance of brigade infantry and armored elements into enemy defensive positions, fortifications, trenches, etc. and attack enemy rear areas on the battlefield as may be assigned by brigade, corps or operational command leadership. In peacetime, these would act as a strategic reserve force for the brigade for peacetime and/or wartime operations.
- A few of these brigades currently have that speciality type battalion and personnel of these battalions are given special training for offensive operations. These battalions are organized in like manner as the mechanized and motorized infantry battalions and are armed and supplied with vehicles similar to those of the mechanized.

===== Tank Battalion =====
- Headquarters and Headquarters Company
  - Signals Platoon
- Tank Company (3x/4x T-64BV)
- Armored Recon Platoon
- Anti Aircraft Platoon
- Engineer and Sapper Platoon
- Forward Support Company
- Medical Station

T-64s and its variants have been the traditional standard tank of the Mechanized Infantry, however some armored battalions are armed with T-72s.

===== Field Artillery Regiment =====
- Headquarters and Target Acquisition Battery
- Recon Battery
- Observer Battery
- Self-propelled artillery Battalion (2x 2S1 Gvozdika)
- Rocket Artillery Battalion (BM-21 Grad)
- Anti-Tank Battalion (under field artillery regiment, otherwise independent under direct brigade command)
  - Headquarters and Headquarters Battery
  - 3x/4x Anti-Tank Batteries (towed/self-propelled/MPATS)
- Security Battalion

===== Anti-Aircraft and Missile Defense Artillery Battalion/Regiment =====
- Headquarters and Headquarters Battery
- If for a battalion:
  - 3x Air Defense Batteries (Towed/SPAAG)
  - Air Defense Missile Artillery Battery
  - Man-portable air-defense system Battery
- If for a regiment:
  - Air defense artillery battalion (towed/SPAAG)
  - Air defense missile artillery battalion
  - Man-portable air-defense system Infantry Battery/Battalion

Sniper Company

Reconnaissance Company

Combat Engineer Battalion

Repair Battalion

Logistics Battalion

Electronic Warfare Company

Radar Company

Chemical, biological, radiological and nuclear Defense Company

Signals Company

Medical Company

Commandants Platoon – Commandant's Platoons are technically military police platoons as all personnel are trained as regimental police officers and staff by the Military Police of the Armed Forces.

Brigade Band – Brigade Bands are military bands made up of personnel of the brigade who are members of the Military Music Department. All musicians of the brigade must have proper musical proficiency and a music degree upon joining the band.

=== Rifle Infantry (Jäger) ===
Motorized/Mechanized Rifle Infantry/Jäger Infantry Battalion (x3)

- Headquarters and Headquarters Company
- Rifle Infantry Company (Mechanized/Motorized) (x3 or x4)
- Mortar Battery (6x 120mm)
- Grenade Platoon (6x AGS-17)
- Reconnaissance Platoon
- Air Defense Platoon (9x Igla MANPADS)
- Engineer and Sapper Platoon
- Signals Platoon
- Battalion Medical Center
- Supply Company
  - Technical Support Platoon
  - Material Support Platoon

The battalions of the rifle infantry brigades are organized in like manner as the motorized infantry battalions under mechanized infantry brigades. However, both the 61st and 68th Brigades fields wheeled and/or tracked mechanized infantry vehicles. The 13th and 141st-144th (Reserve) Rifle Brigades are all motorized formations.

=== Motorized Infantry ===
Motorized Infantry Battalion (x3)

- Headquarters and Headquarters Company
- Motorized Infantry Company (x3)
- Mortar Battery (6x 120mm)
- Grenade Platoon (6x AGS-17)
- Reconnaissance Platoon
- Air Defense Platoon (9x Igla Man-portable air-defense system )
- Engineer and Sapper Platoon
- Signals Platoon
- Battalion Medical Center
- Supply Company
  - Technical Support Platoon
  - Material Support Platoon

The infantry battalions of motorized infantry brigades are organized in like manner as the motorized infantry battalions under mechanized infantry brigades.

Unlike the regular mechanized and mechanized rifle infantry brigades the motorized infantry originally did not have a tank battalion but a few brigades today like the 58th and 59th Brigades have a tank battalion activated in their ORBAT.

== Professional holiday ==
In 2019, 6 May was declared as the official Day of the Mechanized Infantry and thus serves as the official branch holiday of the Mechanized Infantry.

== Brigades list ==
Brigade Name	Garrison / HQ	Unit Designation	Unit Number	Years in Service	Other notes
Infantry Corps, Ukrainian Ground Forces
Regular Infantry Brigades (Mechanized Infantry, Motorized Infantry, Assault Infantry, Jaeger (Ranger))
Separate Presidential Brigade	Kyiv, Kyiv Oblast	ОПБр	A-0222	January 2, 1992 – present	Former 1st National Guard Infantry Regiment, reflagged as UGF unit 2000.
1st Heavy Mechanized Brigade	Honcharivske, Chernihiv Oblast	1 ОВМБр	A-1815	August 24, 1997 – present	Formerly the 1st Tank Brigade, redesignated in 2025.
3rd Assault Brigade	Kyiv, Kyiv Oblast	3 ОШБр	A-4638	November 1, 2022 – present	Raised by veterans of the former Azov Regiment (National Guard) who transferred to the AFU via Special Operations Forces and TDF Brigades.
3rd Heavy Mechanized Brigade	Yarmolyntsi, Khmelnytsky Oblast	3 ОВМБр	A-2573	January 1, 2016 – present	Formerly the 3rd Tank Brigade, redesignated in 2025.
4th Heavy Mechanized Brigade	Honcharivske, Chernihiv Oblast	4 ОВМБр	A-7015	December 6, 2017 – present	Formerly the 4th Tank Brigade, redesignated in 2025.
5th Assault Brigade	N/A	5 ОШБр	A-4010	May 10, 2022 – present	
5th Heavy Mechanized Brigade	Kamianka-Buzka, Lviv Oblast	5 ОВМБр	A-4594	2016 - 2022, January 10, 2023 - present	Formerly the 5th Tank Brigade, redesignated in 2024.
10th Mountain Assault Brigade	Kolomyia, Ivano-Frankivsk Oblast	10 ОГШБр	A-4267	October 1, 2015 – present	
11th Motorized Brigade	Chernihiv Oblast			October 1, 2017 - December 31, 2019	
12th Heavy Mechanized Brigade	Honcharivske, Chernihiv Oblast	12 ОВМБр	A-0932	December 30, 2019 – present	Formerly the 12th Separate Tank Battalion, redesignated in 2025.
14th Mechanized Brigade	Volodymyr, Volyn Oblast	14 ОМБр	A-1008	December 1, 2014 – present	
15th Mechanized Brigade	N/A	15 ОМБр	A-0610	March 15, 2016 - December 31, 2019	
17th Heavy Mechanized Brigade	Kryvyi Rih, Dnipropetrovsk Oblast	17 ОВМБр	A-3283	February 1, 1992 – present	Formerly the 17th Tank Brigade, redesignated in 2024.
21st Mechanized Brigade	Podolsk, Odesa Oblast	21 ОМБр	A-4689	January 21, 2023 – present	
22nd Mechanized Brigade	Chernivtsi, Chernivtsi Oblast	22 ОМБр	A-4718	1941-2003, January 4, 2023 - present	
23rd Mechanized Brigade	Pokrovsk, Donetsk Oblast	23 ОМБр	A-4741	February 18, 2023 – present	
24th Mechanized Brigade	Yavoriv, Lviv Oblast	24 ОМБр	A-0998	February 18, 1992 – present	
28th Mechanized Brigade	Chornomorske, Odesa Oblast	28 ОМБр	A-0666	February 18, 1992 – present	
29th Heavy Mechanized Brigade	N/A	29 ОВМБр	A-5081	2025–present	Formerly the 29th Separate Tank Battalion, redesignated in 2025.
30th Mechanized Brigade	Zviahel, Zhytomyr Oblast	30 ОМБр	A-0409	December 6, 1991 – present	
31st Mechanized Brigade	Zvyahel, Zhytomyr Oblast	31 ОМБр	A-4773	February 17, 2023 – present	
32nd Mechanized Brigade	Ozerna, Kyiv Oblast	32 ОМБр	A-4784	February 9, 2023 – present	
33rd Mechanized Brigade	Pavlohrad, Dnipro Oblast	33 ОМБр	A-4447	April 1, 2016 – present	
41st Mechanized Brigade	Odesa, Odesa Oblast	41 ОМБр	A-4576	March 16, 2023 – present	
42nd Mechanized Brigade	Chortkiv, Ternopil Oblast	42 ОМБр	A-4667	January 25, 2023 – present	
43rd Mechanized Brigade	Dnipro, Dnipropetrovsk Oblast	43 ОМБр	A-4698	March 1, 2023 – present	
44th Mechanized Brigade	Nizhyn, Chernihiv Oblast	44 ОМБр	A-4723	March 2, 2023 – present	
47th Mechanized Brigade	Hostomel, Kyiv Oblast	47 ОМБр	A-4699	April 26, 2022 – present	
51st Mechanized Brigade		51 ОМБр		2004 - 2014	
53rd Mechanized Brigade	Sievierodonetsk, Luhansk Oblast	53 ОМБр	A-0536	April 30, 2014 – present	
54th Mechanized Brigade	Bakhmut, Donetsk Oblast	54 ОМБр	A-0693	December 1, 2014 – present	
56th Motorized Brigade	Mariupol, Donetsk Oblast	56 ОМПБр	A-0989	February 23, 2015 – present	
57th Motorized Brigade	Nova kakhovka, Kherson Oblast	57 ОМПБр	A-1736	October 30, 2014 – present	
58th Motorized Brigade	Konotop, Sumy Oblast	58 ОМПБр	A-1376	February 17, 2017 – present	
59th Assault Brigade	Haisyn, Vinnytsia Oblast	59 ОМПБр	A-1619	December 8, 2014 – present	
60th Mechanized Brigade	Cherkaske, Dnipro Oblast	60 ОМБр	A-1962	November 10, 2015 – present	
61st Mechanized Brigade	Chornomorske, Odesa Oblast	61 ОМБр	A-3425	November 10, 2015 – present	
62nd Mechanized Brigade	Berdychiv, Zhytomyr Oblast	62 ОМБр	A-4467	December 1, 2000 - December, 2022	
63rd Mechanized Brigade	Starokostyantyniv, Khmelnytskyi Oblast	63 ОМБр	A-3719	July 23, 2017 – present	
65th Mechanized Brigade	Starychi, Lviv Oblast	65 ОМБр	A-7013	April 1, 2022 – present	
66th Mechanized Brigade	Oster, Chernihiv Oblast	66 ОМБр	A-7014	April 18, 2022 – present	
67th Mechanized Brigade	Dnipro, Dnipropetrovsk Oblast	67 ОМБр	A-4123	November 1, 2022 – present	Unit was partially disbanded after losing key position while fighting in Chasiv Yar in April 2024, but re-formed with new leadership.
68th Jager Brigade	N/A	68 ОЄБр	A-4056	April 8, 2022 – present	
72nd Mechanized Brigade	Bila Tserkva, Kyiv Oblast	72 ОМБр	A-2167	February 18, 1992 – present	
92nd Assault Brigade	Kluhyno-bashkyrivka, Kharkiv Oblast	92 ОШБр	A-0501	December 2, 1999 – present	Formerly 48th Motor Rifle Division, Central Group of Forces, Czechoslovakia.
93rd Mechanized Brigade	Cherkaske, Dnipropetrovsk Oblast	93 ОМБр	A-1302	January 1, 1992 – present	
100th Mechanized Brigade	Lutsk, Volyn Oblast	100 ОМБр	A-7028	June 26, 2018 – present	Formerly the 100th Separate Brigade of the Territorial Defense Forces.
110th Mechanized Brigade	Cherkasy, Cherkasy Oblast	110 ОМБр	A-4007	April 10, 2022 – present	
115th Mechanized Brigade	Hlobyne, Poltava Oblast	115 ОМБр	A-4053	March 1, 2022 – present	
116th Mechanized Brigade	Kremenchuk, Poltava Oblast	116 ОМБр	A-4722	January 30, 2023 – present	
117th Heavy Mechanized Brigade	Sumy, Sumy Oblast	117 ОМБр	A-4674	January 31, 2023 – present	
118th Mechanized Brigade	Holovach, Poltava Oblast	118 ОМБр	A-4712	February 15, 2023 – present	
125th Heavy Mechanized Brigade	Lviv, Lviv Oblast	125 ОБр ТрО	A-7831	January 19, 1992 – present	Formerly Territorial Defence Forces unit.
127th Heavy Mechanized Brigade	Kharkiv, Kharkiv Oblast	127 ОБр ТрО	A-7383	January 19, 1992 – present	Formerly Territorial Defence Forces unit.
128th Mountain Assault Brigade	Mukachevo, Zakarpattia Oblast	128 ОГШБр	A-1556	January 19, 1992 – present	
128th Heavy Mechanized Brigade	Dnipro, Dnipropetrovsk Oblast	128 ОБр ТрО	A-7384	January 19, 1992 – present	Formerly Territorial Defence Forces unit.
129th Heavy Mechanized Brigade	Kryvyi Rih, Dnipropetrovsk Oblast	129 ОБр ТрО	A-4067	February 2, 2022 – present	Formerly Territorial Defence Forces unit.
141st Mechanized Brigade	Rivne Oblast	141 ОСБр	А-4808	February 15, 2023 – present	
142nd Mechanized Brigade	Krasnohrad, Kharkiv Oblast	142 ОСБр	А-4820	February 15, 2023 – present	
143rd Mechanized Brigade	Ladynka, Chernihiv Oblast	143 ОСБр	А-4844	February 15, 2023 – present	
144th Mechanized Brigade	N/A	144 ОСБр	A-4828	February 22, 2023 – present	
150th Mechanized Brigade	Volyn Oblast	150 ОМБр	A-4935	October 10, 2023 - January 1, 2025	Redesignated as 40th Coastal Defense Brigade in 2025. Transferred to Ukrainian Marine Corps.
151st Mechanized Brigade	Dnipro, Dnipropetrovsk Oblast	151 ОМБр	A-4941	August 29, 2023 – present	
152nd Jager Brigade	Pyriatyn, Poltava Oblast	152 ОЄБр	A-4948	September 13, 2023 – present	Formerly a mechanized unit, reflagged as a Jager unit in August 2024.
153rd Mechanized Brigade	N/A	153 ОМБр	A-4955	August 29, 2023 – present	In April 2024, the unit was reflagged as the 153rd Infantry Brigade. But was later reestablished as a mechanized unit in June 2024.
154th Mechanized Brigade	N/A	154 ОМБр	A-4962	September 13, 2023 – present	
155th Mechanized Brigade	Mala Lyubasha, Rivne Oblast	155 ОМБр	A-5001	March 1, 2024 – present	
156th Mechanized Brigade	Uzhhorod, Zakarpattia Oblast	156 ОМБр	A-5003	August 12, 2024 – present	
157th Mechanized Brigade	N/A	157 ОМБр	A-5006	2024–present	
158th Mechanized Brigade	Chernihiv, Chernihiv Oblast	158 ОМБр	A-5002	February 2, 2024 – present	
159th Mechanized Brigade	Pervomaisk, Mykolaiv Oblast	159 ОМБр	A-5000	March 12, 2024 – present	
160th Mechanized Brigade	Starychi, Lviv Oblast	160 ОМБр	A-4977	June 25, 2024 – present	
161st Mechanized Brigade	N/A	161 ОМБр		2024 - 2025	
162nd Mechanized Brigade	Korosten, Zhytomyr Oblast	162 ОМБр	A-4990	June 21, 2024 – present	

== Vehicular equipment ==
The Mechanized Infantry are equipped with the following vehicles:

- M55S, T-62, T-64, T-72, T-80, Leopard 1, Leopard 2, M1 Abrams, Challenger 2, PT-91 Twardy main battle tanks in armored battalions.
- AMX-10 RC wheeled light tanks/armored reconnaissance vehicles in armored battalions and reconnaissance battalions.
- FV101 Scorpion tracked light tanks/armored reconnaissance vehicles in armored battalions and reconnaissance battalions.
- BMP-1, BMP-2, BMP-3, BVP M-80, M2 Bradley, YPR-765, Pansarbandvagn 302, Marder 1 IFV, Combat Vehicle 90, BMP-1LB tracked infantry fighting vehicles in tracked mechanized infantry battalions.
- BTR-3, BTR-4, KTO Rosomak wheeled infantry fighting vehicles in wheeled mechanized infantry battalions or wheeled motorized infantry battalions.
- BTR-60, BTR-70, BTR-80, BTR Otaman 6x6, Kamaz Typhoon, Ural Typhoon, VAB, M1117, ACSV, TAB-71, Stryker, ACMAT Bastion, Patria Pasi, Pandur 1, Mbombe 6, Pegaso BMR wheeled armored personnel carriers in wheeled mechanized infantry or wheeled motorized infantry battalions.
- MT-LB, GT-MU, FV103 Spartan, FV105 Sultan, FV432, FV430 Bulldog, M113, Bandvagn 202, Bandvagn 206, BvS 10 tracked armored personnel carriers in tracked mechanized infantry battalions.
- BRDM-2, Ferret, Fennek wheeled armored scout cars, some on tank destroyer configuration.
- MT-LB-12 (TD) tracked tank destroyers.
- FV107 Scimitar tracked armored reconnaissance vehicles.
- Bushmaster, AMZ Dzik, Cougar, Mastiff, Mamba APC, International MaxxPro, BMC Kirpi, BPM-97 and Iveco LMV MRAPs in wheeled mechanized infantry battalions, wheeled motorized infantry battalions and reconnaissance battalions.
- Humvees, GAZ Tiger, Roshel Senators, Joint Light Tactical Vehicles, ATF Dingo, BATT UMG, Snatch Land Rover, Gaia Amir, MSPV Panthera T6, Mowag Eagle I, Novator, VPK-Ural armored cars and mobility vehicles in wheeled motorized infantry battalions and reconnaissance battalions.

Under development:

- BVMP-62, BVMP-64, BTMP-84 tracked heavy IFVs.
- BTRV-64 tracked heavy APC.
- BMPT-K-64 wheeled heavy APC.
