= 62nd Mechanized Brigade =

Former Ukrainian Ground Forces unit

- 62-га механізована бригада
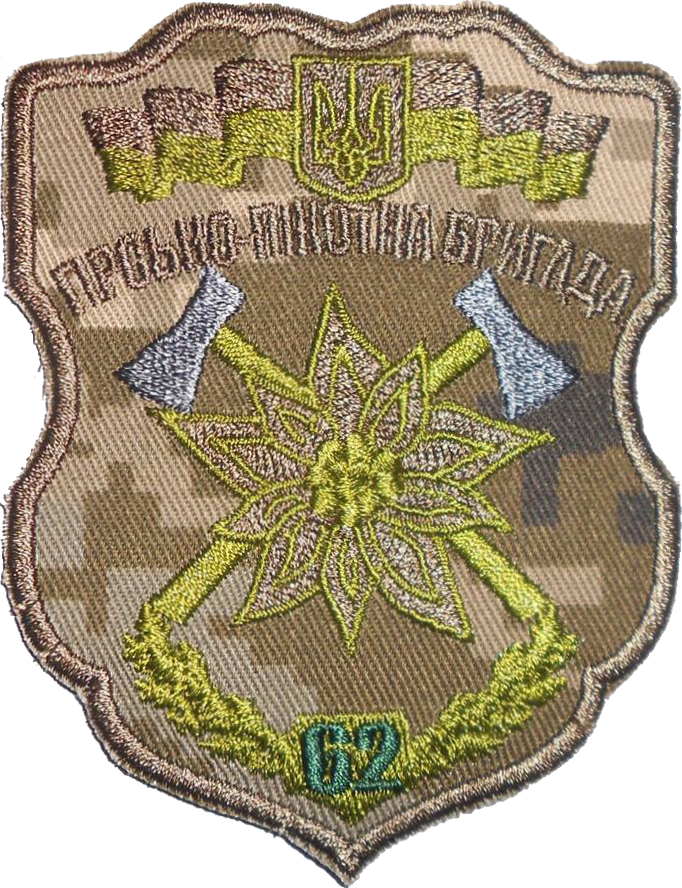
- Insignia of the brigade
- Active: 1 December 2000–2004; 2014–December 2022; Prior to September 2023–Late 2023
- Country: Ukraine
- Branch: Ukrainian Ground Forces
- Type: Brigade
- Role: Mechanized Infantry
- Size: 1,500-5,000
- Garrison/HQ: Berdychiv, Zhytomyr Oblast
- Engagements: Russo-Ukrainian War: Battle of Bakhmut; 2023 Ukrainian counteroffensive
- Website: Official Facebook page

Commanders
- Notable commanders: Lt. Col. Oleksandr Moroz

Insignia
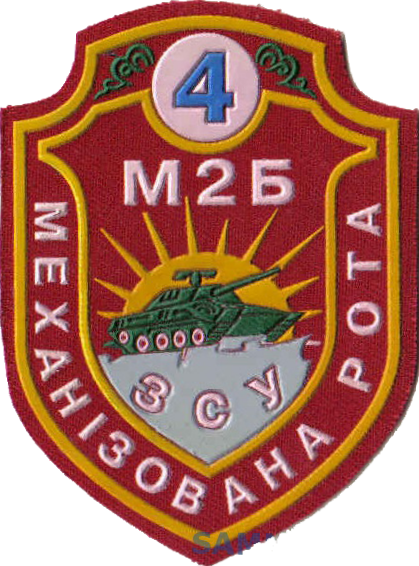
- Former sleeve patch (2000–05)

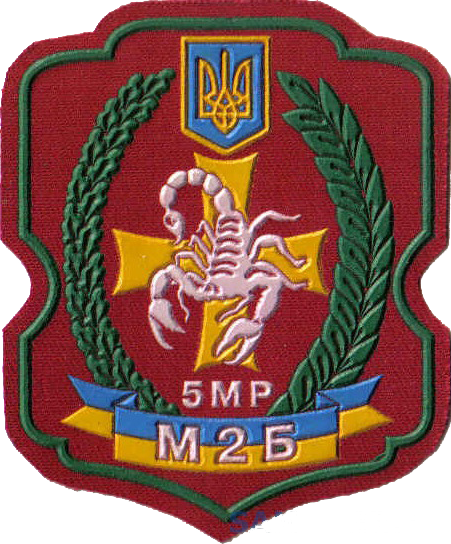
- Former insignia (2000–05)

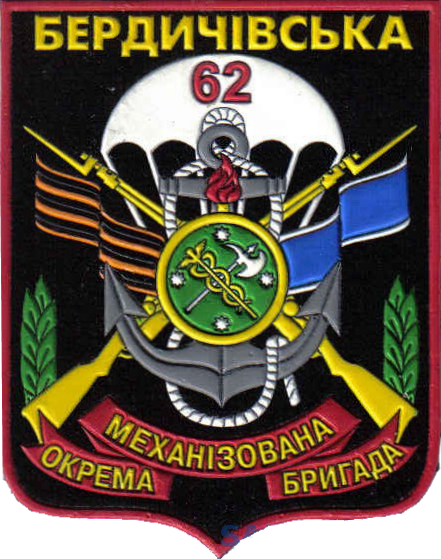
- Former sleeve patch (2005–10)

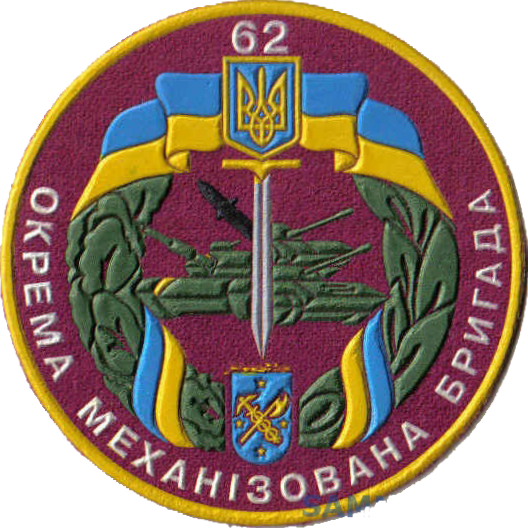
- Former insignia (2005–10)

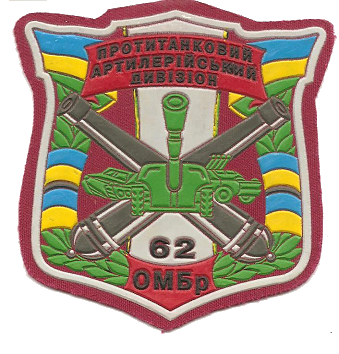
- Former sleeve patch (2010–15)

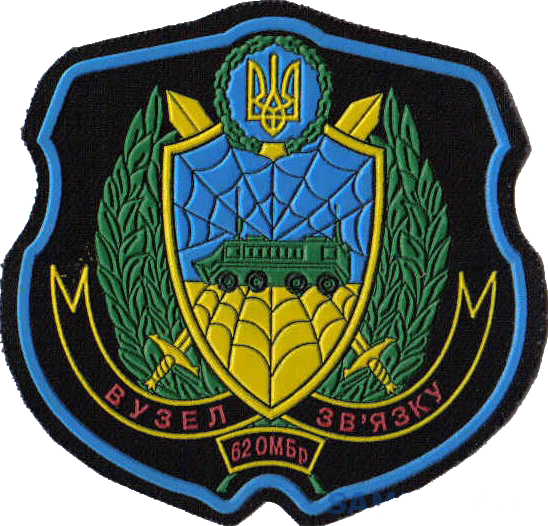
- Former insignia (2010–15)

The 62nd Separate Mechanized Brigade (Ukrainian: 62-га окрема механізована бригада) was a brigade of the Ukrainian Ground Forces.

== History ==
Originally derived from the 119th Training Center in Berdychiv, Zhytomyr Oblast, the 62nd Mechanized Brigade was a mechanized formation of the Ground Forces that was established in December 2000. The brigade was abolished in 2004 after army reforms, and its artillery group served as the basis for the 26th Artillery Brigade's first battalion.

Reestablished in 2014 in reaction to the War in Donbas, the 62nd Mechanized Brigade was fully operational by 2015. The unit was almost finished with its formation by July 2017. The professionalism and experience of the brigade's soldiers were commended by NATO observers who were present throughout the drills. Nevertheless, the brigade was later demobilized and merely existed on paper for unclear reasons.

The brigade was revived alongside other 60-series brigades in January 2022 in response to the fear of a renewed Russian invasion; however, its advancement was not as rapid as that of other reserve forces. Parts of the brigade were sent to Bakhmut by the end of 2022. The brigade was never completely reconstituted, and its soldiers were transferred to other formations as a result of the high fatalities incurred during the fierce battle there.

The 62nd Mechanized Brigade was decommissioned in 2022.

According to Business Insider, the Brigade participated in combat actions near Kupyansk in September 2023 during the 2023 Ukrainian counteroffensive. According to militaryland.net, a website which categorizes Ukrainian units that have participated in the Russo-Ukrainian War, the brigade was disbanded again in 2023.

== Structure ==
As of 2022, the brigade's structure was as following:

- 62nd Mechanized Brigade
  - Headquarters & Headquarters Company
  - 1st Mechanized Battalion
  - 2nd Mechanized Battalion
  - 3rd Mechanized Battalion
  - Tank Battalion
  - Artillery Group
  - Anti-Aircraft Defense Battalion
  - Reconnaissance Company
  - Engineer Battalion
  - Logistic Battalion
  - Signal Company
  - Maintenance Battalion
  - Radar Company
  - Medical Company
  - CBRN Protection Company
