= 117th Heavy Mechanized Brigade =

Ukrainian Ground Forces unit

117th Heavy Mechanized Brigade (2024 – present) 117th Mechanized Brigade (2023 – 2024)
- 117 окрема важка механізована бригада
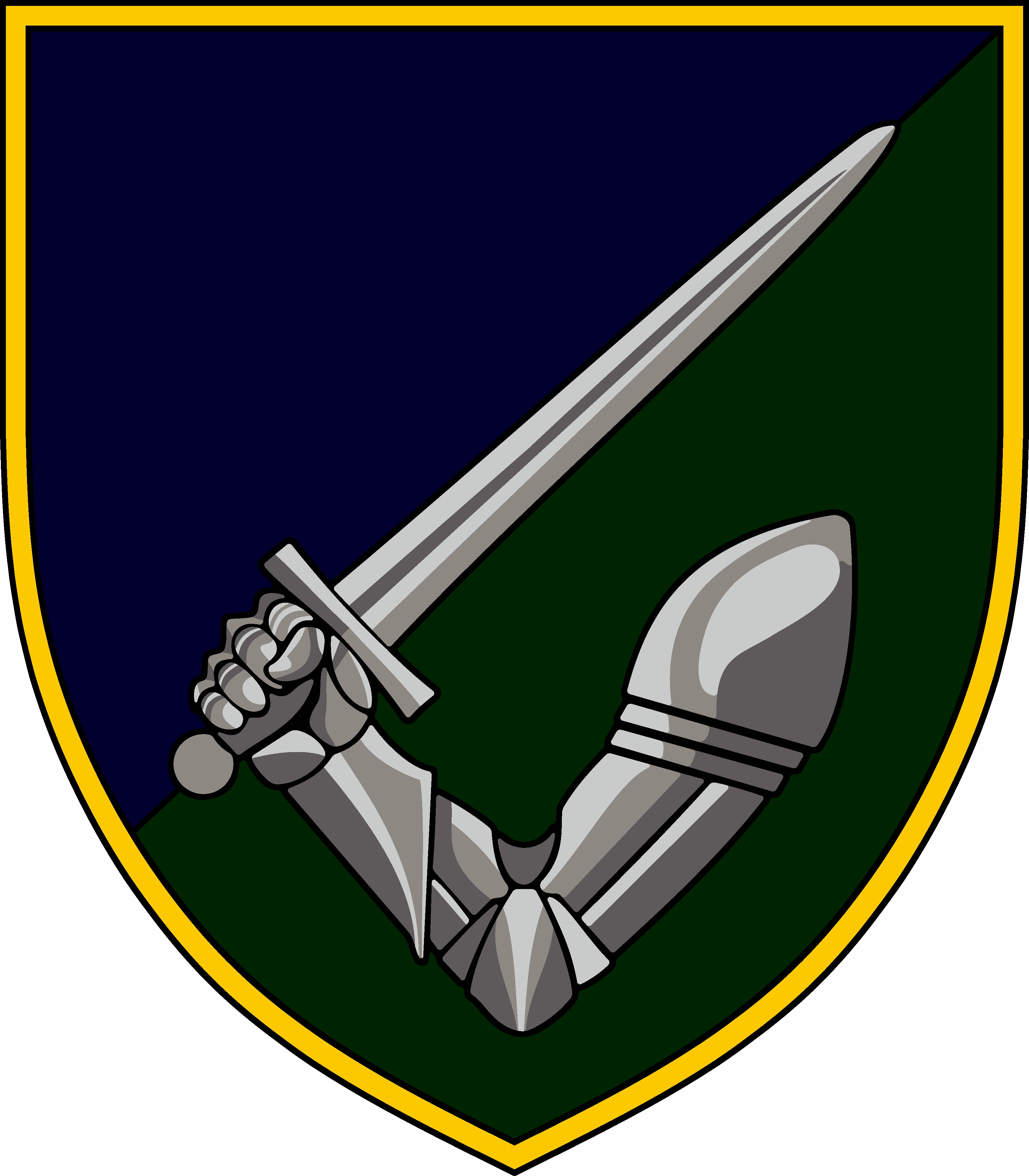
- Active: January 31, 2023 - present
- Country: Ukraine
- Allegiance: Armed Forces of Ukraine
- Branch: Ukrainian Ground Forces
- Role: Mechanized Infantry
- Size: Brigade
- Part of: Operational Command South: 19th Army Corps
- Garrison/HQ: Kremenchuk, Poltava Oblast
- Mottos: By Fire and Sword
- Engagements: Russo-Ukrainian War: Full scale invasion; 2023 Ukrainian counteroffensive; Pokrovsk offensive
- Decorations: For Courage and Bravery
- Website: Official Facebook page

Commanders
- Current commander: Colonel Dmytro Yevtushenko

The 117th Heavy Mechanized Brigade (MUN A4674) is a brigade of the Ukrainian Ground Forces formed in February 2023 based on 15th Separate Rifle Battalion.

== History ==
The brigade is at the stage of formation as of February 2023. It has been involved in the 2023 Ukrainian counteroffensive, specifically in the Melitopol sector. On August 17 2023, they were visited by Ukrainian president Volodymyr Zelenskyy.

During the Pokrovsk offensive, the brigade was tasked with defending the city of Pokrovsk. One soldier of the brigade said that Ukrainian units in the area were underequipped saying: "some units defending the city are frustrated because they aren’t getting the support they need. It’s politics, we don’t have enough shells and other supplies".

== Structure ==
As of 2023 the brigade's structure is as follows:

117th Heavy Mechanized Brigade

- Headquarters
- 1st Tank Battalion
- 2nd Mechanized Battalion
- 3rd Mechanized Battalion
- 1st Rifle Battalion
- Unmanned Systems Battalion Zvirobiy
- Artillery Group
- Anti-tank Artillery Group
- Anti-Aircraft Defense Battalion
- Reconnaissance Company
- Engineer Battalion
- Logistic Battalion
- Maintenance Battalion
- Signal Company
- Radar Company
- Medical Company
- CBRN Protection Company
