= 61st Mechanized Brigade (Ukraine) =

Ukrainian Ground Forces formation

61st Mechanized Infantry Brigade (2022–present) 61st Jager Infantry Brigade (2019–22) 61st Motorized Infantry Brigade (2015–19)
- Ukrainian: 61-ша окрема механізована єгерська бригада "Степова"
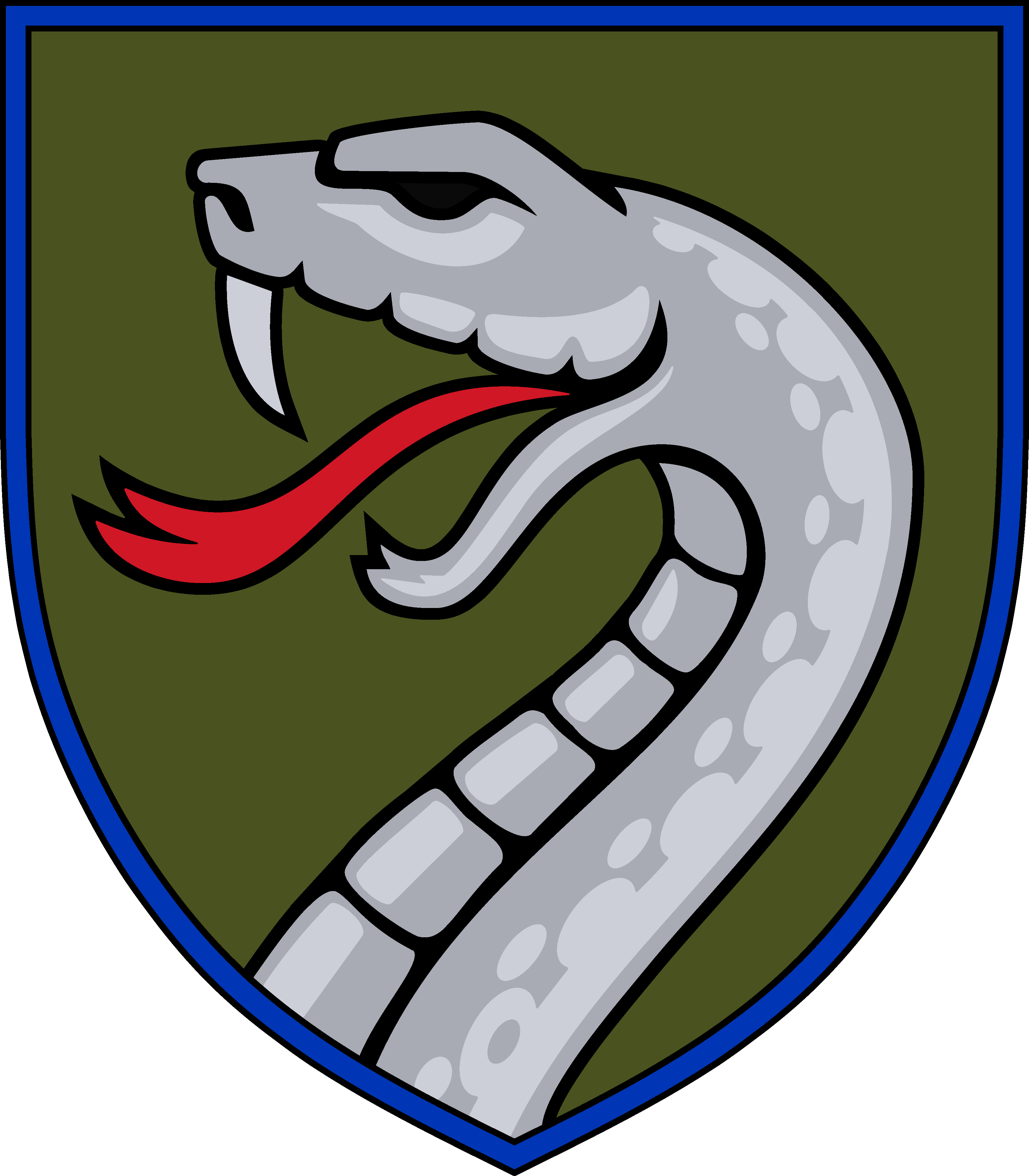
- 61st Mechanized Brigade shoulder sleeve insignia
- Active: 10 November 2015 – present
- Country: Ukraine
- Allegiance: Armed Forces of Ukraine
- Branch: Ukrainian Ground Forces
- Type: Mechanized Infantry; Light Infantry
- Size: Brigade
- Part of: Operational Command North
- Garrison/HQ: Zhytomyr, Zhytomyr Oblast
- Motto: Freedom Forever
- Engagements: Russian invasion of Ukraine

The 61st Mechanized Brigade "Stepova" (Ukrainian: 61-ша окрема механізована бригада - formerly 61st Jaeger Brigade) is a formations of the Mechanized Infantry of the Ukrainian Ground Forces, raised in 2015 as the 61st Motorized Infantry Brigade (61-ша окрема мотопіхотна бригада) of the Ukrainian Ground Forces' 4th Army Reserve Corps. Based in Zhytomyr Oblast, it was one of the Ground Forces' specialized formations, whose role was to defend the forest lands of the north as well as the swampy terrain of the Pinsk Marshes, which were in the area of responsibility (AOR) of the brigade.

== Brief history ==
The brigade was raised in 2015 first as a reserve motorized formation of the Ground Forces Command, which would later be transferred in 2017–18 as part of the 4th Army Reserve Corps, with its first brigade HQ and garrison based in Chernihiv, Chernihiv Oblast. At first, the brigade was a motorized infantry unit with its own artillery regiment and 3 battalions, each former territorial defense battalions.

On 25 April 2019, the formation, in compliance with a directive from the Ministry of Defense and the Armed Forces General Headquarters, left the reserves and was placed with its new designation as a light infantry unit under the Operational Command North in Zhytomyr, Zhytomyr Oblast. The majority of the servicemen of the brigade are personnel under contract service within the Ground Forces, many of them coming from the territory of the oblast and from the forested sectors within the brigade's AOR. They are thus equipped for forest and swamp warfare operations within its vicinity, especially in the Belarusian and Russian borders and in the swamplands of Pripyat in the north, working with personnel of the Chief Directorate of Intelligence of the Ministry of Defence of Ukraine and the Special Operations Forces, as well as the State Border Service. It is the terrain of the AOR of this brigade, which cannot be traversed by mechanized vehicles, that makes the brigade's duties all the more important in this part of Ukraine. Since parts of the AOR have had been covered by the Chernobyl excursion zone the brigade is planned to be also embarked in a specialized CBRN defense capability in the coming years.

The Jager (Ukrainian: єгерська) designation of the brigade, the first Ukrainian unit to bear this title after more than a century, is of German origin in the same-named light infantry formations of the German Army, the defunct Austro-Hungarian Army and in the former Imperial Russian Army, which stationed such units in the past in the Kyiv and Odesa Military Districts.

In 2022, the infantry brigade was mechanized from being a light motorized unit. Amongst other things, it gained RM-70 rocket-launchers from the Czech Republic. The brigade fought on the southern front of Ukraine's fall 2022 counteroffensive.

The 61st Mechanized Brigade took part in the Ukrainian operation in Russia's Kursk Oblast from 6 August 2024. On 9 August, the brigade's 99th Battalion published a video from Sudzha, claiming that the town had come under Ukrainian control. The brigade was still operating in Kursk as of February 2025.

== Organization ==
- 61st Jaeger Infantry Brigade (Mechanized), Zhytomyr
  - Headquarters & Headquarters Company, Zhytomyr
  - 99th Rifle Battalion (Mech)
  - 100th Rifle Battalion (Mech)
  - 101st Rifle Battalion (Mech)
  - 35th Rifle Battalion (Mot)
  - 61st Tank Battalion
  - 61st Brigade Field Artillery Regiment (Medium)
    - Headquarters & Target Acquisition Battery
    - 2x Self-propelled Artillery Battalion (2S1 Gvozdika/M109L)
    - Rocket Launcher Artillery Battalion (BM-21 Grad/RM-70)
    - Anti-tank Artillery Battalion (MT-12 Rapira)
  - 61st Brigade Air Defense Missile Artillery Battalion (Light)
  - Combat Engineer Battalion
  - Maintenance Battalion
  - Logistics Battalion
  - Reconnaissance Company
  - Sniper Company
  - 61st UAV Battalion
  - Electronic Warfare Company
  - Signal Company
  - Radar Company
  - CBRN-defense Company
  - Medical Company
  - MP Platoon
  - Brigade Band
