= 144th Mechanized Brigade =

- 144 Окрема Піхотна Бригада
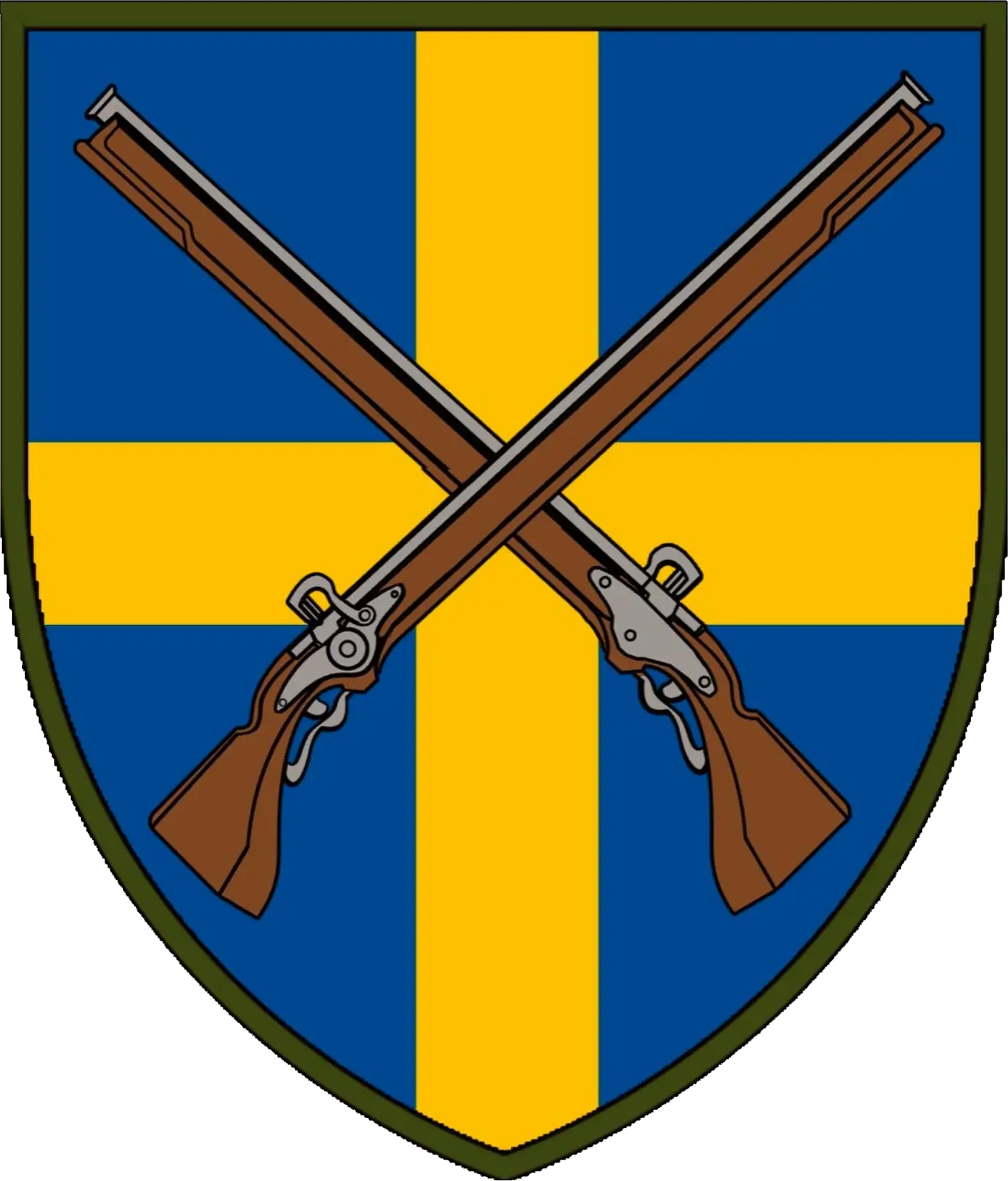
- Shoulder sleeve insignia
- Active: 22 February 2023 – present
- Country: Ukraine
- Branch: Ukrainian Ground Forces
- Type: Mechanized Infantry
- Part of: Operational Command South
- Engagements: Russo-Ukrainian War; Russian invasion of Ukraine; Pokrovsk offensive
- Website: https://www.facebook.com/144opbr

The 144th Mechanized Brigade (Ukrainian: 144 Окрема Піхотна Бригада) is a unit of the Ukrainian Ground Forces formed in 2023, originally as a Reserve Rifle Brigade. It was reformed into an infantry brigade later in 2023 and into a mechanized brigade in January 2025.

== History ==
The 144th Mechanized Brigade was formed on 22 February 2023, as part of an expansion of the Ukrainian Army reserve, bringing together rifle battalions recruited from various regions of Ukraine subordinate to Operational Command South. In January 2024, the brigade's personnel were trained in rescue and evacuation of casualties.

The brigade first saw action in June 2024, when it was deployed to the Pokrovsk sector.

== Structure ==
As of 11 December 2023 the brigade's known structure is as follows:

- 144th Mechanized Brigade
  - Headquarters & Headquarters Company
  - 408th Infantry Battalion
  - 409th Infantry Battalion (military unit A4818)
  - 410th Infantry Battalion (military unit A4828)
  - 469th Infantry Battalion (military unit A4982)
  - 472nd Infantry Battalion (military unit A4989)

== Symbols ==
The brigade's emblem consists of a golden cross on a blue field, a historical heraldic element of Eastern Podolia, where the unit is headquartered, with two crossed muskets in the middle.
