= 1st Heavy Mechanized Brigade =

Military unit

1st Heavy Mechanized Brigade (2025 – present) 1st Tank Brigade (1997 – 2025)
- 1-ша окрема танкова Сіверська бригада
- Shoulder Sleeve Insignia
- Active: August 24, 1997 – Today
- Country: Ukraine
- Branch: Ukrainian Ground Forces
- Role: Mechanized Infantry
- Part of: Operational Command North
- Garrison/HQ: Honcharivske, Chernihiv Oblast
- Engagements: Russo-Ukrainian War
- Decorations: For Courage and Bravery
- Website: https://www.facebook.com/1ogtb/

Commanders
- Current commander: Oleh Mohulskyi

The 1st Heavy Mechanized Brigade (Ukrainian: 1-ша окрема танкова Сіверська бригада) is a brigade of the Ukrainian Ground Forces formed in 1997.

== History ==
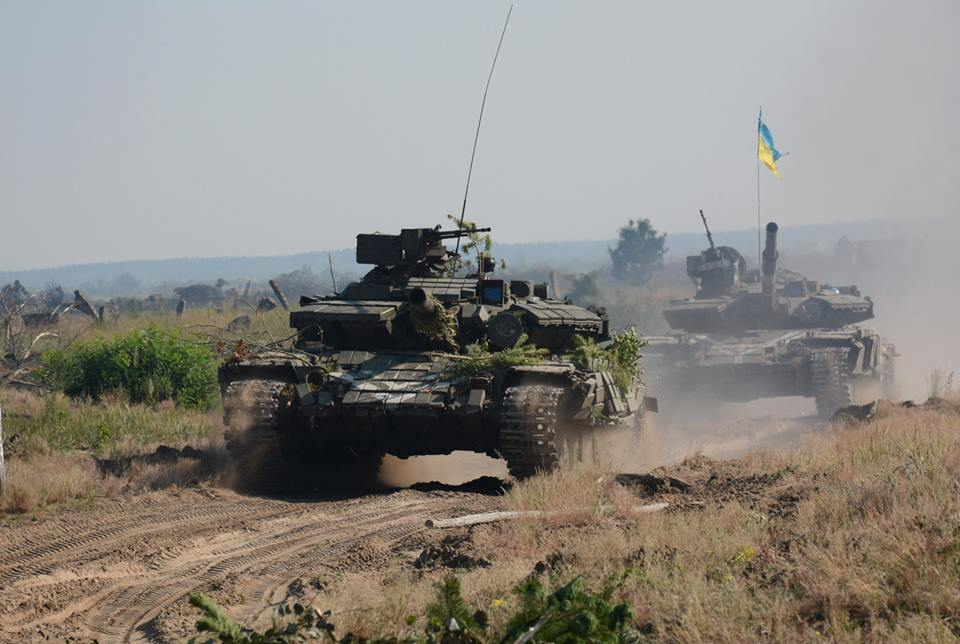
T-64BVs of the 1st Tank Brigade during training in 2016

The brigade is a unit of the Armed Forces of Ukraine that was formed in 1997 from the 292nd Tank Regiment, previously part of the 72nd Guards Mechanised Division. In 2014, the brigade was deployed to the border with Russia in the Sumy region to protect the route to Kyiv. One battalion was also sent to support mechanized brigades in the Luhansk region, mainly around Luhansk Airport. In 2015, the brigade supported the 30th Mechanized Brigade in Debaltseve, where they destroyed at least three enemy tanks.

At the onset of the 2022 Russian invasion of Ukraine, the brigade dispersed in anticipation of the imminent bombardment. Following the bombardment, the unit returned to Chernihiv to respond to Russian vanguard forces. Russian forces attempted to take the city, but were repelled. However, they eventually bypassed the city, resulting in the siege of Chernihiv. Despite encirclement, the brigade maintained one supply route for communications and resupply. By 31 March 2022, the brigade had successfully defended the city against Russian attacks and the siege was lifted. Surviving elements of the Russian 41st Combined Arms Army retreated north to Belarus.

The brigade recaptured surrounding Ukrainian towns and the M01 Highway connecting to Kyiv. Following rest and refit in May, elements of the brigade were deployed back to the battle of Donbas in the area of southern Donetsk and Kramatorsk. For its service in Chernihiv, the southern counteroffensive, and the Donbas region, the unit was awarded the recently established honorary award of "For Courage and Bravery" by Ukrainian President Volodymyr Zelenskyy. Zelenskyy also stated that in six months, more than a thousand personnel of this brigade were awarded state awards.

In October 2023, it was reported that elements of the brigade, including its mechanized battalion, were operating near the villages of Novokalynove and Krasnohorivka (since renamed Yasnohorivka), in the Donetsk Oblast, amid a Russian offensive in the area aimed at capturing Avdiivka.

In August 2024, after four years as brigade commander, Col. Leonid Khoda resigned from his position, and Lt. Col. Oleh Mohulskyi took his place. In a farewell statement to his soldiers, Khoda said that the brigade had taken part in combat operations at Lyman, Lysychansk, Avdiivka, Maryinka, Staromaiorske and Robotyne.

In July 2025, the brigade was reformed into the 1st Heavy Mechanized Brigade.

== Structure ==
As of 2025, the brigade's structure is as follows:

- 1st Heavy Mechanized Brigade, Honcharivske, Chernihiv Oblast
  - Headquarters & Headquarters Company
  - 1st Tank Battalion
  - 2nd Tank Battalion
  - 3rd Tank Battalion
  - 4th Tank Battalion
  - 1st Mechanized Battalion
  - 1st Rifle Battalion
  - 2nd Rifle Battalion "OUN"
  - Artillery Group
    - Headquarters and Target Acquisition Battery
    - 1st Self-propelled Artillery Battalion (2S1 Gvozdika)
    - 2nd Self-propelled Artillery Battalion (2S3 Akatsiya)
    - Rocket Artillery Battalion (BM-21 Grad)
    - Anti-Tank Artillery Battalion
  - Anti-Aircraft Defense Battalion
  - Reconnaissance Company
  - Attack Drone Company "Pegasus"
    - FPV Drone Group "Tuman"
    - FPV Drone Group "Bora"
    - Drone Group "Predator"
  - Engineer Battalion
  - Logistic Battalion
  - Maintenance Battalion
  - Signal Company
  - Radar Company
  - Medical Company
  - Chemical, Biological, Radiological and Nuclear Defense Company
