= 151st Mechanized Brigade =

Ukrainian Ground Forces unit

- 151 окрема механізована бригада 151 okrema mekhanizovana bryhada
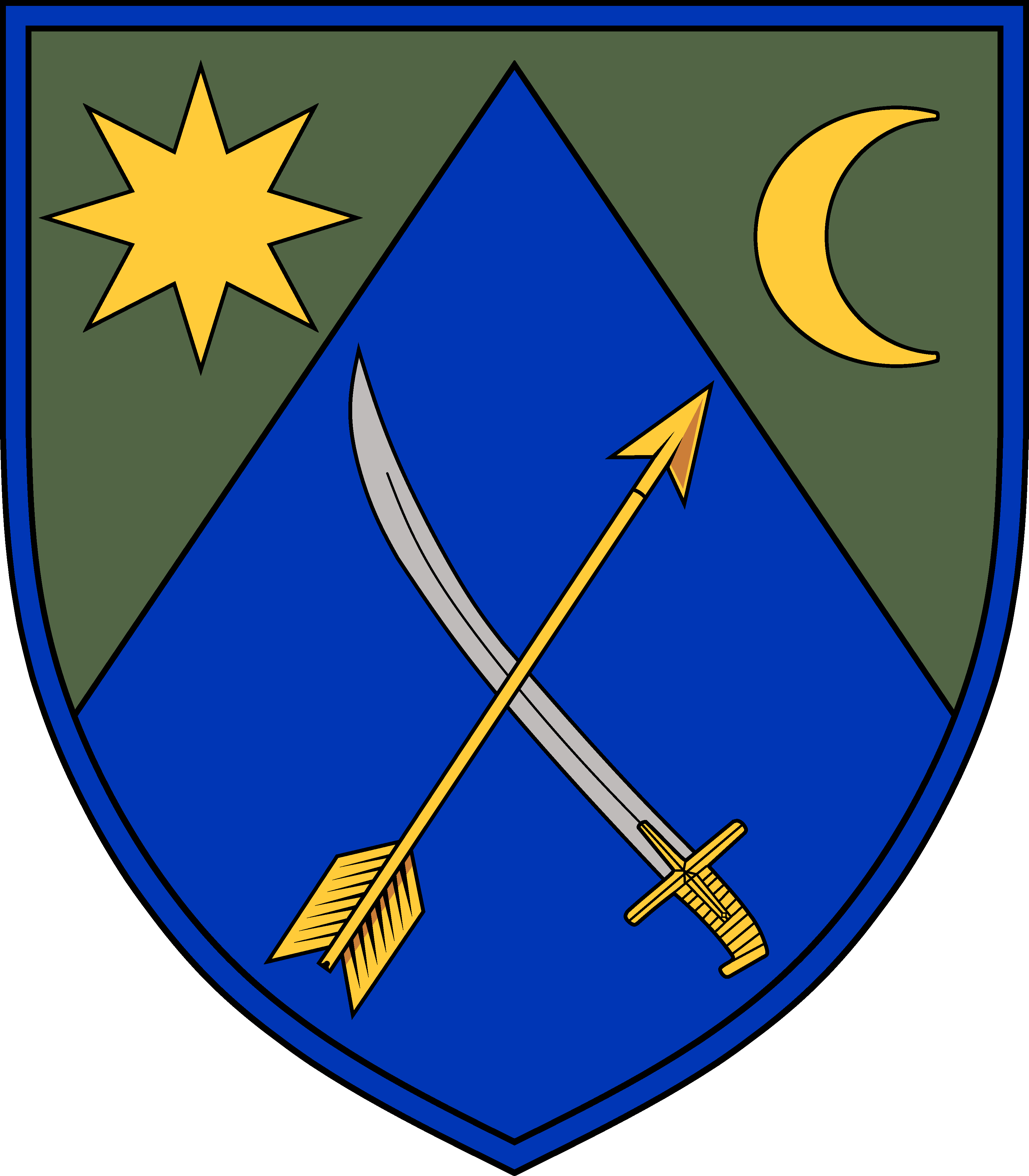
- Shoulder sleeve insignia
- Active: August 29, 2023 – present
- Country: Ukraine
- Branch: Ukrainian Ground Forces
- Type: Mechanized Infantry
- Size: Brigade
- Part of: Operational Command East
- Garrison/HQ: Dnipro, Dnipro Oblast
- Motto: "The Future is Ours"
- Engagements: Russo-Ukrainian war; Russian invasion of Ukraine; Eastern Ukraine campaign; Pokrovsk offensive
- Website: Official Facebook page

Commanders
- Current commander: Vadym Samoilenko

Insignia
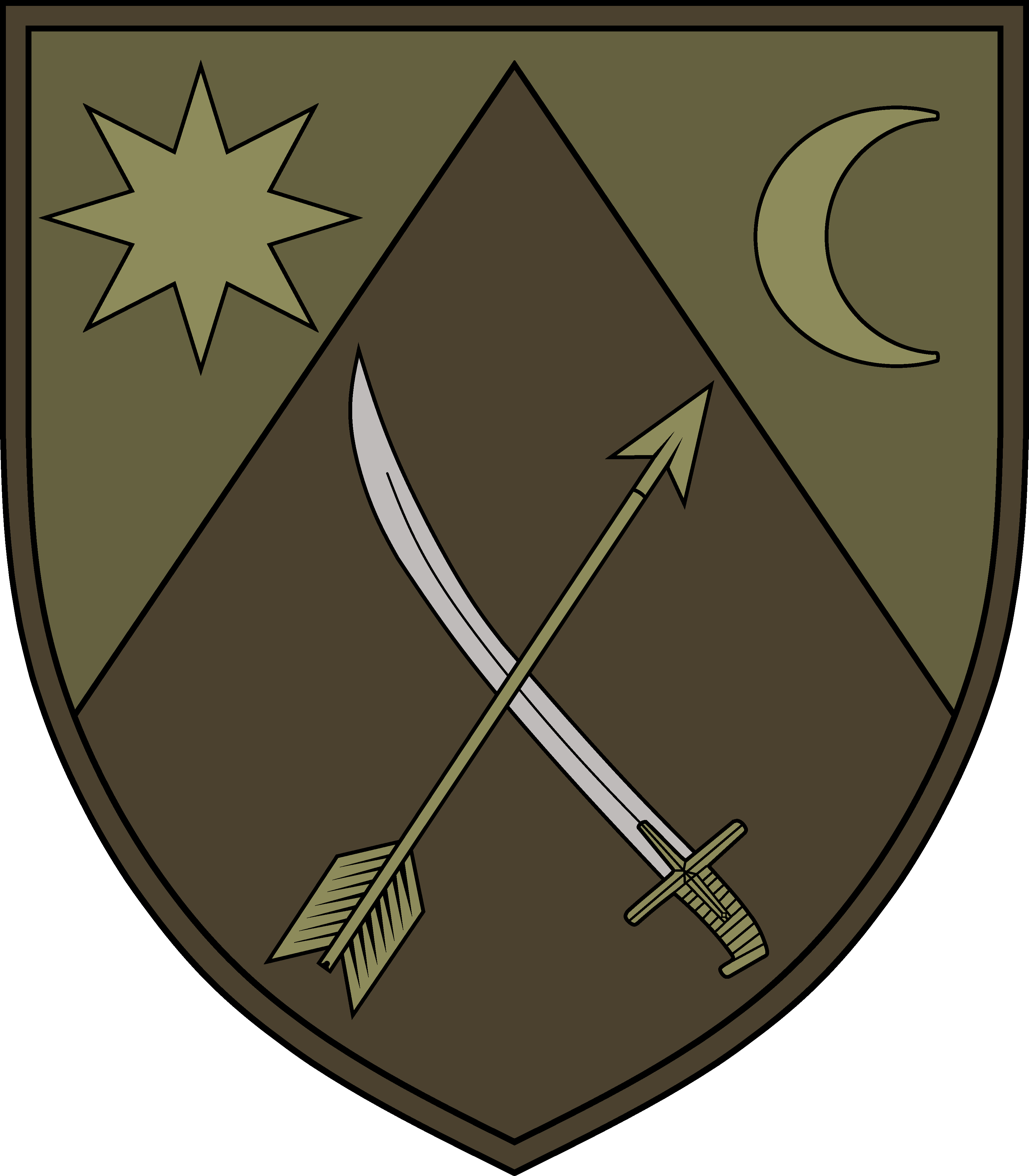
- Field Insignia

The 151st Mechanized Brigade (Ukrainian: 151 окрема механізована бригада, romanized: 151 okrema mekhanizovana bryhada), is a formation of the Ukrainian Ground Forces formed in 2023. It was part of the creation of four other brigades to expand the Ukrainian Ground Forces in response to the 2022 Russian Invasion of Ukraine and is expected to participate in a potential Ukrainian counteroffensive in 2024.

== History ==
=== Formation ===
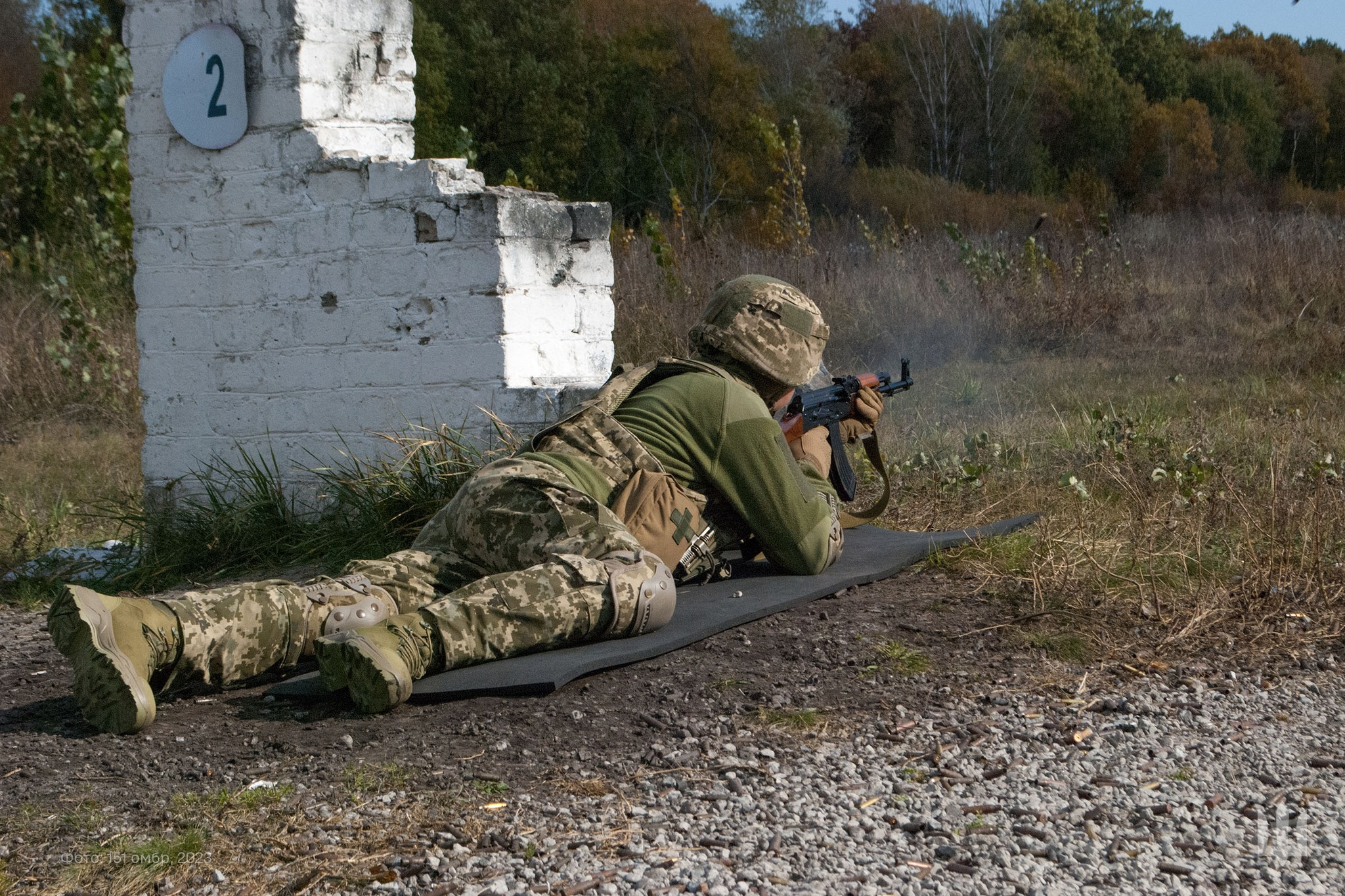
Soldier of the brigade undergoing small arms practice.

The brigade was announced in mid-October 2023, alongside the creation of five new mechanized brigades as part of the Ukrainian Ground Forces, accounting for a five percent expansion of the Ground Forces.

The brigade reportedly drew its cadre of experienced officers and non-commissioned officers from existing brigades that have already served on the frontline in Ukraine. It was also mentioned that the brigade's strength will be filled with 2,000 new recruits. The brigade's purpose was expected to help participate in a Ukrainian counteroffensive in 2024, or possibly against a Russian offensive.

According to Forbes, it is unclear where the brigade will receive its equipment that makes them a mechanized brigade; rather than a glorified infantry or motorized brigade. It was noted that the new brigades may not receive new, modern vehicles but would have to make do with old, vulnerable, Soviet-era equipment.

=== Insignia ===
In October 2023, the insignia for the brigade was finally publicised alongside other information such as the motto and the brigade's official creation. The brigade insignia features a shield with a blue border, and a triangular shape inserted in the center of the insignia splitting off two small corners of the shield into a subdued green. The upper left corner of the insignia contains an eight-pointed star in a golden colour, the right corner displaying a golden crescent. The center of the insignia shows a saber and an arrow.

According to the brigade, the colours of the shield represent the colour "steppe", belonging to the colours of the Ukrainian Ground Forces. The star and crescent in a golden colour relate to the solar symbolism of the Cossack, the heirs of which are "modern warriors". The reverse-up blue tip in the center of the insignia represents the main strike on the military map, a symbol of striving for the top and victories; with the blue representing the colour for mechanized troops. The saber and arrow are elements of the coats of arm of Kodak Palanka, the historical administrative-territorial unit of the Zaporozhye Army, they are also present on the city of Dnipro's coat of arms.

== Equipment ==
=== Small arms ===
Alongside other brigades created alongside it, the brigade uses many small arms. The brigade has been seen to use mainly the Kalashnikov rifle series, specifically the AKM which has been seen with various attachments such as red dot sights, magnifiers, improved butt stocks, and better hand guards equipped with picatinny rails to improve modularity for the user. Furthermore, PBS-1 suppressors have been seen in use by the brigade itself.

As of August 2024, the brigade utilizes the following small arms:

- AKM – Soviet/Russian assault rifle
- Colt Canada C7 and C8 – Canadian made assault rifle

=== Vehicles ===
In media published by the brigade, several Soviet-era vehicles such as the BMP-2 have been spotted, seeing small usage within the brigade. The unit is known to have at least a single 2S1 Gvozdika in service, being seen in December 2023.

The brigade also have been seen using American made Humvee vehicles, seen during combat operations by the brigade on the outskirts of Hrodivka in August 2024.

As of August 2024, the brigade operates the following vehicles:

- Humvee – American high mobility multipurpose wheeled vehicle
- BMP-2 – Soviet amphibious tracked infantry fighting vehicle
- 2S1 Gvozdika – Soviet self-propelled howitzer vehicle

== Russo-Ukrainian War ==
=== Russian invasion of Ukraine ===
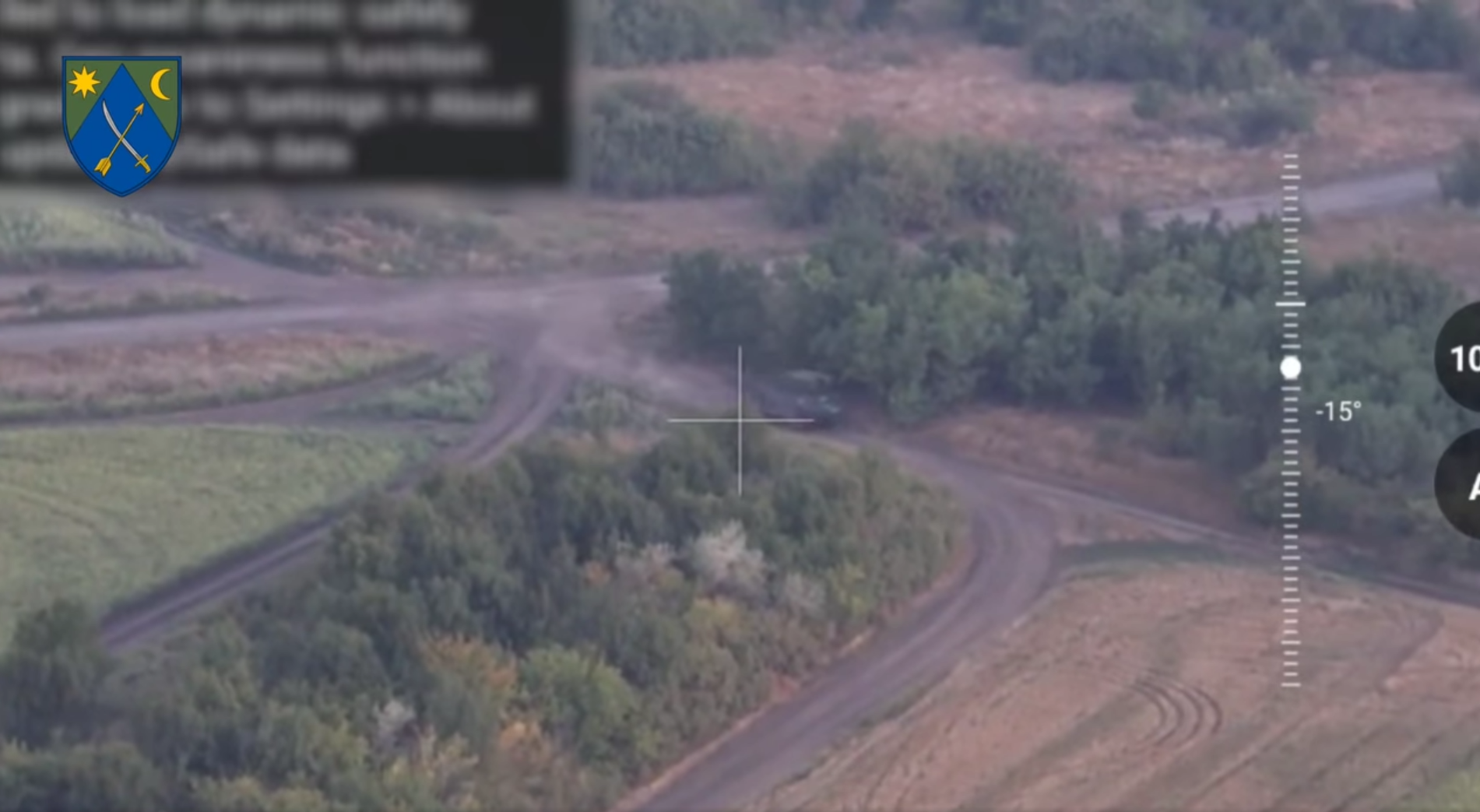
The brigade in combat operations on the outskirts of Hrodivka, 21 August 2024.

The brigade was reported to be formed in anticipation of a potential Ukrainian counteroffensive in 2024, as well as to bolster Ukrainian defenses in eastern Ukraine to relieve depleted units deployed there.

The brigade had been known to have been deployed somewhere in eastern Ukraine by at least 23 July 2024, where it showcased footage of FPV drone attacks against Russian infantry in entrenched positions.

=== Pokrovsk offensive ===
In mid to late August 2024, the brigade had publicized material indicating that it had been deployed towards the Hrodivka direction in eastern Ukraine, participating in the actions to combat the Russian Pokrovsk offensive. The brigade on 20 August 2024 published a video showing drone footage of houses on fire with Russian troops inside, alongside Russian equipment being destroyed. The brigade on 21 August 2024 uploaded more footage of an American made Humvee belonging to the brigade, assaulting a tree line accompanied by drone support against Russian infantry on the outskirts of Hrodivka.

== Structure ==
As of October 2023, the brigade's structure is as follows:

- 151st Mechanized Brigade
  - Brigade's Headquarters
  - 1st Mechanized Battalion
  - 2nd Mechanized Battalion
  - 3rd Mechanized Battalion
  - Tank Battalion
  - Reconnaissance Company
  - Artillery Group
  - Anti-Aircraft Defense Battalion
  - Engineer Battalion
  - Logistic Battalion
  - Maintenance Battalion
  - Chemical, biological, radiological, and nuclear Protection Company
  - Medical Company
  - Radar Company
  - Signal Company
