= Starychi =

Starychi Старичі
- Village
- Location of Starychi in Lviv Oblast Location of Starychi in Ukraine
- Coordinates: 49°58′38″N 23°33′24″E
- Country: Ukraine
- Oblast: Lviv Oblast
- Raion: Yavoriv Raion
- Time zone: UTC+2 (EET)
  - Summer (DST): UTC+3 (EEST)

Starychi (Ukrainian: Старичі) is a village in western Ukraine, specifically in Yavoriv Raion of Lviv Oblast. It has an area of 1.06 km^{2}, a population of 3,443 as of the 2001 census, a population density of 3,248 (per km^{2}), and an elevation of 273 m.
