= 2S43 Malva =

Russian 152 mm self-propelled howitzer

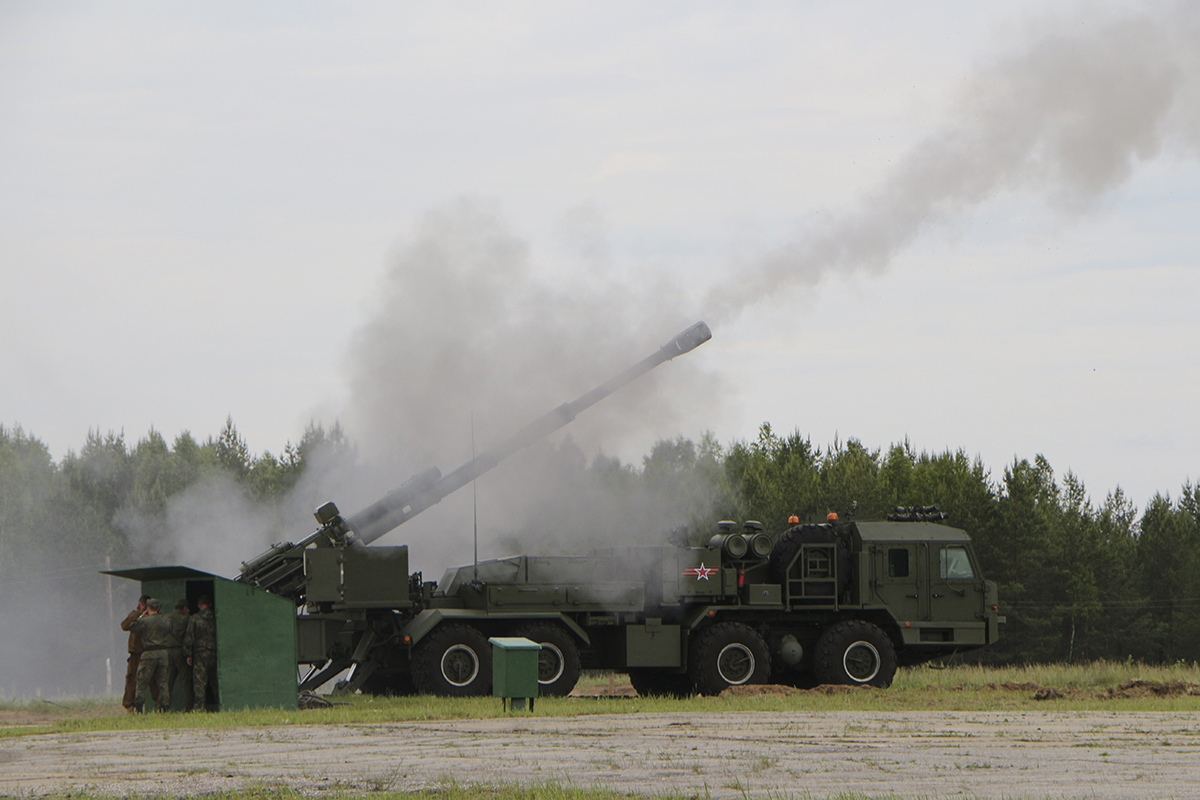
- Type: Self-propelled howitzer

Service history
- In service: 2023–present
- Used by: Russian Federation

Production history
- Designer: TsNII "Burevestnik"
- Designed: 2019–2023
- Manufacturer: Uraltransmash
- No. built: 20+

Specifications
- Mass: 32 tons
- Length: 13 m
- Width: 2.75 m
- Height: 3.1 m
- Crew: 5
- Elevation: −3° to +70°
- Traverse: 30°
- Rate of fire: 7 rounds per minute
- Effective firing range: 24.5 km(2A64) or 50 km+ (ZOF95 Krasnopol-M2)
- Armor: unknown
- Main armament: 152 mm 2A64 or 2A88
- Secondary armament: none
- Engine: Diesel YaMZ-8424.10; 470 hp
- Suspension: Hydraulic ?
- Operational range: 1000 km
- Maximum speed: 80 km/ h

The 2S43 "Malva" (in Russian: 2С43 Мальва, Malva referring to the flower) is a 152 mm Russian self-propelled gun mounted on an 8x8 wheeled chassis.

== Development ==
The 2S43 Malva was developed by the central institute of research Burevestnik based in Nizhny Novgorod. The development of the system was done in the context of the Nabrosok program, which is supposed to develop an entirely new range of artillery systems for the Russian armed forces.

The main innovation of the project is the use of an AWD wheeled chassis of eight wheels. This increases the mobility and lowers the mass, but with an unchanged combat ability. Wheeled chassis are also less expensive to exploit and produce. It is produced by Uraltransmash, a branch of Uralvagonzavod. The chassis, BAZ-6610-02 "Voshchina" is produced by the Bryansk Automobile Plant.

In 2021, the technical and tactical exigencies were fixed, in anticipation of future tests. These tests began in 2021 and ended on 17 May 2023.

On 26 October 2023, the first batch of Malva howitzers was reported to be delivered to the army. The second batch was reportedly delivered in June 2024. Deliveries reportedly continue since July 2024. Supplies of a new version codenamed 2S44 Giatsint-K reportedly begun in December 2024.

=== Deployment in Ukraine ===
On June 2, 2024, an aerial image of the 2S43 surfaced showing the vehicle's deployment to a firing position in the Kharkiv region in Ukraine as part of the ongoing Russian invasion of Ukraine. While the image is confirmed to be a 2S43, there is very little information available regarding how many are on the front or their uses.

The gun is in service with the artillery division of the 238th Separate Artillery Brigade of the Russian Armed Forces, firing OF59 long-range shells (Kursk Region). As of August 2025, the open source intelligence website Oryx has reported that at least one Malva had been destroyed or damaged during the Russian invasion of Ukraine.

== Description ==
The 2S43 "Malva" possesses a 152 mm 2A64 cannon, with a 30 rounds ammunition storage. It has an effective range of 24.5 km, a gun elevation of +70°, depression of -3° and azimuth of $\pm$30°. Other reports say that the 2S43 could be equipped with the 2A88 cannon which is used by the 2S35 Koalitsiya-SV. It has cabin armor to be protected against small arms and shrapnel. With an operational mass of 32 tons, the 2S43 is much more mobile than other self-propelled guns like the 42-ton 2S19 Msta or other tracked self-propelled artillery.

== Operators ==
- Russia:
  - Russian Ground Forces
  - Russian National Guard

== See also ==
- A-222 Bereg
