= Giatsint =

Giatsint (Russian: Гиацинт) may refer to:

- Transliteration of the Russian word for hyacinth
- 2A36 Giatsint-B, Soviet/Russian 152 mm towed artillery
- 2S5 Giatsint-S, Soviet/Russian 152 mm self-propelled artillery
