= Flying Skull Battalion (Ukraine) =

- Ukrainian: Батальйон «Flying Skull» Сил Безпілотних Систем ЗСУ
- Insignia
- Active: February 2022–present
- Country: Ukraine
- Branch: Unmanned Systems Forces
- Type: Drone warfare
- Role: Aerial Reconnaissance, FPV drone strikes, Ground Drones, Cargo Transport
- Size: Battalion
- Engagements: Russo-Ukrainian war; 2022 Russian invasion of Ukraine

The Flying Skull Battalion is a battalion level military unit of the Unmanned Systems Forces of the Armed Forces of Ukraine.

The Battalion was established in 2023 and has seen combat in the aftermath of the Russian invasion of Ukraine. It conducts drone warfare using both unmanned aerial vehicles (UAV) and unmanned ground vehicles (UGV).

== History ==
In November 2023, the unit engaged Russian forces on the frontlines. On 23 August 2024, it released a video showing the destruction of several Russian vehicles, personnel and equipment. On 4 December 2024, it destroyed Russian Pion 203-mm self-propelled artillery and 9K33M3 Osa-AKM SAM systems by directing artillery and HIMARS strikes using Ukrspecsystems Shark drones in Kherson Oblast. On 31 January 2025, it destroyed a Russian BM-21 Grad. In early February 2025, it destroyed a Russian 2S43 Malva self propelled artillery, an excavation tractor and 15 Molniya-2 UAVs on ground. On 10 March 2025, it destroyed a Russian T-80 tank, BMP-2, BTR-80, Tigr-M and a tank transporter. On 18 March 2025, it foiled a Russian assault as part of the Pokrovsk offensive by destroying two Russian T-72 tanks. In April 2025, it was "hunting" Russian personnel. In May 2025, it was engaged in action in Donetsk Oblast. On 5 July 2025, its forces detected a major Russian ammunition depot and related the coordinates to the Ukrainian Air Force which destroyed it using MiG-29 aircraft.

== Structure ==
- Zagrawa
- Topolya

== Equipment ==
- DJI Mavic 3T
- Vampire
