= Burevestnik Central Scientific Research Institute =

Company based in Nizhniy Novgorod, Russia

- Company type: Open Joint Stock Company
- Industry: Arms industry
- Headquarters: Nizhniy Novgorod, Russia
- Products: Artillery, Howitzers, Self-propelled artillery, Naval artillery, Mortars, Remote weapon stations, Turrets, Autocannons, Armored vehicles
- Parent: Uralvagonzavod
- Website: burevestnik.com

JSC CRI Central Scientific Research Institute Burevestnik (Russian: Центральный научно-исследовательский институт «Буревестник») is a Russian arms industry company based in Nizhniy Novgorod, Russia. It is part of Uralvagonzavod.

Burevestnik is a major designer of artillery systems. Seventy percent of Burevestnik's work reportedly is now civil, with priority interest in the fields of ecology, agriculture, and the processing and preservation of agricultural produce. Burevestnik designed the 2S35 Koalitsiya-SV self-propelled gun, first unveiled during the 2015 Moscow Victory Day Parade. Burevestnik also designed the 2S39 Magnolia, a self-propelled artillery gun, which uses the DT-30 Vityaz chassis.
