= 2S39 Magnolia =

Russian mortar system

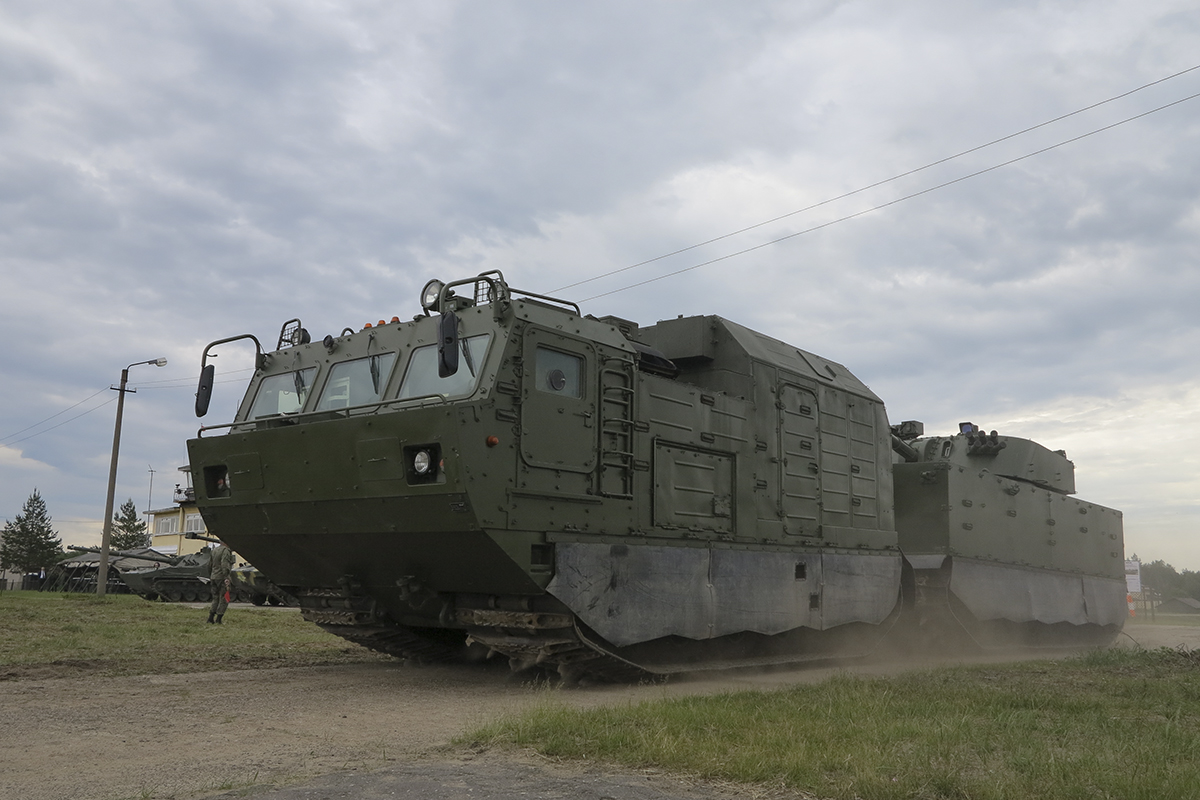
- 2S39 Magnolia. Articulated design can clearly be seen
- Type: Self-propelled mortar
- Place of origin: Russian Federation

Production history
- Designer: Burevestnik
- Manufacturer: Uralvagonzavod
- Produced: 2022-present

Specifications
- Mass: 27.5 tons unloaded, 10 tons ammo
- Crew: 4
- Caliber: 120mm
- Carriage: DT-30PM
- Elevation: -5° to +80°
- Traverse: 360°
- Rate of fire: 2 (min.) - 10 (max.)
- Maximum firing range: 10 km (shells), 7 km (mines)
- Engine: YaMZ-847-10; 800 hp
- Payload capacity: 30 tons, 80 rounds
- Operational range: 700 km (fuel range)
- Maximum speed: 44 km/h on asphalt, 5 km/h on water, unknown on unpaved

2S39 "Magnolia" (Russian: 2С39 «Магнолия»; "Magnolia") is a Russian self-propelled 120 mm mortar system developed for the Russian Armed Forces by Burevestnik. TASS first reported on the project in November 2017. Magnolia was developed for units deployed in the Far North. It is being built on the basis of the DT-30PM articulated tracked vehicle.

== Development ==
Magnolia was developed as part of the "Nabrosok" program. In 2021 it was reported that state trials for the system would end in 2022. In August 2022 Uralvagonzavod reported that it started serial production of the Magnolia system.

== Description ==
The vehicle is built on the chassis of the DT-30PM tracked vehicle, consisting of two sections connected by a joint. The first section of the vehicle has an armored cabin for the crew and an engine compartment with a YaMZ-847-10 turbocharged diesel engine with a power of 800 hp., connected to a four-speed gearbox with a locking differential. Additionally, the engine system is equipped with a pre-heater, allowing it to be started at temperatures as low as −50 °C.

The second section of the vehicle has a turret with a 120 mm mortar, the same as the one used on the 2S9 Nona vehicles. The weapon is actually a hybrid of a howitzer and a mortar being an unconventional design that lacks a direct NATO counterpart. It is compatible with mortar ammunition, both from the Soviet era and later Russian ammunition - including HE and smoke ammunition. For precision attacks against armored targets it uses the Kitolov-2M precision guided munitions. The vehicle carries a maximum of 80 rounds of ammunition, and its effective range of 7 to 10 km depends on the type used. For self-defense, a 7.62 mm machine gun is additionally mounted on the turret.
