= GMZ-3 =

Soviet minelaying vehicle

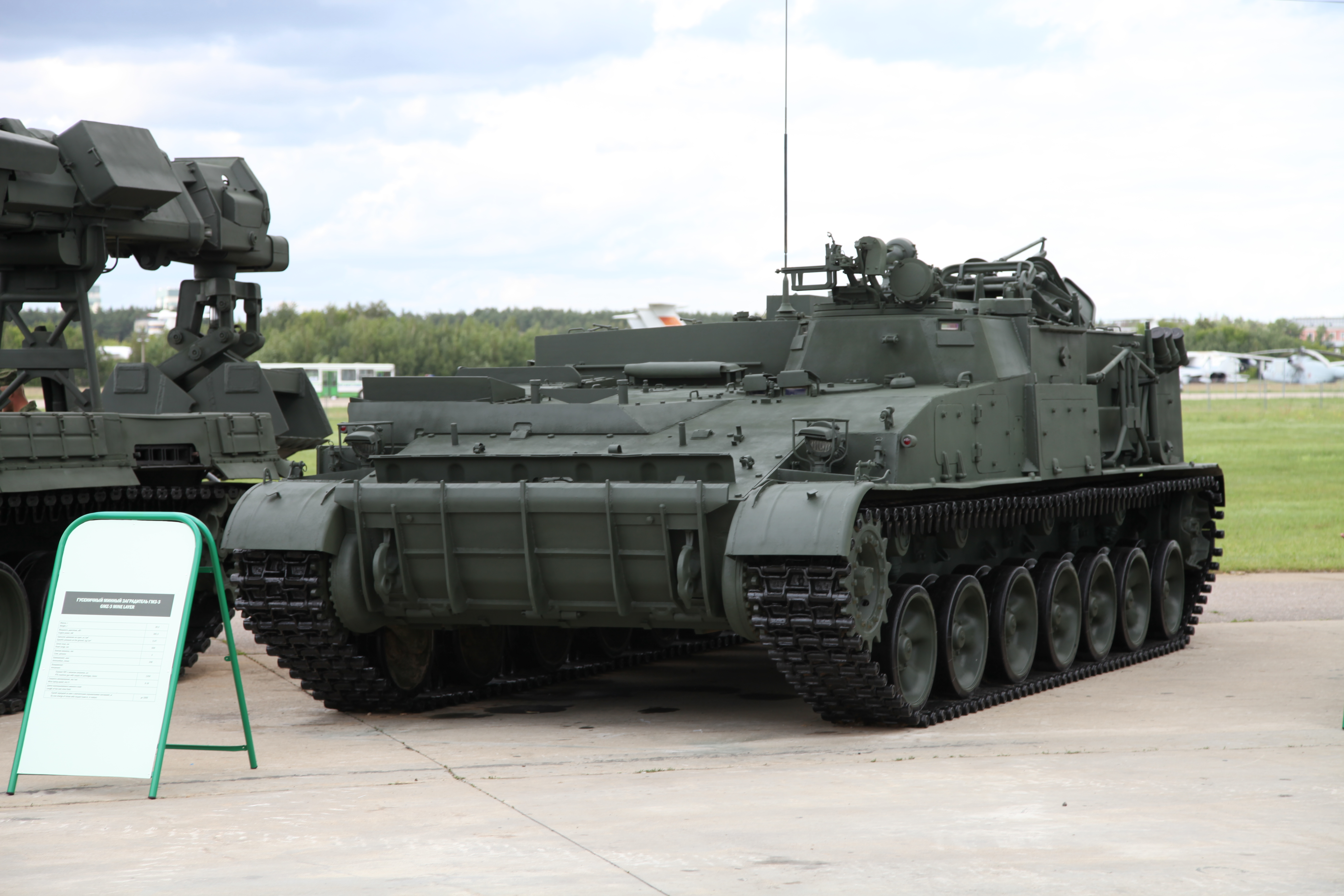
- GMZ-3 Minelayer
- Type: Armoured minelayer
- Place of origin: Soviet Union

Service history
- Used by: See Operators
- Wars: Russo-Ukrainian war

Production history
- Manufacturer: Uraltransmash Federal State Unitary Enterprise

Specifications
- Mass: 28.5 tonnes
- Length: 8.62m
- Width: 3.25m
- Height: 2.70m
- Crew: 3

The GMZ-3 (Russian: ГМЗ-3, Russian: Гусеничный минный заградитель-3, romanized: Gusenichnyi minnyi zagraditel-3 or "Tracked Minelayer-3") is an armoured minelaying vehicle developed for the Engineering Forces of the Soviet Armed Forces. Since the dissolution of the Soviet Union in 1991, it has seen service in several successor states.

== History ==
The GMZ vehicle type was introduced in the USSR as early as 1968.

== Description ==
The GMZ-3 is a tracked minelayer on a GM chassis. The third model was adopted by the USSR Armed Forces in 1984, and is designed for mechanized anti-tank mining during battle. The placement of mines is carried out on the surface of the ground without camouflage or in the ground with camouflage. It has a payload capacity of 208 mines.

== Setting up the minefield ==
During the establishment of the minefield, cassettes holding four mines of the TM-52, TM-57, TM-62, TM-62PZ or TM-89 types with contact and proximity fuses are fed to the issuing mechanism and further on a release conveyor with a mechanism for transferring mines to a firing position. The plow device with reversed discharges makes it possible to bury and mask mines.

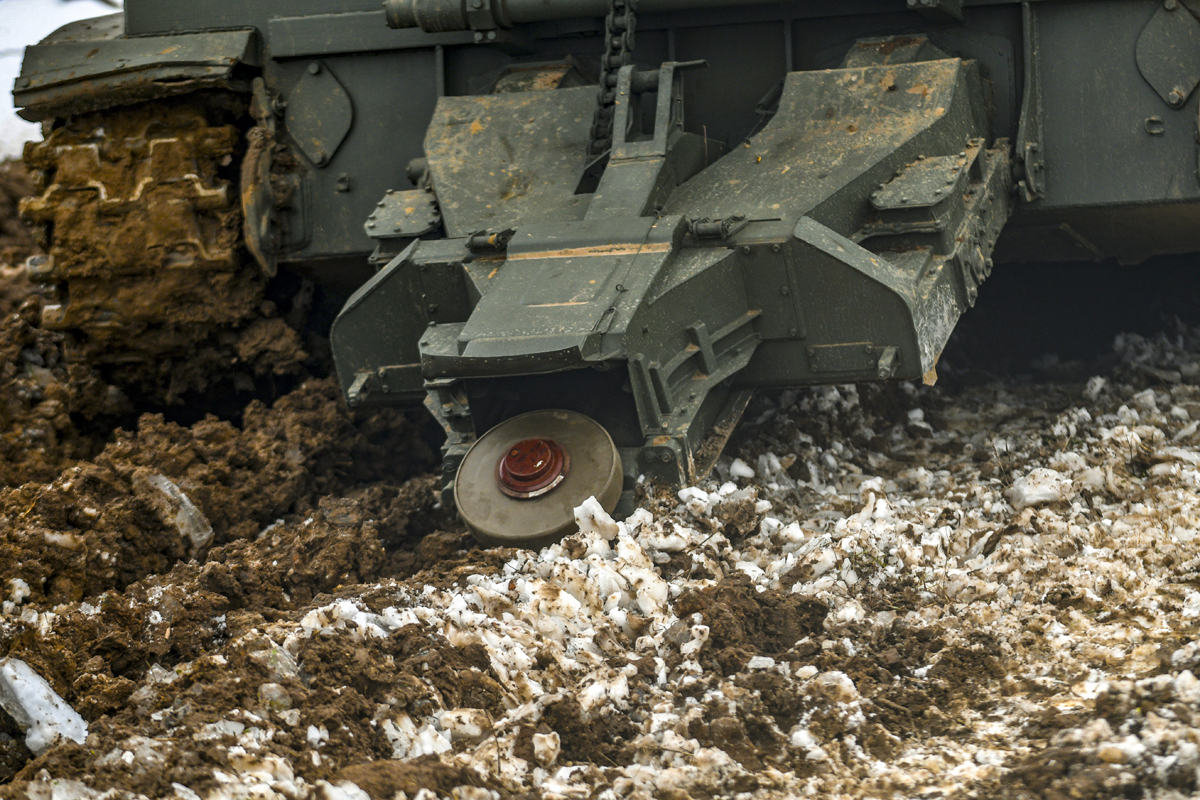
Demonstration of mine deployment from the rear of the vehicle

The GMZ-3 provides for the advance installation of minefields in danger zones for tanks, as well as defending against attacks from tanks and mechanized units.

== Sub variant ==
=== BTRG-127 Bumblebee ===
Transnistria inherited at least eight GMZ-3s from the Soviet Army. As there was no need for a minelayer, several of these vehicles were converted into armoured personnel carriers, which were first revealed in 2015. The minelaying equipment was removed and infantry seating installed, and an additional weapon station were added to the roof. The weapon station is normally fitted with a Afanasev A-12.7 12.7 mm aircraft machine gun. It is believed to have room for 8–10 soldiers.

== Operators ==
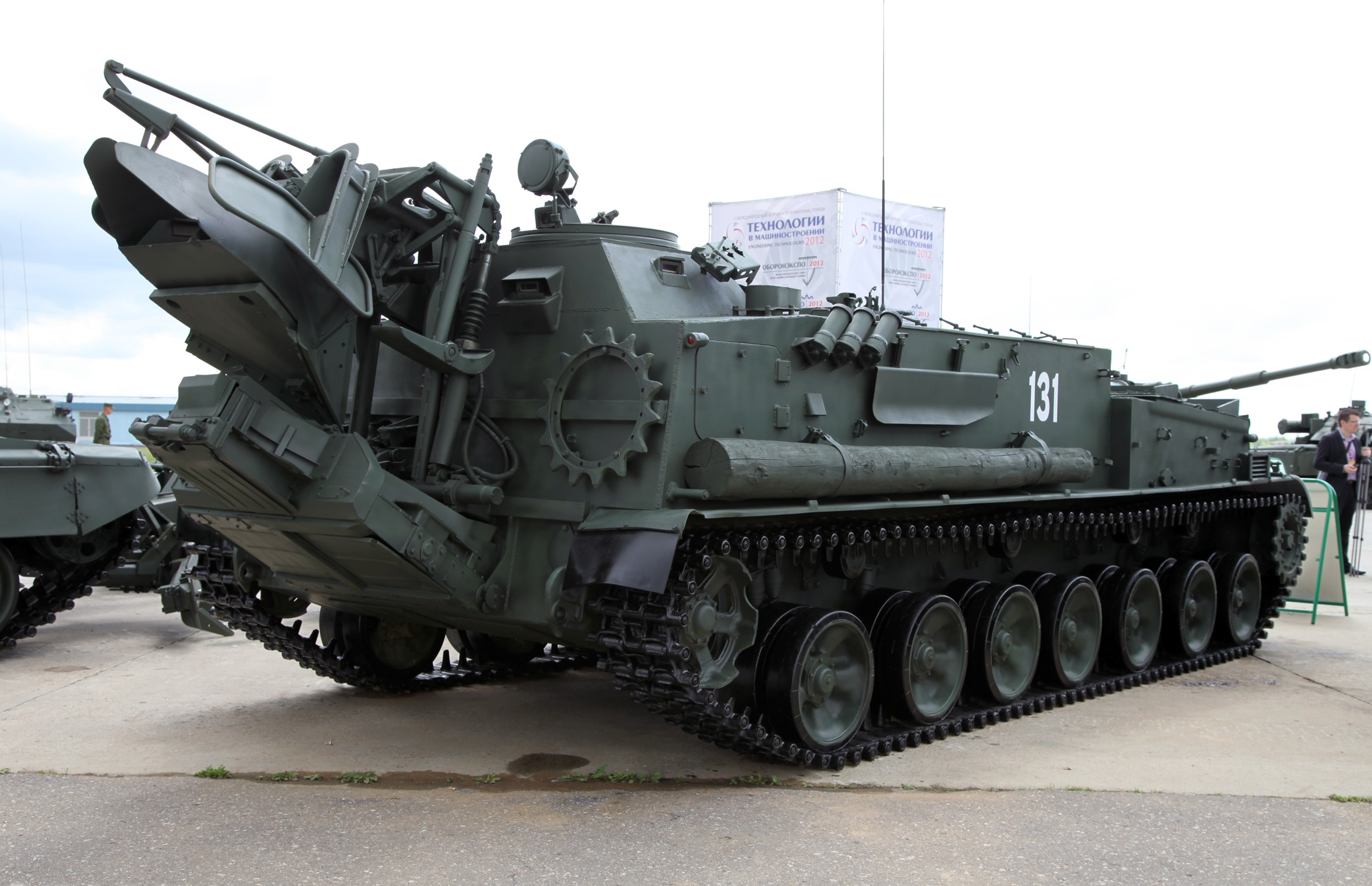
Rear view of the vehicle showing the mine deployment system and the plow device to bury mines

=== Current ===
- Belarus
- Kazakhstan
- Moldova
- Russia
- Transnistria
- Turkmenistan
- Ukraine
- Uzbekistan

=== Former ===
- Donetsk People's Republic
- Luhansk People's Republic
- Soviet Union
