= 2S3 Akatsiya =

Soviet 152 mm self-propelled howitzer

2S3 (SO-152)
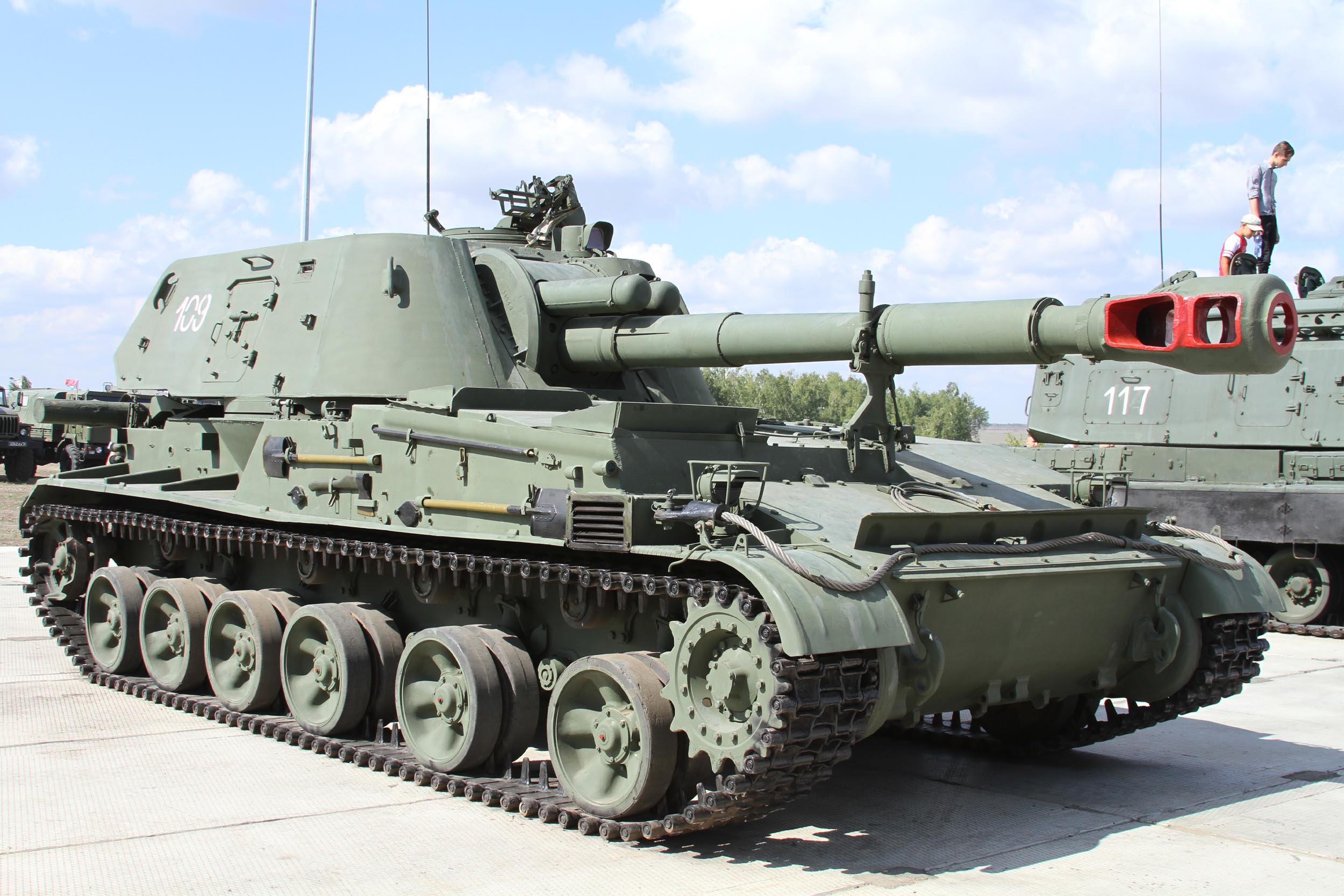
- 2S3 Akatsiya
- Type: Self-propelled artillery
- Place of origin: Soviet Union

Service history
- In service: 1971–present
- Used by: see Operators
- Wars: Soviet–Afghan War; Iran–Iraq War; Gulf War; Tajikistani Civil War; First Chechen War; Second Chechen War; South Ossetia War; First Libyan Civil War; Second Libyan Civil War; Syrian Civil War; War in Donbas; 2020 Nagorno-Karabakh conflict Russo-Ukrainian War

Production history
- Designer: Petrov Design Bureau
- Designed: 1967; 59 years ago
- Manufacturer: Uraltransmash
- Produced: 1967–1993 (2S3, 2S3M, and 2S3M1)
- Variants: see Variants

Specifications
- Mass: Maximum: 28 metric tons
- Length: Total: 8.4 m (27 ft 7 in); Hull: 7.765 m (25 ft 6 in)
- Width: 3.25 m (10 ft 8 in)
- Height: 3.05 m (10 ft 0 in); 2.615 m (8 ft 7.0 in) with no machine gun
- Crew: 4
- Breech: semi-automatic vertical wedge
- Elevation: −4° to +60°
- Traverse: 360°
- Rate of fire: Sustained: 1 rpm max: 4 rpm
- Maximum firing range: Conventional: 18.5 km (11.5 mi); RAP: 24 km (15 mi)
- Armor: 15 mm (hull); 30 mm (turret and hull front)
- Main armament: 152.4 mm D-22 howitzer L/27 (46 rounds, maximum)
- Secondary armament: 7.62 mm remotely controlled PKT tank machine gun (1,500 rounds)
- Engine: V-59 (12-cylinder 4-stroke V-shaped water-cooled diesel); 520 hp (382.7 kW) at 2,000 rpm
- Power/weight: 18.9 hp/t (13.92 kW/t)
- Transmission: mechanical double-flow, planetary gear-gearbox unit
- Suspension: independent torsion bars with hydraulic shock absorbers of 1st and 6th road wheels
- Ground clearance: 0.45 m (1 ft 6 in)
- Fuel capacity: 830 liters
- Operational range: 500 km (310 mi)
- Maximum speed: On-road: 63 km/h (39 mph); Off-road: 45 km/h (28 mph)

The SO-152 (Russian: СО-152), usually known by its GRAU designation 2S3 (Russian: 2С3), is a Soviet 152.4 mm self-propelled gun developed in 1968, as a response to the American 155 mm M109 howitzer. Development began in 1967, according to the Resolution of the Council of Ministers of the Soviet Union from July 4, 1967. In 1968, the SO-152 was completed and in 1971 entered service. The fighting vehicle also received the added designation Akatsiya (Акация), which is Russian for Acacia.

== Description ==
Designated M1973 by the Soviet Army, the Akatsiya is armed with a 152.4 mm howitzer based on the Soviet 152.4 mm D-20 howitzer. The artillery system was developed at the design bureau No. 9 of Sverdlovsk. The factory designation of the howitzer is D-22 and the GRAU designation, 2A33. The chassis was developed by Uraltransmash.

The driver's and engine-transmission compartments are located in the front part of the hull, and the fighting compartment with rotatory turret in middle and rear parts of the hull. The armor is welded rolled steel. The SPG is equipped with an R-123 radio set, an R-124 intercom, an automatic CBRN defense system with filtration unit and fire-fighting equipment. The V-59 12-cylinder four-stroke water-cooled diesel engine connects to a mechanical two-speed transmission. The gear box is combined into one block with a planetary steering gear. The 2S3 has self-entrenching equipment which allows it to prepare a trench within 20–40 min.

The crew consists of 4–6 men: a driver, a gunner, a loader, a commander, and two ammunition bearers, which are positioned to the rear of the vehicle feeding rounds through two hatches in the hull rear when in masked firing position.

=== Armament ===
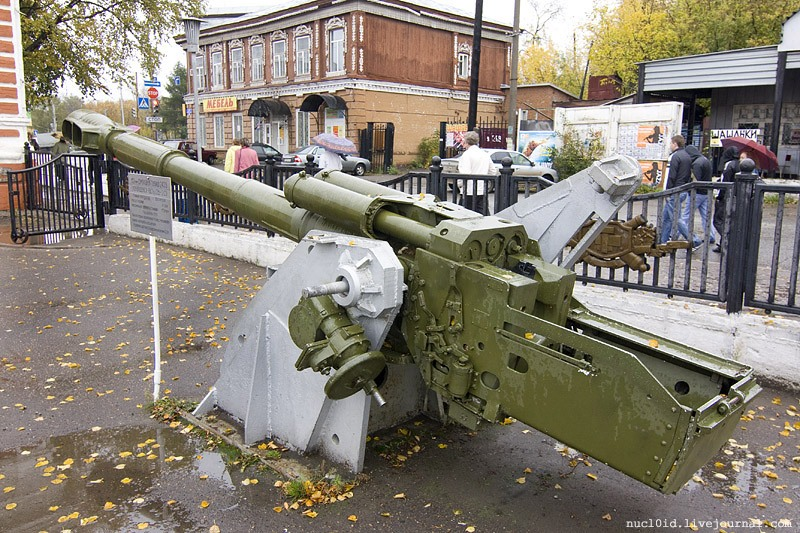
152.4 mm D-22 howitzer, Motovilikha Plants museum, Perm, Russia

The 152.4 mm L/27 howitzer D-22 (2A33) can elevate from −4° to +60° with a turret traverse of a full 360°. Rate of fire is 2.6 – 3.5 rounds/min depending on firing conditions. The howitzer is equipped with a double-baffle muzzle brake, a semi-automatic vertical wedge breechblock and an ejector. The 2S3 has a periscopic sight for laying the howitzer, and telescopic sight for engaging targets with direct fire. The howitzer has separate type of loading with ammunition (35 rounds, later raised to up to 46) arranged in two mechanized stowages (in the turret and in the hull rear). The Akatsiya can fire OF-540 and OF-25 high-explosive fragmenting (HE-Frag) 43.56 kg projectiles (also all types of rounds developed for 152.4 mm towed howitzer-guns ML-20 and D-20, and for towed howitzer D-1) at a maximum range of 18.5 km depending on used charge or rocket-assisted projectiles (RAP) to a maximum of 24 km. Other projectiles available to the Akatsiya include BP-540 high-explosive anti-tank (HEAT-FS) with sight distance of 3 km and 250 mm armor penetration, Br-540B and Br-540 armour-piercing ammunition (AP-T) with 115–120 mm armor penetration at a 1000 m, OF-38 Krasnopol laser-guided rocket-assisted projectiles, S1 illuminating, ZH3 smoke, nuclear (explosive yield of 2 kilotons). Secondary armament consists of a remotely controlled 7.62 mm PK machine gun tank (PKT) on commander's cupola for close range anti-aircraft and self defence.

=== Maneuverability ===
The Akatsiya chassis Objekt 303 is based on that of the Object 123 tracked chassis of the 2K11 Krug surface-to-air missile system; it includes six (rather than seven as in the 2K11 Krug) twin rubber-tired road wheels, four rubber-tired return rollers (two single and two twin), front drive sprocket with detachable sprocket rings (lantern-wheel gear) and idler wheel per side. The track is 14.375 m long, 482 mm wide and has 115 links. The Akatsiya can cross 0.7 m high vertical obstacles, 3.0 m wide trenches, 1.05 m fording depth and climb 30° gradients. It can be transported by the cargo aircraft An-22, which can carry two self-propelled howitzers of this type.

=== Series production ===
Two Object 303 prototypes were built in the end of 1968. Factory tests finished in October 1969, and discovered strong gas contamination of the fighting compartment during intensive gunnery, especially during the use of small charges. As a result, army inspectors did not accept four SO-152s built in summer 1969 for ground tests. The problem of gas contamination was solved, allowing the SO-152 to enter service of the Soviet Army in 1971. The first three serial 2S3s were built by Uraltransmash in the end of 1970, and in 1971 nine were produced. The works received an order for 70 2S3 in 1973. The mass production finished in 1993.

== Variants ==
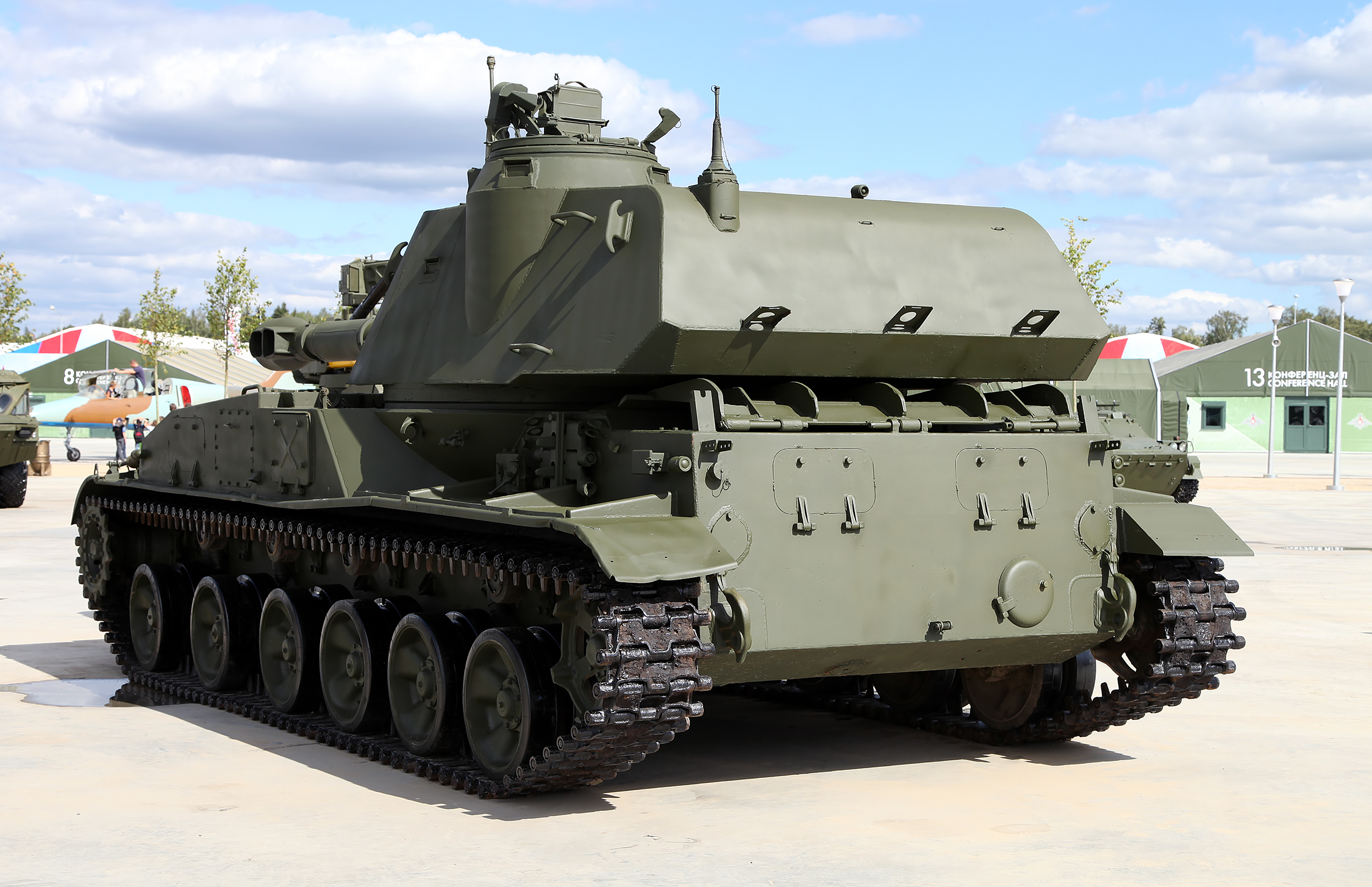
Rear view

- 2S3 (SO-152) – Basic variant, developed in 1968. Produced in 1970–1975. Two modifications used D-11 and D-11M howitzers.
- 2S3M (SO-152M) – Equipped with a mechanized drum-type stowage for 12 rounds, the amount of hatches in rear armored plates of the hull and the turret was reduced, the configuration of those hatches was changed, antenna of R-123 radio set was transferred on a turret top. Ammunition was increased from 40 to 46 rounds (usually consists of 42 OF-540 and OF-25 HE-Frag projectiles, and of 4 BP-540 HEAT-FS projectiles). Much more powerful OF-29 HE-Frag projectiles and OF-38 Krasnopol laser-guided rocket-assisted projectiles were developed for SO-152M. The modernized howitzer has a designator 2A33. Produced in 1975–1987.
- 2S3M1 (SO-152M1) – Equipped with a command data acquisition and display equipment, and with a new SP-538 sight. OF-38 Krasnopol laser-guided rocket-assisted projectiles were added to standard ammunition. Produced in 1987–1993. All 2S3s and 2S3Ms were modernized to 2S3M1 level.
- 2S3M2 (SO-152M2) – Modernized variant equipped with the 1V514-1 Mechanizator-M automated fire control system, a satellite navigational system, and Self-defense is improved with the addition of Type 902B Tucha smoke grenade dischargers. The 2S3M2 has a new barrel 152mm 2A33 L/39 caliber howitzer. It has a maximum firing range of 25 km. It can also fire the KBP Krasnopol laser-guided artillery projectile. Developed in 2000.
- 2S3M2-155 – An export-oriented variant of 2S3M2 equipped with a new 155 mm M-385 howitzer. Developed in 2000.
- 2S3M3 – An experimental variant of 2S3M2 equipped with a further improved fire control system and a modernized howitzer 2A33M that can fire ordnance of a more powerful 2A65 howitzer that equips the 2S19.

== Service and combat history ==
=== Former USSR ===
The 2S3 was intended for the inventory of artillery regiments of Soviet tank and motor rifle divisions. At first, only one gun battalion of each artillery regiment was equipped with the Akatsiya (18 self-propelled howitzers).

By the end of 1980s however self-propelled artillery regiments of Soviet first echelon tank and motor rifle divisions (e.g. those belonging to the Group of Soviet Forces in Germany) each had 36 or 54 self-propelled howitzers of this type (2 or 3 gun battalions). So for example the following artillery regiments all had 54 Akatsiya on their strength:

- 96th self-propelled artillery regiment (stationed in Borna) of 9th Tank Division
- 724th Guards Warsaw self-propelled artillery regiment (stationed in Neustrelitz) of 16th Guards Tank Division
- 400th Red Banner Transylvania self-propelled artillery regiment (stationed in Bernau bei Berlin) of 90th Guards Tank Division
- 1054th Red Banner self-propelled artillery regiment (stationed in Rathenow) of 21st Motor Rifle Division (actual strength: 53)
- 54th Guards Red Banner Poznan self-propelled regiment (stationed in Halle) of 27th Guards Motor Rifle Division
- 944th Guards Red Banner Chernovtsy-Gniezno self-propelled artillery regiment (stationed in Leisnig) of 20th Guards Motor Rifle Division
- 283rd Red Banner Warsaw self-propelled artillery regiment (stationed in Olympisches Dorf) of 35th Motor Rifle Division
- 87th Guards Red Banner Poznan self-propelled artillery regiment (stationed in Gotha) of 39th Guards Motor Rifle Division (actual strength: 52)
- 199th Guards Red Banner Brandenburg self-propelled regiment (stationed in Wismar) of 94th Guards Motor Rifle Division
- 693rd Red Banner self-propelled artillery regiment (stationed in Stendal) of 207th Motor Rifle Division

While the regiments below only had 36 Akatsiya:

- 744th Guards Ternopol self-propelled artillery regiment (stationed in Altengrabow) of 10th Guards Tank Division
- 841st Guards Red Banner Chernovtsy self-propelled artillery regiment (stationed in Chemnitz) of 11th Tank Division
- 117th self-propelled artillery regiment (stationed in Mahlwinkel) of 12th Guards Tank Division had (actually 34)
- 99th Guards Red Banner Pomerania self-propelled regiment (stationed in Magdeburg) of 47th Guards Tank Division
- 172nd Guards Red Banner Berlin self-propelled artillery regiment (stationed in Rudolstadt) of 79th Guards Tank Division

And the 286th Guards Red Banner Prague howitzer artillery brigade stationed in Potsdam was equipped with no less than 72 Akatsiya.

=== Russia ===
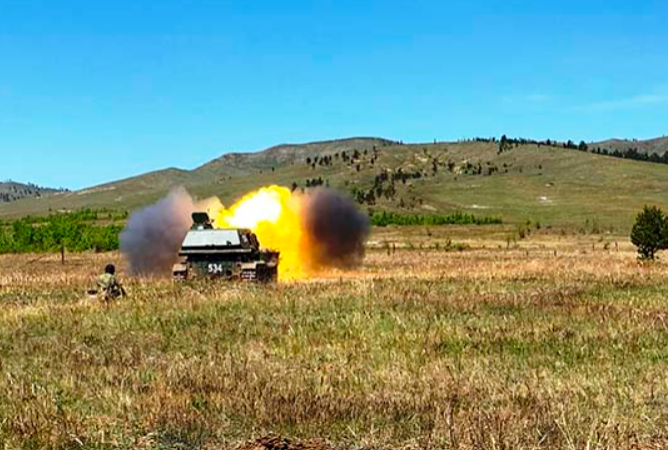
Akatsiya firing

In 2007, the Russian Army had 1,002 2S3 in active service and more than 1,000 in storage, and the Russian Navy (marines) had 400 2S3 in active service and more than 600 in storage. As of now the Akatsiya is used by the following units of the Russian Army or are stationed in following bases (incomplete list):

- 200th Separate Motor Rifle Brigade from Pechenga which is a part of the Leningrad Military District (36 Akatsiya)
- 138th separate motor rifle brigade from Kamenka (near Vyborg) which is a part of the Leningrad Military District (36 Akatsiya)
- 2nd Guards Taman Motor Rifle Division from Alabino (near Moscow) which is a part of the Moscow Military District (96 Akatsiya in 3 motor rifle regiments and 1 tank regiment)
- 3rd Sormovo motor rifle division from Mulino (near Nizhny Novgorod) which is a part of the Moscow Military District (96 Akatsiya in 2 motor rifle regiments and 2 tank regiments)
- 4th Guards Kantemirovka tank division from Naro-Fominsk which is a part of the Moscow Military District (95 Akatsiya in 3 tank regiments and 1 motor rifle regiment)
- 10th Guards Ural-Lvov tank division from Boguchar (Voronezh Oblast) which is a part of the Moscow Military District (75 Akatsiya in 2 tank regiments and 1 motor rifle regiment)
- 81st separate motor rifle regiment from Samara which is a part of the Volga-Ural Military District (25 Akatsiya)
- 27th Guards motor rifle division from Totskoye which is a part of the Volga-Ural Military District (73 Akatsiya in 2 motor rifle regiments and 1 tank regiment)
- 19th Red Banner Voronezh-Shumlin motor rifle division from Vladikavkaz which is a part of the North Caucasus Military District (16 Akatsiya in 3 motor rifle regiments)
- 205th separate motor rifle cossack brigade from Budyonnovsk which is a part of the North Caucasus Military District (12 Akatsiya)
- 136th Guards Uman-Berlin separate motor rifle brigade from Buynaksk (Dagestan) which is a part of the North Caucasus Military District
- 131st separate motor rifle brigade from Maykop (Adygea) which is a part of the North Caucasus Military District (24 Akatsiya)
- 33rd separate motor rifle regiment from Prudboy which is a part of the North Caucasus Military District (12 Akatsiya)
- two arsenals of Central Command in Perm (91 Akatsiya)
- The 8th motor rifle brigade from Tiraspol (Russian operative group in Transnistria) has 36 Akatsiya.

As of now the Akatsiya are used by the following units of the Russian Navy or are stationed in following bases (incomplete list):

- 385th storage in Lugovoe (near Kaliningrad) which belonged to the Baltic Fleet (24 Akatsiya)
- storage in Gusev which belonged to the Baltic Fleet (31 Akatsiya)
- 55th marine division from Vladivostok which belonged to the Pacific Fleet.

All the equipment of 817th self-propelled artillery regiment of 62nd Russian military base of the North Caucasus Military District was withdrawn from Akhalkalaki, Georgia in 2006 according to the Russian-Georgian Sochi agreement, the regiment had 30 Akatsiya and it had planned to relocate some of its self-propelled artillery to 102nd Russian military base in Gyumri, Armenia.

At the moment the 2S3 is considered outdated due to an insufficient range compared to modern self-propelled artillery. A modernized variant was developed in 2000s and 2 gun battalions of the Russian Army (including one of the 2nd Taman motor rifle division) have been reequipped with the 2S3M2 in 2006.

=== Combat history ===
The 2S3 became a well-known self-propelled artillery after combat operations in Afghanistan where it proved to be an effective and reliable artillery system. 2S3s were used quite successfully during two Chechen wars and military conflicts on the territory of the former USSR.

- Soviet–Afghan War (1979–1989)
- Iran–Iraq War (1980–1988)
- Gulf War (1991)
- Civil War in Tajikistan (1992–1997)
- First Chechen War (1994–1996)
- Second Chechen War (1999)
- South Ossetia War (2008)
- Libyan Civil War (2011)
- Syrian Civil War (2011–2024)
- War in Donbas (2014–2022)
- Russian invasion of Ukraine (2022–present)

== Operators ==
2S3 Akatsiya SPGs were exported to foreign countries but in a relatively small amount.

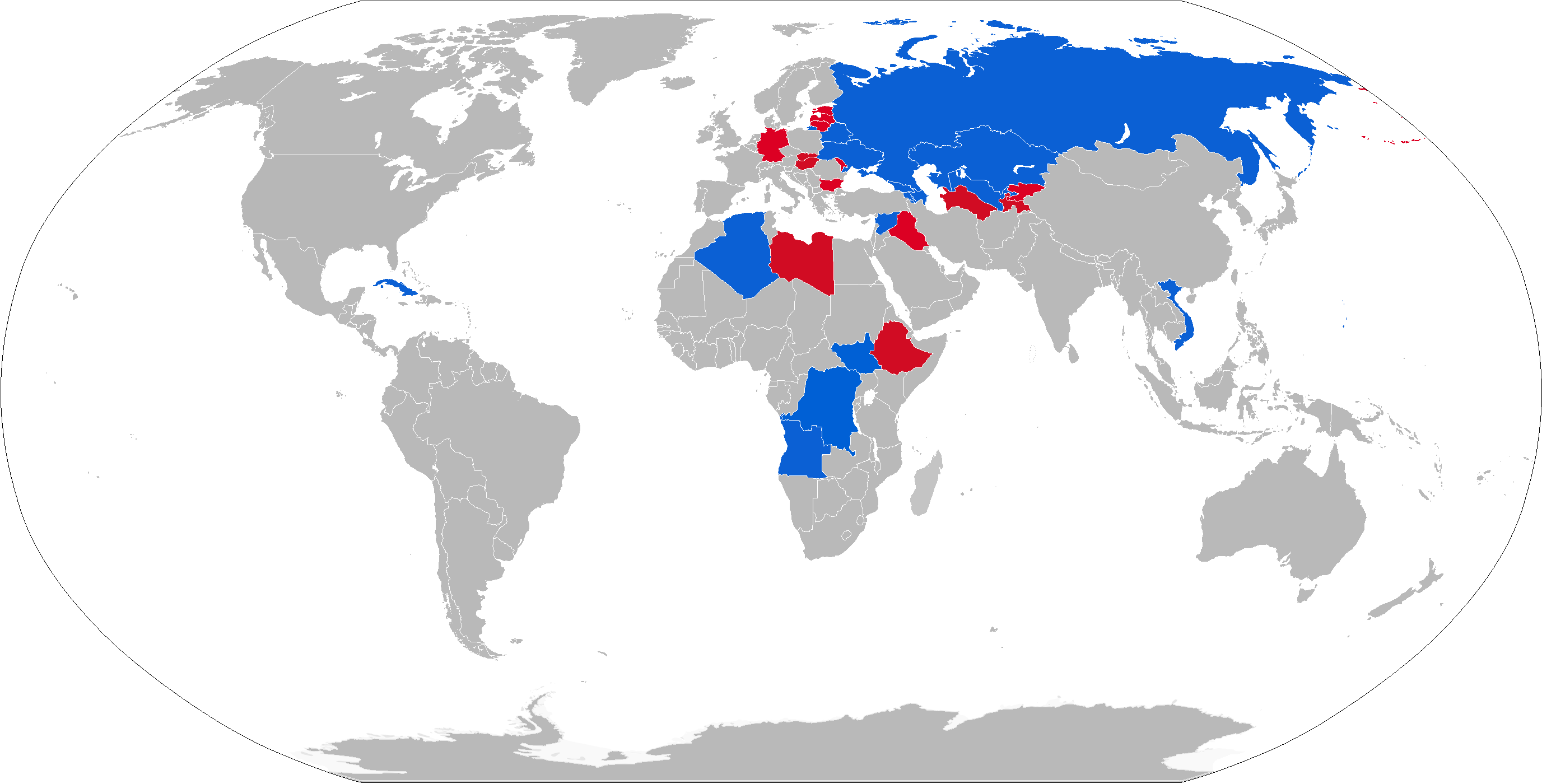
2S3 operators: Current Former

=== Current operators ===
- Algeria – 30
- Angola – 4
- Armenia – 28
- Azerbaijan – 14
- Belarus – 125
- Cuba
- Democratic Republic of the Congo – 10
- Georgia – 13
- Kazakhstan – 60
- Russia – 700 2S3/2S3M used by the Ground Forces and 50 used by the Naval Infantry, while 1,000 2S3 are estimated to be in storage as of 2023
- South Sudan
- Syria
- Ukraine – 140+, used by the Ground Forces and Airborne Assault Troops
- Uzbekistan – 17
- Vietnam – 30

=== Former operators ===
- Bulgaria – 20
- East Germany – 90
- Hungary – 18
- Iraq – Unknown number operational prior to the 2003 invasion of Iraq
- Libya
- Soviet Union – 3,500+ used by the Ground Forces and Naval Infantry. Passed on to Commonwealth of Independent States members
- Tajikistan − 36 in 2017
- United States – 7, 4 transferred from Germany 1993, 3 transferred from Ukraine 2000

== See also ==
- M109 – (United States)
- 2S5 Giatsint-S – (Soviet Union, Russia)
- 2S19 Msta-S – (Soviet Union, Russia)
- 2S35 Koalitsiya-SV – (Russia)
- 2S1 Gvozdika – (Soviet Union)

== Bibliography ==
- Institute for Strategic Studies (1989). The military balance, 1989-1990. London: Brassey's. p. 34. ISBN 978-0080375694.
- International Institute for Strategic Studies (February 15, 2023). The Military Balance 2023 (1st ed.). Routledge. pp. 201−204. ISBN 978-1032508955.
