= Uraltransmash =

Company in Russia

- Company type: Subsidiary
- Industry: Rail transport
- Founded: 1817; 209 years ago
- Headquarters: Yekaterinburg, Russia
- Area served: Worldwide
- Products: Locomotives; High-speed trains Intercity and commuter trains Trams; People movers Signalling systems

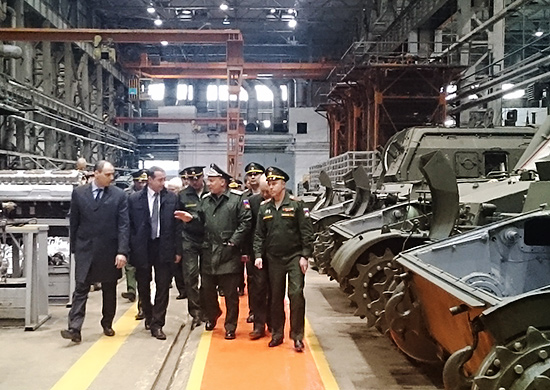
Deputy Minister of Defense Yuriy Borisov visiting Uraltransmash in 2016

Uraltransmash (Russian: Уральский завод транспортного машиностроения) is a company based in Yekaterinburg, Russia. Currently it is a subsidiary of Uralvagonzavod.

Uraltransmash is Russia's primary producer of self-propelled artillery. Uraltransmash also produces oil drilling rigs and some other civil products.

In a 2019 research paper, RAND Corporation assessed the company as being "among the worst run enterprises in the Russian defense industry".

== History ==
The Ural Plant of Transport Engineering is one of the oldest enterprises in the Ural: its history is more than two hundred years old. The foundation of the enterprise was laid by a gold-mining factory founded in 1817 in Yekaterinburg. Thirty years later, a machine-building plant was built in its place, making steam engines, boilers, locomotives, equipment for the mining industry.

After 1917 the plant was nationalized and named Metallist. After the reconstruction, it began to produce oil-producing and oil-refining equipment, and carried out orders for new buildings during the period of industrialization.

The modern history of the enterprise began during the Eastern Front (World War II). In the second half of 1941, collectives of evacuated enterprises from Moscow, Podolsk and Stalingrad were housed in the buildings of the plant. The installation of new equipment began and soon the first light tank T-60 went to the front from the plant. During the first six months of production, the plant produced 1238 light tanks.

Since then, the plant has developed or modernized about forty types of military equipment. The company has a design bureau that has created a number of new military products.

In 1989, Uraltransmash produced its first self-propelled howitzer, the 2S19 Msta. Modifications of the Msta-S are still being supplied to the Russian army. In particular, in November 2011, the troops of the Southern Military District in the Chechen Republic received 26 new 2S19M1 Msta-S self-propelled howitzers, which replaced the outdated 2S3 Akatsiya installations.

In addition to military products, Uraltransmash manufactures pumping units for oil production, winches for passenger and freight elevators, low-floor trams. In 2012, it is planned to start serial production of trams with batteries.

The company was involved in a notable legal case in December 2021, when the Russian Supreme Court issued its judgement in the PESA v. UralTransMash case.

== Products ==
- 2S3 Akatsiya
- 2S12 Sani
- 2S19 Msta
- 2S35 Koalitsiya-SV
- 71-415
- GMZ-3
