= 2S5 Giatsint-S =

Soviet 152 mm self-propelled gun

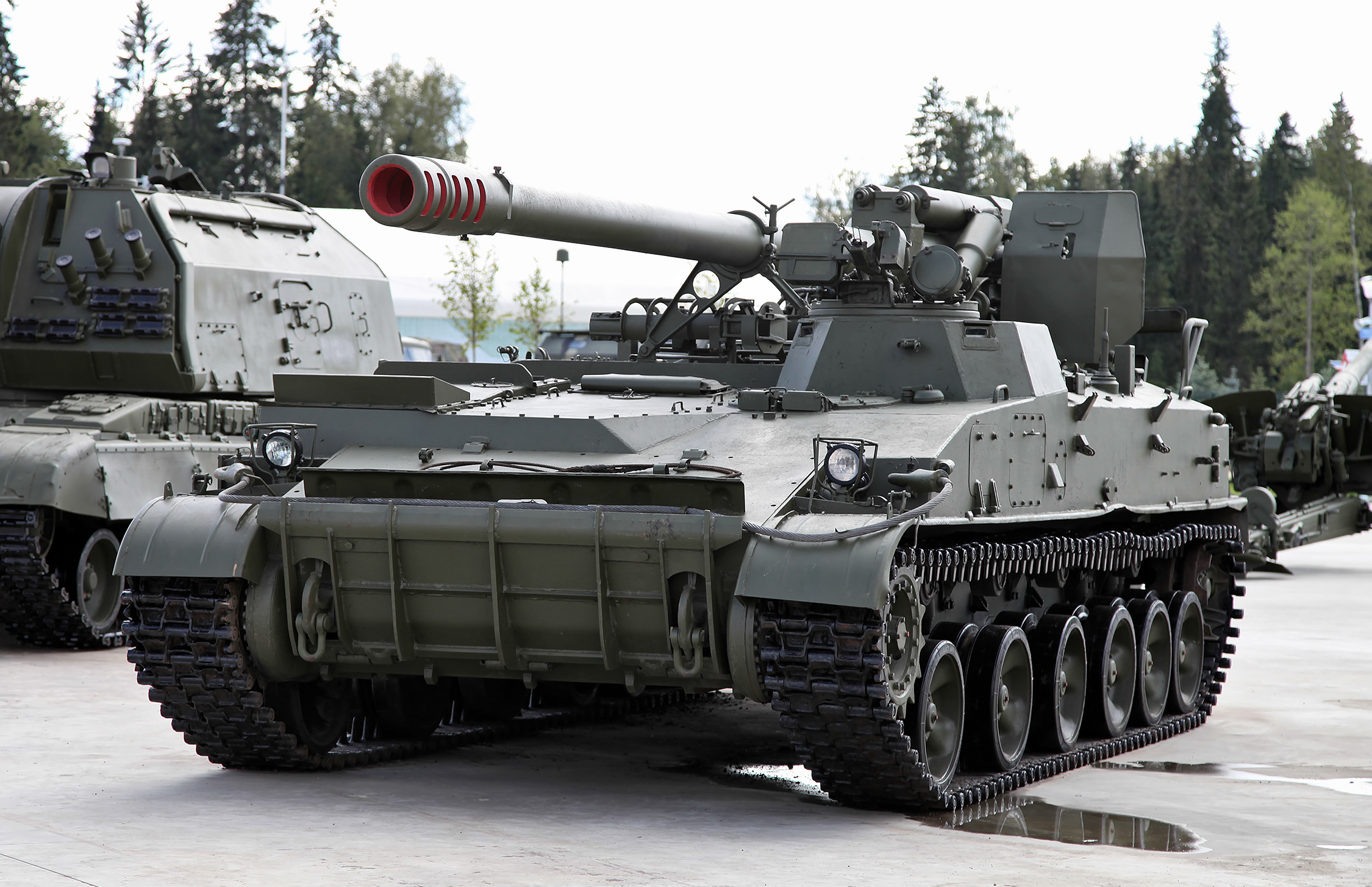
- 152-mm self-propelled howitzer 2S5 Giatsint-S
- Type: Self-propelled artillery
- Place of origin: Soviet Union

Service history
- In service: 1978–present
- Wars: Soviet–Afghan War; First Chechen War; Second Chechen War; War in Donbas; Russo-Ukraine War

Production history
- Designed: 1967–1974
- Produced: 1976–1991

Specifications
- Mass: 28.2 tons (61,729 lbs)
- Length: 8.33 m (27.32 ft)
- Width: 3.25 m (10.66 ft)
- Height: 2.76 m (9 ft)
- Crew: 5 (section of 7 with 2 in ammunition carrier)
- Armor: 15 mm (.59 in)
- Main armament: 152 mm 2A37 L54-caliber gun (30 rounds)
- Secondary armament: 1× 7.62 mm machine gun
- Engine: Diesel; 388 kW (520 hp)
- Suspension: torsion bar
- Operational range: 500 km (311 mi)
- Maximum speed: 62 km/h (38 mph) (road); 25 km/h (15 mph) (off-road)

The 2S5 Giatsint-S (Russian: 2С5 «Гиацинт-С», lit. 'hyacinth') is a Soviet 152 mm self-propelled gun. "2S5" is its GRAU designation. It has nuclear, biological, and chemical protection. The 2S5 is capable of engaging targets at longer ranges and at a higher rate of fire than the more widely produced 2S3 Akatsiya 152 mm self-propelled gun, and is capable of firing nuclear projectiles.

== Production history ==
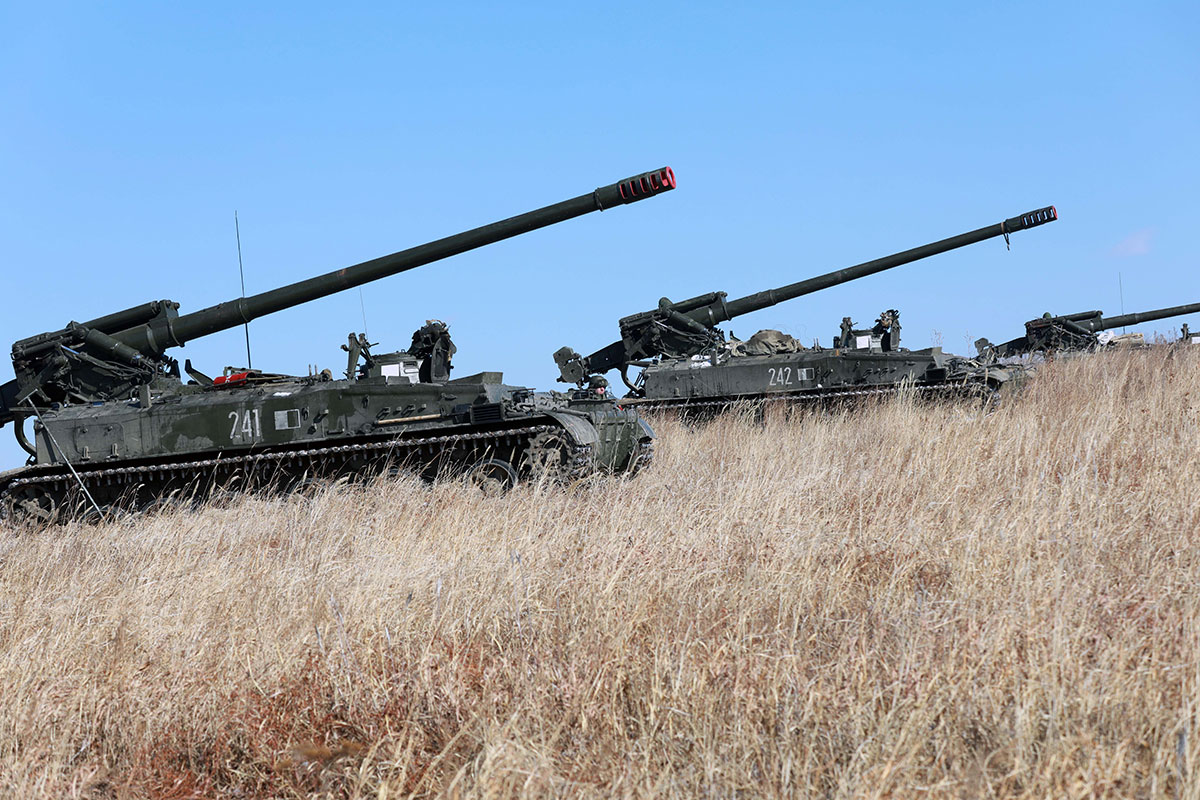
Russian Army 2S5 howitzers during a field exercise in 2020.

Production of the 2S5 Giatsint-S (Hyacinth) started in 1976 along with the towed version the 2A36 Giatsint-B. It uses a chassis modified from the SA-4 Krug surface-to-air missile system with good cross-country mobility and is powered by a V-59 diesel engine which develops 520 hp. Giatsint-S can carry 30 152 mm rounds with a range of 28 kilometers, or 33-40 kilometers for rocket-assisted projectiles. In addition to high explosives, the gun can also fire HEAT, cluster, smoke and nuclear projectiles. Deploying to fire the gun takes 3 minutes, and it can sustain a rate of fire of 5 to 6 rounds per minute. Most of the crew, with the exception of the gunner, deploys outside of the vehicle while firing. It is usually accompanied by an ammunition carrier with an additional 30 rounds of ammunition.

The 2S5 was introduced into service in 1978, replacing the 130 mm M46 field gun battalions in Soviet artillery brigades at the Army and Front level, and has also been known as the M1981 by the United States. Production ceased in 1991.

Supplies of a new wheeled version codenamed 2S44 Giatsint-K reportedly begun in December 2024. The version hosts the undercarriage of the 2S43 Malva.

== Operational history ==
The 2S5 was first used in combat by the Soviet Union in Soviet–Afghan War. Later, Russian forces used it in the First Chechen War and Second Chechen War.

The 2S5 has been employed by the Ukrainian Army and Russian Army in the war in Donbas.

== Operators ==
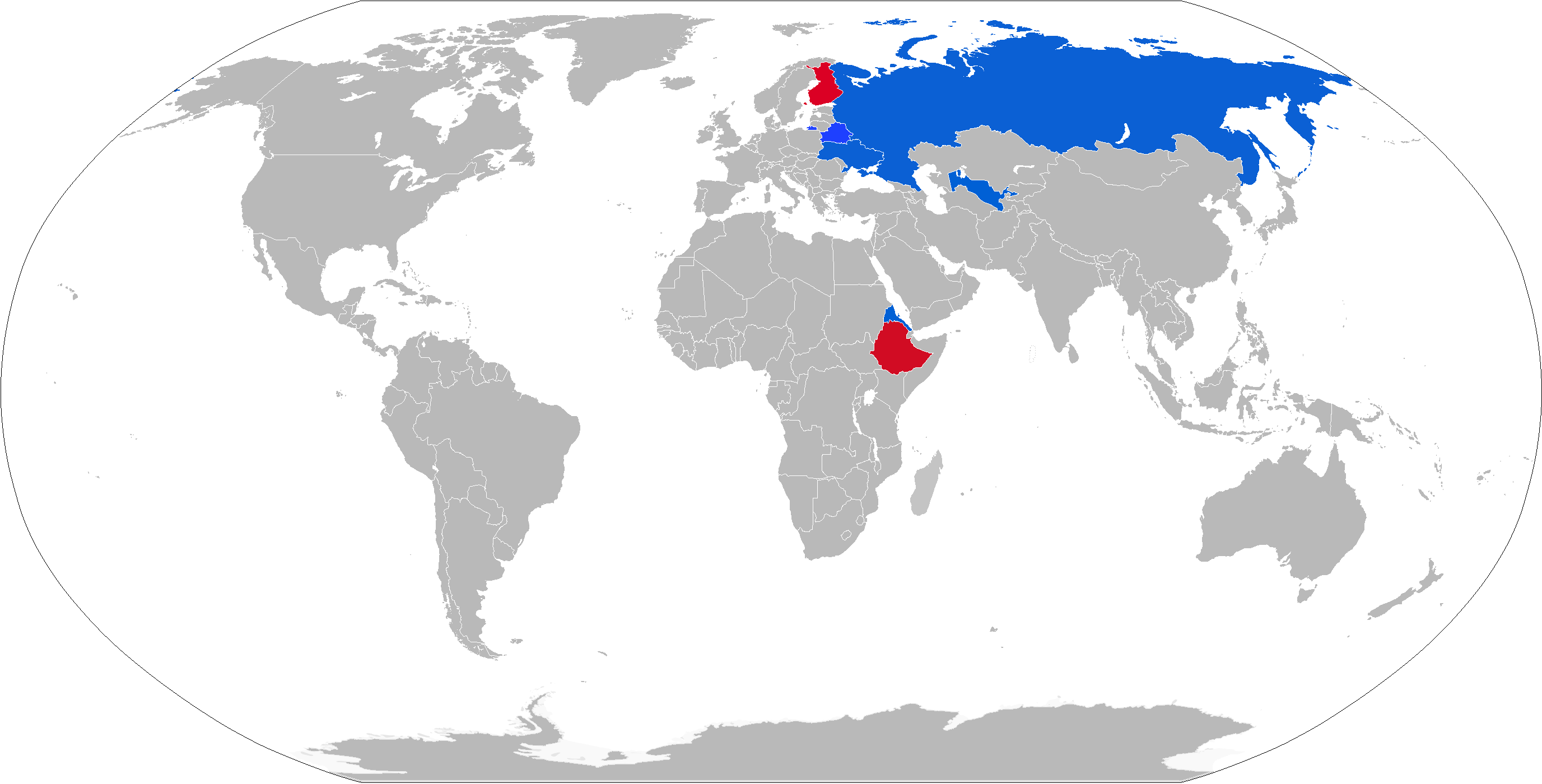
Map of 2S5 operators in blue with former operators in red

=== Current operators ===
- Belarus − 107
- Eritrea − 13
- Russia − 85 (850 in storage)
- Ukraine − 10
- Uzbekistan − Reportedly

=== Former operators ===
- Ethiopia − 10 former Russian vehicles
- Finland − 18, under the designation 152 TELAK 91
- Soviet Union − 2,100 in 1989

== See also ==
- 2A36 Giatsint-B
- List of AFVs
- List of artillery

== Bibliography ==
- International Institute for Strategic Studies (15 February 2023). The Military Balance 2023 (1st ed.). Routledge. pp. 201−204. ISBN 978-1032508955.
