= 2S19 Msta-S =

Soviet/Russian 152 mm self-propelled howitzer

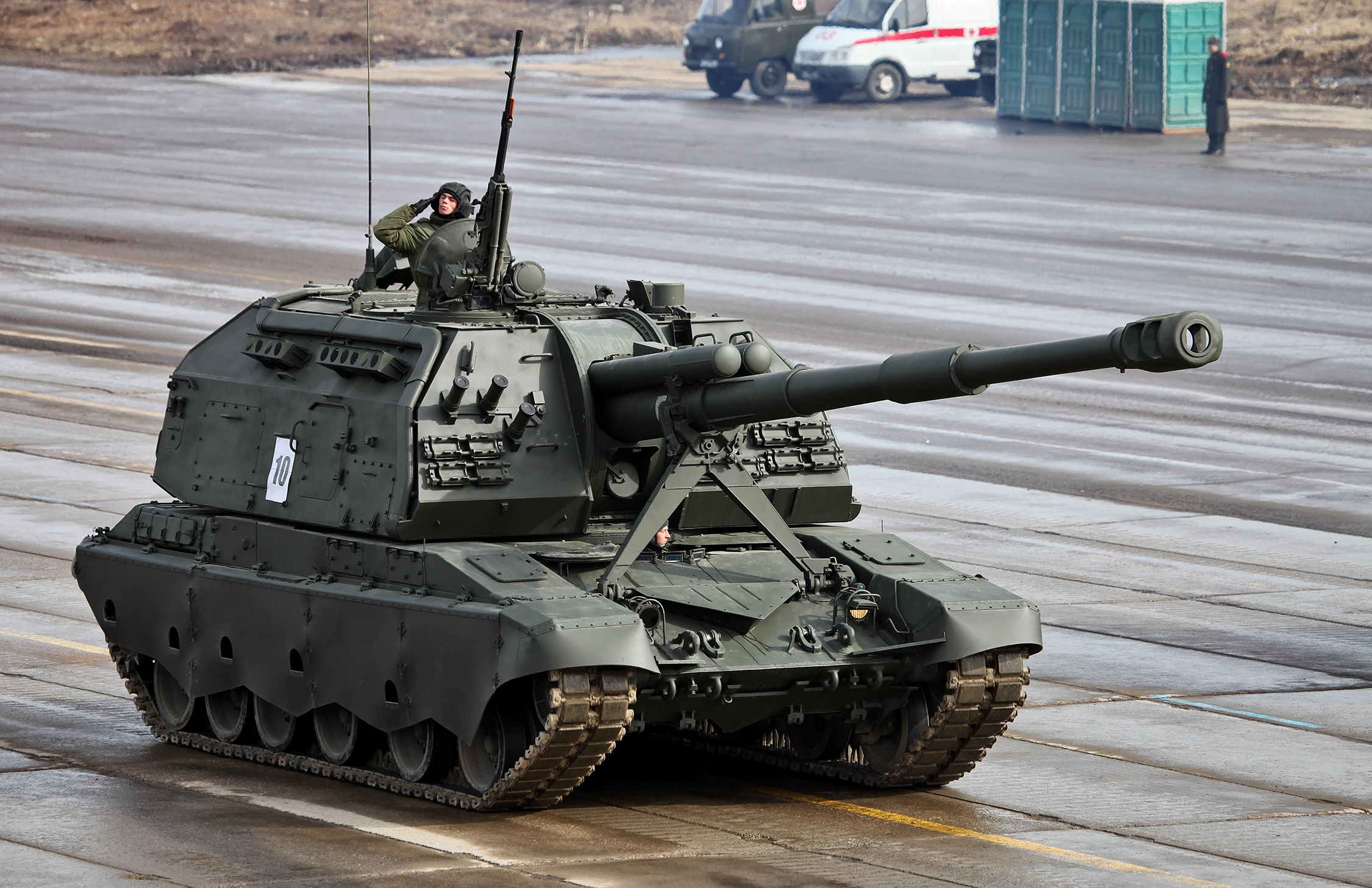
- A 2S19M2 Msta-S during a rehearsal of the 2014 Moscow Victory Day Parade held in Alabino
- Type: Self-propelled howitzer
- Place of origin: Soviet Union/Russia

Service history
- In service: 1989–present
- Used by: See § Operators
- Wars: Eritrean–Ethiopian War; Second Chechen War; Russo-Ukrainian War; Second Nagorno-Karabakh War

Production history
- Designer: Uraltransmash
- Designed: 1980
- Manufacturer: Uraltransmash
- Produced: 1988–present
- No. built: ~1,130 (est. 1988–2019, inc. prototypes)

Specifications
- Mass: 42 tonnes (93,000 lb)
- Length: 7.15 m (23 ft 5 in)
- Width: 3.38 m (11 ft 1 in)
- Height: 2.99 m (9 ft 10 in)
- Crew: 5
- Elevation: −4° to +68°
- Traverse: 360°
- Rate of fire: 2S19: 6–8 rounds/min 2S19M2: 10 rounds/min
- Maximum firing range: Standard round: 24.7 km (15.3 mi); Base bleed: 29 km (18 mi); RAP: 36 km (22 mi)
- Armour: 15 mm all-around
- Main armament: 152 mm 2A64 L47-caliber howitzer
- Secondary armament: 12.7 mm NSVT anti-aircraft machine gun
- Engine: Diesel V-84A; 840 hp (630 kW)
- Power/weight: 20 hp/tonne
- Suspension: Torsion bar
- Operational range: 500 km (310 mi)
- Maximum speed: 60 km/h (37 mph)

Video of the inside of a Msta-S during the 2022 Russian invasion of Ukraine

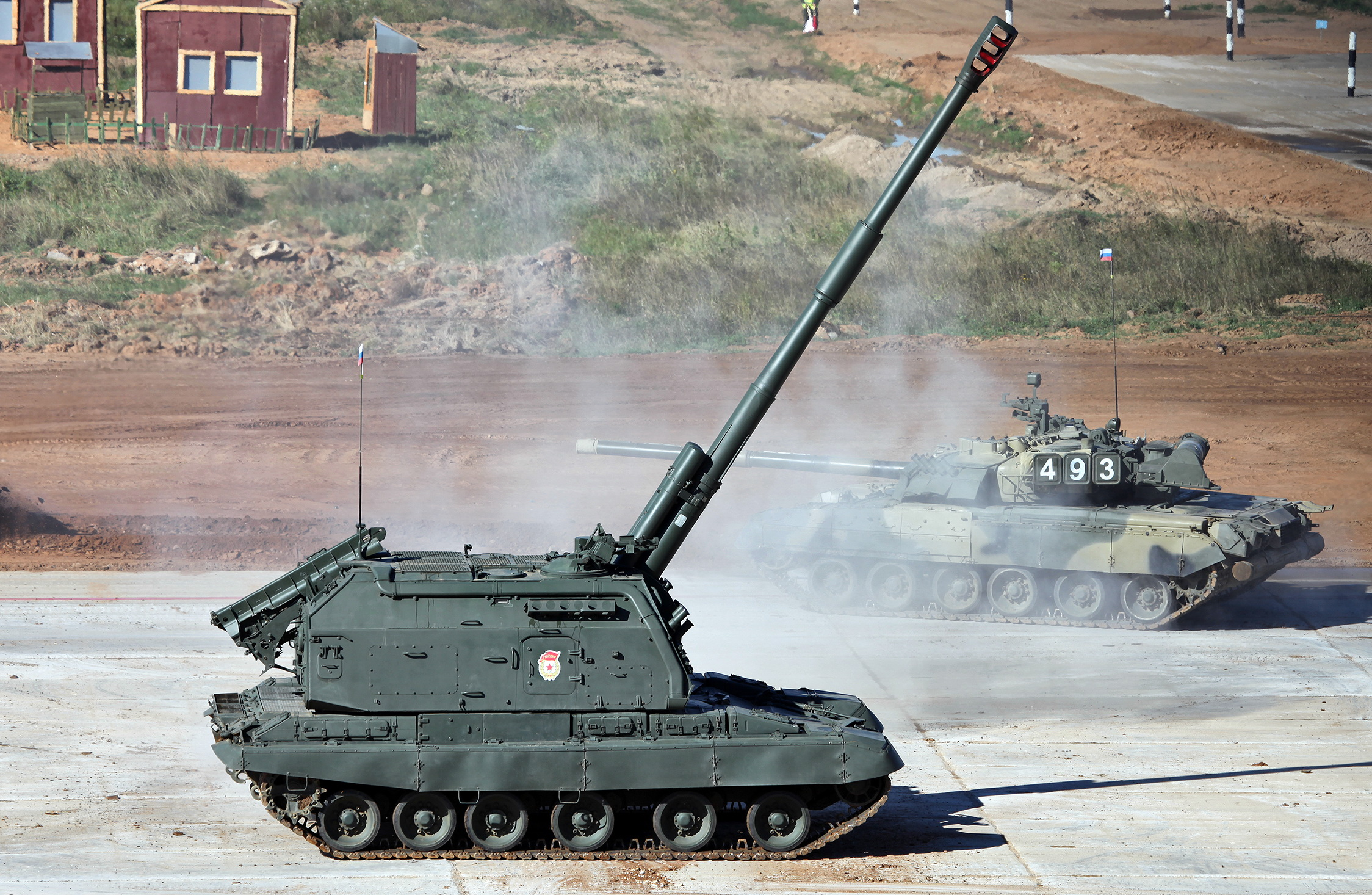
Msta-S at the 2013 tank biathlon

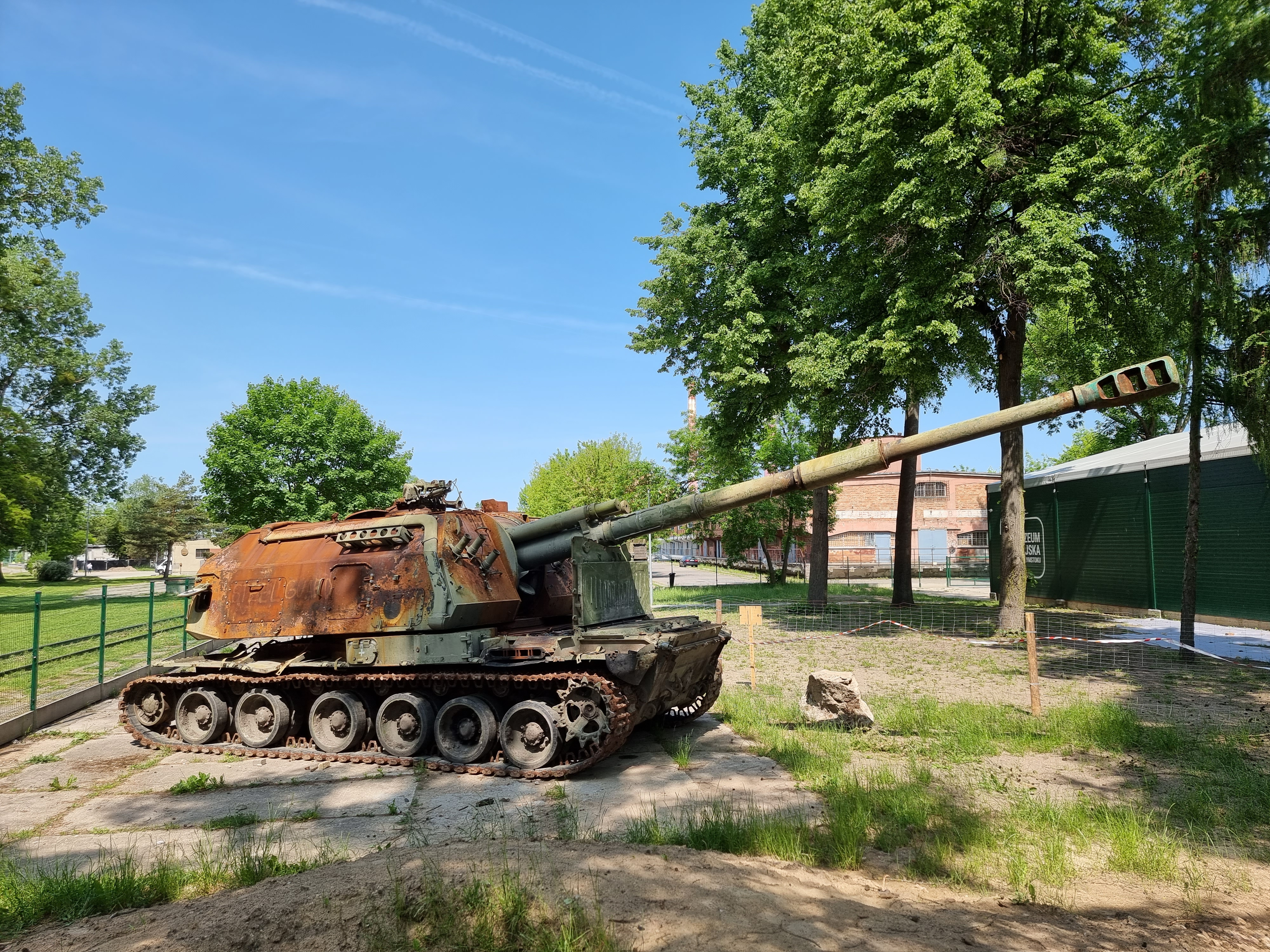
A Russian 2S19 Msta-S that was damaged in 2022 during the Russian invasion of Ukraine, on display at the military park of the army museum in Białystok, Poland, in 2023

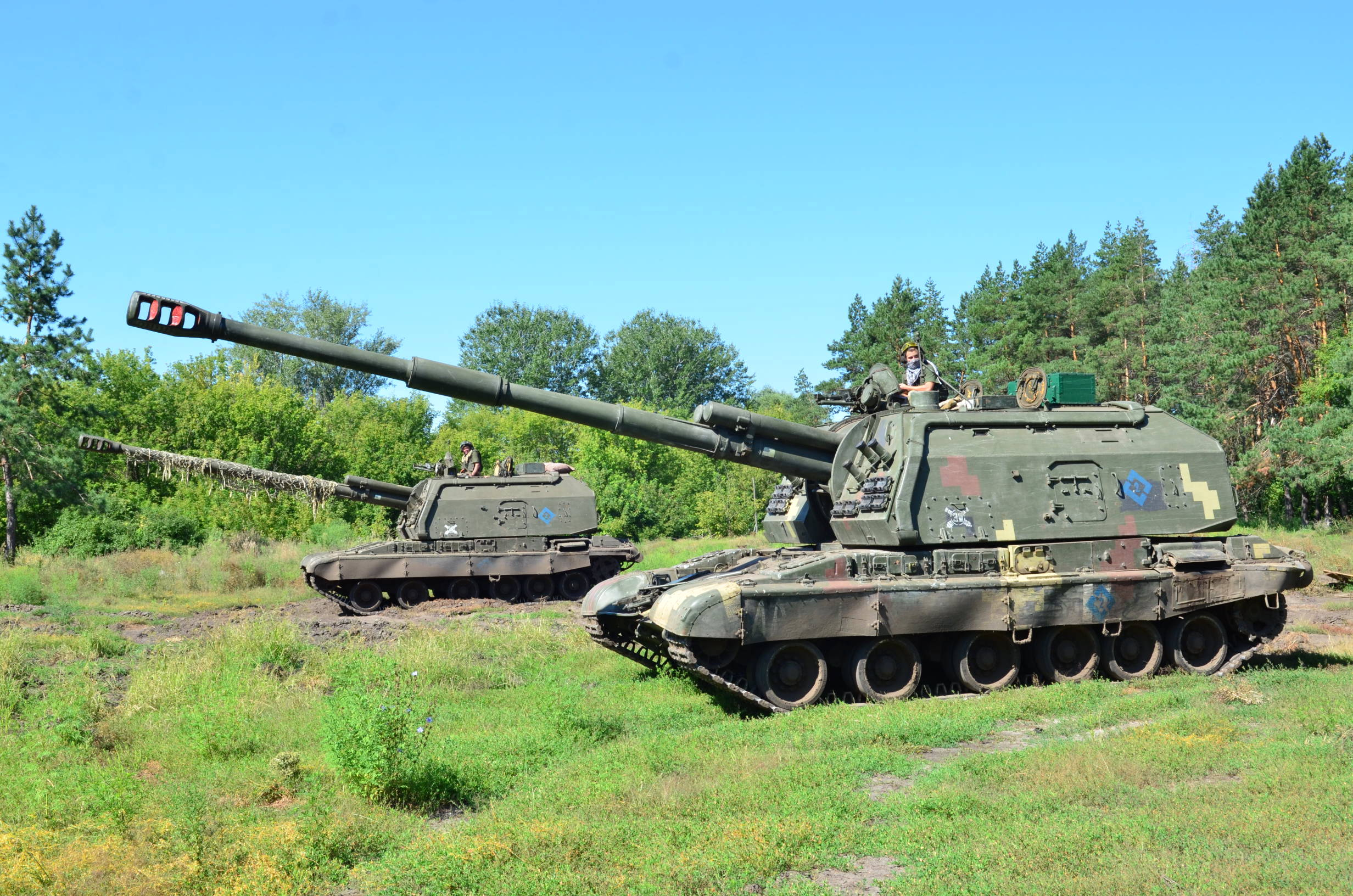
2S19 Msta-S of the Ukrainian 26th Artillery Brigade

The 2S19 Msta-S is a 152.4 mm self-propelled howitzer designed and manufactured by Uraltransmash in the Soviet Union and later in Russia, which entered service in 1989 as the successor to the 2S3 Akatsiya. The vehicle has the running gear of the T-80, but is powered by the T-72's diesel engine.

== Development ==
The Msta-S (also known by the GRAU index 2S19) bears the Msta (Russian: Мста, after the river Msta) howitzer, which was designed for deployment either on a self-propelled vehicle or as a towed gun. The 2S19 Msta-S is the armoured self-propelled howitzer, while the 2A65 Msta-B is a towed gun.

Development of the 2S19 started in 1980 under the project name Ferma. The prototype was known as Obiekt 316. The 2S19's standard equipment consists of a semi-automatic laying system 1P22, an automatic loader, an NBC protection system, passive night-vision device for the driver, a vehicle snorkel, a dozer blade, a smoke generator and 81 mm smoke launchers, 1V116 intercom system and a 16 kW generator AP-18D. In 2008, the Russian Armed Forces ordered an improved model with an automated fire-control system.

Russia offered its Msta-S 152 mm howitzer to foreign countries, particularly in the Middle East. A demonstration was organised in 2020 by Rosoboronexport, the country's nodal agency for arms export, for representatives from various Middle Eastern countries.

== Specifications ==
Msta-S specifications provided by manufacturer

- Range:
  - 24.7 km (15.3 mi) standard round
  - 28.9 km (18.0 mi) base-bleed
  - 36 km (22 mi) rocket-assisted
- Rate of fire: 6–8 rounds per minute
- Weapon elevation: −4° to +68°
- Weapon traverse: 360°
- Deployment time: 22 minutes
- Unit of fire: 50 rounds

== Variants ==
- 1K17 Szhatie – a "laser tank" armed with a battery of lasers meant to disable optoelectronic systems; based on the Msta-S.
- 2S19M1 (unveiled in 2000, first deliveries in 2007) – Improved fire-control system and added GLONASS antenna. Modernised V-84AMS engine.
- 2S19M2 or 2S33 Msta-SM2 (2013) – Improved version currently in production equipped with a new automatic fire-control system which increases the rate of fire to 10 rounds per minute. Digital electronic maps are now available which significantly speeds up the terrain orientation in difficult geographical conditions and allows performing faster and more efficiently firing missions. The 2S33 Msta-SM2 howitzer is fitted with a new 2A79 152 mm/L60 ordnance that has improved ballistics. It can fire ammunition with more propellant charges and with a higher breech pressure than the original 2S19 Msta-S. The gun is longer and has a heavier barrel. As a result, it has a greater range of fire. Maximum range of fire with standard HE-FRAG shells is 30 km (19 mi) and 40 km (25 mi) with rocket-assisted shells.
- 2S19M1-155 (2006) – 155 mm export version of the 2S19M1, fitted with an L/52 gun with a range of more than 40 km (25 mi). Modernised in 2020.
- 2S21 Msta-K – Wheeled variant, based on an eight-wheel truck chassis. It used the 2A67 gun, a variant of the 2A65 modified for use from wheeled platforms. There were several different prototypes, including one based on the Ural-5323 and one on the KrAZ-6316. The project was abandoned in 1987.
- 2S19M (also known as 2S30 Iset and 2S33 Msta-SM) – Project for a version with improved range and rate of fire, easier maintenance and optimised manufacturing process. Started between the 1990s and the early 2000s, but quickly abandoned in favour of the 2S35 Koalitsiya-SV.
- 2S35 Koalitsiya-SV – Project for a new artillery system for the Russian Ground Forces (SV stands for "sukhoputniye voyska"). Early prototypes consisted of a 2S19 chassis with modified turret, fitted with an over-and-under dual autoloaded 152 mm howitzer. Development of this variant was abandoned in favour of an entirely new artillery system using the same designation.

== Operational use ==
About a dozen Msta-S howitzers were purchased by Ethiopia in late 1998, and used during the Eritrean–Ethiopian War. They were successfully used to destroy an Eritrean Air Force radar station outside Adi Quala.

Msta-S howitzers were used by the Russian Ground Forces to deliver artillery strikes against Chechen separatists during the Second Chechen War.

Msta-S howitzers have been used in the Russo-Ukrainian War by the pro-Russian separatists who captured one machine during the conflict. Both Msta-B and Msta-S were used by the Ukrainian Ground Forces in the Battle of Bakhmut. With their vehicles wearing out from continued combat use since 2014, and the 152 mm caliber gradually becoming obsolete, the Ukrainian Armed Forces has refitted some non-operational units with T-72 turrets or converted them into armoured personnel carriers.

As of 9 August 2025, there is visual evidence of Russian forces losing 246 Msta-S (194 destroyed, 14 damaged, 3 abandoned and 35 captured) and 54 Msta-SM2 (33 destroyed, 3 damaged and 18 captured).

== Operators ==
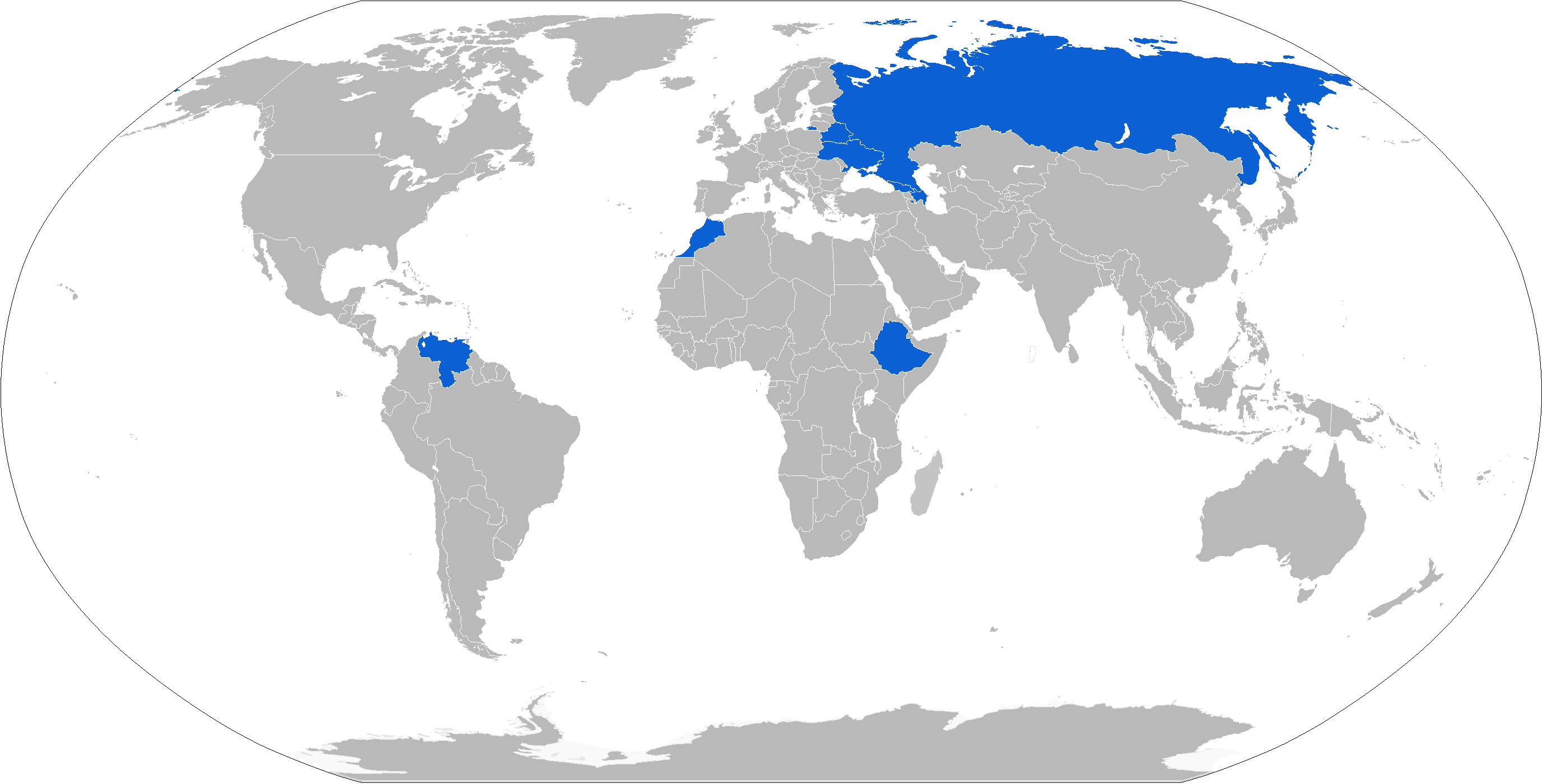
Map of 2S19 operators in blue

=== Current ===
- Azerbaijan – 18 as of 2024
- Ethiopia – 10 as of 2024
- Georgia – 1 as of 2024
- Russia – Estimated to have 300 2S19/2S19M1 Msta-S and 300 2S19M2/2S33 Msta-SM in service with the Ground Forces, 36 2S19M1 Msta-S in service with the Naval Infantry, plus 150 2S19 Msta-S in storage as of 2024
- Ukraine – 35 as of 2024
- Venezuela – 48 as of 2024

=== Former ===
- Belarus − 12 in 2023, none as of 2024
- Soviet Union
