= Vityaz (ATV) =

Vityaz DT-3/DT-10/DT-20/DT-30
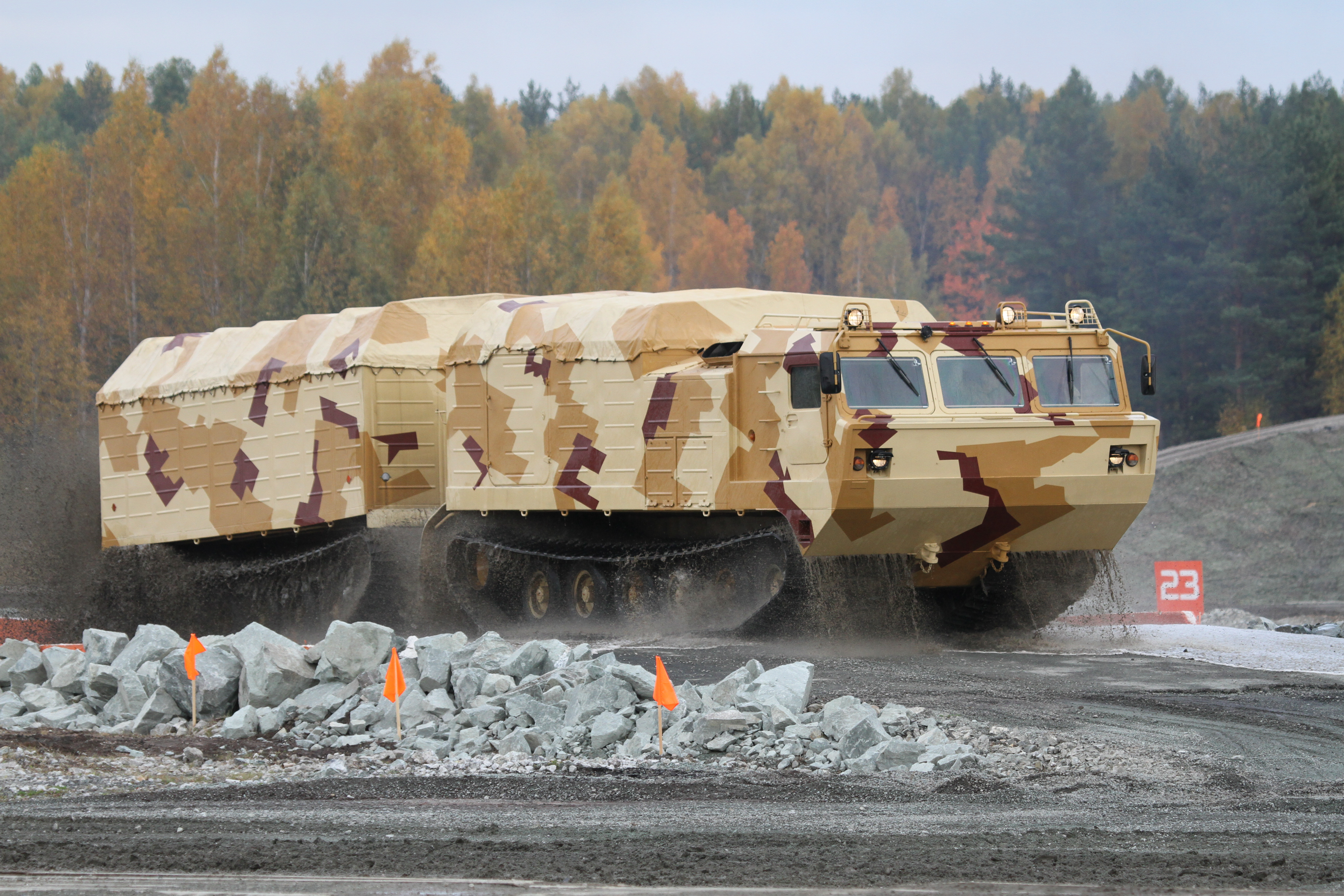
- A DT-30P1.
- Type: tracked articulated vehicle
- Place of origin: Soviet Union

Service history
- In service: 1982-present
- Used by: Russian Federation; Ukraine

Production history
- Designed: 1971
- Manufacturer: Ishimbai Transport Machine-Building Plant
- Produced: 1982-present
- No. built: Unknown
- Variants: DT-10; DT-20; DT-30

Specifications
- Mass: 31 t (31 long tons; 34 short tons), DT-10P; 58 t (57 long tons; 64 short tons), DT-30
- Length: 13.75 m (45 ft 1 3/8 in)
- Width: 2.80 m (9 ft 2 1/4 in)
- Height: 2.70 m (8 ft 10 1/4 in)
- Crew: 2

The Vityaz DT is a family of multi-purpose articulated tracked carrier developed in the Soviet Union. It was designed to carry heavy loads in difficult terrain like swamps, sand and snow in extreme weather conditions.

== History ==
By the early 1960s, the Soviet Union's increased need for a more advanced ATV was becoming obvious as the single-unit tracked snow and swamp-going vehicles in operation at that time could not carry payloads in excess of 5 tonnes (4.9 long tons; 5.5 short tons). To fill the need for such vehicles, a specialized design bureau was established with the task of developing articulated tracked vehicles. Also a military vehicle able to operate on USSR northern borders was deemed necessary.

In February 1971 the first two ATVs, designated DT-LP and DT-L, were produced for the State trials. Three types operational today (DT-10P, DT-20P and DT-30 ATVs) entered service in 1980s. In 1982, the Ishimbai Transport Machine-Building Plant (Ishimbaitransmash) assimilated the series production and turned out the first batch of the DT-10P ATVs.

In late 1981, trials of the DT-30P and DT-30 two-unit ATVs were completed. These trials were carried out in severe weather and terrain conditions in various military districts and demonstrated that the vehicles possessed high cross-country ability and load-carrying capacity and could be used effectively to transport military hardware and non-military equipment in severe climatic conditions of the northern part of Russia, in Siberia, and Far East, as well as in the desert. Eventually their performance was found superior to demands, as they outperformed all Russian-made and foreign vehicles of this class.

An intensive research and development program continued up to 1985, creating standardised series comprising:

- two-unit transport vehicles DT-10, DT-20 and DT-30, with a load-carrying capacity of 10 or 20 or 30 tonnes (9.8 or 19.7 or 29.5 long tons; 11.0 or 22.0 or 33.1 short tons), respectively;
- two-unit amphibious transporters DT-10P, DT-20P and DT-30P with similar specifications as the regular transporters.

Today, Vityaz CTVs are in use throughout the whole territory of Russia, as well as in Arctic and Antarctica. They are an invaluable part of the transport services for prominent companies such as Gazprom JSC, Rosneftegazstroi, Rosneftegaz JSC, etc. They serve as primary transport vehicles for the personnel who service the oil and gas pipelines throughout Russia, for geologists and scientists who research the remote and isolated regions. For different industries were produced several specialised versions: DT-30K crane, DT-30E excavator, refuelling vehicles, mobile workshops, mobile oil refineries, passenger transporters, fire-fighting vehicles. Vehicles of kind are in demand not only in Russia, but throughout the countries of the Middle East and Asia, as well as in North and South America.

== Description ==
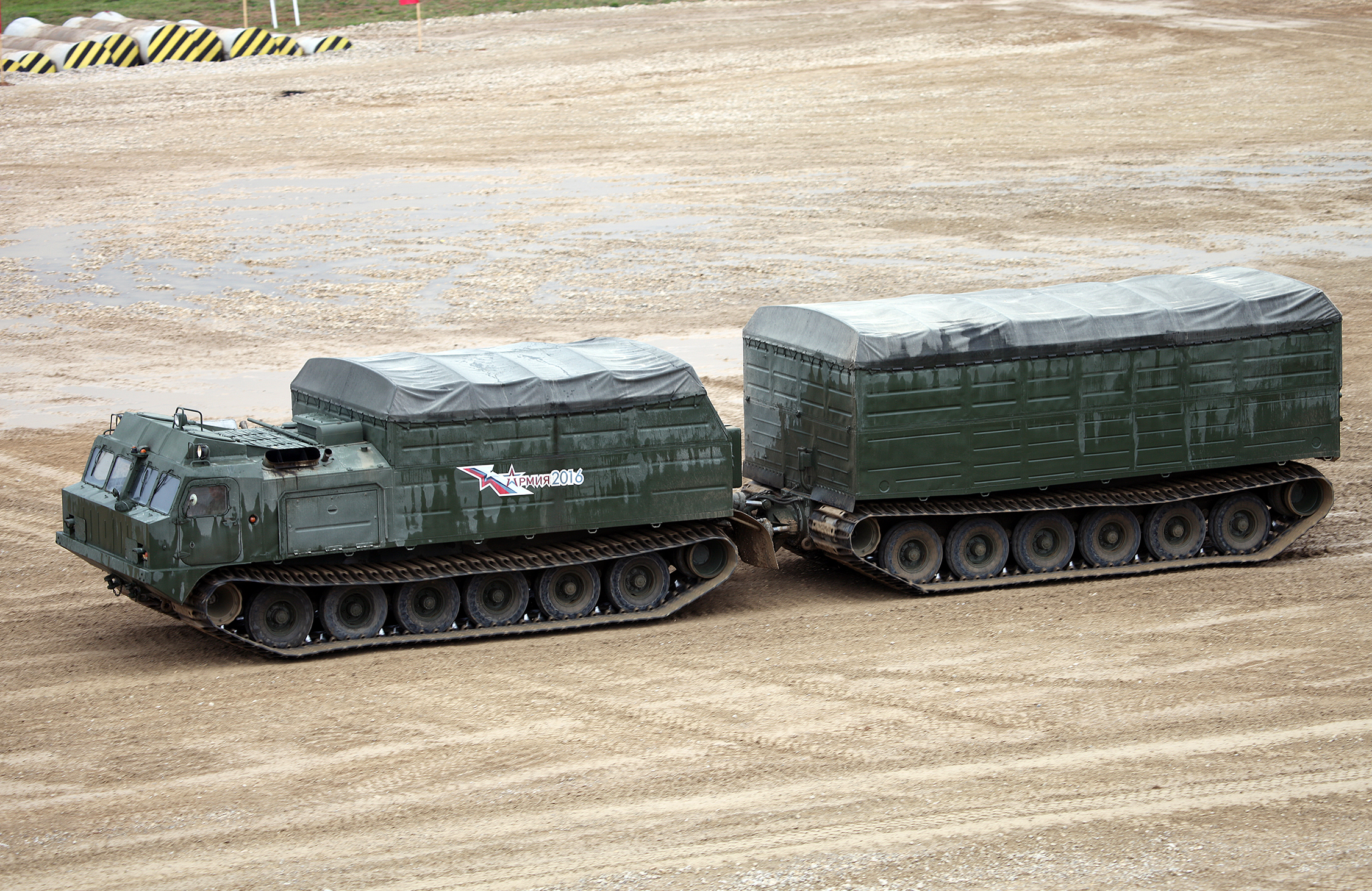
A DT-30P Vityaz ATV at the Army 2016 Demo in Russia.

The transporters models feature similar configuration. Both units are basically sealed all-welded structures. The vehicle power plant is arranged in the first van behind the driver's cabin. From a 12-cylinder multi-fuel engine the torque is conveyed to a hydro-mechanical transmission via a cardan shaft and further to the bevel gearing and final drive units, as well as to the drive sprockets of the first and second van bodies.

The track assembly is made up of four wide rubberised-fabric band tracks reinforced with welded steel cross-pieces; four track guide engagement drive sprockets with nine pairs of polyurethane rollers; road wheels with rubber bands, and four idler wheels (one on either side is provided with a polyurethane rim). The suspension is independent, torsion-bar type, with spring supports on all rollers.

Years of operation of these vehicles have proved their reliability and robust design. The vehicle design primarily features an unconventional pattern of four active track envelopes providing for large surface contact with the ground for greater stability. In addition to this feature, these ATVs ensures the so-called "kinematic method" for turning the articulated tracked vehicle through the "forced folding" of its units. The kinematic method of turn provides a positive tracking force for all tracks during linear movement and while making turns. A combination of the kinematic method of turn and a powerful multifuel engine, along with a hydro-mechanical transmission, unique track and suspension system with wide band tracks, road wheels with rubber pads, and vertical hydraulic cylinders which allow the two vehicle units to move vertically in relation to each other, make the articulated vehicles with a maximum weight of up to 60 tonnes (59 long tons; 66 short tons) more capable in terms of their sand/loose soil/snow-going capacity, than any type of single-unit vehicle.

As the two units can be turned relative to each other in the vertical and horizontal planes via hydraulic cylinders or, conversely, can be fixed, the two-unit vehicle can move over short (equal to the length of one unit) sections of difficult terrain and obstacles like ditches and walls and come out of water onto an unprepared bank, ice, or peat.

Owing to their unique design, the Vityaz family of ATVs are capable of operating in conditions impossible for other all-terrain vehicles, for example:

- amphibious return to a mother ship;
- off-road movement with one unit disabled or without one, or even without both tracks of one of the units;
- negotiating ditches and clefts up to 4 m (13.12 ft) wide.
- unloading of a ship offshore if it cannot come close to waterfront (i.e. in the Arctics and Antarctica regions, or in flooded regions, etc.); negotiating waterways in severe ice conditions;
- operation in mountains up to an altitude of 4,000 m (13,123 ft).

== Military use ==
The DT-10P and DT-30P ATVs are widely used by Russian troops deployed in challenging environmental regions, on islands (for transporting army elements, ammunition, equipment, FOLs and installation of weapon systems). Because of low ground pressure, the vehicle is theoretically immune to certain types of AT mines. ATVs are indispensable as recovery vehicles, since they have a high pull ratio (approximately 500 kN for the DT-30P) and can approach a stuck or damaged vehicle from any direction in bad road conditions. The DT-10P and DT-30P transporters are very efficient as part of search and rescue teams operating in extreme conditions (bad roads, floods, snow-drifts, land and snow slides and large-scale destruction) when it is necessary to evacuate people, animals, and various cargoes up to 30 ton by weight, or transport rescue teams, medical personnel, various equipment and food to the affected area.

Ukrainian forces claimed that two DT-30s were destroyed near Kharkiv during the 2022 Russian invasion of Ukraine. As of December 2024, the Oryx open-source intelligence website lists 1 DT-30 and one DT-10PM as destroyed and a further three DT-30 as captured by Ukrainian forces.

== Variants ==
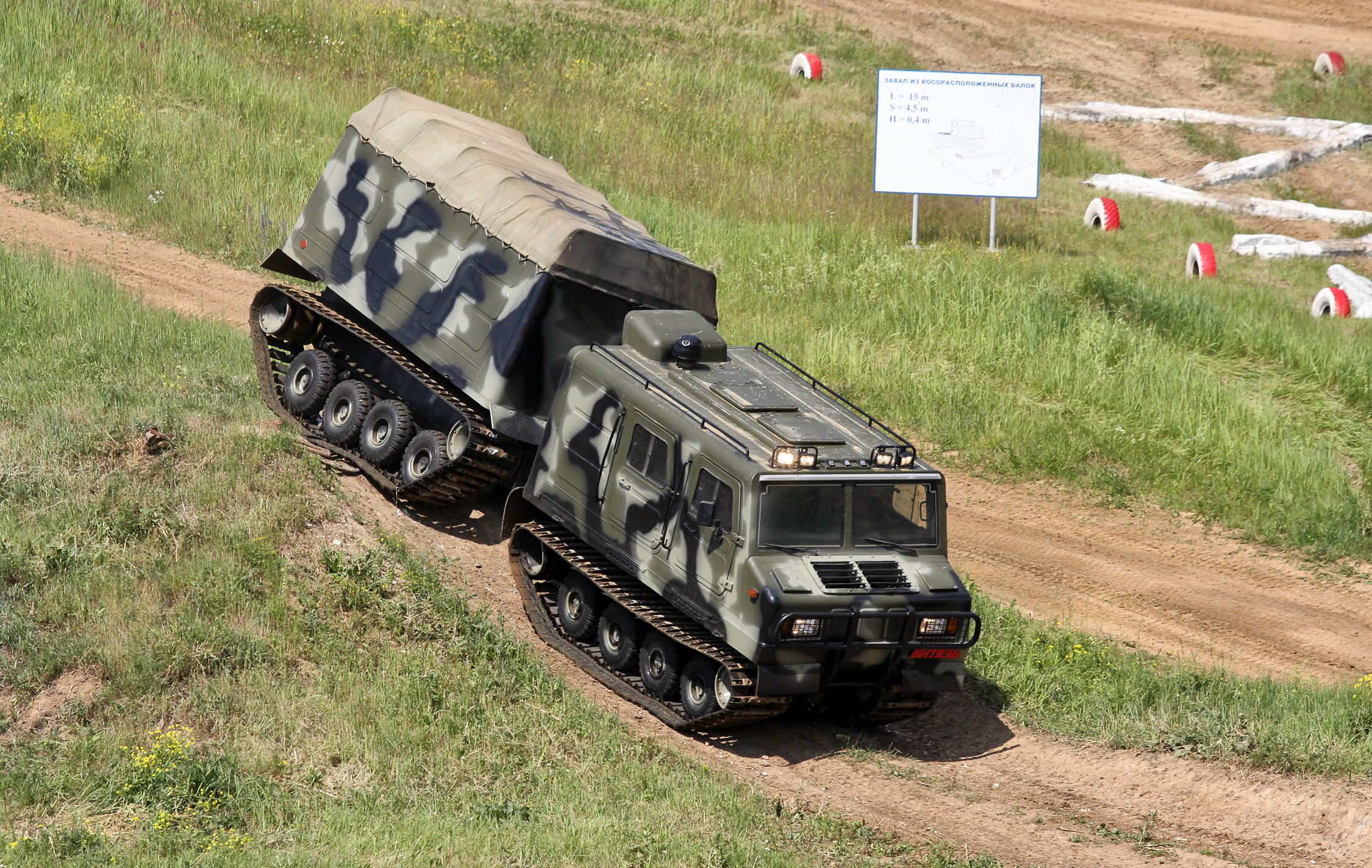
A DT-3P ATV.

=== DT-3 ===
- DT-3 - Base variant.
- DT-3P - Upgrade with more powerful engine.
- DT-3PB - Armored variant fitted with a RCWS.
- DT-3PM - Modernized variant modified to operate in arctic environments.

=== DT-10 ===
- DT-10 - Base variant.
- DT-10P - Upgraded version.
- DT-10PM - Modernization with an improved engine.

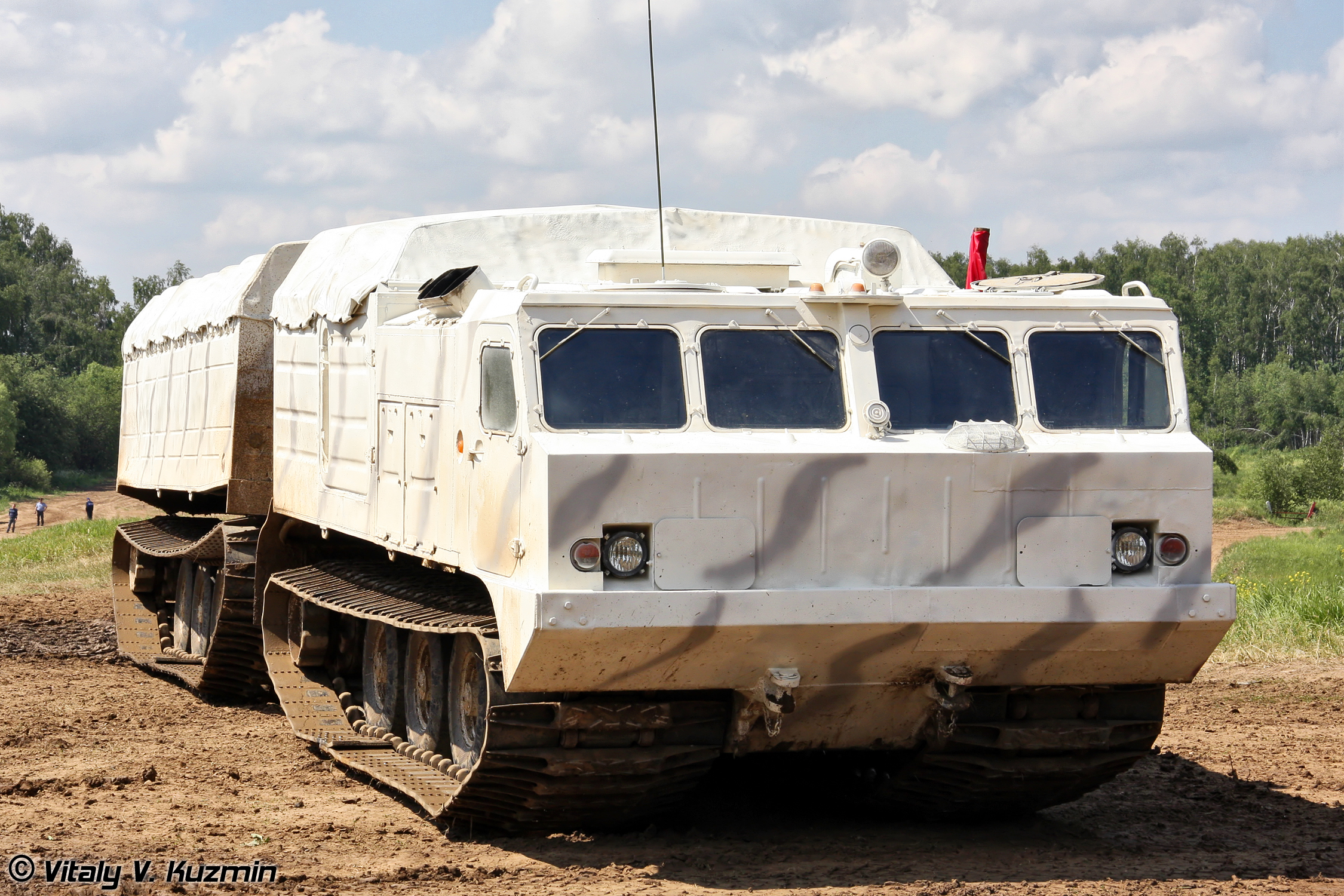
A DT-10P ATV.

=== DT-20 ===
- DT-20 - Base variant.
- DT-20P - Upgraded version.

=== DT-30 ===
- DT-30 - Base variant, non-articulated.
- DT-30P - Articulated carrier with amphibious capabilities.
  - DT-30PM - Upgraded variant of the DT-30P.
- DT-30E - Articulated carrier fitted with excavator.
  - DT-30PE1 - Upgraded version of DT-30E.
- DT-30MNE - Fitted with more advanced hydraulic excavator, the extended front section can accommodate the transportation of up to 12 tons of equipment.
  - DT-30PMNE1 - Upgraded version of DT-30MNE.
- DT-30PK8-1 - Universal drilling equipment suitable for boring wells in permafrost soils, as well as soils containing quicksand.
- DT-30PMN - Variant fitted with the KS-5771 telescopic boom crane system.
- 2S39 Magnolia - DT-30PM with a 2S9 Nona turret mounted on the rear section.
- Pantsir SA - Unknown Vityaz variant, with the radar and missile systems from the Pantsir-S1 mounted on the rear section.
- Tor-M2DT - DT-30PM fitted with the Tor anti-aircraft missile system.

== Operators ==
=== Current operators ===
- Russia
- Ukraine - At least 3 DT-30PMs captured from Russian forces
- Slovakia
  - Fire and Rescue Service of the Slovak Republic

=== Former operators ===
- Soviet Union

=== Civilian operators ===
- Gazprom JSC
- Rosneftegazstroi
- Rosneftegaz JSC

== See also ==
=== Vehicles of similar configuration ===
- Sisu Nasu
- Bronco All Terrain Tracked Carrier
- BAE Systems AB BV206
- BAE Systems AB BvS 210
- Volvo BM Bandvagn 202
