= 2S35 Koalitsiya-SV =

Russian 152 mm self-propelled artillery

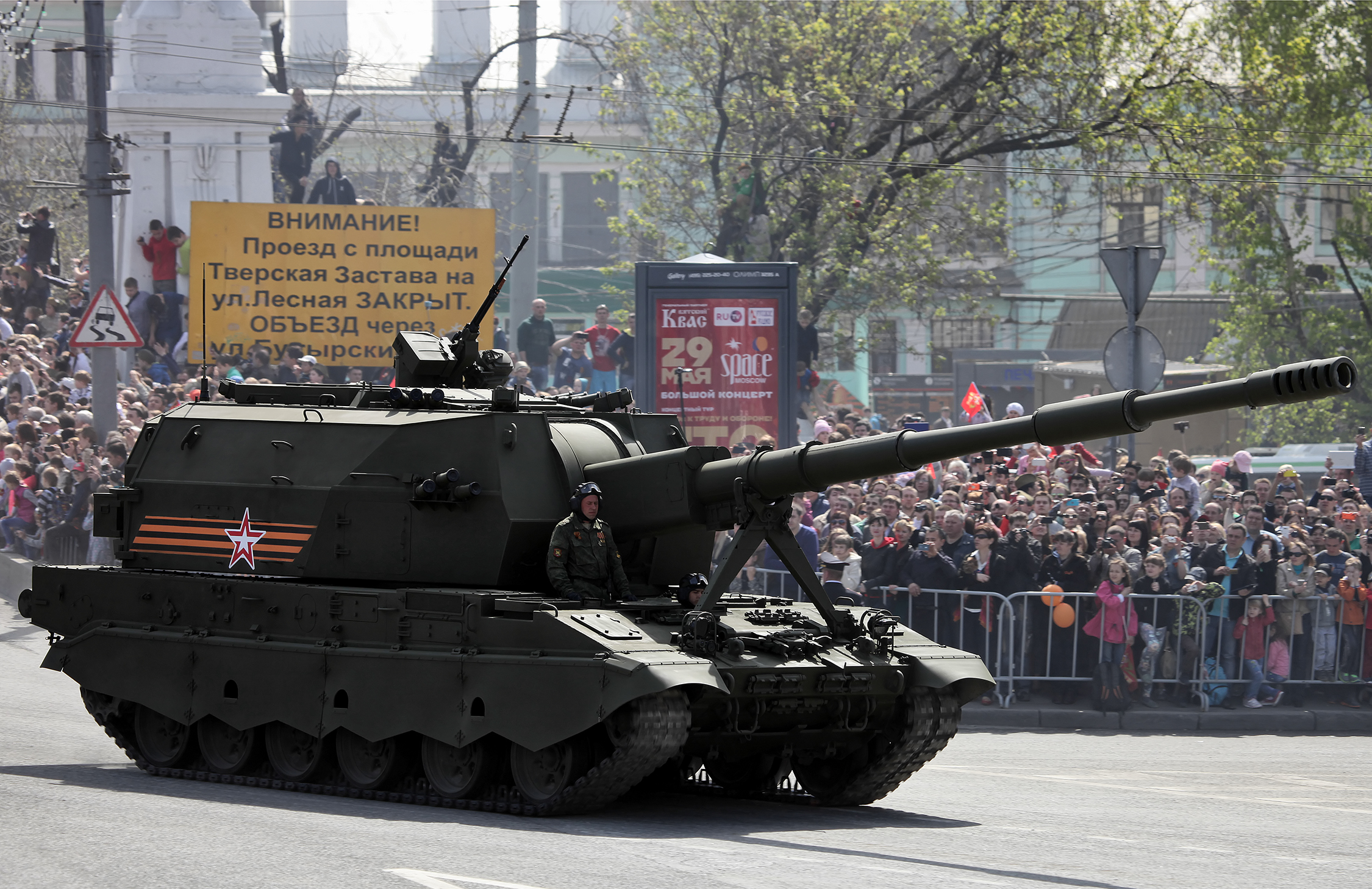
- Russian Army 2S35 Koalitsiya-SV during the 2015 Moscow Victory Day Parade
- Type: Self-propelled gun
- Place of origin: Russia

Service history
- In service: 2023–present
- Used by: Russian Ground Forces
- Wars: Russo-Ukrainian War

Production history
- Designer: Burevestnik Central Scientific Research Institute
- Produced: 2015–present
- No. built: 12+ (serial production ongoing)

Specifications
- Mass: 48 up to 55 tons
- Rate of fire: 16 rounds/min
- Maximum firing range: 80 km (rocket-assisted round)
- Main armament: 152.4 mm or 155 mm gun
- Secondary armament: 12.7 × 108 mm remote controlled Kord machine gun 2 bundles of 902B Tucha smoke grenade launchers
- Engine: Diesel; 1,000 hp

The 2S35 Koalitsiya-SV (Russian: 2С35 «Коалиция-СВ», lit. '"Coalition-SV"') is a Russian self-propelled gun first seen in public (initially with its turret covered) in 2015 during rehearsals for the Moscow Victory Day Parade. The 2S35 is expected to supplement and eventually replace the 2S19 Msta in the Russian Ground Forces.

== Development ==
The 2S35 was originally designed as a variant of the 2S19 Msta, consisting of a 2S19 chassis with modified turret, fitted with two over-and-under dual autoloaded 152 mm howitzers. Development of this variant was abandoned in 2010.

While the dual-gun design was unsuccessful and abandoned after about ten years, the name assigned to that dual-barrel system, Coalition (because it was combining two guns with two full barrels in one unit) was retained. Serial production and original delivery was set for 2016.

In February 2018, twelve 2S35 were undergoing state trials. The defense ministry expected these to be complete by 2020 followed by a decision on serial production.

In August 2021 the defense ministry reported it had signed a contract for serial production with UralTransMash, a subsidiary of UralVagonZavod.

In April 2023 the head of the Missile Forces and Artillery of the Armed Forces announced that the 2S35 was still undergoing state trials and that it had not yet been part of the Russian invasion of Ukraine. State tests were completed on October 20, 2023, which allowed its mass production to be launched.

At the end of 2023, first 2S35s were delivered to the army. According to Sergey Chemezov, the first batch of SPGs that was delivered in late December was from the experimental batch. Serial production is ongoing.

== Design ==
The 2S35 has increased automation that reduced the number of crew members, to perhaps just two or three people located in an armored capsule below the two front hull hatches.

=== Armament ===
Initial reports describe the main armament as a 2A88 152 mm gun with a range of up to 70 to 80 kilometers using precision-guided rounds and up to 40 km with standard rounds that are currently used on Msta-S. The claimed average rate of fire is around 16 rounds per minute (15+) 2S35's rate of fire was improved due to the new pneumatic loader. Estimated ammunition load is around 60-70 rounds and using a special loader vehicle the recharge time for full ammunition load is 15 minutes. The 2S35 will feature a modular ammunition charge system, which allows changing the amount of propellant used in firing of each individual shell. As of 2016 a new precision guided munition was being developed, ensuring accuracy at long distances with deployable rudders and GLONASS navigation.

The secondary armament equipped on 2S35 is a 12.7×108mm ZiD Kord remote weapon station.

=== Unified command-and-control ===
The 2S35 is not a classic self-propelled gun, but rather a highly automated system. The 2S35 has a unified command-and-control system with which all actions are displayed. The system can automatically select the appropriate shell type for a task and the amount of charge required.

The turret is fully digital and can be controlled remotely through the unified command-and-control system. In the future, the turret may be placed on the chassis of the T-14 Armata.

=== Mobility ===
The 2S35 was initially reported as being based on the Armata Universal Combat Platform, which in the case of the T-14 Armata and T-15 has seven road wheels. However, the 2S35s on display during the 2015 Moscow Victory Day Parade and its rehearsals were not built on the Armata platform but rather on a six-wheeled platform that appeared to be a T-90 derived chassis. Later production variants are expected to be based on the unified Armata chassis.

== Combat Use ==
According to Fedor Gromov, one of Russian military bloggers, in the summer of 2022 immediately after the Battle of Lysychansk he saw Koalitsiya SPGs being used in combat in that area. He also spoke to the crew of the howitzer. According to him, a total of 2 batteries of 3 howitzers each were used at that time, with units acting as "fire crews", constantly moved from place to place, and never staying anywhere for more than a couple of days.

== Image gallery ==
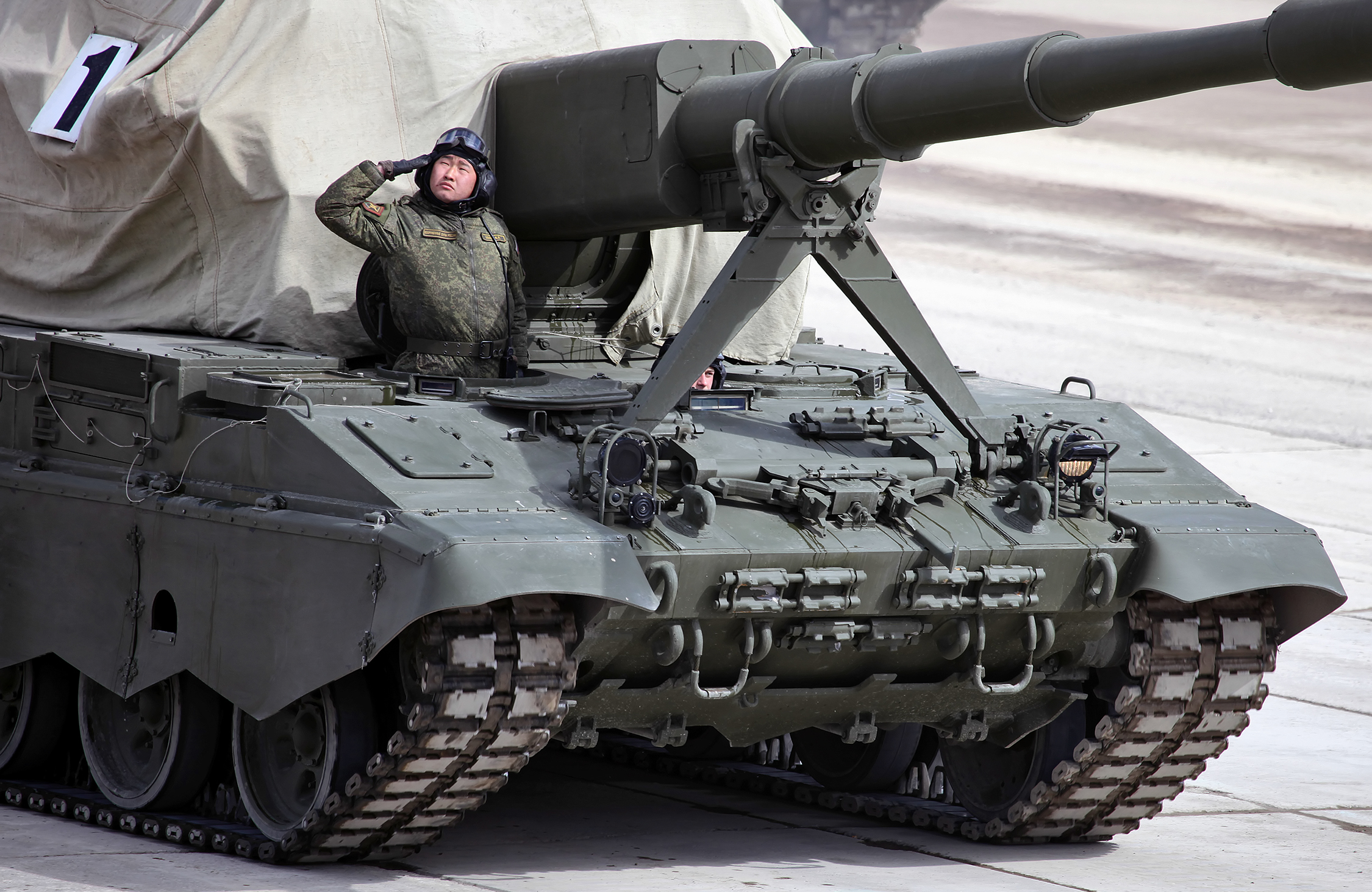
Close-up of the front

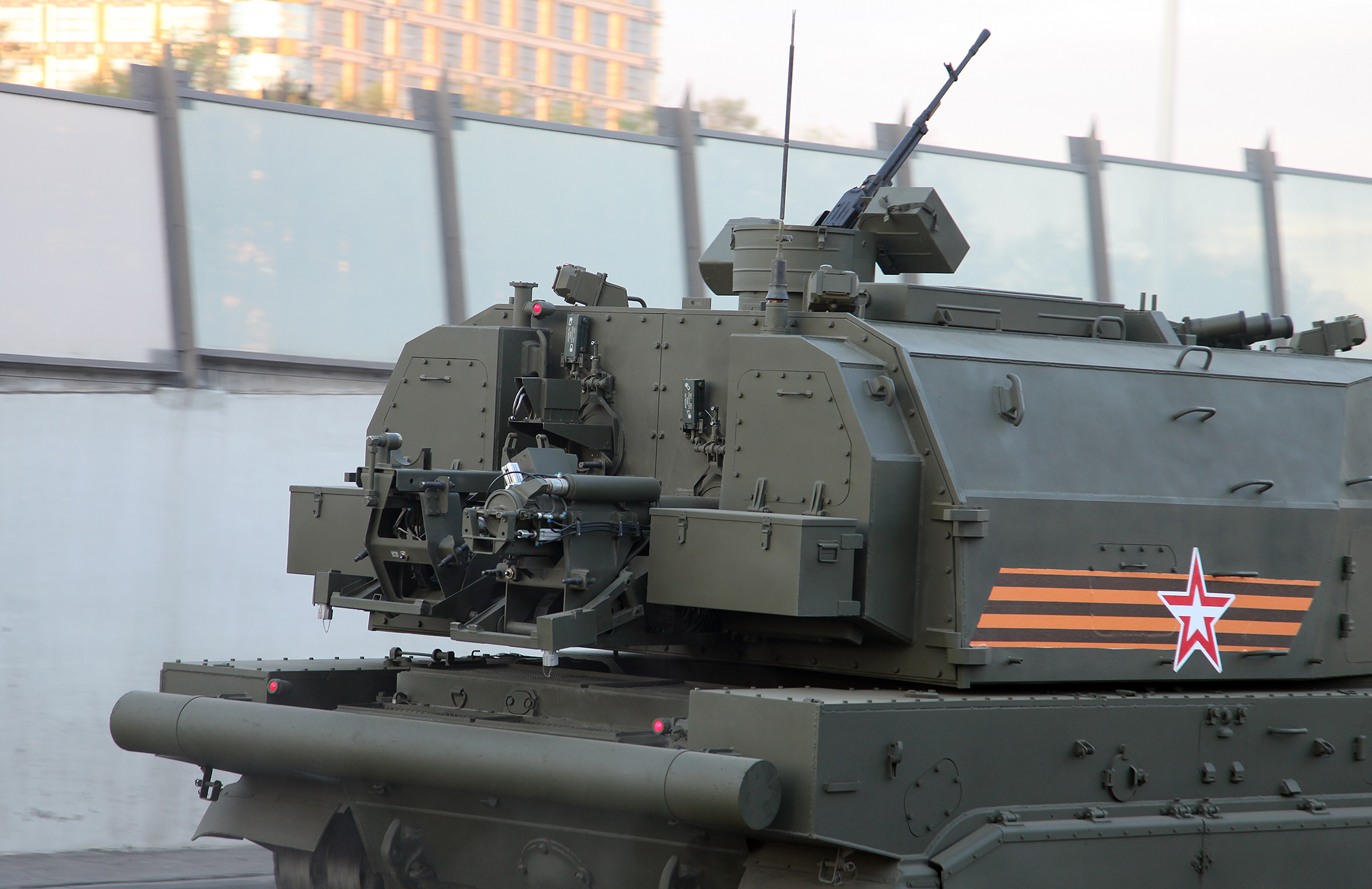
Close-up of the rear

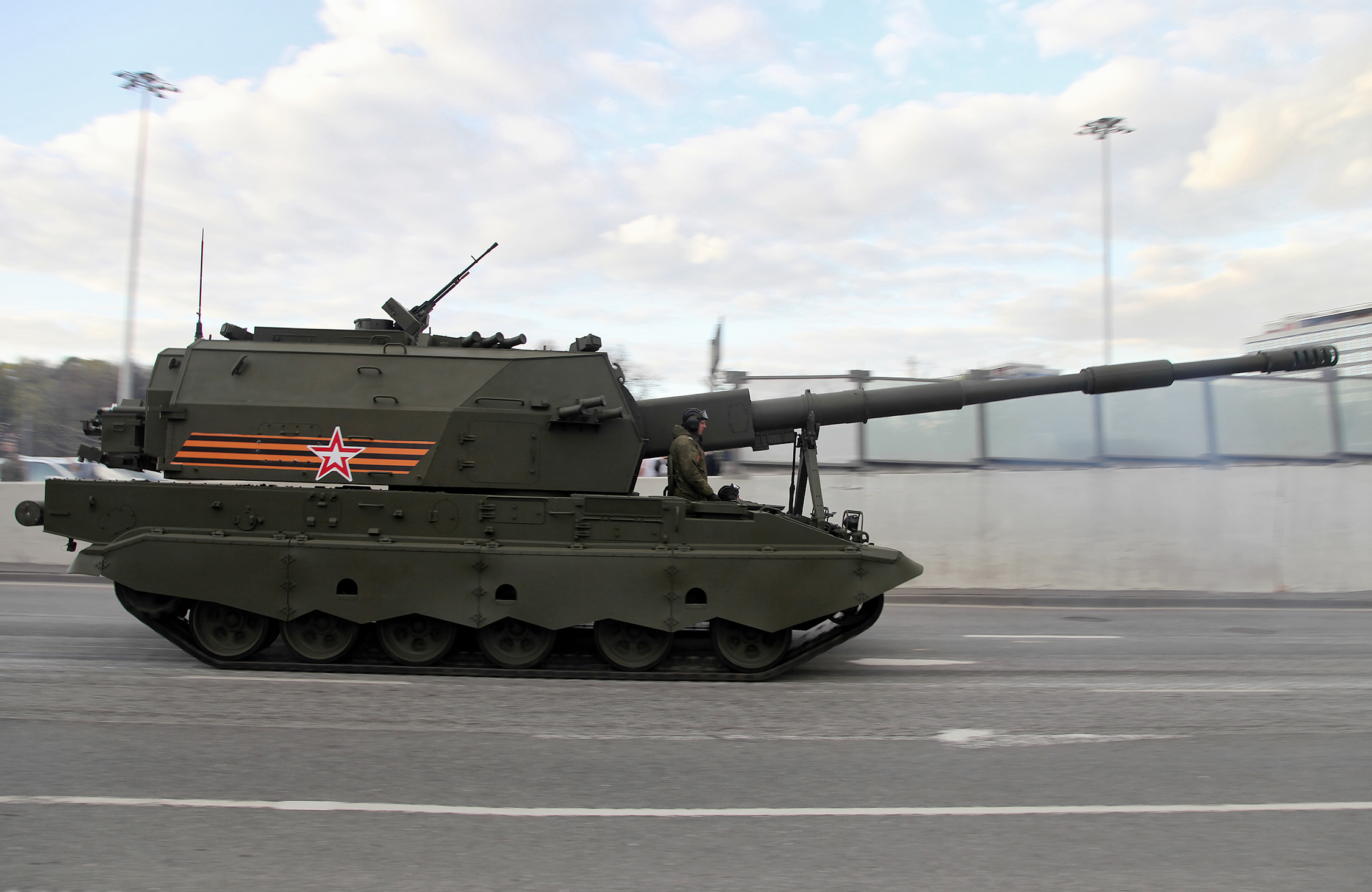
Side view

== See also ==
- 2S19 Msta-S – (Soviet Union, Russia)
- 2S3 Akatsiya – (Soviet Union)
- AS-90 – (United Kingdom)
- K9 Thunder – (South Korea)
- M1299 howitzer – (United States)
- Panzerhaubitze 2000 – (Germany)
- PLZ-05 – (China)
- XM2001 Crusader – (United States)
- AHS Krab – (Poland)
