= Ukrainian penal military units during the Russian invasion of Ukraine =

Prisoners in the Ukrainian Armed Forces

In early 2024, Ukraine began to mobilize convicts into the Ukrainian Army similarly to how Russia had allegedly been doing so earlier in the war.

== Background ==
On 28 February 2022, Ukrainian President Volodmry Zelenskyy offered to release prisoners with combat experience if they joined the fight against Russia. Foreign volunteers with criminal records have also been allowed to enlist in the International Legion. In February 2025, Patrick Messmer, a Swiss volunteer in the Legion, told Swiss media that 30% of the International Legion's members have a criminal record.

In early 2024, the Verkhovna Rada passed Registered draft law No. 11079 which allowed for the mobilization of convicts into the Ukrainian Army. This was due to the Ukrainian conscription crisis which was causing a shortage in new recruits to replace losses. Draft dodgers further exacerbated the manpower issue.

== Structure ==
Per Ukrainian Minister of Justice of Ukraine Denys Maliuska, all convicts will be put into separate "Assault units". The convicts will then be put in units known as "Shkval Battalion" and attached to other units. According to a representative from the 47th Mechanized Brigade, convicts "serve exclusively in a separate unit of the brigade and do not intersect with mechanized battalions." Prisoners who are excluded from the joining include: Those who have committed two or more intentional murders, rapists, pedophiles, terrorism, treason, corruption or drug abuse. However, the Shkval Battalion of the 59th Assault Brigade told reporters that they are making legal requests in order to allow more murders of various degrees to join their ranks. According a report dated July 2025 from the Ukrainian State Criminal Executive Service, of the convicts serving in the Ukrainian Armed Forces, 55% were convicted of property related crimes, 11% were convicted of drug related crimes, 9% were convicted of assault which caused Bodily harm, 6% were convicted for causing traffic accidents that resulted in injuries, and 6% were convicted of murder. Soldiers who are convicted of desertion also have the opportunity to serve in Shkval battalions. Convicts are reported to have the opportunity to receive parole on the condition that they serve until the end of the war. According to "Cupo" a female convict who joined the Shkval Battalion of the 59th Assault Brigade, "many of the convicts will not last so long" due to convicts having to face high-risk tasks in the most dangerous areas of the front line.

== Number of convicts ==
By 2 April 2025, over 8,000 convicts were reported to be serving in the Ukrainian Armed Forces according to the head of the Department for the Execution of Sentences of the Ministry of Justice Yevhen Horobets. On 8 May 2025, according to Deputy Minister of Justice of Ukraine Yevhen Pikalov, more than 8,300 convicts had been mobilized and another 1,000 convicts were in the process of being mobilized. Pikalov also stated that there are plans to mobilize 20% to 30% of Ukraine's prisoner population before the end of 2025. On 22 July 2025 according to the Ukrainian State Criminal Executive Service, 9,400 male convicts and 100 female convicts had volunteered for service in the Ukrainian Armed Forces. By 19 December 2025, over 11,000 convicts had voluntarily joined the ranks of the Ukrainian Army per the State Criminal Executive Service of Ukraine. Per the Ukrainian Ministry of Justice, around 12,000 had joined the Ukrainian Army by 12 March 2026.

== Treatment ==
If a member of a penal unit would attempt to desert or retreat without authorisation, an additional 5 to 10 years would be added to their sentence. Protection for Prisoners of Ukraine leader Oleg Tsvily said that his organization "supports the idea behind the law but the text that was passed is discriminatory". He also raised concerns about convicts being abused by their commanders and used as cannon fodder saying, "Some commanders treat even ordinary mobilised people badly, why would it be different for prisoners?" Per the draft law, convicts cannot be discharged or transferred to other positions even if they are wounded with the draft law specifically stating that the only right that a former convict in the Ukrainian Army has is to go on the assault. According to Ukrainian news outlet Rubryka, convicts do not have the same right of access to medical care and social support that regular soldiers do. Per a study by The Pryncyp Human Rights Center titled "Service in the Shkval Battalion," convicts are not allowed to be discharged from service even after being released from Russian captivity or after turning 60. They are also not allowed to take an annual leave and only have limited opportunities for promotions. Some convicts said that they had only had 20 days of training before being sent to the frontline. A Ukrainian officer claimed in a post on Telegram that a Shkval Battalion in Kursk had been thrown into assaults with no professional military training and no coordination with the other units which resulted in heavy losses. One member of a Shkval battalion who was identified as "Vitaliy R", a convict who was serving a sentence of 6 years and 6 months for theft, joined a Shkval battalion in May 2024 but later deserted in July 2024. On 30 July 2024, he was detained in Mykolaiv. During his trial, "Vitaliy R" claimed that the commander of the unit he was in treated members of the unit's Shkval battalion "badly" and threatened them with weapons. On 23 December 2024, "Vitaliy R" was sentenced to 8 years in prison for desertion. According to a convict with the call sign "K", Ukrainian high command, "did not care too much about the needs of subordinates and ignored the problems in the battalion."

According to an investigation by Ukrainian journalist Anna Kaliuzhna, the 225th Separate Assault Regiment's commanding officer Oleh Shyriaiev gave orders in both text and video form during the Kursk offensive which told soldiers of the regiment to treat deserters as the enemy and to shoot them on sight. According to accounts from soldiers of the regiment, many of who were from the unit's penal battalion, said that they were threatened with being shot if they retreated. They also told Kaliuzhna that soldiers of the 225th Assault Regiment's penal battalion were held against their will and beaten in basements which were used as makeshift prisons. Some soldiers were also reported to have been tied to the "tree of turth" and beaten. During the investigation, Shyriaiev claimed that he was referring to Russian soldiers disguising themselves with Ukrainian uniforms.

== Issues ==
During an interview with UNN, a Ukrainian officer with the callsign "Kit" praised the motivation of the convicts of the 47th Mechanized Brigade's Shkval Battalion but also said there were "issues with their upbringing." According to a convict with the call sign "K" who was serving in a Shkval Battalion, the other convicts of his unit "behaved badly" and that the "cases of theft of things from military personnel became widespread." According to Sudovo-Yurydychna gazeta (also known as sud.ua), "There are frequent cases of bringing Shkval servicemen to justice for criminal offenses committed outside of military service. These are, according to court verdicts, theft, robbery, illegal possession of a vehicle, acquisition and storage of narcotic substances, intentional infliction of bodily harm, fraud, illegal storage or sale of firearms and ammunition."

== Attempts to address issues ==
On 14 July 2026, the Ukrainian parliament passed law No. 15225, which grants convicts serving in the Ukrainian Armed Forces the same rights as other Ukrainian servicemen. Per the new law, convicts serving in the Ukrainian Armed Forces now have the right to an annual leave, the ability to request additional recovery time after being released from Russian captivity or after being wounded, and the ability to transfer to the Territorial Center of Recruitment and Social Support or other rear-line positions if medically unfit. Female convicts serving in the Ukrainian Armed Forces also now have the ability to request for maternity leave and childcare leave.

== Shkval units ==
As of 2026, there are 24 Shkval units in the Ukrainian Armed Forces. 21 are attached to the Ukrainian Ground Forces, 2 are attached to the Ukrainian Marine Corps, and 1 is attached to the Main Directorate of Intelligence of Ukraine. While the Kharakternyky Battalion of the 24th Mechanized Brigade is also a penal unit, it is not classified as a Shkval Battalion.

- Shkval Battalion (also known as the 5th Shkval Assault Battalion) of the 1st Assault Regiment
- Shkval Battalion of the 3rd Assault Brigade
- Shkval Battalion of the 5th Assault Brigade
- Shkval Battalion of the 10th Mountain Assault Brigade
- Shkval Company of the 21st Mechanized Brigade
- Shkval Battalion of the 28th Mechanized Brigade
- Shkval Assault Company of the 33rd Assault Regiment
- Shkval Company of the 35th Marine Brigade
- Shkval Battalion of the 36th Marine Brigade
- Shkval Battalion (nicknamed Squall Battalion) of the 47th Mechanized Brigade
- Shkval Battalion of the 56th Motorized Brigade
- Shkval Battalion of the 57th Motorized Brigade
- Shkval Battalion (nicknamed Wind Gust Battalion) of the 59th Assault Brigade
- Shkval Battalion of the 67th Mechanized Brigade
- Shkval Company of the 72nd Mechanized Brigade
- Shkval Battalion of the 92nd Assault Brigade
- Shkval Battalion (nicknamed Alcatraz Battalion) of the 93rd Mechanized Brigade
- Shkval Company (also known as Special Purpose Rifle Company “Shkval”) of the 127th Heavy Mechanized Brigade
- Shkval Battalion of the 129th Heavy Mechanized Brigade
- Shkval Company (also known as the Shkval Special Purpose Company) of the 141st Mechanized Brigade
- Shkval Battalion (also known as the Morok Assault Group) of the 225th Assault Regiment
- Shkval Company of the 253rd Assault Regiment
- Shkval Battalion (nicknamed Artan X) of the Artan Special Unit
- Shkval Battalion of the Skala Regiment

== See also ==
- Russian penal military units during the Russian invasion of Ukraine
- Kharakternyky Battalion (24th Mechanized Brigade)
