= 155th Mechanized Brigade =

Ukrainian Ground Forces unit

- 155 окрема механізована бригада
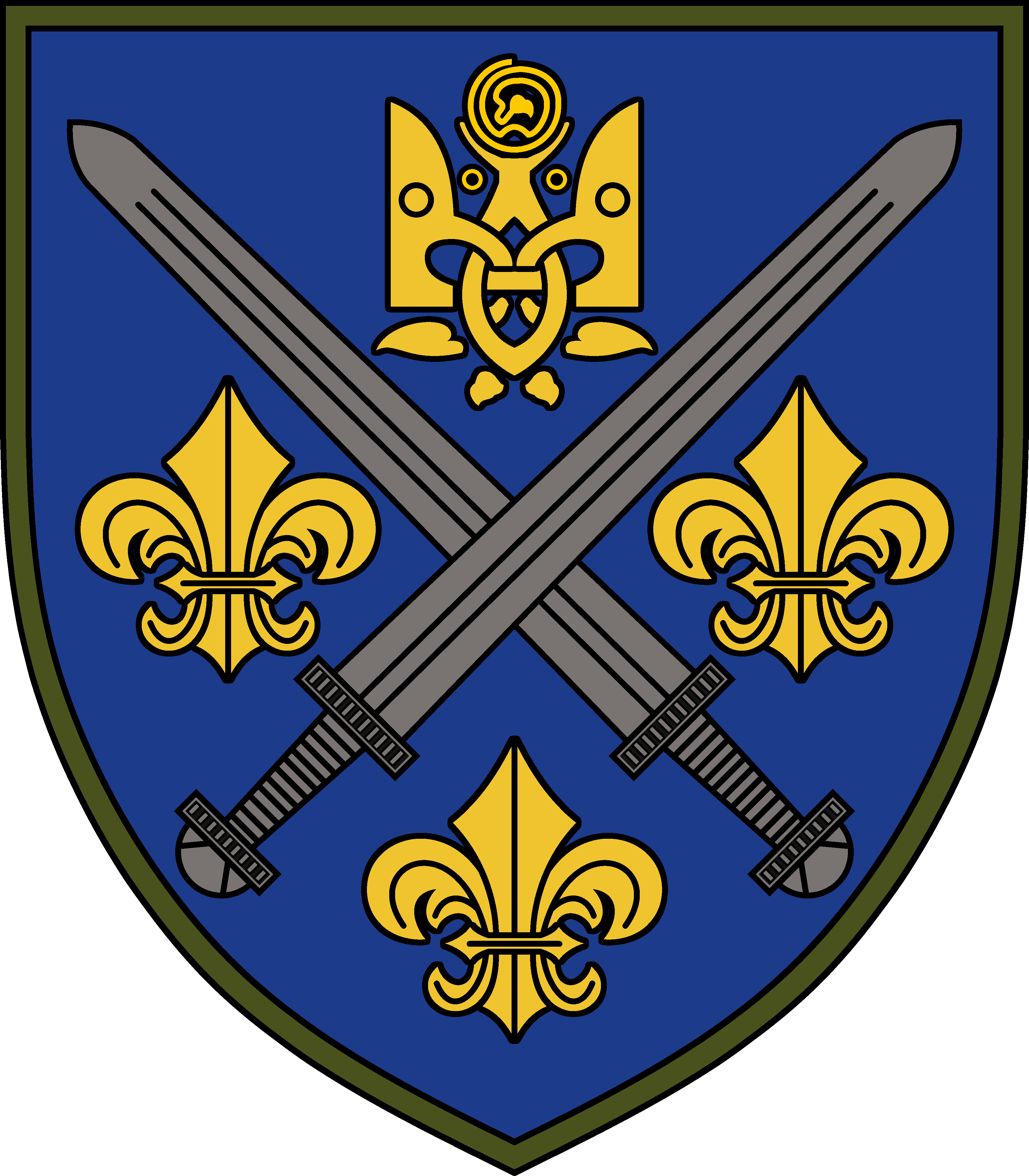
- Shoulder sleeve insignia
- Active: March 1, 2024 – present
- Country: Ukraine
- Branch: Ukrainian Ground Forces
- Type: Mechanized Infantry
- Size: 5,800
- Part of: Operational Command North
- Garrison/HQ: Mala Lyubasha, Rivne Oblast
- Nickname: Anne of Kyiv Brigade
- Patron: Anne of Kyiv
- Motto: They shall not pass
- Engagements: Russo-Ukrainian war; Pokrovsk offensive
- Website: Official Facebook page

Commanders
- Notable commanders: Colonel Dmytro Ryumshin

Insignia
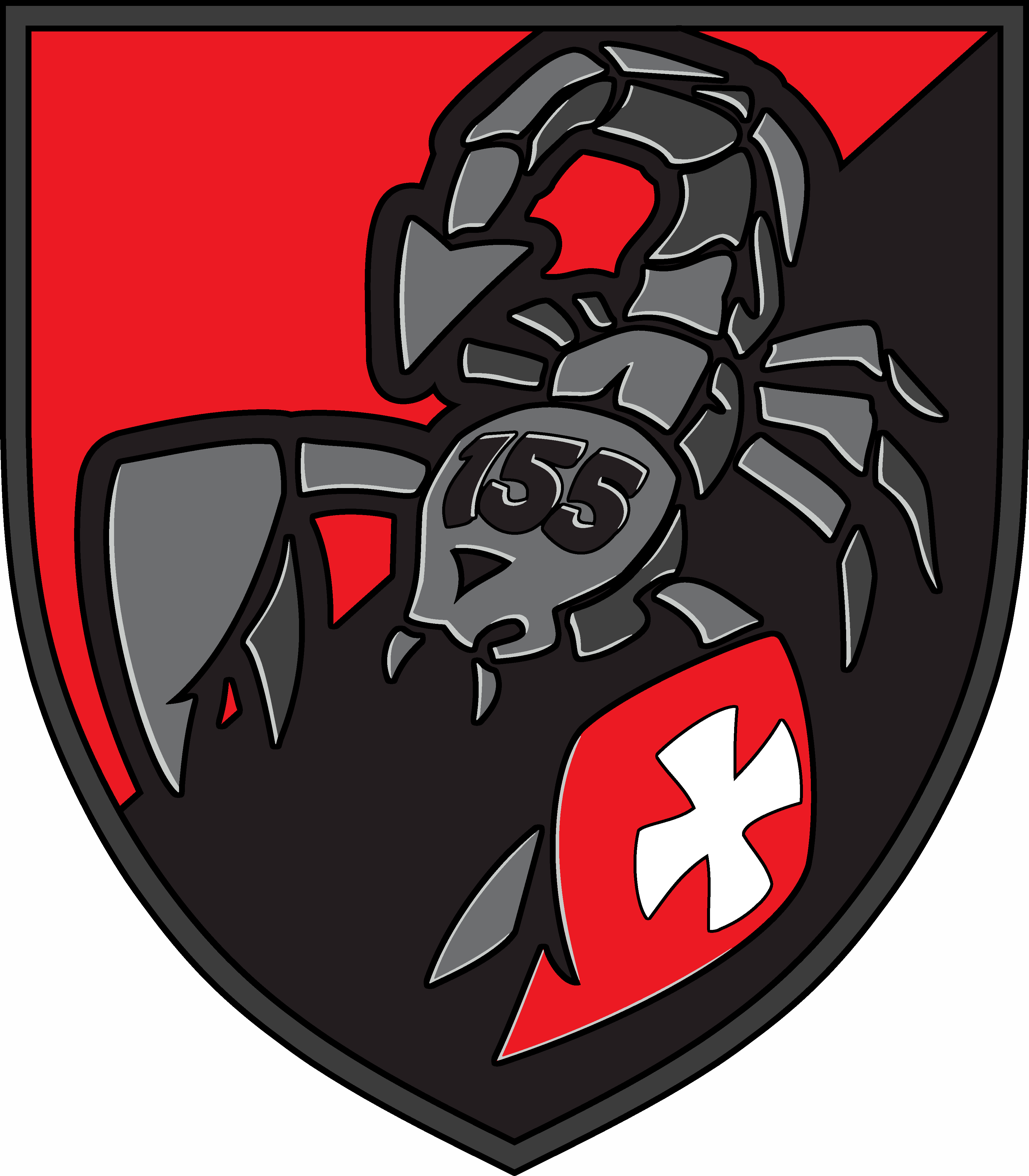
- Former insignia

The 155th Mechanized Brigade (Ukrainian: 155 окрема механізована бригада) is a brigade of the Ukrainian Ground Forces formed in 2024 and partially trained in France. In January 2025, it became the subject of controversy after it was reported that around 1,700 members of the brigade had gone AWOL during its formation, which led to the arrest of the brigade commander.

== History ==
=== Formation ===
The 155th Infantry Brigade was formed in 2024 as part of an initiative to expand the Ukrainian Ground Forces with the creation of nine additional brigades. This effort, announced by Commander Oleksandr Pavliuk, was a direct response to the ongoing Russo-Ukrainian war. The brigade is known by the nickname "Anne of Kyiv" after the princess who married French King Henry I at Reims cathedral to become Queen of France from 1051 to 1060.

The formation of the brigade began in March 2024. The brigade was created under the provisions of a Ukrainian mobilization law, which lowered the draft age from 27 to 25 and introduced penalties for draft evasion. The law also allowed convicts to join the armed forces. The existence of the 155th Infantry Brigade was officially acknowledged on 8 May 2024, marking it as the first of the newly announced brigades to take shape. Rivne city council supported the brigade by donating equipment to meet the soldiers' needs during its early stages of formation.

=== Training in France and Poland ===
The brigade was officially announced in France during the 80th anniversary of the D-Day landings attended by Ukrainian president Volodymyr Zelenskyy on June 6, 2024. By November 2024, the first wave of 2,000 soldiers had undergone training in eastern France (Camp de Châlons), with plans for the brigade to eventually grow to a strength of 4,500 troops. Its training and equipping were carried out under a European Union-funded program that had already trained 60,000 Ukrainian troops. France played a pivotal role, providing extensive training, equipment, and weaponry. This included 18 CAESAR self-propelled howitzers, 18 AMX-10RC armored fighting vehicles, and 128 VAB armored personnel carriers. In October, the brigade was visited and inspected by French President Emmanuel Macron. The brigade returned to Ukraine in November, along with its integral Leopard 2A4-based tank battalion trained in Poland.

=== Pokrovsk offensive and desertions ===
In November 2024, the 155th Brigade was deployed south of Pokrovsk to help hold positions including Shevchenko. It reportedly suffered heavy losses during its first few days of combat. It had been split and its elements assigned to the experienced brigades fighting in the same area, the 25th Airborne Brigade and the 68th Jaeger Brigade.

On 14 December, Ukrainian journalist Yurii Butusov brought attention to the problems within the brigade in a report on his YouTube channel, which was followed up with an article published on 31 December 2024. According to this article, the brigade had suffered from serious organizational problems since its inception. Operational Command West, responsible for the formation of the brigade, lacked the resources, manpower and command staff needed to create a new unit. The manning of the brigade started only in June, but in July and August more than 2,550 soldiers were taken away to replenish other units, effectively negating four months of work. By the time the brigade was sent to France for training in October, there were 935 instances of soldiers being AWOL, and 50 soldiers are known to have deserted in France.

The latter raised questions among the French leadership, which prompted the Ukrainian Stavka to launch an investigation by the Ukrainian SBI to determine who is responsible for the desertions. As a result, the brigade commander, Colonel Dmytro Ryumshin, was removed from his post just days after returning from France on November 30 (other sources state that Ryumshin left command on December 12). While the brigade command was in France, 700 more newly recruited men stationed in Ukraine went AWOL without ever seeing their commanders. After the removal of the commander, the Ukrainian commander-in-chief Oleksandr Syrskyi sent a commission consisting of the OC West commander Volodymyr Shvediuk and chief of staff Oleksandr Seletsky to improve the combat effectiveness of the brigade. On 30 December, Seletsky died, reportedly from a heart attack. Additional 198 men went AWOL during the first week of December. The Kyiv Post reported that by 4 January 2025, the brigade had reassigned all of its CAESAR self-propelled howitzers, most of its VAB APCs, and a portion of its Leopard 2 tanks to other Ukrainian formations.

The Ukrainian General Staff reported on 7 January that the 155th Mechanized Brigade was conducting combat operations on the Pokrovsk front, having been reinforced with drones and additional equipment. Measures had been taken to improve discipline and reduce desertions. Major General Mykhailo Drapatiy, Commander of the Ukrainian Ground Forces, admitted on 8 January that the problems in the 155th Brigade were real, but that he was confident the brigade would become combat-effective. Commander-in-Chief Oleksandr Syrskyi visited the positions of the 155th Brigade on the Pokrovsk front on 23 January and said that the situation in the brigade was gradually improving after reports of desertions, poor command and training.

In February 2025 the 155th Brigade was still deployed south of Pokrovsk. In an interview on 5 March an officer of the Brigade claimed that they continued to hold the north-western part of Shevchenko and that the Russians were unable to break through the Ukrainian defences due to the significant losses inflicted by the brigade. By 14 March, Ukrainian forces had reportedly gradually regained control of settlements near Pokrovsk, with the 155th Brigade supporting the 425th Separate Assault Regiment in recapturing part, if not most, of Shevchenko.

=== Arrest of Commander ===
On 20 January 2025, former brigade commander Dmytro Ryumshin was detained by the SBI and charged with inaction of the military authorities committed under martial law, which is punishable by imprisonment for up to 10 years. The SBI stated that Ryumshin failed to inform law enforcement authorities of a significant number of AWOL cases and didn't take measures to prevent them. In particular, the colonel unreasonably included unmotivated men in the lists of persons scheduled for training in France, some of whom were previously detained for trying to illegally cross the border of Ukraine. On 6 February 2025, Ryumshin's bail was reduced from 90 million hryvnias (2,160,980 USD) to 50 million hryvnias (US$1,200,540).

=== Beating of Serhiy Malenko ===
On 1 May 2026, a serviceman of the 210th Battalion named Anatoly Rudenko verbally mocked a soldier from the 155th Brigade named Serhiy Malenko before pulling him out of formation and beating him until he fell unconscious. According to investigators, Rudenko also tied up Malenko and continued to beat him while he was still unconscious. Malenko was later hospitalized with a closed head injury, concussion, bruises, and multiple hematomas. A video of the beating was uploaded online on 4 May 2026. In the video, Rudenko strikes a tied up Malenko in the head while a dozen other soldiers lined up in formation watch. Rudenko then Malenko tells to kiss the feet of the 210th Battalion's commander. According to Malenko's sister, Malenko was later was doing construction work at a training ground between May 2 and May 4 despite having a concussion and that he only received medical aid on May 4 after the video of the beating went public. On 7 May 2026, Security Service of Ukraine reported that they had detained Rudenko in Dnipropetrovsk Oblast.

=== Murder of civilians and arrest of another commander ===
In July 2026, nine members of the brigade, including a battalion commander, were arrested on suspicion of abducting and murdering two civilians from Kyiv Oblast. Stanislav Luchanov, former chief of staff of the 425th Assault Regiment, who was appointed the brigade commander in February 2026 and allegedly ordered the murders, went AWOL and was detained on 13 July. The Operational Command North reported that he was removed from his post.

== Structure ==
The brigade's structure was as follows:

- 155th Mechanized Brigade
  - Brigade's Headquarters
  - 1st Mechanized Battalion
  - 2nd Mechanized Battalion
  - 3rd Mechanized Battalion
  - 1st Motorized Battalion
  - 1st Rifle Battalion
  - Tank Battalion
  - Drone Battalion Manticora
  - Reconnaissance Company
  - Artillery Group
  - Anti-Aircraft Defense Battalion
  - Engineer Battalion
  - CBRN Protection Company
  - Medical Company
  - Logistic Battalion
  - Maintenance Battalion
  - Radar Company
  - Signal Company

== See also ==
- 156th Mechanized Brigade
- 157th Mechanized Brigade
- 158th Mechanized Brigade
- 159th Mechanized Brigade
- 160th Mechanized Brigade
