= 15th Army Corps (Ukraine) =

Ukrainian Ground Forces formation

- 15-й армійський корпус
- Insignia of the corps
- Active: March 2025 – present
- Country: Ukraine
- Branch: Ukrainian Ground Forces
- Size: Corps
- Garrison/HQ: Rivne Oblast
- Motto: Strength in Unity
- Engagements: Russo-Ukrainian War
- Website: Official Facebook page

Commanders
- Current commander: Brig. Gen. Ruslan Shevchuk

The 15th Army Corps (Ukrainian: 15-й армійський корпус) is a Corps of the Ukrainian Ground Forces.

== History ==
The 15th Army Corps is a military unit formed as part of Ukraine's ongoing defense reforms. These reforms aim to improve command structures and operational readiness after the Russian invasion of Ukraine (2022).

The insignia of the 15th Army Corps utilised a blend of Latin Roman and Ukrainian Cossack cultural lore. At the top is a silver (argent) Cossack cross on a red (gules) field as seen in the flag of the Zaporizhzhian Sich, and modern Volyn Oblast. Below it are the entangled Roman numerals "X" (10, in gold, or) and "V" (5, in silver, argent), referring to the 15th Army Corps, with a V-shaped green (vert) space in between. The slogan above the shield in gold on a green field is the Latin phrase Ex unitate vires ("from unity, strength", officially translated as "Strength in Unity"), the initials of which could also be read in the entanglement of the numerals below: "eX Vnitate Vires." The remaining field under the numerals is also green.

== Structure ==
As of 2026 the corps structure is as follows:

- 15th Army Corps
  - Corps Headquarters
    - Management
    - Command Platoon
  - 1st Territorial Defense Brigade
  - 10th Mountain Assault Brigade
  - 44th Artillery Brigade
  - 96th Anti-Tank Battalion
  - 114th Territorial Defense Brigade
  - 121st Reconnaissance Battalion
  - 129th Heavy Mechanized Brigade
  - 130th Reconnaissance Battalion
  - 130th Communications Battalion
  - 143rd Mechanized Brigade
  - 144th Mechanized Brigade
  - 158th Mechanized Brigade
  - 162nd Command Reconnaissance Point
  - 434th Battalion of Unmanned Systems
  - 1220th Support Battalion
  - Chernihiv Border Detachment
