= 93rd Mechanized Brigade =

Ukrainian Ground Forces unit

93rd Mechanized Brigade "Kholodnyi Yar"
- 93-тя окрема механізована бригада «Холодний Яр» 93 okrema mekhanizovana bryhada "Kholodnyi Yar"
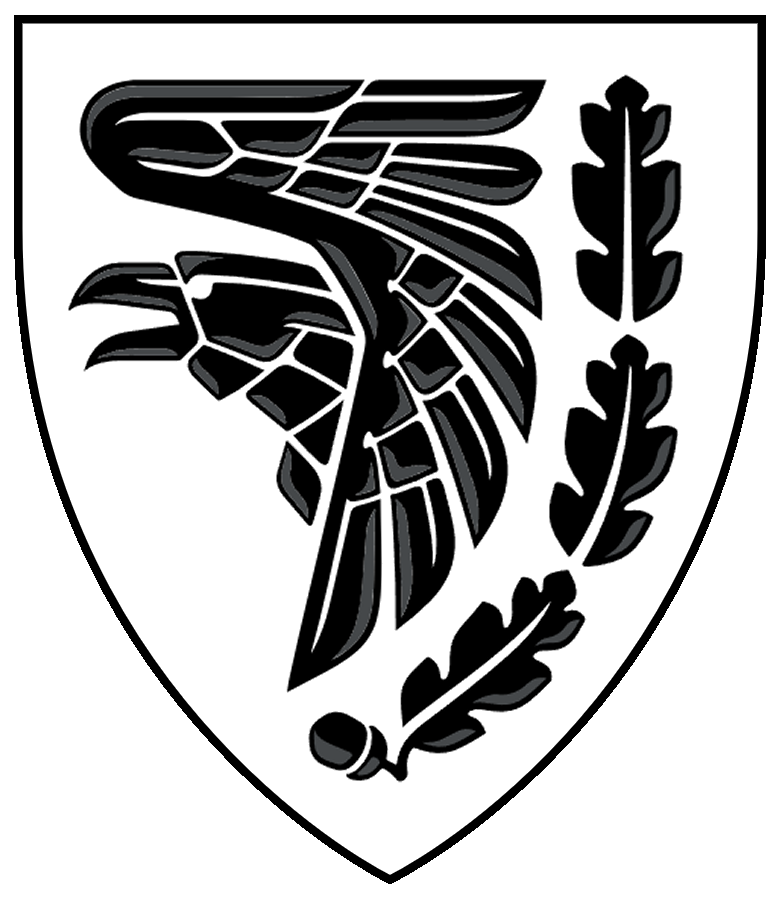
- Brigade insignia
- Active: January 1, 1992 – present
- Country: Ukraine
- Branch: Ukrainian Ground Forces
- Type: Mechanized Infantry
- Size: 3,000 (June 2023)
- Part of: Operational Command East
- Garrison/HQ: Cherkaske, Dnipropetrovsk Oblast
- Nicknames: 'Kholodnyi Yar' (Official) 'Cyborgs' (Unofficial)
- Motto: "Never Backwards!"
- Engagements: Russo-Ukrainian war; War in Donbas; Battle of Ilovaisk; Second Battle of Donetsk Airport; Battle of Debaltseve; Battle of Marinka; Battle of Avdiivka; Russian invasion of Ukraine; Eastern Ukraine campaign; Battle of Kharkiv; Battle of Sumy; Battle of Bakhmut; 2023 Ukrainian counteroffensive; Battle of Chasiv Yar
- Decorations: For Courage and Bravery
- Website: Official Facebook page

Commanders
- Current commander: Col. Shamil Krutkov (2024 – present)
- Notable commanders: Col. Ruslan Shevchuk (January 21, 2021 – 2023); Col. Pavlo Palisa (2023 – 2024)

Insignia
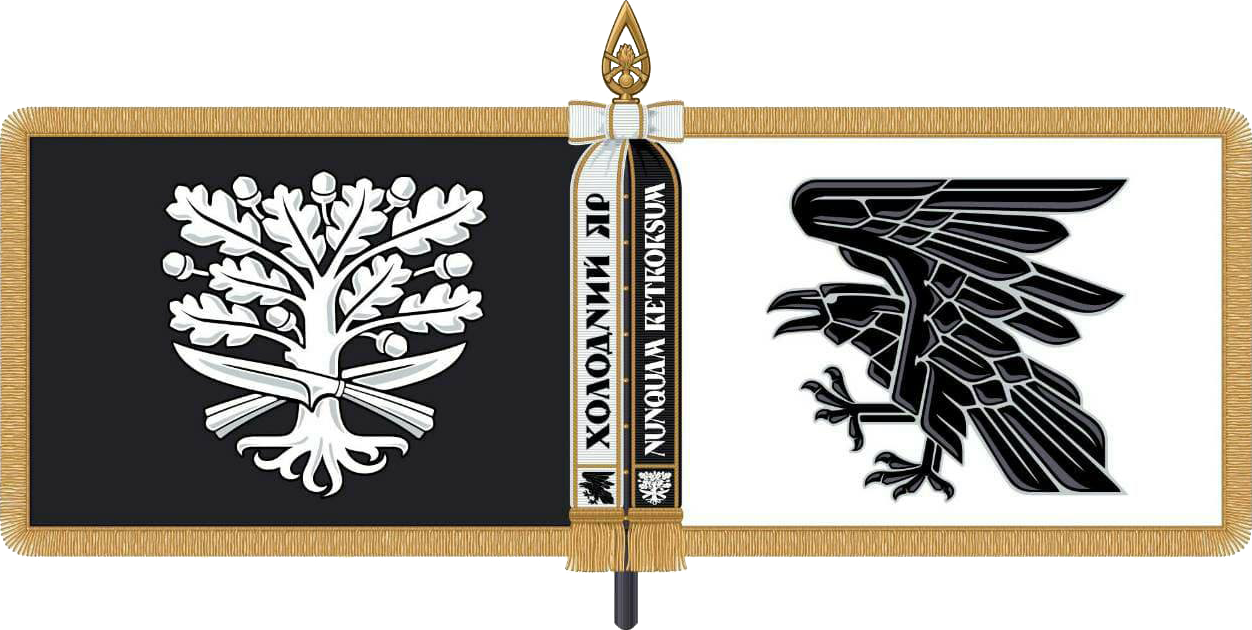
- Garrison color

- Old Insignia 2023

The 93rd Mechanized Brigade "Kholodnyi Yar" (Ukrainian: 93-тя окрема механізована бригада «Холодний Яр», romanized: 93 okrema mekhanizovana bryhada "Kholodnyi Yar") is a formation of the Ukrainian Ground Forces formed in 1992. It has been described as "one of the most brutally effective" of Ukraine’s front-line brigades.

By January 2023, Western analysts claimed that due to captured Russian and donated Western equipment and incorporation of local volunteer battalions into the units structure, the 93rd was the size of an armored division, being a mechanized brigade in name only. The brigade is named after the Kholodnyi Yar Republic, a Ukrainian partisan state during the Ukrainian War of Independence.

== History ==
The brigade traces its history to the 93rd Guards Rifle Division of the Soviet Union's Red Army, formed at Valuyki in April 1943 from 13th Guards and 92nd Rifle Brigades. The division fought at Kursk, Kharkiv, Budapest, and Prague, and was serving with the 53rd Army of the 2nd Ukrainian Front in May 1945. After a period as a 35th Guards Mechanized Division, and then 35th Guards Motor Rifle Division 1957–65, the division was redesignated as the 93rd Guards Motor Rifle Division in 1965. It served with the Southern Group of Forces in Hungary during the last years of the Cold War, and after the fall of the Berlin Wall was withdrawn to Ukraine from October 1990 to January 1991.

There it became part of the Ukrainian Ground Forces. In Decree 925/96(?), Colonel Anatoly Savatiovich Pushnyakov, Commander of the 93rd Mechanised Division of the 6th Army Corps, Southern Operational Command, Ukrainian Ground Forces, was promoted to Major General.

The division appears to have been redesignated a brigade after 1996 and before 1999.

Throughout 1999, the '93rd Motor Rifle Division' conducted a series of small unit and staff officer exchanges with the 40th Infantry Division of the California Army National Guard.

On December 10, 2007, the Brigade received its Regimental Colour by the order of the President of Ukraine.

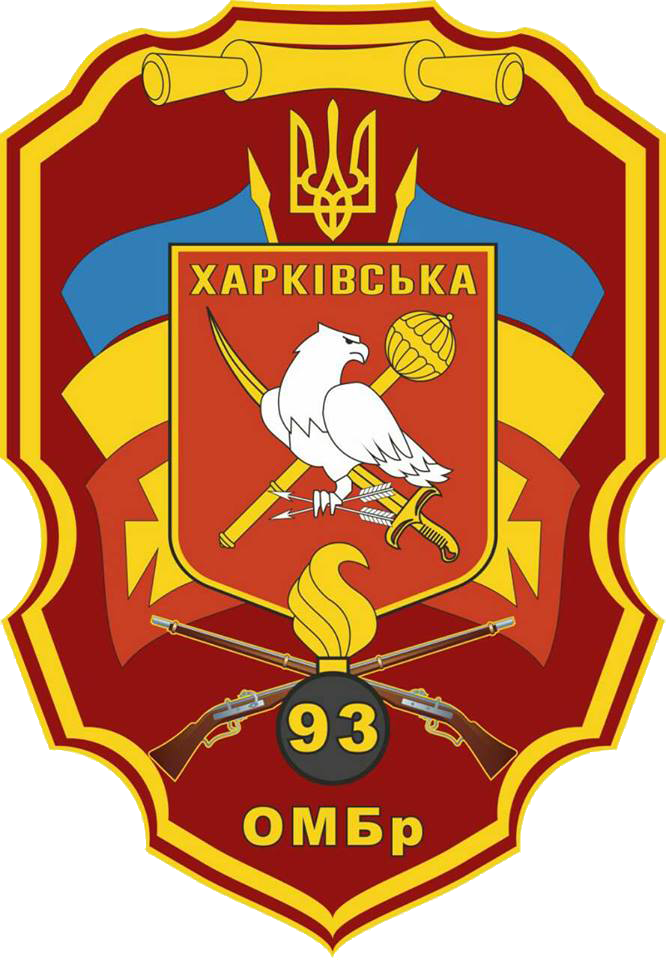
Former patch of the 93rd Mechanized Brigade

The brigade fought in the war in Donbas, defending Donetsk International Airport during the Second Battle of Donetsk Airport alongside other units. Thus, they are one of the units considered as one of the "cyborgs".

The brigade is now based in Pokrovsk. On November 18, 2015, its honorifics "Twice Red Banner Orders of Suvorov and Kutuzov" were removed as part of an Armed Forces-wide removal of Soviet awards and honorifics, but not its Kharkiv battle honor, given as a result of its participation in the 1943 Belgorod-Khar'kov Offensive Operation. On August 22, 2016, its Guards title was also removed.

In honor of the centennial year of the Ukrainian War of Independence the brigade received its second honorific title, Kholodnyi Yar (Kholodnyi Yar was a pro-Ukrainian partisan self-proclaimed state that existed from 1919 to 1922), in 2018, and thus its Kharkiv battle honour was officially removed from the full title of the unit. A new colour was also received by the brigade command which differs from the maroon colour it received in 2007.

== Participation in peacekeeping missions ==
In the recent history of the Armed Forces of Ukraine, the 93rd Division became the first basic unit to train the first units of the peacekeeping forces. The 108th peacekeeping training center was established on the basis of the 112th Motorized Rifle Regiment of the division. Here were formed 15 rotations of the 240th battalion, which performed peacekeeping functions in the former Yugoslavia. On the basis of the 3rd Mechanized Battalion, the 71st Separate Mechanized Battalion was formed to be included in the 7th Separate Mechanized Brigade, which carried out the peacekeeping mission in Iraq in 2004–2005. It was disbanded at the end of training due to the decision to reduce the contingent. A few of its personnel were sent to replenish the 73rd Battalion. Soldiers also served in peacekeeping operations in Sierra Leone, Liberia, and Lebanon.

== Russo-Ukrainian War ==
=== War in Donbas ===
The brigade was deployed in the war in Donbas against the Russian army and its proxy forces.

According to Oleh Mikats, the brigade's commander at the time, the 93rd Brigade lost its first soldiers killed in action during the 23 May 2014 battle at the Zolotyi Kolodiaz checkpoint in the Donetsk region.

The unit fought on the frontlines from 2014 to 2016 before being recalled in March 2016. During this period, 138 soldiers were killed in action, over 1,000 were wounded, and 9 soldiers were held as prisoners of war. The brigade was involved in the battle of Ilovaisk, Avdiivka, the defence of Donetsk airport, the defence of Marinka, and the defence of Pisky. A documentary, 93: Battle for Ukraine, was made by Ukrainian director Lidia Guzhva about the brigade's role in the war, constructed primarily from videos made by members of the brigade themselves, as well as interviews with members of the brigade.

The brigade returned to the frontline. On July 19, 2016, an IFV of the brigade detonated an IED, killing two soldiers.

In June 2017 the brigade moved deeper into the disputed area near the village of Krymske and set up fortifications there "to exert stricter fire control over the enemy, and provides for a better defense."

=== Russian invasion of Ukraine ===
==== Operations in Sumy Oblast (February–March 2022) ====
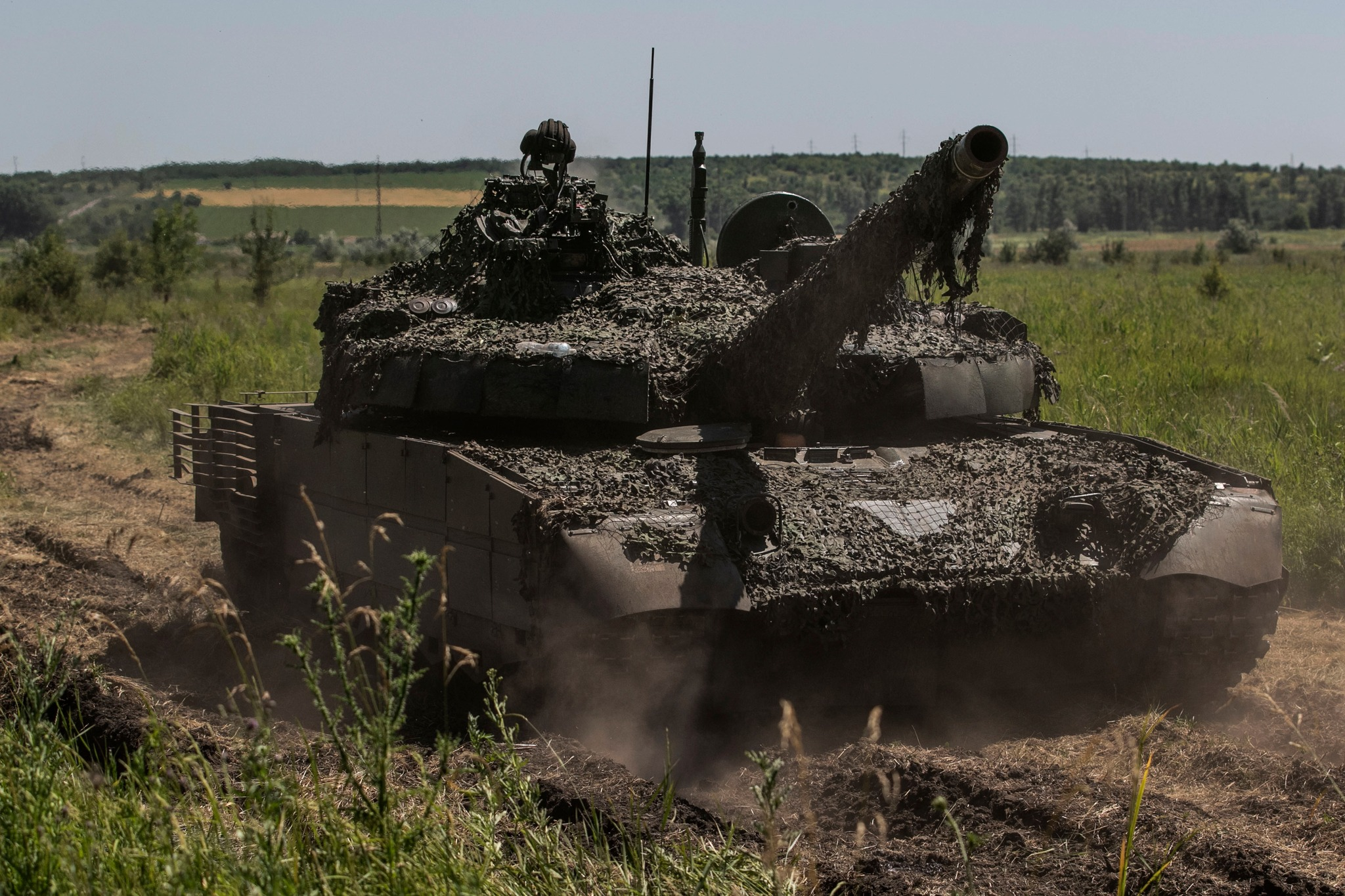
Captured Russian T-80BVM in service with the 93rd Mechanized Brigade

In the early hours of 24 February 2022, the first day of the Russian invasion of Ukraine, the brigade's 1st Battalion was located at Kolomak in the Poltava region. Upon the outbreak of war, one of the battalion's companies immediately moved towards the Russia-Ukraine border, having been ordered to advance to the road between the settlements of Okhtyrka and Velyka Pysarivka in the Sumy region. The unit subsequently held positions on the border between Velyka Pysarivka and Liutivka in the Kharkiv region. No Russian offensives took place on this front but there was skirmishing along the border. The unit remained at this location from 24 February to 5 March, at which point it began to be redeployed to Balakliia in the Kharkiv region.

On 24 February 2022, the first day of the Russian invasion of Ukraine, the brigade captured two members of Russia's 423rd Guards Yampolsky Motor Rifle Regiment. The 93rd Brigade was involved in the defense of Okhtyrka in the Sumy Oblast starting on February 24. During the early days of the invasion, units of the brigade also took part in combat near the city of Bohodukhiv, in the Kharkiv region.

On March 26, the 93rd Brigade retook the city of Trostianets in the Sumy Oblast, after the retreat of the elite Russian 4th Guards Tank Division. After Trostianets, units of the 93rd Brigade went on to retake Boromlia.

==== Operations near Izium (March–August 2022) ====
The brigade's 1st Battalion was redeployed by 5 March to Balakliia as a separate battalion tactical group, excluding one company which was detached and sent to reinforce Barvinkove. The battalion tactical group at Balakliia was headquartered in Piatyhirske. One of its companies held the village Pryshyb, and the other held Shevelivka and Pershotravneve. Fighting against two battalion tactical groups of Russia's 3rd Motor Rifle Division, the Ukrainian units captured the village of Husarivka. A further offensive on Nova Husarivka was planned but the entire battalion was ordered to move to Barvinkove before this could be implemented.

The units of the 3rd Division were later redeployed towards Izium and were replaced by the 7th Motorized Rifle Regiment of the 11th Army Corps.

Later in the war, the 93rd Mechanized Brigade was tasked with the defense of Barvinkove in an area of the Kharkiv region near the border with the Donetsk region, where it was again deployed against units of Russia's 1st Guards Tank Army; it was forced out of the villages of Zavody and Velyka Komyshuvakha by Russian troops.

The 1st Battalion later held an area on the border of the Kharkiv Oblast and the Donetsk Oblast, in defense of Barvinkove, and was forced by the Russians to fall back to the villages of Nova Dmytrivka and Kurulka The battalion's 5th Company repelled Russian attacks on the former village.

In early August 2022, units of the brigade reportedly liberated the village of Mazanivka, southwest of Izium. Journalist David Axe said the 93rd was one of the few Ukrainian formations actively liberating Russian-occupied territory at the time.

After spending five months involved in combat near Izium, the brigade was redeployed to Bakhmut in the Donetsk Oblast on 11 August 2022. A 93rd Brigade officer said that the brigade suffered "very serious" losses on the Izium front.

==== Operations near Bakhmut (August 2022–May 2023) ====
By September 2022, it had been reported that the 93rd Brigade was holding the defense of Bakhmut.

In October 2022, the 93rd Mechanized Brigade was engaged in the battle of Bakhmut holding the northern sector of the besieged city while the 58th Motorized Infantry Brigade held the south counterattacking assaults by Russian Wagner Group mercenaries. The brigade recaptured the M03 and M06 highways east of Bakhmut. Heavy casualties were reported on both sides for units participating in the battle and the 93rd was rotated out of the front and replaced with other units. The brigade reportedly spent nine months fighting near Bakhmut, starting from 11 August 2022.

==== Recent operations (2023–present) ====
In May 2023, during the Ukrainian counter-offensive, the 93rd Mechanized Brigade fought near Donetsk. Three miles south of Donetsk the 93rd joined the efforts to defeat a counterattack by the Russian 60th Separate Motorized Rifle Brigade.

During May 2024, the 93rd Mechanized Brigade fought in the battle of Chasiv Yar.

In July 2024, the 93rd Mechanized Brigade added the Special Rifle Alcatraz Battalion to their forces.

The 93rd Mechanized Brigade has been recognized for innovative tactics and procedures using drones. In August 2024 the Brigade successfully used Wild Hornet FPV drones to down unmanned aerial vehicle reconnaissance drones.

In December 2024 Shamil Krutkov was appointed as the brigade's commander.

== Order of battle ==
=== 1997 ===
- Division Headquarters Battalion
- Guards Company
- 110th Mechanized Regiment
- 529th Mechanized Regiment
- 87th Armoured Regiment
- Command and Artillery Reconnaissance Company
- 198th Self-Propelled Artillery Regiment
- 446th Anti-Tank Artillery Battalion
- 1039th Anti-Aircraft Missile Regiment
- 108th Combat Engineer Battalion
- 166th Signal Battalion
- 1119th Logistics Battalion
- 16th Reconnaissance Battalion
- 35th Electronic Warfare Company
- 73rd Repair and Recovery Battalion
- 89th Medical Battalion
- 133rd Chemical Battalion
- 16th Training Area
- Military Band

=== 2007 ===
- 1st Mechanized Battalion
- 2nd Mechanized Battalion
- 3rd Mechanized Battalion
- Armored Battalion

=== 2024 ===
As of 2024, the brigade's structure is as follows:

- 93rd Mechanized Brigade, Cherkaske
  - Brigade Headquarters and HQ Company
  - 1st Mechanized Battalion
  - 2nd Mechanized Battalion
  - 3rd Mechanized Battalion
  - 1st Motorized Infantry Battalion "Night Watch"
  - 20th Separate Motorized Battalion "Dnipro"
  - 1st Rifle Battalion
  - 2nd Rifle Battalion
  - Special Rifle Battalion “Alcatraz” (Shkval Battalion)
  - Attack Drone Battalion "Black Raven"
  - "Signum" Battalion
  - Tank Battalion
  - Field Artillery Regiment
    - Headquarters & Target Acquisition Battery (A1-CM Furia)
    - 1st Self-propelled Artillery Battalion (2S1 Gvozdika)
    - 2nd Self-propelled Artillery Battalion (M109A6)
    - Rocket Artillery Battalion (BM-21 Grad)
    - Anti-tank Artillery Battalion (Stugna-P, FGM-148 Javelin)
  - Anti-Aircraft Defense Missile Artillery Battalion (9K35 Strela-10, FIM-92 Stinger, ZU-23-2)
  - Reconnaissance Company
  - UAV Unit "Seneca"
  - Combat Engineer Battalion
  - Logistic Battalion
  - Maintenance Battalion
  - Signal Company
  - Radar Company
  - Chemical, Biological, Radiological and Nuclear Defense Company
  - Medical Company
  - Military Band

== Awards ==
- 1943 received the Guards designation.
- 1943 received the Order of the Red Banner, and again in 1944.
- 1943 received the honorable name «Kharkovskaya» (later Ukrainianized as «Kharkivska»)
- 1943 received the Order of Suvorov, Second Class.
- 1945 received the Order of Kutuzov, Second Class.
- On December 10, 2007, received its Colour
- 2018 received "Kholodnyi Yar" honorific

== Traditions ==
=== Anniversaries ===
Until August 22, 2018, the brigade celebrated its anniversary on May 10, considered the day of creation of the brigade.

Since 2018, August 22 is considered the anniversary, the day when the brigade was awarded the honorary name "Kholodny Yar" by Presidential Decree No. 232/2018 and a new colour was presented.

=== Symbolics ===
On January 22, 2018, Roman Donik announced his intention to give the brigade the honorary name "Kholodny Yar", in honor of the historical area with a long military history.

Also, as part of updating the brigade symbols, the anthem of the military unit was changed. The words for the new song were written by a soldier of the press service of the 93rd OMBr, junior sergeant Vlad "Zmiy" Sord, and Serhii Vasylyuk, the frontman of the Ukrainian band "Shadow of the Sun", who wrote the music and set Stafiychuk's poem to it.

On May 10, 2018, the brigade was presented with and consecrated an honorary banner to the new honorary name "Kholodny Yar". This is only the second time in the history of the Armed Forces of Ukraine, after the 24th mechanized brigade, when a brigade received an honorary (motivational) flag in addition to the official battle flag.

In July 2018, it was announced that knives with the brigade's insignia would be developed for distinguished soldiers.

By Decree of the President of Ukraine dated August 22, 2018, No. 232/2018, the brigade was given the honorary name "Kholodny Yar". Before that, the brigade had the honorary name "Kharkivska".

On August 24, 2018, before the start of the military parade in honor of the 27th anniversary of the Independence of Ukraine, the commander of the 93rd Mechanized Brigade "Kholodny Yar", Colonel Vladyslav Klochkov, received a new battle flag from the President of Ukraine, Petro Poroshenko.

On February 23, 2019, the Chief of the General Staff of the Armed Forces of Ukraine, Viktor Muzhenko, approved the new emblem of the brigade.

On May 6, 2022, the brigade was awarded the honorary award "For Honor and Courage".

== See also ==
- Yana Rykhlitska
