= 157th Mechanized Brigade =

Ukrainian Ground Forces unit

- 157-ма окрема механізована бригада
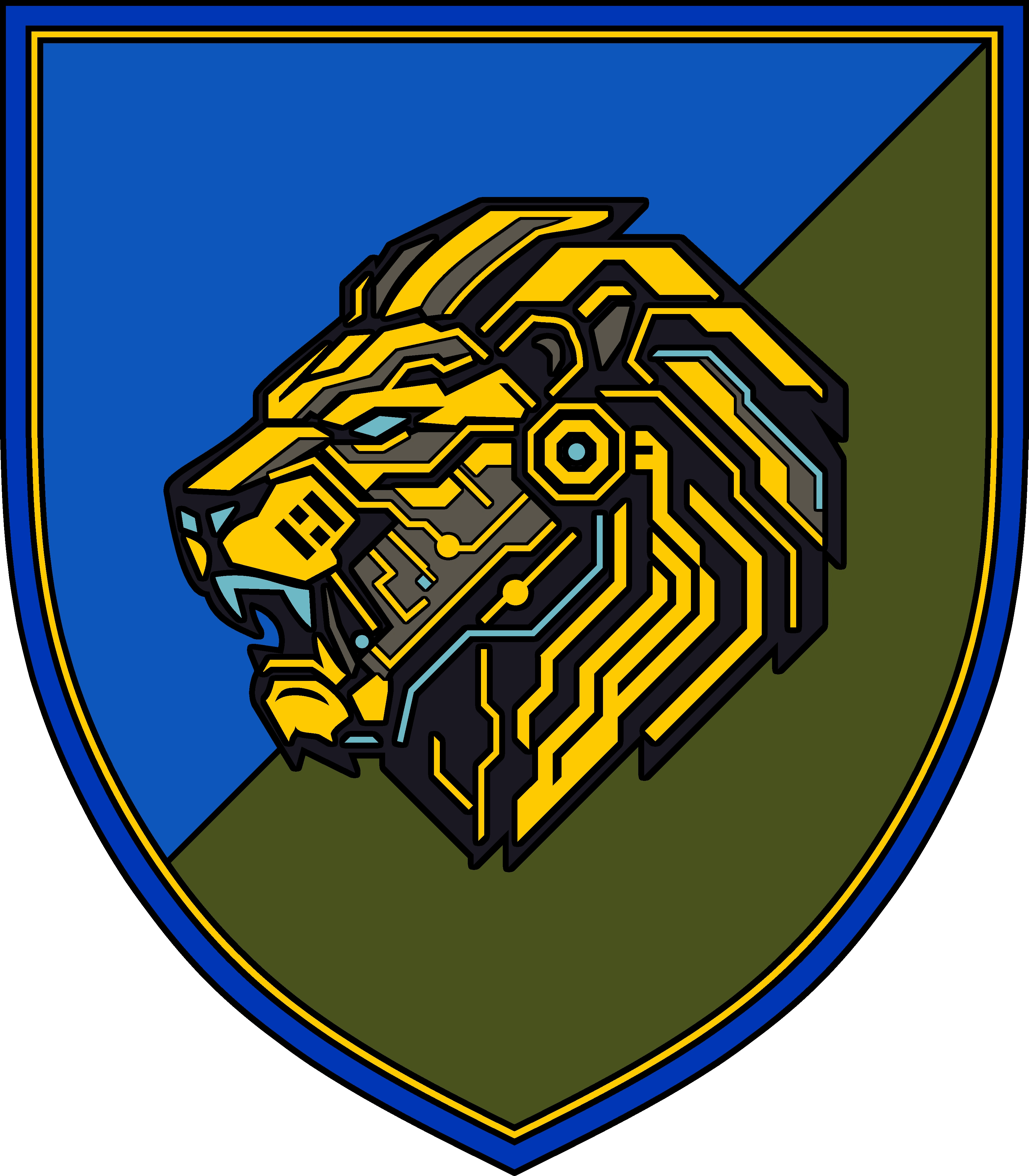
- Shoulder sleeve insignia
- Active: 2024–present
- Country: Ukraine
- Branch: Ukrainian Ground Forces
- Type: Mechanized Infantry
- Size: Brigade
- Engagements: Russo-Ukrainian war; Pokrovsk offensive

Commanders
- Current commander: Col. Petro Chub

Insignia
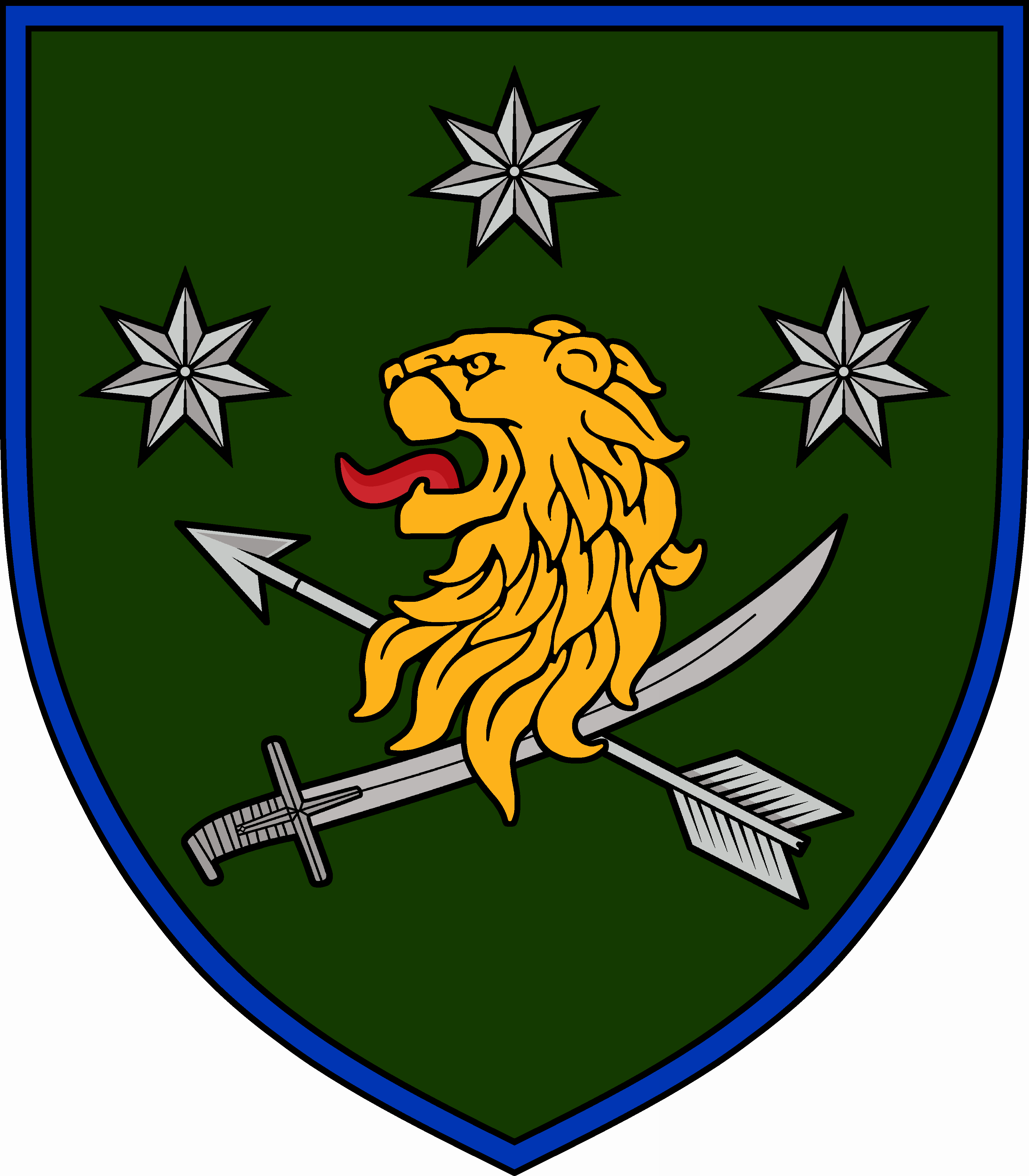
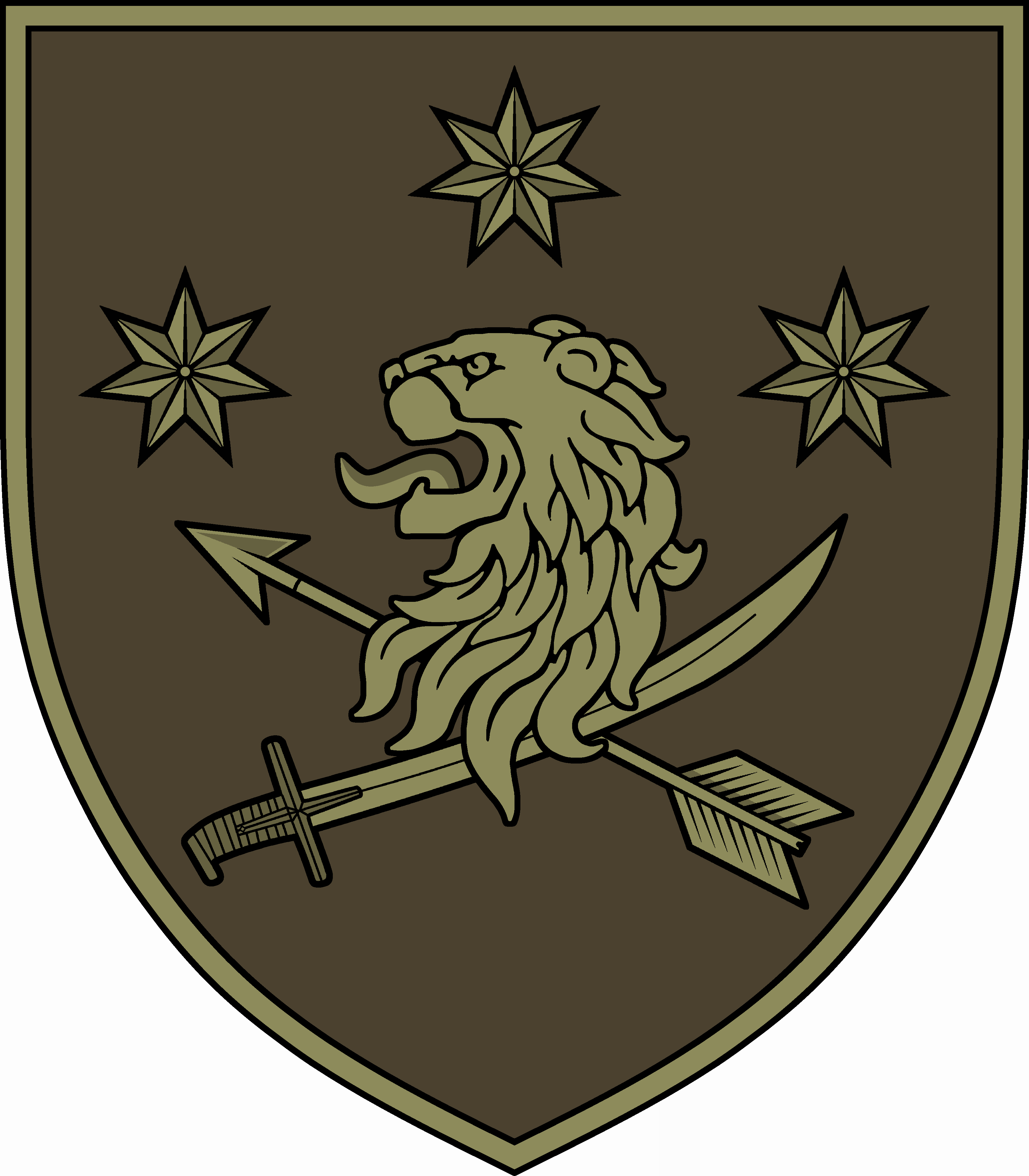
- Former sleeve insignia

Mobile drone team of the Brigade

The 157th Separate Mechanized Brigade (Note: Ukrainian: 157-ма окрема механізована бригада) is a formation of the Ukrainian Ground Forces formed in 2024.

== History ==
=== Formation ===
The brigade was formed after a Ukrainian mobilization law came into force, seeing the draft age being lowered from 27 to 25 and placing penalties for those avoiding conscription. This law also saw prisoners being able to join the armed forces.

The brigade was deployed to defend Pokrovsk during the Russian offensive in the area, but suffered from poor training and low morale and was reportedly deteriorating while being transferred to Pokrovsk due to high desertion rates, which had led to the collapse of another 150-series brigade a few weeks prior.

== Structure ==
As of July 2024, the brigade's structure is as follows:

- 157th Infantry Brigade
  - Brigade's Headquarters
  - 1st Infantry Battalion
  - 2nd Infantry Battalion
  - 3rd Infantry Battalion
  - 4th Infantry Battalion
  - 5th Infantry Battalion
  - Reconnaissance Company
  - Anti-Tank Company
  - Anti-Aircraft Defense Company
  - Engineer Company
  - Maintenance Company
  - Medical Company

== See also ==
- 155th Infantry Brigade – a newly created infantry unit in the Ukrainian Ground Forces in May 2024, part of the new expansion
