= Yana Rykhlitska =

Ukrainian volunteer, soldier, combat medic

- Яна Рихліцька

Personal details
- Born: Yana Mykolaivna Rykhlitska; 2 April 1993 Vinnytsia
- Died: 3 March 2023 (aged 29) near the city of Bakhmut, Donetsk Oblast
- Education: Yaroslav Mudryi National Law University
- Nickname: Yara (Яра)

Military service
- Allegiance: Ukraine
- Branch/service: Armed Forces of Ukraine
- Rank: Soldier
- Battles/wars: Russo-Ukrainian War
- Awards: Order of Bohdan Khmelnytsky

Yana Mykolaivna Rykhlitska (Ukrainian: Яна Миколаївна Рихліцька, call sign "Yara"; 2 April 1993, Vinnytsia — 3 March 2023, near the city of Bakhmut, Donetsk Oblast) was a Ukrainian volunteer, soldier, combat medic of the 93rd Mechanized Brigade of the Armed Forces of Ukraine, and a participant of the Russian-Ukrainian war.

== Biography ==
Yana Rykhlitska was born on 2 April 1993 in Vinnytsia.

She graduated from the Faculty of Economics and Law of the Yaroslav Mudryi National Law University (2015). During her student years, she was actively involved in sports and was a candidate for master of sports in sambo and judo. Rykhlitska also worked in the IT industry.

In wake of the large-scale Russian invasion of Ukraine, she began active volunteer work. In May 2022, she became a combat medic of the 93rd Separate Mechanized Brigade "Kholodnyi Yar", saving many lives in the stabilization center in Bakhmut.

Days after being photographed in action, she was killed by Russian artillery fire on 3 March 2023, during the evacuation of the wounded near the city of Bakhmut, Donetsk Oblast.

She was buried on the Alley of Heroes in her hometown and was survived by her parents and her significant other.

== Awards ==
- Order of Bohdan Khmelnytsky, 3rd class (7 April 2023, posthumously)
