= Shkval Battalion =

Ukrainian penal military unit

Specialized Rifle Battalion "Shkval"
- Батальйон Шквал
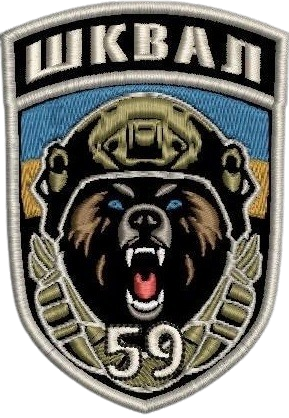
- Active: 2024 – Present
- Allegiance: Ukraine
- Type: Penal military unit
- Role: Assault troops
- Size: Unknown
- Nickname: Wind Gust Battalion
- Engagements: Russian Invasion of Ukraine: Pokrovsk offensive

Commanders
- Current commander: "Oleksandr" (47th separate mechanized brigade)

The Specialized Rifle Battalion "Shkval", or simply the Shkval Battalion is a Ukrainian military unit made up of former convicts. It was formed after the Verkhovna Rada passed Registered draft law No. 11079 which allowed for the mobilization of convicts into the Ukrainian Army.

== History ==
=== Formation ===
Members of the battalion are offered wages ranging from $500 to $4,000 per month, depending on time spent on the front line. However, they are required to serve in the military until the end of the war. Members of the battalion were then trained by other Ukrainian units. In September 2024, the 59th Brigade's Shkval battalion told reporters that they are making legal requests in order to allow more murderers of various degrees to join their ranks.

=== Treatment and use ===
Protection for Prisoners of Ukraine leader Oleg Tsvily said that his organization "supports the idea behind the law but the text that was passed is discriminatory". He also raised concerns about convicts being abused by their commanders and used as cannon fodder. Some convicts said that they had only had 20 days of training before being sent to the frontline.

=== Combat performance ===
The Shkval battalion saw action during the Pokrovsk offensive. Ukrainian media outlets reported that Shkval Battalions fight bravely and made claims that they "destroy Russian forces in large numbers." One officer with the callsign "Kit" spoke with UNN about the 47th Mechanized Brigade's Shkval Battalion where he praised their motivation but said that there were "issues with their upbringing". The unit took part in the defense of the village Druzhba. Yevgeny Alkhimov, an officer of the 28th Mechanized Brigade, praised the soldiers of the brigade's Shkval battalion after an assault on Russia positions northeast of the city of Toretsk saying that the soldiers "showed themselves very well at the tactical level in order to level the positions, to somehow improve our situation. Actually, they stormed enemy positions and repulsed them".

=== Women ===
Since the May 2024 law was passed allowing the mobilisation of convicted individuals, a very strict selection of female prisoners has, after thorough screening, also been given the opportunity of redeeming themselves by fighting in defence of the country. In June 2026, University of Notre Dame professor Michael C. Desch of International Relations pointed out that the available pool of women in Ukrainian prisons was only about 1,500, of which just over 200 made it through the screening to become soldiers since May 2024, meaning that in quantitative terms, this women prisoner redemption option did not contribute much to address Ukraine's personnel shortage, dubbing it mostly a "feel-good story". On the other hand, the female prisoners-turned-soldiers themselves, often serving in the drone forces, have shown high levels of motivation and gratitude for the second chance society has given them, and Brigade Commander Mykola from the Shkval Battalion praised their determinacy and qualitative combat performance.

== Units with Shkval Battalions ==
- 28th Mechanized Brigade
- 35th Marine Brigade
- 47th Mechanized Brigade (Nicknamed Squall Battalion)
- 57th Motorized Brigade
- 93rd Mechanized Brigade (Nicknamed Alkatraz. Also known as the Specialized Rifle Battalion)
- 129th Territorial Defense Brigade

== See also ==
- Ukrainian penal military units during the Russian invasion of Ukraine
- Kharakternyky Battalion
