= 21st Mechanized Brigade =

Ukrainian Ground Forces unit

- 21-ша окрема механізована бригада
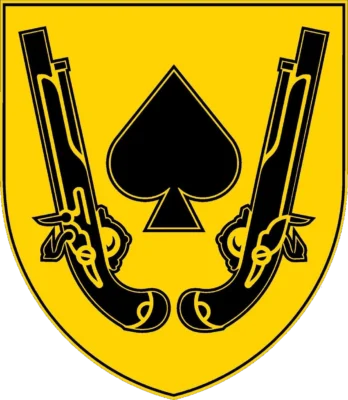
- Active: 28 February 2023
- Country: Ukraine
- Branch: Ukrainian Ground Forces
- Type: Brigade
- Role: Mechanized Infantry
- Part of: Operational Command West: 18th Army Corps
- Garrison/HQ: Podilsk, Odesa Oblast
- Motto: Always Free
- Engagements: Russo-Ukrainian War: Full scale invasion 2022; 2023 Ukrainian counteroffensive; Battle of Bakhmut; Kursk campaign; Kharkiv front
- Decorations: For Courage and Bravery
- Website: Official Facebook page

Commanders
- Current commander: Colonel Yaroslav Tarasenko

Insignia
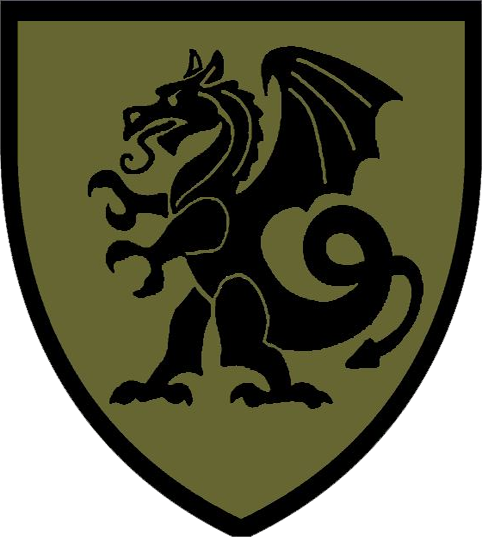
- Old insignia

The 21st Separate Mechanized Brigade (MUN A4689) is a formation of the Ukrainian Ground Forces.

== History ==
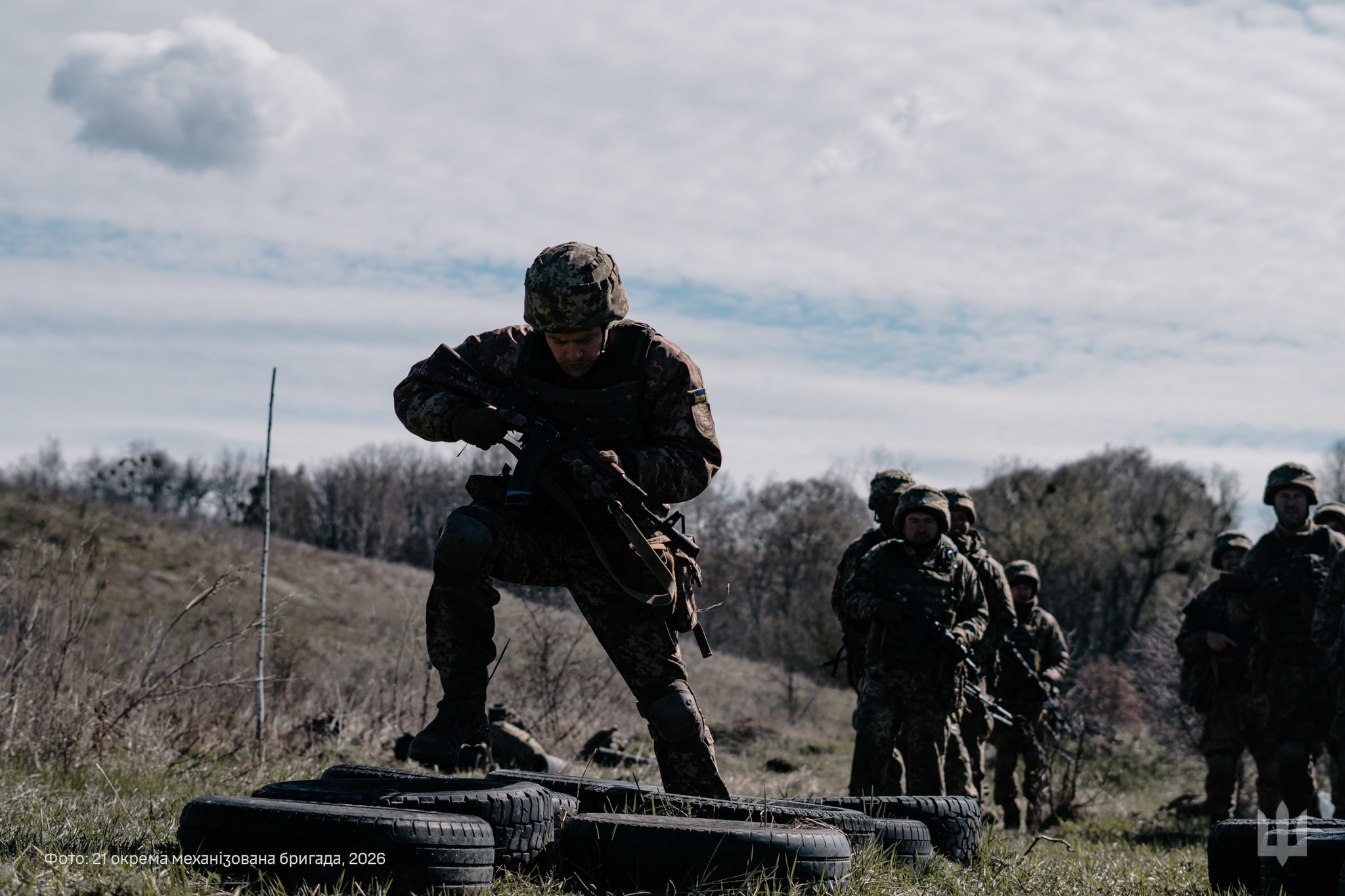
Infantry of the brigade training

On 11 June 2023, during the 2023 Ukrainian offensive, it was reported that elements of the Brigade had taken part in an assault near Orikhiv in the Zaporizhzhia region involving German-made Leopard 2 tanks.

On 6 December 2024, armed forces day, the battle flag was presented to the unit by the President of Ukraine Volodymyr Zelenskyy.

The unit took part in combat in the eastern Bakhmut and north-eastern Kupyansk sectors. Later it thought at the Kharkiv front. The brigade was also one of the elements that operated in Russian territory during the Kursk campaign.

On 23 August 2025 the unit was awarded the honorary award For Courage and Bravery by the President.

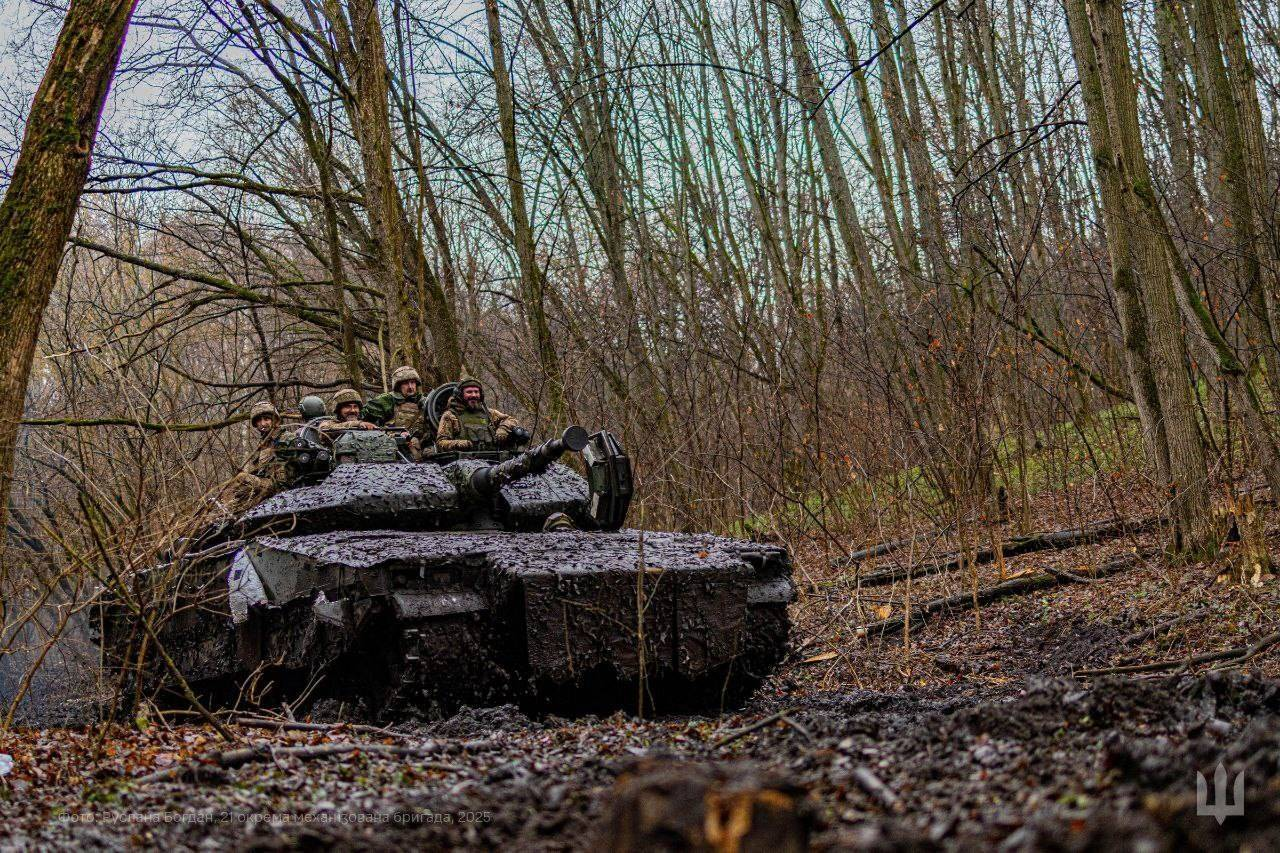
CV-90 in service with the Brigade

== Structure ==
21st Mechanized Brigade

- Headquarters
  - 34th Rifle Battalion
  - 38th Rifle Battalion
  - 408th Rifle Battalion
  - 411th Rifle Battalion
  - 1st Mechanized Battalion
  - 2nd Mechanized Battalion
  - 3rd Mechanized Battalion
  - Tank Battalion
  - Falcon Battalion (UAV)
  - Artillery Group
    - Artillery Group Headquarters
    - 1st Artillery Battalion
    - 2nd Artillery Battalion
    - Rocket Artillery Battalion
    - Anti-Tank Battalion
  - Anti-Aircraft Defense Battalion
  - Engineer Battalion
  - Logistic Battalion
  - Reconnaissance Company
  - Maintenance Company
  - Signal Company
  - Radar Company
  - Medical Company
  - CBRN Company
  - Shkval Company

== Equipment ==
The Brigade is equipped with western donated tanks and IFVs.

Type	Image	Origin	Number	Note
Armored Fighting Vehicles
CV-90		Sweden	?	Donated by Sweden
Rosomak		Poland	?	Donated by Poland
Tanks
Stridsvagn 122		Sweden	?	Donated by Sweden
Leopard 2A6		Germany	?	Donated by Germany and Portugal

== Commanders ==
- Colonel Pavel Iltsiv (As of 08.2024)
- Colonel Andriy Kapkovsky (—26 June 2025)
- Colonel Octavian Botnar (June 2025—)
