= 159th Mechanized Brigade =

Ukrainian Ground Forces unit

- 159 окрема механізована бригада 159 okrema mekhanizovana bryhada
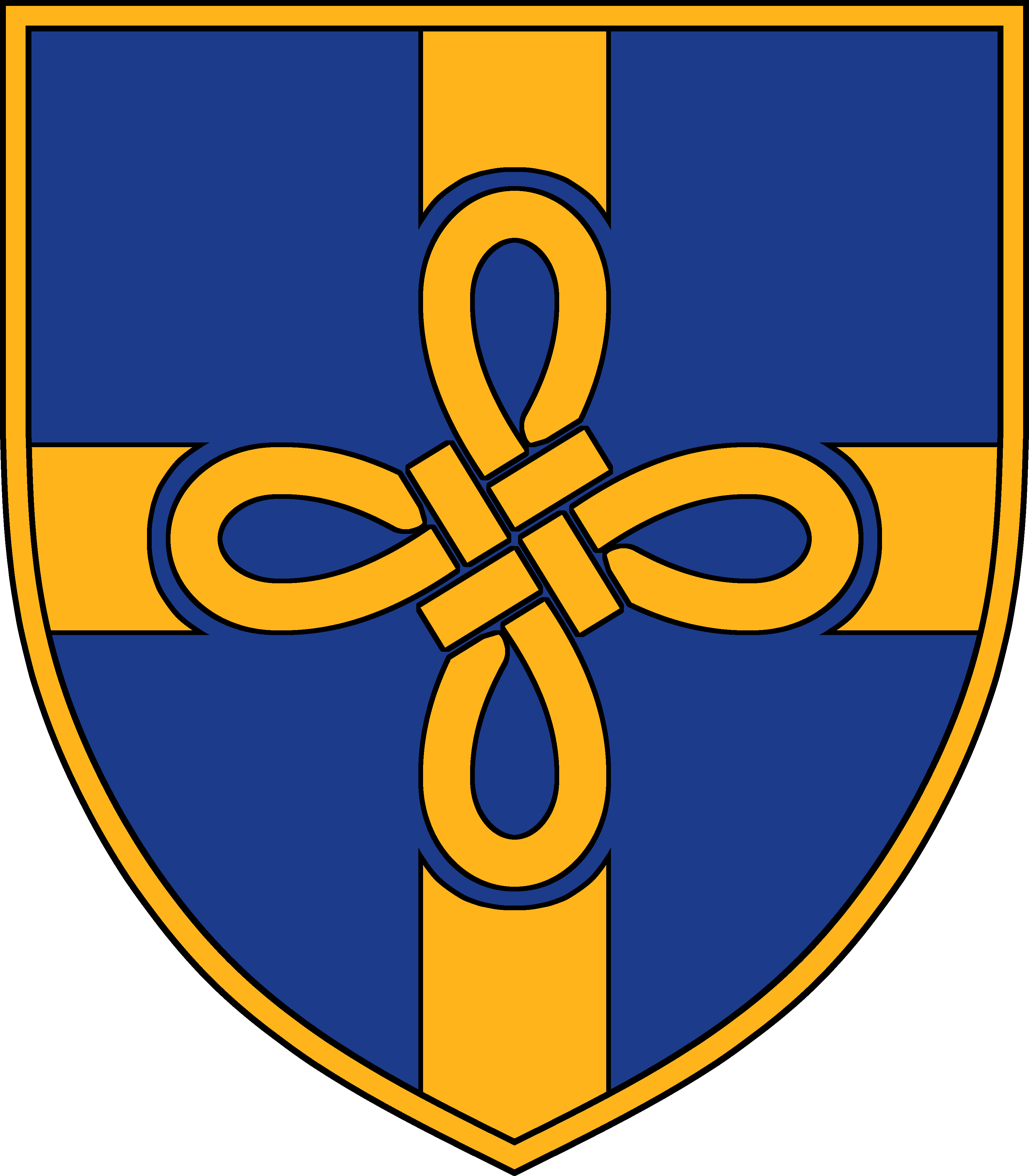
- Shoulder sleeve insignia
- Active: March 12, 2024 – present
- Country: Ukraine
- Branch: Ukrainian Ground Forces
- Type: Mechanized Infantry
- Size: Brigade
- Part of: Operational Command South
- Garrison/HQ: Mykolaiv Oblast
- Engagements: Russo-Ukrainian war; Russian invasion of Ukraine

Commanders
- Current commander: Unknown

Insignia
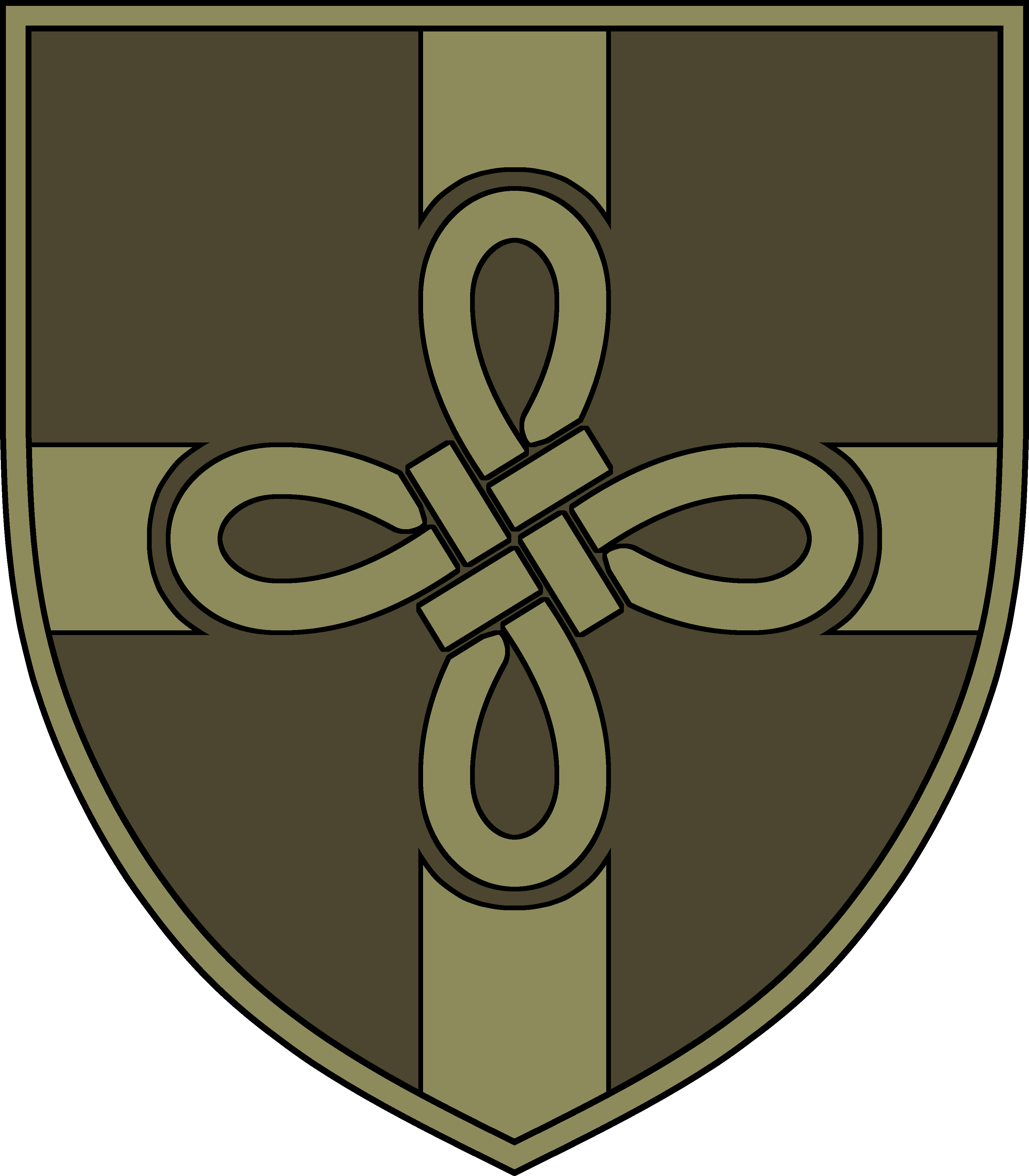
- Subdued insignia

The 159th Mechanized Brigade (Ukrainian: 159 окрема механізована бригада, romanized: 159 okrema mekhanizovana bryhada), is a formation of the Ukrainian Ground Forces formed in April 2024. It was part of the creation and expansion of 10 other brigades in the Ukrainian Ground Forces, announced by its commander Oleksandr Pavliuk, in response to the Russian invasion of Ukraine.

Between April and May 2024 to September 2024, the unit was reformed as a mechanized brigade in line with many other units of the Ukrainian Ground Forces.

== History ==
=== Formation ===
The brigade was formed after a Ukrainian mobilization law came into force, seeing the draft age being lowered from 27 to 25 and placing penalties for those avoiding conscription. This law also saw prisoners being able to join the armed forces.

It was reported by Forbes that these 10 new brigades would consist of 2,000 people and that some of these new brigades would be infantry, not mechanized brigades. It was stated by Pavluvik, the commander of the Ukrainian Ground Forces, that these new brigades could be stationed around Kyiv, Kyiv Oblast, for a potential Russian offensive.

The creation of the brigade was first noted by Pervomaisk City Council by its mayor in a report for April 2024. The report stated that the City Council and the Mayor had assisted in the creation of the 159th Infantry Brigade, according to the report: arranging residences, building materials, and providing technical equipment. The brigade received its insignia on 21 May 2024.

=== Reforms ===
The 159th Infantry Brigade (Ukrainian: 159 окрема піхотна бригада, romanized: 159 okrema pihotna bryhada) became a mechanized brigade at some point between April and September 2024, the latest being known as the 26 September 2024, most likely due to increased and large aid from Western countries such as the United States. After this, the unit became officially known as the 159th Mechanized Brigade (Ukrainian: 159 окрема механізована бригада, romanized: 159 okrema mekhanizovana bryhada).

The discovery of the brigade becoming a mechanized one had come alongside the reformation of other brigades in the same series, such as the 153rd Mechanized Brigade and the 155th Mechanized Brigade. The confirmation of the reform had been revealed through social media publications by ex-Ukrainian President Petro Poroshenko, displaying a flag of the reformed 159th Mechanized Brigade. At some point in time the unit's insignia had also changed, being part of the reform.

=== Insignia ===
The insignia of the brigade was first revealed on social media publications, also revealing the creation of the brigade. The center of the insignia featured a blue shield with a green border, displaying a golden knot in the center. At some point between April and September 2024, the brigade had changed its insignia to feature a golden cross surrounding the knot in the center of the shield; keeping the original blue shield and changing the border to be a golden colour as well.

==== Visual insignia ====
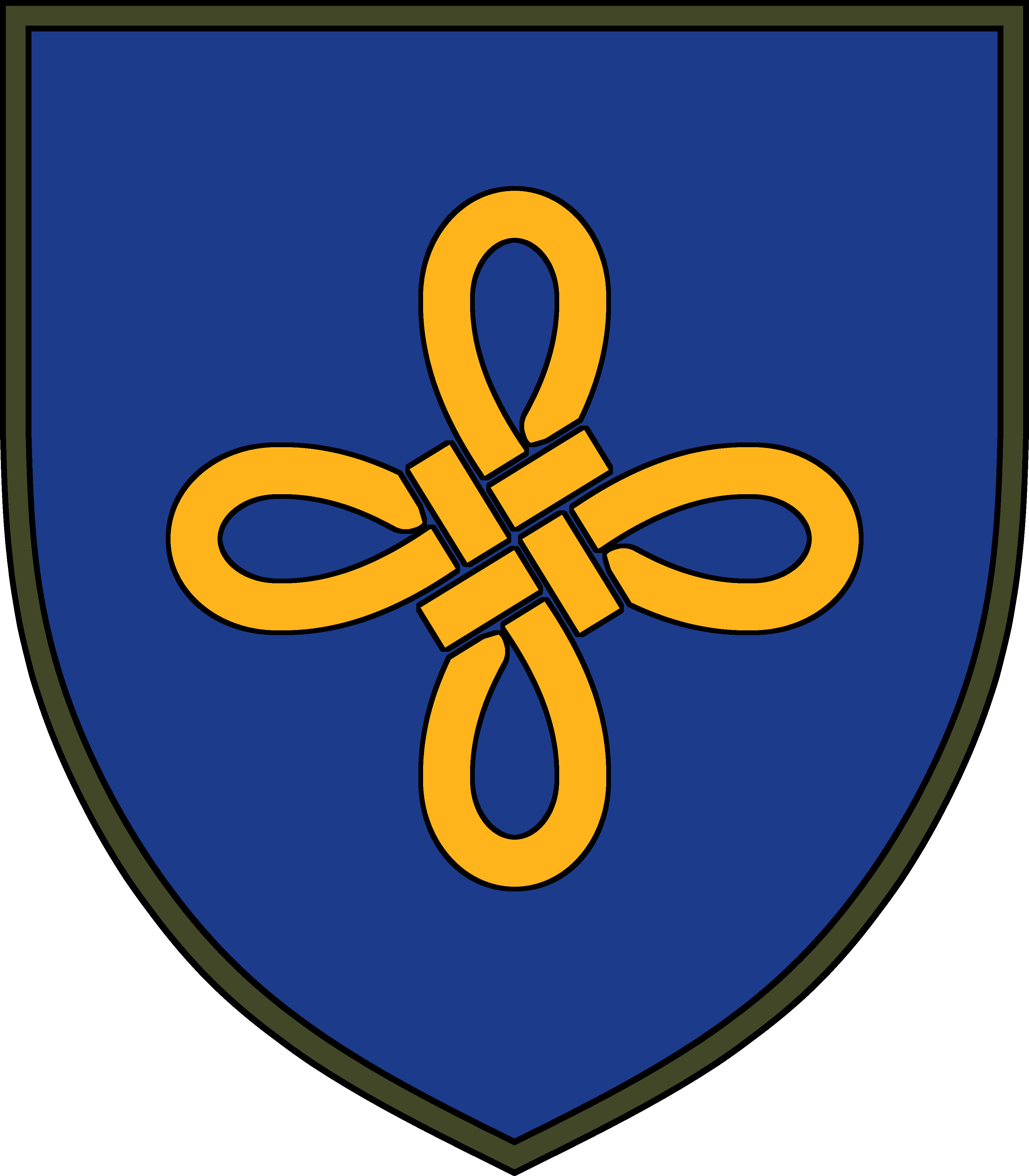
Former shoulder sleeve insignia of the 159th Infantry Brigade.

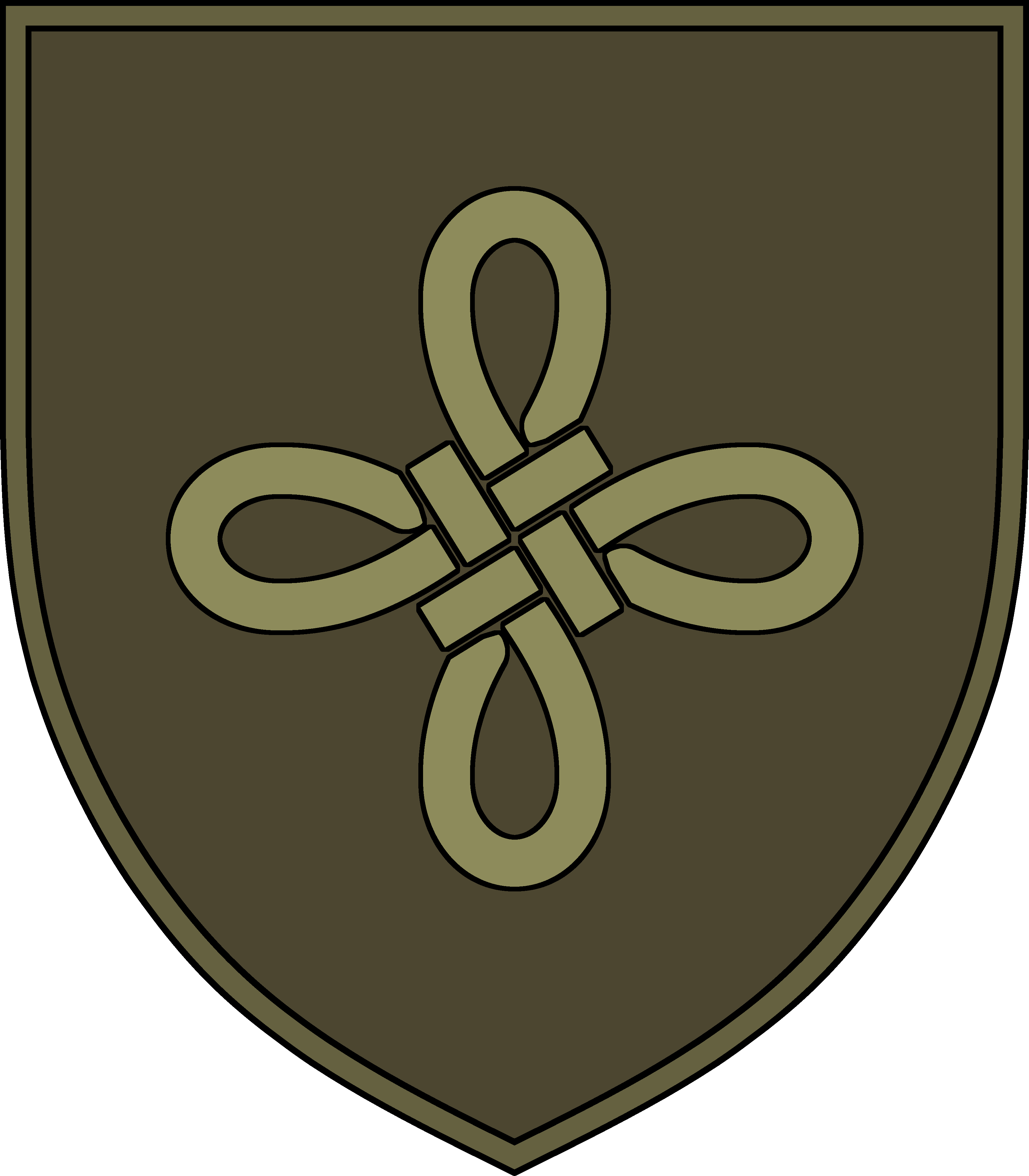
Former shoulder sleeve insignia, subdued variant, of the 159th Infantry Brigade.

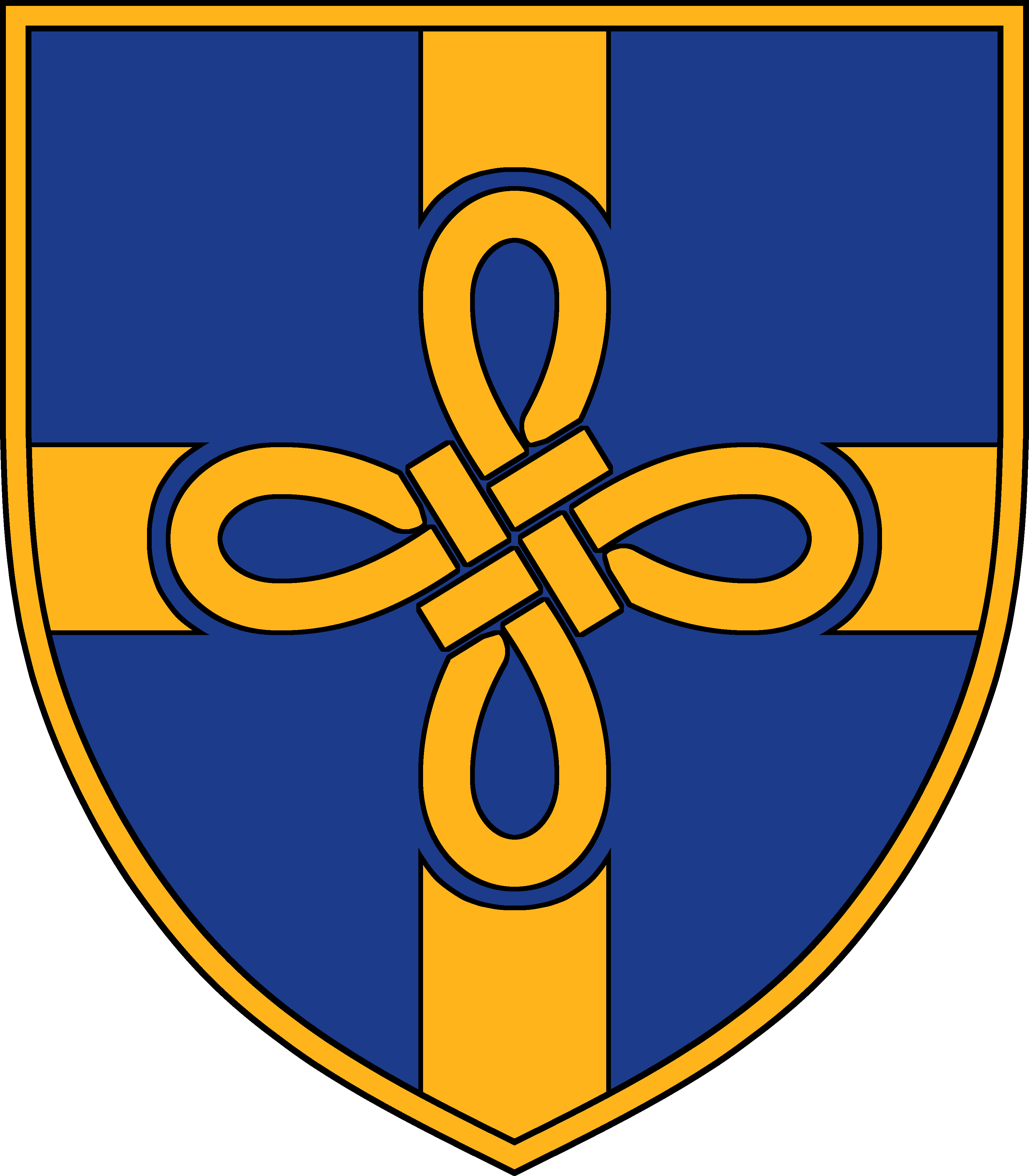
Current shoulder sleeve insignia of the 159th Mechanized Brigade.

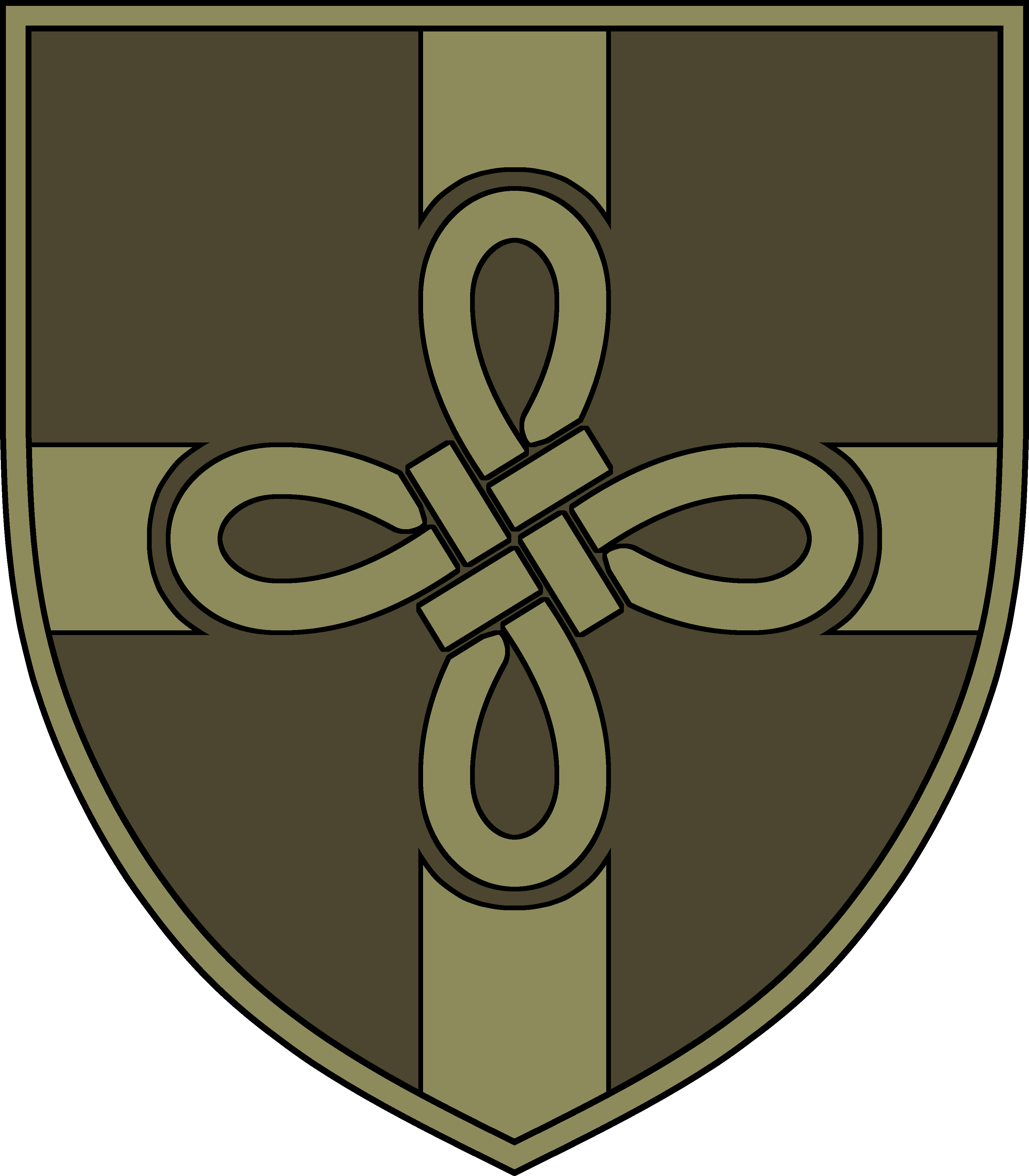
Current shoulder sleeve insignia, subdued variant, of the 159th Mechanized Brigade.

== Russo-Ukrainian war ==
=== Russian invasion of Ukraine ===
The brigade is expected to play a significant role since its formation, most probably expected to repel a potential Russian offensive in 2024. The brigade has been undergoing formation since April or May 2024, currently seeing no combat action.

== Structure ==
As of 26 September 2024, the brigade's structure is as follows:

- 159th Mechanized Brigade
  - Brigade's Headquarters
  - 1st Mechanized Battalion
  - 2nd Mechanized Battalion
  - 3rd Mechanized Battalion
  - 1st Rifle Battalion
  - 2nd Rifle Battalion
  - Tank Battalion
  - Reconnaissance Company
  - Artillery Group
  - Anti-Aircraft Defense Battalion
  - Engineer Battalion
  - Logistic Battalion
  - Signal Company
  - Maintenance Battalion
  - Radar Company
  - Medical Company
  - Chemical, biological, radiological and nuclear defence Protection Company

== See also ==
- 150th Mechanized Brigade – a newly created unit in the Ukrainian Ground Forces in October 2023, part of the previous expansion
