= 143rd Mechanized Brigade =

143rd Separate Mechanized Brigade
- 143-тя окрема механізована бригада
- Insignia of the brigade
- Active: 15 February 2023 – present
- Country: Ukraine
- Branch: Ukrainian Ground Forces
- Role: Mechanized Infantry
- Size: 1,500 - 10,000 servicemen
- Part of: Operational Command North
- Garrison/HQ: Ladynka; MUN A4844
- Engagements: Russo-Ukrainian War; Russian invasion of Ukraine; Svatove-Kreminna line; Northern Kharkiv front
- Website: https://www.facebook.com/profile.php?id=61555672107495

Commanders
- Current commander: Volodymyr Lavryk

Insignia
- Subdued patch

The 143rd Separate Mechanized Brigade (Ukrainian: 143-тя окрема механізована бригада) is a unit of the 15th Army Corps as part of the Ground Forces of Ukraine based in Ladynka. Originally the unit was a reserve rifle brigade, it was reformed into an infantry brigade later in 2023 and into a mechanized brigade in December 2024.

== History ==
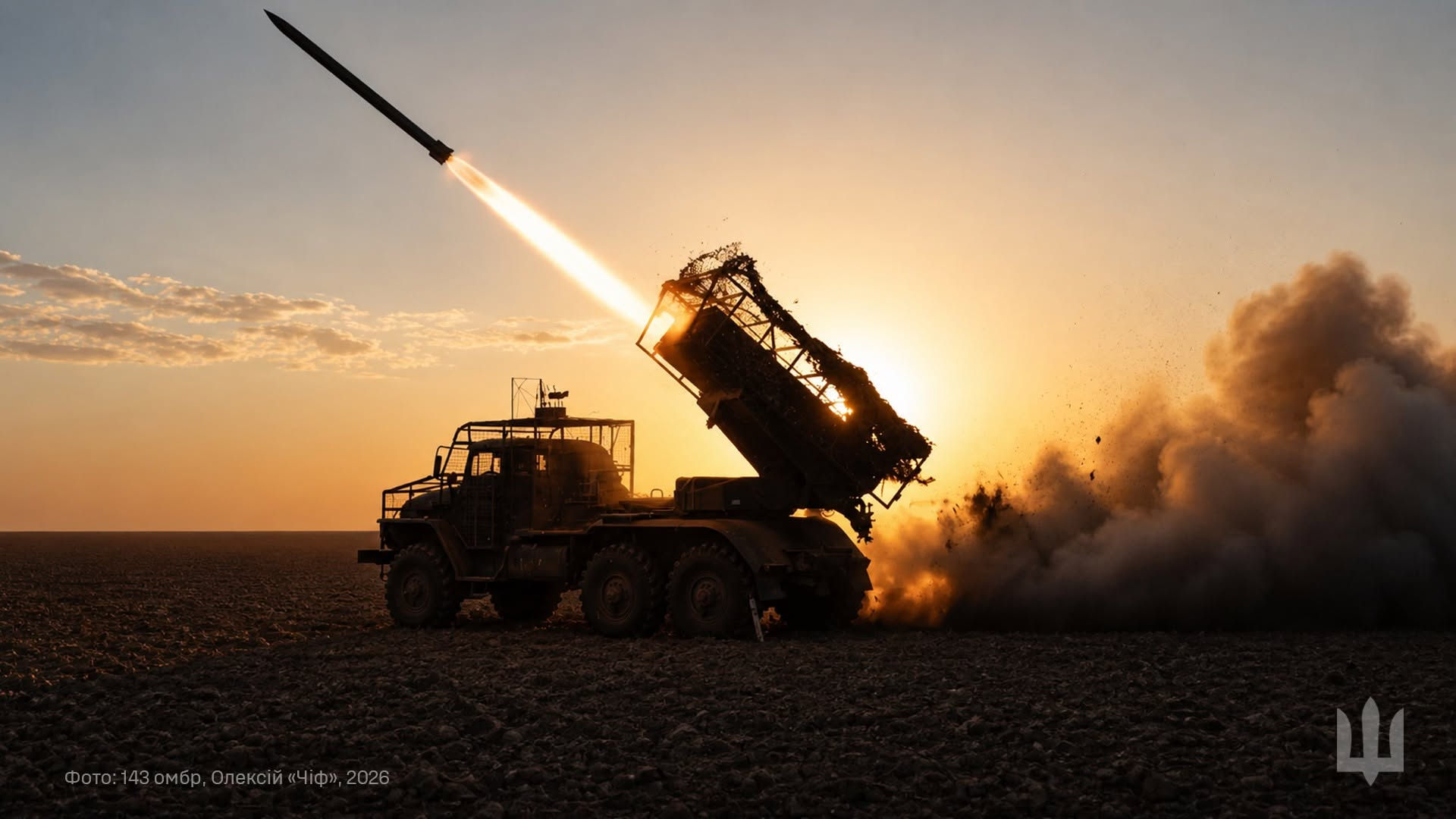
BM-21 of the Brigade

The 143rd Mechanized Brigade was formed on 15 February 2023, as part of an expansion of the Ukrainian Army reserve, bringing together rifle battalions recruited from various Ukrainian regions subordinate to Operational Command North.

The brigade first saw combat in March 2024, when it was deployed to the village of Terny in the Lyman sector in front of the Svatove-Kreminna line. In August 2024, it was transferred to Kharkiv Oblast to defend the town of Vovchansk.

In March 2024, the brigade's 468th battalion was active in the Chasiv Yar sector. In April 2024, the battalion fought in outskirts of the village of Kalynivka, Bakhmut Raion, Donetsk Oblast.

== Structure ==
As of 2024 the brigade's structure is as follows:

- 143rd Mechanized Brigade
  - Brigade HHC
  - 1st Assault Battalion
  - 401st Infantry Battalion (A4802)
  - 402nd Infantry Battalion (A4823)
  - 403rd Infantry Battalion
  - 404th Infantry Battalion
  - 406th Infantry Battalion
  - 412th Infantry Battalion
  - 463th Infantry Battalion (A4969)
  - 464th Infantry Battalion (A4971)
  - 466th Infantry Battalion (A4976)
  - Reconnaissance Company
  - Combat Engineer Company
