= Alcatraz Battalion =

Ukrainian military unit

Special Rifle "Alcatraz" Battalion
- Батальйон Алькатрас 93 бригади
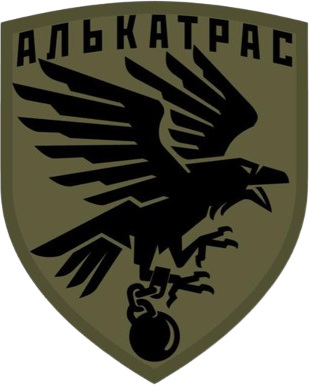
- Battalion insignia
- Active: July 2024 – present
- Country: Ukraine
- Branch: Ukrainian Ground Forces
- Type: Shkval Battalion (Penal military unit)
- Size: 250
- Part of: 93rd Mechanized Brigade
- Garrison/HQ: Cherkaske, Dnipropetrovsk Oblast
- Nickname: 'Alcatraz' (Official)
- Engagements: Russian Invasion of Ukraine

Commanders
- Current commander: Commander "Validol"

The Special Rifles Alcatraz Battalion is a penal battalion (part of the Shkval Battalions) currently operating as part of the 93rd Mechanized Brigade "Kholodnyi Yar" on the eastern front of the Russo-Ukrainian war. Fighting in the Pokrovsk, Kurakhove and Chasiv Yar areas of the Donetsk regions under Commander Validol, the battalion consists of prison inmates who have volunteered to serve militarily, prematurely ending their sentences. Selection for recruits began in July 2024, by August the battalion was engaging in missions.

Inmates convicted of treason or corruption are barred from joining the battalion.

Since December 2024, Canadian volunteer April Huggett has been serving as a combat medic and PR officer for the Alcatraz Battalion.

In June 2025, the organization 3XM – Green Cross MedEvac, led by the Austrian volunteer Markus "Max" Pollak, took over the tactical-medical training of recruits for the Alcatraz Battalion.

== See also ==
- Ukrainian penal military units during the Russian invasion of Ukraine
  - Shkval Battalion
  - Kharakternyky Battalion (24th Mechanized Brigade)
