= Ruslan Shevchuk =

Ukrainian soldier

- Руслан Шевчук
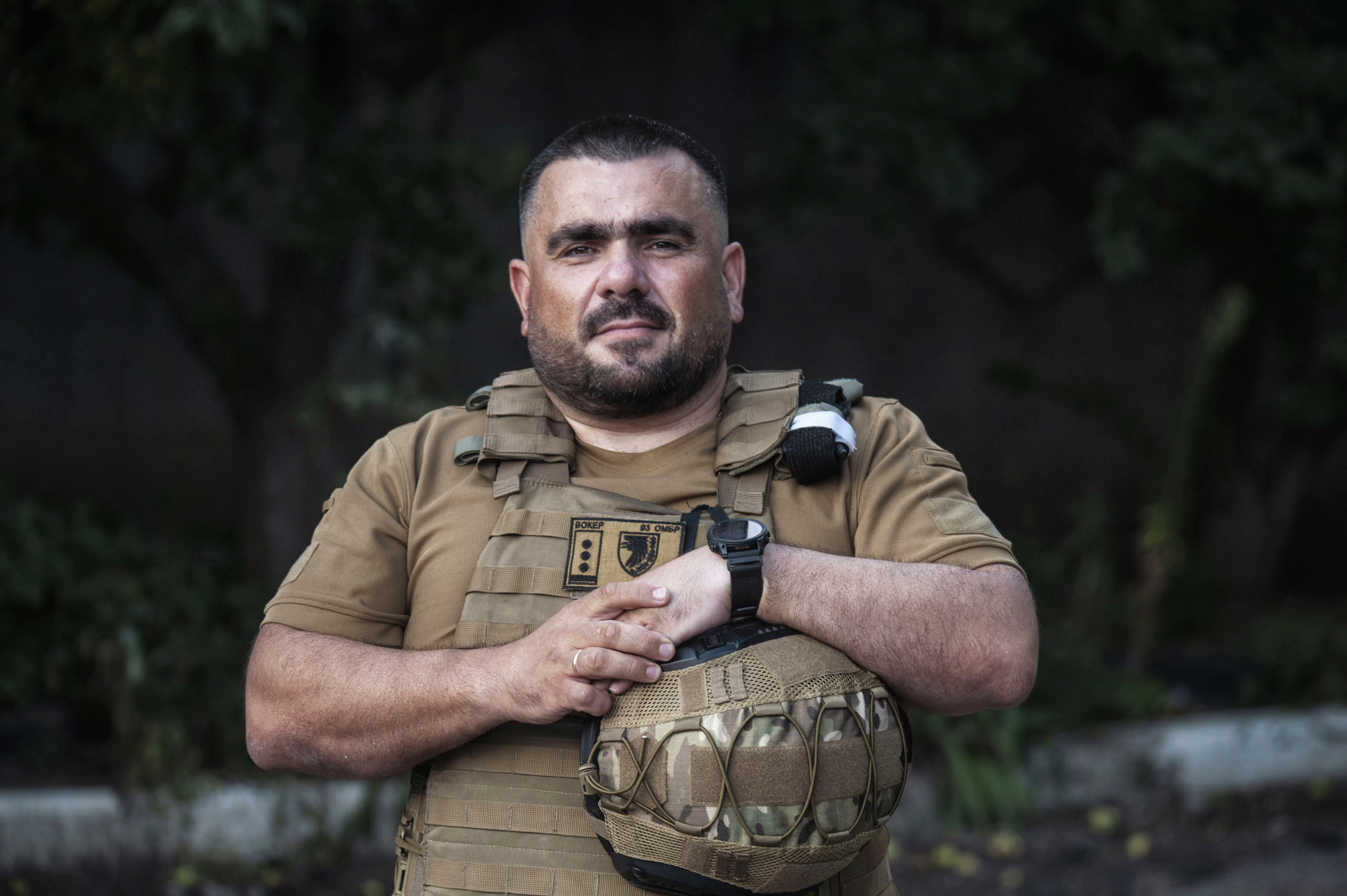

Personal details
- Born: Ruslan Mykolayovych Shevchuk

Military service
- Allegiance: Ukraine
- Branch/service: Ukrainian Ground Forces; Mechanized Infantry; Operational Command East; 93rd Mechanized Brigade
- Rank: Brigadier General
- Commands: 15th Army Corps
- Battles/wars: Russo-Ukrainian War; War in Donbas; 2022 Russian invasion of Ukraine; Battle of Kharkiv (2022); Battle of Okhtyrka; Battle of Trostianets; Battle of Bakhmut; Battle of Soledar
- Awards: Order of Bohdan Khmelnytskyi

Ruslan Mykolayovych Shevchuk (Ukrainian: Руслан Миколайович Шевчук) is a Ukrainian soldier, brigadier general of the Armed Forces of Ukraine, a participant of the Russian-Ukrainian war. After January 21, 2022, he was the commander of the 93rd Mechanized Brigade "Kholodnyi Yar". As of 2026 he is the commander of the 15th Army Corps.

== Biography ==
Ruslan Shevchuk proved himself to be a successful performer of tasks during the Combined Resolve XII multinational exercises at the JMRC Hohenfels Center in Germany in 2019, when the brigade's mechanized company received high marks from American instructor observers and strengthened the authority of the Armed Forces of Ukraine among the armies of Ukraine's partner countries.

He served as the deputy commander of the 93rd separate mechanized brigade "Kholodnyi Yar", and since January 21, 2022, he has been the commander of the same brigade.

On February 24, 2026, he was awarded the rank of Brigadier General.

== Awards ==
- Order of Bohdan Khmelnytskyi, II class (20 June 2022)
- Order of Bohdan Khmelnytskyi, III class (11 May 2022)
