= 158th Mechanized Brigade =

Ukrainian Ground Forces unit

158th Separate Mechanized Brigade
- 158-ма окрема механізована бригада
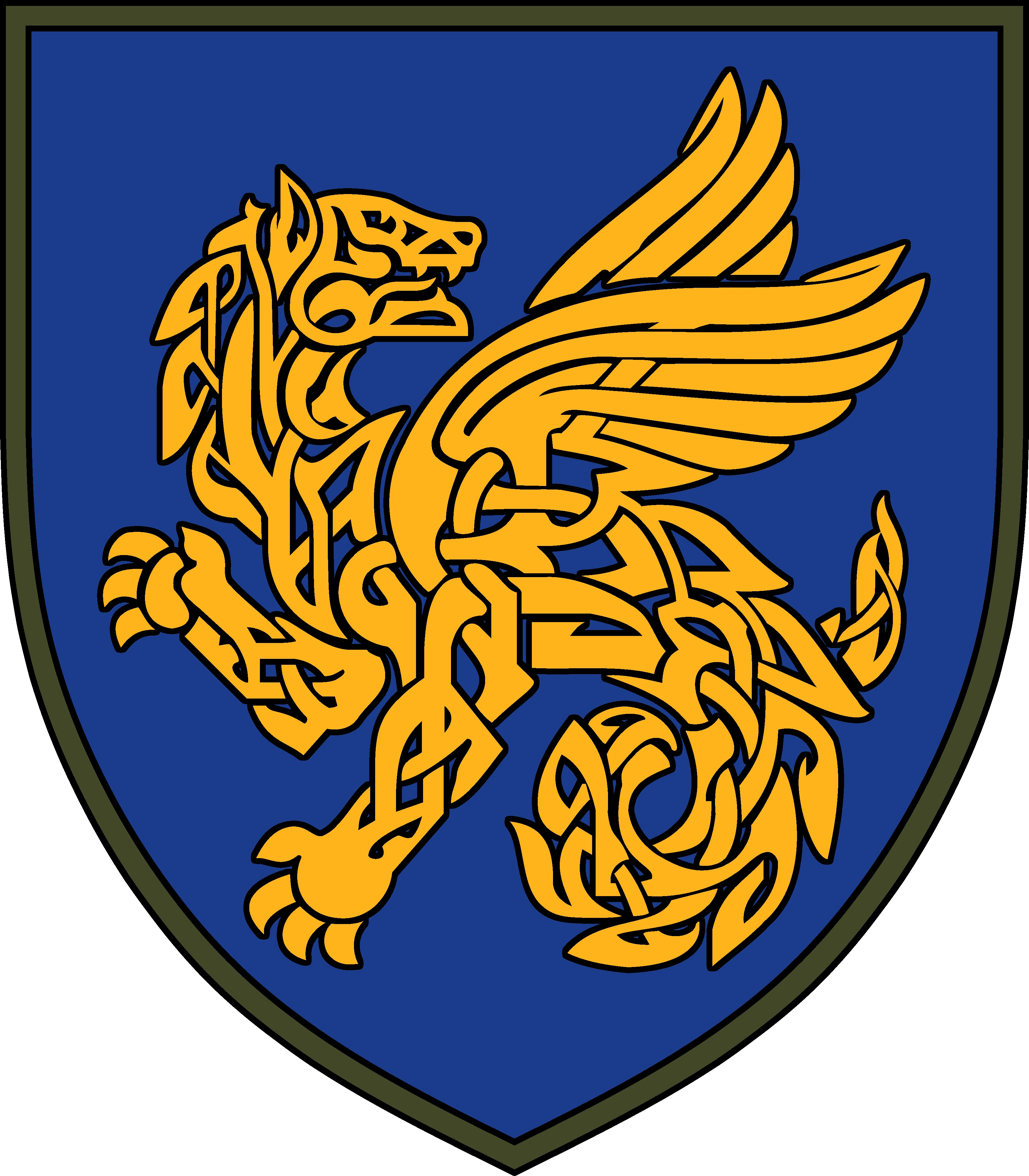
- Insignia of the brigade
- Active: 2 February 2024 – present
- Country: Ukraine
- Branch: Ukrainian Ground Forces
- Role: Mechanized Infantry
- Part of: Operational Command North
- Garrison/HQ: Chernihiv; MUN A5002
- Engagements: Russo-Ukrainian war; Russian invasion of Ukraine
- Website: Official Website

Commanders
- Current commander: Colonel Vitaly Omelchenko

Insignia
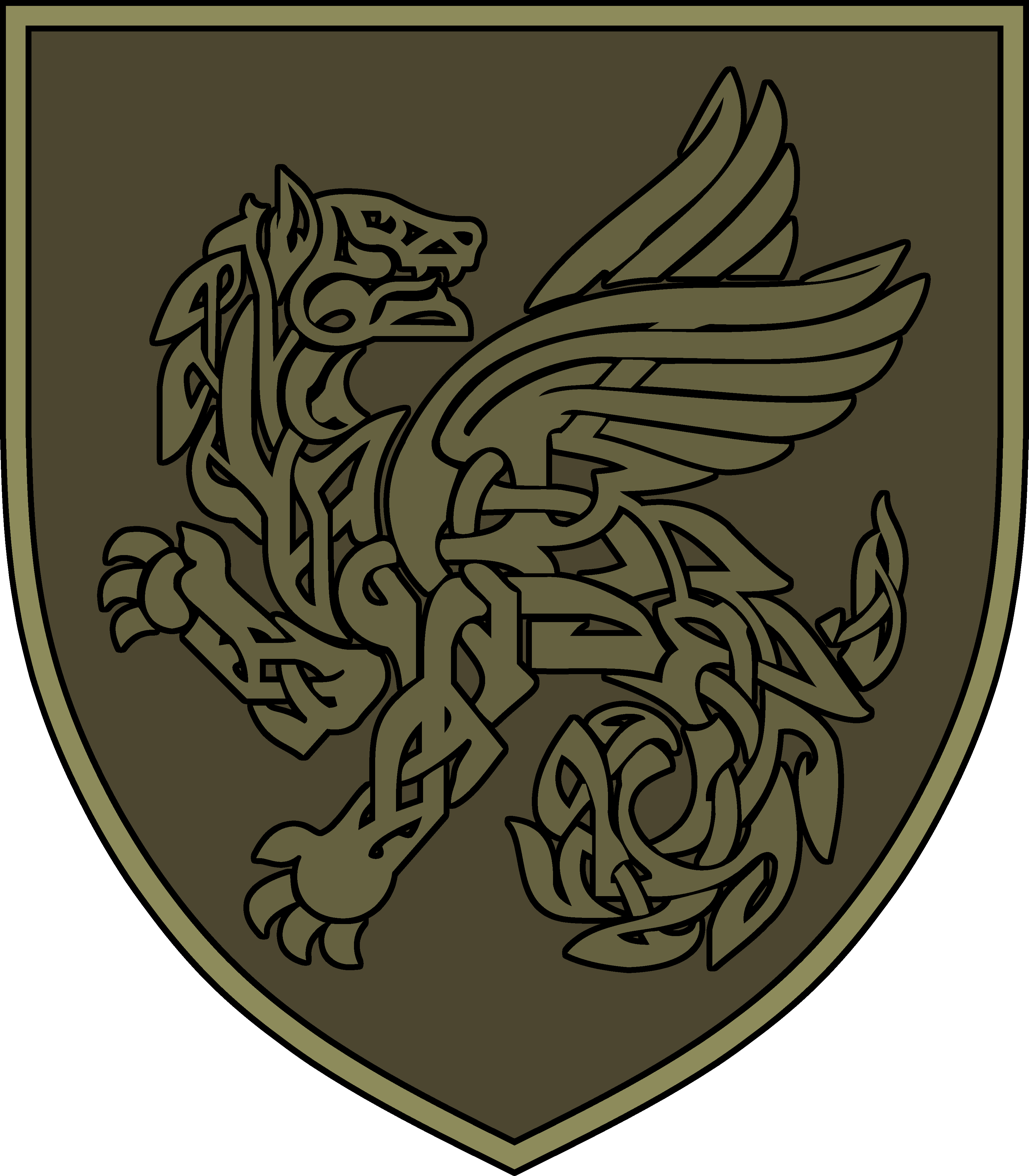
- Subdued Insignia

The 158th Separate Mechanized Brigade (Ukrainian: 158-ма окрема механізована бригада) is a unit of the Ukrainian Ground Forces formed in Chernihiv. The brigade was part of the creation of nine other brigades in the Ukrainian Ground Forces, announced by then Ground Forces' commander Lieutenant General Oleksandr Pavliuk, in anticipation of a Russian offensive.

== History ==
=== Formation ===
The brigade was formed after a Ukrainian mobilization law came into force, seeing the draft age being lowered from 27 to 25 and placing penalties for those avoiding conscription. This law also saw prisoners being able to join the armed forces.

In an interview with The Economist published in an article on 10 May 2024, Oleksandr Pavliuk, then commander of the Ukrainian Ground Forces, stated that Ukraine planned to create 10 new brigades in anticipation of a Russian offensive, and that some of them could be stationed in Kyiv to defend the city. Later in the month, Forbes reported that these 10 new brigades would consist of 2,000 people and some of them would be infantry rather than mechanized brigades.

On 16 July 2024, the Chernihiv Regional State Administration publicized a video calling for individuals to join the brigade. It was noted that drivers, doctors, cooks, and other roles were needed.

In November 2024, the brigade was reformed from an infantry to a mechanized unit.

== Structure ==
As of July 2025, the brigade's structure is as follows:

- 158th Separate Mechanized Brigade
  - Brigade Headquarters
    - Management
    - Commandant Platoon
  - 1st Mechanized Battalion
  - 2nd Mechanized Battalion
  - 3rd Mechanized Battalion
  - 1st Rifle Battalion
  - 2nd Rifle Battalion
  - Tank Battalion
  - Artillery Group
    - HQ
    - Target Acquisition Unit
    - 1st Self-Propelled Artillery Battalion
    - 2nd Self-Propelled Artillery Battalion
    - Rocket Artillery Unit
    - Anti-Tank Unit
  - Anti-Aircraft Defense Battalion
  - Drone Battalion
  - Reconnaissance Company
  - Engineer Battalion
  - CBRN Protection Company
  - Logistic Battalion
  - Radar Company
  - Maintenance Battalion
  - Medical Company
  - Signal Company

== Equipment ==
=== Vehicles ===
- HMMWV – American infantry mobility vehicle
- International MaxxPro – American MRAP armored fighting vehicle
- T-64BV – Soviet main battle tank
