= Zavody =

Village in Kharkiv Oblast, Ukraine

Zavody Заводи
- Village
- Location of Peremoha Zavody (Ukraine)
- Coordinates: 49°09′15″N 37°04′04″E
- Country: Ukraine
- Oblast: Kharkiv Oblast
- Raion: Izium Raion
- Hromada: Oskil rural hromada
- Elevation: 154 m (505 ft)

Population (2001)
  - Total: 516
- Time zone: UTC+2
  - Summer (DST): UTC+3
- Postal code: 64350
- Area code: +380 5743

Zavody (Ukrainian: Заводи) is a village in the Izium Raion, Kharkiv Oblast (province) of eastern Ukraine. It is part of the Oskil rural hromada, one of the hromadas of Ukraine.
