= Kharakternyky Battalion =

- Батальйон Характерники
- Active: 2024 – Present
- Allegiance: Ukraine
- Type: Penal battalion
- Role: Assault troops
- Size: 400–800
- Part of: 24th Mechanized Brigade
- Nickname: Wizards Battalion
- Patron: Daniel of Galicia
- Engagements: Russian Invasion of Ukraine: Battle of Chasiv Yar

Commanders
- Current commander: Unknown

At the beginning of July 2024 reports of the "Kharakternyky" Ukrainian convicts battalion started to appear.

Prisoners who are barred from recruitment include those convicted of the murder of two or more people, rape, sexual violence, terrorism and treason. If a member of the battalion would attempt to desert or retreat without authorisation, an additional 5 to 10 years would be added to their sentence. Protection for Prisoners of Ukraine leader, Oleg Tsvily said that his organization "supports the idea behind the law but the text that was passed is discriminatory". He also raised concerns about convicts being abused by their commanders and used as cannon fodder saying "Some commanders treat even ordinary mobilised people badly, why would it be different for prisoners?"

The battalion was reported to have 400 to 800 members. The battalion is attached to the 24th Mechanized Brigade.

On 14 September 2024, a member of the battalion who was identified as "Serhiy P", a convict who was serving a sentence of 5 years and 6 months in prison for "intentional grievous bodily harm" had an extra year added onto his sentence after he "refused to comply with the order of the company commander to rotate and replace servicemen at one of the strongholds in the Donetsk region."

== See also ==
- Ukrainian penal military units during the Russian invasion of Ukraine
  - Shkval Battalion
    - Alcatraz Battalion
