= 34th Convoy Battalion (Ukraine) =

34th Separate Convoy Battalion
- 34-й окремий батальйон НГ (Ukrainian)
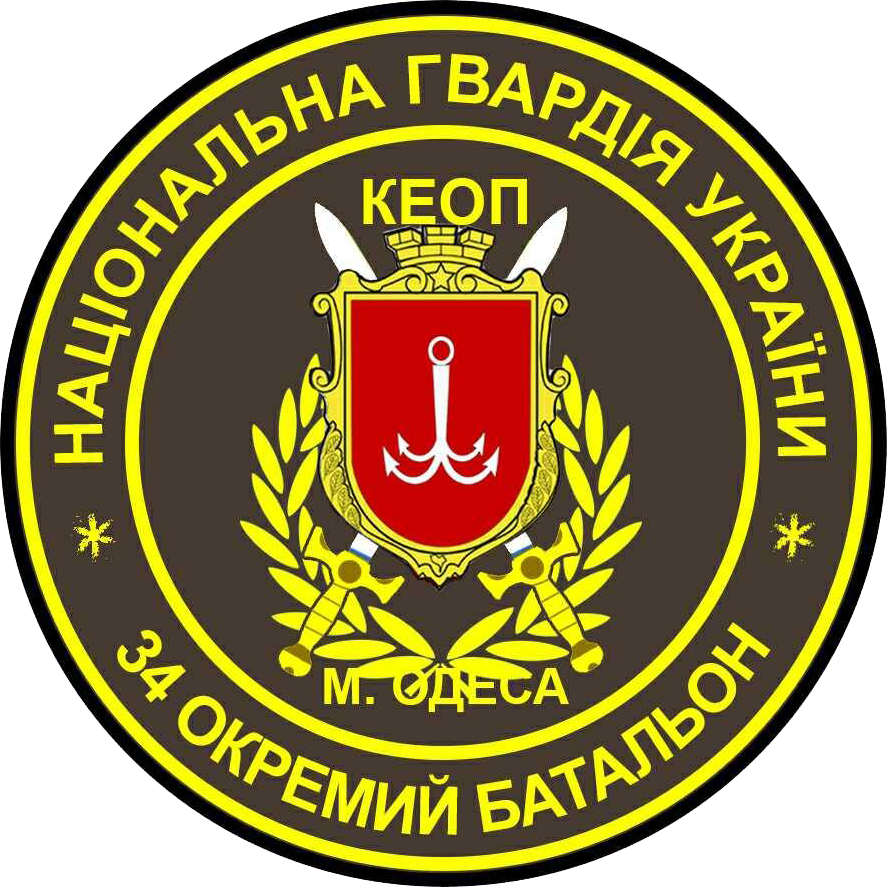
- Battalion Insignia
- Founded: 2011
- Country: Ukraine
- Allegiance: Ministry of Internal Affairs
- Branch: National Guard of Ukraine
- Type: Battalion
- Role: Transport
- Part of: National Guard of Ukraine
- Garrison/HQ: Odessa
- Engagements: Russo-Ukrainian war: War in Donbas; Russian invasion of Ukraine; Odesa strikes (2022–present)

Commanders
- Current commander: Lieutenant Colonel Oleksandr Kanava

The 34th Separate Convoy Battalion is a battalion of the National Guard of Ukraine tasked mostly with transport and escort operations as well as the protection of Ukrainian territorial integrity. It was established in 2011 and is garrisoned at Odessa.

== History ==
It was established in 2011 in Odessa as a part of the Internal Troops of Ukraine.

During 6-8 August 2012, around 50 soldiers of the Battalion were poisoned via food prompting an investigation.

In 2014, it was transferred to the National Guard of Ukraine and saw combat during the War in Donbass.

Following the Russian invasion of Ukraine, the Battalion has engaged Russian forces including during the Attacks on Odessa.

== Structure ==
The structure of the battalion is as follows:

- 34th Convoy Battalion
  - 1st Rifle Company
  - 2nd Rifle Company
  - 3rd Rifle Company
  - Combat and Logistical Support Company
  - Automobile Company
  - Commandant Platoon
  - Observational Platoon
  - Medical Center
  - Canine Group

== Commanders ==
- Lieutenant Colonel Oleksandr Kanava

== Sources ==
- У військовій частині 3014 м. Одеси впроваджують пілотний проєкт реформи харчування та переходять на стандарти НАТО
- У військовій частині 3014 м Одеси продовжуються практичні тренінгові заняття з молодим поповненням
- Капелани благословили новобранців на несення військової служби
