= 2nd State Objects Protection Regiment (Ukraine) =

2nd Shostkinsky Special State Objects Guard Regiment
- 2-й полк охорони особливо важливих державних об'єктів (Ukrainian)
- Regimental Insignia
- Founded: 1991
- Country: Ukraine
- Allegiance: Ministry of Internal Affairs
- Branch: National Guard of Ukraine
- Type: Regiment
- Role: Protection of Strategic Sites
- Size: ~300
- Part of: National Guard of Ukraine
- Garrison/HQ: Shostka
- Nickname: Shostkinsky
- Engagements: Russo-Ukrainian war: Russian invasion of Ukraine
- Decorations: For Courage and Bravery

Commanders
- Current commander: Colonel Maxim Kitseluk

Insignia
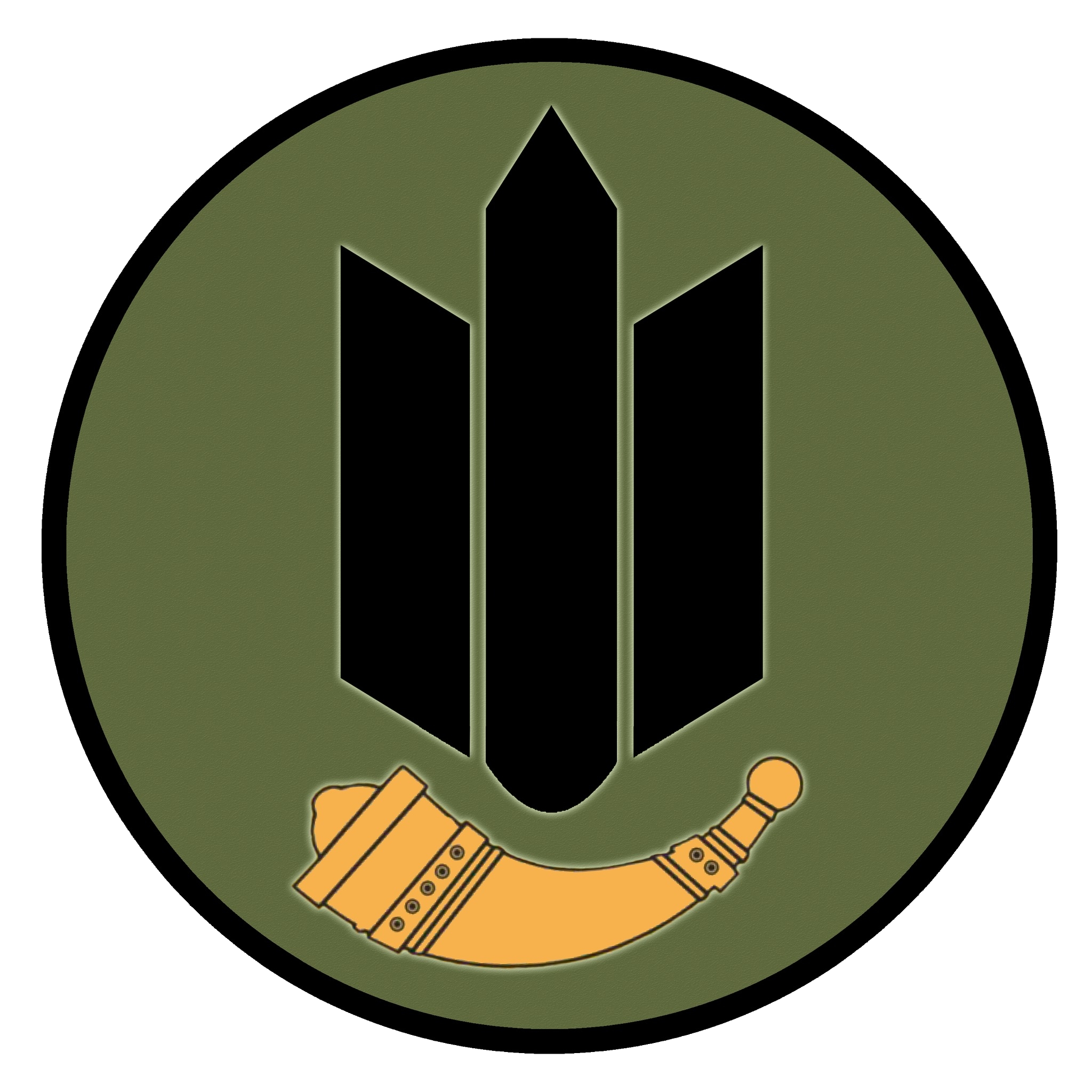
- Former insignia

UGV of the Regiment

The 2nd Shostkinsky Special State Objects Guard Regiment is a regiment of the National Guard of Ukraine tasked with the protection of strategically important sites, especially those in Sumy Oblast. It was established in 1991 on the basis of 467th Special Units Regiment of the Internal Troops of the Soviet Union as a part of the Internal Troops of Ukraine. It is headquartered at Shostka.

== History ==
It was established on 28 November 1952 as the 467th Special Units Regiment of the Internal Troops of the Soviet Union which on 30 September 1991 was transferred to the Internal Troops of Ukraine becoming the 2nd Separate Regiment. Since 1993, the regiment has been tasked with the defense of strategic sites, residential areas and railway routes utilizing personnel, weapons, automobile equipment, communication and a wide range of technical means. In 1999, the regiment was presented with a combat flag. From 2008 to 2020, the State Research Institute of Dielectrics was also guarded by the regiment. In 2017, the regiment's composition was reformed.

On 13 October 2021, on the island of Khortytsia, the 2nd Regiment was awarded the honorary name "Shostkinsky" and a ribbon with an honorary title was awarded to the commander of the regiment, Colonel Maksym Kitseluk.

Following the Russian invasion of Ukraine, the regiment saw intensive combat. During the invasion, a soldier of the regiment (Anatoly Viktorovych Shapovalov) was killed on 11 March and three other soldiers of the regiment (Biryuk Vyacheslav Mykolayovych, Kolyada Anatoliy Yuriyovych and Andrii Hermanovych Kagalniak) on 30 March 2022.

On 11 February 2023, the regiment was awarded the honorary award "For Courage and Bravery".

== Structure ==
The structure of the regiment is as follows:

- 2nd State Object Protection Regiment
  - Management and headquarters
  - 1st Operational Battalion
    - 1st Operational Armoured Vehicle Company
    - 2nd Operational Armoured Vehicle Company
    - 3rd Operational Armoured Vehicle Company
    - Mortar Battery
    - Anti-tank Platoon
    - Grenade launcher Platoon
    - Communications Platoon
  - 2nd Operational Battalion
    - 1st Operational BMP Company
    - 2nd Operational BMP Company
    - 3rd Operational BMP Company
    - Mortar Battery
    - Anti-tank Platoon
    - Grenade launcher Platoon
    - Communications Platoon
  - Howitzer Artillery Division
  - Anti-aircraft Missile Division
  - Special Intelligence and Reconnaissance Company
  - ATGM Company
  - Operational Special Purpose Company
  - Logistical and Technical Support Company
  - Repair Company
  - Engineering Company
  - Commandant Company
  - Combat Support Company
  - Communications Node
  - Medical Center

== Commanders ==
- Colonel Vyacheslav Kryvenok (18 July 2014 - 27 January 2017)
- Colonel Oleksandr Zhelnovach (27 January 2017 - 22 April 2021)
- Colonel Maxim Kitseluk (22 April 2021-)

== Sources ==
- Шосткинські гвардійці затримали порушника забороненої зони
- У Шостці перевірили спецпризначенців Нацгвардії
- Шосткинські нацгвардійці стали кращими у футзалі
- Військова частина 3022 святкувала свій День народження
- Військова частина 3022 отримала 4 КРАЗИ
- Шостка. Військова частина 3022. Відповіді командира шосткинській самообороні.
- Військова частина 3022 концертом святкує другу річницю Національної гвардії
- Звернення командира угруповання «Полісся» в/ч 3022 Національної гвардії України підполковника Волинця В. М.
- Військова частина 3022 набирає резервістів
- Шосткинская воинская часть 3022 отметила 63-ю годовщину со дня создания
- У Шостці проводиться польовий вихід з відділенням РХБ захисту
