= 31st Cherkasy Regiment (Ukraine) =

31st Separate Regiment
- 31-й окремий НГ полк (Ukrainian)
- Regiment Insignia
- Founded: 2001
- Country: Ukraine
- Allegiance: Ministry of Internal Affairs
- Branch: National Guard of Ukraine
- Type: Regiment
- Role: Protection of Ukrainian territorial integrity
- Part of: National Guard of Ukraine
- Garrison/HQ: Cherkasy
- Nickname: Cherkasy
- Engagements: Russo-Ukrainian war: War in Donbass; Battle of Mariupol; 2022 Russian invasion of Ukraine

Commanders
- Current commander: Colonel Mykhailo Zhukovsky

The 31st Cherkasy Regiment is a regiment of the National Guard of Ukraine tasked with escort, transportation, law enforcement and protection of the Ukrainian territorial integrity. It was established on 10 January 2001, as the 25th Separate Battalion on the basis of the 4th battalion of the 1st Convoy Brigade. Its headquarters in Cherkasy.

== History ==
On 10 January 2001, it was established as the 25th Separate Battalion on the basis of the 4th battalion of the 1st Convoy Brigade in Cherkasy as a part of the Internal Troops of Ukraine tasked with the protection of public order in Cherkasy and escorting convicts and defendants. (Note: Soldiers in wartime)

In 2014, the Battalion became a part of the National Guard of Ukraine. Its personnel saw action during the War in Donbass, first deployed to quell the pro-Russian unrest in Kharkiv and Donetsk and then to take part in the Battle of Mariupol but saw limited combat carrying out mostly support, patrol and escort missions during which they took part in a few engagements with separatists.

The 25th Separate Battalion was expanded in 2022 becoming the 31st Regiment.

== Structure ==
- Management and Headquarters
- Patrol Battalion
- Convoy Battalion
- Special Purpose Company

== Commanders ==
- Lieutenant Colonel Andrii Savchuk (?-2017)
- Lieutenant Colonel Vasyl Selezen (2017–2020)
- Colonel Mykhailo Zhukovsky (2020-)

== Sources ==
- Андрій САВЧУК: «Сил, які маємо сьогодні, достатньо, щоб захистити країну»
- Черкащан запрошують служити у лавах Національної гвардії України
- Черкаські нацгвардійці продемонстрували свою бойову підготовку
- Військовослужбовці Національної гвардії України відзначили річницю створення
