= 19th Convoy Battalion (Ukraine) =

19th Convoy Protection Battalion
- 19-й окремий батальйон НГ (Ukrainian)
- Founded: 1992
- Country: Ukraine
- Allegiance: Ministry of Internal Affairs
- Branch: National Guard of Ukraine
- Type: Battalion
- Role: Transport
- Part of: National Guard of Ukraine
- Garrison/HQ: Zaporizhzhia
- Anniversaries: 22 February
- Engagements: Russo-Ukrainian war: War in Donbas; Russian invasion of Ukraine; 2023 Ukrainian counteroffensive

Commanders
- Current commander: Lieutenant Colonel Serhiy Shcherbyna

The 19th Separate Convoy Battalion is a battalion of the National Guard of Ukraine tasked with transport and escort. It was established in 1992 and is garrisoned in Zaporizhzhia. Following the Russian invasion of Ukraine, its tasks expanded to the protection of Ukrainian territorial integrity and has this seen combat during the 2023 Ukrainian counteroffensive.

== History ==
It was established in 1992 following the Dissolution of the Soviet Union as a part of the National Guard of Ukraine and was then transferred to Internal Troops of Ukraine, it was again transferred back to the National Guard of Ukraine in 2014 following its reestablishment.

On 22 February 2017, the battalion celebrated the 60th anniversary of its establishment. On 28 August 2017, the Battalion was presented with a Combat Flag. It also received 323 thousand hryvnias in aid in 2017 to strengthen the Battalion.

Following the Russian invasion of Ukraine, the battalion saw combat mostly in Zaporizhzhia Oblast seeing action during the 2023 Ukrainian counteroffensive. On 2 February 2024, a soldier of the battalion (Bohdan Solyanyk) was killed as a result of a mortar strike while serving near Mala Tokmachka. In 2024, a spy working for the Russian Federation and a member of the Communist Party of Ukraine provided classified information about the battalion but was apprehended and sentenced to 15 years in prison.

== Structure ==
- 1st Rifle Platoon
- 2nd Rifle Platoon
- 3rd Rifle Platoon
- Automobile Platoon
- Medical Center

== Commanders ==
- Lieutenant Colonel Serhiy Shcherbyna (2019-)

== Sources ==
- Військова частина 3026 відзначила свою 60-ту річницю
- Присяга военнослужащих в/ч 3033,3026
- Як у Запоріжжі відзначатимуть День Нацгвардії
