= 32nd Volyn Battalion (Ukraine) =

32nd Separate Battalion
- 32-й окремий батальйон НГ (Ukrainian)
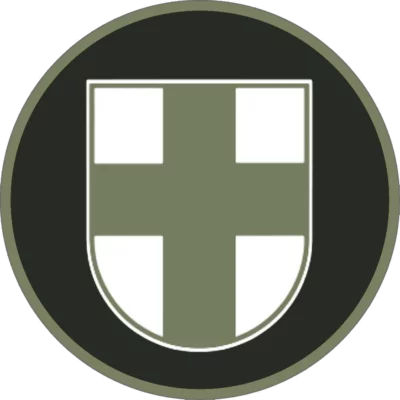
- Battalion Insignia
- Founded: 1994
- Country: Ukraine
- Allegiance: Ministry of Internal Affairs
- Branch: National Guard of Ukraine
- Type: Battalion
- Role: Multipurpose
- Part of: National Guard of Ukraine
- Garrison/HQ: Volyn
- Engagements: Russo-Ukrainian war: War in Donbas; Battle of Mariupol; Russian invasion of Ukraine; Northern Ukraine campaign; Southern Ukraine campaign

Commanders
- Current commander: Lieutenant Colonel Volodymyr Oliynyk

The 32nd Volyn Battalion is a battalion of the National Guard of Ukraine tasked with various duties including the protection of Public Order, Ukrainian territorial integrity and foreign diplomatic missions. It was established in 1994 and is currently headquartered in Volyn.

== History ==
On 3 June 1994, the 16th Separate Battalion was established at Ulyaniki on the basis of the Missile regiment of the 37th Guards Missile Division of the Soviet Armed Forces. On 6 October 1994, it was transferred to Lutsk where on 10 June 1998, all separate battalions it became the 16th Special Purpose Battalion which was transferred to the Internal Troops of Ukraine on 17 December 1999.

Throughout 90s, the main tasks of the battalion included thwarting of small scale crimes mostly involving the stealing of copper and protection of borders, thwarting illegal crossing attempts in cooperation with the State Border Guard Service of Ukraine.

In 2000s, the battalion saw action mostly in law enforcement and thwarting of robberies including carrying out of operations in civilian clothes in some cases. They also maintained public order in Kyiv and Western Ukraine especially during the visits of the President of Ukraine and President of Poland, the Pope and during census.

In 2014 it was transferred to the National Guard of Ukraine as the 32nd Separate Battalion. After the Russian invasion of Crimea and the start of the War in Donbass, the battalion was deployed to the ATO zone to take part in combat in Donetsk Oblast and Luhansk Oblast. It took part in the First Battle of Mariupol and on 9 May 2014, the personnel of the battalion engaged separatists occupying the office of the Ministry of Internal Affairs of Ukraine successfully liberating it, during the battle, the battalion's commander and another serviceman were wounded.

On 14 August 2017, a cross was installed at the construction site of the Church of the Battalion whose foundation was laid by Lieutenant Colonel Vasyl Gurtovskyi, commander of the battalion. A Golden Crucifix was also awarded to the battalion.

Following the Russian invasion of Ukraine, the battalion saw action during the Northern Ukraine campaign defending the border with Belarus in addition to maintaining public order and curfew in various cities. The battalion also destroyed several Russian UAVs during the war. The medics of the battalion operated in Zaporizhzhia Oblast to heal the wounded. In June 2022, the battalion along with the National Police of Ukraine carried out a search operation in 60 settlements in Volyn Oblast and captured two Belarusian military uniforms, one RPG, guns, 1000+ rounds of ammunition, TNTs, anti-tank mines, knives, walkie-talkies and drugs suspected to be linked to the Belarusian involvement in the Russian invasion of Ukraine. The battalion also received ANTIDRON KVS G-6+ anti-UAV weapons to aid in their shootdown of Russian UAVs.

On 28 April 2024, the battalion was presented with a Combat Flag.

== Structure ==
The structure of the battalion is as follows:

- Rifle Company
- 1st Patrol Company
- 2nd Patrol Company
- Canine Platoon
- Logistical and Technical Support Platoon
- Orchestra
- Security Platoon for Consular Institutions and Foreign Diplomatic Missions

== Commanders ==
- Lieutenant Colonel Volodymyr Oliynyk

== Sources ==
- Військова частина в Луцьку святкує день народження
- Військова частина Нацгвардії 1141 міста Луцька потребує допомоги
- Волинським нацгвардійцям повернули бойовий стяг
- Сьогодні військова частина 1141 святкує 22-у річницю з дня створення
