= 14th National Guard Battalion (Ukraine) =

14th Separate Battalion
- 14-й окремий батальйон НГ (Ukrainian)
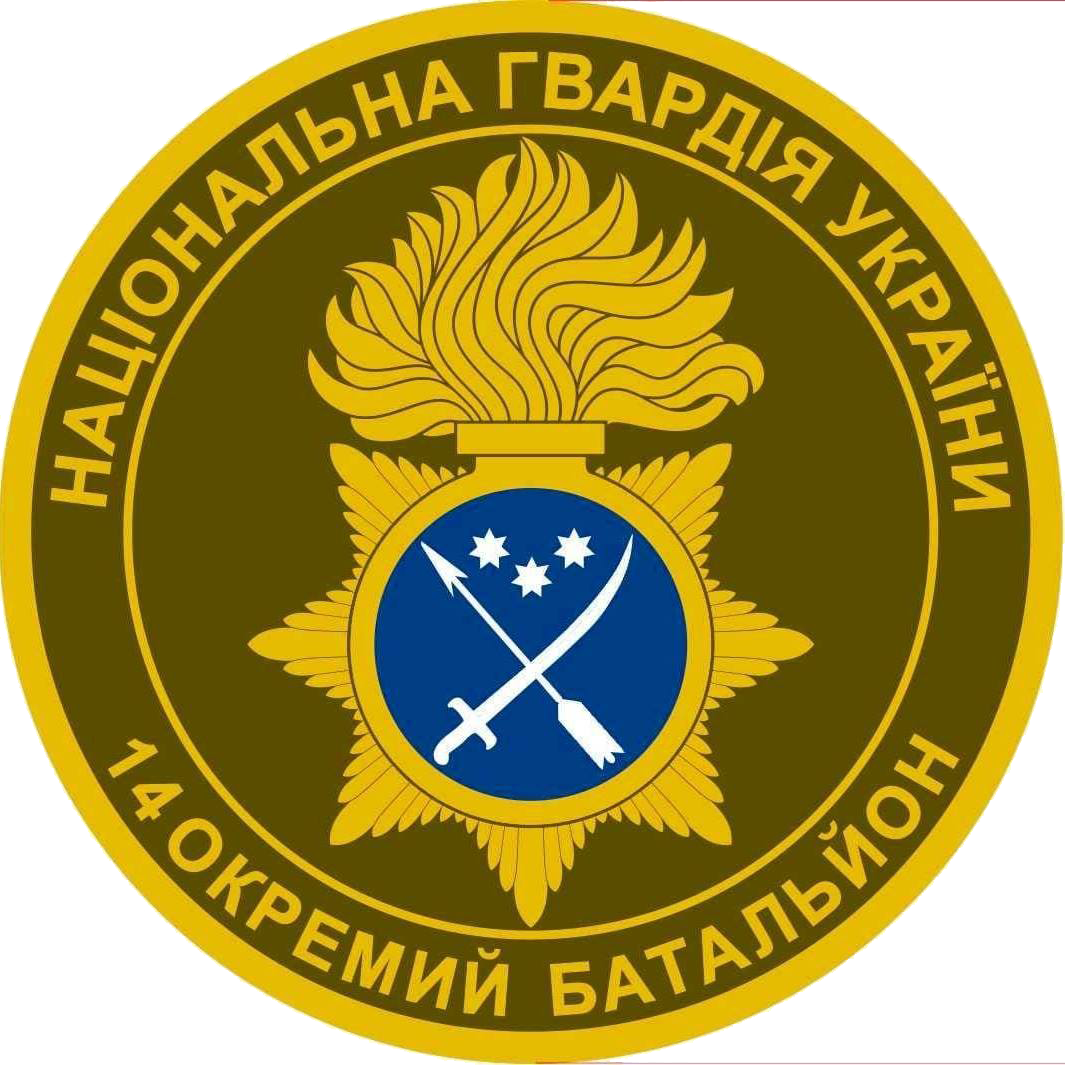
- Battalion Insignia
- Founded: 1992
- Country: Ukraine
- Allegiance: Ministry of Internal Affairs
- Branch: National Guard of Ukraine
- Type: Battalion
- Role: Multipurpose
- Part of: Central Territorial Command
- Garrison/HQ: Dnipro
- Engagements: Russo-Ukrainian war: War in Donbass; 2022 Russian invasion of Ukraine

Commanders
- Current commander: Lieutenant Colonel Ihor Kalinovsky Vladimirovich

The 14th National Guard Battalion is a battalion of the National Guard of Ukraine tasked with protection of public law and order as well as the Ukrainian territorial integrity. It was established in 1992 and is headquartered in Dnipro.

== History ==
It was established in 1992 as a part of the National Guard of Ukraine and was later transferred to the Internal Troops of Ukraine.

In 2014, the battalion was transferred to the National Guard of Ukraine after its reestablishment. Amidst the 2014 pro-Russian unrest in Ukraine, on the night of 5 April 2014, a group of 7 armed men approached the battalion's barracks in Dnipro, they started shouting and rioting whole pretending to be drunk. A soldier of the regiment (Sergeant Martynenko) approached them and told them to behave quietly but the men attacked them killing the soldier on spot. Then the attackers attacked the other positions but by then, the soldiers had raised the alarm and the guardsmen opened fire. Heavy combat continued and two Companies of the battalion came as reinforcement along with BTR-80 armored vehicles. The attackers tried to flee but faced casualties of one attacker killed and three wounded, in the end all remaining were arrested and 7 Makarov pistols, 2 Kalashnikov assault rifles, and 4 grenades were seized from the attackers. It took part in the War in Donbass seeing combat in Donetsk Oblast in 2016.

It won third place in the Dynamo football tournament in 2024.

== Structure ==
- 14th National Guard Battalion
  - Management & Headquarters
  - 1st Rifle Company
  - 2nd Rifle Company
  - Combat and Logistical Support Company
  - Medical Center

== Commanders ==
- Lieutenant Colonel Ihor Kalinovsky Vladimirovich (2019-)

== Sources ==
- Гвардійці військової частини 3054 відвідали виставку до 330-річчя від обрання І. С. Мазепи гетьманом
- Військовослужбовці НГУ та поліції відпрацювали дії при виникненні екстремальних ситуацій
