= 1st State Objects Protection Regiment (Ukraine) =

1st Dnipropetrovsk Regiment for the Protection of particularly important State Objects
- 1-й полк охорони особливо важливих державних об'єктів (Ukrainian)
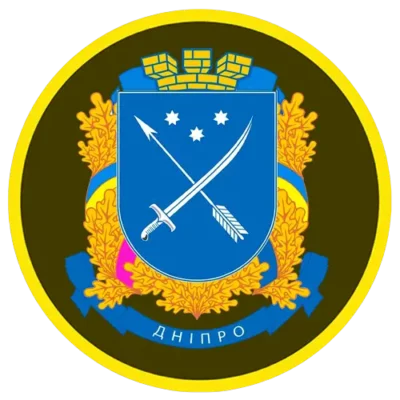
- Regimental Insignia
- Founded: 1991
- Country: Ukraine
- Allegiance: Ministry of Internal Affairs
- Branch: National Guard of Ukraine
- Type: Regiment
- Role: Protection of Strategic Sites
- Part of: National Guard of Ukraine
- Garrison/HQ: Dnipro
- Engagements: Russo-Ukrainian war

Commanders
- Current commander: Colonel Andriy Manko

The 1st Dnipropetrovsk Regiment for the Protection of particularly important State Objects is a regiment of the National Guard of Ukraine tasked with the protection of strategically important sites such as the PA Pivdenmash and the Dnipro Machine-Building Plant. It was established in 1991 and is currently headquartered at Dnipro although formerly a Battalion of the regiment was Garrisoned in Rubizhne as well.

== History ==
It traces origins to the 466th Special Units Regiment of the Internal Troops of the Soviet Union established on 28 November 1968.

On 30 September 1991, it became part of the Internal Troops of Ukraine as the 1st Separate Dnipropetrovsk Regiment.

Until 2015, the regiment also carried out security and defense of LLC NVP "Zorya" in Rubizhne. The regiment's Rifle Company in Rubizhne was disbanded in 2015. It saw action during the War in Donbass with a soldier (Oleg Mykolayovych Yakovchenko) dying as a result of wounds on 6 August 2015. Its tasks then shifted to the defense of PA Pivdenmash, the Dnipro Machine-Building Plant and other strategically important sites.

On 17 January 2018, a soldier (Mansur Mansurovych Verzhakovskii) of the regiment was killed under undisclosed circumstances followed by another soldier (Kiba Andrii Andriyovych) on 12 July 2019 under similarly mysterious circumstances.

On 27 January 2022, at the PA Pivdenmash in Dnipro, a soldier of the regiment, Artemiy Ryabchuk, during the handing out of weapons, attacked his fellow guardsmen using an AK-47, the ensuing gun battle resulted in the death of four personnel of the regiment (Oleksandr Oleksandrovich Buganov, Dragan Oleksandr Oleksandrovych, Artem Volodymyrovych Levkivskyi and Chernyk Leonid Leonidovych) and a female worker at the site. The resulting investigation revealed that the officers of the regiment were involved in multiple human rights violations on the conscripts serving in the regiment including physical and psychological torture. As a result of this incident, the commander of national guard Mykola Balan along with the first deputy, the chief of staff, the commander of the regiment and the deputy commander of the regiment were removed from their positions.

== Structure ==
- 1st Rifle Battalion (Dnipro)
- 2nd Rifle Battalion
- ~~3rd Rifle Battalion (Rubizhne)~~
- 4th Rifle Battalion (Dnipro)
- Special Commandant's office for Special Cargo Protection
- Special Commandant's office for Special Object Protection
- Special Purpose Platoon
- Reserve Rifle Company
- Robotic Intelligence Complex Department

== Commanders ==
- Colonel Vitaly Kosyachenko (?-2022)
- Colonel Andriy Manko (2022-)

== History ==
- В/Ч 3021(ПРИСЯГА ВЕСНА 2011) 2
- Дніпропетровщина сподівається на краще, але готується до найгіршого
- У військовій частині 3021 Національної гвардії України зустріли молоде поповнення
- 30.06.17 11.00 Урочистості з нагоди 65-ти річчя створення військової частини 3021 Національної гвардії України
- Командування та особовий склад висловлює співчуття рідним та близьким загиблих у Дніпрі. 27.01.2021
