= United National Guard Communications Node (Ukraine) =

United Communications Node
- Об'єднаний вузол зв'язку НГ (Ukrainian)
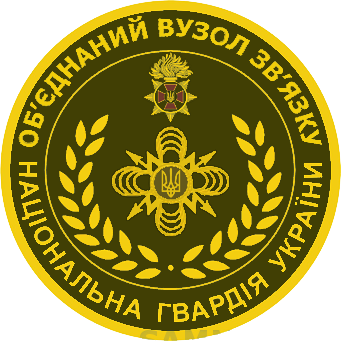
- Brigade Insignia
- Founded: 1992
- Country: Ukraine
- Allegiance: Ministry of Internal Affairs
- Branch: National Guard of Ukraine
- Role: Communications
- Part of: National Guard of Ukraine
- Garrison/HQ: Novi Petrivtsi
- Engagements: Russo-Ukrainian war: Russian invasion of Ukraine

Commanders
- Current commander: Colonel Ruslan Bilous
- Notable commanders: Colonel Petro Mykhailovych Horbatyuk †

The United Communications Node is a communications unit of the National Guard of Ukraine tasked with all sorts of communication including radio, satellite, signals, internet amongst other means of communication. It traces its origins to 1943 as a part of the Internal Troops of the Soviet Union but in Ukraine, it was established in 1992, it is headquartered at Novi Petrivtsi.

== History ==
It traces its origins to 20 August 1943, when a separate communication company was established by the Internal Troops of the Soviet Union in Kharkiv with its first commander bring Captain Ivan Vasylyovych Yanvaryov. On 22 January 1944, it was reformed and transferred to Kyiv. On 14 September 1951, the Separate Communications Company was expanded to a division. On 30 June 1953, in Kyiv, the unit became part of the separate communications division of the Internal Security of the KGB. On 20 March 1954, the Division was reduced to a Company. On 16 May 1960, it was again expanded to a Division. In 1963, the Separate Communications Division was reformed into a battalion.

On 7 February 1992, following the Dissolution of the Soviet Union, the battalion became the 27th Communications Regiment of the National Guard of Ukraine. On 22 March 2000, it was transferred to the Internal Troops of Ukraine. On 30 January 2004, the regiment was renamed to the United Communications Node of the Internal Troops of Ukraine, headquartered at Novi Petrivtsi. On 8 April 2014, it became a part of the National Guard of Ukraine. In 2015, it was subordinated to the General Command. In 2017, the commander of the unit's warehouse was found to have embezzled 2.3 million hryvnias worth of equipment for which he was declared as wanted. On 30 May 2018, a church was consecrated in honor of the Holy Archangel Michael at the unit headquarters. On 31 August 2020, the unit received new radio transmission equipment in the form of 15 R-402.01 and 20 R-402 radio relay stations.

On 24 February 2022, at the start of the Russian invasion of Ukraine, the unit's headquarters was attacked by Russian forces using Missiles. A "Combat alarm" signal was given, and the unit was adapted for function in wartime. Around 05:57, the commander of the unit, Colonel Petro Horbatiuk was reporting to the high command when his command post was hit by a 9K720 Iskander, killing the commander of the unit, Colonel Petro Mykhailovych Horbatyuk.

== Commanders ==
- Colonel Petro Mykhailovych Horbatyuk † (2017–2022)
- Colonel Ruslan Bilous (2022-)

== Sources ==
- Положення про об'єднаний вузол зв'язку Національної гвардії України
- СОЛДАТСКИЕ БУДНИ: И КАШЕВАРЫ МЫ, И ПАСТУХИ
- Закупівлі для армії: завищені ціни, закриті процедури й конкурси з одним учасником
- Проходить тренінг для військовослужбовців Національній гвардії України з розгортання та експлуатації «модулів зв’язку на напівпричепах»
