= National Guard Headquarters Protection & Support Battalion (Ukraine) =

- Окремий батальйон охорони та забезпечення ГУ НГ (Ukrainian)
- National Guard Headquarters Insignia
- Founded: 1992
- Country: Ukraine
- Allegiance: Ministry of Internal Affairs
- Branch: National Guard of Ukraine
- Type: Battalion
- Role: Communications
- Part of: National Guard of Ukraine
- Garrison/HQ: Kyiv
- Engagements: Russo-Ukrainian war: Russian invasion of Ukraine

Commanders
- Current commander: Colonel Vitaly Stepanysko

The National Guard Headquarters Protection & Support Battalion is a battalion subordinated directly to the Headquarters of the National Guard of Ukraine tasked with transport, medical support, combat support, rear support, headquarters protection amongst others. It is headquartered in Kyiv.

== History ==
It was established in 1992 as a part of the National Guard of Ukraine but in 2000, was transferred to the Internal Troops of Ukraine following the disbandment of the National Guard. However it was again transferred to the National Guard following its reestablishment in 2014. On 15 September 2014, the Battalion purchased 40 A-22110s and 10 A-20210s, taking on the role of personnel transport as well. In 2016, further 60 Ataman A-09620 and 59 Etalon vehicles were purchased for transportation purposes. On 2 June 2016, six combat medical emergency vehicles were purchased by the Battalion.

In 2020, the battalion ordered 15,000 military suits for over 15 million hryvnias, but the deal led to three criminal cases, especially Tax evasion, on part of the contractors. In November 2020, the battalion purchased 760,000 respirators for over 6 million hryvnias.

Following the Russian invasion of Ukraine, the battalion saw combat operations.

== Structure ==
- Automobile Company
- Commandant Company
- Guard and Commandant Service Company
- Medical Company
- Transport Company
- Automotive repair shop
- Material and Logistical Support Company

== Commanders ==
- Colonel Anatoly Biruk (2017–2019)
- Colonel Vitaly Stepanysko (2019-)

== Sources ==
- "Біла книга-2016: Національна гвардія України". issuu.com. National Guard of Ukraine. 2017-06-26. Archived from the original on 24 January 2022.
- У Нацгвардії відкрили оновлену їдальню, яка працюватиме за сучасними стандартами
