= 75th Zhytomyr Battalion (Ukraine) =

75th Separate Battalion
- 75-й окремий батальйон НГ (Ukrainian)
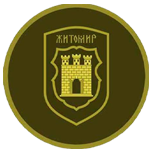
- Battalion Insignia
- Founded: 1992
- Country: Ukraine
- Allegiance: Ministry of Internal Affairs
- Branch: National Guard of Ukraine
- Type: Battalion
- Role: Multipurpose
- Part of: National Guard of Ukraine
- Garrison/HQ: Zhytomyr
- Engagements: Russo-Ukrainian war: Russian invasion of Ukraine

Commanders
- Current commander: Colonel Oleksiy Melnyk

The 75th Zhytomyr Battalion is a battalion of the National Guard of Ukraine tasked with transport, escort, protection of public order and Ukrainian territorial integrity. It was established in 1992 and is garrisoned in Zhytomyr. Its units are stationed in Zhytomyr, Berdychiv, Korosten and Demchyn.

== History ==
It was established on 10 February 1992, on the basis of two line battalions of the 7th Convoy Brigade stationed in Zhytomyr and Berdychev respectively and was headquartered at Zhytomyr. Major Tashkevich Mykola Andriyovych was appointed as its commander. In 1992 it was composed of 9 companies and 2 separate platoons of around a thousand personnel. It guarded 4 prisons in the Zhytomyr Oblast, supervised convicts in prisons and LTP, escorted people to the proceedings of regional courts and military court of the Zhytomyr garrison, field sessions and guarded stations in Zhytomyr, Berdychiv, Korosten, Demchyn. In October 1992 and August 1993, the rifle companies in the Raiky and Berdychev were reduced and guardian companies were established. In April 1997, the prison guard units were transferred to the State Department of Ukraine for Execution of Sentences followed by guardian companies in December 1998 and protection of correctional labor institutions divisions to the State Department of Penitentiary of Ukraine in September 1999. In October 1999, the patrol company was reformed into a law enforcement company. It was transferred to the Internal Troops of Ukraine. In 2001, a special patrol company was inducted followed by the induction of a military construction company and an automobile platoon in 2003. In 2001, the battalion was awarded the Transitional Cup of the head of the Northern Territorial Command for high performance in combat service, combat and special training, strengthening of military discipline. On 16 May 2020, a new patrol unit was also created for the battalion.

34 personnel of the Battalion are deployed for law enforcement daily.

The battalion saw action in the ATO zone during the War in Donbass and also maintained public order in Kyiv and Olevsk in 2016 and launched a crackdown on illegal amber mining.

Following the Russian invasion of Ukraine in 2022, the battalion saw combat during the war defending Ukraine. On 28 June 2023, an airstrike interrupted the statehood day celebrations in Berdychiv at a location where the personnel of the Battalion were present.

== Structure ==
The structure of the battalion is as follows:

- Rifle Company
- 1st Patrol Company
- 2nd Patrol Company
- Special Purpose Patrol Company
- Automobile Company
- Military Construction Company
- Guardian Platoon

== Commanders ==
- Lieutenant Colonel Mykola Tashkevich (10 February 1992 – 24 October 2017)
- Colonel Oleksiy Melnyk (24 October 2017-)

== Sources ==
- Техніка, озброєння, показові виступи і «солдатська» каша – житомирські нацгвардійці провели день відкритих дверей.
- У Житомирі бійці спецгрупи продемонстрували майстерність рукопашного бою.
- Житомирська військова частина внутрішніх військ відзначає 21-річницю з дня створення
- Житомирська військова частина відчинила свої двері для всіх бажаючих
- Внутрішні війська провели день відкритих дверей
