= National Guard of Ukraine =

Internal troops and militarised police force of Ukraine

National Guard of Ukraine Національна гвардія України
- Patch of the National Guard

- Emblem of the National Guard

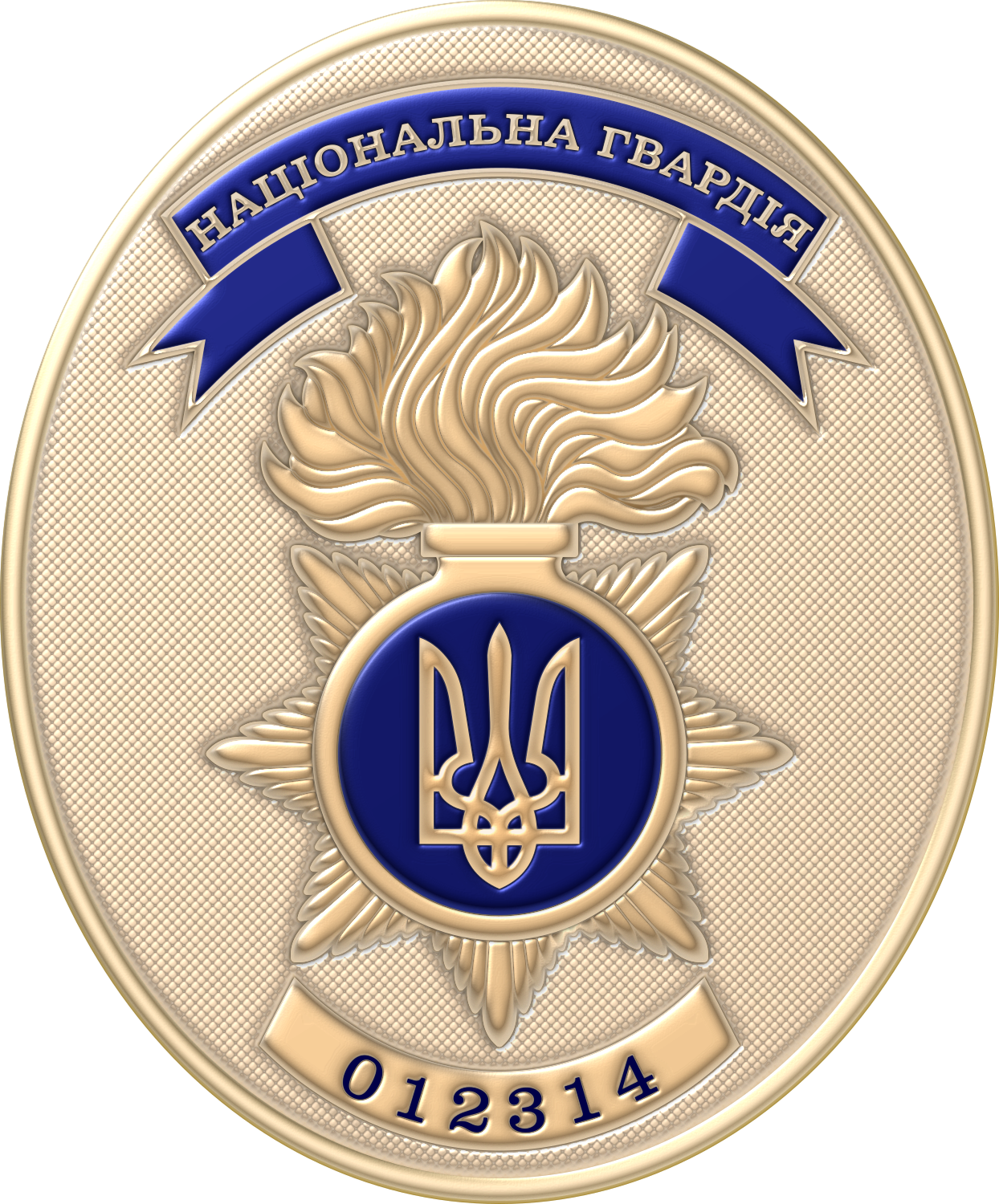
- Badge of the National Guard

- Ensign
- Abbreviation: NGU, NHU
- Motto: Честь, Мужність, Закон; Honor, Courage, Law

Agency overview
- Formed: 4 November 1991 (original form); 13 March 2014 (re-established)
- Preceding agency: Internal Troops of Ukraine
- Employees: 60,000 (2022); ~90,000 (2022)

Jurisdictional structure
- Operations jurisdiction: Ukraine
- Constituting instrument: Law on the National Guard of Ukraine, 2014
- General nature: Gendarmerie

Operational structure
- Headquarters: Kyiv
- Agency executive: General Oleksandr Pivnenko, Commander
- Parent agency: Ministry of Internal Affairs

Notables
- Significant operations: Transnistria conflict spillover; 1992–94 Crimean crisis; 2014 pro-Russian unrest in Ukraine; War in Donbas; Russo-Ukrainian war (2022–present)
- Anniversary: 26 March

Website
- ngu.gov.ua/en

The National Guard of Ukraine (NGU; Ukrainian: Національна гвардія України, romanized: Natsionalna hvardiia Ukrainy, IPA: [nɐts⁽ʲ⁾ioˈnɑlʲnɐ ˈɦwɑrd⁽ʲ⁾ijɐ ʊkrɐˈjinɪ]; abbr. НГУ/NHU [ˌɛnɦeˈu]) is the national gendarmerie and internal troops of Ukraine. It is part of the Ministry of Internal Affairs, responsible for public security. Originally created as an agency under the direct control of the Verkhovna Rada on 4 November 1991, following Ukrainian independence, it was later disbanded and merged into the Internal Troops of Ukraine in 2000 by President Leonid Kuchma as part of a "cost-saving" scheme. Following the 2014 Revolution of Dignity, amidst the Russian intervention, the National Guard was re-established, and the Internal Troops were disbanded.

The purpose of the National Guard is to serve as a military unit with law enforcement powers. Its mission is to ensure state security, protect state borders (supporting the State Border Service), participate in activities to neutralize paramilitary armed groups, terrorist organizations, gangs and criminal organizations, protect critical infrastructure such as Ukraine's nuclear power plants, diplomatic missions, and buildings of the Ministry of Internal Affairs. The NGU has sent personnel to UN peacekeeping missions. During peacetime the National Guard focuses on civilian public security, combating organized crime, and controlling civil unrest. During wartime the National Guard can be mobilized as a regular military force and take part in combat operations alongside the Armed Forces of Ukraine, which it has done during the war in Donbas and the 2022 Russian invasion of Ukraine.

== History ==
=== Original formation ===
The National Guard of Ukraine was originally created by the Law of Ukraine "On the National Guard of Ukraine" dated 4 November 1991, No. 1775 -XII. It was created on the basis of part of the Internal Troops of the Soviet Union in the Ukrainian SSR, while the Internal Troops of Ukraine also was established at almost the same time in 1992 as parts of the Ukrainian branch of the old Soviet Internal Troops. The National Guard claimed to inherit the traditions and legacy of the Gendarmerie of the Ukrainian People's Republic, which existed from 1918 to 1919.

During its early existence, the National Guard was indirectly involved in the Transnistria War of the Transnistria conflict during the spring and summer of 1992, helping to defend the border against a threatened spill-over of the conflict into Ukraine. Formations involved were the 3rd, 4th and 5th divisions NGU (equipment transferred from the 93rd Motorized Rifle Division was also used in this deployment). Afterwards, up until 1998, National Guard units backed up the border guards in anti-smuggling operations conducted on the border with Moldova and Moldova's breakaway Transnistria region. In 1994, the National Guard was also involved in the 1992–1994 Crimean Crisis, which was an attempt by the Autonomous Republic of Crimea to declare itself sovereign after the 1991 Crimean sovereignty referendum. The National Guard was sent to restore order and Ukrainian sovereignty over Crimea.

In 1995, there were calls for the dissolution of the National Guard by political opponents of President Leonid Kuchma, who accused him of dictatorial behavior after he resubordinated the guard to himself by decree. After Kuchma's re-election after the 1999 Ukrainian presidential election, the opposition continued to demand the extinction of the National Guard, which was done in 2000 as part of a concession to the opposition by Kuchma and justified as part of a "cost-saving scheme".

The National Guard was dissolved by the Law of Ukraine "On Amendments and Additions to Certain Legislative Acts of Ukraine" dated 11 January 2000, and merged with the Internal Troops of Ukraine, while some NGU formations were reassigned to the Armed Forces of Ukraine and thus were included in the order of battle of the Ukrainian Ground Forces.

=== Badges of the NGU 1991–2000 ===
Badge of NGU
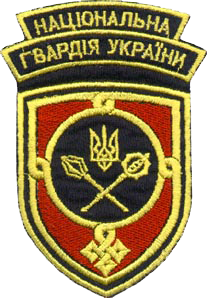
Headquarters

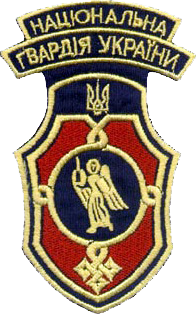
1st Kyiv division

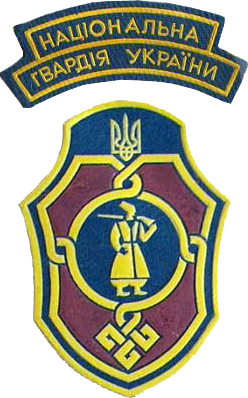
2nd Eastern division

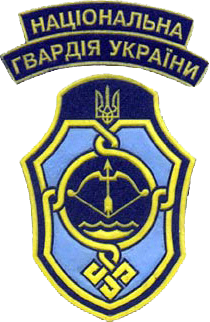
3rd Southern division

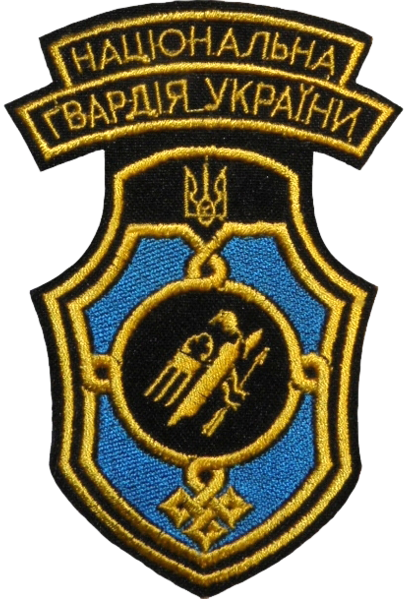
4th Northern division

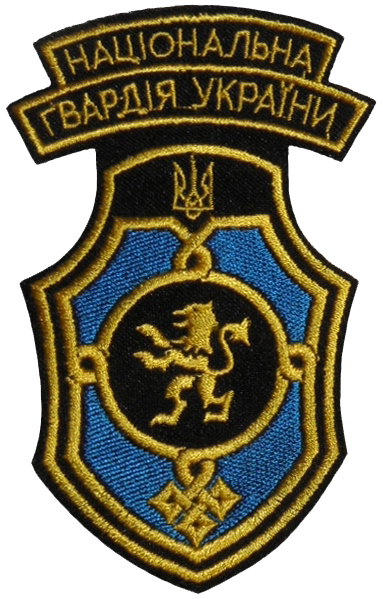
5th Western division

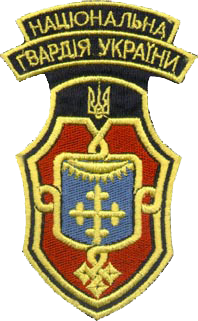
6th Eastern division

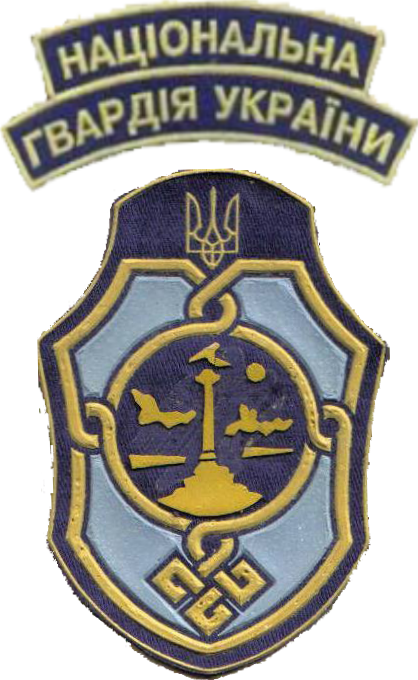
7th Crimea division

=== Reformation ===
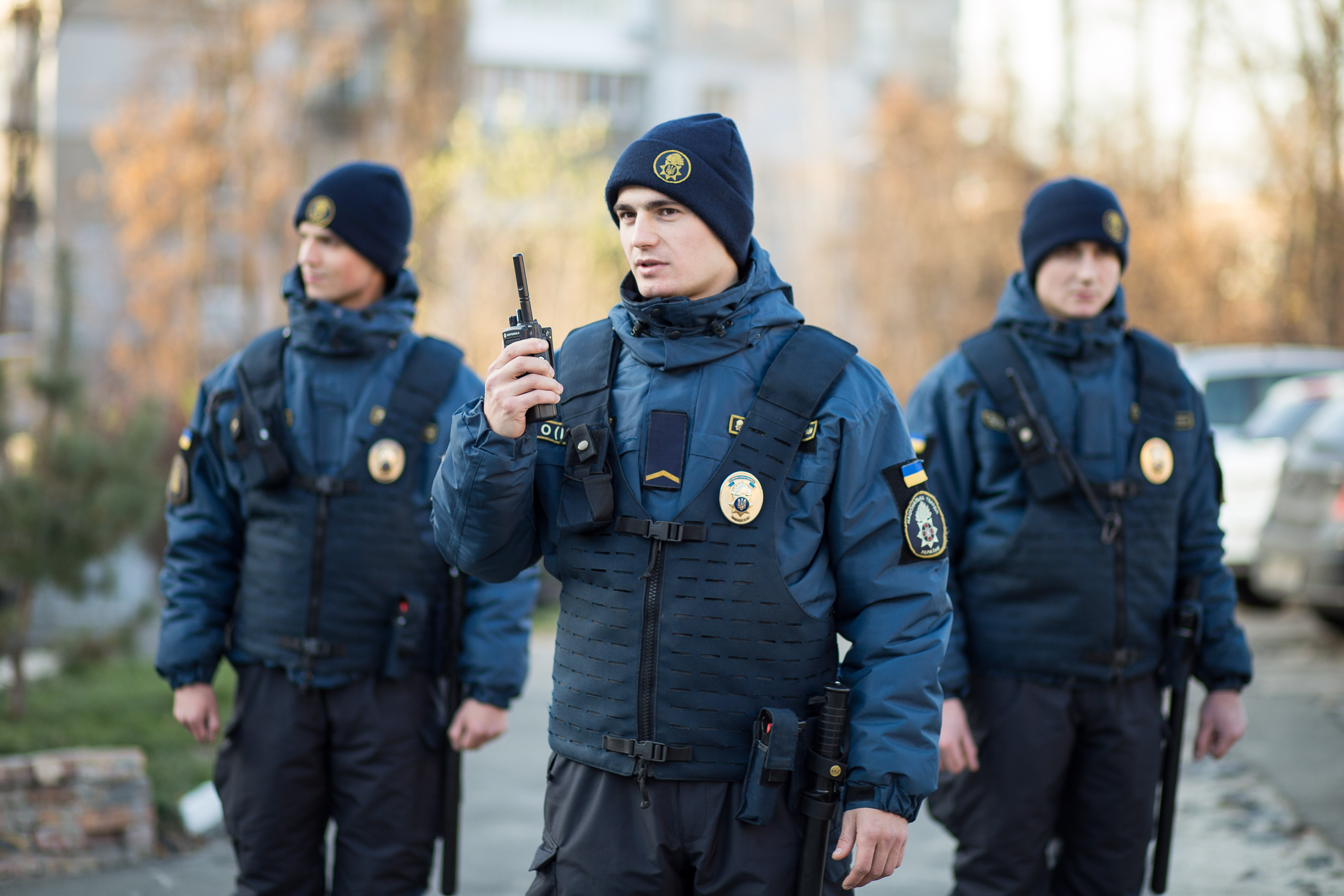
National Guardsman in patrol uniforms

In 2014, amidst Russian intervention to Crimea, the reformed force was created partially on the basis of the Internal Troops of Ukraine, with plans for the "Volunteer Battalions", militias and armed wings from certain of Ukraine's political parties and organisations, including the Euromaidan movement, to be also incorporated into it. Direct recruitment from military academies was also intended. The National Guard was recreated in accordance with the Law of Ukraine "On the National Guard of Ukraine" [Law number 4393] dated 12 March 2014, (the draft legislation being originally introduced to the Ukrainian parliament on 11 March). A previous attempt by then President Yushchenko to bring back the National Guard during civil unrest in 2008 had been blocked in the Rada. It was finally re-established in March 2014 after the beginning of the annexation of Crimea by the Russian Federation. On 16 March, the Yatsenyuk Government announced plans to recruit 10,000 people within the next 15 days for the by now revived National Guard. Individual volunteers were also accepted.

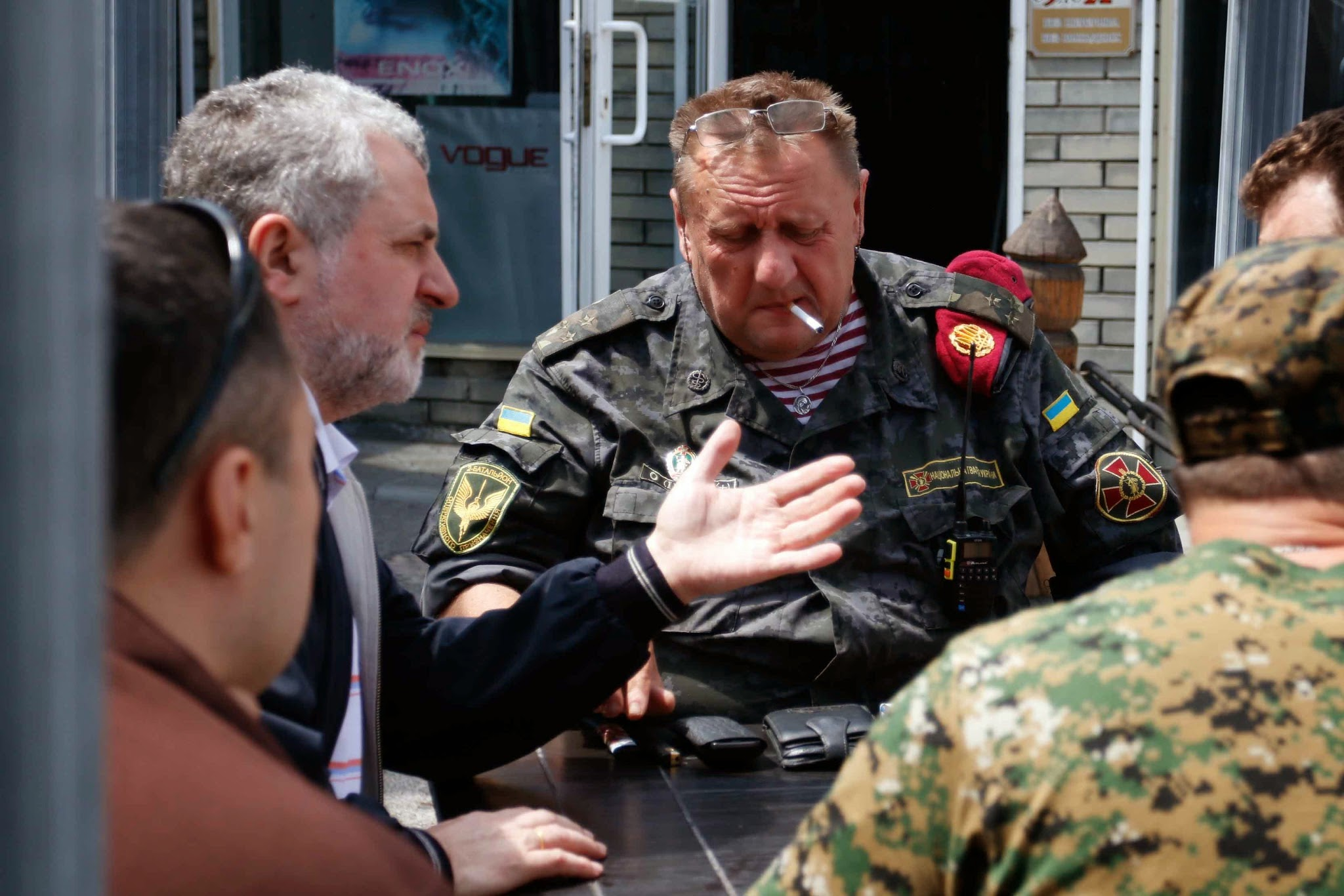
National Guard officer in the aftermath of the Siege of Sloviansk, July 9 2014

The 2014 law provided for an initial authorised strength of 33,000 personnel. It also tasks the National Guard with maintaining public order, protecting sites like nuclear power plants and "upholding the constitutional order and restoring the activity of state bodies", in part a reference to the situation in Crimea, as well as to the perceived Russian threat to Ukraine as a whole. In the eastern parts of the country in particular, not only will the National Guard reinforce regular military units defending against a feared Russian invasion, it will also be expected to uphold Part 1 of Art. 109 of the Criminal Code of Ukraine (Note: "Actions aimed at the violent overthrow, change of constitutional order, or the seizure of state power") (i.e. it is intended to act as a counterinsurgency force against fifth columnists and infiltrators).

The National Guard will be receiving a large proportion of the money from the emergency budgetary reprogramming approved by parliament for the funding of weapons procurement, equipment repair, and training (said reprogramming is equivalent to $600 million in 2014 Dollars). It is hoped that, eventually, the strength of the National Guard will rise to 60,000 personnel. The pay for National Guard regulars is approximately 214 Euros ($297) a month, equivalent to an average Ukrainian's monthly income. Officers receive about twice that amount. There are also some attached Internal Troops personnel, mostly for training and/or logistical support purposes, e.g. K-9 teams that have been taking part in training and demonstration sessions.

During the ongoing war in the Donbas region of Ukraine, the forces of the revived National Guard have fought against pro-Russian separatists and Russian troops disguised as separatists. Due to lack of reserves, earlier in the conflict willing civilians and political groups created their own militias and paramilitary groups, known as the "Volunteer Battalions", to fight the separatists on their own. The Battalions were credited to have held the line against the separatists and allowed the National Guard and the Armed Forces to reorganize and strike back. Some of the Battalions were placed under the aegis of the Ministry of Internal Affairs Two of them were the Azov and Donbas battalions, which were the largest volunteer units by far with a strength of 1,000 and 900 soldiers. Due to the size and operational success of those Battalions, they were transferred to be under the command of the National Guard.

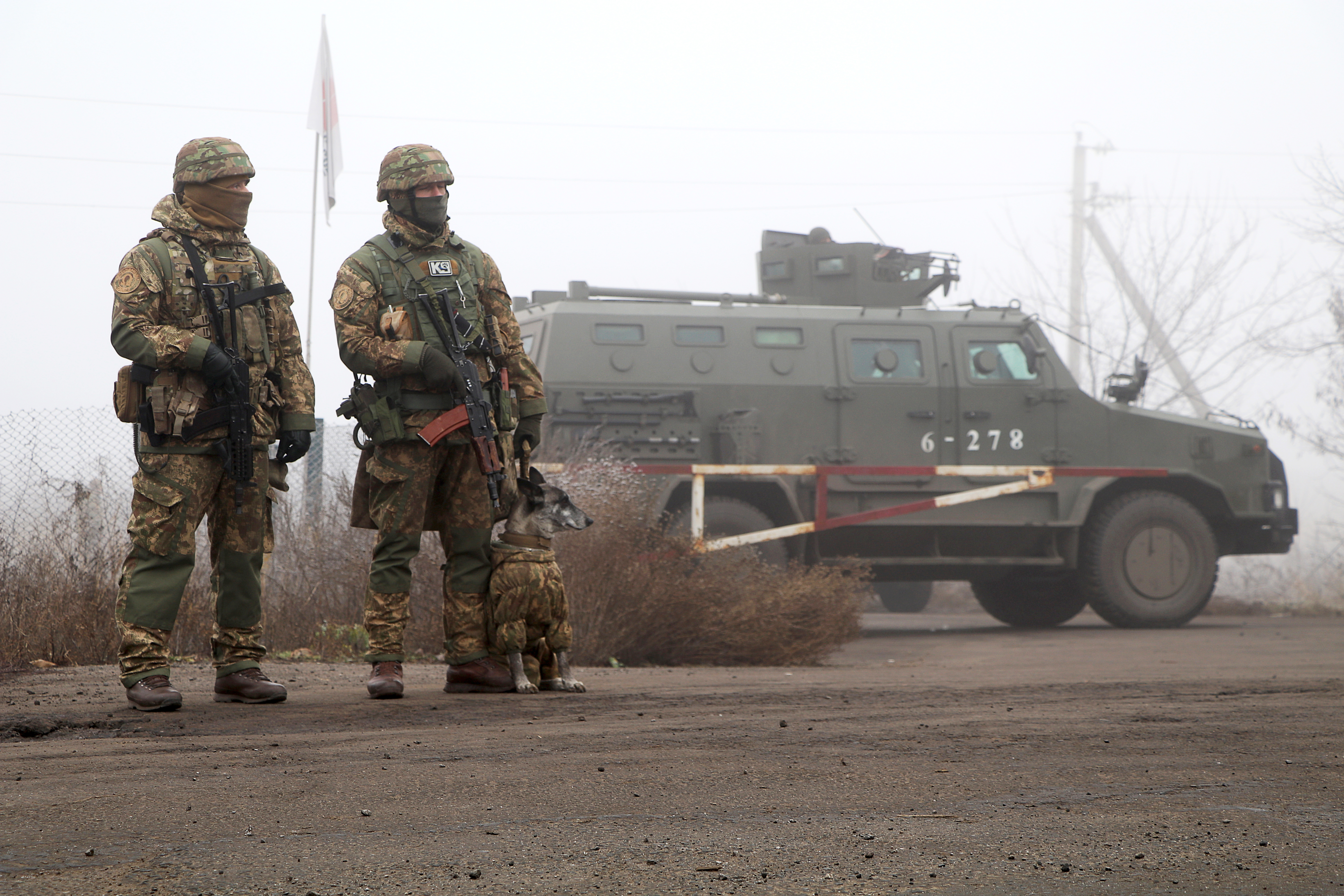
National Guard K-9 unit at the JFO zone, 2019.

In May, the National Guard saw one of its first combat operations at the First Battle of Mariupol, where they clashed with pro-Russia militants and demonstrators during the unrest in Mariupol. They first attempted to occupy several government buildings before they were routed by National Guard riot troops, but soon the unrest evolved into heavy fighting between government and separatist militia forces. Around the same time on May, separatist troops captured the terminal buildings of Donetsk International Airport, the National Guard circled the separatist forces, issuing an ultimatum demanding the surrender of the separatists — which was denied — and the paratroopers launched an assault on the airport. The incident became known as the First Battle of Donetsk Airport. On the same month, National Guard Major General Serhiy Kulchytsky was killed during the Siege of Sloviansk, when his helicopter was shot down by separatists. On early June, a Border Guard base and a National Guard were besieged in Luhansk and after 10 hours of battle the base fell after the guardsmen ran out of ammunition.

On October 13, several National Guards troops protested outside the Ukrainian presidential administration building in Kyiv, they demanded the end of conscription and their own demobilisation. According to Kyiv Post, many of the protesters were former Internal Troops who had clashed with Euromaidan protesters, and they were not in favour of that movement or the new government.

Three National Guardsmen died in a riot on 31 August 2015 at the Verkhovna Rada when a policeman on leave threw a grenade outside the facade.

According to official figures, by mid-April 2016, the Interior Ministry and the National Guard have lost 308 personnel since the war in Donbas broke out, including 108 from the National Guard's volunteer battalions.

=== Russo-Ukrainian War ===
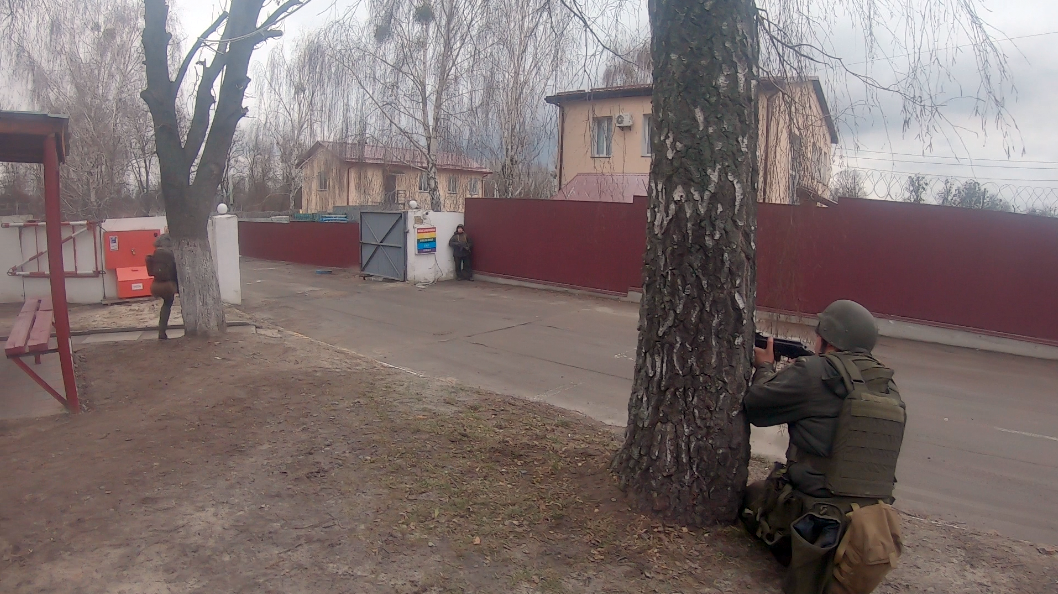
4th Rapid Reaction Brigade soldiers during the Battle of Hostomel Airport

Beginning Thursday, 24 February 2022, the day the Russian Armed Forces invaded Ukraine, the NGU has been active in many of the land battles fought by Ukrainian forces during the current war.

On the first day of the war, the Russian Airborne Forces (VDV) attempted an air assault on the Antonov Airport in Hostomel, northwest Kyiv, in order to do an air lift and bring more troops and heavier equipment to the capital in a military engagement that became known as the Battle of Antonov Airport. In the initial phases of the assault, the VDV expelled a small garrison of the National Guard and took control of the airport. However, the 4th Rapid Reaction Brigade of the Ukrainian National Guard swiftly reacted by launching an extensive counter-attack, using armored vehicles and artillery, that encircling the unsupported Russian troops and repelled the attack. The airport was captured by a renewed Russian offensive the next day, but the airport was rendered unusable by battle damage. The actions of the 4th Brigade were credited with preventing the quick capitulation of Kyiv, and led to the Russian offensive on Kyiv stalling and eventually withdrawing.

169 National Guard troops were captured after the battle of Chernobyl. Russian Ministry of Foreign Affairs claimed that "Currently, control over the situation at the Chernobyl NPP is being exercised jointly by Russian servicemen, Ukrainian specialists, the plant's civilian personnel, and that country's National Guard". But later reports indicated they were captured and locked in a bunker for 30 days. On 6 April, the Ukrainians officially announced the National Guard had retaken and reestablished control over the Chernobyl Nuclear Power Plant.

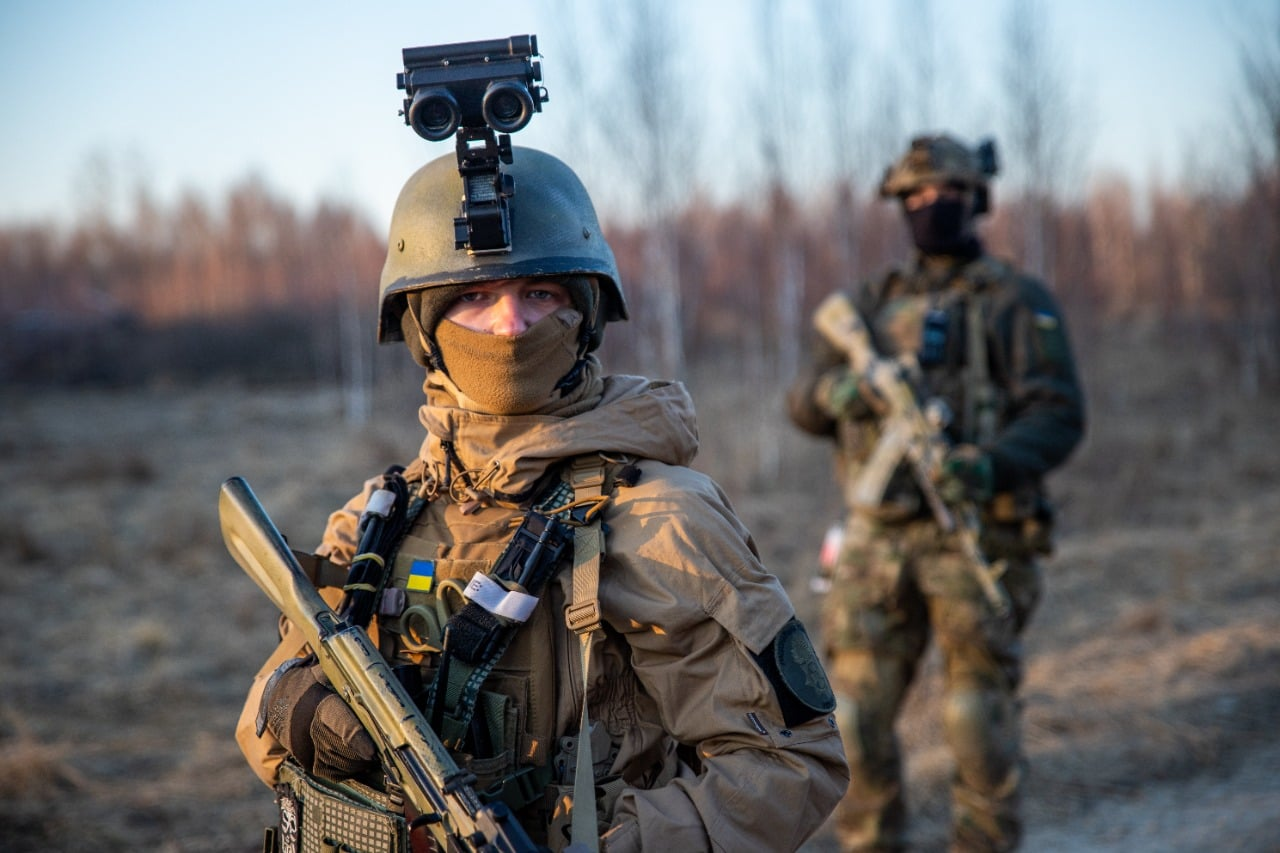
Soldiers of the National Guard of Ukraine in 2022.

The Azov Regiment was heavily involved in the Siege of Mariupol, being one of the primary defenders of the city. The other units of the National Guard defending the city were the 23rd Separate Protection of Public Order Brigade and the 12th Operational Brigade. The Azov's origins as a neonazi and ultranationalist militia, and its legitimization by the Ukrainian government and inclusion in the official structure of the National Guard has been a point of contention. It has been used by Russia to paint the Ukrainian government as Nazi-leaning, as justification for the brutality in Mariupol and as a casus belli for the invasion itself.

After the retreat of Russian forces from the Kyiv axis, the 4th Rapid Reaction Brigade was redeployed to Eastern Ukraine, to fight on the eastern front of the war. In the east, unit was involved at the Battle of Severodonetsk and Lysychansk, where they fought a month-long defense of the twin cities. And later in the year, the unit was deployed at Bakhmut to fight in the grueling Battle of Bakhmut.

The National Guard began the raising of an additional 6 "Offensive Guard" Infantry Brigades in February 2023 to bolster its fighting forces under the recommendation of the Ministry of Internal Affairs, with the remaining two under other agencies. These brigades, unlike those under Army wartime control, report directly to NGU General Headquarters in Kyiv through operational commanders. Under these circumstances, and with most of the former Azov Regiment veterans of Mariupol (by now released if living) and other battles now reporting under the Armed Forces' overall command, the regiment was reflagged and reactivated, this time, as a National Guard Offensive Infantry Brigade, organized in like manner as the rest of its fellow brigades. Its success resulted in the raising of two NGU Corps-level commands in 2025 to better coordinate its military operations.

== Structure ==
The National Guard of Ukraine is a military force under the command of Ukrainian Ministry of Internal Affairs, and is tasked to protect public order, strategically important facilities and counter illegal paramilitary groups. Originally formed in 1991, in 2000 the National Guard was disbanded due to financial issues, then restored in 2014 after the Maidan revolution on the basis of the former Internal Troops of Ukraine, which formerly co-existed with the first iteration of the NGU. During martial law periods, the units of National Guard are subordinated to the Armed Forces of Ukraine.

As of 2023 the National Guard is structured in five Operational-Territorial Commands:

- Central Command, Dnipro, Dnipro Oblast
- Eastern Command, Kharkiv, Kharkiv Oblast
- Northern Command, Kyiv, Kyiv Oblast
- Southern Command, Odesa, Odesa Oblast
- Western Command, Lviv, Lviv Oblast

=== Directly reporting formations under GHQ National Guard ===
- National Guard Headquarters Protection & Support Battalion
- 22nd Diplomatic Missions & Consular Posts of Foreign States Protection Brigade
- Ukrainian Air National Guard
- Military Band Service of the National Guard of Ukraine
- National Guard Signals Center

=== Volunteer units ===
- Kruk Battalion, Ivano-Frankivsk, Ivano-frankivsk Oblast
- Kulchitskyi Battalion, Kyiv, Kyiv Oblast
- Dnipro-1 Regiment, Dnipro, Dnipro Oblast

=== Operational brigades ===
- 1st "Burevii" Brigade (Petro Doroshenko), Vyshorod, Kyiv Oblast
  - 1st Operational Battalion “Forpost”
  - 2nd Operational Battalion “Irbis”
  - 3rd Operational Battalion “Hroza”
  - 4th Operational Battalion “Khoryv”
  - Field Artillery Battalion
  - Anti-Aircraft Defense Battalion
- 3rd "Spartan" Brigade (Petro Bolbochan), Kharkiv, Kharkiv Oblast
  - 1st Infantry Battalion
  - 2nd Infantry Battalion
  - 3rd Infantry Battalion
  - 4th Guardsmen Battalion
  - Tank Company
  - Artillery Battalion
  - Anti-Aircraft Defense Battalion
  - Reconnaissance Company
- 4th "Rubizh" Brigade (Serhii Mikhalchuk), Hostomel, Kyiv Oblast
  - HHC
  - 1st Infantry Battalion
  - 2nd Infantry Battalion
  - 3rd "Svoboda" Infantry Battalion
  - 4th Infantry Battalion
  - 5th Infantry Battalion
  - 6th Infantry Battalion
  - Tank Battalion
  - Field Artillery Regiment
  - Anti-Aircraft Defense Battalion
  - Reconnaissance Company
- 12th "Azov" Brigade (formerly 12th Operational Brigade), Yurivka, Donetsk Oblast
  - Brigade HHC
  - 1st Infantry Battalion
  - 2nd Infantry Battalion
  - 3rd Guardsmen Battalion
  - Tank Company
  - Artillery Battalion
  - Anti-Aircraft Defense Battalion
  - Reconnaissance Company
- 13th Khartiia Brigade, Kharkiv Oblast
- 14th Chervona Kalyna Brigade (Ivan Bohun), Kalynivka, Vinnytsia Oblast
- 15th "Kara-Dag" Brigade (Bohdan Zavada), Zaporizhzhia, Zaporizhzhia Oblast
  - 1st Infantry Battalion
  - 2nd Infantry Battalion
  - 3rd Guardsmen Battalion
  - Tank Company
  - Artillery Battalion
  - Anti-Aircraft Defense Battalion
  - Reconnaissance Company
- 16th Artillery Brigade, Dnipro, Dnipro Oblast
- 20th Operational Brigade “Lubart”, Lutsk, Volyn Oblast
- 45th Operational Regiment, Lviv, Lviv Oblast
- Special Operations Center "Omega"
- Special Purpose Unit "Typhoon"

=== Protection of public order ===
- 11th Hrushevsky Brigade, Odesa, Odesa Oblast
  - 18th Public Protection Battalion, Izmail, Odesa Oblast
- 19th Public Protection Regiment, Mykolaiv, Mykolaiv Oblast
- 21st Kalnyshevsky Brigade, Kropyvnytskyi and Kryvyi Rih
- 23rd Khortytsia Brigade, Zaporizhzhia, Melitopol, Berdyansk and Energodar
- 25th Prince Askold Brigade, Kyiv, Kyiv Oblast
  - Special Honor Guard Battalion
- 31st Major General Oleksandr Radievskyi Brigade, Dnipro, Dnipropetrovsk Oblast
- 37th Public Order Brigade, Kremenchuk, Poltava Oblast

=== Mixed units ===
- 2nd Galician Brigade
  - 15th National Guard Battalion
- 5th Slobozhansk Brigade
- 17th Poltavska Brigade
- 18th Sloviansk Brigade
  - 2nd Donbas Battalion
- 26th National Guard Battalion
- 27th National Guard Regiment
- 31st Cherkasy Regiment
- 32nd Volyn Battalion
- 34th Kherson Regiment
- 35th Sumysky Regiment
- 40th Danylo Nechai Regiment
  - 13th National Guard Battalion
- 50th Vysochan Regiment
  - 4th Kruk Battalion
- 75th Zhytomyr Battalion

=== Transport protection units ===
- 14th Separate Battalion
- 19th Separate Battalion
- 27th Pechersk Brigade
- 34th Separate Battalion

=== State Objects Protection units ===
- 1st Facilities Protection Regiment
- 2nd Facilities Protection Regiment
- 4th Facilities Protection Regiment

=== Nuclear Power Plant Guards ===
- 28th Facilities Protection Regiment
- 29th Facilities Protection Regiment
- 30th Facilities Protection Regiment
- 33rd Facilities Protection Regiment

== Commanders ==
- 1991–1995: Lieutenant General Volodymyr Kukharets
- 1995–1996: Lieutenant General Oleksandr Kuzmuk
- 1996–1998: Lieutenant General Ihor Valkiv
- 1998–2000: Lieutenant General Oleksandr Chapovsky
- 2000–2014: transferred to the Commander of Internal Troops
- 2014 Lieutenant General Stepan Poltorak
- 2014–2015: Lieutenant General Mykola Balan (acting)
- 2015–2019: Colonel General Yurii Allerov
- 2019–2022: Lieutenant General Mykola Balan
- 2022–2023: Lieutenant General Yuriy Lebid
- 2023–present: Brigadier General Oleksandr Pivnenko

== Training ==
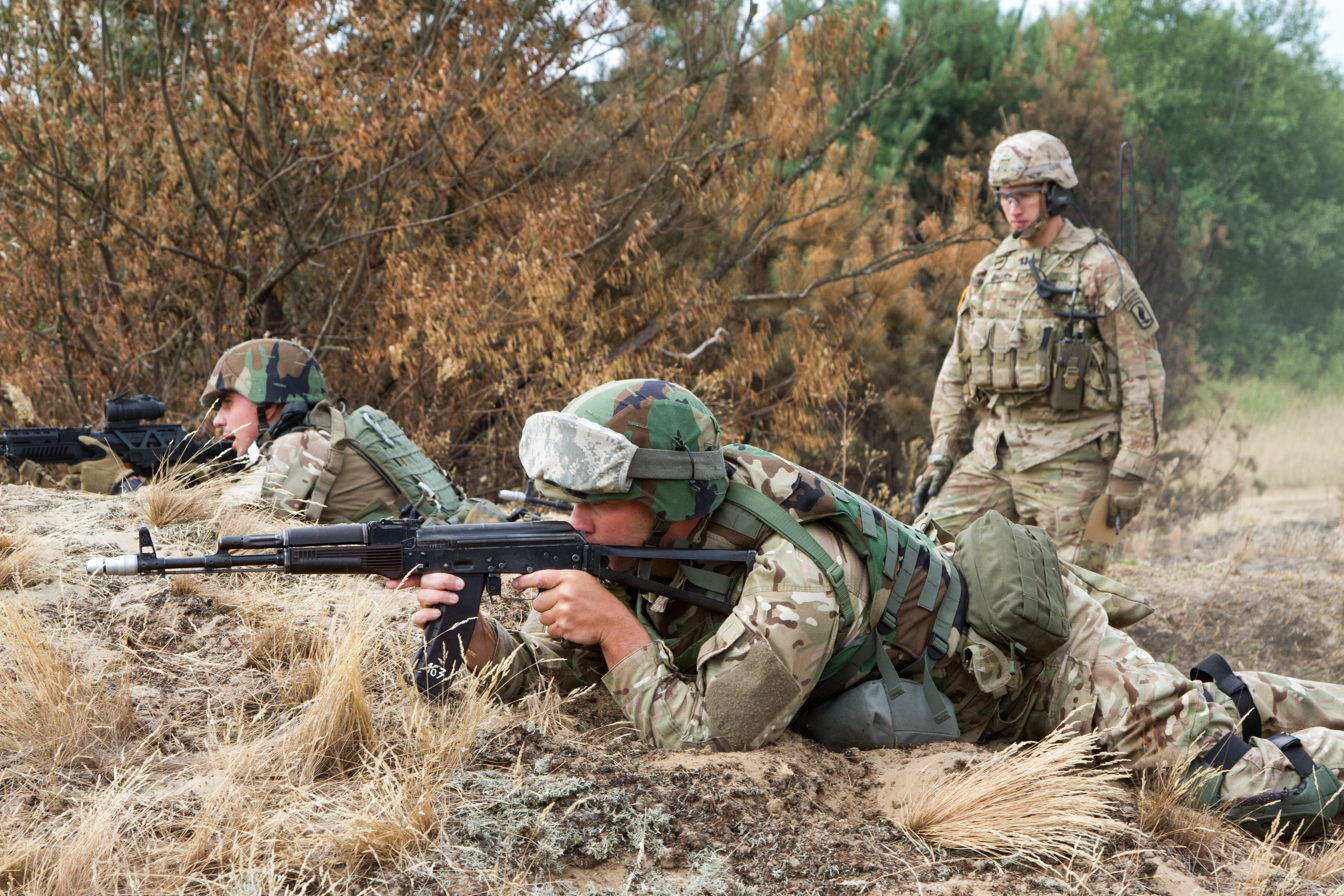
National Guard soldiers (lower left) fire at targets while being trained by soldiers (upper right) of the US Army

New recruits (those not transferring in from the Internal Troops, Ground Forces or military academies) will undergo an initial two-week compressed training course, covering a range of areas from firearms and unarmed combat, to map reading and communications. Those signing up to be full-time members of the Guard will receive at least an additional four weeks of training. (Note: However, at least one regular battalion has been stood up with only three weeks total of training.[Early April 2014]) For those part-time members who complete their two-week training and return to their communities to await call-up, the authorities appear to be planning to implement a variation of the March battalion system; based where possible around existing civilian militias and armed groupings. Most of those use the sotnya as their basic unit, as does the National Guard itself.

In March 2015, the National Guard of Ukraine received training from the U.S. 173rd Airborne Brigade Combat Team. The training took place at the Yavoriv training center near the western Ukrainian city of Lviv. The 173rd Airborne paratroopers trained the Ukrainians on how to better defend themselves against "Russian and rebel artillery and rockets." Training also included securing roads, bridges, and other infrastructure and treating and evacuating casualties.

Officers and NCOs of the NGU are trained under the aegis of the National Guard Military Academy of Ukraine.

== Ranks and insignia ==
Officers

Rank group	General / flag officers				Senior officers			Junior officers
National Guard of Ukraine
National Guard of Ukraine	Генерал; Heneral	Генерал-лейтенант; Heneral-leitenant	Генерал-майор; Heneral-maior	Бригадний генерал Bryhadnyi heneral	Полковник; Polkovnyk	Підполковник; Pidpolkovnyk	Майор; Maior	Капітан; Kapitan	Старший лейтенант Starshyi leitenant	Лейтенант; Leitenant	Молодший лейтенант Molodshyi leitenant

Other Ranks and NCOs

Rank group	Senior NCOs						Junior NCOs		Enlisted
National Guard of Ukraine
National Guard of Ukraine	Головний майстер-сержант Holovnyi maister-serzhant	Старший майстер-сержант Starshyi maister-serzhant	Майстер-сержант; Maister-serzhant	Штаб-сержант; Shtab-serzhant	Головний сержант Holovnyi serzhant	Старший сержант Starshyi serzhant	Сержант; Serzhant	Молодший сержант Molodshyi serzhant	Старший солдат Starshyi soldat	Солдат; Soldat

=== Long Service Medal ===
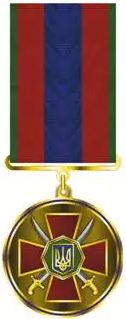
25 years in service

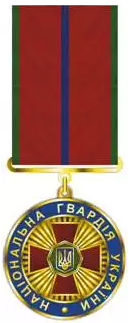
20 years in service

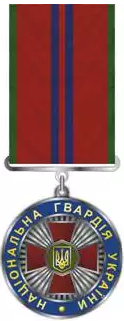
15 years in service

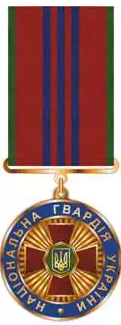
10 years in service

== Gallery ==
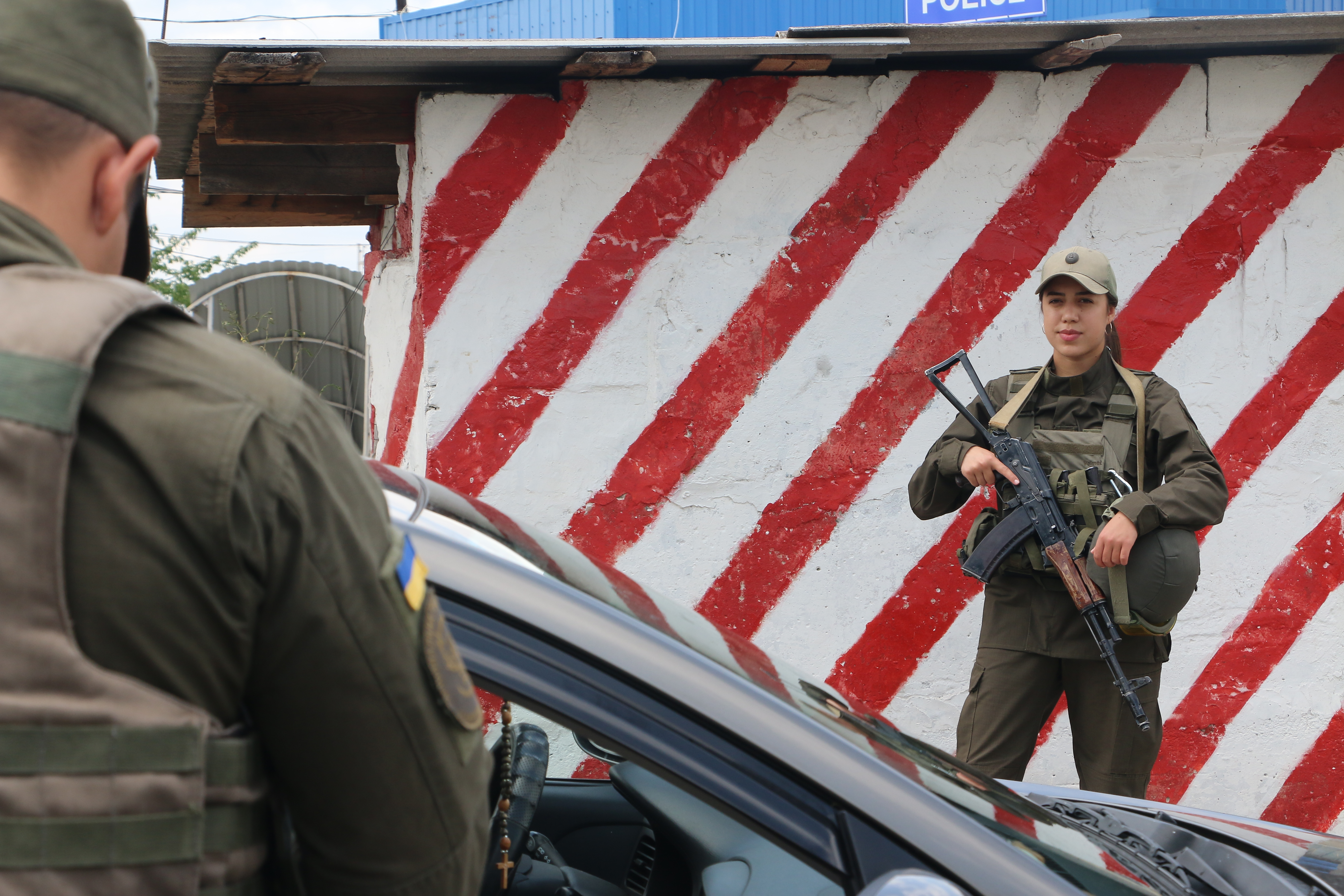
Female soldier of the NGU at a security checkpoint

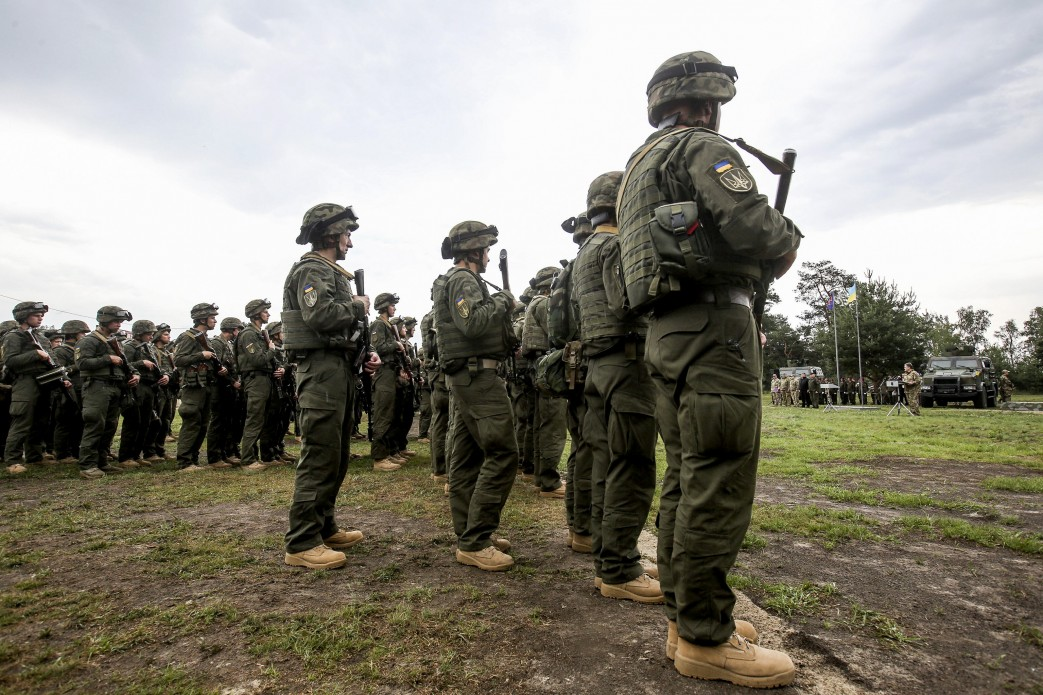
4th Rapid Reaction Brigade members in 2016

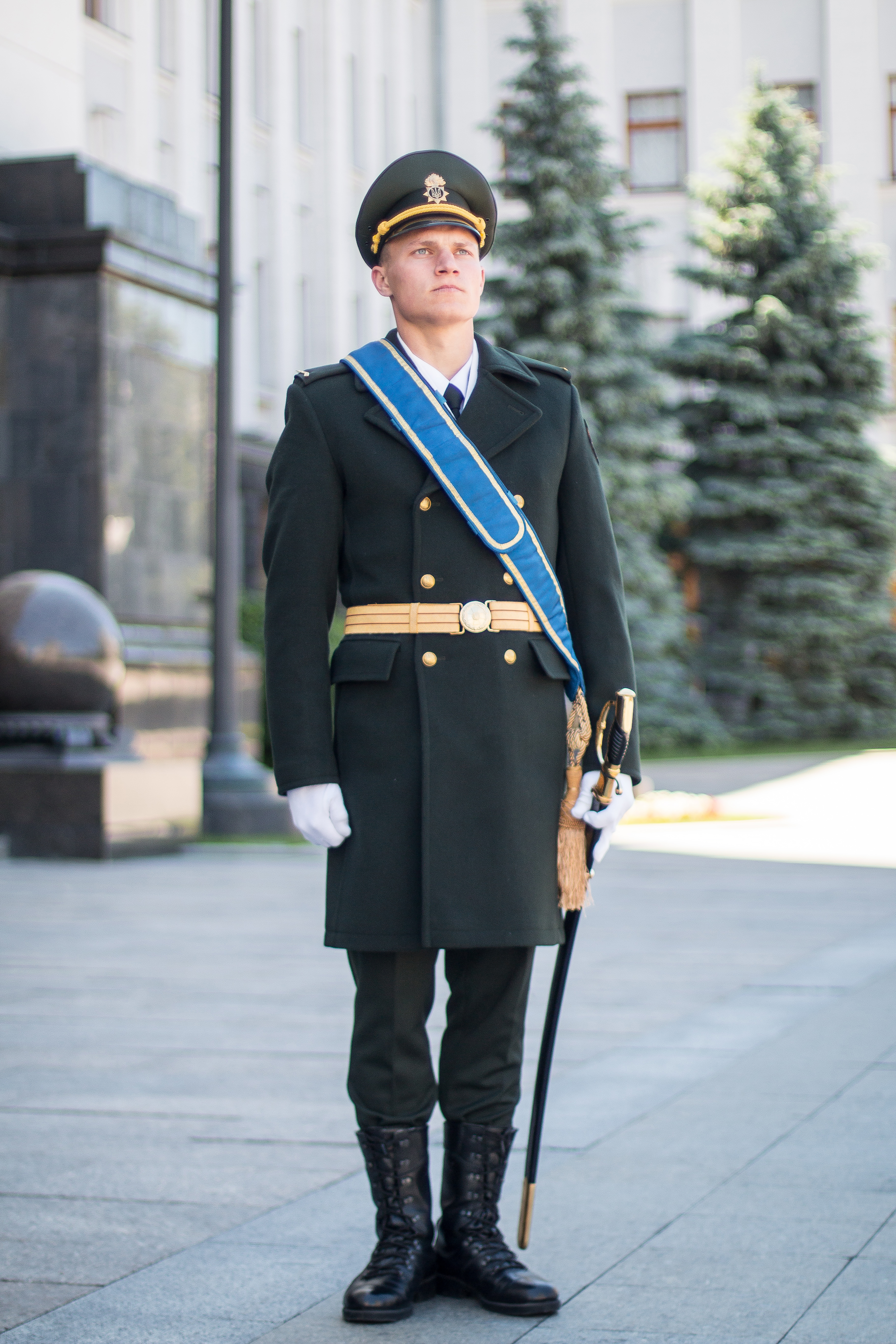
Member of the Special Honor Guard of the National Guard of Ukraine

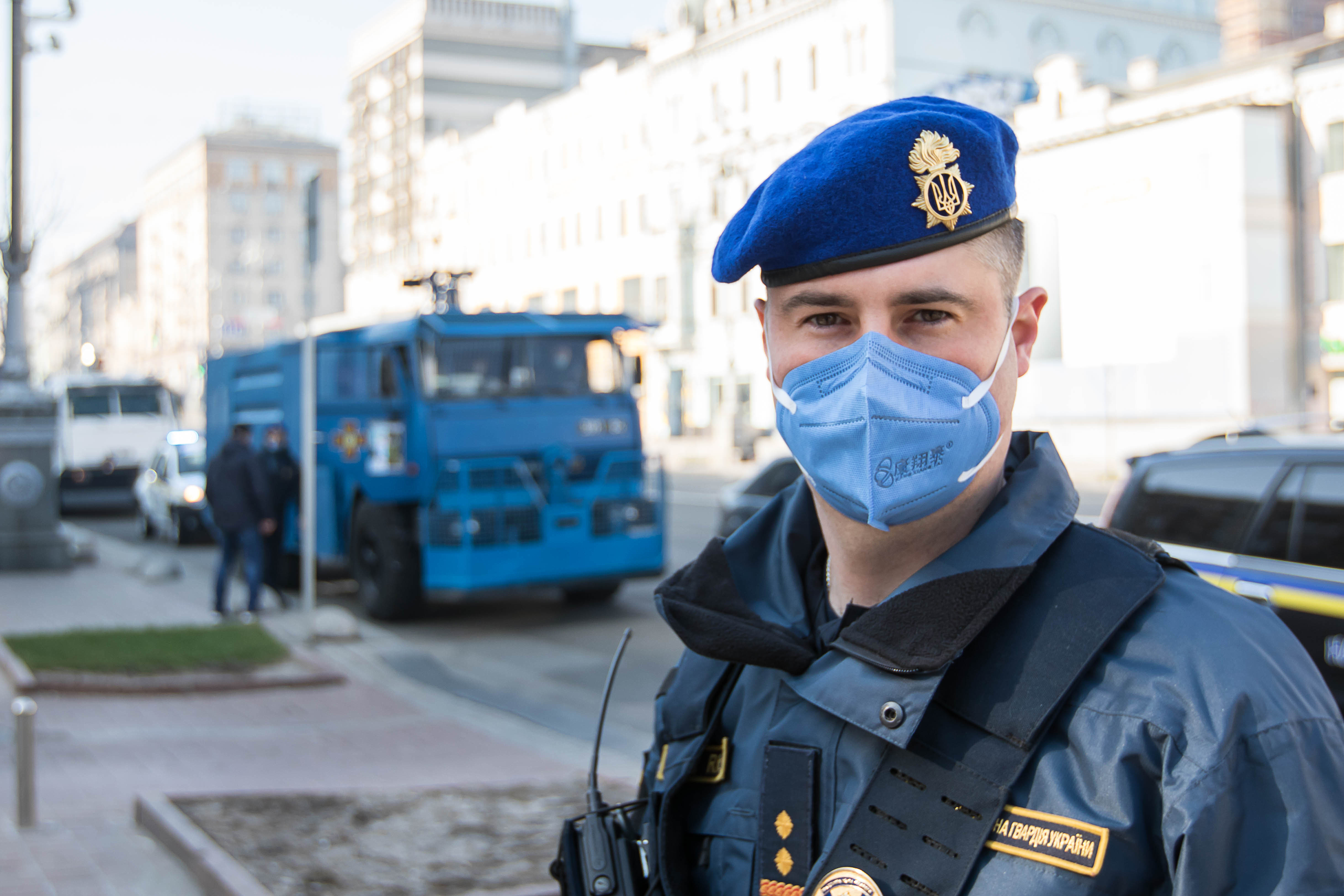
National Guardsman during the COVID-19 pandemic

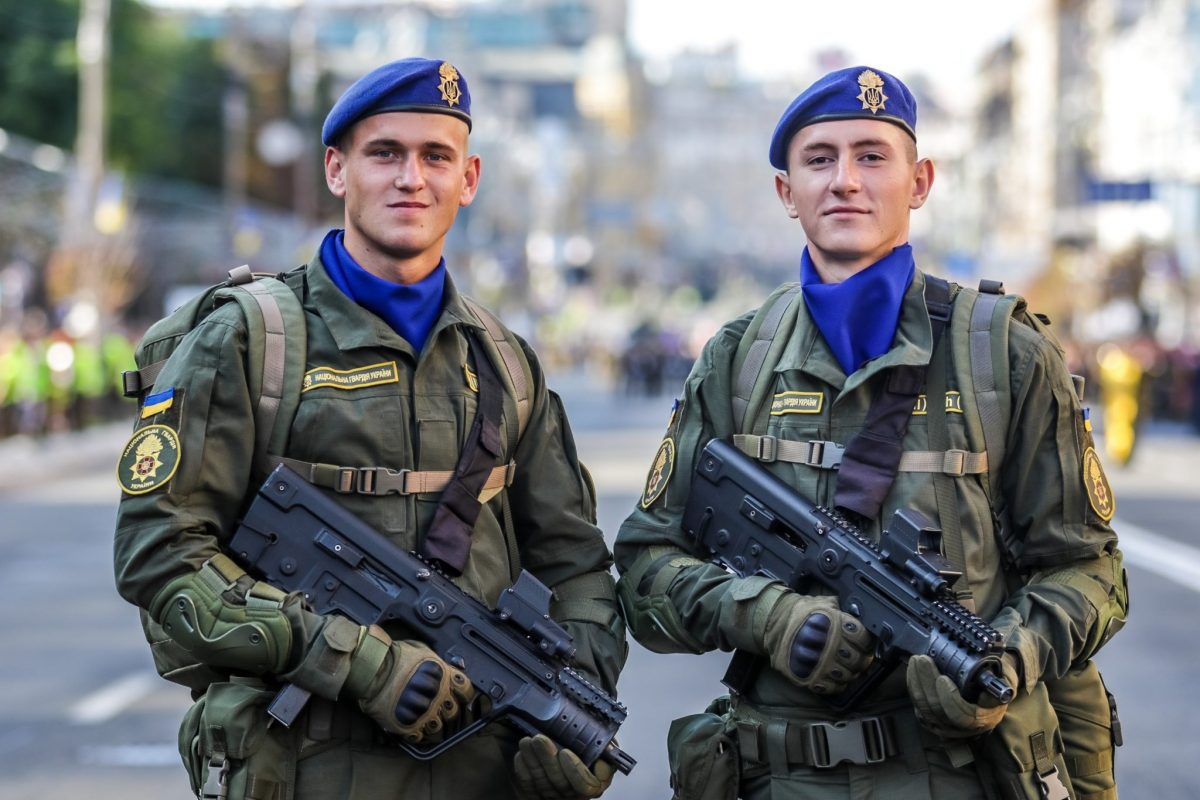
Two members of the National Guard of Ukraine in their parade uniforms

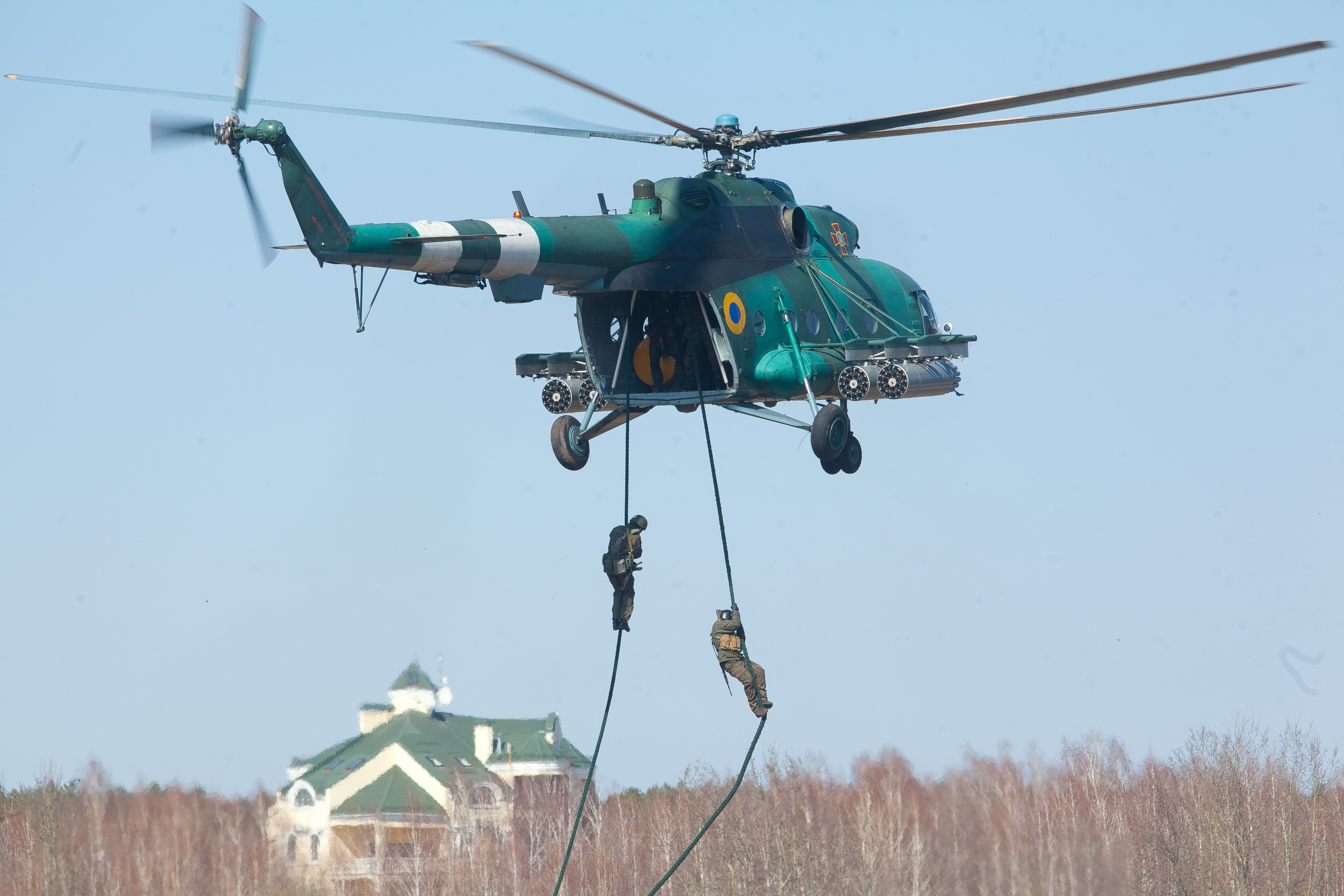
National Guard soldiers fast rope down from a Mil Mi-8 helicopter.

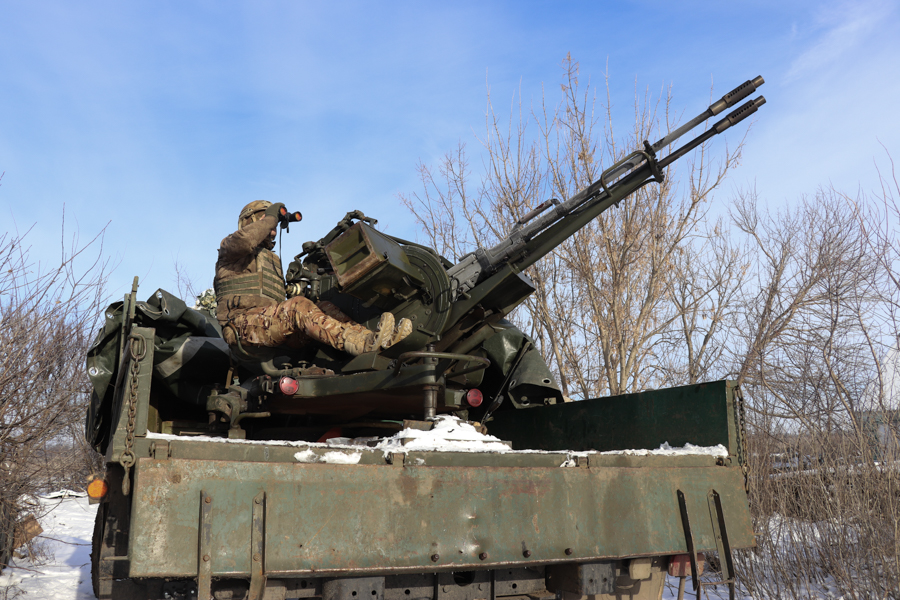
Mobile fire team of National Guard of Ukraine, which shoots Russian drones with anti-aircraft autocannon ZU-23

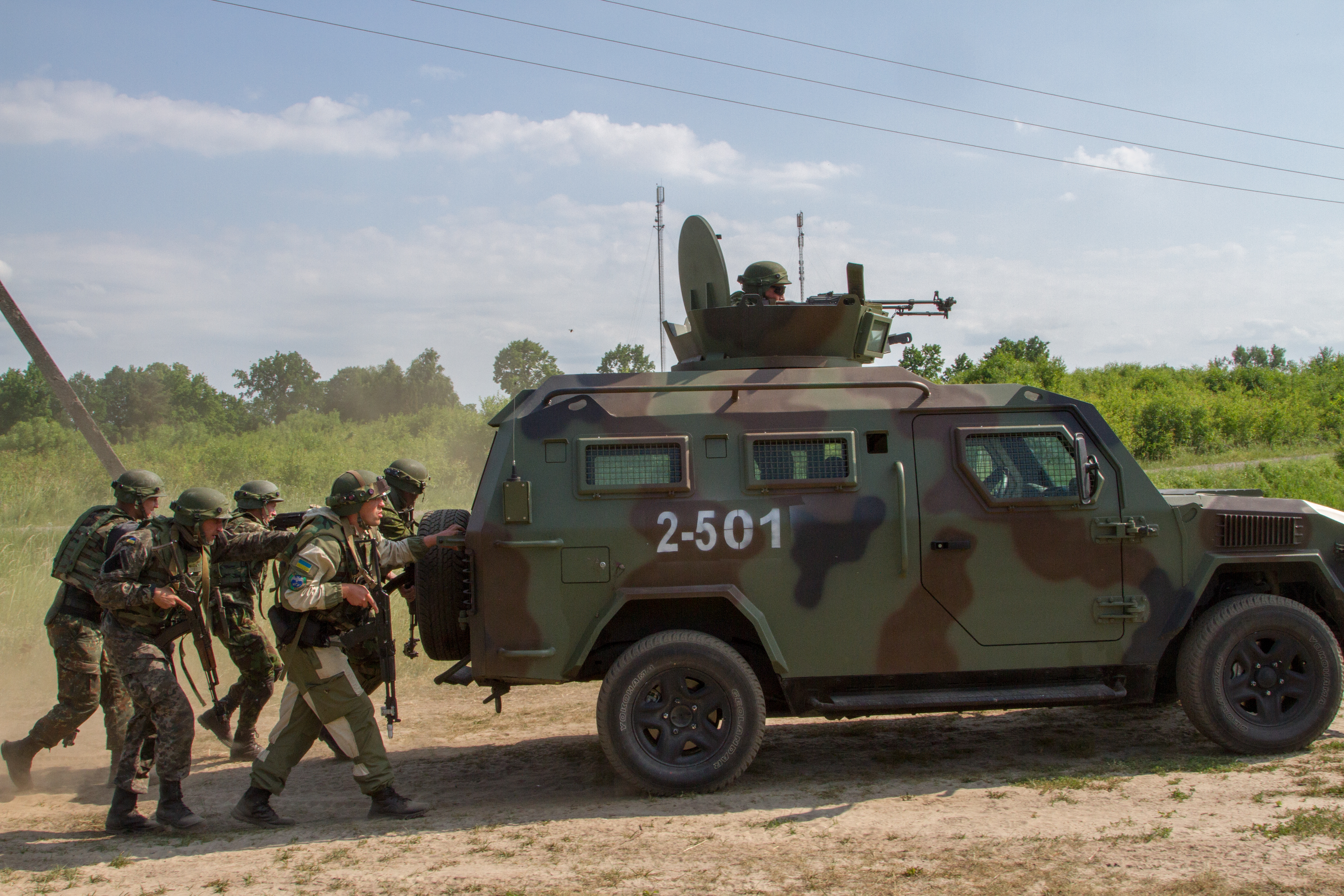
NGU soldiers training behind a KrAZ Cougar armored vehicle

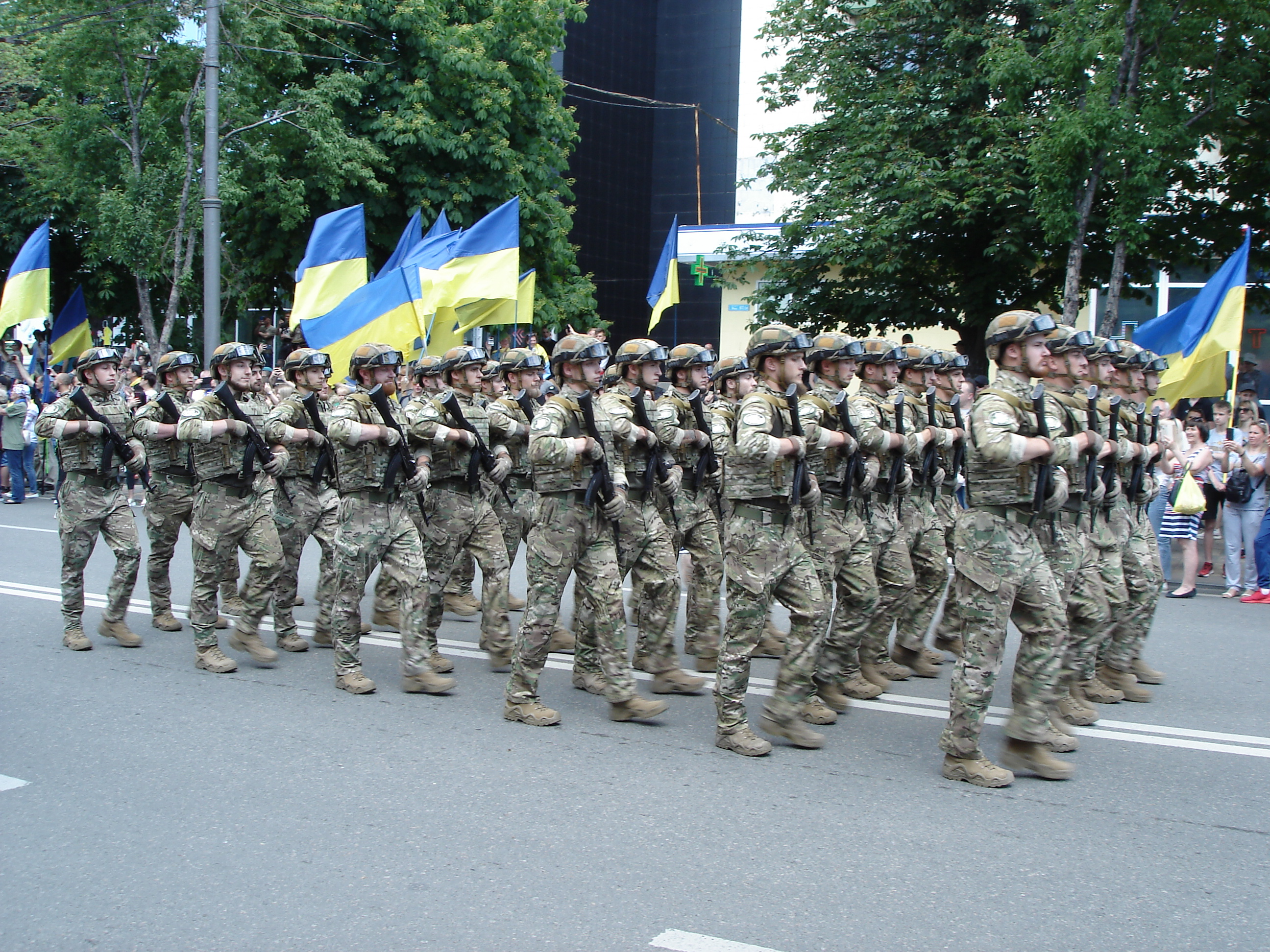
Azov Regiment soldiers in a parade in 2021

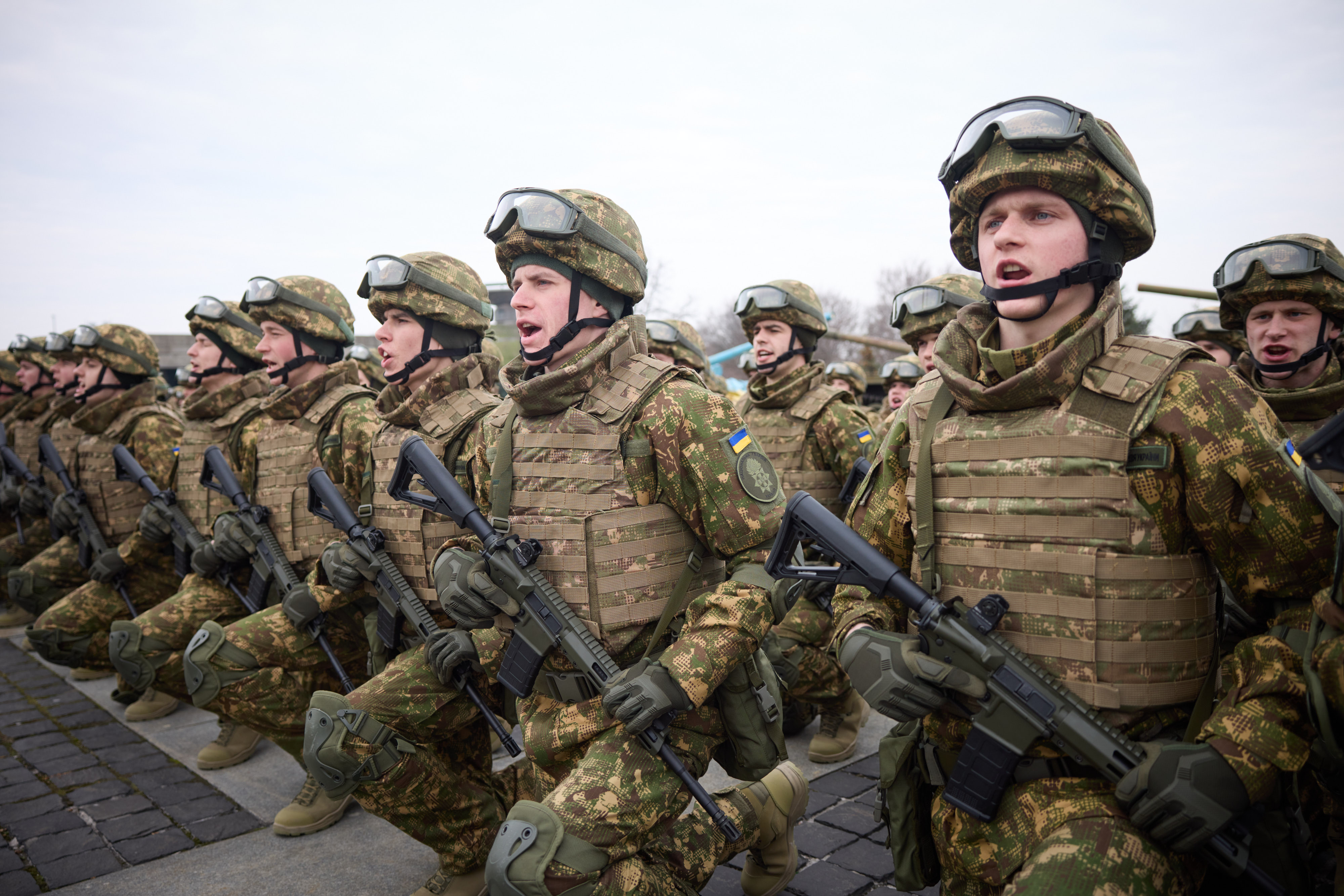
National Guard soldiers in 2023

== See also ==
- Novi Petrivtsi – Location of one of the training bases for the National Guard
- Law enforcement in Ukraine
- Territorial defence battalions (Ukraine)
- National Guard of Russia – Russian equivalent
- People's Armed Police – Chinese equivalent
- United States National Guard – American equivalent
- Бог простить / God Will Forgive (short film) – The film was shot with the assistance of the National Guard of Ukraine

== External links and further reading ==
- Media related to National Guard of Ukraine at Wikimedia Commons
- Official website
- National Guard recruitment webpage, operated by the Ministry of Internal Affairs (In Ukrainian). Accessed 29 March 2014.
- Spetsnaz NGU. Unofficial website.
- Taras Kuzio, "The non‐military security forces of Ukraine." The Journal of Slavic Military Studies 13, no. 4 (2000): 29–56.
