= Internal Troops of Ukraine =

Former gendarmerie of Ukrainian military

Internal Troops of Ukraine Внутрішні війська України
- Cross of the Internal Troops

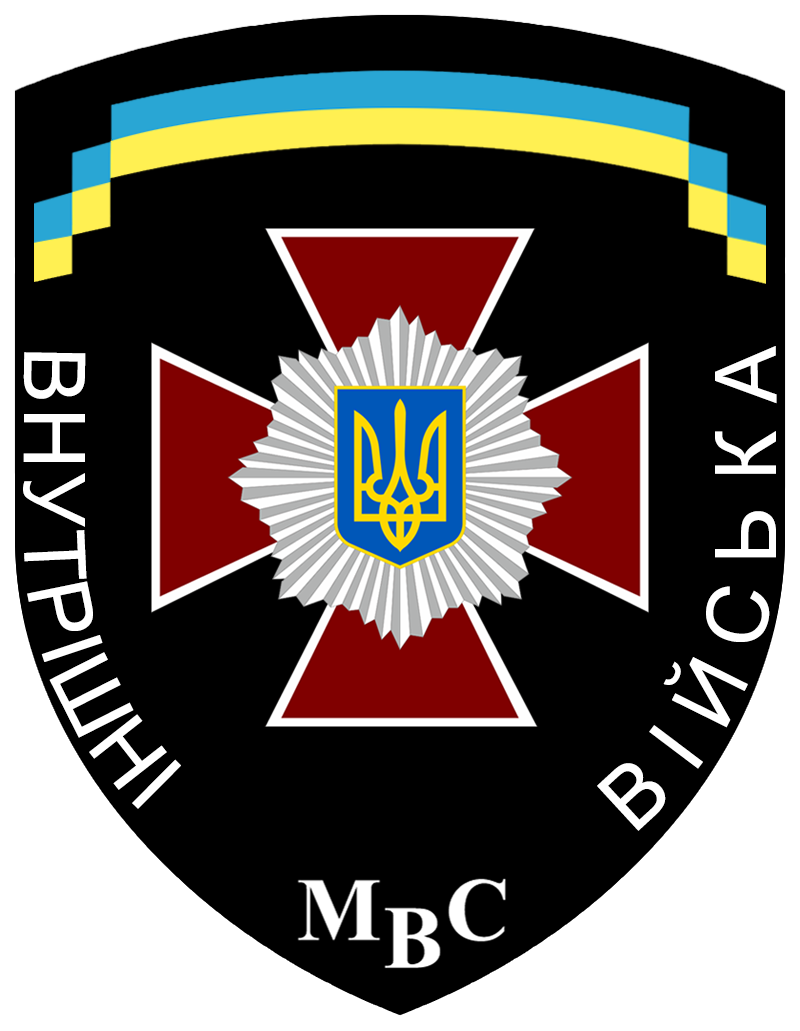
- Patch of the Internal Troops

- Flag of the Internal Troops
- Abbreviation: VV
- Motto: Честь, Мужність, Закон; Honor, Courage, Law

Agency overview
- Formed: 5 January 1992
- Preceding agency: Internal Troops of the Soviet Union
- Dissolved: 13 March 2014
- Superseding agency: National Guard of Ukraine
- Employees: 33,000

Jurisdictional structure
- Operations jurisdiction: Ukraine
- Governing body: Ministry of Internal Affairs
- General nature: Gendarmerie

Operational structure
- Headquarters: Kyiv
- Minister responsible: Arsen Avakov, Minister of Internal Affairs
- Agency executive: Stepan Poltorak, Commander

Notables
- Significant operations: Orange Revolution; Euromaidan; Revolution of Dignity; 2014 pro-Russian unrest in Ukraine
- Anniversaries: 20 February; 26 March

Website
- Archived website

The Internal Troops of Ukraine (Ukrainian: Внутрішні війська України, romanized: Vnutrishni Viiska Ukrainy), abbreviated VV (ВВ), were a uniformed gendarmerie and internal troops of Ukraine. They were subordinate to the Chief Directorate of Ministry of Internal Affairs (the country's civilian police authority), and cooperate with the State Emergency Service of Ukraine. The VV were used to assist militsiya in policing, deal with riots and internal armed conflicts, and safeguard important facilities such as nuclear power plants. In wartime, the Internal Troops were under the jurisdiction of the Armed Forces of Ukraine for local defense and rear area security.

The Internal Troops had similar personnel, bases, equipment, and traditions as the Soviet Internal Troops. Soviet VV units in the Ukrainian Soviet Socialist Republic during the dissolution of the Soviet Union were moved to the jurisdiction of newly independent Ukraine. However, Ukrainian VV troops were not a direct successor of the Soviet Internal Troops (unlike the Internal Troops of Russia) and their structure and tasks had been reformed. As of 2008, the Internal Troops of Ukraine numbered about 33,000.

In 2014 the Ukrainian internal troops were disbanded due to the negative reputation gained during the Euromaidan protests and subsequent revolution. In reforms that followed, the Verkhovna Rada of Ukraine issued a decree on 13 March 2014 transferring the powers of the Internal Troops to the restored National Guard of Ukraine.

== Tasks ==
The Internal Troops assist the militsiya in policing, crowd control, anti-riot operations, defending major facilities, guarding diplomatic missions, combating internal armed disturbances and terrorism (including some special forces tasks) and maintaining order during a state of emergency.

== History ==
=== National Guard and Internal Troops ===
The Internal Troops of Ukraine were formed on January 5, 1992 as part of the Ministry of Internal Affairs as the chief security directorate, and enacted by the Verkhovna Rada on March 26. Before that, all Soviet Internal Troops based in Ukraine were reorganized into the National Guard of Ukraine (initially as the Republican Guard) by a January 1991 decree. The troops later returned to their former tasks (and name), and the National Guard was disbanded.

=== Internal security during election unrest ===
The Orange Revolution was a series of peaceful protests which overturned a presidential election during the winter of 2004–2005, resulting in the election of Viktor Yushchenko. On November 28, 2004 over 10,000 Internal Troops mobilized to suppress protests on Independence Square in Kyiv by orders of their commander, Lt. Gen. Sergei Popkov. The SBU warned opposition leaders about the crackdown.

Oleksandr Galaka, head of the GUR, made calls to "prevent bloodshed". SBU chief Col. Gen. Ihor P. Smesko and military counterintelligence chief Maj. Gen. Vitaly Romanchenko warned Popkov to pull back his troops, and he complied. SBU senior officers claimed credit for averting a situation they said risked bloodshed and, possibly, civil war.

=== Reorganization attempts ===
After a decade within the Ministry of Internal Affairs, the Internal Troops were reorganized. In May 2007, an ongoing political crisis led to a jurisdictional dispute over the troops. President Viktor Yushchenko issued a decree moving the Internal Troops from the Ministry of Internal Affairs to the jurisdiction of the President. On May 25, the Internal Troops loyal to the president marched to Kyiv. The Ministry of Internal Affairs criticized the decree and the troop movements.

Both sides avoided further clashes. The Internal Troops returned to their routine tasks, re-establishing coordination with the police, but the legal dispute over the troops remained unsolved. The Troops command was loyal to the president, in accordance with the decree appealed in court by the Cabinet of Ministers.

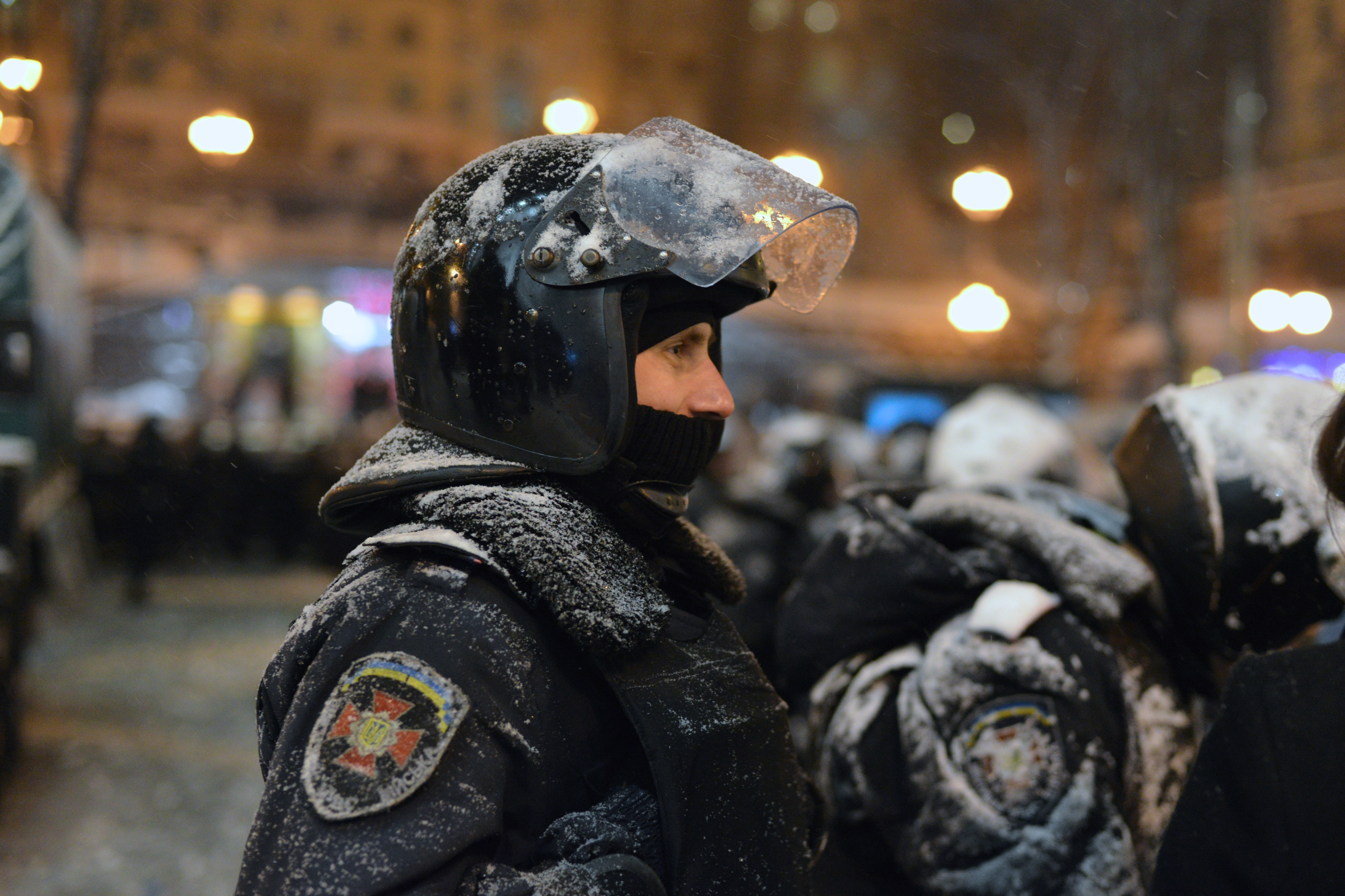
Internal Troops riot trooper during the Euromaidan

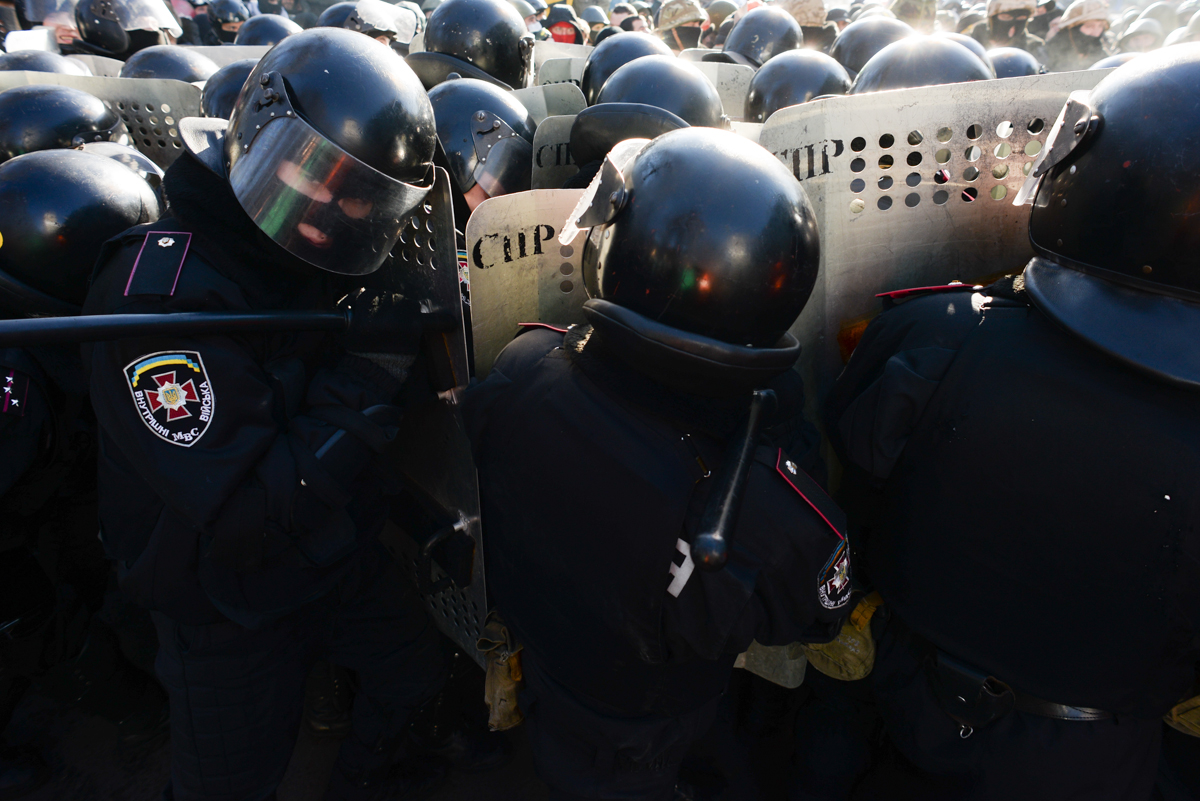
Line of Internal Troops holding protective position against protesters

== Organization ==
Although they reported to a civilian militsiya, the Internal Troops of Ukraine were a paramilitary force with a centralized system of ranks and service. The chief commander and staff of the Troops maintain a separate chain of command, and VV battalions and regiments were under the command of six territorial commanders (who report to the chief commander). The VV units were stationed on military bases throughout the country, including central Kyiv.

The Internal Troops had an aviation brigade, initially formed from the 51st Separate Helicopter Guard Regiment (Oleksandriia, Kirovohrad Oblast) and the 31st Special Helicopter Battle Squadron (Bila Tserkva). In 2000 the 51st Separate Helicopter Brigade was reinforced by an aviation squadron from the Yaguar special-operations unit, obtaining an additional airfield in Kalynivka, Vinnytsia Oblast.

=== Territorial divisions ===
There were six territorial commands (Територіальним командуванням), abbreviated TpK (EN:Trk): West, North, East, Center, South, and Crimea. Each TrK has units assigned to it, identified by a four-digit number.

==== Western TrK ====
- Lutsk (#1141)
- Lviv (#4114)
- Zolochiv, Lviv Oblast (#3080)
- Podillya (#3053) – Khmelnytskyi, Kamianets-Podilskyi
- Prykarpattya (#1241) – Chernivtsi, Ivano-Frankivsk, Kalush
- #3002 – Lviv, Ternopil, Rivne and Uzhhorod

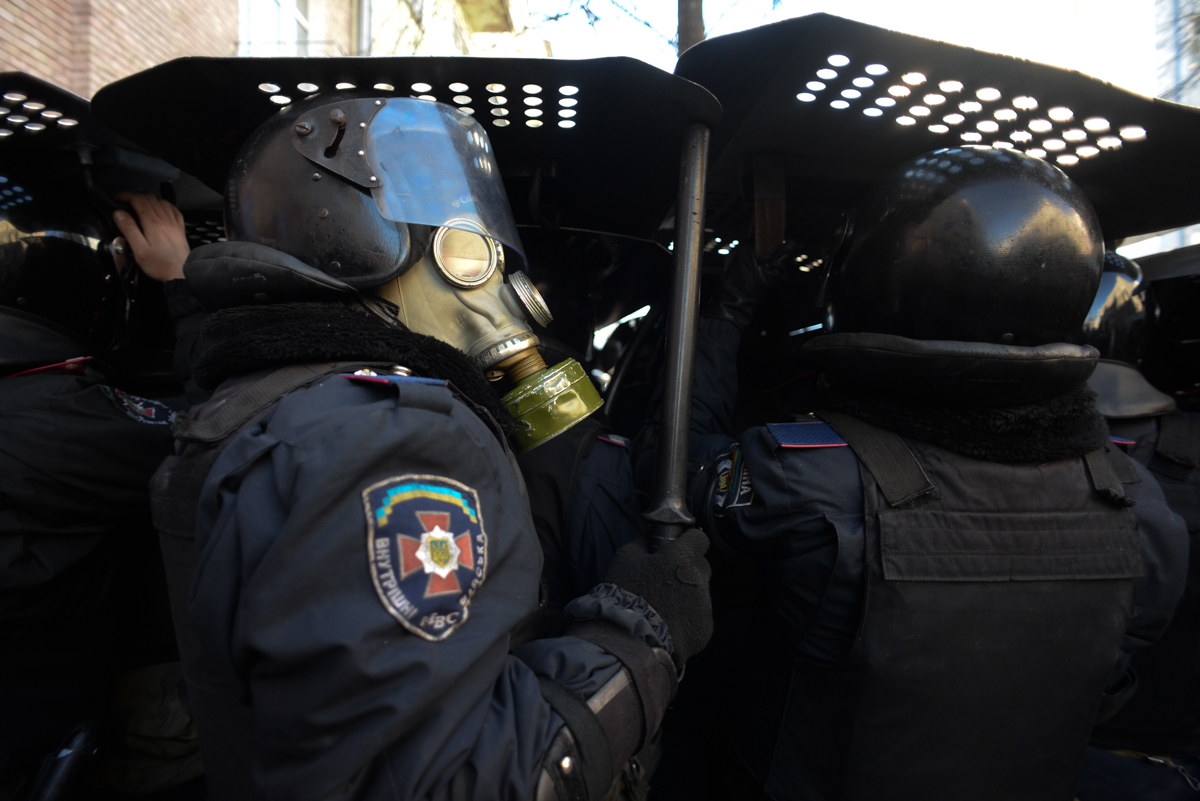
Internal Troop soldier with a gas mask behind a line of riot shields during clashes at the Euromaidan

==== Crimean TrK ====
- Simferopol (#3009), nicknanamed Lavanda (Lavender) - Mountain-rifle special-operations unit, initially a battalion but currently a company. Lavanda has a squadron (Skat) of military divers, and cooperates with Tin (Shadow) Company, an intelligence unit in Balaklava.
- Yevpatoria (#3055)
- Gaspra (#3058)
- Sevastopol (#4110)
- East Crimea (#4125) – Feodosia-13, Krasnokamianka, Sudak, Tyhr (Tiger) special-ops unit

==== Southern TrK ====
- Vinnytsia (#3008)
- Odesa (#3014)
- Odesa (#3012)
- Mykolaiv (#3039)
- Kherson (#3056)

==== Kyiv Northern TrK ====
- Vyshhorod Raion, Kyiv Oblast (#3027) – Nicknamed Bars (Snow leopard)
- Kyiv (#3030)
- Kyiv (#3066)
- Zhytomyr (#3047)
- Cherkasy (#3061)

==== Eastern TrK ====
- Donetsk (#2249)
- Donetsk (#3004)
- Donetsk (#3037)
- Kharkiv (#3005)
- Luhansk (#3035)
- Sumy (#3051)
- Mariupol, Donetsk Oblast (#3057)

==== Central TrK ====
- Central Ukraine (#3011) – Kryvyi Rih, Kirovohrad
- Zaporizhzhia Oblast (#3033) – Zaporizhzhia, Enerhodar, Melitopol, Berdiansk
- Zaporizhzhia (#3026)
- Dnipro (#3036)
- Dnipro (#3054)
- Poltava (#3052)
- Kremenchuk, Poltava Oblast (#3059)

=== Direct jurisdiction ===
- Kyiv (#2260)
- Kyiv (#3078)
- Kyiv (#3081)
- Vyshhorod Raion, Kyiv Oblast (#3077)
- Slavutych, Kyiv Oblast (#3041)
- Dnipro (#3021)
- Pavlohrad, Dnipropetrovsk Oblast (#3024)
- Zaporizhzhia (#2274)
- Zaporizhzhia (#3029), named as Hepard
- Enerhodar, Zaporizhzhia Oblast (#3042)
- Okhtyrka Raion, Sumy Oblast (#2276)
- Shostka, Sumy Oblast (#3022)
- Oleksandriia, Kirovohrad Oblast (#2269)
- Donetsk (#3023)
- Kalynivka, Vinnytsia Oblast (#3028) (nicknamed Yahuar)
- Netishyn, Khmelnytskyi Oblast (#3043)
- Yuzhnoukrainsk, Mykolaiv Oblast (#3044)
- Varash, Rivne Oblast (#3045)

=== Special units ===
In 1994, three regiments of special-assignment units were created to increase the Internal Troops' capability against organized crime. All were named for felidae: Bars (Snow Leopard, near Kyiv), Yahuar (Jaguar in Vinnytsia Oblast), and Hepard (Cheetah in Zaporizhzhia). On May 19, 2004, the 37th Separate Battalion of Internal Troops moved from Pavlohrad to Crimea, becoming the 47th Special-Assignment Regiment (later Tyhr, Tiger).

The Bars brigade, part of the Kyiv territorial command, includes a special-assignment Omega battalion (an anti-terrorist sniper unit). The Tyhr regiment is part of the Crimea territorial command; Yahuar and Hepard were company-sized regiments under the Chief Directorate of Internal Troops.

=== Other units ===
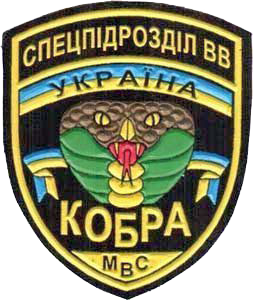
Patch of Kobra

Kobra (Cobra) is a mountain-rifle special-ops battalion headquartered in Balaklava. Its present status is unclear. Skorpion, an anti-terrorist unit that maintains the security of nuclear facilities such as the Chernobyl AES, was originally part of the National Guard of Ukraine.

The 290th (Novorossiysk) Regiment was formed in April 1942 as part of the Soviet Internal Troops' mechanized infantry. During World War II, it defended the Georgian Military Road, participated in the liberation of Novorossiysk and maintained order in areas liberated from Nazi occupation. On November 24, 1945 the regiment was relocated to Kyiv, where until 1947 it fought gang violence in western Ukraine. In 1970 the regiment maintained order in Odesa during a cholera epidemic, and participated in security during the 1980 Summer Olympics.

In 1985, it maintained order at the Moscow World Youth Forum. From April 26, 1986, to May 1987 the regiment served in the aftermath of the Chernobyl disaster, maintaining order and preventing looting. From 1988 to 1991, it conducted a peacekeeping mission in the Caucasus. In 1992, the regiment joined the National Guard of Ukraine. After the disbanding of the National Guard in 2000, in accordance with a presidential decree it was transferred to the Armed Forces of Ukraine.

== Personnel ==
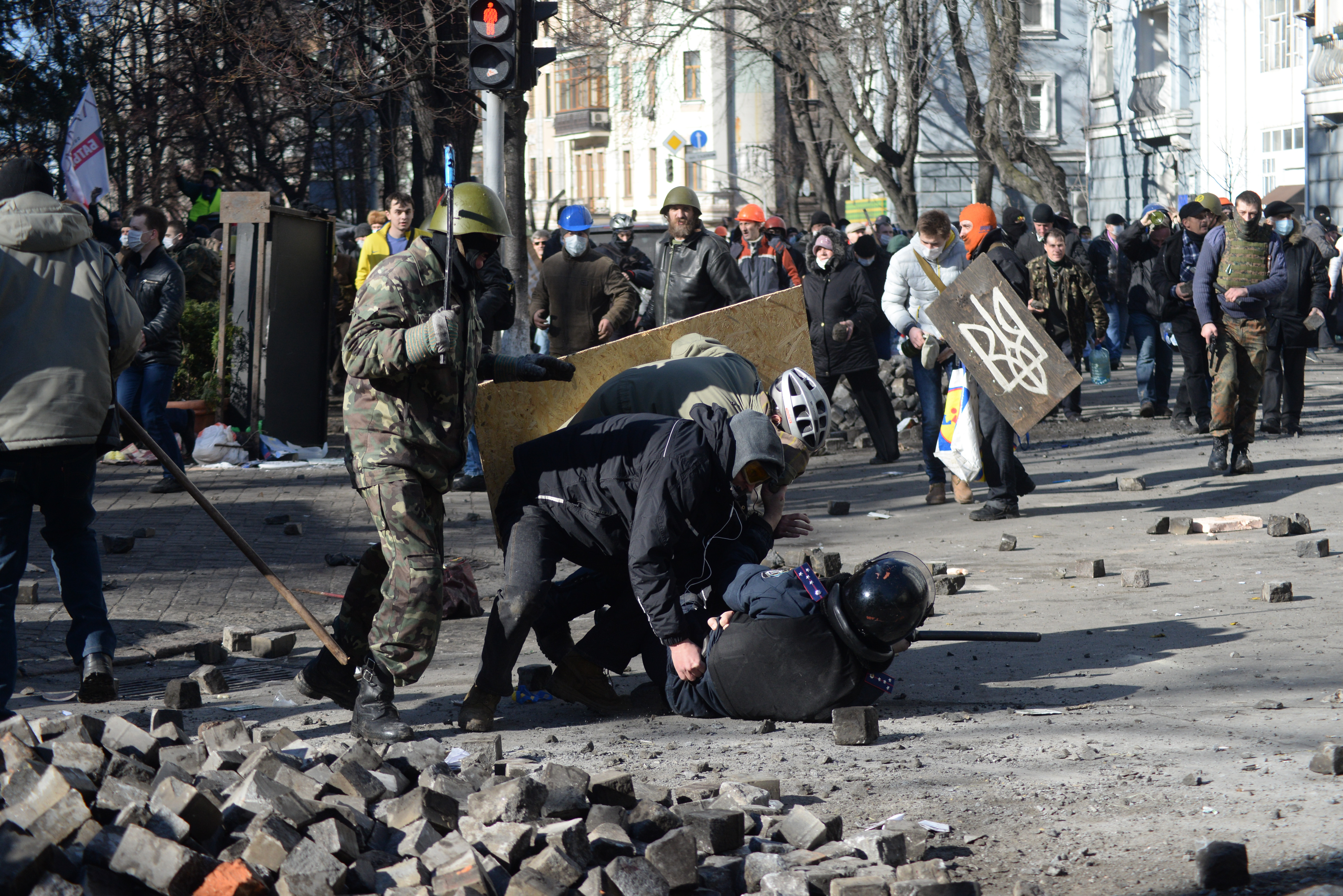
Police officer attacked by protesters during clashes in Kyiv, February 18, 2014

The Internal Troops had gradually changed from the Soviet conscript system (similar to that for the Soviet Army) to the contract-personnel system. Conscription was ended by President Viktor Yanukovych in October 2013. VV officers were trained at the Internal Troops Academy.

== Commanders ==
The Internal Troops have been commanded by:

- Lieutenant General Mykola Lytvyn: 2001
- General of Army Oleksandr Kikhtenko: 2005–2010
- Lieutenant-General Serhiy Yarovyi: 2010–2014
  - Lieutenant-General Serhiy Konoplyanyk: 2010–present (first deputy and commander of the VV in battle and special training)
- Lieutenant-General Stepan Poltorak: 2014

== Equipment ==
During the Euromaidan protests, the Internal Troops were seen armed with Soviet small arms such as Makarov pistols, Kalashnikov rifles, SVD sniper rifles, and PKM machine guns, alongside Western sniper rifles such as the Sako TRG-22 and locally produced copies of the Brügger & Thomet APR.

== See also ==
- European Gendarmerie Force
- Novi Petrivtsi – Internal Troops training range, currently used to train National Guard of Ukraine recruits
- National Police of Ukraine
