= Tyhr (special unit) =

Special unit of Ukraine

47th Special Purpose Regiment "Tyhr"
- 47-й полк спеціального призначення «Тигр»
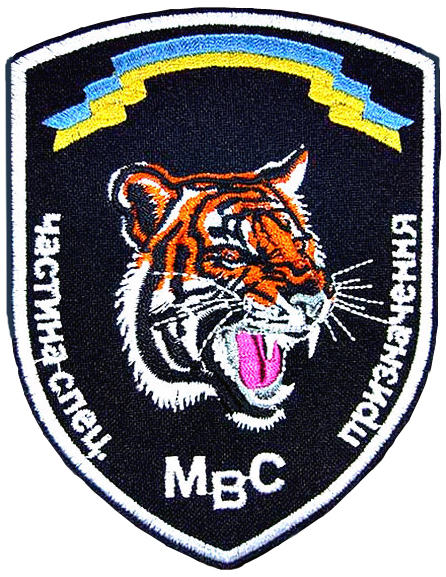
- Active: 2004–present
- Allegiance: Ukraine (2004–2014); Russia (2015–present)
- Role: Internal security Counter terrorism Law enforcement
- Size: 730
- Part of: Internal Troops of Ukraine (2004–2014); Internal Troops of Russia (2015–2016); National Guard of Russia (2016–present)
- Garrison/HQ: Krasnokamianka; Sudak
- Engagements: Euromaidan; 2014 Hrushevskoho Street riots; 2014 pro-Russian unrest in Ukraine; Annexation of Crimea by the Russian Federation

Commanders
- Notable commanders: Yuriy Lebid

The 47th Special Purpose Regiment "Tyhr" was a special unit of the Internal Troops of Ukraine that existed from 2004 to 2014 and was stationed in Crimea. The unit performed special tasks for the protection of public order, preservation of the constitutional order, neutralization of subversive groups and counter-terrorism. It was staffed by contractors and conscripts. Its armament is composed of small arms and light artillery. The location of the unit is the village of Krasnokamianka of the Feodosia City Council. One of the battalions was stationed in Sudak. In total, the regiment included three special purpose battalions.

Tyhr was noted for its extensive learning and significant experience, enabling it to tackle tasks of any complexity. In 2011, the unit was awarded the title of best special unit of the Internal Troops.

Tyhr actively suppressed Euromaidan activists. In March 2014, after the annexation of Crimea, elements of the unit betrayed its oath and defected to Russia. The 144th Special Motorized Regiment of the Internal Troops of Russia was formed from the base of Tyhr.

== History ==
On 23 March 2004, mass clashes took place in Simferopol between the Crimean Tatars and the pro-Russian population of the city. The Ukrainian authorities, together with the Mejlis, managed to settle the situation and prevent further escalation of the conflict. Afterwards, the country's leadership decided to strengthen the grouping of the internal troops in Crimea. On 19 May 2004, in accordance with Order No. 537 of the Ministry of Internal Affairs of Ukraine, the 37th Separate Battalion of the Air Force (military unit 4125) was redeployed to Crimea from Pavlohrad. The new location of the battalion was the village of Krasnokamyanka of the Feodosia City Council. In the summer, the 47th Special Purpose Regiment was formed from its base, which later received the name "Tyhr." On 7 September, the regiment received a battle flag, which was personally presented by President Leonid Kuchma and the head of the Ministry of Internal Affairs, Mykola Bilokon . After that, the unit officially began to perform official tasks.

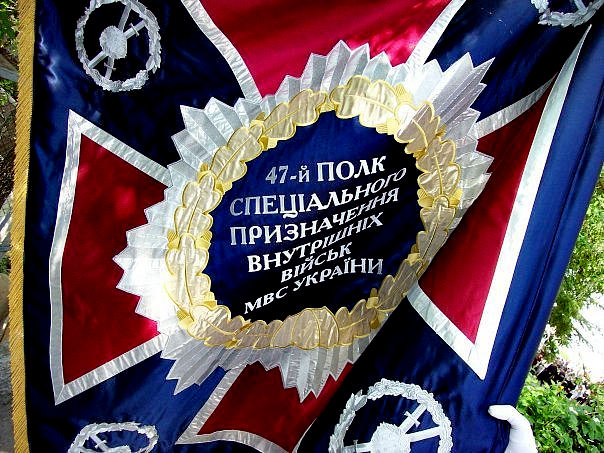
Battle flag of the regiment

=== 2004–2013 ===
During the Orange Revolution in November to December 2004, the regiment's servicemen were stationed in Kyiv, where they maintained order during mass protests and protected administrative buildings.

On 3 December 2005, in order to prevent an epidemic of bird flu, President Viktor Yushchenko imposed a state of emergency in the territory of five settlements of the Sovietskyi, Dzhankoi, and Nyzhnohirskyi Raions of Crimea. The Tyhr was assigned the task of guarding the perimeter of the quarantine zone. On 29 December, when the threat of the epidemic disappeared, the president canceled the state of emergency and the servicemen of the unit returned to their places of deployment.

The special unit has repeatedly been involved in the assistance during natural disasters. For example, on the nights of 1–2 July 2006, a dam burst due to heavy downpours in the Bilohirsk Raion of the Autonomous Republic of Crimea, as a result of which seven settlements were flooded. Special forces, together with employees of the Ministry of Emergency Situations, eliminated the breach of the dam and eliminated the consequences of flooding. They also patrolled flooded villages to prevent looting.

Self-seizure of land in Crimea often led to serious conflicts. One of them arose in the fall of 2007, when the Crimean Tatars, despite the court's decision, refused to vacate arbitrarily occupied land and demolish illegal structures on Mount Ai-Petri. In order to implement the court's decision, the leadership of the Crimean militia prepared a special operation in which about a thousand law enforcement officers were involved, including the Berkut and Tyhr special units. About 50 Crimean Tatars opposed them on Ai-Petri, but their resistance quickly dissipated. During the clashes, four people were injured, and fourteen more were arrested. After that, all illegal structures were demolished, and the land was returned to the state.

The regiment regularly participated in competitions among special forces of the internal troops. In May 2011, Tyhr won first place. From 16 to 30 June 2011, soldiers of the regiment underwent a training course under the guidance of specialists from the National Gendarmerie of France, during which they got acquainted with the tactics of European police officers.

During Euro-2012, three hundred servicemen of the regiment were sent to Donetsk. From 8 to 28 June, they patrolled the streets of the city and ensured the safety of visitors to the official fan zone, and after the end of the championship, they returned to their places of deployment.

=== Euromaidan ===
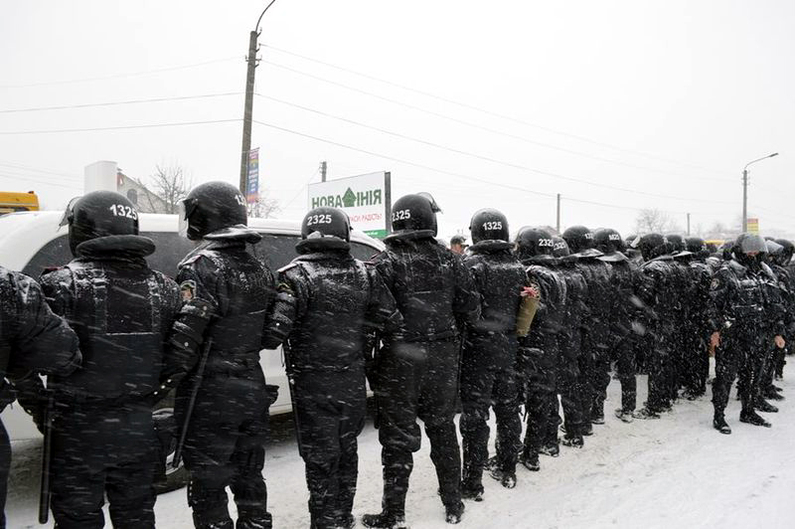
Tyhr servicemen in Vasylkiv trying to leave for Kyiv, 9 December 2013

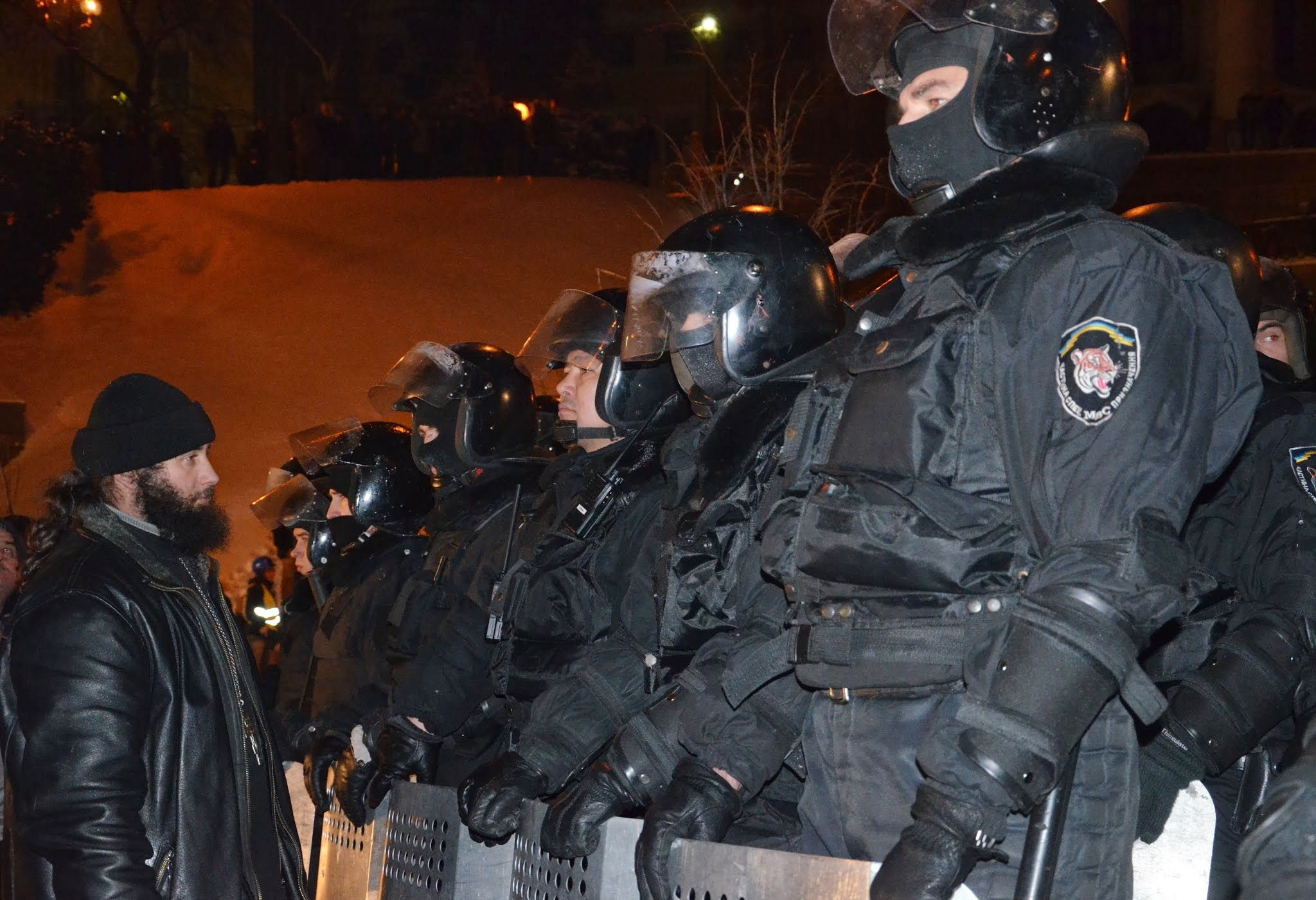
Tyhr on the Maidan in Kyiv, 11 December 2013

At the beginning of December 2013, when mass protests against Viktor Yanukovych began in Kyiv, 730 special forces soldiers were transferred to the capital. They were placed on the territory of the training center of the Air Force in the city of Vasylkiv. On 6 December, the Tyhr tried to leave for Kyiv, but were blocked by local Euromaidan activists. On 9 December the soldiers of the regiment, using force, managed to break through to Kyiv and at the same time ensure the advancement of two other units to the capital. On 11 December, the unit took part in an unsuccessful attempt to disperse Euromaidan activists. Together with the Berkut, the special forces eliminated the barricade on Instytutska Street, but due to the resistance of the demonstrators, they were unable to advance further. Around 11 o'clock, the Tyhr left the Maidan. During the confrontation, 12-13 soldiers of the regiment were injured.

The Tyhr actively participated in the 2014 Hrushevskoho Street riots, during which the regiment, together with other units of the Internal Troops and Berkut, held positions near Mariinskyi Park. The most dramatic events involving the special unit unfolded on 18–20 February 2014. On 18 February around 11 o'clock in the morning, after an almost three-week lull, mass clashes between protesters and law enforcement officers resumed. At that time, the Tyhr was occupying positions in Mariinsky Park near the building of the Verkhovna Rada. During the skirmishes, Tyhr and other units of the Ministry of Internal Affairs managed to push the Euromaidan activists away from the park. According to the then commander of the special unit, Colonel Yuriy Lebid, during the clashes near the Verkhovna Rada, officers of the regiment stopped the aunts who were beating the lying protesters. After that, security forces began to advance down Instytutska Street. Tyhr occupied the premises of the October Palace, which had been abandoned by the Euromaidan activists the day before. When the soldiers of the regiment entered the building, the first wounded from firearms appeared among them. In the evening of the same day, during clashes on Independence Square, with an interval of half an hour, two officers of the regiment were killed by firearms: senior lieutenants Vitaly Goncharov and Dmytro Vlasenko. On 20 February around 9 a.m., the protesters went on the offensive. They managed to dislodge the law enforcement officers from the territory of the Maidan and approach the October Palace, where the soldiers of the 47th Special Forces Regiment were stationed at that time. The latter, in turn, left the building and went behind the barricade near the Khreshchatyk metro station, and then up Instytutskaya Street to the Verkhovna Rada. During these clashes, the protesters detained 67 law enforcement officers, among whom were the servicemen of the regiment headed by the deputy commander for public security, Colonel Timur Tsoi. The next day they were released and arrived on the territory of one of the internal troops. On 23 February, the personnel of the unit, which was in Kyiv during the mass protests, returned to its base in Crimea.

=== Annexation of Crimea ===
After the Euromaidan, the regiment was involved in events related to the annexation of Crimea. In the first days of the Russian intervention, a KAMAZ truck drove up to the checkpoint of the military unit, in which there were about ten Russian servicemen of the 810th Marine Brigade led by a captain. However, after negotiations with Yuriy Lebid, they left, and after that there were no unusual situations near the unit until the Crimean referendum. During this period, the commander of the Coastal Defense Forces of the Black Sea Fleet of the Russian Federation, Major General Oleksandr Ostrikov, repeatedly called the commander of the regiment, offering to let elements of the Russian military enter the territory under the pretext of protection against provocations by the Right Sector, but his proposals were rejected.

After the referendum, on 18 or 19 March, Russian servicemen headed by a lieutenant colonel entered the territory of the unit and blocked the car park. Members of the Crimean Self-Defense Force made an unsuccessful attempt to block the unit's checkpoint and persuade its servicemen to swear allegiance to the Republic of Crimea. Later, the location of the regiment was occupied by the Russian Armed Forces. Simultaneously, there were no battles or skirmishes on the territory of the unit during the entire confrontation in the Crimea. As a result of the annexation of the peninsula, a significant part of the regiment's servicemen, primarily officers and contract workers, defected to Russia. On 29 March, a group of soldiers, mainly conscripts from other regions of Ukraine, who remained faithful to the Ukrainian oath, led by commander Yuriy Lebed, left the location of the unit and returned to the territory controlled by the Ukrainian authorities. Most of them were transferred to units of the National Guard stationed in Donetsk Oblast.

After the annexation of Crimea, Tyhr was officially disbanded, but the territory of the unit, weapons, equipment, personnel came under the control of Russia, where the 144th Special Motorized Regiment of the Internal Troops of the Ministry of Internal Affairs of Russia was formed from its base. The new unit became part of the 112th Separate Brigade of the North Caucasus District.

== Structure ==
- Two Special Purpose Battalions (Krasnokamyanka village)
- Special Purpose Battalion (Sudak)

== Assignments ==
Special unit "Tyhr" performed the following assignments:

- Protection of public order during mass events,
- Protection of public order in case of emergency situations
- Patrol service,
- Suppressing group hooliganism and mass riots
- Detention of armed criminals,
- Release of hostages,
- Force support of police operations,
- Disarming subversive groups and combating terrorism,
- Provision of physical assistance to the State Border Guard Service of Ukraine in case of unrest at the border,
- During armed conflicts, it was to serve as an assault unit

== Completing and preparation ==
Tyhr was staffed with contractors and conscripts. The selection system, as in other special units of the internal troops, was quite strict. Each candidate underwent an interview, medical examination and testing. Physical parameters were taken into account (for example, one had to be at least 175 cm tall), and the level of education. At the same time, preference was given to candidates with secondary special or higher education.

The training of new recruits lasted for several months and included intensive physical training, combat tactics, shooting with various types of weapons, use of special equipment, and hand-to-hand combat. For the first 1.5 months, they performed law enforcement tasks as trainees. Only 2.5 months after taking the oath, recruits became full-fledged special forces fighters.

== Equipment ==
- AK-74M
- RPK-74
- SVD Dragunov
- Makarov pistol
- RPG-7
- Sfera and "Mask" protective helmets
- Gas smoke grenades "Cheremukha-1, -4, -5, -6" and "Teren-6"
- Zorya-2 and M84 stun grenades
- BTR-80

== Commanders ==
- Lieutenant Colonel Valentin Panov (2004)
- Colonel Yuriy Anatoliyovych Lebid (until 2014)
