= 2022 Dnipro shooting =

Mass shooting in Dnipro, Ukraine

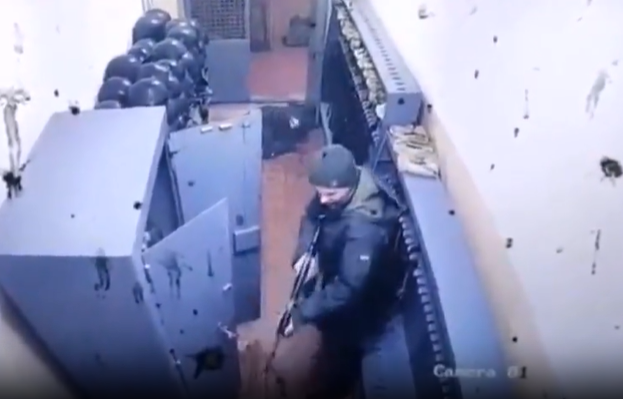
- Riabchuk (bottom), seen holding the firearm during the shooting. The body of a fellow soldier lays behind him.
- Location: Dnipro, Ukraine
- Date: 27 January 2022
- Weapon: AKS-74U
- Deaths: 5
- Injuries: 5
- Perpetrator: Artemiy Yuryovich Riabchuk

On 27 January 2022, a mass shooting occurred at a Pivdenmash factory in Dnipro, Ukraine. Five people were killed and five others injured.

== Shooting ==
The killings occurred on 27 January 2022, at about 3:40 a.m. in the city of Dnipro, as guards began handing out weapons to the servicemen at a Pivdenmash factory. A National Guard of Ukraine conscript armed with a reported AKS-74U assault rifle shot dead four male servicemen and one civilian woman, (Note: A video has surfaced alleging that the woman was shot after she refused to open a door for him.) and wounded five others. Two soldiers of the twenty-two soldiers present managed to escape and call an ambulance and policemen. The shooter fled the scene with his weapon. At about 9.30 am, he was detained in the town of Pidhorodne after he reported himself to the police.

== Investigation ==
The State Bureau of Investigation launched criminal proceedings against officials of the National Guard of Ukraine.

The Ministry of Internal Affairs of Ukraine created a special investigative commission, which is authorized to establish the causes of the tragedy.

== Accused ==
According to law enforcement agencies, Artemiy Riabchuk, a National Guard of Ukraine serviceman from the Odesa Oblast, born in 2001, was the one who had shot at the servicemen. His name is translated to both /Riabchuk/ and /Ryabchuk/. The State Bureau of Investigation informed the detainee of suspicion of murder, desertion, and theft of weapons. A possible terrorist motive is not to be ruled out.

According to one lawmaker, Riabchuk had been bullied in the past.

== Aftermath ==
As a result of the shooting, 5 people were killed and 5 others were seriously injured. Ukrainian President Volodymyr Zelenskyy condemned the shooting as "terrible" and extended messages of empathy to the victims' families. Over 40 National Guard members initiated a program to help victims receive blood donations.

Commander of the National Guard of Ukraine Mykola Balan resigned in response.

== Judicial proceedings ==
On 28 January 2022, the Kirovsky District Court of the city of Dnipro ordered Artemiy Ryabchuk to be detained without bail for a period of 60 days. On 11 March 2022, Ryabchuk's pretrial detention was extended until 9 May 2022. Ryabchuk's case went to court in October later that year. On 23 April 2024, Ryabchuk was found guilty and sentenced to life in prison.

== See also ==
- 2026 Kyiv shooting, another mass shooting in Ukraine that happened four years later
- 2012 Karavan mall shooting, another mass shooting in Ukraine
- Heidelberg University shooting, another mass shooting in Europe which happened just three days earlier

== Sources ==
- The National Guard of Ukraine official website
- The Ministry of Internal Affairs of Ukraine official website
- The State Bureau of Investigations official website
- The investigation is considering several versions of the shooting at Pivdenmash, including illegal relations between servicemen
