= Mykola Balan =

Ukrainian lieutenant general (born 1968)

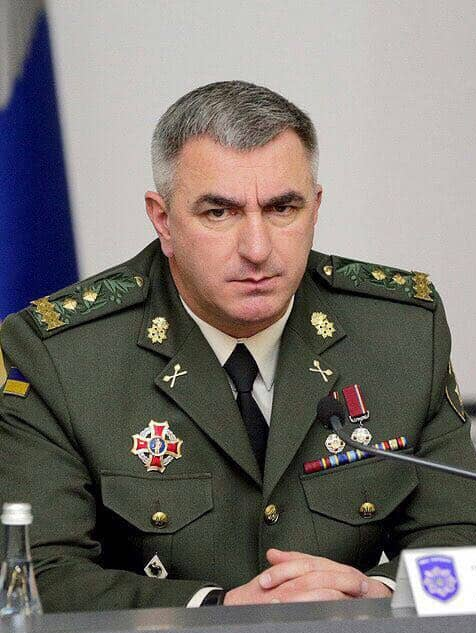
- Born: 12 December 1968 (age 57); Staryi Lysets, Ukrainian SSR, Soviet Union
- Military career
- Allegiance: Ukraine
- Branch: Internal Troops of Ukraine; National Guard of Ukraine
- Service years: 1992–present
- Rank: Lieutenant general
- Commands: National Guard of Ukraine; Crimean territorial command

Mykola Ivanovych Balan (Ukrainian: Микола Іванович Балан; born 12 December 1968) is a Ukrainian lieutenant general. He was commander of the National Guard of Ukraine (May 7, 2019 – January 27, 2022).

== Biography ==
Balan is a native of western Ukraine who in 1992 graduated the Saratov Higher Military Command School of the Red Banner of Feliks Dzerzhinsky of the Ministry of Internal Affairs of the Soviet Union. In 2003, he also graduated the Khmelnytskyi National Academy of the Border Troops of Ukraine. Balan graduated with honors from the National Academy for Public Administration under the President of Ukraine.

In 2010, was appointed as a chief officer of the Crimean territorial command of the Internal Troops of Ukraine.

Since 2014, he became among the leading commanding officers as a deputy commander of the newly revived National Guard in place of Internal Troops.

From February 6, 2015 to December 31, 2015, he served as the Commander of the National Guard of Ukraine.

On 14 June 2019 President of Ukraine Volodymyr Zelenskyy appointed Mykola Balan commander of the National Guard of Ukraine. Balan resigned as commander of the National Guard of Ukraine due to a shooting involving servicemen in Dnipro, Ukraine. He was officially dismissed by President Zelenskyy on 27 January 2022.

== Decorations ==
- Order of Merit, 2nd degree (24 March 2017) – for personal courage and high professionalism discovered in defense of state sovereignty and territorial integrity of Ukraine, exemplary execution of military duty
- Order of Merit, 3rd degree (23 March 2012) – for a significant personal contribution in strengthening the rule of law and order, the fight against crime, exemplary performance of official duty, high professionalism and on the occasion of the Day of Internal Troops of the Ministry of Internal Affairs of Ukraine

Military offices
Preceded by Yuriy Allerov	Commander of the National Guard of Ukraine; 2019–2022	Succeeded by Yuriy Lebid
Preceded by Oleksandr Kryvenko as acting	Commander of the National Guard of Ukraine as acting 2015	Succeeded by Yuriy Allerov
