= Yuriy Lebid =

Ukrainian military officer (born 1967)

- Юрій Анатолійович Лебідь
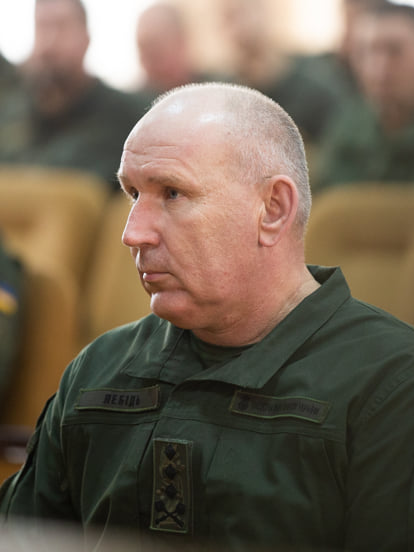
- Lebid in 2022
- Born: 2 May 1967 (age 59); Sumy, Sumy Oblast, Ukrainian SSR, Soviet Union
- Military career
- Allegiance: Soviet Union; Ukraine
- Branch: Internal Troops of Ukraine; National Guard of Ukraine
- Rank: General
- Commands: National Guard of Ukraine; Tyhr Regiment

General Yuriy Anatoliyovytch Lebid (Ukrainian: Юрій Анатолійович Лебідь; born 2 May 1967) is a Ukrainian military officer. From 2022 to 2023, he was the commander of the National Guard of Ukraine.

== Biography ==
Lebid was born in Sumy. In 1988 he graduated from the Sumy Higher Artillery Commando School. In 2004 he graduated from the Ivan Chernyakhovsky National Defense University of Ukraine. He went from platoon commander to commander of the Tiger Special Purpose Regiment.

During Euromaidan, Lebid was in command of the Internal Troops Tiger Regiment, which on 9 December 2013 in Vasylkiv broke the blockade of protesters that prevented the arrival of security forces in Kyiv. In the spring of 2014, he was appointed Acting Head of the Eastern Territorial Department of the National Guard of Ukraine. On 12 May, he was kidnapped in Donetsk by unknown gunmen as he was returning home from duty. He was released a week later.

On 13 June 2019, President Volodymyr Zelenskyy appointed Lebid deputy commander of the NMU. On 27 January 2022 he was appointed Acting Commander, and on 25 February, he was named the Commander of the National Guard.

On 8 July 2023, he was dismissed the Commander of the National Guard.

Military offices
Preceded by Mykola Balan	Commander of the National Guard of Ukraine; 2022–present	Succeeded by Oleksandr Pivnenko
