= Yurii Allerov =

Ukrainian Army general (born 1964)

- Юрій Аллеров
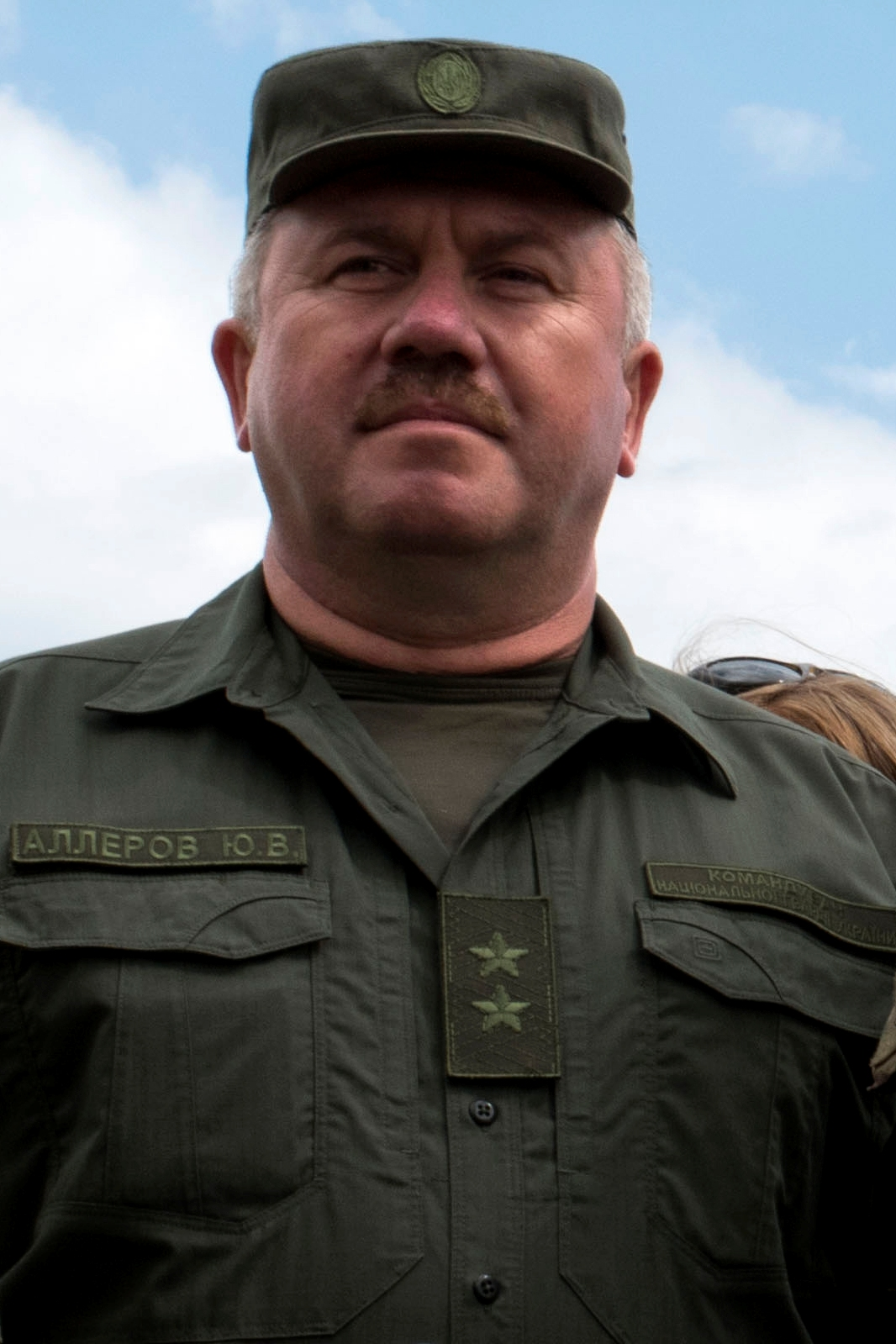
- Lt. Gen. Yuriy Allerov

Commander of the National Guard of Ukraine
- In office 30 December 2015 – 7 May 2019
- Preceded by: Mykola Balan (as acting)
- Succeeded by: Mykola Balan

Personal details
- Born: 6 February 1964 (age 62) Lviv, Ukrainian SSR, Soviet Union

Military service
- Allegiance: Soviet Union; Ukraine
- Branch/service: Internal Troops of Ukraine; National Guard of Ukraine
- Years of service: 1985–present
- Rank: Colonel General
- Battles/wars: Russo-Ukrainian War: War in Donbas; Siege of Sloviansk

Yurii Volodymyrovych Allerov (Ukrainian: Ю́рій Володи́мирович А́ллеров; born 6 February 1964) is a Ukrainian soldier, Colonel general, and former Commander of the National Guard of Ukraine (from 30 December 2015 to 7 May 2019).

== Career ==
In 1985 he graduated from the Leningrad Higher Military School. In 1997 he graduated from the Academy of the Armed Forces of Ukraine, Faculty of Operations and Tactics.

In September 2010, Allerov became the Head of the Western Territorial Command of the Internal Troops of Ukraine.

On 23 August 2011, Yuri Allerov was promoted to the rank of Major general.

In 2012 he was appointed Head of the Southern Territorial Command of the Internal Troops of Ukraine. In August 2012, Allerov again took the position of head of the Western Territorial Command of the Internal Troops of the Ministry of Internal Affairs of Ukraine, which in the spring of 2014 became a structural unit of the newly created National Guard of Ukraine.

On 23 August 2014, Yurii Allerov received the rank of Lieutenant general in accordance with the decree of the President of Ukraine № 678/2014.

Yuri Allerov participated in the development and implementation of military operations during the anti-terrorist operation in 2014, particularly during the Siege of Slovyansk.

From 1 April 2015 to December 2015—Chief Inspector of the Ministry of Defense of Ukraine.

On 30 December 2015, the President of Ukraine Petro Poroshenko appointed Yurii Allerov to the position of Commander of the National Guard of Ukraine (Decree № 733/2015 of 30 December 2015).

On 23 August 2017, he was promoted to the rank of Colonel general.

== Reforming the National Guard of Ukraine ==
Under Allerov, the reform of the National Guard of Ukraine began. According to him, the reform was to take place in two phases: the first phase, from 2016–2017 and the second phase, from 2018–2020. Reforms included changing the governing bodies, organizational and staffing structure, and bringing the governance system up to NATO standards.

In 2016, with the participation of the Commander of the National Guard of Ukraine, a rapid reaction brigade was formed according to NATO standards. At the same time, the first professional light infantry battalion was formed. [12] The first and second company tactical groups were also created. Under the leadership of Yuri Allerov, the National Guard began to assist the National Police in locating and neutralizing criminals who resist the armed forces, guard nuclear power plants and other important facilities, consulates and diplomatic missions of other countries located in Ukraine, together with the Security Service of Ukraine.

== Training centers ==
In 2016, a training unit was established on the basis of the training center in Zolochiv, which trains instructors in combat and special training.

In February 2016, under the leadership of Allerov, the International Interdepartmental Multidisciplinary Training Center of the NGU was established in the village of Stare (Kyiv region), which was visited by a delegation of the California National Guard in the same month.

On 1 September 2017, a network of National Guard recruitment centers began operating throughout the country.

== Cooperation ==
In January 2016, Allerov took part in the opening of the headquarters of the Ukrainian-Polish-Lithuanian brigade "LitPolUkrBrig".

In 2017, with the participation of Allerov, various projects were implemented with defense, law enforcement, NGOs in the United States, Romania and Estonia. Cooperation has been established with the Ministries of Defense of Canada, the United Kingdom, and Sweden.

In April 2018, the Commander of the National Guard of Ukraine agreed to cooperate with the Commander-in-Chief of the Turkish Gendarmerie Arif Cetin, including the exchange of experience in organizing the telecommunications system, rapid response, cyber defense system, logistics system, and training of personnel and units.

== Personal life ==
Yuriis' son Colonel Vladyslav Allerov was killed in May–June 2022 in a battle with Russian Ground Forces in the Kharkiv Oblast near Izium— under enemy's artillery fire he secured the evacuation of his military group's retreat.
