= 2014 Hrushevsky Street protests =

Protests in Kyiv, 2014

- Part of Euromaidan and Revolution of Dignity
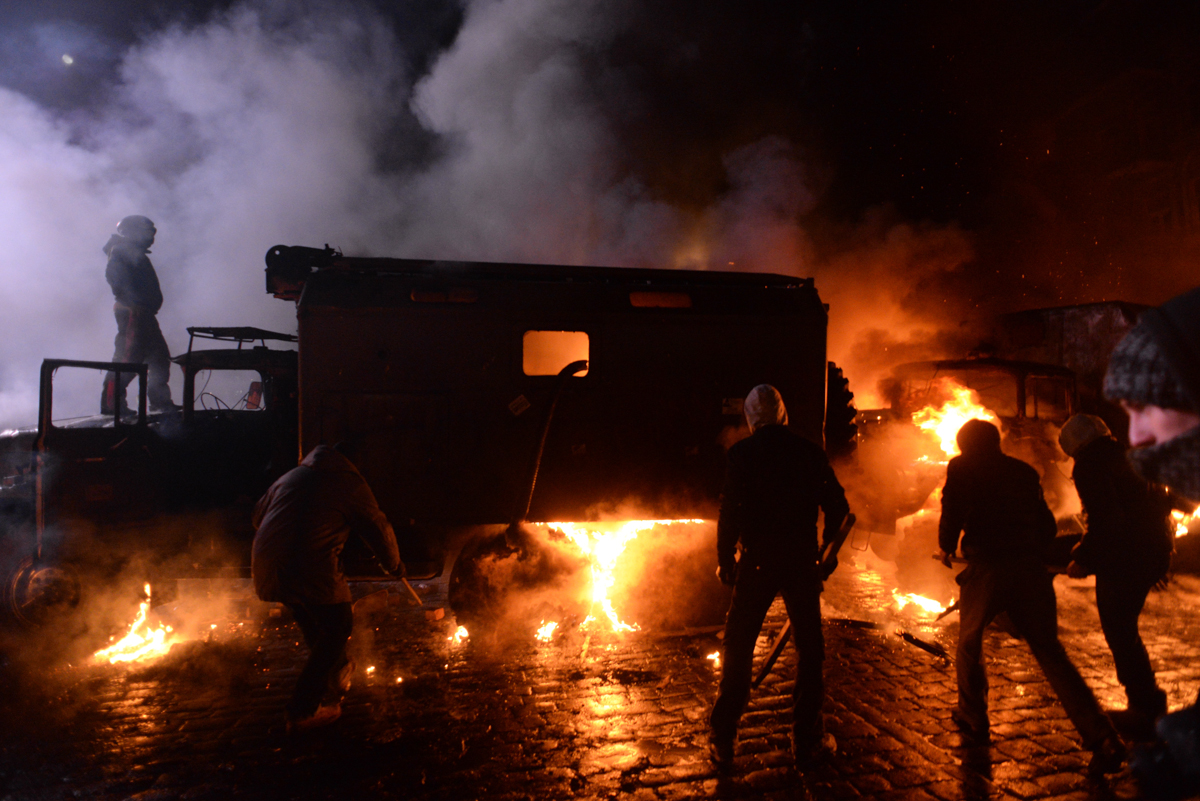
- Hrushevsky street protests in January 2014
- Date: 19–22 January 2014 (protests); 23 January – 17 February 2014 (standoff); 18–23 February 2014 (escalation) (1 month)
- Location: Hrushevsky Street, Kyiv, Ukraine; 50.450417°N 30.529586°E
- Caused by: Anti-protest laws; Lack of direction from Euromaidan leaders; Police brutality; Arrest or kidnapping of activists
- Goals: Repeal of anti-protest laws; Ousting of President Viktor Yanukovych
- Methods: Protesting, riot, civil disobedience
- Status: Protesters dispersed, escalation into the Revolution of Dignity
- Result: 9 of the 12 16 January laws repealed; Resignation of Prime Minister Mykola Azarov; Escalation into the Revolution of Dignity

Parties
Euromaidan protesters; Right Sector; Afghan war veterans	Ministry of Internal Affairs; Berkut riot police; Interior Troops of Ukraine; Titushky

Lead figures
Andriy Parubiy (MP, Euromaidan commandant); Vitali Klitschko (MP); Oleh Tyahnybok (MP); Arseniy Yatsenyuk (MP)	Vitaliy Zakharchenko (Minister of Internal Affairs)

Number
10,000 protesters 200+ rioters	500–1,000+ police 1 armored personnel carrier

Casualties and losses
4 deaths 1,177+ injured 21 missing 70 arrested 42 injured journalists	163 police injured 57 Internal Troops servicemen injured

In response to anti-protest laws in Ukraine (announced on 16 January 2014 and enacted on 21 January 2014), a standoff between protesters and police began on 19 January 2014 that was precipitated by a series of riots in central Kyiv on Hrushevsky Street, outside Dynamo Stadium and adjacent to the ongoing Euromaidan protests.

During a Euromaidan rally which gathered up to 200,000 protesters, participants marched on the Verkhovna Rada and were met by police cordons. Following a tense stand-off, violence started as police confronted protesters. Protesters erected barricades to prevent the movement of government forces. Four protesters were confirmed dead in clashes with police, three of them shot.

On 28 January 2014, 9 of the 12 anti-protest laws were repealed and Prime Minister Mykola Azarov tendered his resignation and a bill offering amnesty to arrested and charged protesters was issued. On 14 February 2014, groups responsible for organizing the standoff agreed to partially unblock the street to restore traffic, but maintain the barricades and ongoing protests. Following the amnesty of protesters on 16 February 2014, police and protesters both retreated while allowing a corridor for traffic. This lasted until 18 February 2014, when thousands marched on parliament once again, reestablishing Hrushevsky Street and related streets in a new standoff with police. By 19 February 2014, all barricades had been cleared from the streets and the protesters pushed back, though violent clashes elsewhere in Kyiv continued to grow in intensity, resulting in the Revolution of Dignity.

== Timeline of the events ==
=== 19 January ===
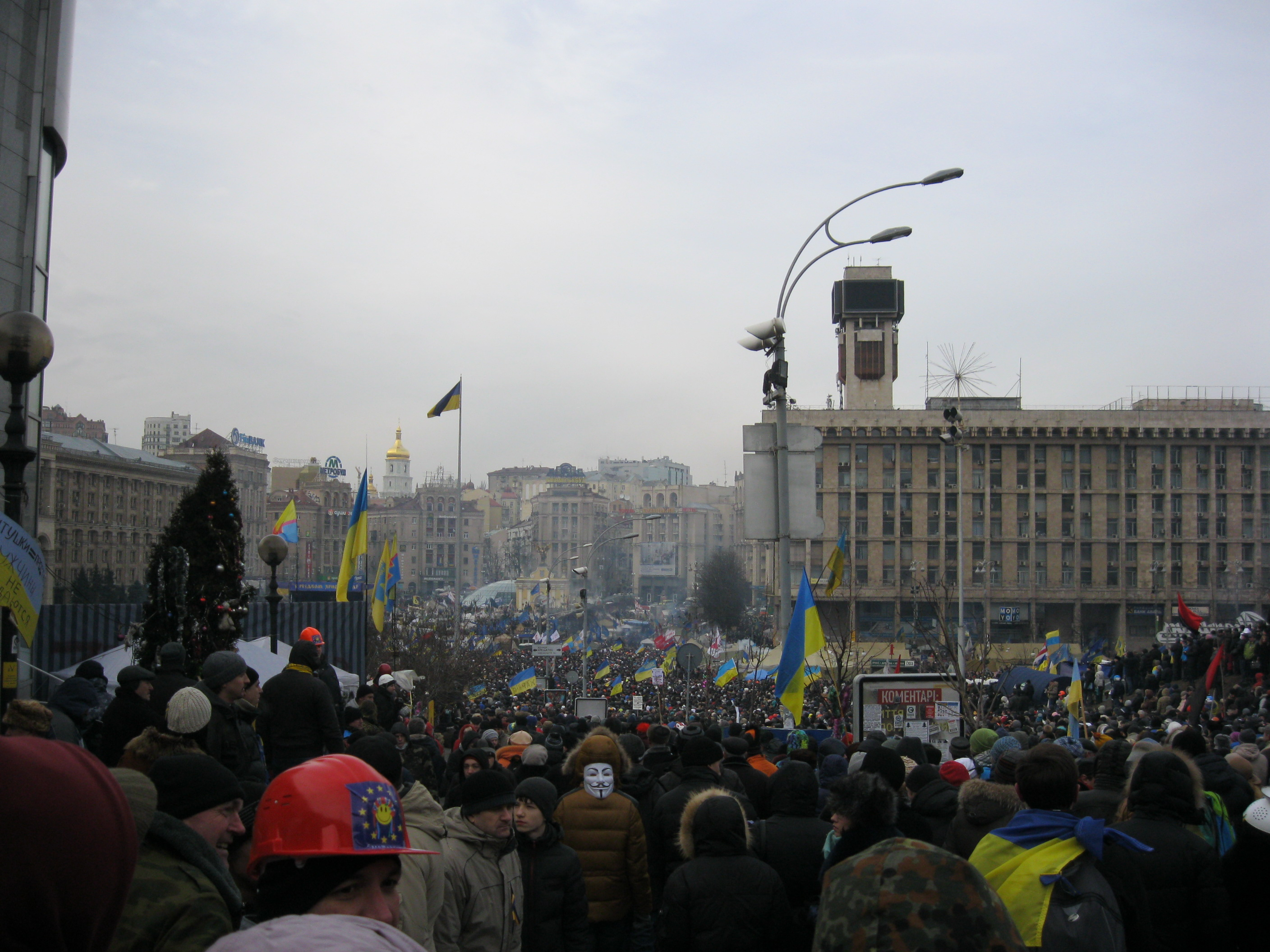
200,000 protesters gathering in Kyiv as a reaction to anti protest laws in Ukraine

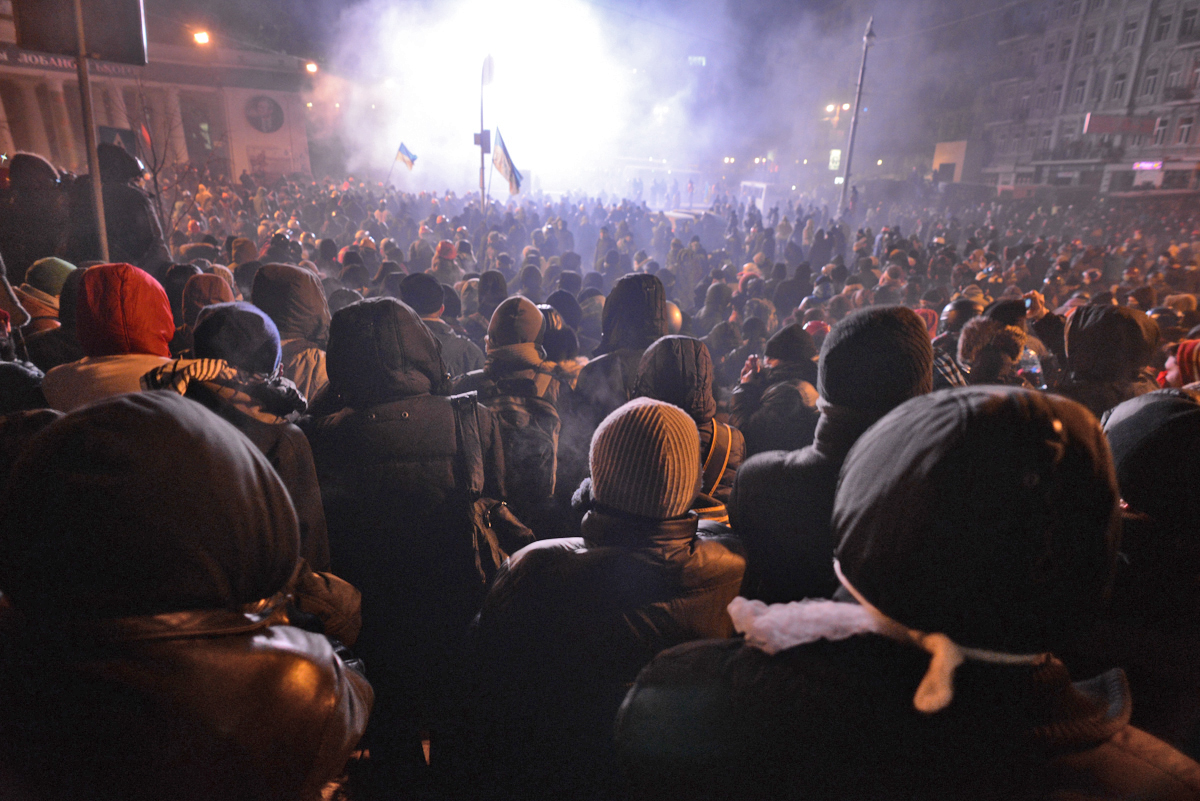
200,000 people took to the streets against the anti-protest laws on 19 January 2014 in Kyiv

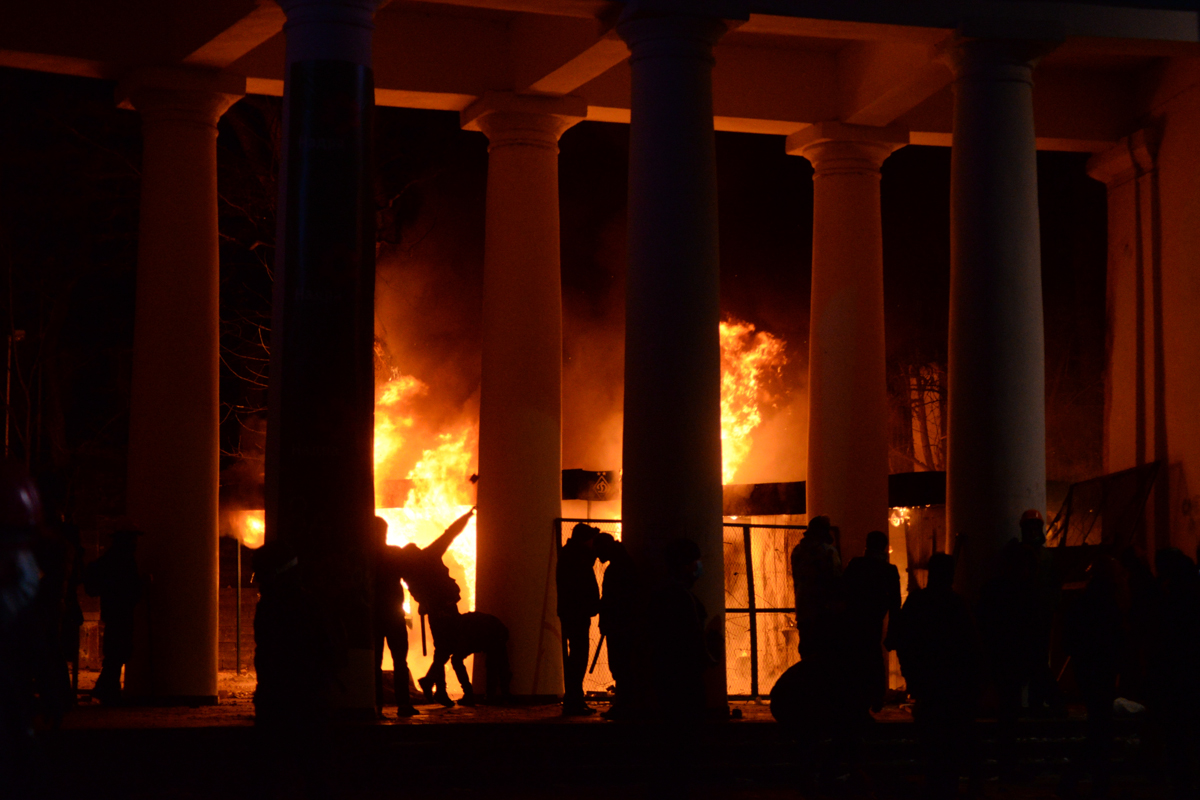
Entrance to the Dynamo Stadium near Hrushevskoho Street on fire on 19 January 2014

On 19 January, a Sunday mass protest, the ninth in a row, took place gathering up to 200,000 in central Kyiv to protest the new anti-protest laws, dubbed the "Dictatorship laws". The rally was attended by opposition leaders, but was also the first public appearance of Tetiana Chornovol since her alleged attack by the authorities. Many protesters ignored the face concealment ban by wearing party masks, while others wore hard hats and gas masks. AutoMaidan leader Dmytro Bulatov demanded a single oppositional candidate be named, and the crowd also chanted against leaders to comply with this action. Batkivshchyna leaders Arseniy Yatsenyuk and Oleksandr Turchynov declared that a new, alternative parliament would be created.

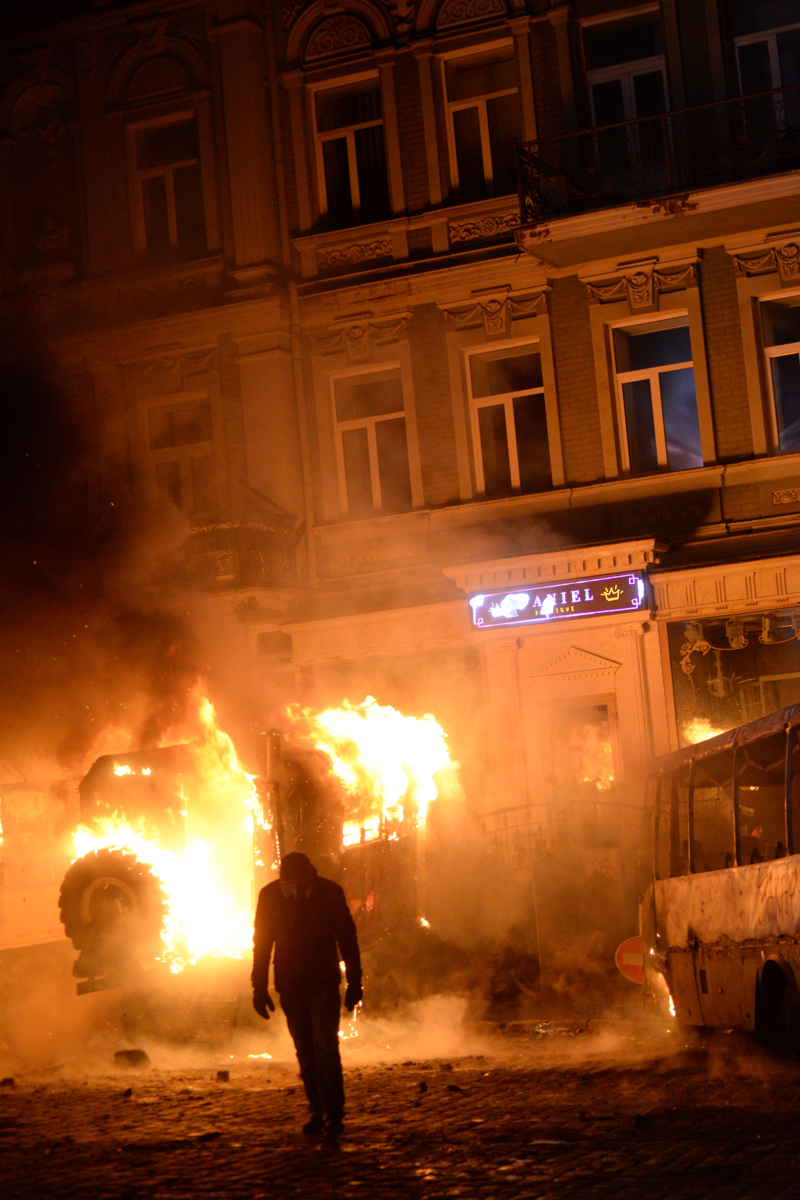
A Pro - EU activist walks near burning barricades and police vehicles on 19 January

Euromaidan activists appealed to the military for its "solemn allegiance to the Ukrainian people" rather than the "criminal regime", and for members of the military and police to not carry out "criminal orders", most notably in the use of force against civilians; they promised those who would be fired for refusing orders of violence would be reinstated once a new government for Ukraine was installed. Former Ukrainian Navy chief, Rear Admiral Ihor Tenyukh, who was removed by President Yanukovych in 2010, warned of the dangers posed by the "coup d'état planned by the current authorities" and called for members of the armed forces to defy "illegal" orders from those in power. "Tomorrow the regime will enslave you too. Therefore we are calling on you to fulfil your military oath of loyalty to the Ukrainian people and not to the authorities who have gone off the rails," he was quoted as saying.

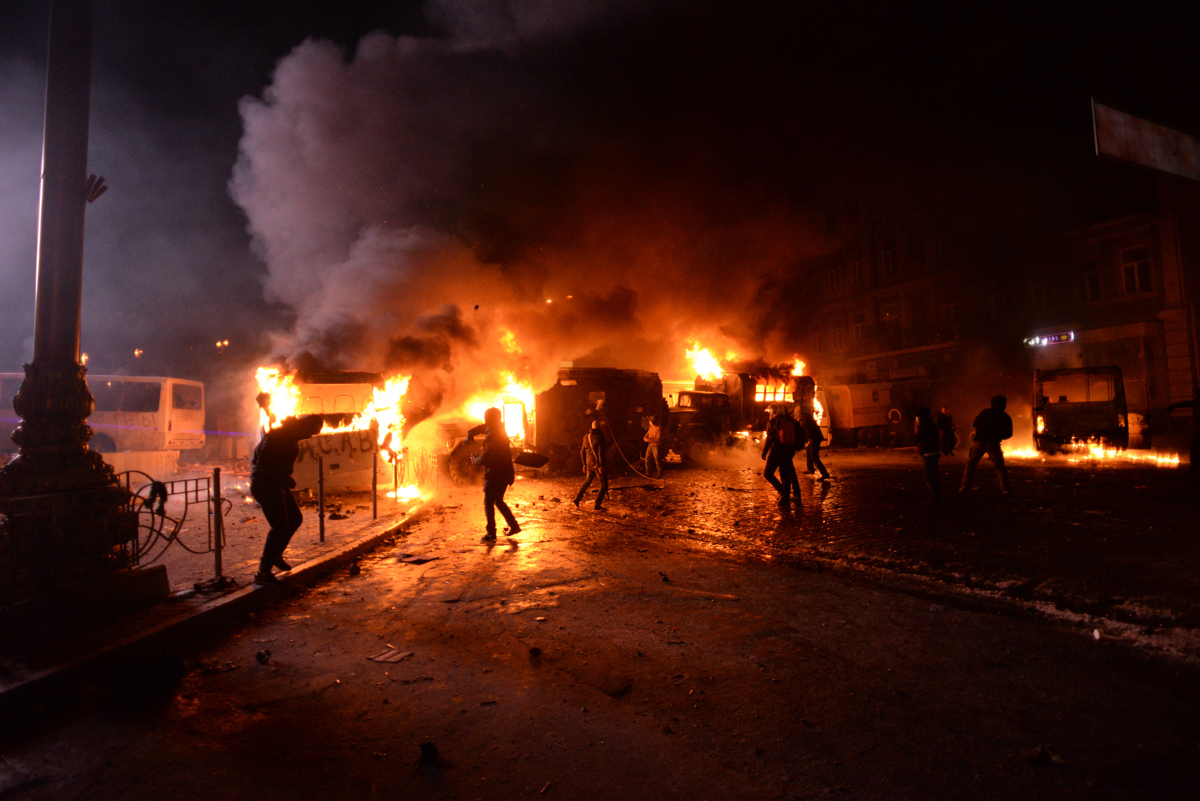
Protesters throwing Molotov cocktails at a police barricade in Central Kyiv

Clashes began as thousands descended upon parliament via Hrushevsky Street, and were met by police cordons, and a blockade of military cars, mini-vans and buses. Police warned protestors via loudspeaker, saying, "Dear citizens, your actions are illegal and are against the state." They also warned that advancing within three meters of police would be considered a threat to police officers' rights and would prompt a response. Tensions developed, and the sides exchanged projectiles as protesters attacked the police barricade armed with sticks, pipes, helmets, and gas masks. They were met with stun and smoke grenades.

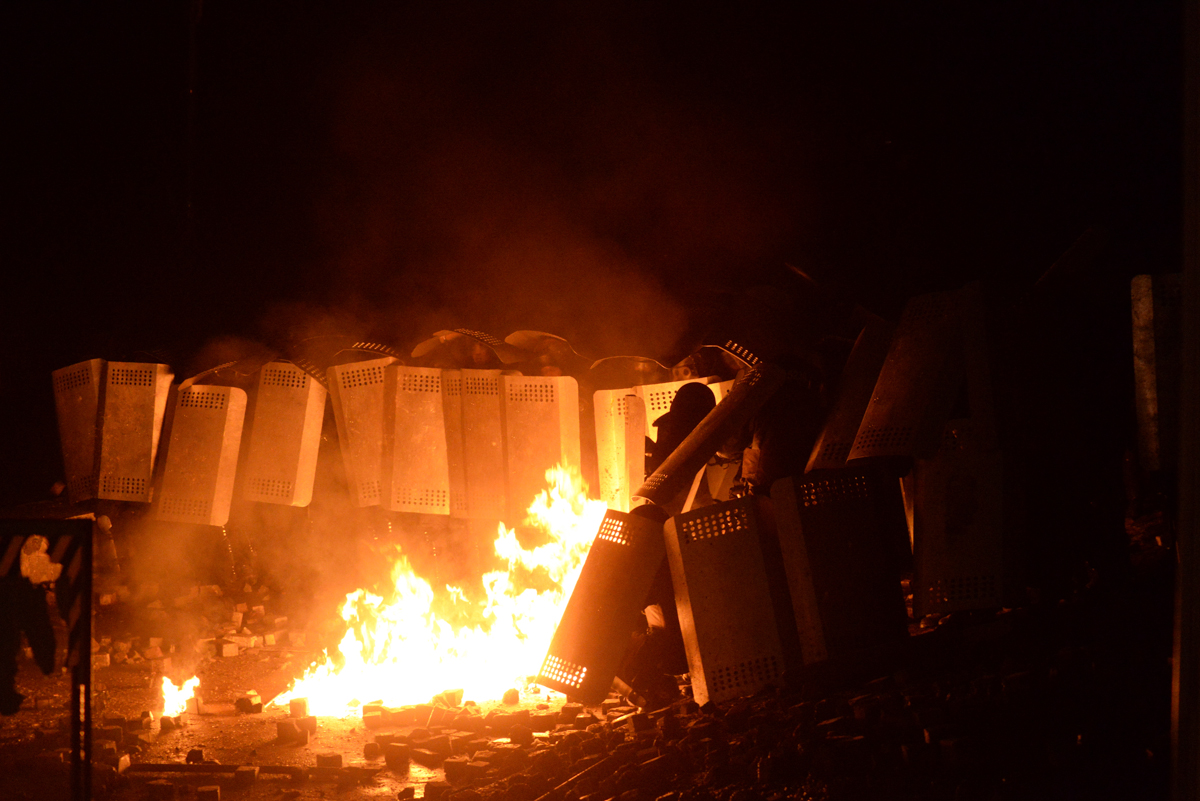
Interior troops holding protective position under Molotov Cocktail rain, Dynamivska str. Euromaidan Protests. Events of 19 January 2014.

Opposition leader Vitali Klitschko attempted to bring calm to the fervor but (Note: The same day he had told Hromadske.TV "We've got two scenarios. The first is not to go to negotiations [with the authorities], the scenario with the use of force could turn to be unpredictable, and I don't rule out a civil war... And in this case we'll use every opportunity to avoid bloodshed".) was sprayed with a fire extinguisher by a protester from the crowd, and shouted down as a traitor. Live TV pictures showed protesters attempting to overturn a bus used by police, which was later set on fire after petrol bombs were thrown. At least three buses were overtaken by demonstrators. Water cannons used to douse the flames were also directed at protesters; an illegal use of force due to freezing temperatures. Later, rubber bullets were used against protesters as more police vehicles were set ablaze. Up to 10,000 protestors remained near the Valeriy Lobanovskyi Dynamo Stadium by 10 p.m. as clashes continued with smoke filling the air from the burning vehicles. The entire line of police buses used in the blockade was set on fire, and as midnight approached, nearly everything in the square by the Dynamo Stadium was burning. Commenting on the situation, opposition MP Lesya Orobets stated, "War has finally started, laws don't apply anymore." Reports from Lviv indicated that demonstrators in Lviv, Kalush, and Ivano-Frankivsk blocked military units from deploying to Kyiv; with a similar situation occurring in Rivne, blocking Berkut troops. Lviv troops later thanked protesters for blocking their deployment. Automaidan activists by 3 a.m. blocked all roads exiting Yanukovych's Mezhyhyria mansion. In the early morning, protesters in central Kyiv continued supplying molotov cocktails and advanced on police cordons while fortifying barricades to their rear as police continuously used water cannons, fired rubber bullets, and jammed cell phone signals.

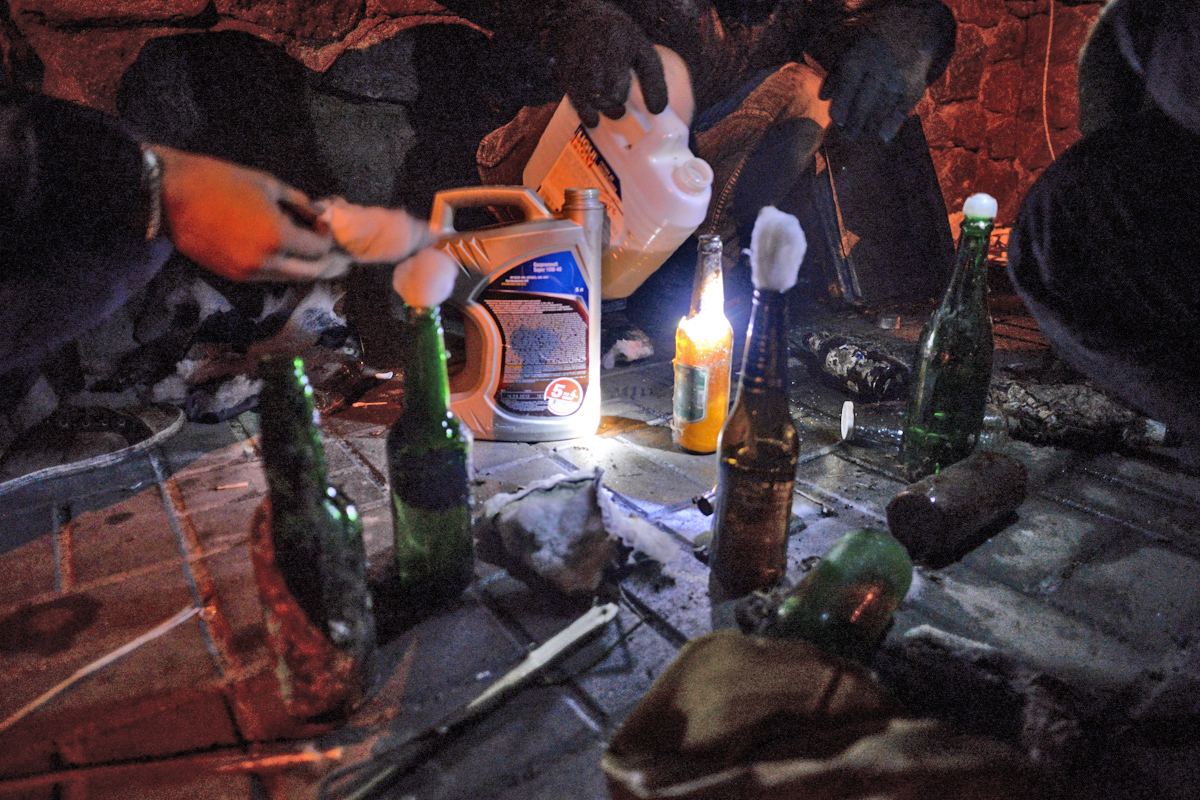
Demonstrators creating petrol bombs

By the evening, Vitali Klitschko had arranged a night-time meeting with President Viktor Yanukovych at his presidential mansion Mezhyhirya in an attempt to argue for snap elections to defuse the situation from escalating into further violence. The meeting ended with Yanukovych promising to resolve the crisis with a 'special commission' that included representatives of the administration (including the president), Cabinet of Ministers, and political opposition. Arseniy Yatseniuk took to the Euromaidan stage at about 9:30 p.m. to say that he had received a telephone call from the president telling him the administration wanted to start negotiations to end the political crisis. On Monday, 20 January, the commission was announced by Party of Regions MP Hanna Herman, but that it would convene without the President and be led by National Security and Defense Council secretary Andriy Klyuyev. (Note: Representatives from both sides named to the working group included Oleksandr Turchynov, Yuriy Lutsenko, Ruslan Koshulynskyi, Olena Lukash, Andriy Portnov, and Vitaliy Kovalchuk.) Opposition leaders refused to take part in the government's proposed commission provided the president abstained from them himself.

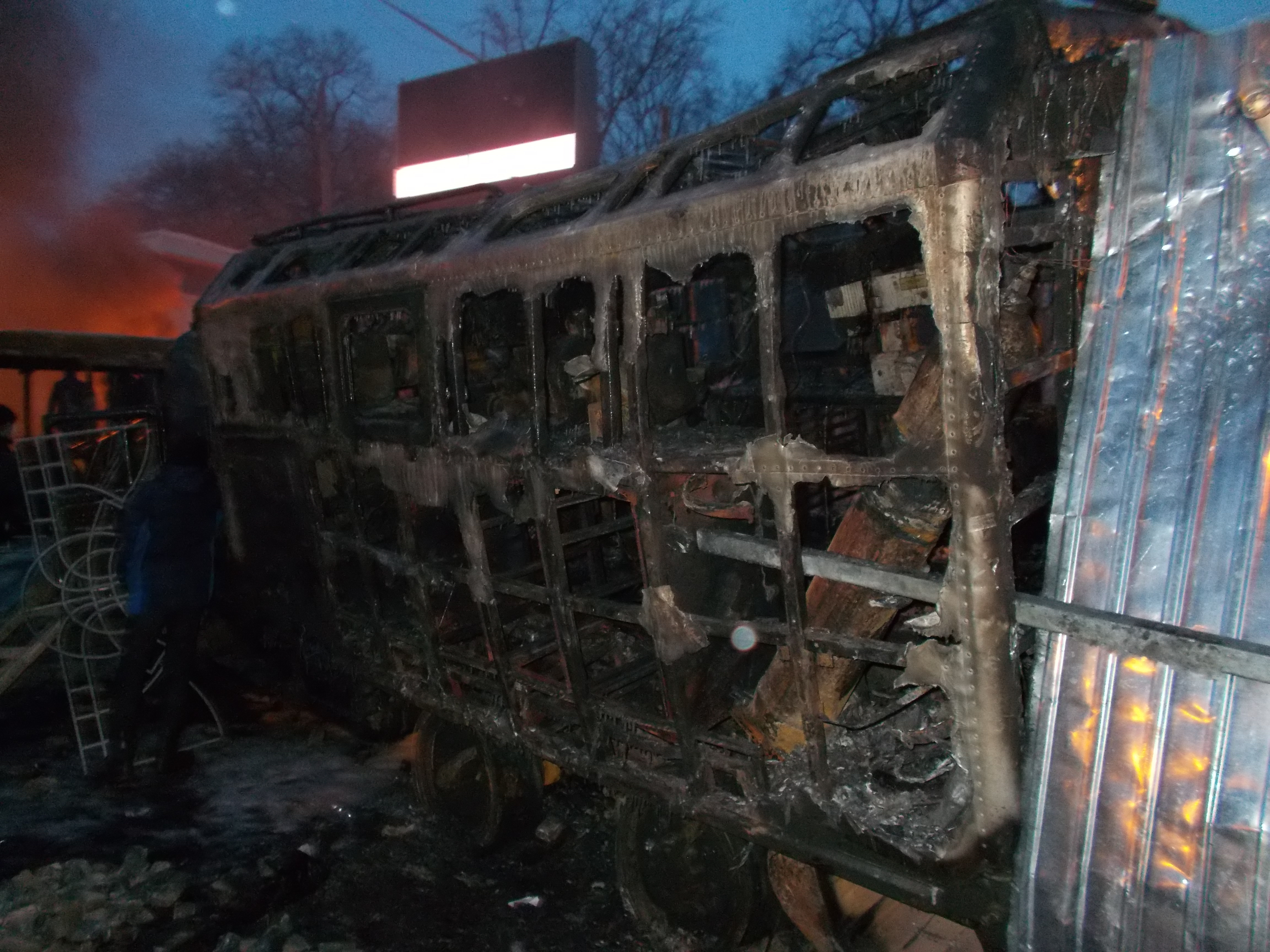
The icy, charred remains of the police blockade

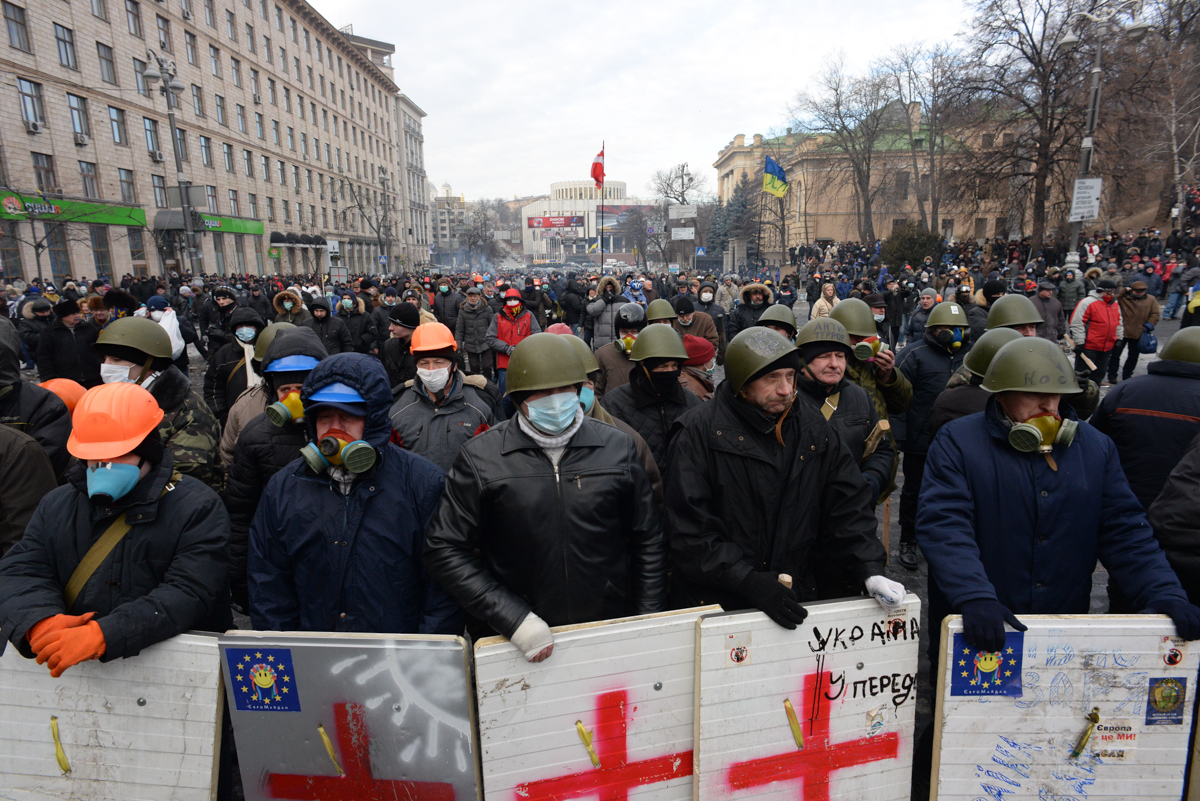
Helmeted protesters face off police

=== 20 January ===
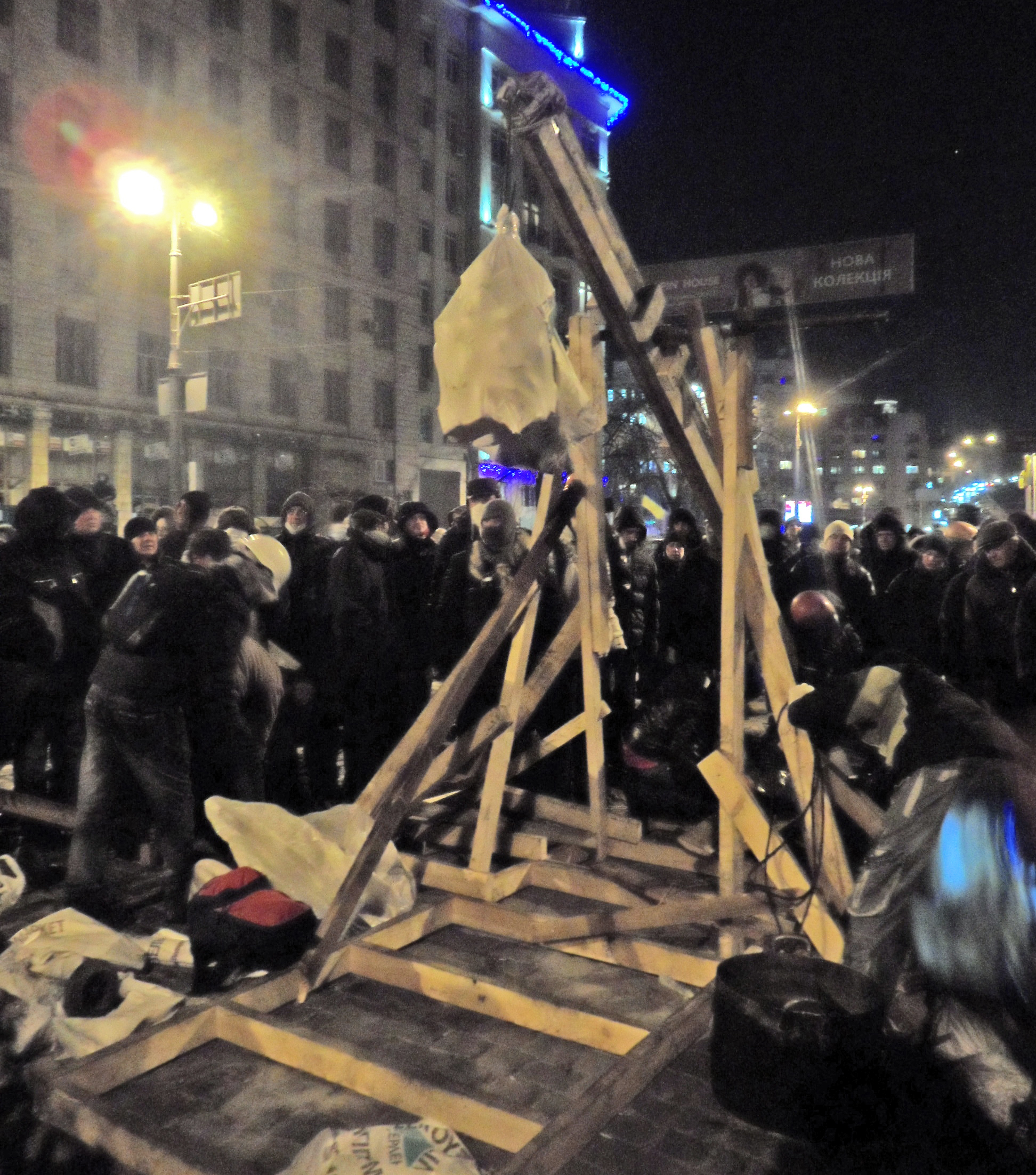
Trebuchet erected by protestors in Hrusehvskoho Street, Kyiv

Clashes continued into the second day, with thousands remaining on Hrushevskoho Street, continuing to exchange explosives and rocks with police. Of the 5,000 protesters present in the conflict area at the gates of the Dynamo Stadium near Mariinskyi Park, 200 were seen engaging the 500 riot police without stopping by the afternoon. Berkut riot police were filmed by Radio Liberty throwing rocks at protesters while making obscene gestures towards them. Later in the day, a group of protesters assembled an 8-foot high trebuchet to hurl rocks and other projectiles at police ranks. In retaliation, police lobbed flash grenades, rocks, and Molotov cocktails at protesters. Police snipers scattered over the rooftops in the area but were exposed with fireworks and lasers. By 10:45 p.m., the protestors near Dynamo Stadium numbered 10,000 and they continued to skirmish with thousands of police. According to the Ukrainian Interior Ministry, representatives of the opposition in the Ukrainian parliament were providing weapons to attack the police.

=== 21 January ===
In the twilight hours of 21 January, after the anti-protest laws had taken legal effect, President Yanukovych ordered a 'bloody crackdown', with police warning over loudspeakers that they might use weapons. Interior Minister Vitaliy Zakharchenko signed an executive order authorizing the use of physical force, special devices, and firearms. (Note: In response to the executive order, the head of the Ukrainian gun owners association, Georgiy Uchaykin, warned law enforcement agents that using firearms could lead to a point of no return. Uchaykin also stated that, according to the group's estimates, there are 400,000 legal arms owned by citizens in Kyiv and two million legal firearms owned in the country.)

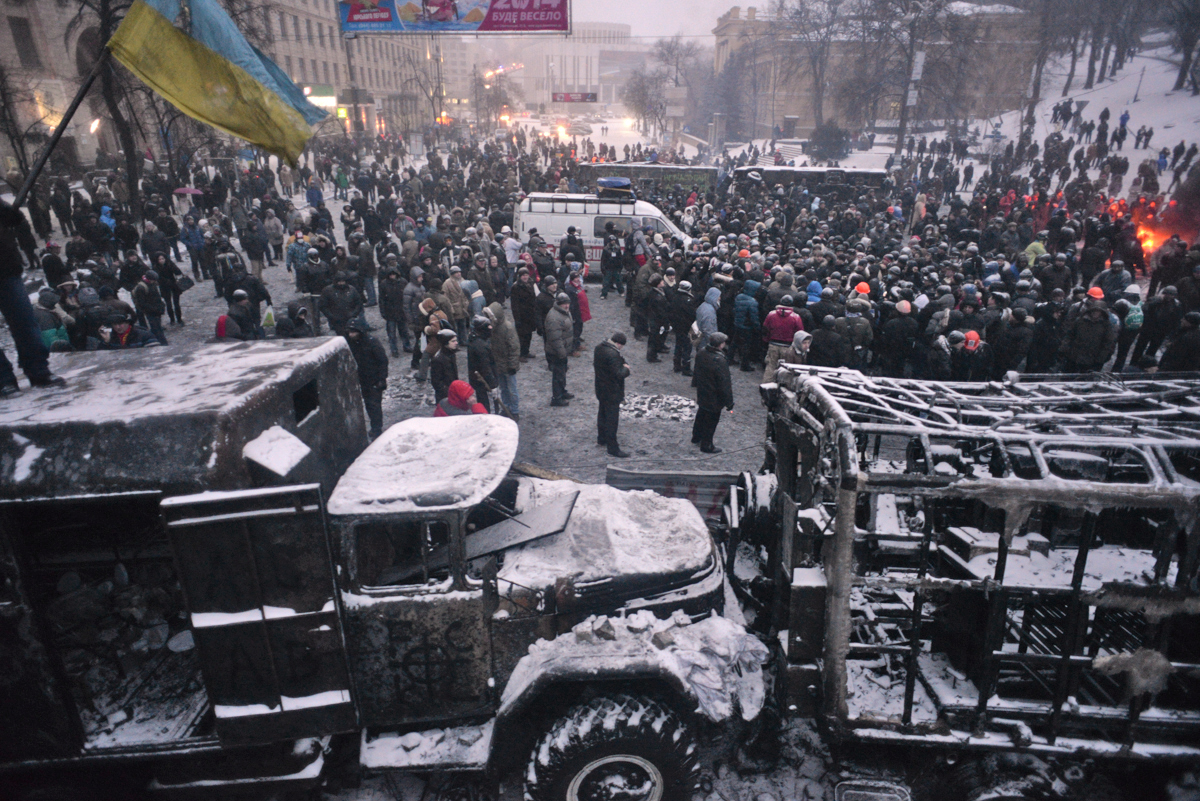
Hrushevsky Street, European Square in the background

Protesters received text messages from their service providers stating "Dear subscriber, you've been registered as participant in the mass disturbances." Responsibility for the messages was denied by the providers, two of which were owned by Russian companies. Experts suggested the government was behind the cell network actions.

Hundreds of armed "titushky" were reported by eyewitnesses in the vicinity, attacking protesters and passers-by, as well as smashing vehicles; some were reportedly transported into the city on the back of large trucks showing no license plates. Soon thereafter, they occupied many of the streets of downtown Kyiv. In one incident, Vitali Klitschko appeared on Franko Street: upon seeing him, the titushky fled. Klitschko then disarmed two of them who confessed to him that they were brought into the city from Kherson and ordered to smash cars and bring chaos to the city. Automaidan activists detained other titushky in downtown Kyiv who admitted they were promised a payment of UAH 220 ($27) to vandalize the city. A number of the titushky, who were apprehended by the protestors, were joined by political opposition leaders and brought to the opposition's headquarters at the Trades Union Building. They were questioned on live television, confessing their actions and job for the government to incite violence and anarchy. The rounding up of titushky was referred to as the titushky safari.

Berkut troops continued to throw molotov cocktails at protesters. Nearing 4 a.m., the bells of St. Michael's Cathedral sounded its bells in alarm, as it did on the night of 30 November police crackdown on the Maidan. Meanwhile, the standoff continued with police until noon, when a ceasefire began between roughly 500 police officers and 1,000 protesters and priests standing within the buffer.

=== 22 January ===
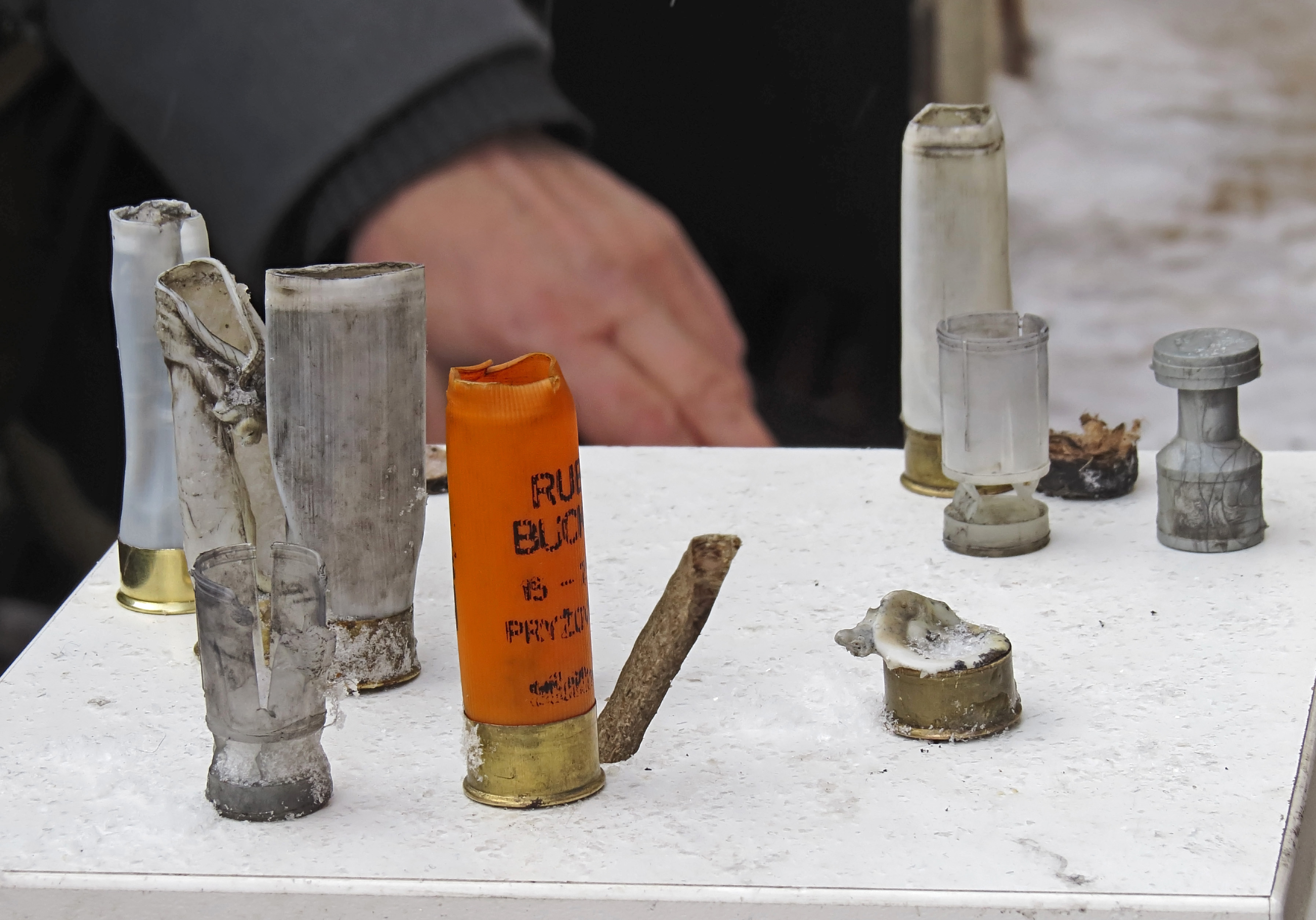
Shells and bullet of ammunition used by police

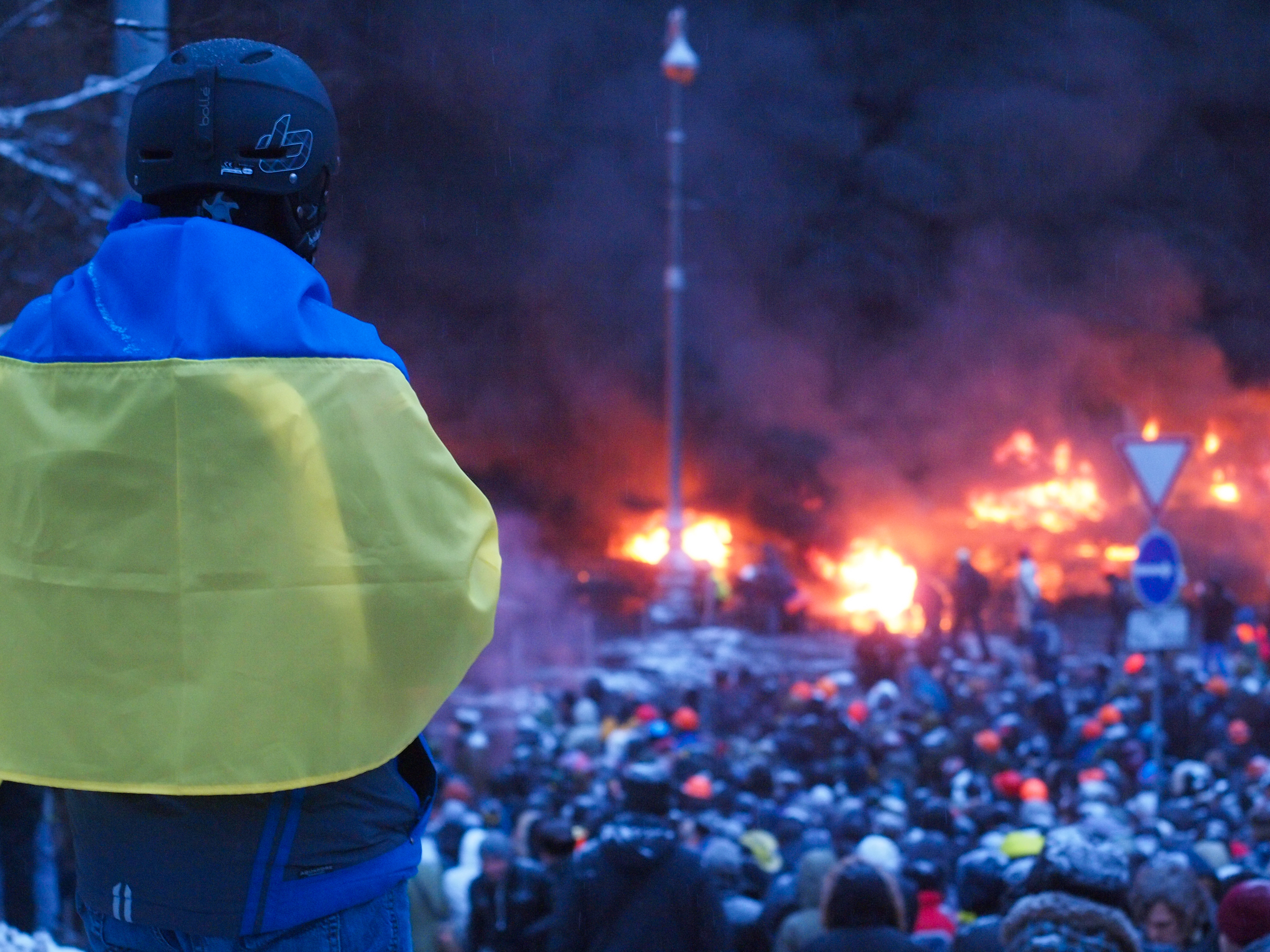
22 January saw the most violence of the Euromaidan movement to date.

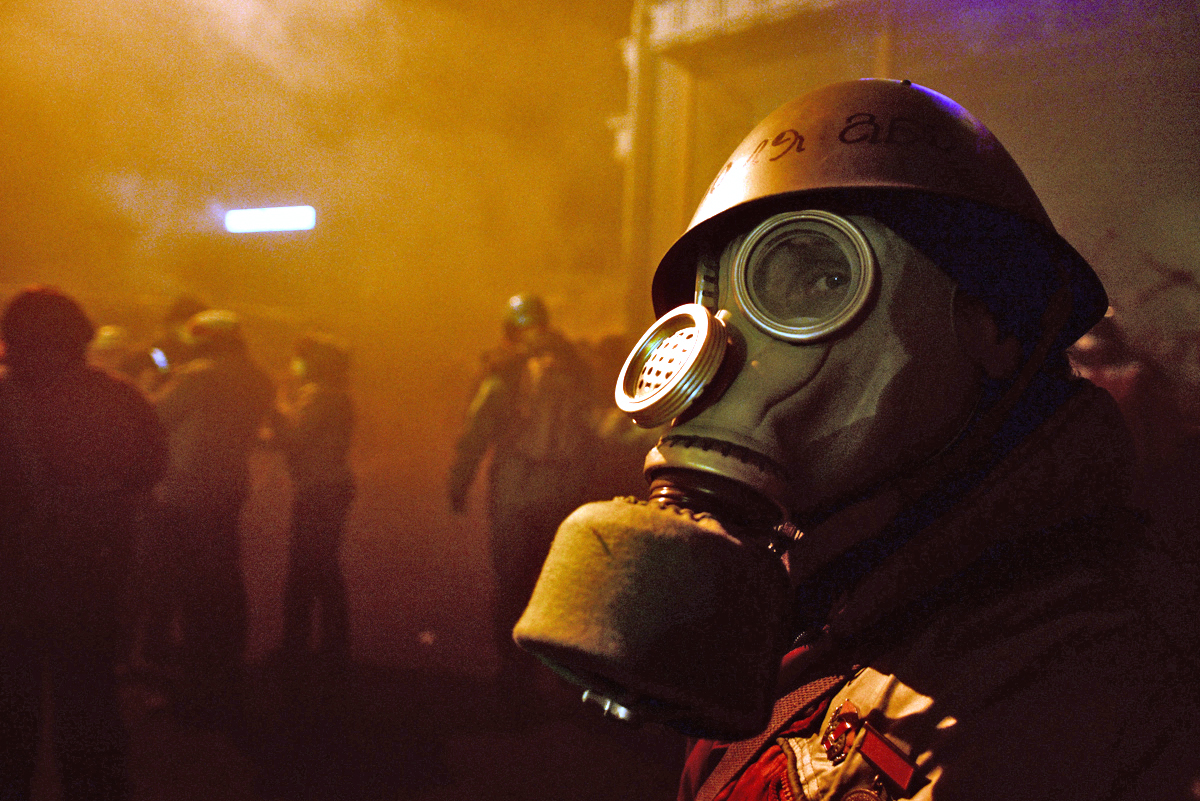
Many protesters wore gas masks amid the fire and gas as clashes continued on 21 January

At 6 a.m. local time on Unity Day, police shot and killed two protesters with live ammunition. Following news of the deaths, protesters retreated and dispersed from the vicinity of Dynamo Stadium. This allowed police to advance and retake the area for a brief period, before being pushed back once more by protesters.

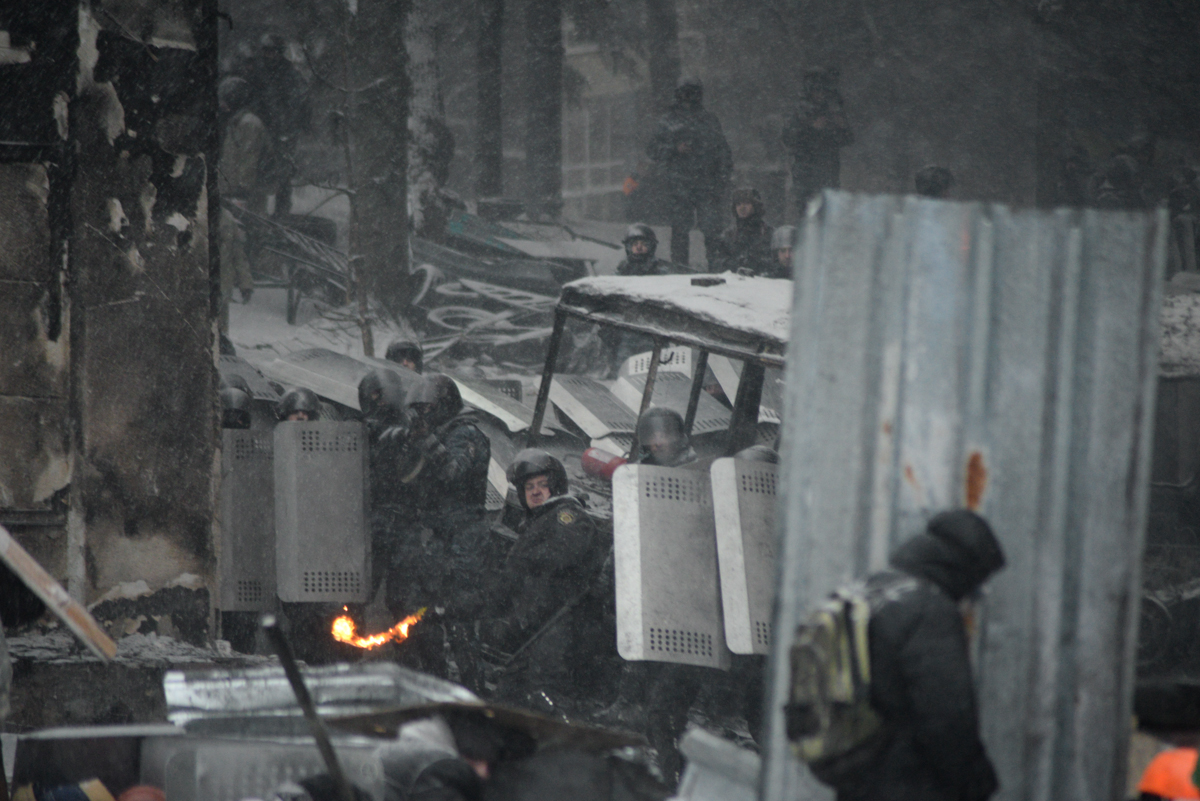
Berkut riot police shooting shotguns and throwing Molotov cocktails at protesters on 22 January

In response to the escalating violence, police were permitted by the government to increase measures to stopping the riots and protests. Police were now able to block roads to restrict access to the city, and allowed the use of water cannons against rioters regardless of air temperature (−10 C at the time of the announcement).

Police fired rubber rounds against journalists and cameramen that were present, and continued to throw molotov cocktails at protesters. Eyewitnesses said police were firing indiscriminately with rubber and regular bullets into the crowd periodically throughout the day, striking an unknown number of people. Hundreds were injured, and significant damage was done to cars on the scene that were set ablaze as in previous days. Journalists found numerous ammunition shells on the ground. Police and medics confirmed live rounds were used in the shooting deaths of two protesters earlier in the day. The prime minister denied that the police carried live ammunition. The co-ordinator of the protesters' medical corps said that five people had been killed, four from gunshot wounds and one in a fall. About 100 meters behind the front line, protesters erected a secondary barricade using cement planters and steel ripped from massive billboards, to slow police if they tried to chase protesters back to the square again. By evening 300 were injured and four dead by police gunfire.

=== 23 January ===
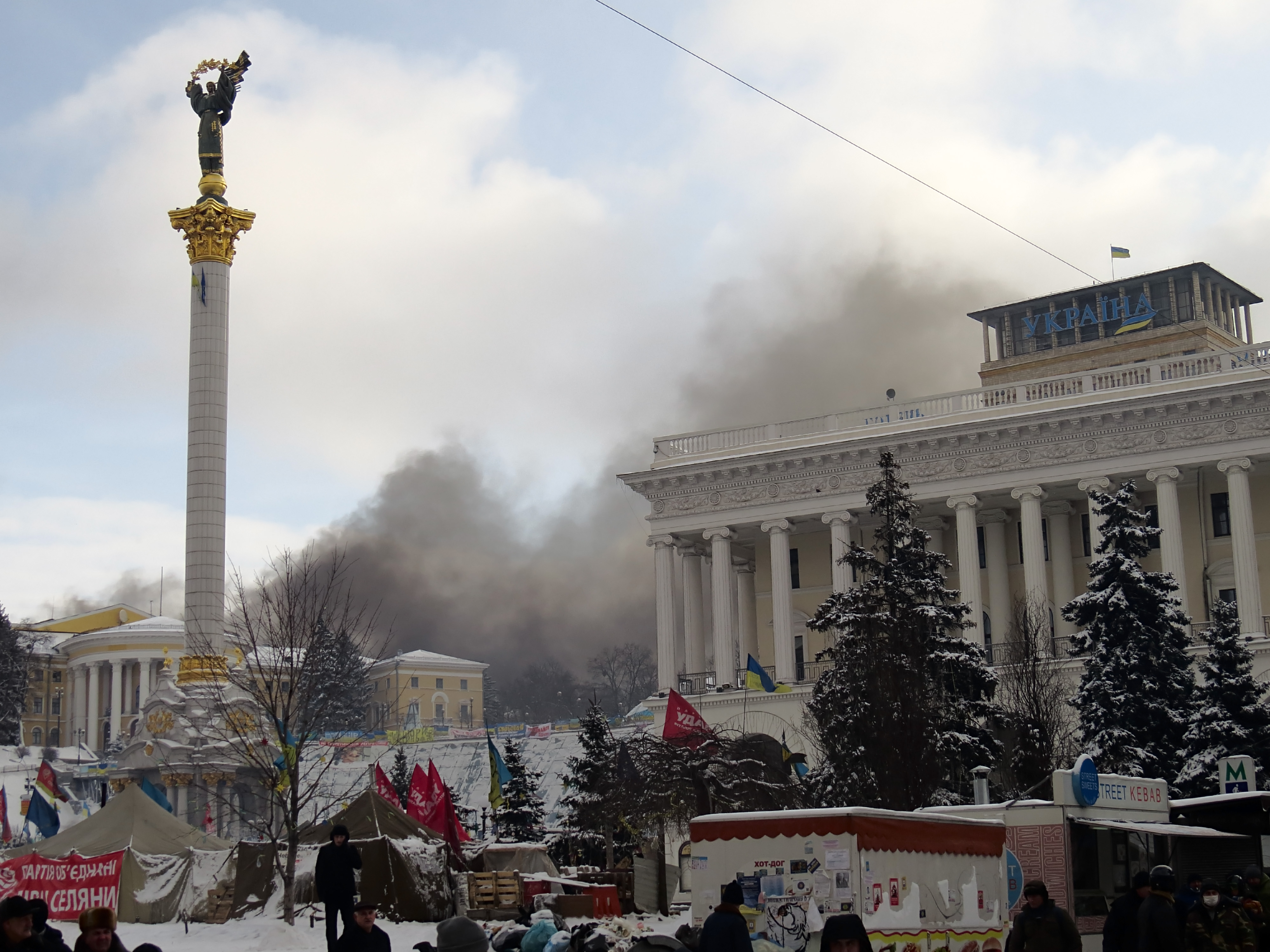
Smoke from Hrushevskoho street as seen from Maidan Nezalezhnosti

The truce between the two sides from the opposition's ultimatum to the government held, which expired at 8 p.m. Fire from the conflict zone spread and a shop was burned down on the first floor of the seven-story building, 40 square meters in area (at 2 Museum Alley). The fire was caused by the burning rubber tires that blocked the vulytsia Hrushevskoho. The burning tires were set to provide smoke screen for protesters.

Euromaidan activists documented police brutality with instances of sadism on multiple occasions from Berkut and servicemen of the Internal Troops of Ukraine, wherein officers assaulted activists and even random people and would humiliate them using excessive foul language, and force them to undress. In a video leaked to YouTube, Interior Ministry troops tortured and humiliated a Euromaidan activist on Hrushevsky street; he was stripped naked in the cold after being beaten, and photographed by officers. The video was in close proximity, indicating that it was leaked by an officer, a sign of discontent within police ranks. BBC News interviewed another protester who was photographing the Hrushevskoho Street protests, and then beaten and stabbed by police. On 23 January reports surfaced that riot police were engaging in the use of improvised grenades, taping nails and other shrapnel to conventional stun grenades. On 23 January 2014, Ministry of Internal Affairs of Ukraine officially apologized for the "unacceptable actions of people in police uniform" in the scandalous video filming a naked detainee.

Following peace talks with president Yanukovych, opposition leaders Klitschko and Tyahnybok addressed the crowd on Hrushevsky Street to announce a proposed truce with the government in exchange for the release of all arrested or detained protesters. The news was poorly received by the crowd, who chanted "liar!" and "Freedom or death!" and booed the leaders. Tyahnybok, who favored the truce, warned that the president stated his intentions to arrest 1,000 activists over the coming five days, and that repressions were ahead should a deal not be reached. Klitschko then called for a national strike, stating he was ready to sacrifice himself. A vote was then held with the crowd which resulted in cutting off talks with Yanukovych and enlarging the area of Euromaidan in Kyiv to include Hrushevsky Street.

=== 24–25 January ===
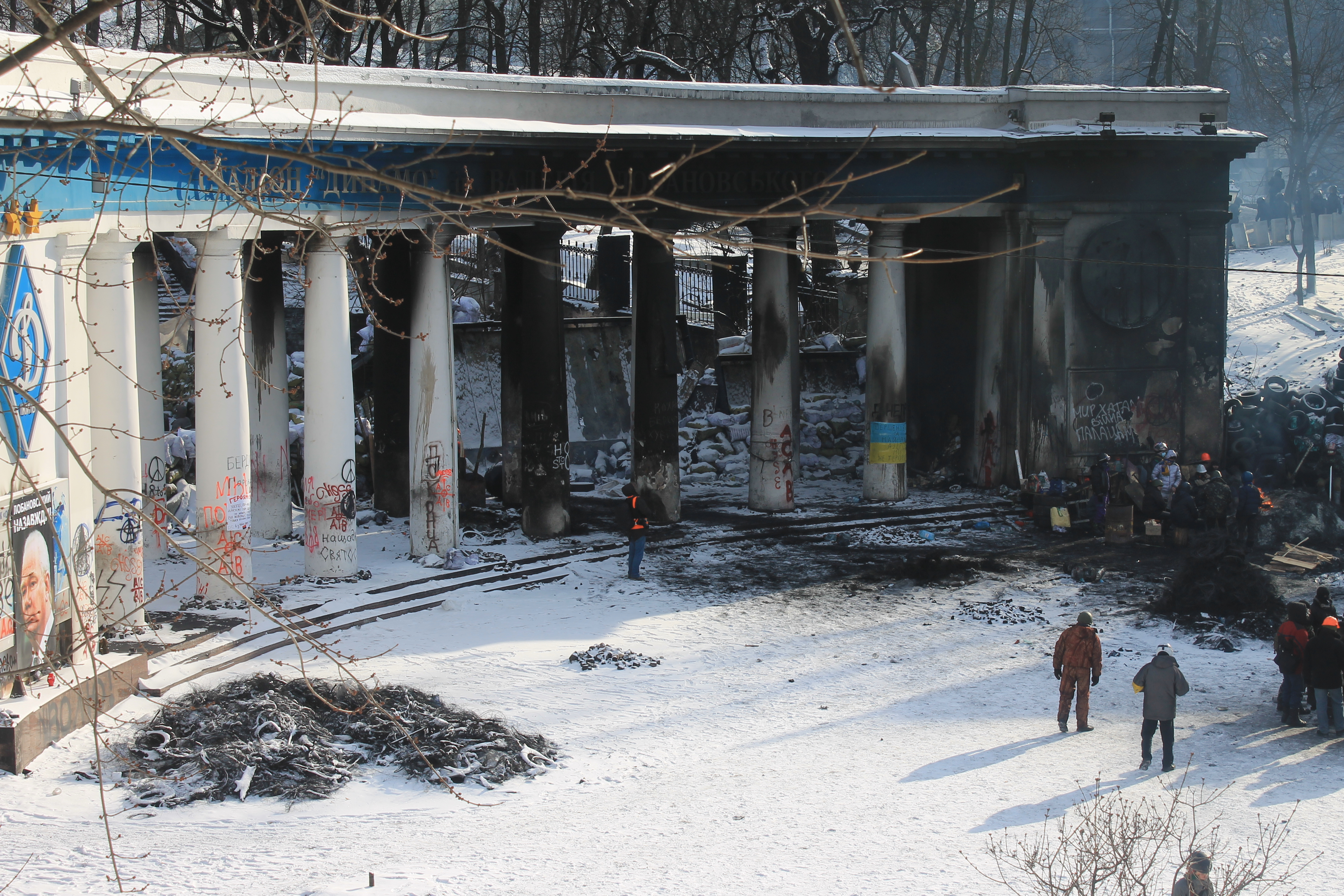
Dynamo Stadium entrance, where most of the conflict took place

Anti-government protesters built three new barricades on Hrushevskoho Street to protect the Euromaidan protest camp on Independence Square. Reports suggested a possible rift between the Euromaidan camp and the more radical participants on Hrushevsky Street.

Verkhovna Rada chairman Volodymyr Rybak stated on Rada TV that the issue of introducing a state of emergency would not be raised at 28 January extraordinary session of parliament since "The only issue that will be raised at the special session will be the current situation. The situation is very difficult, and we will consider the peaceful solution to the political crisis in Ukraine". Overnight, clashes flared at times but both sides held their positions and by 5 a.m. a temporary truce was made, and by morning the scene was relatively calm. However, by 10:30 a.m. fighting broke out. Fires from burning tires stretched 70 meters across the street, and flames five meters high divided the sides. Berkut police were reported to be firing on protesters once again blindly through the smoke, and using search lights to peer through.

Closing in on midnight, word spread that Internal Troops were occupying nearby Ukrainian House, strategically between Maidan and the Hrushevskoho barricades, and that they intended to flank their position. Protesters launched a pre-emptive strike on the building, in order to wrest control of the position. Protesters stormed the building, smashing windows, and lighting parts of the premises on fire. Protesters outside created a corridor for police to evacuate the building of their own volition, and the stand-off lasted for six hours until finally police surrendered the building after a peace was brokered by Vitali Klitschko. Anti-government protesters who occupied the building claimed to have discovered spent cartridges on the roof, and alleged that police who occupied the building until that morning might have used the rooftop to shoot at demonstrators on 22 January.

=== 28 January–17 February ===
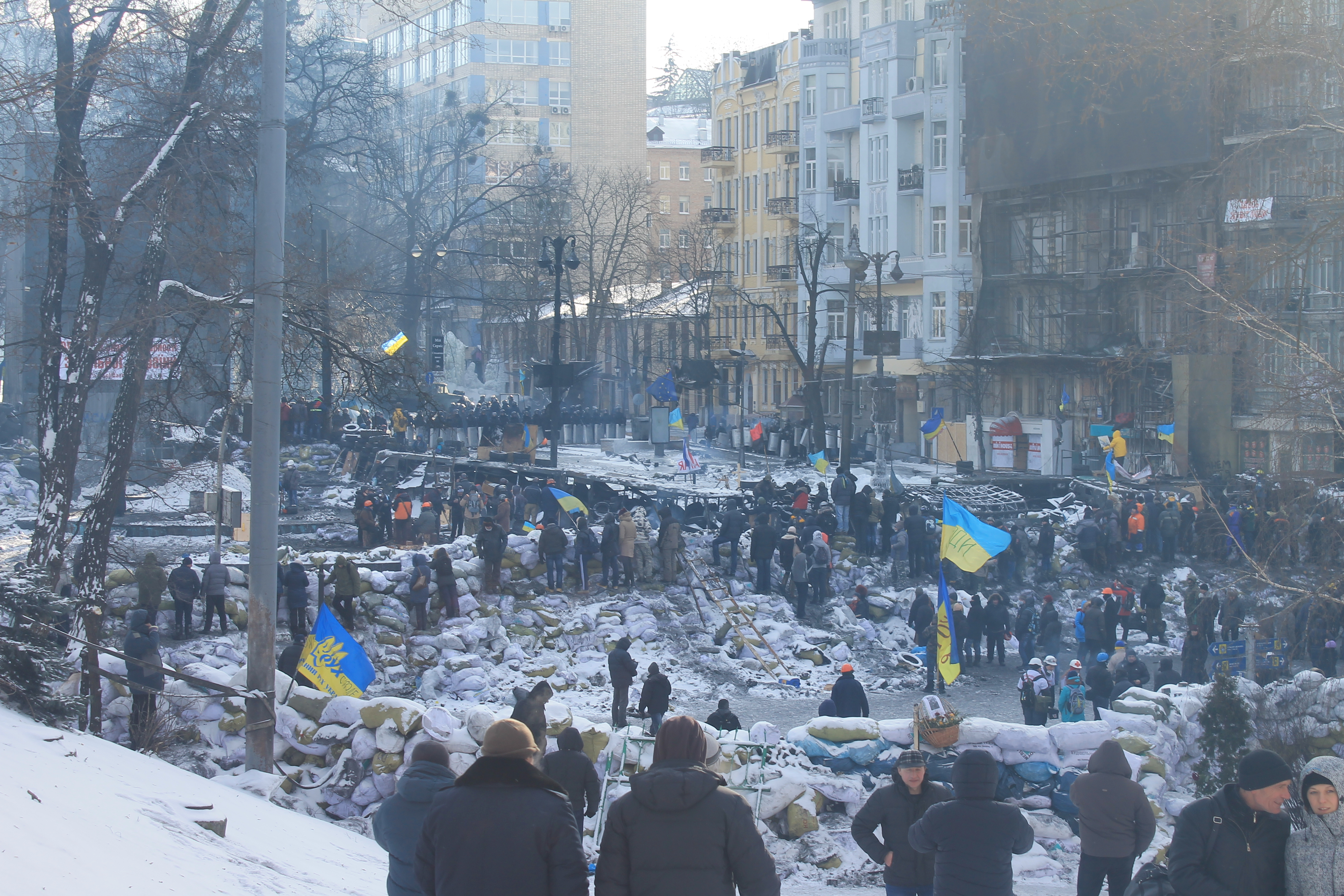
Barricades on Hrushevsky, 29 January

On 28 January, Prime Minister Mykola Azarov turned in his resignation to President Viktor Yanukovych, hours before a vote of no confidence could have removed Azarov from power. The resignation also removed the entire administration from power, which President Yanukovych confirmed by signing a decree dismissing the rest of Azarov's cabinet. However, Azarov and his government remained in office until a new election could be held.

Pro-government lawmakers joined with the opposition in Parliament to repeal nine of the 11 anti-protest laws which had triggered the violence. Yanukovych also proposed offering amnesty to the protesters if they abandoned their positions and dispersed. In addition, he promised to form a committee to propose revisions to the Ukrainian constitution that would weaken the powers of the president. Most spectators did not expect these concessions to be sufficient to satisfy protesters, many of whom were still demanding Yanukovych's resignation.

On 2 February, 5,000 gathered on Hrushevskoho to support the standoff. The faceoff was described by the Kyiv Post as "not likely to end soon."

On 6 February thousands (according to an UNIAN correspondent about three to four thousand) Ukrainian opposition activists, some carrying shields and baseball bats, marched from their camp on Maidan Nezalezhnosti to the Verkhovna Rada building (according to BBC News) in a show of force. According to (commandant of Euromaidan) Andriy Parubiy the march had a warning character, and if authorities did not consider the demands of Euromaidan, the actions would have a more decisive character "the next time".

On 14 February, Right Sector, in compliance with the amnesty law freeing protesters, agreed to restore traffic on Hrushevsky Street. All members of the UNSO left the scene. At the same time, the Right Sector demanded the immediate closure of all criminal cases against protesters, saying "Unless this is done as soon as possible, we reserve the right to act at our own discretion." The Maidan council also agreed to restore traffic; "This does not mean that we are surrendering the buildings, this does not mean that we are pulling down the barricades, this means that we will partially unblock Hrushevsky Street to restore traffic," Maidan activist of Andrew Dzyndzia said, and reiterated that protesters would remain on Hrushevskoho Street.

On 17 February an activist was stabbed in the lung after he crossed into the police-controlled side the barricades.

== Participants ==
=== Neutral parties ===
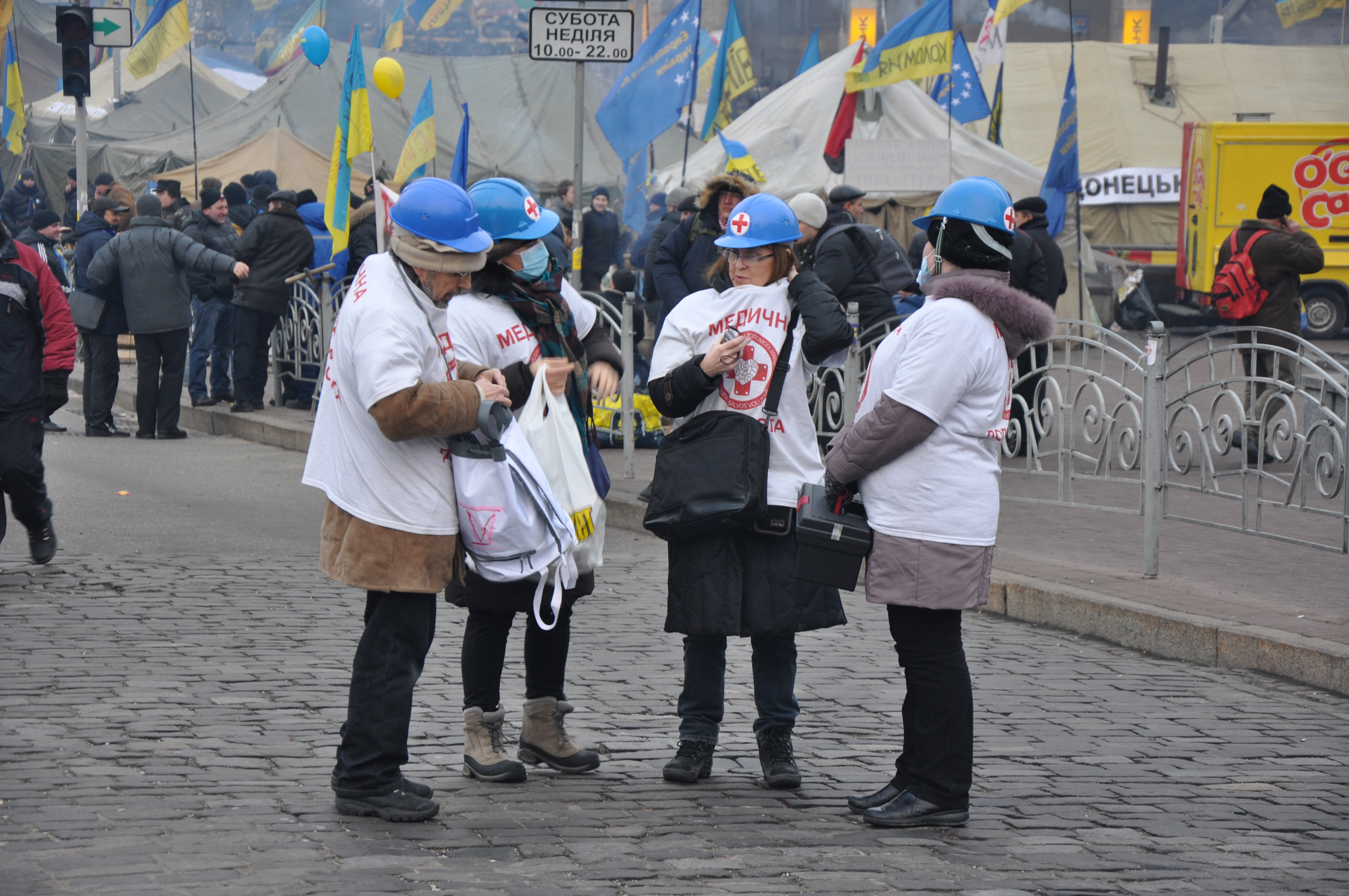
Euromaidan medics volunteers

There have been a number of participants not directly involved in the conflict, such as journalists and medics. Medics have worked on a volunteer basis providing urgent and first aid to wounded.

Numbers (19–21 January):

- Ukrainian Red Cross – 20+ volunteers (mobile group)
- Euromaidan medical service – ≈30 volunteers
- Ambulance vehicle – six vehicles (parked next to the European Square)

=== Self-defense units ===
Self-defense and creation of the barricades has been carried out by Right Sector, the UNA-UNSO, and other self-defense units. Notably, one such multi-ethnic unit is led by a Jewish man, and includes Georgians, Azerbaijani, Armenians, and Russians.

== Casualties ==
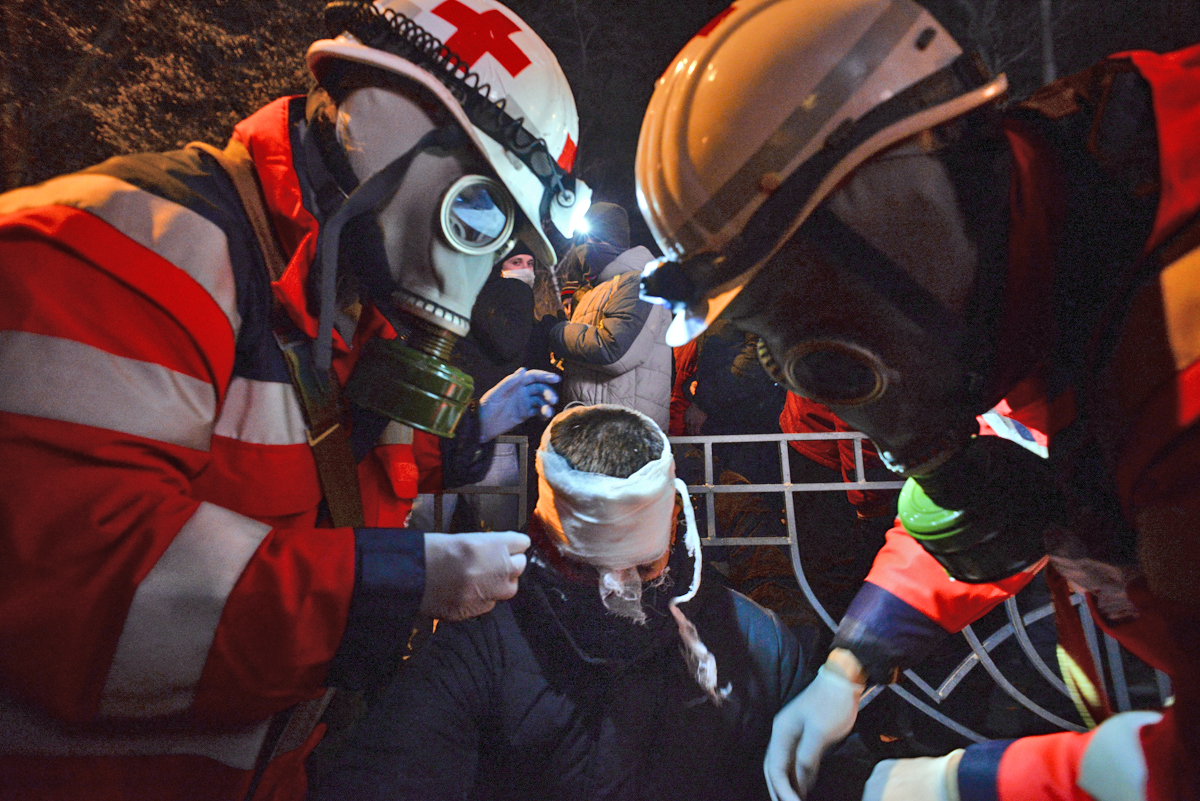
Red Cross medics in gas masks attend to the wounded

=== Protesters ===
According to medical workers on the ground: 300 were injured and treated on 20 January 250 on 21 January, more than 400 were injured on 22 January, and 70 on 23 January.

In addition, according to city medical officials, a total of 157 protesters have sought medical aid between 19 and 23 January, with 72 admitted to hospitals. The majority of complaints were made at the Maidan medical aid center which was set up near the barricades on Hrushevskoho Street on 19 January and most of those injured have avoided hospitals as those treated have been subject to arrest.

MP Lesya Orobets was targeted by police in the open and beaten in a politically motivated attack, along with three guards she was with. In an incident of cruel and unusual punishment, riot police detained two protesters, stripped them naked, doused them in water, and made them run back to Maidan on foot in the sub-freezing temperatures, while they were fired upon with rubber bullets. Two protesters have lost their vision.

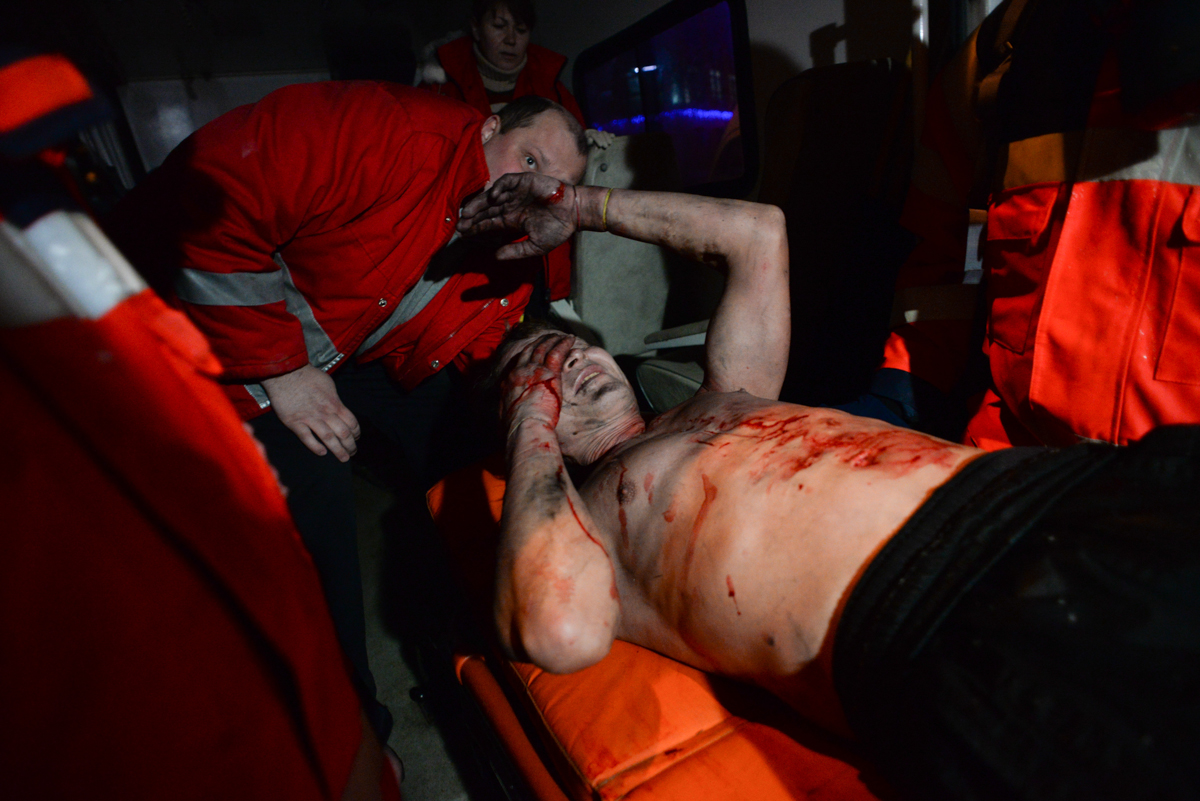
Ukrainian Red Cross Society volunteers administering first aid to a wounded Euromaidan protester

Several journalists claimed they were targeted by the police, including many who say they were deliberately fired upon. In total, 26 were injured, with at least two badly injured by police stun grenades; a further two were arrested by police. Over 30 activists were detained in total. By the 22nd, at least 42 more journalists were victims of clashes at Hrushevskoho Street on 22 January 2014.

==== Deaths ====
On 21 January, the initial report indicated the first death occurred after a 22-year-old man fell from atop the 13-metre high colonnade in front of Dynamo Stadium while confronted by Berkut police, and suffered fractures to his spine's cervical vertebrae. Reports of the incident debate on whether the man jumped from the building to flee the beating, fell, or if he was pushed by police. Later reports caused confusion after it was reported by medical staff that an additional man, 43 years old, fell from the roof, but survived; however, he fell fixing an antenna and was not on Hrushevskoho.

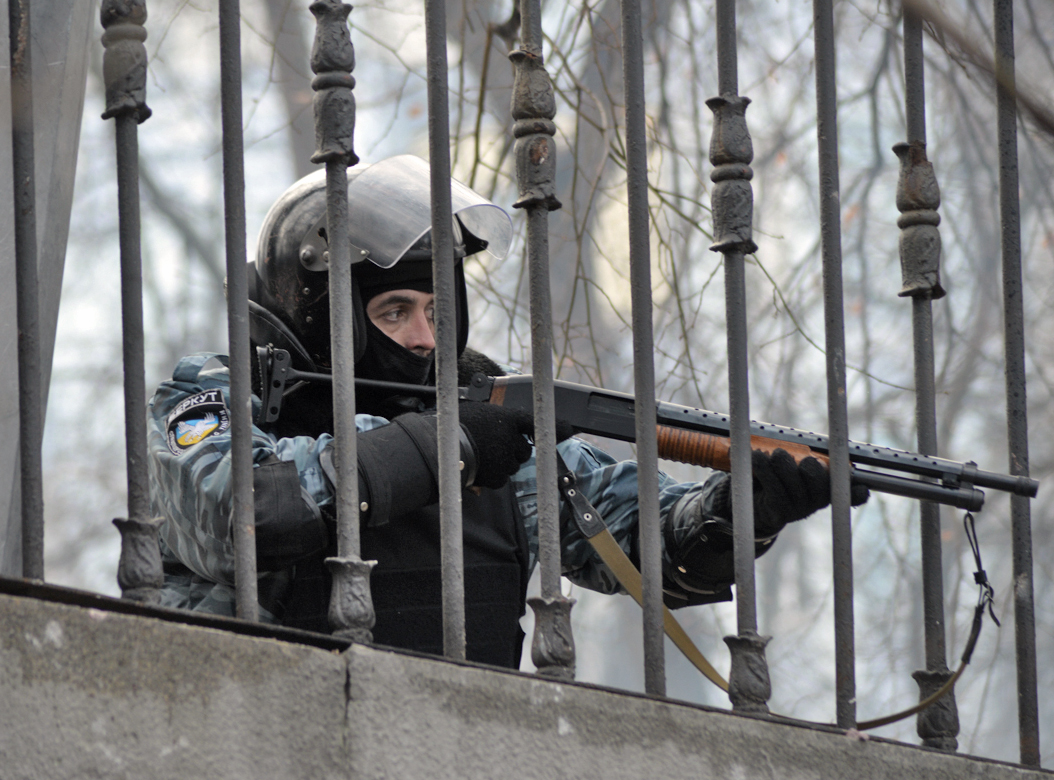
Berkut troop armed with a shotgun.

In the early morning of 22 January, police gunfire killed Serhiy Nigoyan, a 20-year-old ethnic Armenian Euromaidan participant from Dnipropetrovsk, while he was climbing the barricades in the conflict zone acting as security. It was reported he received four gunshot wounds, including to the head, and died on the scene before being taken to hospital.

Also killed was Belarusian citizen and UNA-UNSO member Mikhail "Loki" Zhyznewski, who was shot dead by police by a sniper rifle. Forensics experts found that Nihoyan was killed with buckshot and Zhyznevsky with a rifle bullet, while medics confirmed the bullet wounds to be from firearms such as the Dragunov sniper rifle (7.62 mm) and possibly a Makarov handgun (9mm).

Two other shooting victims were announced by Euromaidan medical service coordinators by Wednesday evening, based on TV footage in which police were seen dragging motionless bodies to their side of the fighting lines. These alleged deaths were not confirmed. On 25 January, Roman Senyk died in a Kyiv hospital after being wounded in the chest in the Hrushevskoho Street riots on 22 January.

A report published on 25 January by Armament Research Services, a specialty arms and munitions consultancy in Perth, Australia, says the mysterious cufflink-shaped projectiles presumably fired by riot police on Hrushevskoho Street at protesters during clashes this week are not meant for riot control, but for stopping vehicles, busting through doors and piercing armor. The bullets, writes Jenzen-Jones, who specializes in Eastern bloc weapons, are special armor-piercing 12-gauge shotgun projectiles, likely developed and produced by the Spetstekhnika (Specialized Equipment) design bureau, a facility located in Kyiv and associated with the Ministry of Internal Affairs.

On 28 January, 52-year-old Bohdan Kalyniak died in hospital of pneumonia as a result of police water cannons being used against protestors in sub-freezing temperatures during clashes on Hrushevskoho Street.

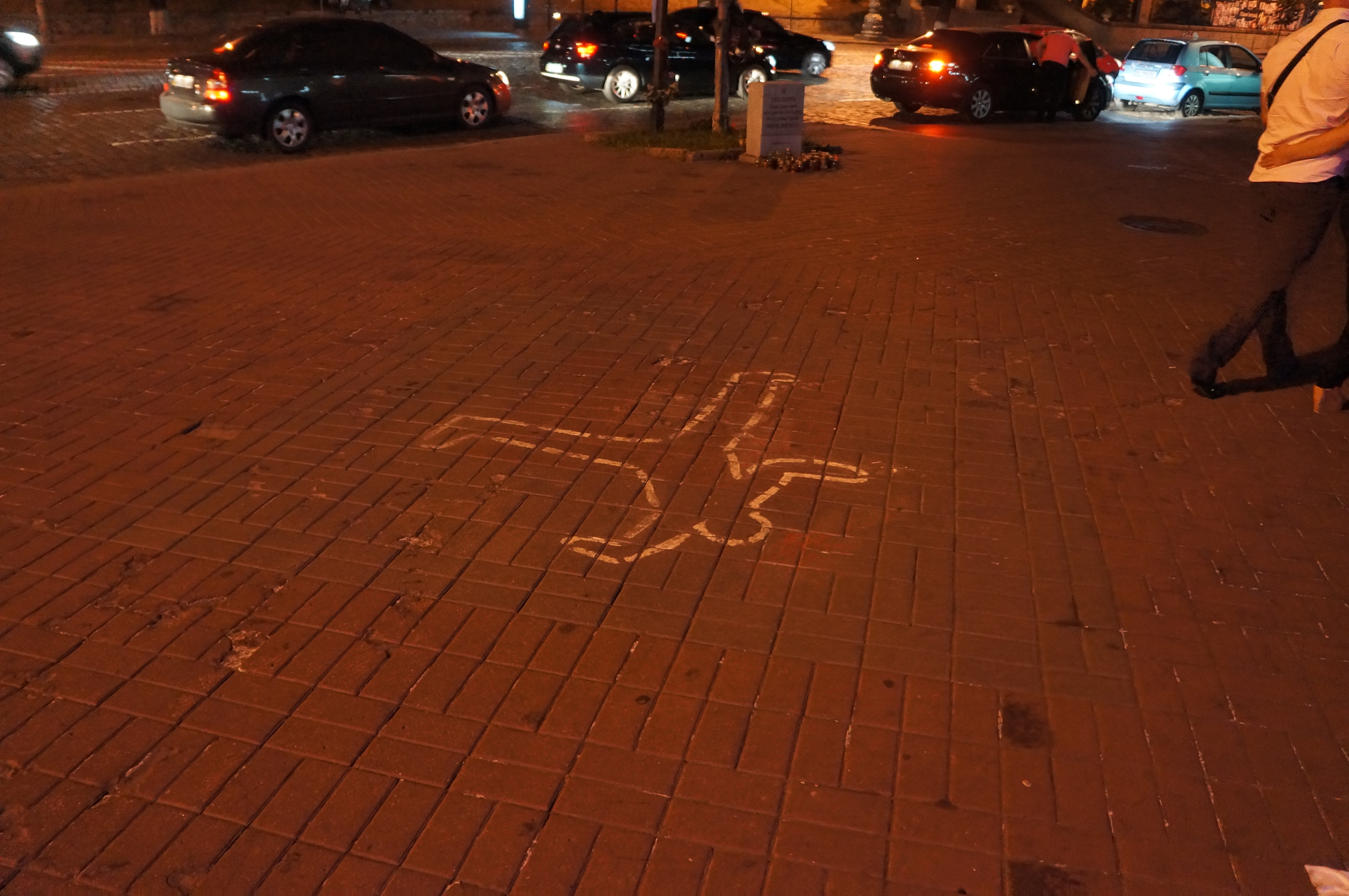
Silhouette of a victim painted on a sidewalk in Hrushevskoho Street, one year after the clashes

On 29 January two men, one younger and one older, were shot on Hrushevskoho Street and brought to a Kyiv hospital. The latter died from the gunshot wounds the following day.

=== Police ===
According to reports from the Interior Ministry, at least 100 riot police were injured in the clashes of 19 January with 61 of those officers being hospitalized. According to the Interior Ministry's official website, demonstrators captured and beat one Berkut riot-police officer who was taken to the opposition-occupied House of Trade Unions and later sent to a hospital for treatment. Videos show protesters throwing molotovs at riot police officers, injuring some of them.

On 23 January 235 officers were reported injured with 104 hospitalized. By 25 January, the MVS reported that 285 police officers were injured, 104 of which were hospitalised, and 1,340 had fallen ill (primarily from pneumonia and hypothermia).

== Domestic responses ==
- Vitali Klitschko blamed the government for having the blood of protestors on his hands after he did not receive an answer for demands for snap elections and repeal of the "criminal laws."
- The agitators were described as young men who are 'tired of waiting for action' and impatient with both the regime's actions and opposition's inaction. Ukrainian media linked the action to a hitherto little-known right-wing youth group called "Right Sector". Arseniy Yatsenyuk claimed the actions of the radical protesters were orchestrated by the government to create a pretext for further repressions. Other commentators said that rioters appeared to have the support of the majority of protesters on the scene and did not represent a minority of the Euromaidan movement.
- Ukraine's Prosecutor General Viktor Pshonka blamed the situation on "two months of rhetoric from irresponsible politicians, their shallow promises and impunity for crimes." Meanwhile, the Interior Ministry stated that they reserved the right to use even greater force, defending their use of rubber ammunition, and outright denied the use of water canons on protesters. According to the Ukrainian Interior Ministry "the police did not act as harshly as they are allowed to in such a situation by the law" and they would have "had the right to use firearms." The Party of Regions thanked law enforcement officers who were on duty and in a statement, considered "criminal and immoral the actions of the opposition, which organized the riots on Hrushevskoho Street and on European Square." The party called for a 'nationwide dialogue', and it reminded the opposition of their "responsibility for the European future of Ukraine," and Regions members in Luhansk called for the President to declare a state of emergency in the region. Following the deaths attributed to police that occurred on 21–22 January, President Yanukovych released a statement saying he felt "deep regret" over Wednesday's deaths and condemned the violence "provoked by political extremists."
- Party of Regions MP Arsen Klinchayev stated during a memorial service in Luhansk for those killed on 22 January by police, "These people were against the government. Nobody has the right to use physical force against police officers. And then they have their sticks, then stones, then something else. The police have the right to defend their lives. So I think it right that these four people were killed. Moreover, I believe that you need to be stricter."
- Prime Minister Mykola Azarov in an interview with BBC denied police being armed and denied any being located on the roofs of buildings, and that the shooting of protesters must have been done by provocateurs attempting to escalate violence. Later, Party of Regions MP Evheny Balitsky accused NATO of deploying snipers to kill the victims.

== International reactions ==
=== Supranational and international organizations ===
- The President of the European Commission, José Manuel Barroso, in a phone call to President Yanukovych on 23 January, said that "if the situation in Ukraine is not stabilised, the EU would assess possible consequences for bilateral relations".
- The presidents of the Nordic Council and the Baltic Assembly issued a joint statement condemning "the use of force and violence in Kyiv to disperse protesters who over the last weeks have expressed their support for Ukraine's integration into the European Union."
- The foreign ministers of the Visegrád Group issued a joint statement condemning the protest killings, stating "the killing of demonstrators which cannot be justified by any reason." Additionally, the group wrote that "the fundamental rights of Ukrainian citizens – including freedom of assembly, freedom of expression and media – must be fully respected and protected."

=== States across the world ===
- The Foreign Minister of Austria, Sebastian Kurz, said after learning of the killings on 21 January that "it is shocking that young demonstrators had to pay with their lives today, simply because they demanded more democracy and expressed their annoyance about the government's refusal to enter into dialogue. My deepest sympathies go out to the families and friends of the victims." Kurz called on all parties to practice restraint, dialogue, and called for a full investigation into the protester deaths.
- The Bulgarian Ministry of Foreign Affairs issued a statement on 22 January, expressing its "grave concern" over the developments in Ukraine, stating that Bulgaria expected "a full and impartial investigation and punishment of those responsible for the deaths of demonstrators," and regretted that Ukrainian authorities had not "taken into account" EU calls to reform "the adopted restrictive laws [to be] in line with international norms." Bulgaria "urge[s] the government of Ukraine to respect the fundamental rights of the citizens – the freedom of expression, press freedom and the right of assembly. We call [on] the opposition forces to restrain and cautiously take actions."
- The Canadian Minister of Foreign Affairs, John Baird, described the protester killings as "disturbing," believing the situation in Ukraine "obviously requires condemnation and response" from the international community. "All options are on table. I think we need to be very clear that we can't remain silent, but I think it will be absolutely essential for us to consult with like-minded [partners], particularly the United States and European Union." Canada summoned the Ukrainian ambassador to the Department of Foreign Affairs on 22 January, warning the Ukrainian envoy that the Canadian government was now "actively considering" sanctions and other options based on the events.
- The Czech Minister of Foreign Affairs, Jan Kohout, expressed shock and dismay at both the violence in Kyiv and legal action against protesters, stating, "I am turning to the President of Ukraine to work for the abolition of the legislation drastically restricting the freedom of expression and assembly whose passing last week resulted in the stepping up of the demonstrations." Kohout also stated that "[the Czech Republic] has long supported the transformation process in Ukraine and the Ukrainian democratic activists and it will continue to do so."
- The French Minister of Foreign and European Affairs, Laurent Fabius, summoned the Ukrainian ambassador to explain the killings, describing the summoning as "a gesture to show that there is condemnation on France's part...There were orders to fire on the crowd, which is clearly unacceptable."
- The Chancellor of Germany, Angela Merkel, expressed "outrage" over 22 January killings. "We expect the government in Ukraine to ensure democratic freedoms, notably the right to demonstrate, the protection of lives and the end of the use of force," said Merkel. "We are greatly worried, and not only worried, but also outraged at the way laws have been pushed through that call these freedoms into question." Later on 24 January, the Foreign Office summoned the Ukrainian ambassador to explain the German government's stance, saying that it "expect[ed] Ukraine's ambassador to pass on this message without delay to his government, the president and the prime minister."
- The Georgian Ministry of Foreign Affairs released a statement on 22 January, "express[ing] its deep concern over the death and injury of citizens during the recent events in Ukraine, and conveys its condolences to the families of the victims." The Georgian government declared that it "respects the right of each and every country to define its foreign policy priorities, but, at the same time, expects every country to comply with the principles of freedom of assembly and freedom of speech and expression."
- The Italian Minister of Foreign Affairs, Emma Bonino, released a statement on 24 January, stating that "those responsible for the recent deadly incidents must be identified and the emergency legislation recently adopted repealed, in order to ensure demonstrators the peaceful exercise of fundamental rights such as freedom of association, expression and assembly." Additionally, Italy summoned the Ukrainian ambassador the same day to express its concerns over the political situation.
- The Irish Minister of European Affairs, Paschal Donohoe, called on 23 January for dialogue between the Ukrainian government and opposition, but strongly condemned the government's crackdown. "The message that Ireland is sending to President Viktor Yanukovych and everyone involved is that democratic dialogue is needed to resolve the current impasse. The Ukrainian government must ensure that this violence is brought to an end. Violence cannot be a solution to this or any situation. I witnessed first hand, during a recent trip to Kyiv, the utmost strain and pressure on the people there." Donohoe also revealed that the Irish government had summoned the Ukrainian ambassador, demanding the "immediate end to the violence and for serious talks" between the government and opposition.
- Latvia summoned the Ukrainian ambassador to the Ministry of Foreign Affairs on 22 January, noting that the Latvian government was "alarmed over the escalation of the situation in Ukraine and strongly condemned violence." The ministry released A statement on the following day, "call[ing] upon all the forces and sides in Ukraine to act responsibly, avoiding measures that could further aggravate the situation in the country and lead to an even greater bloodshed."
- The Prime Minister of Poland, Donald Tusk, recommended the "responsible" use of sanctions following the deaths on 22 January. Tusk declared his support for a "joint action across the European Union to events in Ukraine and most importantly, a prudent and responsible use of tools that are at the disposal of the international community...Therefore, together with our partners, we will be looking for such a course of action, which will bring the desired effect...to stop the violence and repression against citizens and participants in the democratic opposition in Ukraine." The Polish Ministry of Foreign Affairs additionally summoned the Ukrainian ambassador to express Poland's "deep concern" over Ukraine's anti-protest legislation and the resulting crackdown.
- The Portuguese Ministry of Foreign Affairs released a statement on 21 January, stating that it "strongly condemns all acts of violence and calls for an inclusive dialogue among all parties expressing concern on the political situation," as well as criticizing the "legislative amendments that impose restrictions on the rights of association and free speech, condemning the right of dissent [that] are contrary to the international obligations of the country."
- The Russian Minister of Foreign Affairs, Sergey Lavrov, stated in a 21 January press conference that "We are confident that the internal problems of any state, including Ukraine, must be resolved through dialogue in the constitutional, legal framework, without any outside meddling."
- The Slovak Minister of Foreign Affairs, Miroslav Lajčák, said on 24 January that "when blood was shed, a red line was crossed...This is not an academic issue for us. We have very actively been supporting a European way for Ukraine." Lajčák further intensely criticized President Yanukovych, remarking that "[t]here is a saying that if a leader does not want to listen to his people, he will hear from them. That is exactly what is happening in Ukraine." Slovak Prime Minister Robert Fico announced on 22 January his shock over the violence in Kyiv, condemning the deadly use of force by the Ukrainian security services as "unacceptable," as well as declaring that, as Ukraine's immediate western neighbor, Slovakia and Ukraine "have many things in common." Fico further elaborated by saying, "I appeal to all protesters to refrain from violence. Equally, however, I urge the Ukrainian authorities and all those involved to respect the right of citizens to assemble."
- The Slovenian Ministry of Foreign Affairs issued a statement on 22 January, "condemn[ing] in the strongest terms the escalating violence between protesters and police in Kyiv," urging all sides to refrain using force. The ministry expressed its condolences for the families of the victims.
- The Swedish Foreign Minister Carl Bildt has said that after the deadly violence, "it won't be business as usual" as regards to Ukraine–European Union relations. The Swedish minister also stated that "there is no question that the responsibility lies with the regime".
- David Lidington, British Minister for Europe, stated in a press release that "all sides have a responsibility to refrain from violence and avoid actions that might inflame the situation further, and particular responsibility rests with the Ukrainian government and President Yanukovych."
- The United States, in response to 22 January killing of protesters, revoked the visas of unspecified Ukrainian officials who were linked to the violence. Volodymyr Oliynyk and Olena Anatoliivna Bondarenko were named among those barred from the U.S.

=== Activists ===
- On 23 January supporters picketed the Embassy of Ukraine in Moscow holding a banner "Ukraine, we are with you" and singing the Ukrainian national anthem. Eleven participants were detained by police. The previous support action was held in Moscow on 2 December.
- On 23 January supporters in Minsk, Belarus, laid flowers and showed solidarity with Euromaidan and those who died near the Ukrainian embassy. Police dispersed the crowd and questioned participants for their passport information.
