= Human rights in Uzbekistan =

Human rights in Uzbekistan have been described as "abysmal" by Human Rights Watch, and the country has received heavy criticism from the UK and the US for alleged arbitrary arrests, religious persecution, and torture employed by the government on a regional and national level. Amnesty International stated that freedoms of expression, association, and peaceful assembly continue to be restricted, and that same-sex relations are illegal.

== Overview ==
Human Rights Watch stated that "Uzbekistan's record of cooperation with United Nations human rights mechanisms is arguably among the worst in the world. For the past 12 years, it has ignored requests for access by all 11 United Nations human rights experts, and has rejected virtually all recommendations that international bodies have made for human rights improvements." IHF has expressed profound concern about "wide-scale violation of virtually all basic human rights."

Furthermore, religious freedom is one of the country's greatest issues.

The US Department of State has designated Uzbekistan a "Country of Particular Concern" for the religious persecution practiced in the country, and have defined Uzbekistan as "an authoritarian state with limited civil rights." Human Rights Watch, however, says that the US government has "resisted imposing any serious policy or consequences for Uzbekistan's dismal rights record, viewing Tashkent as a key ally along the Northern Distribution Network (NDN) that it is using to withdraw supplies from the war in Afghanistan".

A map of incarceration rates by country

According to reports, the most widespread violations of human rights are torture, arbitrary arrests, and various restrictions of freedoms of religion, of speech and press, of free association and assembly. The reports maintain that the violations are most often committed against members of religious organizations, independent journalists, human rights activists and political activists, including members of banned opposition parties. In 2005, Uzbekistan was included into Freedom House's "The Worst of the Worst: The World's Most Repressive Societies".

The official position of the Uzbek government is summarized in a memorandum titled "The Measures Taken by the Government of the Republic of Uzbekistan in the Field of Providing and Encouraging Human Rights" and amounts to the following. The government does everything that is in its power to protect and to guarantee the human rights of Uzbekistan's citizens. Uzbekistan continuously improves its laws and institutions in order to create a more humane society. Over 300 laws regulating the rights and basic freedoms of the people have been passed by the parliament. For instance, an office of Ombudsman was established in 1996. On 2 August 2005, President Islom Karimov signed a decree that will abolish capital punishment in Uzbekistan on 1 January 2008.

Craig Murray, British ambassador 2002–2004, investigated human rights abuses, and, when his bosses at the Foreign and Commonwealth Office ignored his reports, he went public, bringing international attention to the situation. He was dismissed from his post, but continued to speak out against human rights abuses in the country. He also claimed there was extraordinary rendition by the United States of America to Uzbekistan, with surreptitious use of information obtained under torture as a result. Murray was removed from his post in October 2004, shortly after a leaked report in the Financial Times quoted him as claiming that MI6 used intelligence provided by Uzbek authorities that was acquired through torture. The FCO denied there was any direct connection and stated that Murray had been removed for "operational" reasons. In his book Murder in Samarkand (2006), Murray speculates that his anti-torture memos caused two problems for the US and UK governments. First, the CIA's extraordinary rendition program was secretly using Uzbekistan as a destination country to fly people to be tortured. Second, the transcripts of the torture sessions were then shared with Britain's MI6 because of the UK-US intelligence sharing agreements of World War II. By objecting to the UK's acceptance of CIA torture-obtained information, he was interfering with the secret rendition program as well as threatening the MI6's relationship with the CIA.

The 2005 civil unrest in Uzbekistan, which resulted in several hundred people being killed is viewed by many as a landmark event in the history of human rights abuse in Uzbekistan, A concern has been expressed and a request for an independent investigation of the events has been made by the United States, European Union, the UN, the OSCE Chairman-in-Office and the OSCE Office for Democratic Institutions and Human Rights. The government of Uzbekistan is accused of unlawful termination of human life, denying its citizens freedom of assembly and freedom of expression. The government vehemently tried to rebuff the accusations, maintaining that it merely conducted an anti-terrorist operation, exercising only necessary force. In addition, some officials claim that "an information war on Uzbekistan has been declared" and the human rights violations in Andijan are invented by the enemies of Uzbekistan as a convenient pretext for intervention into the country's internal affairs.

The Constitution of Uzbekistan asserts that "democracy in the Republic of Uzbekistan shall be based upon common human principles, according to which the highest value shall be the human being, his life, freedom, honor, dignity and other inalienable rights".

Uzbekistan has abolished the death penalty. The abolition, initiated by the August 2005 decrees of President Karimov, became effective on January 1, 2008. Capital punishment has been substituted by longer term deprivation of liberty and life sentencing (see Death penalty in Uzbekistan).

In 2015 Human Rights Watch reported that:

Uzbekistan's atrocious rights record did not discernibly improve in 2014. Authoritarian President Islam Karimov, who entered his 25th year in power, continued to employ a widespread security apparatus to monitor and crack down on activities of real and perceived opponents. Authorities repress freedom of expression in all forms and do not allow any organized political opposition, independent media, free trade unions, independent civil society organizations, or religious freedoms. Those who attempt to assert rights, or act in ways deemed contrary to state interests, face arbitrary detention, lack of due process, and torture. Forced labor of adults and children continues.

=== Freedom of religion ===
Religious literature which is not state-approved, including the Bible, is often confiscated and destroyed.

Forum 18, a human rights organisation based in Norway, has documented raids by Uzbek police in which participants in unregistered religious services were beaten, fined, threatened and intimidated. In August 2005 one of the organisation's reporters was detained and deported by the authorities at Tashkent airport in Uzbekistan.

The Office of Public Information of Jehovah's Witnesses has documented several cases with imprisonment for teaching religion. The Barnabas Fund also states that Pastor Dmitri Shestakov was imprisoned for 4 years for Christian activities.

=== Torture ===
U.S.-based Human Rights Watch said in November 2007 that Uzbek prison authorities routinely beat prisoners and use electric shocks, asphyxiation and sexual humiliation to extract information and confessions. According to a forensic report commissioned by the British embassy, in August 2002 two prisoners were boiled to death. According to a report by the Human Rights Watch, Muslim prisoners have been tortured for praying. The United Nations Committee Against Torture described "widespread, routine torture and ill-treatment" in Uzbekistan.

=== Forced labour ===
Forced child labour in cotton production is a practice in Uzbekistan, and the Uzbek government has long employed children as young as 9 in the industry. From a very young age, children are reared to look forward to harvest time, known as "pahta" and to enjoy harvesting the cotton as an "opportunity for them to contribute to their nation's prosperity". Many farmers are forced to produce cotton but the state reaps the profits for exporting it. If government workers and professionals refuse to work they can be penalised with a lower income and the child workers can be beaten.

Anti-Slavery International describes the conditions of the cotton industry in the country as "appalling". The Cotton Campaign was established in 2007 in Washington, DC to improve human rights in Uzbekistan. They allege that the Karimov administration "detains, tortures, and exiles Uzbek citizens who call for recognition of human rights, violating their human rights and denying freedoms of speech and the press" and that the forced labour system in the country "violates the human rights of Uzbek citizens and condemns future generations to a cycle of poverty" and "blatantly violates the international convention against trafficking in persons and the Universal Declaration of Human Rights." The Cotton Campaign actively seeks for government change in respecting human rights and to permit the International Labour Organization to monitor production in the country.

As a result of the human rights reports of misconduct in Uzbekistan, several companies such as H&M, Tesco, IKEA, Adidas and Marks & Spencer have detached themselves and have proclaimed that they are doing all they can to avoid and boycott the use of Uzbekistani cotton in their products. Josefin Thorell, a spokeswoman for IKEA said "We do all we can to ensure that Uzbek cotton is not used in our products, but the traceability process for the cotton industry is not robust. In the case of, for example, Bangladesh, where much of the cotton used in manufacturing is traditionally from Uzbekistan, IKEA suppliers are required to buy from India." In October 2014 Tesco signed the Responsible Sourcing Network's pledge not to source cotton from Uzbekistan. Giles Bolton, Responsible Sourcing Director at Tesco, said: "Tesco was one of the first retailers to ban the use of Uzbek cotton in the supply chain in 2007, and we are now very proud to be a signatory to the Cotton Pledge. Eliminating cotton picked with forced labor is a critical step in the responsible sourcing process."

In response to international pressure and the threat to the industry from the boycotting of its cotton, conditions in the country are gradually improving. In early 2012, Uzbekistani Prime Minister Shavkat Mirziyayev (who has since succeeded Karimov to the presidency of Uzbekistan) issued a decree banning children from working in the cotton fields. However, many professionals including teachers, college lecturers, doctors and nurses are still forced to work in the fields at times of harvest. Now outlawed, the defoliant Butifos is responsible for exceptionally high infant mortality and birth defect rates among children born to women who work in the cotton fields.

In December 2014, the List of Goods Produced by Child Labor or Forced Labor issued by the U.S. Department of Labor reported that the cotton industry is still employing underage children and indentured labourers.

Uzbek human rights activist Elena Urlaeva, who was arrested and detained in psychiatric hospitals in 2015, 2016 and 2017 for shedding a light on forced labour in the cotton industry, played a major role in the campaign to boycott Uzbek cotton.

=== Women's rights ===
==== Compulsory sterilization ====
It is reported that Uzbekistan has been pursuing a policy of forced sterilizations, hysterectomies and IUD insertions since the late 1990s in order to impose population control.

==== Domestic violence ====
Domestic violence against women is a serious problem in Uzbekistan. A survey by UNICEF found that 69.6% of women agreed that a husband is justified to beat or hit his wife under certain circumstances (including 61.2% if the wife goes out without telling him, and 47.9% if she argues with him).

=== Internet ===
Uzbekistan's "freedom on the net status" is "not free" in the 2012 and 2013 Freedom on the Net reports from Freedom House. Uzbekistan maintains the most extensive and pervasive filtering system among the CIS countries and has been listed as an Internet enemy by Reporters Without Borders since the list was created in 2006. The OpenNet Initiative found evidence that Internet filtering was pervasive in the political area and selective in the social, conflict/security, and Internet tools areas during testing that was reported in 2008 and 2010.

Uzbekistan prevents access to websites regarding banned Islamic movements, independent media, NGOs, and material critical of the government's human rights violations. Some Internet cafes in the capital have posted warnings that users will be fined for viewing pornographic websites or website containing banned political material. The main VoIP protocols SIP and IAX used to be blocked for individual users; however, as of July 2010, blocks were no longer in place. Facebook was blocked for a few days in 2010.

Internet censorship in Uzbekistan increased following the events of the Arab Spring in 2011. Additional websites are blocked, contributors to online discussion of the events in Egypt, Tunisia, and Bahrain have been arrested, and news about demonstrations and protest movements have been blocked. The BBC website was unblocked in late 2011, but since January 2012, specific pages dealing with the Arab Spring have been inaccessible. ISPs and mobile phone operators are required to report mass mailings of "suspicious content" and to disconnect networks upon authorities’ requests.

The principal intelligence agency in Uzbekistan, the National Security Service (SNB), monitors the Uzbek segment of the Internet and works with the main regulatory body to impose censorship. As all ISPs must rent channels from the state monopoly provider, available evidence strongly suggests that Internet traffic is recorded and monitored by means of a centralized system. SNB officers frequently visit ISPs and Internet cafés to monitor compliance.

In 2014, the entire country's internet and mobile messaging networks were stopped over a three- to four-hour window for 'urgent repairs' coinciding almost precisely with national university entry exams.

== History ==
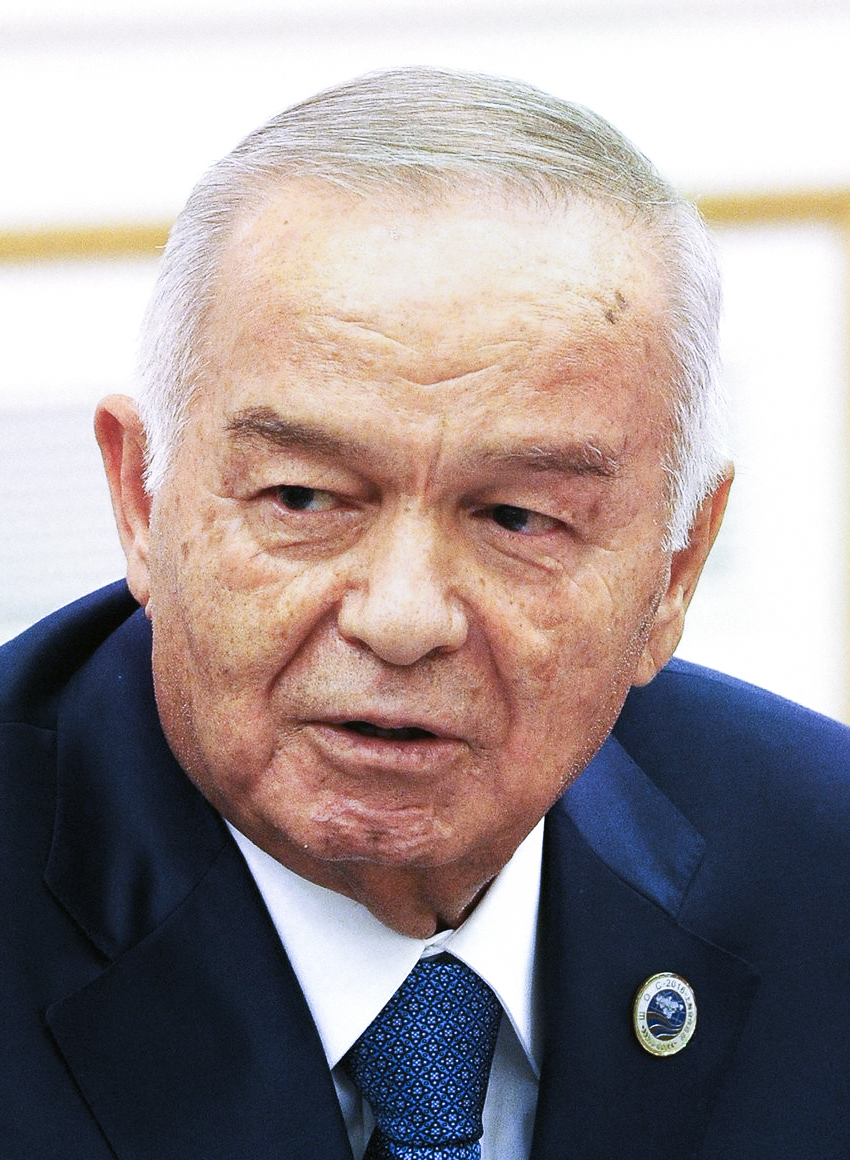
Islam Karimov, president of Uzbekistan from 1991 to 2016

=== 2004 ===
The U.S. State Department's 2004 report on human rights in Uzbekistan found limited improvement. While no detainees died while in police custody, police negligence led to the deaths of four prisoners. National Security Service officials "tortured, beat, and harassed" citizens but human rights activists were allowed to investigate instances in which prisoners died and activists suspected torture as the cause of death. Security forces did not arrest journalists and three were released. Some non-governmental organizations, most notably the Open Society Institute, were not allowed to register with the government, and thus prevented from work in Uzbekistan.

=== 2005 ===
In 2005 the Uzbek government arrested Sanjar Umarov, an opposition politician, and raided the office of Sunshine Uzbekistan, an opposition political alliance. United States Senators Bill Frist and Richard Lugar introduced a resolution calling on the Uzbek government to make sure Umarov "is accorded the full measure of his rights under the Uzbekistan constitution to defend himself against all charges that may be brought against him in a fair and transparent process, so that individual justice may be done".

Tashkent citizens found the body of Kim Khen Pen Khin, a Pentecostal, on 11 June 2005. According to one another Pentecostal church member police treated church members worse than animals, several beating three of them. One, a pastor, had a concussion. Police initially accused Kural Bekjanov, another church member, of murdering Khin, but dropped the charges against him two days later. When police discovered his religion they broke his ribs and put needles under his fingernails to get him to renounce Christianity.

In August the Uzbek government detained Elena Urlayeva, a human rights activist, on charges of disseminating anti-government leaflets. In October a Tashkent court ordered Urlayeva to undergo psychiatric treatment in a mental health facility in a legal preceding in which neither she nor her lawyer were present. The government released Urlayeva on 27 October after officials abused and beat her.

The Immigration Service and Border Guards of the Government of Uzbekistan detained Igor Rotar, a human rights activist who works for Forum 18 and Radio Free Europe, on 11 August. Rotar's plane took off from Bishkek, Kyrgyzstan and arrived at Tashkent Airport at 10:25AM. Amnesty International condemned the incident, saying his "detention is part of a wave of intimidation and harassment of journalists and human rights defenders by the Uzbek authorities that escalated following the events in Andijan in May this year". Holly Cartner, Europe and Central Asia director for Human Rights Watch, said, "We are deeply concerned for Rotar's safety. He should be allowed to contact his organization and a lawyer, and should be released immediately."

=== 2006 ===
An unknown individual strangled Karina Rivka Loiper, secretary to Rabbi Abe David Gurevich, and her mother on 12 June in Tashkent. While police ruled it a robbery, the Federation of Jewish Communities of the Commonwealth of Independent States called for an investigation. Jewish community leaders said a spokesman for the Committee on Religious Affairs warned them against "politicizing" Loiper's death.

On 29 April 2006, human rights workers Azam Farmonov and Alisher Karamatov were arrested and allegedly tortured by state security forces. They are currently serving prison terms on charges of extortion that Amnesty International, Human Rights Watch, and Front Line have condemned as politically motivated.

On 25 October the Karshi-Khanabad court fined two Baptists from Ferghana and Tashkent US$438 while four others were given smaller fines for participating in unregistered religious activity after police raided a Baptist church in the city. 30 police raided a Pentecostal church in Tashkent on 13 November. Another raid on 27 August yielded 38 unapproved pieces of literature.

Uzbek state television played a show entitled "Hypocrites" on 30 November and 1 December, in which Protestant missionaries were said to have engaged in plagiarism and drug use. The program said, "On the pretext of financially helping people in need, [missionaries] instill their own teachings in these people's minds". Converts are "zombies". Begzot Kadyrov, specialist of the State's Religious Affairs Committee, commenting on the program, said, "Turning away from the religion of one's ancestors is not only one's own mistake but could also lead to very bad situations between brothers, sisters and between parents and their children". Converts to Christianity are "lost to family, friends and society".

=== 2007 ===
The International Helsinki Federation for Human Rights (IHF), Human Rights Watch, and the International Federation for Human Rights International asked the UN Human Rights Council in Geneva to continue monitoring human rights in Uzbekistan on 22 March 2007. Aaron Rhodes, executive director of the International Helsinki Federation, criticized the suggestion, saying, "What that would really imply would be that the United Nations would reward the Uzbek government for its repressive policies and its refusal to cooperate with the Council. If the Human Rights Council can't take up the problems in Uzbekistan, then what is it for?".

==== Umida Niazova case ====
Uzbek police detained Umida Niazova, a human rights activist who worked for local group Veritas and Human Rights Watch in Tashkent, Uzbekistan, on 21 December 2006 in the Tashkent airport. Fearing criminal prosecution, she left the country for Kyrgyzstan, returning on the advice of her lawyer who said that no criminal case would be brought against her. At the border, she was arrested and stood trial on charges of illegally crossing the border, smuggling and distribution of illegal content. Holly Cartner, a director at Human Rights Watch alleges that "Niazova was threatened with these charges for... her human rights work".

On May 1, 2007, an Uzbek court convicted Niazova and sentenced her to seven years in prison, on charges of "preparing or disseminating material containing a threat to security and order". The Uzbek government alleged she was storing on her laptop literature by an Islamist extremist group. Niazova had written news stories about deadly protests in Andijan, Uzbekistan in 2005. The Organization for Security and Co-operation in Europe (OSCE), the United States government, and Human Rights Watch criticized the sentence. On May 8, she confessed in court and she was given a suspended sentence and released.

== Historical situation ==
The following chart shows Uzbekistan's ratings since 1991 in the Freedom in the World reports, published annually by Freedom House. A rating of 1 is "free"; 7 "not free".^{1}

Historical ratings

Year	Political Rights	Civil Liberties	Status	President^{2}
1991	6	5	Partly Free	Islam Karimov
1992	6	6	Not Free	Islam Karimov
1993	7	7	Not Free	Islam Karimov
1994	7	7	Not Free	Islam Karimov
1995	7	7	Not Free	Islam Karimov
1996	7	6	Not Free	Islam Karimov
1997	7	6	Not Free	Islam Karimov
1998	7	6	Not Free	Islam Karimov
1999	7	6	Not Free	Islam Karimov
2000	7	6	Not Free	Islam Karimov
2001	7	6	Not Free	Islam Karimov
2002	7	6	Not Free	Islam Karimov
2003	7	6	Not Free	Islam Karimov
2004	7	6	Not Free	Islam Karimov
2005	7	7	Not Free	Islam Karimov
2006	7	7	Not Free	Islam Karimov
2007	7	7	Not Free	Islam Karimov
2008	7	7	Not Free	Islam Karimov
2009	7	7	Not Free	Islam Karimov
2010	7	7	Not Free	Islam Karimov
2011	7	7	Not Free	Islam Karimov
2012	7	7	Not Free	Islam Karimov
2013	7	7	Not Free	Islam Karimov
2014	7	7	Not Free	Islam Karimov
2015	7	7	Not Free	Islam Karimov
2016	7	7	Not Free	Islam Karimov
2017	7	7	Not Free	Shavkat Mirziyoyev
2018	7	6	Not Free	Shavkat Mirziyoyev
2019	7	6	Not Free	Shavkat Mirziyoyev
2020	7	6	Not Free	Shavkat Mirziyoyev
2021	7	6	Not Free	Shavkat Mirziyoyev
2022	7	6	Not Free	Shavkat Mirziyoyev
2023	7	6	Not Free	Shavkat Mirziyoyev

== See also ==
- Human rights in Asia
- LGBT rights in Uzbekistan
- Women in Uzbekistan
- Child labour in Uzbekistan

== Notes ==
1.Note that the "Year" signifies the "Year covered". Therefore the information for the year marked 2008 is from the report published in 2009, and so on.
2.As of January 1.
