= Simon Ostrovsky =

American journalist (born 1981)

- Симон Островский
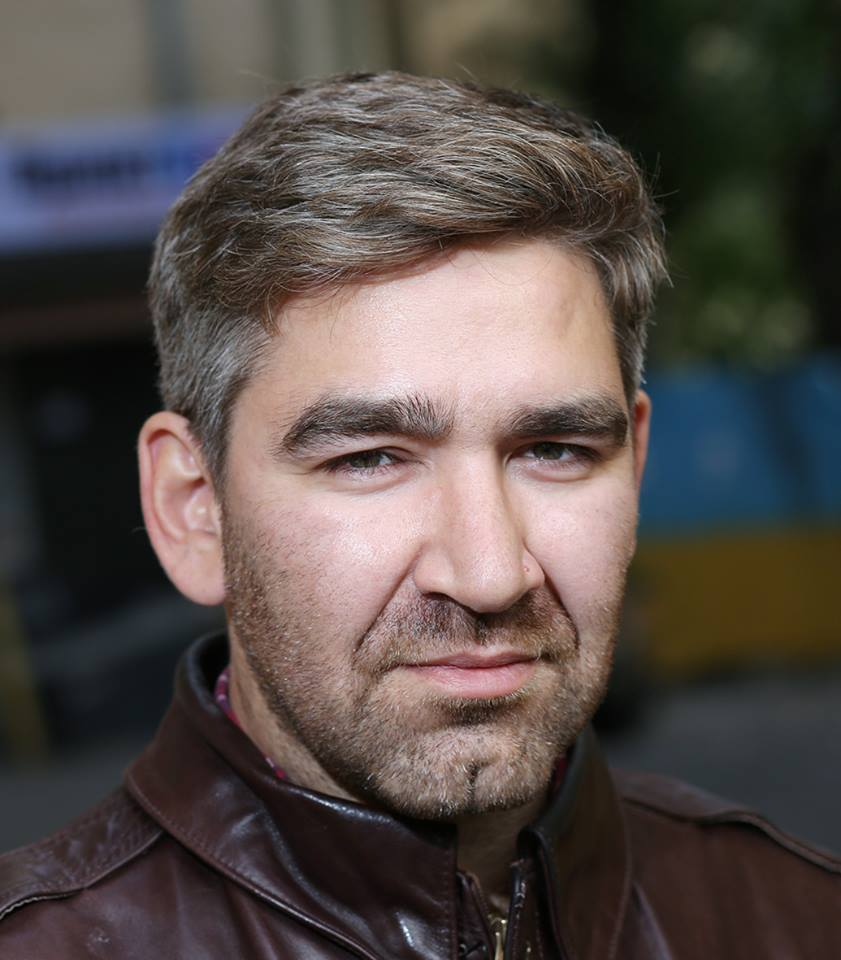
- Ostrovsky in Kyiv, Ukraine, October 2016
- Born: February 2, 1981 (age 45); Moscow, Russian SFSR, Soviet Union
- Citizenship: United States
- Occupations: Journalist; producer
- Years active: c. 2007–present
- Employer: PBS News Hour
- Awards: Emmy Award (2013); Alfred I. duPont–Columbia University Award (2016, 2023)
- Website: simonostrovsky.com

Simon Ostrovsky (Russian: Симон Островский; born February 2, 1981) is an American journalist and documentary producer. He is best known for his coverage of the Russo-Ukrainian War in 2014 and 2015, when he was dispatched by VICE News to cover the events that unfolded in Ukraine as the country came into conflict with neighbouring Russia prior to and after Crimea's annexation by the latter. His other reports have covered Uzbek child labour, North Korean internment camps, the 2015 Europe migrant crisis, and the Arab–Israeli conflict.

In April 2014, Ostrovsky was abducted by pro-Russia separatists after they identified him as a person of interest at their checkpoint in the Ukrainian city of Sloviansk; he was held hostage at a detention centre and tortured for three days before being released as the separatists retreated in the face of a Ukrainian military offensive. Later, in 2015, he filmed Selfie Soldiers, a documentary in which he elaborately traced and followed the social media presence of a Russian soldier who had been deployed to eastern Ukraine for the War in Donbas at a time when Russia was denying the existence of any Russian military presence in the Ukrainian mainland.

For his work with VICE Media, Ostrovsky won an Emmy Award in 2013, while his series Russian Roulette was nominated for two Emmys. He also received the Alfred I. duPont–Columbia University Award in 2016 and again in 2023. Currently, he is a special correspondent for PBS News Hour.

== Career ==
Ostrovsky started his career in documentary filmmaking in 2007 after spending six years as a print reporter in Russia, where he covered Russia for The Moscow Times and then Georgia, Armenia and Azerbaijan for the French news agency Agence France-Presse.

In 2007, Ostrovsky produced an exclusive report for BBC Newsnight investigating government-sponsored child labor in the cotton industry of Uzbekistan, which a US embassy cable published by Wikileaks credited with reigniting the global campaign against Uzbek cotton. Ostrovsky traced the supply chains of multinational garment retailers like Topshop, Walmart and H&M to Uzbekistan, leading many Western cotton buyers to eventually boycott the country.

In 2009, Ostrovsky exposed the use of North Koreans in work camps in Russia for BBC Newsnight, and linked their operations to the Russian Timber Group, a company owned and operated by the wealthy British Hambro family, which was paying the North Korean regime to use its workers in Russia.

He revisited those camps with VICE Media founder Shane Smith in 2011, and co-produced a separate report for VICE's documentary news series on HBO about the escape of defectors from North Korea in 2013.

Ostrovsky has reported extensively on the North Korean practice of sending workers abroad. In a report for the UK's Independent newspaper he described how a "North Korean labour force tens-of-thousands strong, put in place across Asia," helped finance the regime in Pyongyang through contracts with Western firms.

In 2013, VICE Media hired Ostrovsky as a producer for the second season of VICE on HBO, where he helped the program earn an Emmy as an "Outstanding Informational Series."

In early 2014, he helped launch the company's new current affairs division, VICE News, with his investigation into allegations of corruption at the 2014 Winter Olympics in Sochi and coverage of the 2014 crisis in Ukraine. His series of unvarnished video dispatches from Ukraine titled "Russian Roulette" won VICE News widespread acclaim and recognition as a burgeoning player on the media landscape. The series was nominated for two Emmys, won two Webby Awards in 2015, the AIB Media Excellence Awards and the Lovie Awards.

In 2017 CNN hired Ostrovsky to its expanded investigations unit which also includes veteran investigative journalist Carl Bernstein.

In 2018, Ostrovsky joined media start-up Coda Media as Investigations Editor and began contributing to PBS News Hour.

=== Abduction by pro-Russia militants in Ukraine (2014) ===
On April 21, 2014, while producing "Russian Roulette", a series of reports for Vice News in eastern Ukraine, Ostrovsky's vehicle was stopped at a separatist checkpoint in the city of Sloviansk. One of the rebels identified Ostrovsky as a person of interest through a printed image, before taking him captive under the militia of the separatist pro-Russian leader, Vyacheslav Ponomarev, who later said he was holding Ostrovsky for a potential trade. "We need prisoners. We need a bargaining chip," Ponomarev was quoted as telling The Moscow Times.

Ostrovsky was imprisoned for three days, during which he was held in a basement, beaten and interrogated. Ostrovsky described the ordeal as "the worst three days of my life" in an account he authored for Canada's Globe and Mail newspaper.

In the article, Ostrovsky wrote: "A hat was pulled over my head and taped over my eyes. My arms were pulled tightly behind my back and taped together too. I was led down a set of stairs and thrown into an empty, damp room … I was punched and kicked in the ribs and fell over to the ground."

Immediately prior to his detention, Ostrovsky had been investigating Russian citizens' involvement in the pro-Russia armed groups of eastern Ukraine, something separatist forces were trying to hide at that early stage of the conflict, according to a video deposition he made for VICE News following his release. He had also attended several press conferences of Ponomarev where the rebel leader had threatened journalists.

By April 24, Ostrovsky's detention had garnered considerable global media attention. The security situation around Sloviansk had begun to deteriorate, as Ukrainian forces reached the outskirts of the city and began engaging separatist units with armoured vehicles. By approximately 6:00 PM, Ostrovsky was released by his captors. Approximately "five minutes" after his release, he ran into a Canadian media crew, who helped him flee the city after conducting a quick interview. Later that day however, Ponomarev falsely or unknowingly told media that Ostrovsky was still being held.

=== Selfie Soldiers: Russia Checks in to Ukraine (2015) ===
In 2015, Ostrovsky reported and produced the video investigation Selfie Soldiers: Russia Checks in to Ukraine, in which he traces a Russian soldier's online presence to confirm that he had fought in Ukraine. In the documentary, he investigates pictures that the soldier uploaded to his social media account and, by figuring out the locations in all of the pictures, tracks him from Ukraine's Donbas to his hometown in Russia's Buryatia. Selfie Soldiers departs from other such investigations into soldiers' social media posts when Ostrovsky re-enacts the pictures himself to establish clearly that he has personally visited the locations where they were taken inside of both Ukraine and Russia. The film was awarded the prestigious Alfred I. duPont–Columbia University Award for its "innovative reporting" and an American Society of Magazine Editors Award for "outstanding use of video" in 2016.

== Awards ==
Date	Award	Ref(s)
2013	Emmy - Outstanding Informational Series	
2015	Webby Award - News & Politics: Series	
2015	Webby Award - News & Politics: Individual episode	
2015	AIB Award - Short News Report	
2015	Lovie Award - Best Web Personality/Host	
2016	DuPont Columbia University Award for Journalism	
2016	ASME award (Ellie) - Video Award	
2016	Webby Honoree - Online Film & Video, News & Politics	
2023	DuPont Columbia University Award for Journalism	
2023	Overseas Press Club's David Kaplan Award - Citation	

== See also ==
- Sloviansk standoff
