= Battle of Sloviansk =

Battle of Sloviansk may refer to:

- Siege of Sloviansk, a 2014 Ukrainian operation in the War in Donbas
- Sloviansk offensive, a battle in the 2022 Russian invasion of Ukraine
