= Sergei Zhurikov =

Ukrainian separatist military commander

- Сергей Журиков
- Born: 21 November 1980; Sevastopol, Ukrainian SSR, Soviet Union
- Died: 2 May 2014 (aged 33); Sloviansk, Donetsk Oblast, Ukraine
- Cause of death: Killed in Action
- Military career
- Allegiance: Donetsk People's Republic
- Branch: Donbas People's Militia
- Nickname: Romashka
- Conflicts: Russo-Ukrainian War; War in Donbas; Siege of Sloviansk †

Sergei Nikolayevich Zhurikov (Russian: Сергей Николаевич Журиков; Ukrainian: Сергій Миколайович Журіков, romanized: Serhiy Mykolaiovych Zhurikov; 21 November 1980 – 2 May 2014) was a Ukrainian pro-Russian collaborator and commander of the Donbas People's Militia in the secessionist Donetsk People's Republic during the war in Donbas. He was killed during the siege of Sloviansk fighting against Ukrainian government forces.

== Biography ==
Zhurikov was born in Sevastopol (Crimea) on November 21, 1980. Before the Russo-Ukrainian War, he served as a sacristan in Kyiv Pechersk Lavra.

During the Russo-Ukrainian War he joined separatist forces under the nom de guerre "Romashka" ("Daisy"), and became one of the leaders of the Sloviansk militia.

== Death ==
During the early morning on 2 May 2014, Ukrainian government forces launched a large-scale operation to retake the city of Sloviansk, starting the second offensive. During the fighting in the center of Sloviansk Sergei Zhurikov was shot by a sniper of the Ukrainian army in May 2, 2014. However, in a 2019 interview, fellow collaborator and fighter Andriy "Veter" Eremenko claimed that Zhurikov was executed by unknown assailants while in a bathroom indoors.

After his death he was buried in Seredyna-Buda, Sumy Oblast of Ukraine according to the wishes of his mother.

== Legacy ==
Russian poet Ivan Belokrylov dedicated a poem to Sergei Zhurikov called "Ballad of a Sexton".
