= Cotton production in Uzbekistan =

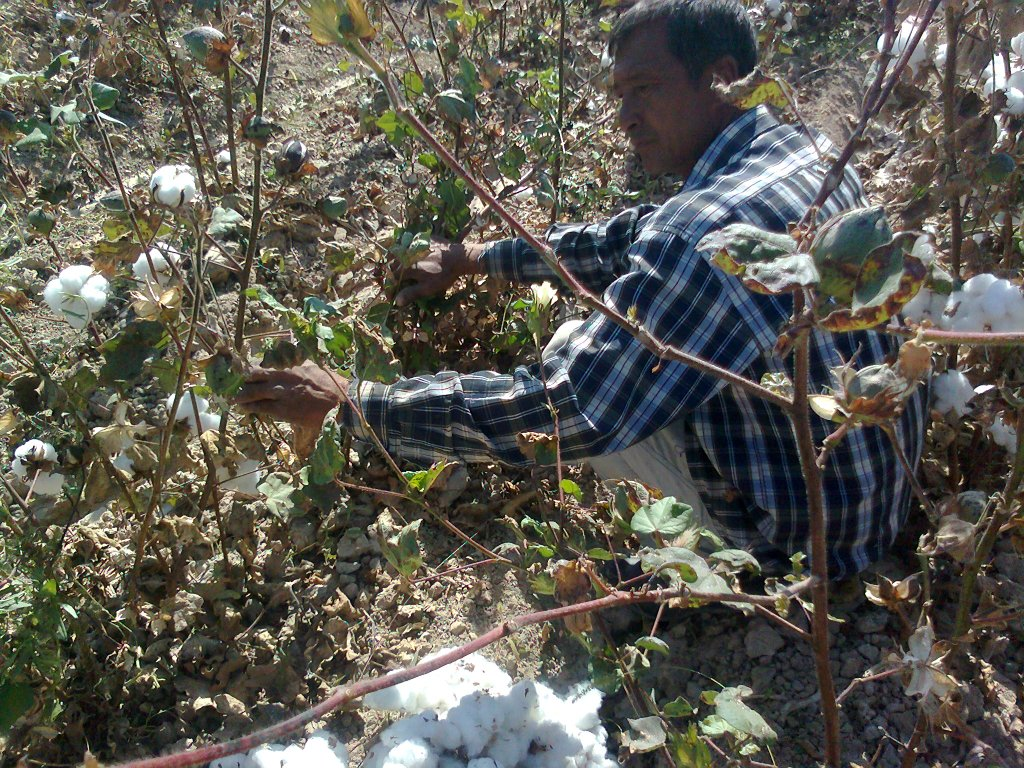
Cotton handle peeling (Buka district, Tashkent region, Uzbekistan)

Cotton production in Uzbekistan is important to the national economy of the country. It is Uzbekistan's main cash crop, accounting for 17% of its exports in 2006. With annual cotton production of about 1 million ton of fiber (4–5% of world production) and exports of 700,000-800,000 tons (10% of world exports), Uzbekistan is the 8th largest producer and the 11th largest exporter of cotton in the world. Cotton's nickname in Uzbekistan is "white gold" (Uzbek: oq oltin).

Up to 2017, the industry was state-controlled on a national level. About two million people were involved in the harvesting of cotton every year. Many of them were forced to work in the cotton fields, receiving little or no pay. In an economy which is the 82nd largest in the world, cotton is crucial for Uzbekistan.

Cotton production has declined from its Soviet-era peak. According to the United States Department of Agriculture, Uzbekistan's lint cotton production for marketing year 2024/25 was estimated at 640,000 metric tons (about 2.9 million 480-pound bales). This downward trend is attributed to the precedence given to food crops, an essential requirement. Cotton exports are mainly to China, Bangladesh, Korea and Russia. Uzbekistan has launched a development effort to manufacture cotton textiles through enhancing cotton processing chains and mills. The Uzbekistan cotton industry has also been affected by the boycotting of its cotton by many global companies after human rights reports revealed working conditions that include child labor and forced labor as well as a boycott due to the destruction caused to the Aral Sea through the diversion of water away from it.

In March 2022. the Cotton Campaign ended its call to boycott Uzbek cotton. This follows extensive reforms in Uzbekistan by the current president Shavkat Mirziyoyev, who has pledged to outlaw forced labour in Uzbekistan since coming to power in 2016. In 2022 the International Labour Organisation (ILO) announced that the Uzbek cotton industry is free of child and forced labour. In September 2022, the President said that the quota system for farmers had been abolished, and cotton was no longer exported, and was instead processed domestically.

== History ==
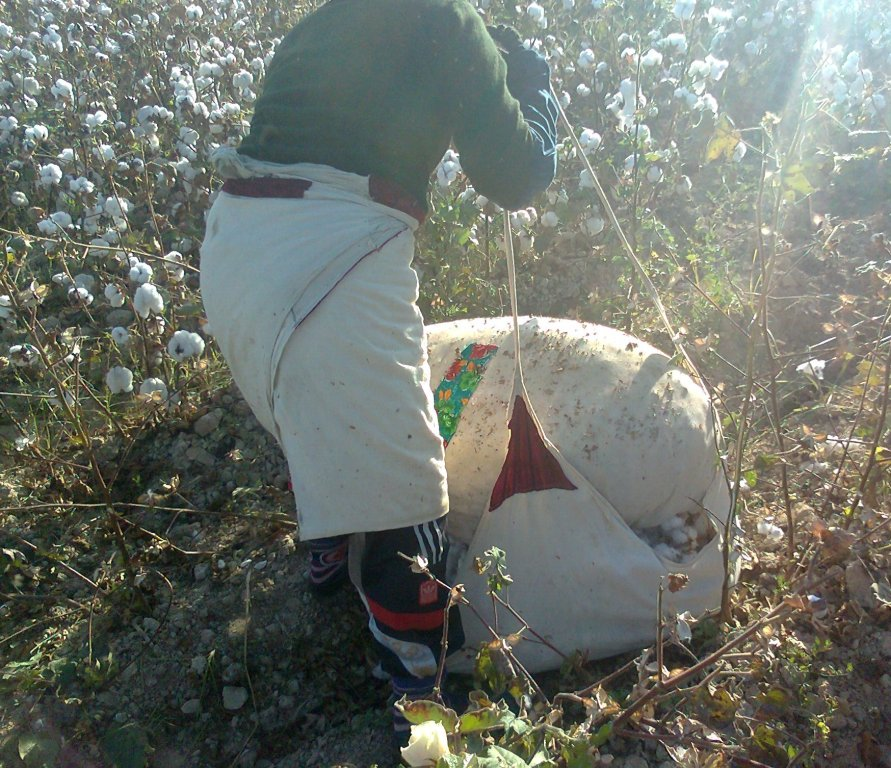
A man volunteering to harvest cotton, 2012

Cotton grown on Uzbekistan land was recorded nearly 2000 years ago by the Chinese. Production of cotton dramatically increased under Soviet Russian and the Uzbek SSR, with the Uzbek SSR accounting for 70% of Soviet production. The government strictly controlled the industry and introduced quotas to ensure efficient production at collective farms (kolkhozes).

Between 1976 and 1983, the country's leadership defrauded the Soviet central bank by falsely inflating Uzbek cotton harvest yields, creating the "cotton scandal" as the most notorious scandal during the tenure of Sharof Rashidov; it resulted in discrediting the political elite of Uzbekistan. Since independence, the Soviet-style quotas have remained intact and the Uzbek government still dominates the national industry.

Because of the risks associated with a one-crop economy and from considerations of food security for the population, Uzbekistan has been moving to diversify its production into cereals, while reducing cotton production. Thus, the area sown to cotton was reduced from 1.8 million hectares in 1990 to 1.4 million hectares in 2006, while the area under cereals increased from 1.0 million to 1.6 million hectares (in part at the expense of areas allocated to feed crops). Another cause behind moves to diversify may be environmental, because the large quantities of irrigation and fertilization needed to produce cotton have contributed to the drying up of the Aral Sea and to the severe pollution of the soil in the surrounding areas.

== Farming ==
Cotton is planted during April-early May and harvested in September. The plantations are concentrated in the periphery of Aydar Lake (near Bukhara) and also to some extent in Tashkent along the Syr Darya, and along the Amu Darya in the border area with Turkmenistan. During the year 2010–11, the area under cotton plantation was about 1.3 million hectares and the yield of lint reported was 752 kg/hectare. Okdare 6, Namangan 77 and Tashkent 6 are the common varieties of cotton planted in the country. However, while appreciating the need to introduce better high yielding and early maturing cotton, new varieties have been adopted since 2009; these varieties are: Bukhara 102, Bukhara 8, Andijan 35 and Khoresm 150. Most of cotton farms are irrigated but there is need to rehabilitate the water supply system to reduce water loss. Pests are suitably controlled with biological methods.

== Forced labour ==
Forced child labour in cotton production is a practice in Uzbekistan, and the Uzbek government has long employed children as young as 9 in the industry. From a very young age, children are reared to look forward to harvest time, known as "pahta" and to enjoy harvesting the cotton as an "opportunity for them to contribute to their nation's prosperity". Many farmers are forced to produce cotton but the state reaps the profits for exporting it. If government workers and professionals refuse to work they can be penalised with a lower income and the child workers can be beaten.

Anti-Slavery International describes the conditions of the cotton industry in the country as "appalling". The Cotton Campaign was established in 2007 in Washington, DC to improve human rights in Uzbekistan. They allege that the Karimov administration "detains, tortures, and exiles Uzbek citizens who call for recognition of human rights, violating their human rights and denying freedoms of speech and the press" and that the forced labour system in the country "violates the human rights of Uzbek citizens and condemns future generations to a cycle of poverty" and "blatantly violates the international convention against trafficking in persons and the Universal Declaration of Human Rights." The Cotton Campaign actively seeks for government change in respecting human rights and to permit the International Labour Organization to monitor production in the country.

As a result of the human rights reports of misconduct in Uzbekistan, several companies such as H&M, Tesco, IKEA, Adidas and Marks & Spencer have detached themselves and have proclaimed that they are doing all they can to avoid and boycott the use of Uzbekistani cotton in their products. Josefin Thorell, a spokeswoman for IKEA said "We do all we can to ensure that Uzbek cotton is not used in our products, but the traceability process for the cotton industry is not robust. In the case of, for example, Bangladesh, where much of the cotton used in manufacturing is traditionally from Uzbekistan, IKEA suppliers are required to buy from India." In October 2014 Tesco signed the Responsible Sourcing Network's pledge not to source cotton from Uzbekistan. Giles Bolton, Responsible Sourcing Director at Tesco, said: "Tesco was one of the first retailers to ban the use of Uzbek cotton in the supply chain in 2007, and we are now very proud to be a signatory to the Cotton Pledge. Eliminating cotton picked with forced labor is a critical step in the responsible sourcing process."

In response to international pressure and the threat to the industry from the boycotting of its cotton, conditions in the country are gradually improving. In early 2012, Uzbekistani Prime Minister Shavkat Mirziyayev (who has since succeeded Karimov to the presidency of Uzbekistan) issued a decree banning children from working in the cotton fields. However, many professionals including teachers, college lecturers, doctors and nurses are still forced to work in the fields at times of harvest. Now outlawed, the defoliant Butifos is responsible for exceptionally high infant mortality and birth defect rates among children born to women who work in the cotton fields.

In December 2014, the List of Goods Produced by Child Labor or Forced Labor issued by the U.S. Department of Labor reported that the cotton industry is still employing underage children and indentured labourers.

Uzbek human rights activist Elena Urlaeva, who was arrested and detained in psychiatric hospitals in 2015, 2016 and 2017 for shedding a light on forced labour in the cotton industry, played a major role in the campaign to boycott Uzbek cotton.

== Lifting of cotton ban ==
In March 2022, the Cotton Campaign ended its call to boycott Uzbek cotton. This follows extensive reforms in Uzbekistan by the current president Shavkat Mirziyoyev, who has pledged to outlaw forced labour in Uzbekistan since coming to power in 2016. In 2022 the International Labour Organisation (ILO) announced that the Uzbek cotton industry is free of child and forced labour. According to the ILO, "the country has succeeded in eradicating systemic forced labour and systemic child labour during the 2021 cotton production cycle". In September 2022, the US Government also lifted the ban on cotton. It cited the removed Uzbek cotton from the List of Goods Produced by Child Labor or Forced Labor. This was the only legal obstacle preventing U.S. entities from importing cotton and products made of cotton from Uzbekistan.

== Current production ==
As of March 2020, Uzbekistan liberalized the cotton market with a presidential decree. Starting from the 2020 harvest season, State regulation of cotton production, price and mandatory sales plan is abolished. The cotton production area is estimated as 980,000 hectares for Marketing Year (MY) 2020/21 and the production is about 3.1 million bales (about 670,000 MT). At this point, it was expected that Uzbekistan's cotton exports will be kept to minimal levels due to the government policy to increase value-added yarn and fabric production and develop the domestic textile industry.

The Government has dedicated significant resources into increasing cotton processing and textile manufacturing. According to Government statistics, since 2017, cotton processing has increased from 40% of cotton crop in 2017, to 100% in 2022. In September 2022, the President said that the quote system for famers had been abolished, and cotton was no longer exported, and was instead processed domestically.

Significant foreign investment in the Uzbek cotton industry has also taken place. Notably, in 2018 American company Silverleafe invested heavily into developing a cotton cluster in the Jizzakh region of Uzbekistan. The company is working to introduce modern and sustainable technologies to the Uzbek cotton sector, including full traceability of products. Dan Patterson, Silverleafe General Director, was awarded the Order of Friendship by President Shavkat Mirziyoyev in 2022.

Uzbek cotton exports have become the cause of a scandal related to the Russian-Ukrainian war and sanctions imposed on the Russian military industry. According to the Organized Crime and Corruption Reporting Project (OCCRP), Vlast, and iStories, after February 24, 2022, Uzbekistan significantly increased its exports of cotton pulp and nitrocellulose to Russia, key components for the manufacture of explosives and gunpowder. According to Ekonomichna Pravda, at least two large Uzbek exporters have been working with Russian military-industrial complex enterprises. Documents from the Federal Tax Service of the Russian Federation confirm that at least three Russian companies - Bina Group, Khimtrade, and Lenakhim - sold imported cotton pulp in Russia to military plants under US sanctions.
