= LGBTQ rights in Uzbekistan =

- Uzbekistan
- Legal status: Male: illegal since 1926 (as Uzbek SSR); Female: not criminalized
- Penalty: Up to 3 years imprisonment
- Gender identity: No
- Military: No
- Discrimination protections: None

Family rights
- Recognition of relationships: No recognition of same-sex unions
- Adoption: No

Lesbian, gay, bisexual, transgender, and queer (LGBTQ) people face widespread prosecution in Uzbekistan. Same-sex sexual activity between men is illegal in Uzbekistan. The punishment is up to 3 years in prison. Uzbekistan is one of just 2 post-Soviet states in which male homosexual activity remains criminalized, along with Turkmenistan.

Serious societal discrimination and abuse is directed towards LGBTQ persons, which includes mob violence, harassment, entrapment for the purpose of blackmail, and threats and use of violence. Despite the incidence of violence and intimidation, LGBTQ persons generally do not report these crimes to authorities for fear of further victimisation at their hands. There are reports of extortion by police, intimidation, arbitrary detention, assaults and other mistreatment of victims who have sought police assistance. Human rights violations by police also include torture, and severe beatings in detention. Vigilante attacks and mob violence, and other hate crimes, including murders, are targeted at LGBTQ individuals.

The Uzbek government has dismissed the need for action to protect sexual minorities, with one official declaring that even if same-sex sexual activities were decriminalised, LGBTQ persons could not be kept safe. Community attitudes that fuel such anti-LGBTQ activity stem from the Uzbek "mentality", with their "religion, culture, and traditions" making "gay men and women" unacceptable in the country, according to the spokesperson.

== Legality of same-sex sexual activity ==
Laws criminalizing consensual same-sex sexual activity between men were enacted in the Uzbek SSR in 1926. It is criminalised in present-day Uzbekistan by Article 120 of Uzbek's criminal code (1994):

Besoqolbozlik, that is, voluntary sexual intercourse of two male individuals – shall be punished with imprisonment up to three years.

— § 120, Uzbek Penal Code 1994 (revised 2001)

== Morality laws ==
Article 130 covers the distribution of pornographic materials. This provision and was strengthened in 2012:

Production with a purpose of demonstration and dissemination of, as well as demonstration and dissemination of obscene objects to persons under twenty-one of age committed after imposing of administrative penalty for the same actions – shall be punished with fine from one hundred to two hundreds minimal monthly wages or correctional labor up to three years.

— § 130, Uzbek Penal Code 1994 (amended 2001)

== LGBT propaganda draft law ==
In November 2024, Alisher Qodirov the leader of the Milliy Tiklanish party announced that he was drafting a law banning discussions of LGBTQ people. Qodirov claimed the law was inspired by statements made by Donald Trump's daughter, Ivanka Trump about "LGBT propaganda" in schools.

== Constitution of Uzbekistan ==
In April 2023, the Constitution of Uzbekistan deliberately leaves out "sexual orientation" - despite all other categories explicitly being included - such as gender, race, religion and nationality.

== Summary table ==
Same-sex sexual activity legal	No Illegal for males (Penalty: Up to 3 years in prison); Yes Legal for females
Equal age of consent	No
Anti-discrimination laws in employment only	No
Anti-discrimination laws in the provision of goods and services	No
Anti-discrimination laws in all other areas (incl. indirect discrimination, hate speech)	No
Same-sex marriages	No
Recognition of same-sex couples	No
Step-child adoption by same-sex couples	No
Joint adoption by same-sex couples	No
Gays, lesbians and bisexuals allowed to serve openly in the military	No
Right to change legal gender	Yes Since 1998
Access to IVF for lesbians	No
Commercial surrogacy for gay male couples	No
MSM allowed to donate blood	Yes There are no known restrictions on men who have sex with men donating blood
Conversion therapy banned	No

== See also ==
- Human rights in Uzbekistan
- LGBTQ rights in Asia
