= 31st Public Order Brigade =

31st Public Order Protection Brigade
- 31-ша бригада НГ (Ukrainian)
- Brigade Insignia
- Founded: 1992
- Country: Ukraine
- Allegiance: Ministry of Internal Affairs
- Branch: National Guard of Ukraine
- Type: Brigade
- Role: Law enforcement, protection of the Ukrainian territorial integrity
- Part of: National Guard of Ukraine
- Garrison/HQ: Dnipro
- Nickname: Major General Oleksandr Radievskyi Brigade
- Patron: Major General Oleksandr Radievskyi
- Engagements: Russo-Ukrainian war: War in Donbas; Siege of Sloviansk; Russian invasion of Ukraine; 2022 Kharkiv counteroffensive; Eastern Ukraine campaign

The 31st Public Order Protection Brigade "Major General Oleksandr Radievskyi" is a Brigade of the National Guard of Ukraine tasked with protection of the public order and the territorial integrity of Ukraine. It was established on January 2, 1992, as the 5th NG Regiment on the basis of the 24th Separate Special Motorized Militia Battalion. It has seen combat during the War in Donbas and the Russian invasion of Ukraine. Its headquartered in Dnipro.

== History ==
In 1992, following the Dissolution of the Soviet union, the 5th Regiment of the National Guard of Ukraine was established on the basis of the 24th Separate Special Motorized Militia Battalion. Then, it was transferred to the Internal Troops of Ukraine. After the reestablishment of the National Guard of Ukraine, it was transferred there becoming the 16th Public Order Protection Regiment.

During the War in Donbass, the regiment saw combat on multiple occasions. On 29 May 2014, servicemen of the Dnipropetrovsk Regiment were returning to their temporary deployment point in the city of Izium after providing logistical aid and combat support to the Ukrainian troops during the Siege of Sloviansk. While they were approaching Kamianka (Izium Raion), separatists using VAZ-2110s ambushed the convoy and attacked the KAMAZ of the regiment with machine guns and underbarrel grenade launchers. A soldier of the regiment, Volodymyr Oleksandrovych Isadchenko (born 1994), was killed and two more were wounded.

On 14 October 2020, the 16th regiment was awarded the honorary title of "Major General Oleksandr Radievskyi" after the Major General Oleksandr Vitaliyovych Radievskyi of the 21st Public Order Protection Brigade.

In 2022, amidst the Russian invasion of Ukraine, the regiment was expanded becoming the 31st Public Order Protection Brigade. The brigade took part in the 2022 Kharkiv counteroffensive and then from February 2023, the brigade saw action in Donetsk Oblast. The Russian T-80s regularly approached its positions coming at a distance of about 100 meters and shelled the brigade's position but they repelled the tanks and even destroyed a T-80. On 10 April 2023, Russians charged at the brigade's positions defending Kreminna but were forced to retreat by Zhukov Vadim Andriyovych who launched a successful grenade attack, the next morning the positions were hit by artillery strike killing Zhukov Vadim Andriyovych who was awarded the Hero of Ukraine. The brigade also raised the Ukrainian flag over the village of Zavitne Bazhana after liberating it. In December 2023, the brigade performed a raiding operation on multiple Russian positions in which many personnel planted explosives in Russian positions covertly and detonated them successfully.

== Sources ==
- Військовослужбовці Дніпровського полку охорони громадського порядку відсвяткували 51-у річницю заснування військової частини
- У військовій частині 3036 Національної гвардії України розпочалась здача підсумкової перевірки за 2015 рік
- Днепровская военная часть 3036 отметила полвека
- У Нацгвардії тривають навчання підрозділів протиповітряної оборони
- Військова частина 3036 святкує 32-річчя
- Військова частина 3036 святкує 50-річчя з Дня заснування
- «Пташки» 31 Бригади НГУ утримують рубежі оборони по лінії зіткнення з противником
- Командир військової частини підполковник Євген Шульга про роботу 16 полку охорони громадського порядку (інтерв’ю від грудня 2021 року)
- Андрій Касенюк - гітарист рок-гурту "SilverTown", боєць НГУ у програмі "Фреш" з Юлією Сиротою
- День Незалежності під час війни коментує підполковник Нацгвардії Заступник командира по роботі з особовим складом Святослав Білейчук (2023 рік)
- «Підсмажили» позиції росіян на Донеччині: гвардійці 31 Бригади НГУ успішно виконали бойове завдання (грудень 2023)
- Капличка для військовослужбовців: телеканал «Суспільне»
- Підняли прапор над селищем Завітне Бажання Волноваського району Донецької області
- Кадри роботи мінометної батареї Дніпровскої бригади НГУ ім. генерал-майора Олександра Радієвського: Укрінформ.ТБ - грудень 2022 року
- Капелан НГУ ім. О. Радієвського, протоієрей ПЦУ о. Костянтин у програмі "Фреш" з Юлією Сиротою
- Сергій Кравченко - командир роти 31 бригади НГУ у програмі "Фреш" з Юлією Сиротою
- Відлік року після ракетного удару: будинок 118 на Перемозі - інтерв’ю командира резерву 31 Бригади НГУ майора Віктора Алещенко (з 5.37 хвилини)
