= Sanjar Umarov =

Uzbekistani dissident (born 1956)

Sanjar Gʻiyasovich Umarov (Uzbek Cyrillic: Санжар Ғиясович Умаров; born 7 April 1956) is a prominent Uzbek politician and businessman. He is the chairman of Sunshine Uzbekistan, the main party in opposition to president Islam Karimov's authoritarian rule. He was arrested in October 2005 for embezzlement—charges his supporters say are politically motivated—and was imprisoned until November 2009, when he was freed and allowed to move to the United States.

== Biography ==
Umarov was born in Tashkent, Uzbekistan, as the middle child of five in a large family of intellectuals. His father, Guiess Ekub Umarov, was a physicist; his mother, Nabira Shamsieva, was a university English instructor. Umarov attended the Tashkent University of Irrigation and Mechanization of Agriculture, earning a bachelor's degree in electrical engineering. Following this, he served as an intercontinental ballistic missile technician at Bauman's Technical University in Moscow. He went on to the Tashkent Polytechnic Institute for a PhD; his dissertation, defended in 1982, was on applications of solar energy.

Upon earning his degree, Umarov gained a position at Algeria University in Biskra, Algeria, teaching physics and engineering. He returned to Uzbekistan in 1988, where he participated in the establishment of Uzbekistan's first business school in 1989.

Following his return, he became interested in the possibilities of mobile phones in the newly independent states of the former Soviet Union, and founded telecommunications company Uzdunrobita in February 1991, with the backing of investors from the United States. Following Uzdunrobita's success, Umarov went on to found a number of other businesses in Uzbekistan; in addition to telecommunications, he concentrated on companies related to agriculture, petroleum, and natural gas. He became particularly known for his close ties with western investors, and worked largely to facilitate foreign investment.

In 2005, he founded Sunshine Uzbekistan Coalition, an association of civil groups and intellectuals, which sought to open a dialogue with the Government of Uzbekistan concerning economic reforms that could dramatically improve the quality of life of Uzbek citizens. Advocating free trade and private ownership of the agricultural industry, Sunshine Uzbekistan Coalition emerged in March 2005 as a pro-democracy organization advocating economic reforms.

In October 2005, he was arrested on charges of embezzlement and money laundering. His supporters allege that these charges are politically motivated, pointing to the fact that his arrest came shortly after he sent a letter to Parliament advocating reforms. Umarov's lawyer further claims to have found him naked and incoherent during a visit to his jail cell, and supporters allege that he was drugged. Human rights groups accuse Uzbekistan's government of regularly drugging prisoners to extract confessions, an allegation the government denies.

Umarov's trial began in January 2006, and he was convicted in March 2006 of heading a criminal group laundering money through offshore companies, tax avoidance, and hiding foreign currency. He was sentenced to 14 years in prison (reduced to 10 years under an amnesty agreement) and over US$8 million in fines. Umarov was held in Prison Camp Kizil-Tepa, Uzbekistan for four years.

As a result of diplomatic pressure, Umarov was released on November 7, 2009 and returned home to his family in Germantown, Tennessee two weeks later, on Saturday, November 21. Umarov has since been living in United States and has continued to work with Sunshine Uzbekistan to promote human rights in Uzbekistan.
