= Vyacheslav Ponomarev (public figure) =

Self-proclaimed mayor of Sloviansk, Ukraine

- Вячеслав Пономарёв
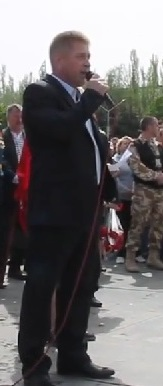
- Ponomarev in Sloviansk, 2014

People's Mayor of Sloviansk (self-proclaimed)
- In office 12 April – 10 June 2014
- Succeeded by: Volodymyr Pavlenko

Personal details
- Born: 2 May 1965 (age 61) Sloviansk, Donetsk Oblast, Ukrainian SSR, Soviet Union

Vyacheslav Vladimirovich Ponomarev (Note: The surname is also transliterated as Ponomaryov.) (Russian: Вячеслав Владимирович Пономарёв; born 2 May 1965) is a pro-Russian former owner of a soap production company who briefly achieved prominence in 2014 as the self-proclaimed mayor of the city of Sloviansk, at that time a focal point at the beginning of the war in Donbas.

Ponomarev held the position of "people's mayor" for around two months, before his arrest and dismissal. Following the separatists' retreat from Sloviansk, Ponomarev relocated to Moscow and has since retreated from public life.

== Political career ==
=== "People's Mayor" of Sloviansk ===
At a time of turbulence in Ukraine following the Euromaidan victory, and then protests in the country's eastern Donbas, Ponomarev emerged from apparent obscurity, having owned a soap production company, declaring himself mayor after leading an assault on the Sloviansk mayor's office on 14 April 2014, as part of the 2014 pro-Russian unrest in Ukraine. Ponamarev was a strong opponent of the government of Ukraine that formed in Kyiv after the Revolution of Dignity, referring to it as "fascist" and claiming Ukraine was being run by "Nazis" and "homosexuals".

In May 2014, Ponomarev stated that he commanded around 2,500 men in the vicinity of Sloviansk. He is a veteran of the Soviet–Afghan War and served in a special operations unit of the Arctic-based Northern Fleet.

==== Detentions and disappearances ====
Ponomarev's tenure as "people's mayor" was noted for a string of detentions. Ponomarev is known to have been personally involved in the following:

- On 25 April 2014, a vehicle with representatives from the Organization for Security and Co-operation in Europe (OSCE) was stopped and the observers detained by Ponomarev's men.
- His men held the elected mayor of Sloviansk, Nelya Shtepa, in captivity, though Ponomarev said that his government was protecting her from Ukrainian law enforcement after the Security Service of Ukraine (SBU) opened a case against her for separatism. He also stated that there was conflict between him and Shtepa, in which she acted "incorrectly". In an interview to Gazeta.Ru, Ponomarev said that she was given protection.
- On the direction of Ponomarev, his men detained American Vice News journalist Simon Ostrovsky on 20 April, who declared after his release that he had been intimidated and beaten during his detention. According to the journalist, Ponomarev's men had his photo and were looking for him. According to Ponomarev, Ostrovsky has dual citizenship and was a spy. In an interview to Gazeta.Ru on 23 April, Ponomarev acknowledged that he had kept Ostrovsky for exchange. Ostrovsky was released only after the intervention of OSCE representatives and the United States Department of State. Ponomarev told the media that Ostrovsky was not a hostage, but a "guest", and that he simply "accommodated Ostrovsky with lodging".
- Irma Krat, a Euromaidan activist and blogger who had arrived in the city to cover the conflict, was detained and later paraded in front of the press with a bag on her head.

Ponomarev later declared that kidnapping of people is a retaliation for all his detained "comrades".

- According to the SBU, Ponomarev also received orders from Igor Girkin on 20 April 2014 to dispose of the body of local representative of Horlivka city council Volodymyr Rybak, who had been kidnapped and tortured to death.

==== Arrest and dismissal ====
Ponomarev had a fractious relationship with Girkin, who was in charge of the military operations of the pro-Russian side in Sloviansk. On 10 June 2014, on Girkin's command, Ponomarev was arrested and taken to the headquarters of the Donbass People's Militia in a former SBU building. With charges relating to misappropriation of civic funds, Ponomarev was dismissed from his duties and Volodymyr Pavlenko was appointed "people's mayor" of Sloviansk. Ponomarev was then released and spent the rest of June under house arrest. He was next seen, along with the withdrawing pro-Russian militia, leaving Sloviansk on 5 July 2014.

== Later life ==
While many of the pro-Russian side headed for Donetsk, Ponomarev is believed to have gone straight to Moscow, where he left public life. As of 2018, he was reported to be working on a building site in Moscow.
