= Azam Farmonov =

Uzbekistani rural development activist

- Occupation: rural development activist
- Known for: 2006 imprisonment
- Spouse: Ozoda Yakubova

Azam Farmonov is an Uzbekistani rural development activist who spent 11 years in prison following conviction for extortion in 2006. Amnesty International considered him a prisoner of conscience and in 2011 named him a "priority case".

Farmonov has a wife, Ozoda Yakubova, and two children. His father-in-law, Talib Yakubov, is the Vice President of the Human Rights Society of Uzbekistan.

On 29 April 2006, Farmonov was arrested along with fellow activist Alisher Karamatov and charged with extortion. The two later reported torture by security forces, including partial suffocation with a disconnected gas mask and beatings on the legs and heels. Human Rights Watch condemned the trial and stated that it "appear[ed] to be a politically motivated effort to stop their human rights work" in keeping with a recent pattern of suspicious charges against human rights workers. Front Line also described the arrests as politically motivated and "part of an ongoing campaign against human rights defenders in Uzbekistan." Amnesty International condemned the charges and called for the immediate release of Farmonov and Karamatov. Uzbekistani government officials, however, denied that the extortion charges were politically motivated.

Both men were convicted and sentenced to nine years in prison. Farmonov was the first citizen activist to be sent to the notorious Jaslik "severe regime" prison camp in violation of his sentence, which called for a "general regime" camp. According to his wife, he was repeatedly placed in a "punishment cell," and on 8 January 2008, was stripped naked, handcuffed, and left in an unheated punishment cell for 23 days. In April 2015 his prison term was extended by another five years after the authorities accused him of disobedience to prison rules.

Farmonov was freed from Jaslik on 3 October 2017, two and a half years before the end of his extended prison sentence.
