= Forum 18 =

Norwegian human rights organization

Forum 18 is a Norwegian human rights organization that promotes religious freedom. The organization's name is based on Article 18 of the Universal Declaration of Human Rights. Forum 18 summarizes the article as:

- The right to believe, to worship and witness
- The right to change one's belief or religion
- The right to join together and express one's belief

The Forum 18 News Service, established by Forum 18 on March 12, 2003, is a web and e-mail initiative to report on threats and actions against the religious freedom of all people, whatever their religious affiliation, in an objective, truthful and timely manner. The first three reporters to lead this project were Felix Corley, Geraldine Fagan, and Igor Rotar. They had previously done similar reporting for the UK-based Keston News Service and continued this work at Forum 18 after Keston Institute closed its news service.

The news service concentrates on the states of Eastern Europe, including Belarus and Russia, the South Caucasus, including Azerbaijan and Georgia, as well as Central Asia, including Tajikistan, Turkmenistan, and Uzbekistan,.

It has published reports on Kosovo, North Macedonia, Serbia, Turkey, Myanmar, China (including Xinjiang), Laos, Mongolia, North Korea, and Vietnam.

The news service is published in two editions: a weekly news summary each Friday; and an almost daily edition published on weekdays. There is a searchable archive of reports, including religious freedom surveys of countries and regions, and personal commentaries on religious freedom issues.

In August 2005 one of the organisation's reporters was detained and deported by the authorities at Tashkent airport in Uzbekistan, but it carries on covering that country.

Forum 18 News Service's reports on religious freedom are widely used by international organizations like Amnesty International, Human Rights Watch, and the Organization for Security and Co-operation in Europe (OSCE), as well as numerous news sites with different religious affiliation (i.e. Muslim, Christian, Bahá'í, and Buddhist).
