= Child labour in Uzbekistan =

Child labor is widespread in Uzbekistan, both through agriculture and public works as well as commercial sexual exploitation, sometimes through human trafficking. The government has been working to reduce child labor through legislation and public awareness programs, which has largely eliminated forced child labor in the cotton industry outside of isolated incidents. In 2022, the International Labour Organization declared that Uzbek cotton is free from systemic child labor and forced labor, with 99% of participants in the 2021 harvest working voluntarily. Previously, a 2007 BBC Newsnight report stated that this forced labour occurred for two and a half months each year, in a cotton industry that was controlled completely by the Uzbek state. Radio Free Europe reported Uzbek human rights activists saying that the forced labour of children was "deliberate state policy".

A number of Western retail groups including Asda, Gap, Marks & Spencer and Tesco boycotted the Uzbek cotton due to their use of child labor. Following the end of child labor in the cotton industry in 2022, the boycott has been lifted.

The end of child labor in the cotton industry was a long-term effort by the government. Following widespread global coverage about these practices and in committing to end this practice, the Cabinet of Ministers of Uzbekistan declared its intent to ensure that no one under the age of 18 would participate in the cotton harvest, as highlighted in a report by the US Department of Labor. The same report also highlights that the Uzbek government also led a monitoring effort utilizing ILO methodology to observe the fall 2014 harvest in all cotton-growing regions of the country, finding 41 child labourers, assessing penalties to 19 school officials and farm managers for the use of child labour and removing children from the fields. In a few instances, reports indicate that a local government authority such as a district or regional governing official or town mayor may have directly ordered the mobilization of students under age 18.

Some NGOs, notably the Uzbek – German Forum for Human Rights (UGF), have attempted to raise awareness of these unethical practices, both worldwide and in Europe. UGF is supported by a host of non-profits and NGOs, including Save the Children Central Asia.

Outside of the cotton fields, child labor has persisted through many children selling items in the streets or begging – some because they are forced, and others because their families are unable to survive without the additional support. In 2023, Madina Ochilova, a lawyer and a civil society activist, said that “It often happens that a minor is forced to look for work due to difficult family circumstances.” One of the primary factors blamed for this is the Uzbek government's lack of support for low-income families, including by blocking the creation of non-governmental organizations or non-profits to track and help children engaged in these types of labor.

== See also ==
- Human rights in Uzbekistan
