= Elena Urlaeva =

Uzbek human rights activist

Elena Urlaeva (born 1957) is an Uzbek human rights activist. She is the president of the Human Rights Alliance of Uzbekistan. She focuses on "document[ing] the practice of forced labour in the cotton industry." According to the BBC, "Urlaeva's persistent work contributed to an international campaign which ultimately led major global brands to join a boycott of Uzbek cotton."

Urlaeva was arrested on May 31, 2015, in Chinaz. Human Rights Watch reported that "Police and doctors forcibly sedated Elena Urlaeva and then subjected her to a body cavity search, x-rays, and other abuse."

The Solidarity Center reported that Urlaeva was "detained against her will in a psychiatric hospital in Tashkent" in May 2016, "for more than a month".

On March 1, 2017, according to Anti-Slavery International, Urlaeva was "arrested [...], beaten by Uzbekistan police and detained in a psychiatric prison on forced medical treatment." Reuters further reported she had explained her situation in a video, days before she was scheduled to speak in front of the World Bank, the International Labour Organization and the International Trade Union Confederation. She was released from the hospital after 23 days.
