= Igor Rotar =

Russian journalist (born 1965)

Igor Rotar (born 1965) is a Russian journalist. From 2003 to early 2007 he was the Central Asian news correspondent for Forum 18, a human rights organization based in Norway that promotes religious freedom. He is a Russian citizen.

== Background ==
Rotar is from Moscow, but as correspondent for "Nezavisimaya Gazeta" in the 1990s he covered events in the Civil War in Tajikistan.

== 2005 detainment ==
The Immigration Service and Border Guards of the Government of Uzbekistan detained Rotar on 11 August 2005. Rotar's plane took off from Bishkek, Kyrgyzstan and arrived at Tashkent Airport at 10:25 a.m. Amnesty International condemned the incident, saying his "detention is part of a wave of intimidation and harassment of journalists and human rights defenders by the Uzbekistani authorities that escalated following the events in Andijan in May this year." Holly Cartner, Europe and Central Asia director for Human Rights Watch, said, "We are deeply concerned for Rotar's safety. He should be allowed to contact his organization and a lawyer, and should be released immediately."

== Religious freedom conference ==
Rotar spoke at a conference on "Religious Freedom and State Policy in Central Asia" on 11 January 2007. The conference, hosted by the Russia and Eurasia Program of Center for Strategic and International Studies (CSIS) and the U.S. Commission on International Religious Freedom, also featured Eric McGlinchey, assistant professor of government and politics at George Mason University and Catherine Cosman, senior policy analyst for the OSCE region at USCIRF. Cory Welt, a fellow at CSIS and deputy director of its Russia and Eurasia Program, served as the moderator.

Rotar criticized Akromiya and Hizb-ut-Tahrir, Islamist organizations, calling them "enemies of the United States and Western civilization."

== Works ==
- Kyrgyzstan: Officials call for police to close embattled Baptist church
- Kazakhstan: More Planned Restrictions on Religious Freedom
- Uzbekistan: How many forced closures of religious communities?
- The Islamist Underground in Southern Kyrgyzstan
- Resurgence of Islamic Radicalism in Tajikistan's Ferghana Valley
- Why Extremism is on the Rise In Uzbekistan
- Terrorism in Uzbekistan: A Self-Made Crisis
- What Lies Ahead For Tajikistan?
- Hizb ut-Tahrir Today
- Hizb ut-Tahrir in Central Asia
- The Islamic Movement Of Uzbekistan: A Resurgent IMU?
