= Alisher Karamatov =

Uzbekistani activist

- Occupation: rural development activism
- Known for: Amnesty International prisoner of conscience

Alisher Karamatov is a currently-imprisoned Uzbekistani rural development activist. Amnesty International considers him a prisoner of conscience and named him a 2011 "priority case".

Before his arrest, Karmatov was an activist with the Human Rights Society of Uzbekistan in Guliston, Sirdaryo Province. On 29 April 2006, Karmatov was arrested along with fellow activist Azam Farmonov and charged with extortion. The two later reported torture by security forces, including partial suffocation with a disconnected gas mask and beatings on the legs and heels. Human Rights Watch condemned the trial and stated that it "appear[ed] to be a politically motivated effort to stop their human rights work" in keeping with a recent pattern of suspicious charges against human rights workers. Front Line also described the arrests as politically motivated and "part of an ongoing campaign against human rights defenders in Uzbekistan". Amnesty International likewise condemned the charges and called for the "immediate and unconditional release" of Karamatov and Farmonov. Uzbekistani government officials, however, denied that the extortion charges were politically motivated.

Both men were convicted and sentenced to nine years in prison. In 2011, Amnesty International reported that Karamatov "had been subjected to torture, beatings and humiliation by prison guards since 2007 while held at Karshi prison camp and had lost nearly half his body weight." In October 2008, he was transferred to Sangorodok, a prison hospital facility near Tashkent, where he was treated for tuberculosis. His wife visited in a month later and reported that he was in poor health, with low body weight and difficulty eating; a prison doctor confirmed that Karmatov had tuberculosis in both lungs. His wife alleged that he continued to be mistreated by prison guards, being forced to stand in freezing temperatures for hours on 8 December 2008 without a hat or coat.
