= Siege of Sloviansk =

2014 siege during the Donbas war

Coordinates: 48.8700°N 37.6250°E

- Part of the war in Donbas
Date	12 April 2014 – 5 July 2014 (2 months, 3 weeks and 2 days)
Location	Sloviansk, Donetsk Oblast, Ukraine
Result	Ukrainian victory
Territorial changes	Withdrawal of Russia's DPR People's Militia to the city of Donetsk

Belligerents
Ukraine	Donetsk People's Republic; Russia (Note: Claimed by Ukraine.)

Commanders and leaders
Oleksandr Turchynov; Petro Poroshenko; Arsen Avakov; Serhii Kulchytskyi †; Stepan Poltorak; Dmytro Yarosh; Maksym Shapoval; Valentyn Nalyvaichenko	Vyacheslav Ponomarev; Vladimir Pavlenko; Igor Strelkov; Arsen Pavlov; Vladimir Zhoga; Alexander Khodakovsky; Sergei Zhurikov † ("Romashka"); Alexander Mozhaev ("Babay" or "Bogeyman")

Units involved
Armed Forces of Ukraine: Ground Forces; 17th Tank Brigade; Air Force; Airmobile Forces; 95th Airmobile Brigade; 25th Airborne Brigade; 80th Air Assault Brigade; Internal Affairs Ministry: National Guard; 16th Regiment; 27th Pechersk Brigade; Militsiya (Police); Security Service (SBU): SBU Alpha Group; Right Sector: Ukrainian Volunteer Corps	Donbass People's Militia: Pro-Russian local volunteers; Cossack National Guard; (Russia) Russian volunteers; (Chechnya) Kadyrovtsy; 1st Sloviansk Brigade; Russian Orthodox Army; Somalia Battalion; Sparta Battalion; Russian Armed Forces: 45th Guards Spetsnaz Regiment (claimed by Ukraine)

Strength
15,000+ 160 tanks 230 APCs; 150+ artillery pieces 20 helicopters 2+ other aircraft	800–1,000 fighters 6 APCs

Casualties and losses
51 soldiers killed 127 soldiers wounded 40 soldiers captured 2 SBU agents killed 3 SBU agents captured 1 police chief captured 4 Mi-24 helicopters shot down 2 Mi-8 helicopters shot down 1 An-30 shot down 3 Mi-24 helicopters damaged 2 Mi-8 helicopters damaged 1 An-30 damaged	54 militants killed 200+ militants wounded 4 captured 1+ tank 6 APCs
- ~20 civilians killed from 13 April to 26 May. Unknown number from 27 May to 5 July. 17 civilians and foreigners missing or kidnapped. Four Pentecostal Church members executed. 1 Italian photojournalist and 1 Russian interpreter killed.

The siege of Sloviansk was conducted by Ukraine between 12 April 2014 and 5 July 2014. It began when Sloviansk was seized by the fifty-strong unit of heavily armed Russian militants led by Russian citizen Igor Girkin. Following three months of heavy fighting between the Armed Forces of Ukraine and the separatist and Russian forces, the Ukrainian government retook the city as the pro-Russia rebels retreated to Donetsk. The engagement in Sloviansk marked the first military engagement of the War in Donbas.

On 12 April 2014, as unrest grew in eastern Ukraine following the 2014 Ukrainian revolution, masked men in fatigues, armed with Kalashnikov assault rifles, took over the town and began to fortify it. They claimed to be local fighters of the Donetsk People's Republic, but were actually Russian Armed Forces 'volunteers' under the command of Russian GRU colonel Igor Girkin ('Strelkov'). In response, the Ukrainian Yatsenyuk Government created the first Anti-Terrorist Operations zone (ATO) and launched a series of counter-offensives against the insurgents, resulting in a standoff and violent skirmishes. Girkin later acknowledged that his men's seizure of Sloviansk sparked what would become the Donbas War.

As tensions in the city increased, the insurgents began to take journalists and others captive, instigating a hostage crisis. The Security Service of Ukraine said on 18 April that "Sloviansk remains the hottest point in the region." On 20 April, Right Sector was ordered by acting President Oleksandr Turchinov to sabotage an insurgent-controlled television tower, leading to the first combat fatalities. By June, roughly 40% of the city's population had fled. On 5 July, after the insurgents had retreated to Donetsk City, Ukrainian authorities retook control of the city.

== History ==
=== Seizure of government buildings ===
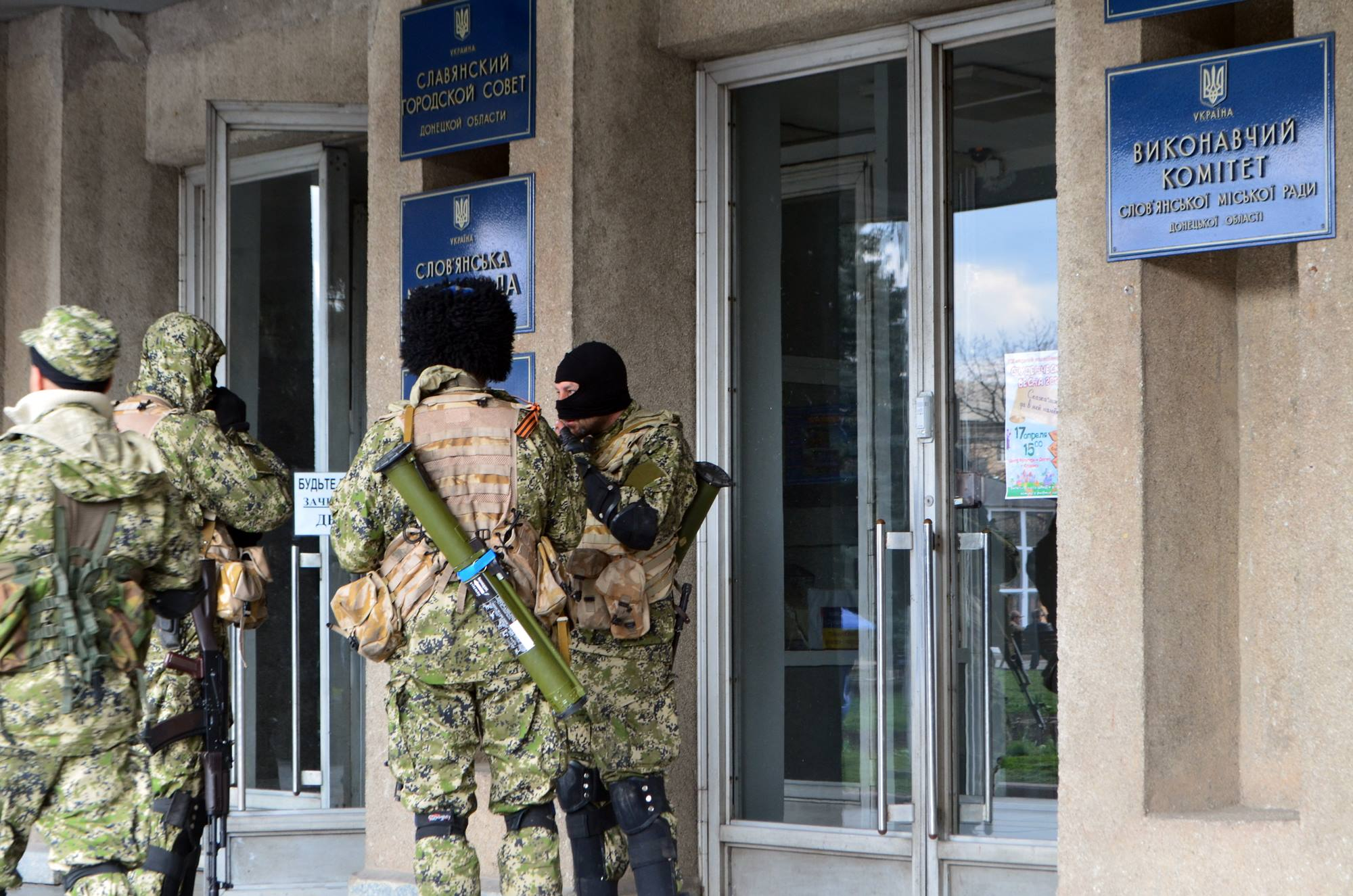
DPR-affiliated Cossack National Guard occupying Sloviansk city council, armed with Kalashnikov rifles and RPG-26 rocket launchers.

On 12 April, a fifty-strong unit of heavily armed Russian militants captured Sloviansk's administration building, police station, and Security Service of Ukraine (SBU) building, and set up roadblocks with the help of local armed activists. The unit were Russian Armed Forces 'volunteers' under the command of Russian GRU colonel Igor Girkin ('Strelkov'). They had been sent from Russian-occupied Crimea and wore no insignia. According to the Ukrainian Interior Ministry, gunmen fired indiscriminately on the administration building. Raiding the police armoury, the militants seized at least 400 handguns and 20 automatic weapons. "The aim of the takeover was the guns," a Ukrainian police statement said. "They are giving these guns to participants in the protest in Sloviansk.". After takeover of the city by militants, Sloviansk mayor Nelya Shtepa briefly appeared at an occupied police station and expressed support for the militants. Others gathered outside the building and similarly voiced their support. They told Ukrainian journalists who were reporting on the situation to "go back to Kyiv". Nelya Shtepa was later arrested by the insurgents, and replaced by the self-proclaimed "people's mayor" Vyacheslav Ponomarev.

Girkin said that this action sparked the Donbas War. He said "I'm the one who pulled the trigger of war. If our unit hadn't crossed the border, everything would have fizzled out, like in Kharkiv, like in Odessa". He explained that "nobody there wanted to fight" until his unit seized Sloviansk.

=== Government response ===
The following morning the Ukrainian government announced a counter-terrorism operation in the city. An ultimatum was given for the separatists to disarm and surrender to authorities within 48 hours.

Police began the operation by clearing a highway checkpoint controlled by separatists. A group of insurgents exited their vehicle and opened fire on the Ukrainian police, killing two SBU officers and injuring several Ukrainian military personnel. One separatist was also killed in the shootout, while the remainder fled into the woods. The car the gunmen were in had a Poltava Oblast license plate, which was traced to the private security firm Yavir. In an unrelated shootout in the city itself, two people were shot dead by an assailant in plainclothes, and another was wounded.

By the next day Sloviansk was reported to be under pro-Russian control, with more important government buildings and other areas taken by the militants. The Ukrainian army ground forces were deployed on the same day, after the separatists declined the ultimatum to lay down their arms. Two civilians were shot and killed at point blank range by pro-Russian militants in a car in Sloviansk; another one was wounded.

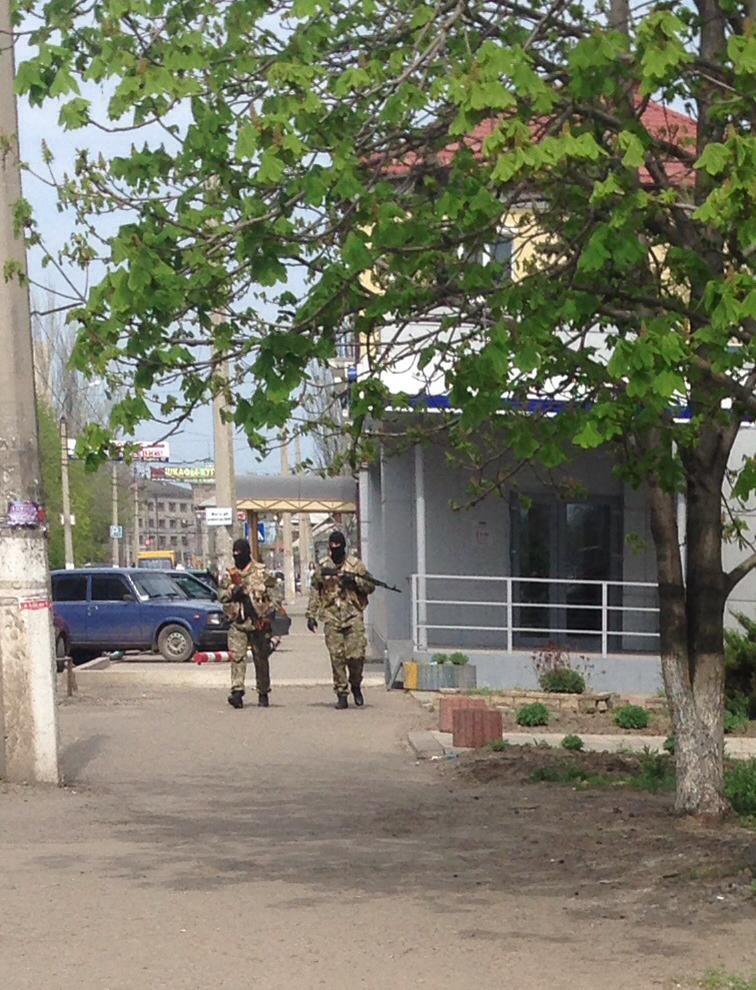
Masked armed men walking around the city

=== First offensive ===
Ukrainian forces launched their first military offensive to regain control of the Kramatorsk regional air base, using transport helicopters and armoured vehicles. Militants attempted to regain control of the airport, resulting in heavy fighting, but were not successful. Russian media estimated that this clash resulted in between four and eleven deaths. The leader of the government military operation, General Vasyl Krutov, was attacked by pro-Russian sympathizers after addressing a crowd demonstrating in front of the air base. Ukrainian armoured units were reported to be encircling Sloviansk to blockade all approach routes.

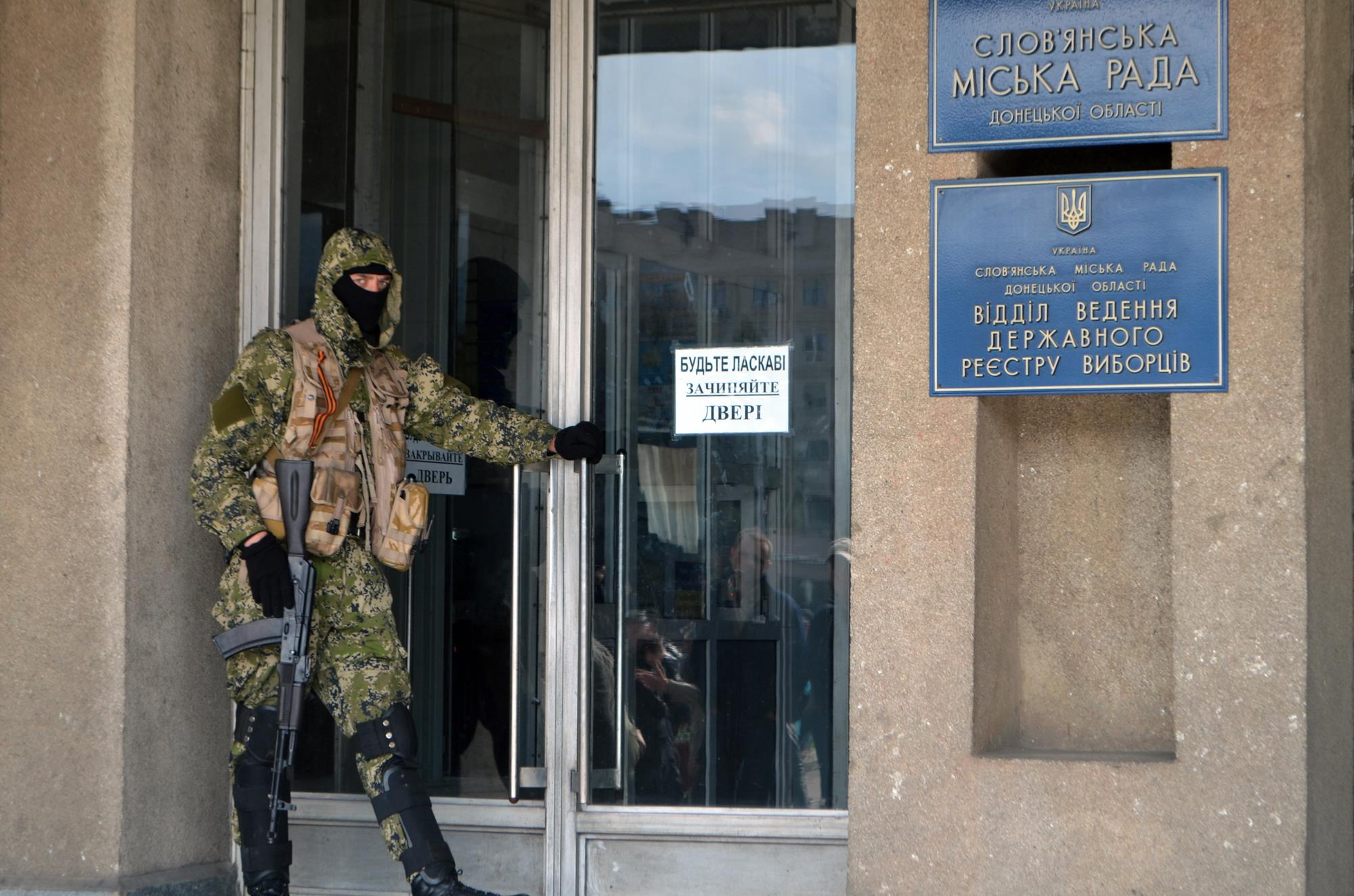
Armed militiamen occupying the council building on 14 April.

First Deputy Prime Minister Vitaly Yarema claimed that elements of the 45th Russian airborne division were seen in the Sloviansk area on 16 April. Six Ukrainian armoured vehicles drove through Sloviansk bearing Russian flags, after their crews had apparently defected to the separatist cause. The 25th Airborne Brigade that had been blockading Sloviansk was then disbanded on orders of Ukraine's president. The government announced that the soldiers responsible would be court martialled.

On 18 April, Sloviansk "people's mayor" Vyacheslav Ponomarev announced a "hunt" for Ukrainian speakers in the Donetsk region, commanding the militants to report suspicious activity, especially if they heard that the Ukrainian language was used.

Ukrainian media claimed that the Zhytomyr Armoured Brigade recaptured two of the six armoured vehicles near Kramatorsk late on 18 April. No fatalities were recorded while one separatist was wounded. Following negotiations, a compromise was reached to return the remaining four BMDs to the Ukrainian military, but an official from the Ministry of Defence announced that the vehicles were still in the hands of the rebels as of 23 April.

In a later interview, Igor Strelkov, the commander of the pro-Russian forces at Sloviansk, claimed that they had six armoured vehicles, including a BMD-1, BMD-2, and a mortar carrier.

=== Easter truce ===
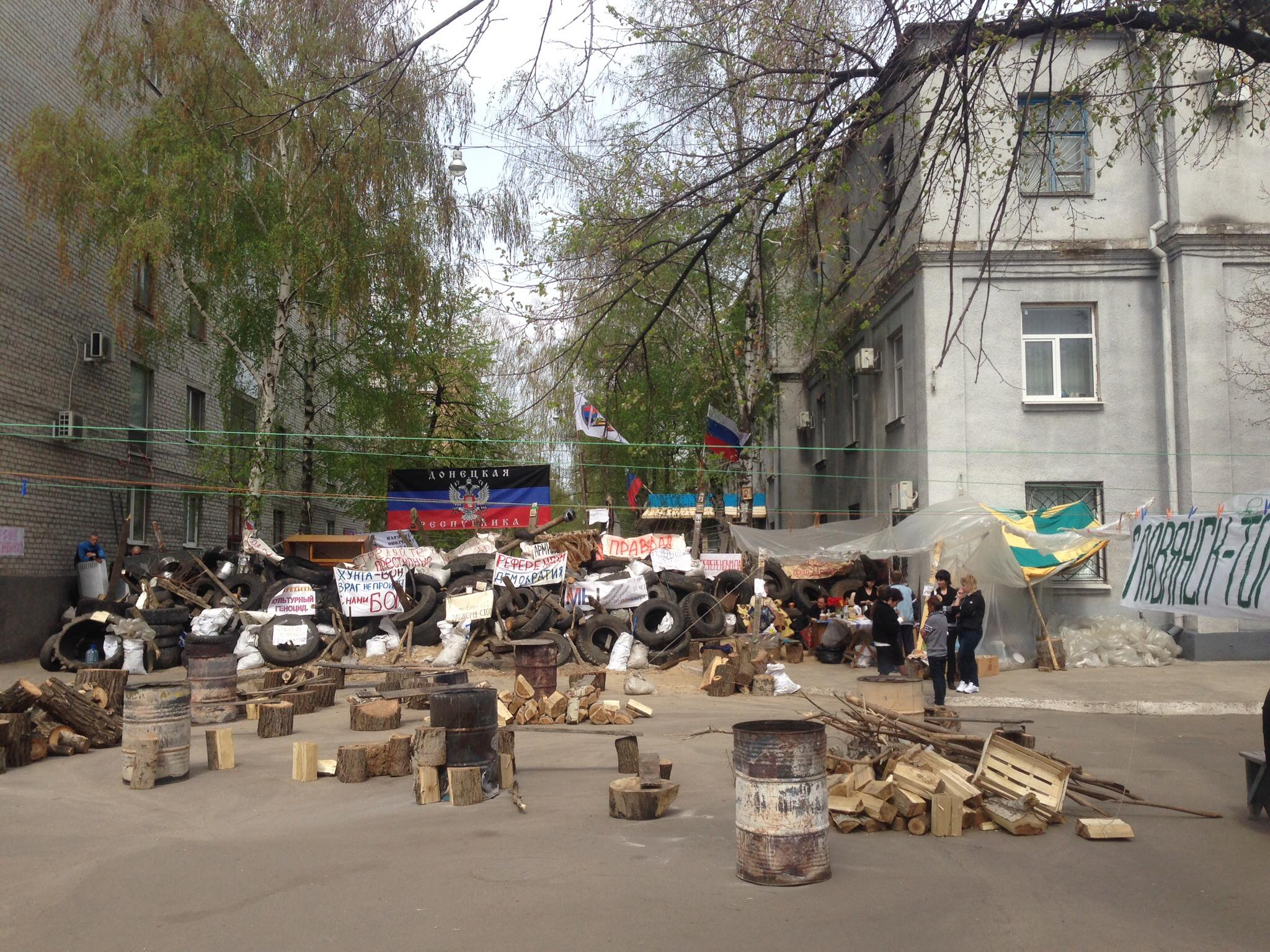
Barricade in the city

A truce for Easter was called by the Ukrainian government, which promised to temporarily halt military action in eastern Ukraine on 19 April.

Pro-Russian members of the Donbass People's Militia began a pogrom targeting the Romani population of the town. According to the International Renaissance Foundation, a Ukrainian NGO, separatist militiamen entered houses inhabited by Romanis, beat the residents, including women and children, and stole their property. The militants claimed they were acting on orders from "people's mayor" and militant leader Vyacheslav Ponomarev. Reports of the attacks were confirmed by Prime Minister Yatsenyuk, as well as a heightened level of xenophobic rhetoric at separatist rallies. Prime Minister Yatsenyuk said that the government will not tolerate incitement of ethnic hatred and instructed law enforcement agencies to identify those involved in the attacks on Romani. According to Ponomarev, he held talks with Romani who he alleged were involved in drug trafficking, and "removed them from the city." Ponomarev said the incidents were not attacks on Romani, but rather "cleaning drugs out of the city."

Separatists kidnapped Euromaidan activist and journalist Irma Krat who had arrived in the city to cover the conflict. They later paraded her blindfolded in front of the press.

On 20 April, 20 Right Sector members led by Dmytro Yarosh were covertly sent by acting Ukrainian President Oleksandr Turchynov to destroy the transformer of the Slavyansk television station on Karachun mountain. When their four-car convoy attempted to pass an insurgent-controlled checkpoint, a gunfight broke out, leading to the first combat fatalities of the conflict. Subsequently, the insurgents' claimed that they were attacked by Right Sector, but this was denied by the Kyiv government until two years later, when Dmytro Yarosh admitted that it was true. The two accounts continue to differ on which side shot first.

Pro-Russian civilians in Sloviansk, 13 April 2014

The pro-Russian separatists in Sloviansk claimed to have confiscated firearms including a German World War II-era MG-42 machine gun, a night vision device, aerial photos of Sloviansk, military uniforms, camping tools, US cash, and an alleged Right Sector business card of presidential candidate Dmytro Yarosh. Right Sector symbols including a medallion were also claimed to have been found. Right Sector spokesman Artem Skoropadsky denied the group's involvement in the attack, and blamed Russian special forces for it. "We don't have ID cards with numbers. We only have ID cards with letters, where we mention the department where the person works," said Boryslav Bereza, head of the information department for Right Sector. CNN called the phone number on the calling card and reached a woman who expressed surprise at the situation. She said that she was in Kyiv and had no relation to anyone in Right Sector. Viktoriya Siumar, deputy head of Ukraine's National Security Council, said the shooting was being investigated, but that there were indications that it was "an argument between local criminal groups".

Sky News correspondent Katie Stallard said there were inconsistencies in the separatists' accounts and there was no coherent evidence to back up their claims. Daniel Sandford of the BBC described the evidence presented as "dubious".

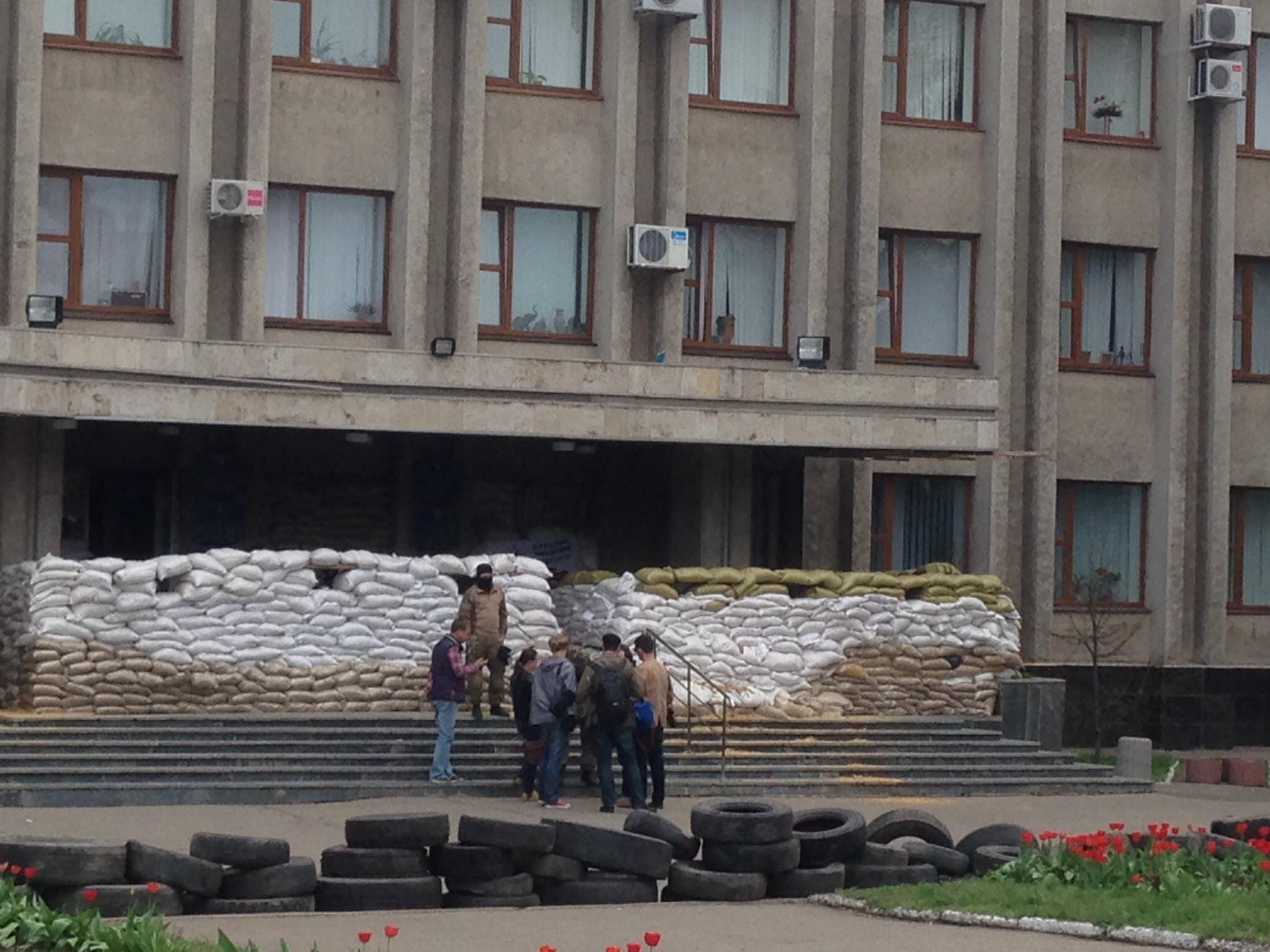
Barricades at entrance to a captured government building

The video released by Russian TV which claimed to show the identifying badges of the Right Sector turned out to have been filmed ten hours before the actual attack took place, as evidenced by the time stamp, which the Russian camera crew forgot to remove.

The Ukrainian Interior Ministry said at least three separatists were killed and three wounded in what it suspected might have been an incident set up by Russian agents. "Armed lawbreakers and saboteurs who are terrorizing the local population around Slaviansk ... have turned to cynical provocation," the SBU security service said in a statement, describing the incident as a "staged attack". No group was present "other than the saboteurs and crime figures, supported and armed by officers of Russia's GRU" military intelligence, the SBU added. They also noted "One cannot but suspect the speed with which camera crews from Russian TV stations appeared at the scene of the shooting, and the obviously staged subject matter of news reports in the Russian media." The alleged Dmytro Yarosh business card was widely mocked on Ukrainian and Russian social media. In 2016, on the second anniversary of the attack, Dmytro Yarosh talked to Censor.net, corroborating that he did in fact lead the attack (though the actual combat leader was an unnamed Afghan national), and gave a detailed account of it.

Following the incident, "people's mayor" Ponomarev appealed to Russia to intervene militarily. Ponomarev then instituted a curfew in the city.

It was later reported that the man killed at the checkpoint was Pavel Pavelko, a resident of the surrounding area.

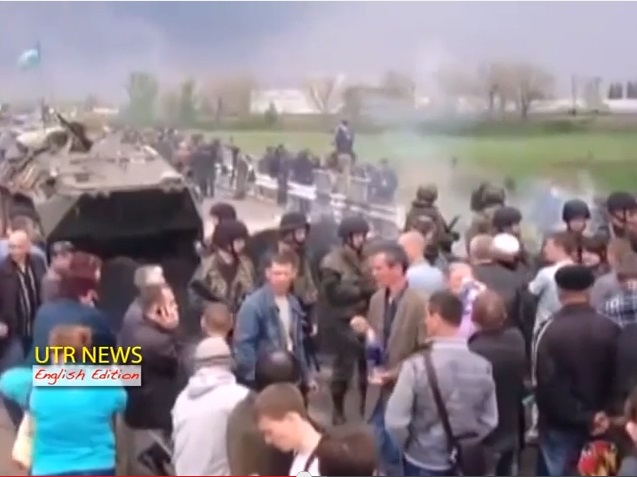
Civilians block Ukrainian military near Sloviansk, April 2014

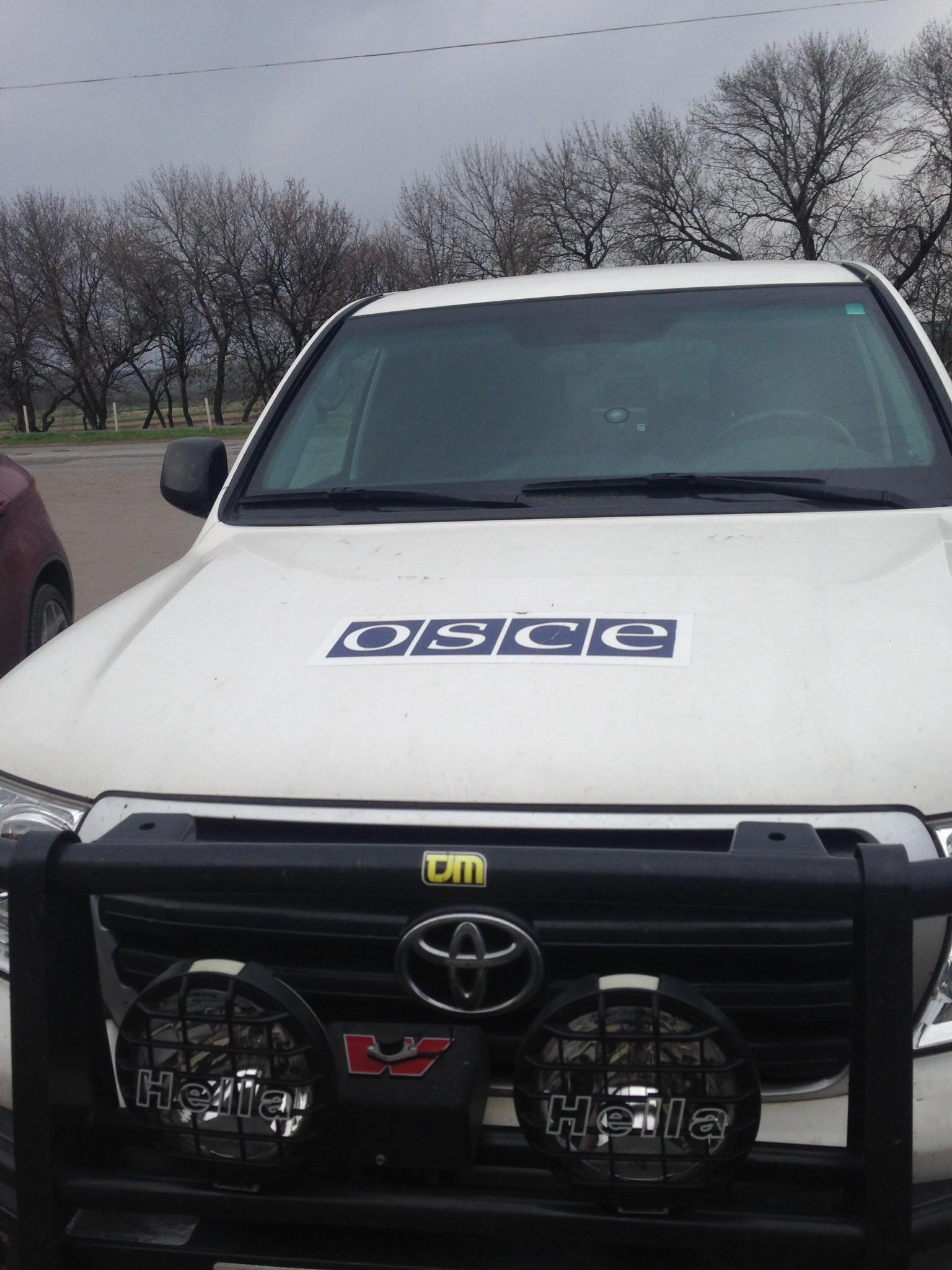
Vehicle near Sloviansk with Organization for Security and Co-operation in Europe (OSCE) markings

OSCE monitors were barred from the city by the separatists on 21 April. An OSCE team "has been in Donetsk but has not yet made progress," one diplomat said. "They are trying to get back into Slovyansk, but pro-Russian demonstrators have been blocking the way." An OSCE assessment released Monday described the situation as "very tense" in Donetsk and as "deteriorating" in Sloviansk, where "the entire town is under the control of armed groups."

Ukrainian officials distributed photos to the U.N and U.S. councils allegedly showing that pro-Russian militants were undercover Russian special forces. Other photos showed militants equipped and dressed the same as Russian soldiers in Crimea.

A Ukrainian military surveillance plane was damaged by small arms fire as it was on a reconnaissance flight over Sloviansk on 21 April, but safely made an emergency landing. None of the crew members were hurt. American journalist Simon Ostrovsky from Vice News was held captive by militants in the city.

=== Military operation resumes ===
On 23 April Ukraine's Interior Ministry said it had cleared separatist forces out of the nearby city of Sviatohirsk and that no one was injured. "During the anti-terrorism operation by special forces, the city was freed," the ministry said in a statement posted on its website. "Currently Sviatohirsk and its surroundings are being patrolled by police."

Ponomarev promised to prevent presidential elections in Ukraine at any cost. He said, "We will take all necessary measures so that elections in the southeast do not take place". Asked how he would accomplish this, he responded, "We'll take somebody as hostage and hang him by the balls." He also promised to destroy dissent, calling it "a harsh truth of life."

On 24 April, Ukrainian troops took control of three checkpoints surrounding the city, and according to the Interior Ministry, five separatists were killed and one police officer wounded in the attacks. The checkpoints were burned. Ukrainian forces distributed leaflets to residents of Sloviansk encouraging them to remain peaceful, and the Ministry reported that Ponomarev had announced that anyone seen with the leaflet would be "shot on the spot."

The leadership of the Donetsk People's Republic told Interfax-Ukraine that "a combined arms operation has been launched in Sloviansk. This means only one thing: a civil war." Ukrainian officials said that the counter-insurgency operation intended to retake all of Sloviansk the same day, but an increased threat of a Russian invasion halted the operation – Russian forces moved to within 10 kilometres (6.2 mi) of the Ukrainian border. The government confirmed seven were killed during the operation.

Ukrainian Forces surrounded Sloviansk supported by multiple armoured columns, and warned civilians to stay indoors ahead of a planned offensive on 25 April. The pro-Russian militant commander Ponomarev threatened to turn Sloviansk into a "Stalingrad" if Ukrainian troops were to enter the town. He also reported that only one checkpoint to the east of Sloviansk remained under separatist control, while the rest had been captured the previous day.

=== Government blockade ===
Ukrainian authorities said that the second phase of the military operation in Sloviansk would include blockading the city to prevent any reinforcements from entering.

In the city, it was reported that pro-Russian militants had beaten children whom they caught photographing a separatist checkpoint. The news caused a backlash in residents' opinions of the militants. BBC journalist Natalia Antelava was threatened at gunpoint by members of the Donbass People's Militia while attempting to interview locals.

Russian media, citing Russian Ministry of Defense analysis, reported that Ukrainian forces planned to wipe out the entire population of the city; this was denounced as propaganda in the Ukrainian press. On 26 April, the Ukrainian troops blockading the city began erecting checkpoints on roads leading to Sloviansk.

On 28 April, self-proclaimed "deputy mayor" of Sloviansk, Igor Perepechayenko, was arrested by SBU officers. Officials claimed Perepechayenko had been establishing contact with the General staff of the Russian Armed Forces and the GRU, and was arrested at the Donetsk airport while returning from a flight from Moscow.

Residents reported that gunmen from the Donbas militia began extorting shop owners in the local market for "rent" and had begun stealing expensive cars.

=== Second offensive ===
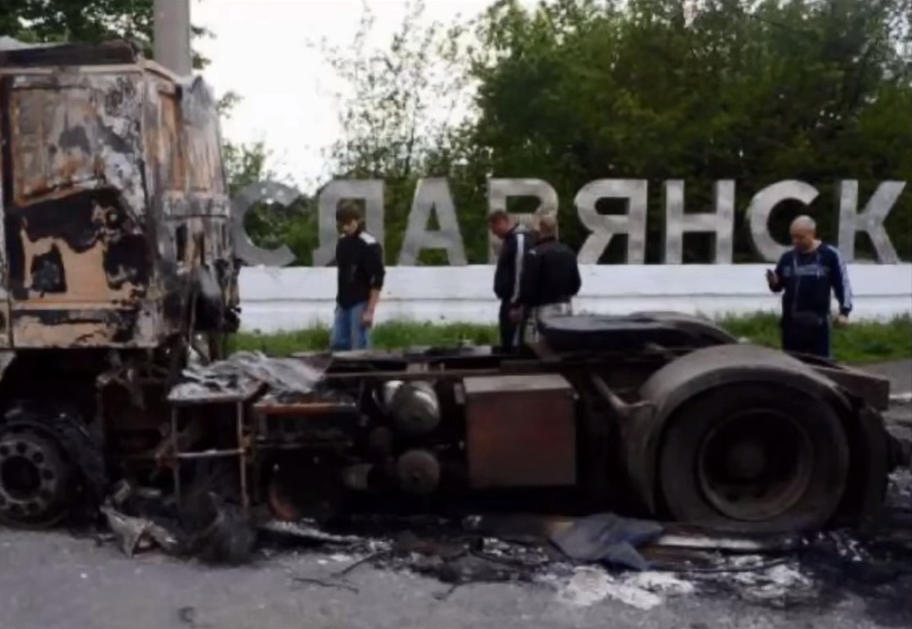
Locals look at a destroyed truck next to the Sloviansk sign

During the early morning on 2 May, Ukrainian forces launched a large-scale operation to retake the city. There were reports of gunfire, explosions, and a military helicopter opening fire. Separatists said one helicopter had been shot down, and one of the pilots captured. A commander at a separatist checkpoint told the Russian News & Information Agency that government forces took control of another of the roadblocks on the outskirts of Sloviansk, as well as the city's television broadcasting centre. A police station was reportedly re-captured, while the city centre remained quiet. Several armoured vehicles were seen outside the city. Separatist authorities claim that three militants and two civilians were killed in the clashes. The Ukrainian Ministry of Internal Affairs reported that up to nine checkpoints around Sloviansk had been seized. They also acknowledged the shooting down of two Mi-24 helicopters and the death of two airmen. Seven servicemen were wounded. The pilot of one of the Mi-24s, badly wounded, was captured by pro-Russian forces.

The fighting died down by afternoon, but by the evening separatists launched a counteroffensive that killed two Ukrainian paratroopers at Andriivka, southwest of Sloviansk. Ukrainian National Guard Commander Stepan Poltorak said that the town had been practically cleared of terrorists.

After the helicopters were shot down, Ukrainian authorities stated that this had been done with Russian man-portable air-defense systems (MANPADS). Jane's Information Group editor and military analyst Nicholas de Larrinaga says that the use of "MANPADS outside of formal armed forces has historically been very rare" and that the type used was an Igla model, either the earlier 9K310 Igla-1 (SA-16 'Gimlet'), or the later 9K38 Igla (SA-18 'Grouse'), which are in service with both the Ukrainian and Russian armed forces. An independent Russian military journalist, Pavel Felgenhauer, said that the effective usage of MANPADS in Ukraine proved not only that the people who used it were specially trained, but that the weaponry was supplied by Russia. According to Felgenhauer, Soviet MANPADS would not be functioning right away, as they were equipped with a short-lived battery. On the other hand, MANPADS of the Ukrainian army (type Igla) would not hit a Ukrainian helicopter, because such systems have a friend-or-foe identification ability.

During the fighting, about one hundred civilians gathered outside the city hall to appeal for Russian intervention.

On 5 May, Interior Minister Arsen Avakov announced that Ukrainian soldiers were killed in fighting with pro-Russian separatists on the outskirts of the city, and said the separatists, numbering as many as 800, fired "large-caliber weapons," and "used mortars and other equipment." Four Ukrainian soldiers were killed and twenty more were wounded in the fighting. He claimed 30 "terrorists" were killed, and dozens wounded. Strelkov, a Donbas Militia leader, told the Russian state media outlet RIA Novosti that "We lost around 10, including peaceful residents, and 20–25 were wounded." According to a statement on the Interior Ministry's website, separatists used unarmed civilians as human shields as they attacked Ukrainian troops and set fire to nearby buildings, and fired at a minibus carrying wounded people from the battlefield, killing an officer in a special police unit who was escorting it. Pro-Russian insurgents also shot down a Ukrainian M-24 helicopter in Sloviansk using a heavy machine gun.

=== Post-referendum ===
Following the referendum on the status of Donetsk Oblast, on 12 May, Donbass People's Militia leader Igor Girkin declared himself "Supreme Commander" of the Donetsk People's Republic. In his decree, he demanded all military stationed in the region swear an oath of allegiance to him within 48 hours, and said that war would be waged upon those who did not. This was followed on 15 May by a deputy of Strelkov issuing a second ultimatum at a press conference, giving Ukraine 24 hours to withdraw its troops from Donetsk. On the 23rd, he urged all residents of the city to evacuate, saying that artillery would be used.

Throughout this time, attacks by both sides continued. These included a separatist attack on a Ukrainian convoy near Kramatorsk on 13 May which killed seven Ukrainian paratroopers and a disputed number of separatists, and mortar attacks on Ukrainian positions at Mount Karachun, near Sloviansk, on 19 and 20 May leaving one Ukrainian soldier dead and seven wounded.

Ukrainian forces used artillery fire against Sloviansk and surrounding villages; pro-Russian sources said that three villages including Semenivka were damaged by Ukrainian artillery fire on 19 May, and it was also reported that two civilians were killed by artillery fire in Sloviansk itself on 26 May, and three on 7 June. The following day, 120 children were evacuated from the city.

The Ukrainian military also used both helicopters and fixed-wing aircraft over Sloviansk throughout May and June which suffered a number of losses, the most serious being the shooting down of an Mi-8 helicopter on 29 May, killing 12 including the helicopter's crew, six representatives of the Berkut special task force, and Ukrainian National Guard general Serhii Kulchytskiy. Two helicopters were downed on 3 June, an An-30 surveillance aircraft was shot down on 6 June, and another helicopter on 24 June, a day after the agreement to a week-long ceasefire, killing all nine on board.

Separatists made repeated attacks on the checkpoints that the Ukrainian forces had set up on roads leading out of Sloviansk, inflicting and suffering casualties without taking the positions. On 24 May, an attack with mortars, RPGs and small arms killed two Ukrainian soldiers, while a mortar attack on 7 June left one dead. An attack with mortars and automatic grenade launchers and mortars on 28 June killed three Ukrainian servicemen.

On 3 June, the Ukrainian military launched a new offensive against Sloviansk and the nearby village of Semenivka. The fighting left at least ten separatists and two Ukrainian soldiers dead, and 42 Ukrainian soldiers and 12 separatists were wounded, while one Ukrainian armoured personnel carrier was damaged. A Ukrainian military convoy was attacked while moving south toward Sloviansk from Izyum.

Divisions emerged within the separatist forces. On 27 May Girkin said that some of his men had engaged in looting of the city, and that in response he had had company commander Dmitry Slavov and platoon commander Nikolai Lukyanov executed. Ponomarev was dismissed from his post and arrested by Strelkov on 10 June. "The so-called people's mayor Ponomarev has been dismissed for engaging in activities incompatible with the goals and tasks of the civil administration. I cannot provide further details for now," Strelkov said in his statement.

On 21 June, a suspected agent allegedly recruited by the FSB was captured by the State Security Service near Sloviansk.

President Poroshenko declared an end to the ceasefire at the end of June, after at least 27 Ukrainian servicemen were killed during it. A renewed government offensive followed, once again using heavy artillery and airstrikes. A TV tower on Mount Karachun was destroyed by shelling. (Note: According to Interfax-Ukraine this destruction did not influence (TV channels) broadcasting as the tower was already out of service.)

=== Insurgent withdrawal ===
Map of the DPR retreat from Sloviansk and other cities

On the evening of 4 July a column of militants consisting of 24 units of heavy equipment, including a 2S9 Nona, assaulted a roadblock held by elements of the 25th Airborne Brigade near the Karachun hill. As a result of the following battle, the column was annihilated, with a T-64 tank being destroyed and several armoured vehicles damaged. The Ukrainian side lost one soldier killed and several wounded.

DPR militants retreated from Sloviansk on 5 July. According to Ukrainian president Petro Poroshenko, he personally gave the order for the Ukrainian flag to be raised over the town. Separatists and Ukrainian Interior Minister Arsen Avakov both said that a portion of the rebels, including Girkin, military commander of the DPR, were retreating from Sloviansk. Avakov claimed that the separatists were "suffering losses and surrendering", and had lost one tank and four armoured vehicles in the retreat. Associated Press quoted Andrei Purgin, a spokesman for the separatists' self-proclaimed Donetsk People's Republic, as saying the rebels were evacuating. A rebel commander said that they were falling back to Kramatorsk. Captured hostages claimed to have freed themselves from Sloviansk's main police station, and confirmed the rebel retreat. According to Girkin, 80-90 percent of his men had escaped from Sloviansk. On 11 July spokesman for the National Security and Defense Council of Ukraine Andriy Lysenko claimed Ukrainian security forces had not destroyed the retreating military column because they had received information that the separatists were using human shields.

On 5 July, the Ukrainian flag was hoisted over the city council building. Several hostages, including Mayor Nelia Shtepa, were freed. After entering the city, units of the 25th Airborne Brigade established control over the local Security Service office and the aviation college. Afterwards, Ukrainian troops advanced on Kramatorsk.

=== Aftermath ===
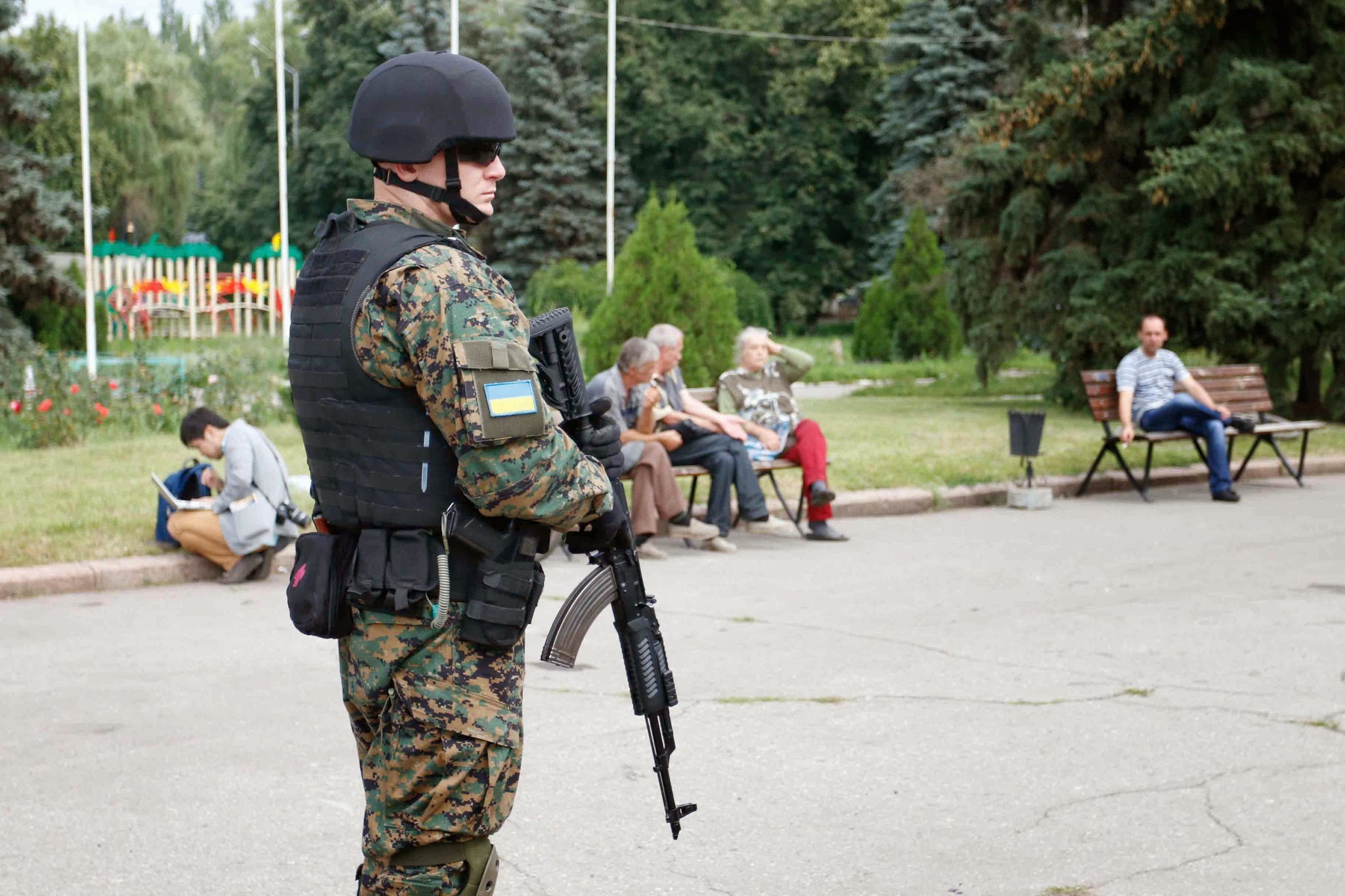
Ukrainian soldier patrolling Sloviansk, July 9

Following the liberation of Sloviansk, in the same weekend (5–6 July), government forces took control of several other towns in northern Donetsk Oblast: Kramatorsk, Druzhkivka, Kostiantynivka and Bakhmut.

On 11 July, Sloviansk's Mayor Nelya Shtepa was arrested for an "attack on the territorial integrity and inviolability of Ukraine".

On 24 July, Human Rights Watch reported that Ukrainian authorities found and exhumed a mass grave in the city.

== Hostages and abductions ==
A number of people have been abducted during the conflict, some as hostages.

Thirteen military international observers were referred to by insurgent leader Vyacheslav Ponomarev as "prisoners of war". Ponomarev warned hostages would be killed if he came under attack. As of 2 May, the Kyiv Post reported that 31 people remained missing or were hostages in Donetsk Oblast.

=== Reported abductions ===
==== Journalists ====
- Serhiy Shapoval – Journalist for the Volyn Post (released)
- Yuri Lelyavsky – Journalist for ZIK channel news, held on suspicion of being a "provocateur" (released)
- Irma Krat – Leader of Maidan's "Women Hundred", editor-in-chief of Hidden Truth TV, held for "war crimes" and "suspicion of torturing and killing a Berkut riot police officer." Residents of Sloviansk freed Krat after her captors left the city.
- Serhiy Lefter – Journalist, held on suspicion of "espionage and co-operation with Right Sector" (released)
- Yevhen Hapych – Journalist from the Ivano Frankivsk Oblast town of Kolomyia (released)
- Clarissa Ward – Journalist for CBS News (detained and released)
- Mike Giglio – Journalist for Buzzfeed (kidnapped and released)
- Simon Ostrovsky – Russian-born American journalist for Vice News, held on suspicion of being a Right Sector informant (released)
- Paul Gogo – French journalist (released)
- Cosimo Attanasio – Italian journalist (released)
- Dmitry Galko – Belarusian journalist (released)

==== Public officials ====
- Volodymyr Rybak – Horlivka city councilman (found murdered)
- Vadym Sukhono – Sloviansk City Councilman
- Nelya Shtepa – Sloviansk mayor
- Yakymov – Head of the Sloviansk medical forensics service (released)

==== Other ====
- Yuri Popravko – A 19-year-old student from Kyiv, murdered along with Rybak. His body was found in the river. Popravko's friends later admitted that Yuri was a member of the Right Sector and arrived in Slavyansk together with other Right Sector members. They brought with them arms, shot at a car that had been driving them and attacked a checkpoint with a grenade.
- Valeriy Salo – Head of the Prosvita in Krasny Lyman, captured by Donetsk Republic members. His body was found in Luhansk region along with a torched car.
- Artem Deyneha – A Sloviansk resident, he was kidnapped after he was observed setting up a webcam from the balcony of his family's apartment overlooking the occupied SBU building.
- Vitaliy Kovalchuk. He attempted to capture guns from militants in Sloviansk. Initial statements that he was a member of Right Sector were contradicted by later reports.
- Denis Grishchuk – A volunteer at the "Mystetskyi Arsenal" art center, abducted by Sloviansk separatists on 25 April. Released during insurgent withdrawal.
- Pavel Yurov – A theatre director, abducted by Sloviansk separatists on 25 April. Released during insurgent withdrawal.
- Vasily Nesterenko, a man abducted on 6 May 2014 while bringing food to the Ukrainian army.

==== International military observers ====
- German interpreter (released)
- Axel Schneider – German Colonel (released)
- German soldier (released)
- German soldier (released)
- Josef Přerovský – Czech Lieutenant colonel (released)
- Krzysztof Kobielski – Polish soldier (released)
- John Gerhard Østergaard Christensen – Danish Warrant Officer (released)
- Yngve Thomas Johansson – Swedish soldier (released for medical reasons)

==== Ukrainian military and security ====
- Five representatives of the Ukrainian armed forces were also detained along with the OSCE mission (released)
- Ponomarev and Russian media claim that separatists have captured 40 additional Ukrainian soldiers.
- Pro-Russian militants in Horlivka captured three SBU officers (LTC Rostyslav Kiyashko, MAJ Serhiy Potemsky, CPT Yevhen Verinsky), who were held in the SBU building in Sloviansk and publicly interrogated at a press conference, with a video of the interrogation being posted on YouTube. They were later released on 7 May in exchange for separatist leader Pavel Gubarev (released)
- Yuriy Zahrebelny – Prosecutor of Sloviansk (Zahrebelny was released following interrogation)
- Vitaliy Kolupai – Kramatorsk chief of police. Pro-Russian militants demanded weapons and arms in exchange for the police colonel's release
- Lieutenant-Colonel Oleg Prokhorov – Sloviansk chief of police (whereabouts unknown)

=== Murder of Volodymyr Rybak ===
Ukraine's acting president relaunched military operations against pro-Russian militants in the east after two men, one a local politician, were found tortured to death. The politician, Volodymyr Ivanovych Rybak, from the Batkivshchyna party, was found near Sloviansk. Both men had the same cause of death: "combined injuries due to torture and death by drowning while unconscious." Rybak was kidnapped by four pro-Russian militants in camouflage after he took part in a "For a United Ukraine" demonstration near the Horlivka city council building – he was found in the river with a backpack filled with sand around his back and gutted. A statement by Ukraine's SBU state security service implicated Igor Bezler and Igor Strelkov – whom it describes as senior officers in Russia's GRU military intelligence services which is leading the pro-Russian separatist movement in eastern Ukraine – in Rybak's murder.

Rybak's wife, Elena, claimed at a news conference that the checkpoints into the city of Horlivka were manned by Chechen militants, and they would not allow her to enter the city to identify his body.

Ukraine's Security Service (SBU) released a YouTube video implicating Bezler with an alleged audio recording. In it, he allegedly orders a subordinate to abduct Rybak, tie his hands and blindfold him, and then drive him to a remote place so that he could rendezvous with the captors. In the second part of the recording, Russian Military Intelligence Colonel Strelkov calls Ponomarev to take care of (Rybak's) body because it "is lying here and beginning to smell." In response, Ponomarev complies, and says he will come to take the body and "organize the burial of this rooster."

=== Abduction of Simon Ostrovsky ===
On 22 April, Simon Ostrovsky of Vice News was detained by pro-Russian separatists. "We had been looking into whether there were actual Russians involved in what's going on here – for the two days prior to me being captured," Ostrovsky said. "I had been phoning them and requesting interviews with them on that subject so maybe that's why they decided it was time to stop me." Recounting the experience, he claimed, "They beat me up as an introduction to the whole situation, blindfolded me, tied my hands behind my back," Ostrovsky said. "Then they eventually untied them and I was just hanging out in the room with the other prisoners." Ostrovsky says his captors accused him of working for the CIA and FBI, and that during his stay "a dozen other nameless detainees were ferried in and out of the cellar of the Ukraine state security (SBU) building by the pro-Russia militants" and that many had been there for up to two weeks.

When I refused to give the password to my laptop, I was smacked in the arm with a truncheon. When I was asleep on the floor, masked men came to wake me up and tell me how no one would miss me if I died, and then kicked me in the ribs as they left.

When asked of his whereabouts during a press conference, self-appointed "people's mayor" Ponomarev said "nobody abducted him, nobody is holding him hostage, he's with us now in at the SBU, preparing material and working."

Stella Khoraeva, a spokeswoman for pro-Russian insurgents, told the Associated Press that Ostrovsky was "fine" and "suspected of bad activities," but refused to explain. She added that the pro-Russian group was conducting an investigation into Ostrovsky's activities. Khoraeva then said Ostrovsky was initially captured for spying on behalf of Ukrainian ultra-nationalists. Ponomarev reciprocated this claim, saying "According to our information, he is an informer of the Right Sector." Later, she said that the insurgents had planned to take Ostrovsky, which was prompted from his "incorrect way" of reporting. "We knew where he was going and the men manning the checkpoint were told to look out for him," she said.

Ponomarev has said his arrest was "so he wouldn't put out a lot of provocative commentary, so he wouldn't conduct hostile activity on our territory. In the final analysis, he is an undesirable element in our area." When asked when he would be released, he said he would be released "when we consider it necessary for him to get out." He also reiterated that he is not a hostage, but that they were 'defining his place of stay, so to speak.' The self-styled mayor then said that Ostrovsky could be released in a trade: "We need captives. We need a bargaining chip. Many of our comrades are imprisoned. Those guys [Ukrainians] are grabbing them, then taking them to Kyiv and torturing them. So then, we're doing the very same thing. That is, in the sense that we're taking captives," said Ponomarev.

Jen Psaki, the US State Department spokeswoman, said US authorities are "deeply concerned" about the situation and are working to resolve it. "We condemn any such actions, and all recent hostage-takings in eastern Ukraine".

On 24 April, Ostrovsky was released.

=== International military observers detained ===
On 25 April near Sloviansk, the Ukrainian Foreign Ministry lost contact with military inspectors from OSCE participating states. The group, on an inspection mission under the Vienna Document on military transparency, was made up of three German soldiers, a German translator, and military observers from Czech Republic, Poland, Sweden and Denmark, a ministry spokesman said. "In Donetsk region communication has been lost with members of the OSCE military verification mission ... According to preliminary reports, they could be captured by terrorists," the director of the ministry's information policy department, Yevhen Perebyinis, said at a briefing. The Interior Ministry later confirmed that 13 people (seven members from OSCE countries, five Ukrainian military representatives, and the driver) had been taken hostage by pro-Russian militants and held in the SBU building. Ponomarev says he believes the detained military observers have a Kyiv "spy" in their group. "People who come here as observers for the European community bringing with them a real spy – that is inappropriate," Ponomarev told reporters. He also claimed the detention was due to the bus having "banned ammunition on board," and he along with Russian media accused the observers of being "NATO officers." The separatists have said they refuse to release the hostages until they meet with "competent authorities in Russia". Igor Strelkov, commander of the separatist militia, accused the monitors of being "NATO spies," and that they would only be exchanged for pro-Russian "activists" held in custody in Kyiv. On 3 May, following the second offensive on Sloviansk, the observers along with five Ukrainian observers were released. The SBU then released what they described as a tapped phone call implicating Russia in the abduction, naming specifically Vladimir Lukin and Igor Girkin.

=== OSCE special monitoring mission observers ===
On 29 May, Ponomarev admitted that he and his men were holding four OSCE observers, promising that they would be freed soon, according to Russia's Interfax news agency. He said they were detained for being "most-zealous." The OSCE said it had lost contact with one of its four-person monitoring teams in Donetsk on Monday evening. His men had previously kidnapped OSCE monitors in eastern Ukraine.

== Notable figures ==
- Alexander Mozhaev ("Babay" or "Bogeyman", Russian: Александр Иванович Можаев), a Russian military veteran from Belorechensk. Mozhaev with his distinctive beard has appeared in many circulated pictures as a member of the Donbass People's Militia in Sloviansk, and allegedly led the assault on a weapons depot in Artemivsk (today Bakhmut).

== See also ==
- Outline of the Russo-Ukrainian War
- Timeline of the 2014 pro-Russian unrest in Ukraine
- Timeline of the war in Donbas
