= Stara Rafalivka =

Stara Rafalivka Стара Рафалівка
- Village
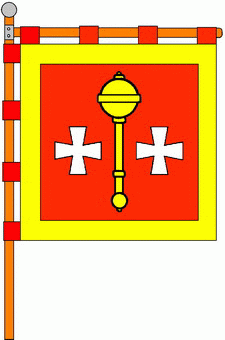
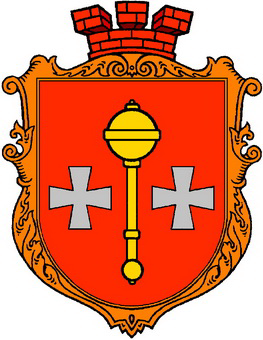
- Flag Coat of arms

- Location within Ukraine Stara Rafalivka (Ukraine)
- Coordinates: 51°22′09″N 25°51′33″E
- Country: Ukraine
- Oblast: Rivne Oblast
- Raion: Volodymyrets Raion
- Hromada: Varash urban hromada
- Founded: 1647

Area
  - Total: 1.871 km^{2} (0.722 sq mi)
- Elevation: 165 m (541 ft)

Population (2001)
  - Total: 435
  - Density: 235/km^{2} (610/sq mi)
- Time zone: UTC+2 (EET)
  - Summer (DST): UTC+3 (EEST)
- Postal code: 34354
- Area code: +380 3634

Stara Rafalivka (Ukrainian: Стара Рафалівка) is a village in Varash Raion, Rivne Oblast, Ukraine, but was formerly administered within Volodymyrets Raion. In 2001 the community had 435 residents. Postal code — 34354. KOATUU code — 5620889301.

It was the site of a gruesome massacre (60 people, including children, were killed) by Soviet partisans during World War II.
