= 5th Nuclear Power Plant Protection Battalion =

5th Nuclear Power Plant Defense Battalion
- 5-й окремий батальйон охорони ОВДО НГ (Ukrainian)
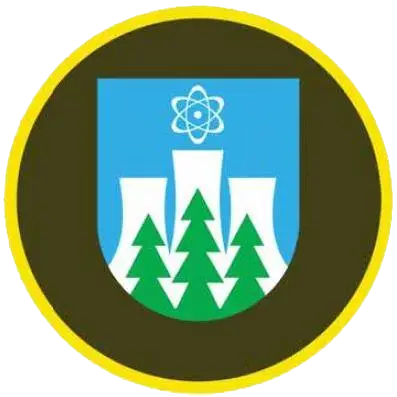
- Regimental Insignia
- Founded: 1991
- Country: Ukraine
- Allegiance: Ministry of Internal Affairs
- Branch: National Guard of Ukraine
- Type: Battalion
- Role: CBRN defense of Rivne Nuclear Power Plant
- Part of: National Guard of Ukraine
- Garrison/HQ: Varash
- Engagements: Russo-Ukrainian war: War in Donbas; Russian invasion of Ukraine

Commanders
- Current commander: Colonel Arkady Agaltsov

The 5th Nuclear Power Plant Defense Battalion is a battalion of the National Guard of Ukraine tasked with CBRN defense, specifically of the Rivne Nuclear Power Plant, and has seen action against Russian forces during the Russian invasion of Ukraine. In its current form, it was established in 1991 and is headquartered at Varash.

== History ==
The 5th Nuclear Power Plant Protection Battalion was established in 1991 as a part of the Internal Troops of Ukraine to protect and guard the Rivne Nuclear Power Plant.

In 2014, the Battalion was transferred to the National Guard of Ukraine and the personnel of the unit were deployed to the ATO zone to take part in the War in Donbas.

The 5th Nuclear Power Plant Protection Battalion saw combat during the Russian invasion of Ukraine. On 10 July 2023, a soldier of the Battalion (Volodymyr Petruk) was killed in combat. Another soldier of the battalion (Vitaly Lazarets) was killed on 23 July in Berestove. On 29 August 2023, an Anti-aircraft gunner of the battalion (Oleksandr Zarutskyi) was killed in combat. On 16 September 2023, another soldier of the battalion (Kuzka Tarasa Mykolayovych) was killed in combat. During the massive missile attack on Ukraine on 15 November 2022, the Rivne Nuclear Power Plant, under the battalion's protection, lost connection with one of the 750 kV power lines. The plant's power had to be reduced, and one of the four units was automatically shut down. On 18 December 2023, two soldiers of the battalion (Volodymyr Yuriyovych Bal and Denisyuk Vladyslav Ivanovich) were killed in Robotyne.

On 27 April 2024, the 5th Nuclear Power Plant Protection Battalion received a combat flag. On 20 August 2024, a medic (Ruslan Mykhailovych Krysa) of the Battalion was seriously wounded while operating in Kramatorsk and died of his wounds on 27 August.

== Structure ==
The structure of the battalion is as follows:

- 5th Nuclear Power Plant Protection Battalion
  - Management and Headquarters
  - Object Commandant's Office
  - 1st Special Commandant's Office
  - 2nd Special Commandant's Office
  - Special Purpose Platoon
    - Special Cargo Protection Group
    - Artillery Support Group
    - Robotic Intelligence Complexes Department
  - Combat and Logistical Support Platoon
    - Cynological Group
    - Automobile Department
  - Engineering, Technical and Communications Platoon
  - Medical Center

== Commanders ==
- Colonel Arkady Agaltsov (2017–)

== Sources ==
- Урочисте відкриття військового містечка у військовій частині 3045
- Урочисте відкриття військового містечка військової частини No. 3045
- На Рівненщину повернулися учасники АТО
- У Львові стартував черговий етап «Кубка Героїв АТО» 18.09.2106
- Кузнецовськ зустрів своїх героїв
- Новий навчальний модуль розпочато для гвардійців військової частини 3045
- Національна гвардія України на захисті Рівненської АЕС
- Військовослужбовці в\ч 3045 повернулися з зони АТО
- На Рівненщині військова частина 3045 переплатила майже 200 тис. грн за ремонт техніки
- Військові РАЕС познайомили школярів з сучасним озброєнням армії
- Військові навчально-методичні збори на майданчику Рівненської АЕС
- У гвардійців військової частини 3045 побував почесний гість // Віктор Григорович Лаврентьєв
