= Rafalivka =

Rural locality in Rivne Oblast, Ukraine

Rafalivka Рафалівка Rafałówka
- Rural settlement
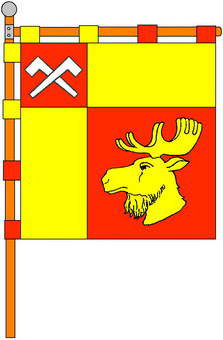
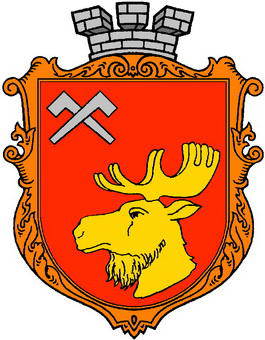
- Flag Coat of arms

- Location of Rafalivka in Ukraine Rafalivka (Ukraine)
- Coordinates: 51°18′33″N 25°59′46″E
- Country: Ukraine
- Oblast: Rivne Oblast
- Raion: Varash Raion
- Hromada: Rafalivka settlement hromada
- Founded: 1902
- Town status: 1957

Government
  - Town Head: Yuriy Bobrovnik

Area
  - Total: 12.26 km^{2} (4.73 sq mi)
- Elevation: 195 m (640 ft)

Population (2001)
  - Total: 3,278
  - Density: 267.4/km^{2} (692.5/sq mi)
- Time zone: UTC+2 (EET)
  - Summer (DST): UTC+3 (EEST)
- Postal code: 34371
- Area code: +380 3634
- Website: http://rada.gov.ua/

Rafalivka (Ukrainian: Рафалівка; Polish: Rafałówka) is a rural settlement in Varash Raion (district) of Rivne Oblast (province) in western Ukraine. Its population is 3,278 as of the 2001 Ukrainian Census. Current population: 3,434 (2022 estimate).

== History ==
The settlement was founded in 1902 as poz'izd Polytsi (Ukrainian: роз'їзд Полиці). Its name was changed to Nova Rafalivka (Ukrainian: Нова Рафалівка) in 1927. The settlement's name was again changed to its current "Rafalivka" when it acquired the status of an urban-type settlement in 1957.

On 26 January 2024, a new law entered into force which abolished the status of urban-type settlement, and Rafalivka became a rural settlement.

== See also ==
- Volodymyrets, the other urban-type settlement in Volodymyrets Raion of Rivne Oblast
