= Volodymyrets =

Rural locality in Rivne Oblast, Ukraine

Volodymyrets Володимирець Włodzimierzec
- Rural settlement
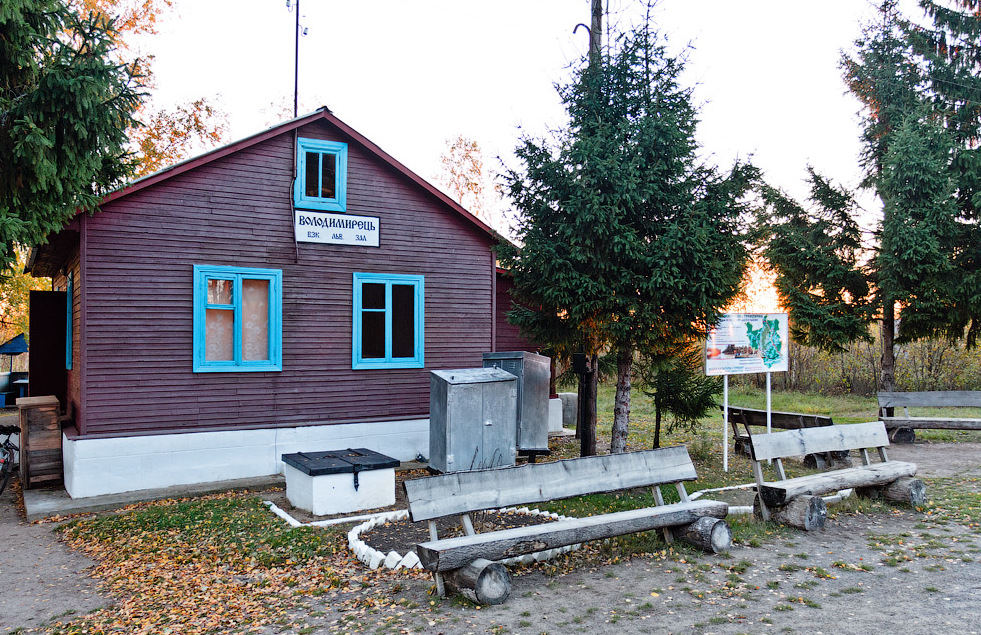
- Volodymyrets railway station

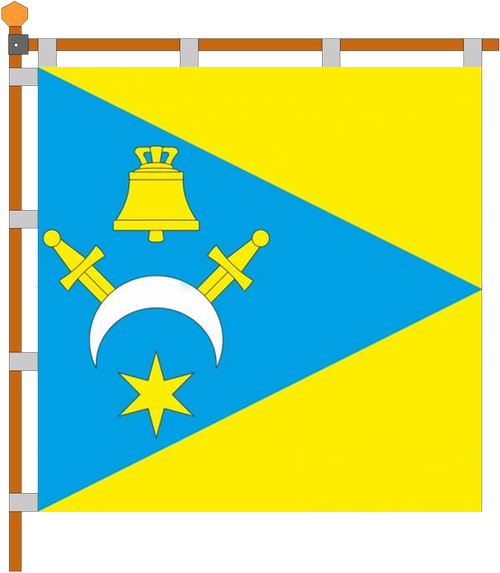
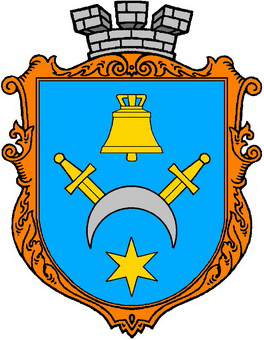
- Flag Coat of arms

- Location of Volodymyrets in Ukraine Volodymyrets (Ukraine)
- Coordinates: 51°25′15″N 26°08′42″E
- Country: Ukraine
- Oblast: Rivne Oblast
- Raion: Varash Raion
- Hromada: Volodymyrets settlement hromada
- Founded: 1183
- Town status: 1957

Government
  - Mayor: Oleksandr Osmolovych

Area
  - Total: 60.13 km^{2} (23.22 sq mi)
- Elevation: 176 m (577 ft)

Population (2001)
  - Total: 8,699
  - Density: 144.7/km^{2} (374.7/sq mi)
- Time zone: UTC+2 (EET)
  - Summer (DST): UTC+3 (EEST)
- Postal code: 34300
- Area code: +380 3634
- Website: http://volodselrada.gov.ua/

Volodymyrets (Ukrainian: Володимирець, pronounced [wɔlɔˈdɪmeret͡sʲ]; Polish: Włodzimierzec) is a rural settlement in Rivne Oblast (province) in western Ukraine. The town was also formerly he administrative center of Volodymyrets Raion (district), housing the district's local administration buildings until the raion's abolition, but is now administered within Varash Raion. Its population is 8,699 as of the 2001 Ukrainian Census. Current population: 9,315 (2022 estimate).

The settlement is located at the confluence of the Styr and Horyn rivers in the region of Volhynian Polesia.

== History ==
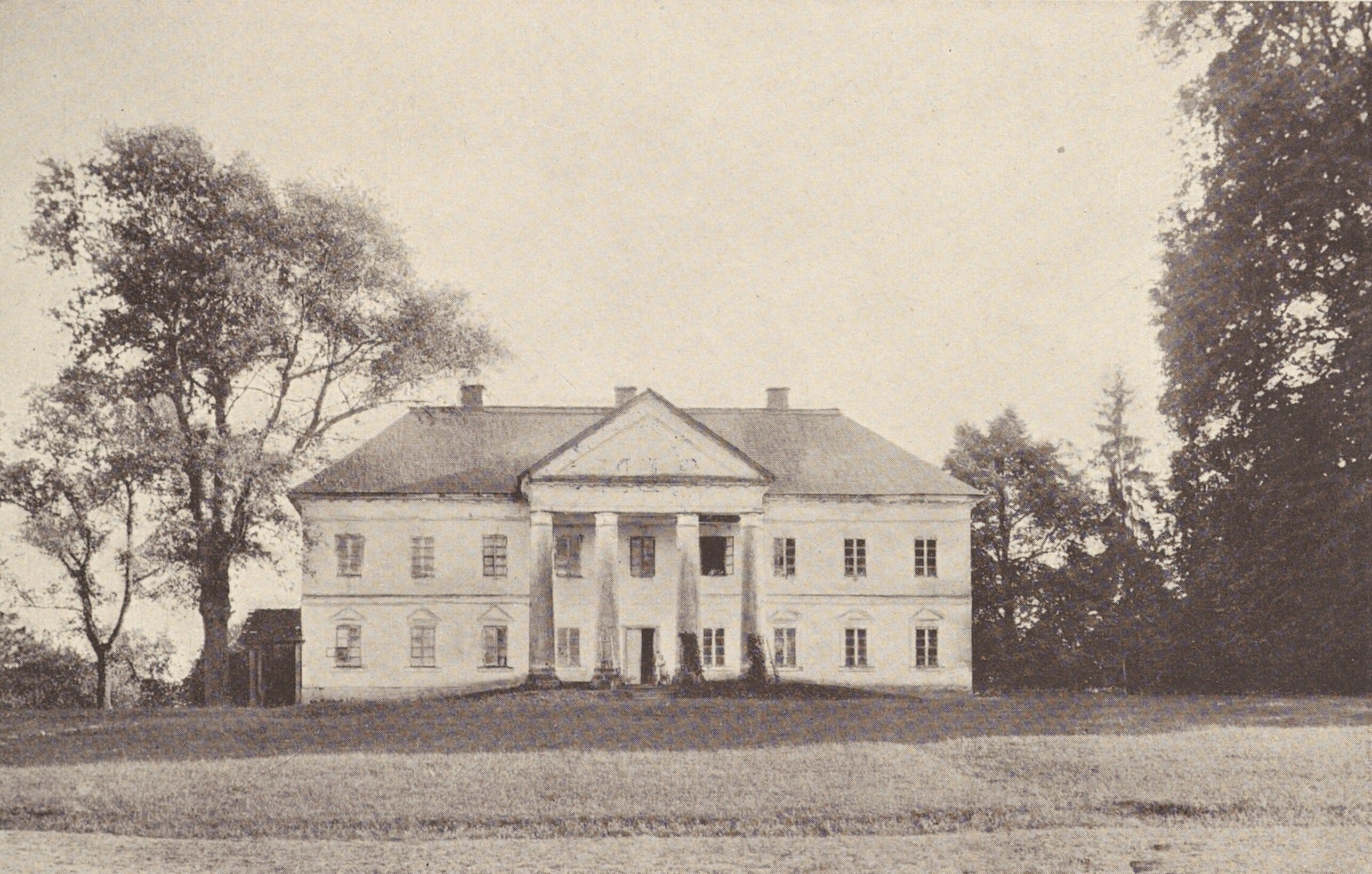
Palace before 1911

Volodymyrets was founded under the rule of Kievan Rus' times. In 1943 a sotnia of the Ukrainian Insurgent Army organized resistance to Nazi Germany in the area.

In 1957 Volodymyrets acquired the status of an urban-type settlement. On 26 January 2024, a new law entered into force which abolished this status, and Volodymyrets became a rural settlement.

== Notable people ==
- Max Kidruk — Ukrainian writer.
- Lesia Tsurenko — Ukrainian tennis player.

== See also ==
- Rafalivka, the other urban-type settlement in Volodymyrets Raion of Rivne Oblast
