= Zhorstoke nebo =

2014 novel by Max Kidruk

- Author: Max Kidruk
- Original title: Жорстоке небо (Zhorstoke nebo)
- Genre: techno-thriller
- Publisher: Family Leisure Club
- Publication date: 2014
- Publication place: Ukraine
- Pages: 608
- ISBN: 966-14-7843-0

Zhorstoke nebo (Ukrainian: Жорстоке небо, English: Cruel Sky) is the second techno-thriller and ninth novel by Ukrainian author Max Kidruk. It was published in August 2014.

== Plot ==
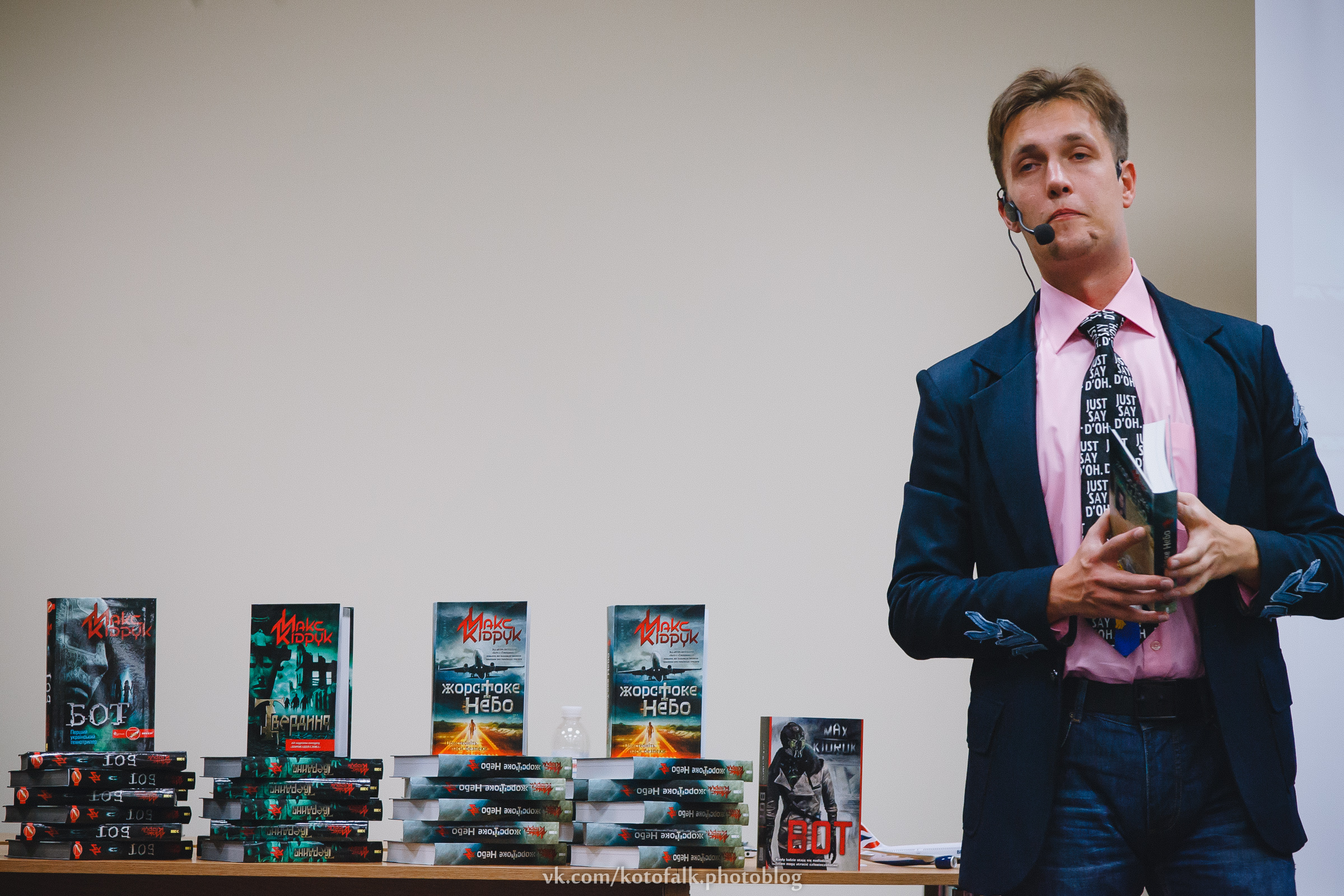
Kidruk at a reading of Zhorstoke nebo at Lviv Airport, October 2014

A French airline France Continental concludes a contract with a Ukrainian aircraft building company Aronov, according to which the latter has to supply a consignment of regional jet airliners to the European Union. The day after the first two planes are brought into operation, one crashes while landing in Paris, killing 49 people. The preliminary investigation states that the accident was caused by a 20-ton snowplow on the same runway where the plane was to land. A 28-year-old Ukrainian woman Diana Stoliar, whose father led the plane’s design development group but died after a heart attack a year ago, joins the international investigation team. Diana quickly discovers that the reasons for the crash are not that simple and is confronted with a dilemma: to protect her father’s good name or to find the truth.

== Work on the novel ==
It took Kidruk one year to prepare the materials and write the novel. During this time, he shared some of the text with his readers so that they could influence the plot and the characters before the final book was published. This is the first novel from Kidruk featuring a female protagonist.

== Vnukovo accident ==
Two months after the book was published, a similar plane crash occurred at Vnukovo International Airport in Moscow. During the acceleration before take-off, a French private jet collided with a snowplough, causing fire and destruction of the plane. All three crew members and the sole passenger, French businessman Christophe de Margerie, were killed.

== See also ==
- List of Ukrainian-language writers
- The Stronghold
- Ukrainian literature
