= Max Kidruk =

Ukrainian travelogue and fiction writer (born 1984)

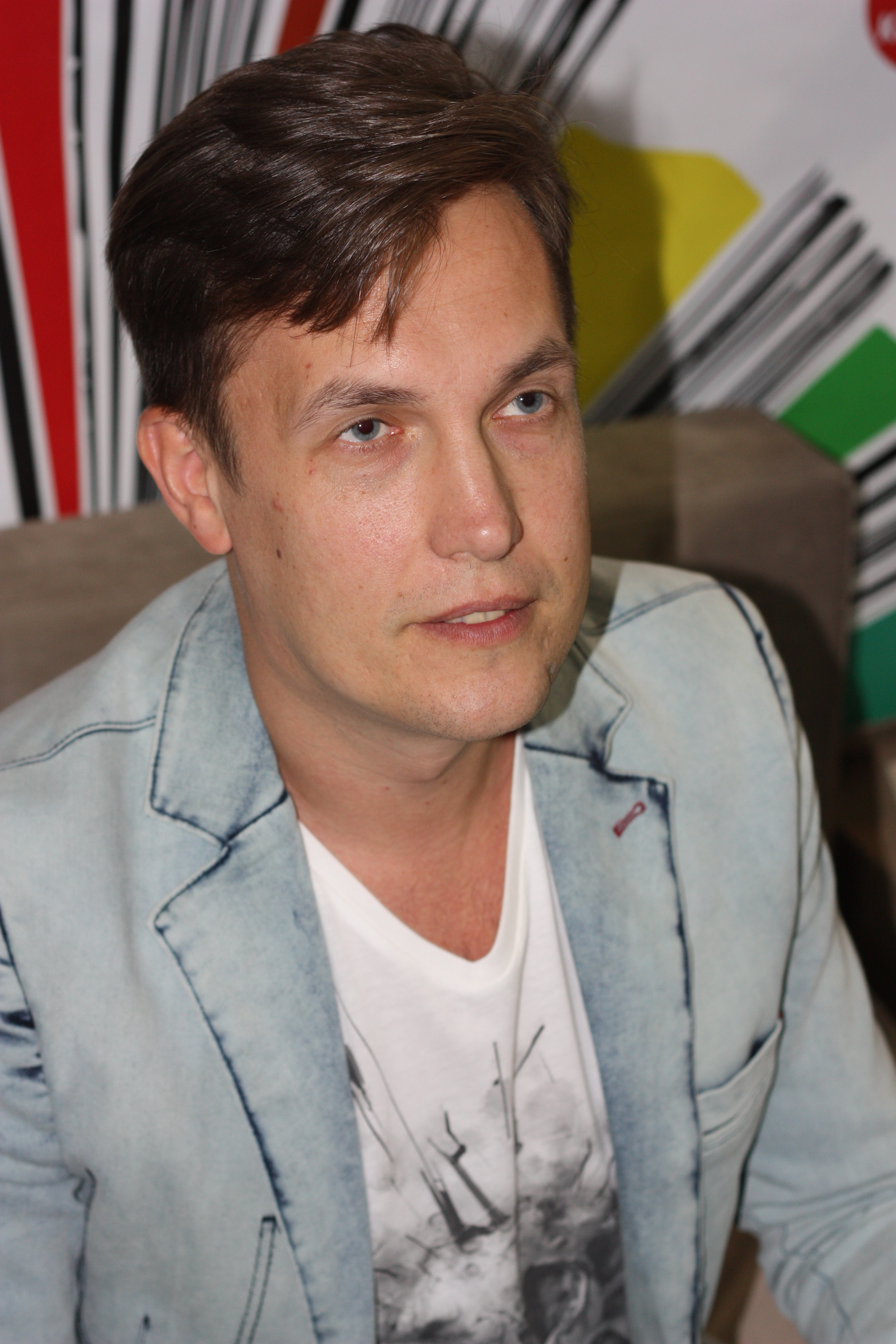
- Kidruk in 2017
- Born: Maksym Ivanovych Kidruk; 1 April 1984 (age 42); Volodymyrets, Ukraine
- Education: Kyiv Polytechnic University
- Occupation: Writer
- Spouse: Tetiana Kidurk
- Writing career
- Period: 2009–present
- Genres: Travel literature, techno-thriller
- Website: darkages.maxkidruk.com/en/

Maksym Ivanovych Kidruk (Ukrainian: Максим Іванович Кідрук) is a Ukrainian travelogue and fiction writer and publisher. In 2009, he published Mexican Chronicles, which is an autobiography describing his journey across Mexico from the Pacific Ocean to the Caribbean Sea. Since then, Kidruk has traveled to 35 countries and written 28 books, including travelogues, adventure stories, and thrillers. Since 2012, he has been writing in the techno-thriller genre.

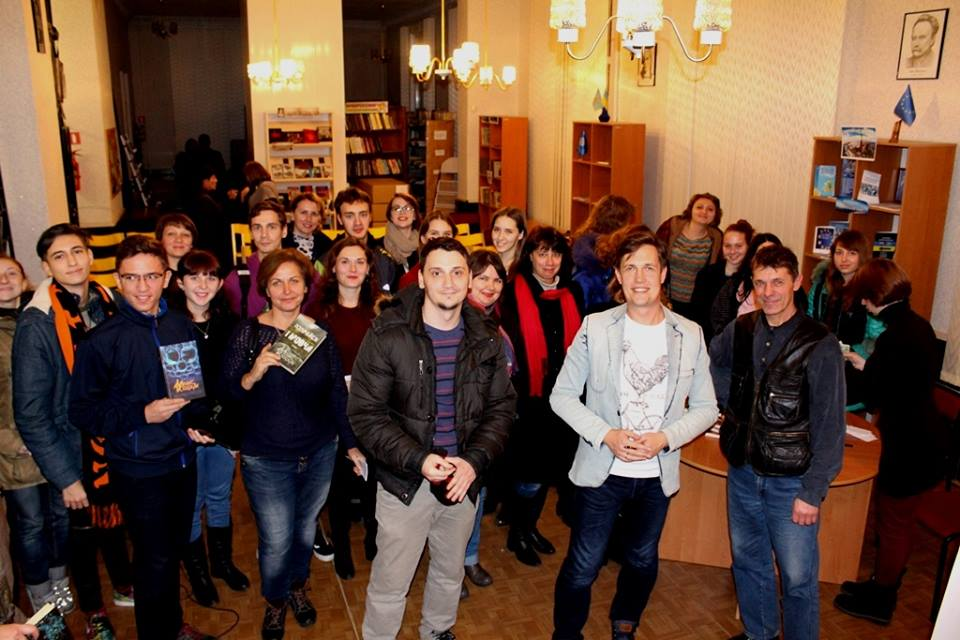

== Life ==
Kidruk was born in Volodymyrets, Ukraine, on 1 April 1984.

In 2006, he graduated from the National University of Water Management and Natural Resources Use in Rivne, Ukraine with a Master of Science in Engineering. During his studies, Kidruk worked as a programmer for ASCON, a Russian software company. After graduating, he moved to Kyiv and became a postgraduate student at the Kyiv Polytechnic Institute.

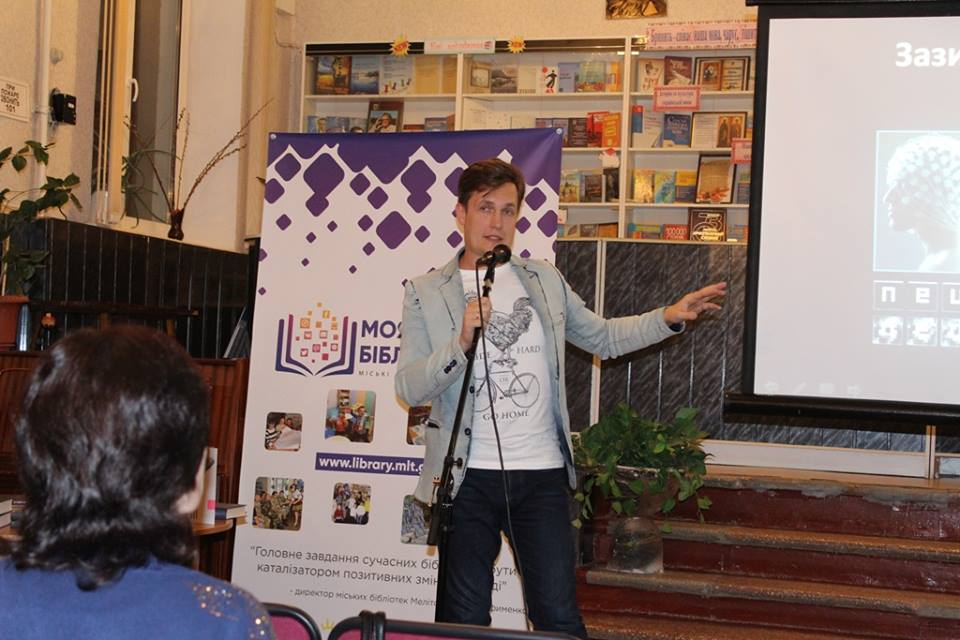

In 2007, Kidruk obtained a scholarship from the Swedish Institute and moved to Stockholm, where he studied Sustainable Development at the Swedish Royal Institute of Technology (Kungliga Tekniska Högskolan — KTH), which was one of the leading technical universities in Europe. For the next two years, Kidruk lived in Europe, where his interests gradually shifted from science to literature.

In the summer of 2008, Kidruk traveled across Mexico, touring from the Pacific Ocean to the Caribbean Sea. He documented his experience in his debut book, Mexican Chronicles, which became an immediate hit in Ukraine and sold out within six months. By 2009, Kidruk decided to leave both graduate programs to focus on a career in professional writing.

Between 2010 and 2012, Kidruk visited nearly 30 countries, including Chile, Brazil, China, Turkey, Norway, and Syria. In 2010, Kidruk published 'Journey to the Navel of the World', which described his trip to South America and Easter Island. The book was also successful, with a second edition appearing in 2012.

In 2011, he witnessed the Egyptian uprising, staying for two weeks in Tahrir Square surrounded by Arabs protesting against President Mubarak. Later that year, Kidruk organized a response to the "Win a Ukrainian Wife" competition by The Rock FM, a radio station in New Zealand. He later described the incident in an autobiography titled 'To New Zealand!'

The first edition of Bot sold out in three months. Bot is being translated into Russian, Polish, and German. In 2013, Kidruk released 'The Stronghold' another techno-thriller. In 2014, he published 'Ruthless Sky', a thriller.

== Bibliography ==
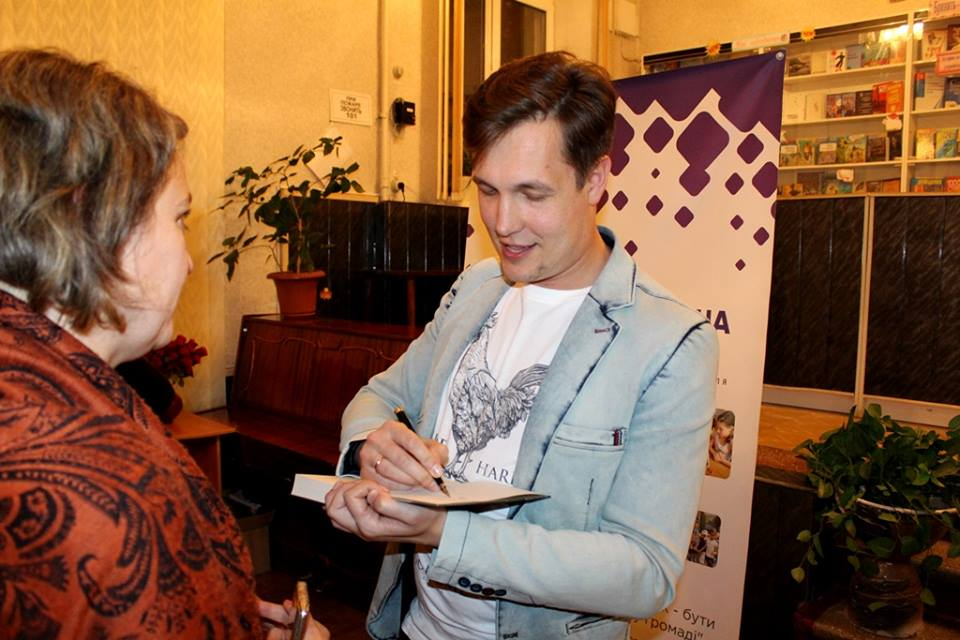

=== Fiction ===
Year	Title	Format	Ref.
2009	Mexican Chronicles	Novel	
2010	The Journey to the Navel of the World. Volume 1	Novel	
2010	The Journey to the Navel of the World. Volume 2	Novel	
2011	Screwballs in Mexico	Collection	
2011	Screwballs in Peru	Collection	
2011	Love and Piranhas	Novel	
2012	Bot. Atacama Crysis	Novel	
2013	Stronghold	Novel	
2014	To New Zealand!	Novel	
2014	Ruthless Sky	Novel	
2015	Bot. Guayaquil Paradox	Novel	
2016	The Inner Side of Dreams	Novel	
2017	Don't Look Back and Stay Silent	Novel	
2018	Godlessness	Novel	
2019	For the Sake of the Future	Novel	
2019	Until the Light Fades Away	Novel	
2023	New Dark Ages: Colony	Novel	

=== Journalism books ===
- 2015 – Unbrotherly (Небратні) — ISBN 978-966-14-8789-4

=== Co-written books ===
- 2011 – 20 Writers of Modern Ukraine
- 2011 – Writers on Football
- 2014 – Ode to Joy
- 2015 – Volunteers. Mobilization of the Good

=== Translated books ===
- 2012 – «Wodka für den Torwart: 11 Fußball-Geschichten aus der Ukraine» (in German)
- 2013 – Bot (in Russian)
- 2014 – «MAJDAN!: Ukraine, Europa» (in collaboration, in German)
- 2014 – Bot (in Polish)
- 2015 – «Ja, Ukrainiec» (in Polish)

=== Technical books ===
- 2008 – ArCon: Interior Design and Architectural Simulation for All (in Russian)
- 2009 – Compass-3D V10 for 100% (in Russian)
- 2009 – Video manual for self-tuition on Compass-3D (DVD) (in Russian)
- 2010 – Work in designing system Compass-3D V11 (in Russian)

== Awards ==
- Second prize in Coronation of the Word-2009.
- "The Book of the Year 2010" from Correspondent.
- "Discovery of the Year" by Book Supermarket.
