= Antonivka rural hromada =

Municipality in Rivne Oblast, Ukraine

Antonivka rural hromada Антонівська сільська громада
- Hromada
- Interactive map of Antonivka rural hromada
- Country: Ukraine
- Oblast (province): Rivne Oblast
- Raion (district): Varash Raion
- Established: 2020
- Administrative center: Antonivka

Area
  - Total: 113 km^{2} (44 sq mi)

Population
  - Total: 5,347
  - Density: 47.3/km^{2} (123/sq mi)

Antonivka rural hromada is one of the hromadas of Varash Raion in Rivne Oblast of Ukraine. Its administrative centre is the village of Antonivka. The Antonivka territorial hromada is located north of Rivne. Community population: 5,347 (as of 01.01.2023).

== Composition ==
The hromada consists of 4 villages:

- Antonivka
- Chakva
- Velyki Tseptsevychi
- Netreba
