= Volodymyrets Raion =

Former subdivision of Rivne Oblast, Ukraine

Volodymyrets Raion Володимирецький район
- Raion
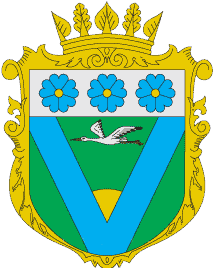
- Flag Coat of arms

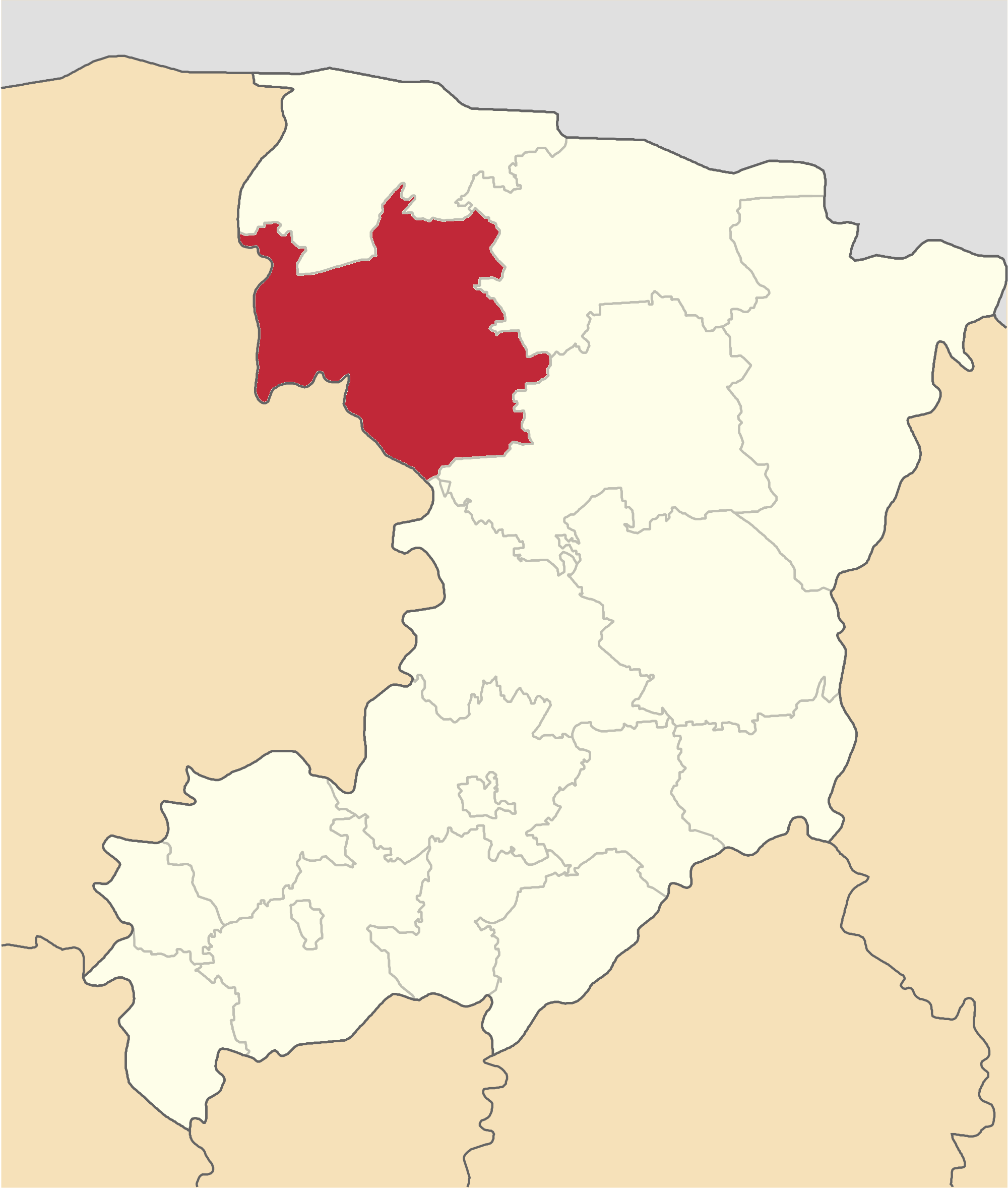
- Coordinates: 51°27′7″N 26°1′35″E
- Country: Ukraine
- Oblast: Rivne Oblast
- Established: 1939
- Disestablished: 18 July 2020
- Admin. center: Volodymyrets
- Subdivisions: List: — city councils; — settlement councils; — rural councils; Number of localities: — cities; — urban-type settlements; 65 — villages; — rural settlements

Area
  - Total: 1,940 km^{2} (750 sq mi)

Population (2020)
  - Total: 65,501
  - Density: 33.8/km^{2} (87.4/sq mi)
- Time zone: UTC+02:00 (EET)
  - Summer (DST): UTC+03:00 (EEST)
- Area code: +380
- Website: Volodymyrets Raion

Volodymyrets Raion (Ukrainian: Володимирецький район) was a raion in Rivne Oblast in western Ukraine. Its administrative center was the urban-type settlement of Volodymyrets. The raion was abolished and its territory was merged into Varash Raion on 18 July 2020 as part of the administrative reform of Ukraine, which reduced the number of raions of Rivne Oblast to four. The last estimate of the raion population was 65,501 (2020 est.) It is within the Eastern European Time Zone (GMT+2)

== See also ==
- Subdivisions of Ukraine
