= Colony (Kidruk novel) =

2022 science fiction novel by Max Kidruk

New Dark Ages: Colony
- Author: Max Kidruk
- Original title: Нові Темні Віки. Колонія
- Language: Ukrainian
- Series: New Dark Ages
- Genre: Science fiction
- Publisher: Bearded Tamarin
- Publication date: December 2022
- ISBN: 978-617-95267-0-1
- Followed by: Collapse

New Dark Ages: Colony is a science fiction novel by Ukrainian writer Max Kidruk. Published in December 2022 by Bearded Tamarin, a publishing house founded by the author and his wife, Tetiana Kidruk, the book is the first part of the New Dark Ages science fiction series, set in the 22nd century. The second part, titled Collapse, is expected around 2026, with the third book to be named And Then Darkness Fell.

A central theme of the novel is that, despite civilizational advancements, human nature remains unchanged, and neither increased longevity nor becoming a two-planet species guarantees humanity's survival.

The book includes numerous illustrations, including color images, tables, and maps, enhancing reader understanding. Within three months of publication, 30,000 copies were sold.

== Plot ==
Set in 2141, the novel depicts Earth recovering from "clodis" (clostridium disease), a disease that caused the largest pandemic in half a century. A new threat emerges—a pathogen infecting only pregnant women. Scientists investigate its nature and possible links to neutrino bursts detected around the planet. Meanwhile, Martian colonies, with a population exceeding 100,000, face resource scarcity, forcing colonists to work harder than Earth’s inhabitants. Martians seek change, unaware that these changes threaten the colonies’ existence.

== Promotion ==
To promote the book, the author embarked on a charitable tour across cities in Ukraine and Europe.

== Reception ==
The novel received positive reviews. Critics praised its scientific accuracy, realistic scenarios of humanity’s demise (such as methane release from hydrates and antibiotic resistance), and extensive illustrations. They also highlighted the complexity and relevance of the issues raised.

Colony is described as a classic cautionary tale, avoiding simplistic notions of good and evil, presenting a morally gray world and people.

The book has been hailed as a new star in Ukrainian science fiction, launching an epic series of modern, hard, and highly scientific fiction.

According to the Ukrainian Book Institute, the novel was a bestseller in 2022.

== Translations ==
- On June 20, 2024, Max Kidruk announced on his Facebook page that Colony will be published in Polish in 2025 by Insignis with an initial print run of 7,000 copies.
- On September 20, 2024, Kidruk posted on Facebook that Colony is being translated into Hungarian, with publication expected in summer 2025 by Európa Könyvkiadó.

== Interesting facts ==
Max Kidruk on his novel:

In this book, I depicted one of the worst scenarios for the future. And, of course, you won’t like it. But I deliberately start this conversation so that the fictional picture does not become reality.

The author stated that in the coming years, he plans to focus solely on writing continuations of the New Dark Ages series.

The novel contains profanity. It has an age restriction of 18+.
