= Varash urban hromada =

Urban hromada in Rivne Oblast, Ukraine

Varash urban hromada Вараська міська громада
- Hromada
- Seal

- Location within Rivne Oblast Location within Ukraine
- Coordinates: 51°20′40″N 25°51′03″E
- Country: Ukraine
- Oblast (province): Rivne Oblast
- Raion (district): Rivne Raion

Area
  - Total: 608.7 km^{2} (235.0 sq mi)

Population (2022)
  - Total: 52,498

Varash urban territorial hromada (Ukrainian: Вараська міська територіальна громада, romanized: Varaska miska terytorialna hromada) is a hromada located in Ukraine's western Rivne Oblast. The administrative centre of the hromada is the city of Varash. As of 2023, the hromada has a population of 52,498 (2022 estimate), and it additionally has an area of 608.7 square kilometres (235.0 mi^{2}).

The hromada was previously an amalgamated hromada.

== Settlements ==
In addition to the capital city of Varash, there are 17 settlements in the hromada, of which all are villages:

- Bilska Volia
- Berezyna
- Kruhle
- Rudka
- Zabolottia
- Mulchytsi
- Zhuravlyne
- Krymne
- Urichchia
- Ozertsi
- Horodok
- Sobishchytsi
- Sopachiv
- Dibrova
- Shchokiv
- Stara Rafalivka
- Babka

== History ==
On 15 January 2023, the Varash urban hromada was one of nine hromadas in Rivne Oblast to receive a bus and humanitarian aid from German bus company Meso and More. According to Vitaliy Koval, Governor of Rivne Oblast, the bus was given to local educational institutions for transportation of students and teachers.

== See also ==
- List of hromadas of Ukraine
