= Varash =

City in Rivne Oblast, Ukraine

Varash Вараш
- City
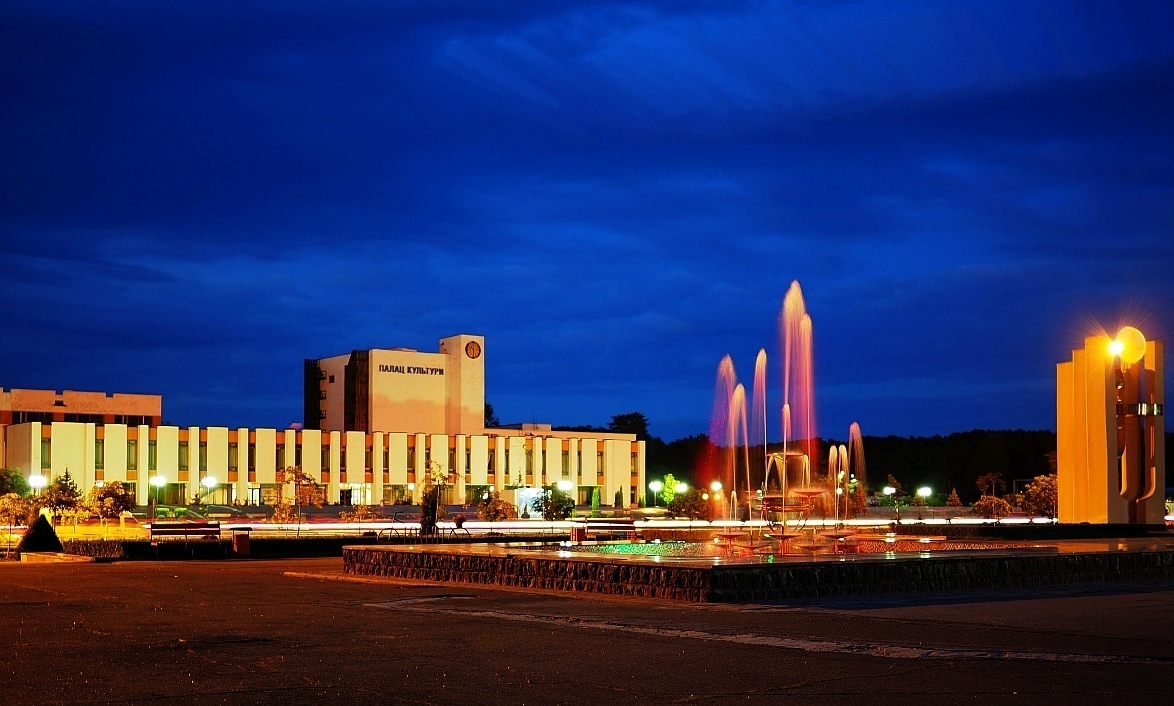

- Flag Coat of arms
- Interactive map of Varash
- Location within Rivne Oblast Location within Ukraine
- Coordinates: 51°20′40″N 25°51′03″E
- Country: Ukraine
- Oblast: Rivne Oblast
- Raion: Varash Raion
- Hromada: Varash urban hromada
- Founded: 1577

Government
  - Mayor: Oleksandr Menzul

Area
  - Total: 11.3 km^{2} (4.4 sq mi)

Population (2022)
  - Total: 41,711
  - Density: 3,690/km^{2} (9,560/sq mi)
- Time zone: UTC+2 (EET)
  - Summer (DST): UTC+3 (EEST)
- Area code: +380 3636

Varash (Ukrainian: Вараш, IPA: [wɐˈrɑʃ]), previously known as Kuznetsovsk (Кузнецовськ) from 1977 to 2016, is a city in Rivne Oblast, Ukraine. It hosts the administration of Varash urban hromada, one of the hromadas of Ukraine and Varash Raion, one of the raions of Ukraine. Population: 41,711 (2022 estimate).

The mayor of Varash is Oleksandr Menzul.

== History ==
The first written mention of Varash is dated back to 1577. The status of an urban-type settlement was established in 1973 as a company town of the Rivne Nuclear Power Plant. The new town was named in honor of the Soviet intelligence agent and partisan Nikolai Kuznetsov. The plan of the city reflects the ideals of late socialist realism. Part of the city occupies the site of the former village of Varash, founded in 1776. Now it is one of the districts in the city.

On 19 May 2016, Verkhovna Rada adopted a decision to rename Kuznetsovsk to Varash and conform to the law prohibiting names of Communist origin.

== Geography ==
Varash is located in the Volhynian Polissia in the north of Rivne Oblast. It is located over the Styr River which is a tributary of Pripyat River between Varash Raion (Rivne Oblast) and Kamin-Kashyrskyi Raion (Volyn Oblast).

== Education ==
There are 12 kindergartens, 6 secondary schools, a high school, a music school, college, and a branch of the Kyiv Institute of Management in the city.

== Press ==
Three newspapers are published in Varash. In addition, a television station and a radio company are operated here.

== Architecture ==
As Varash is a relatively young city, it has a typical building style from the Soviet period. Today, the city continues to grow and expand.

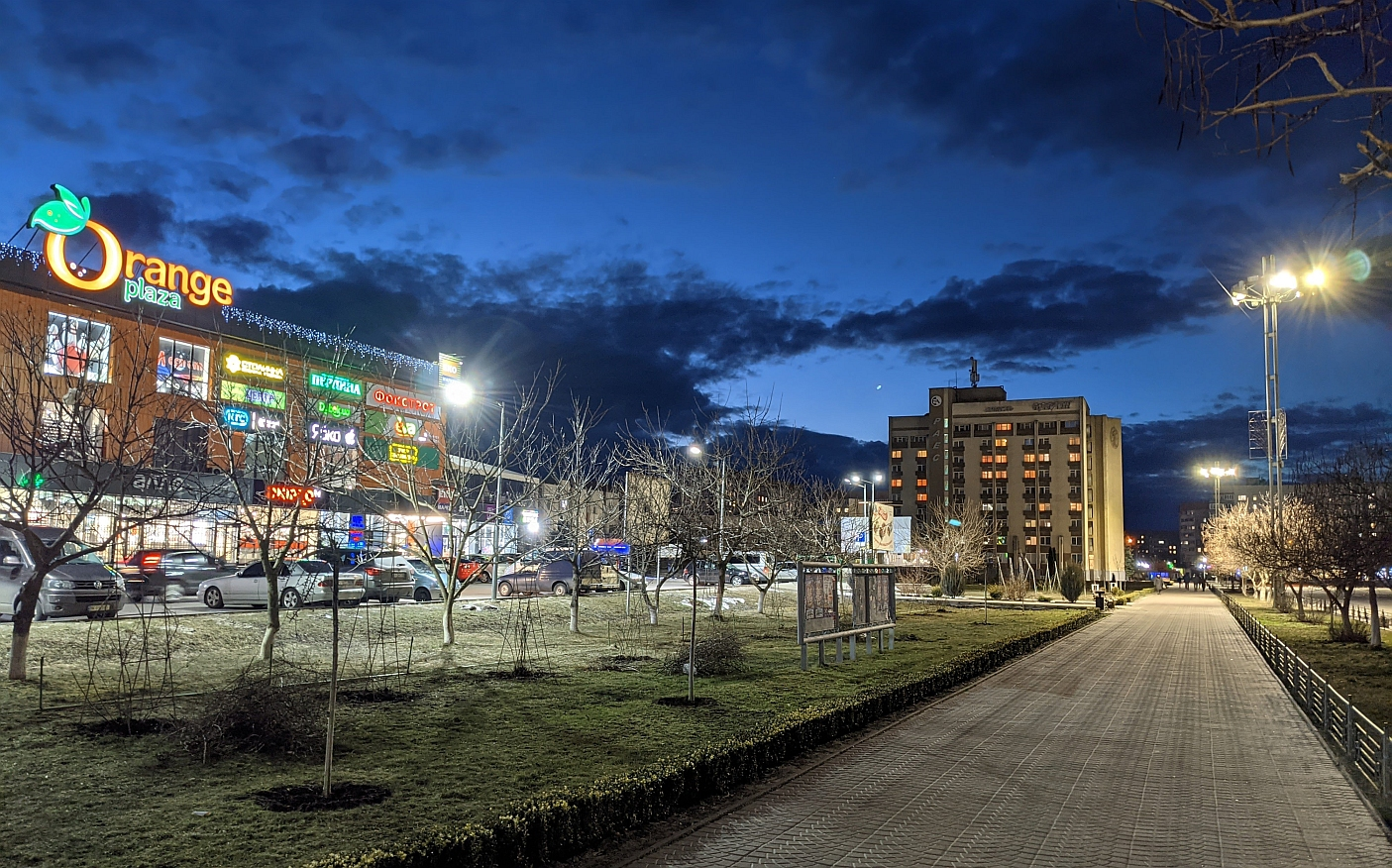
Independence Square

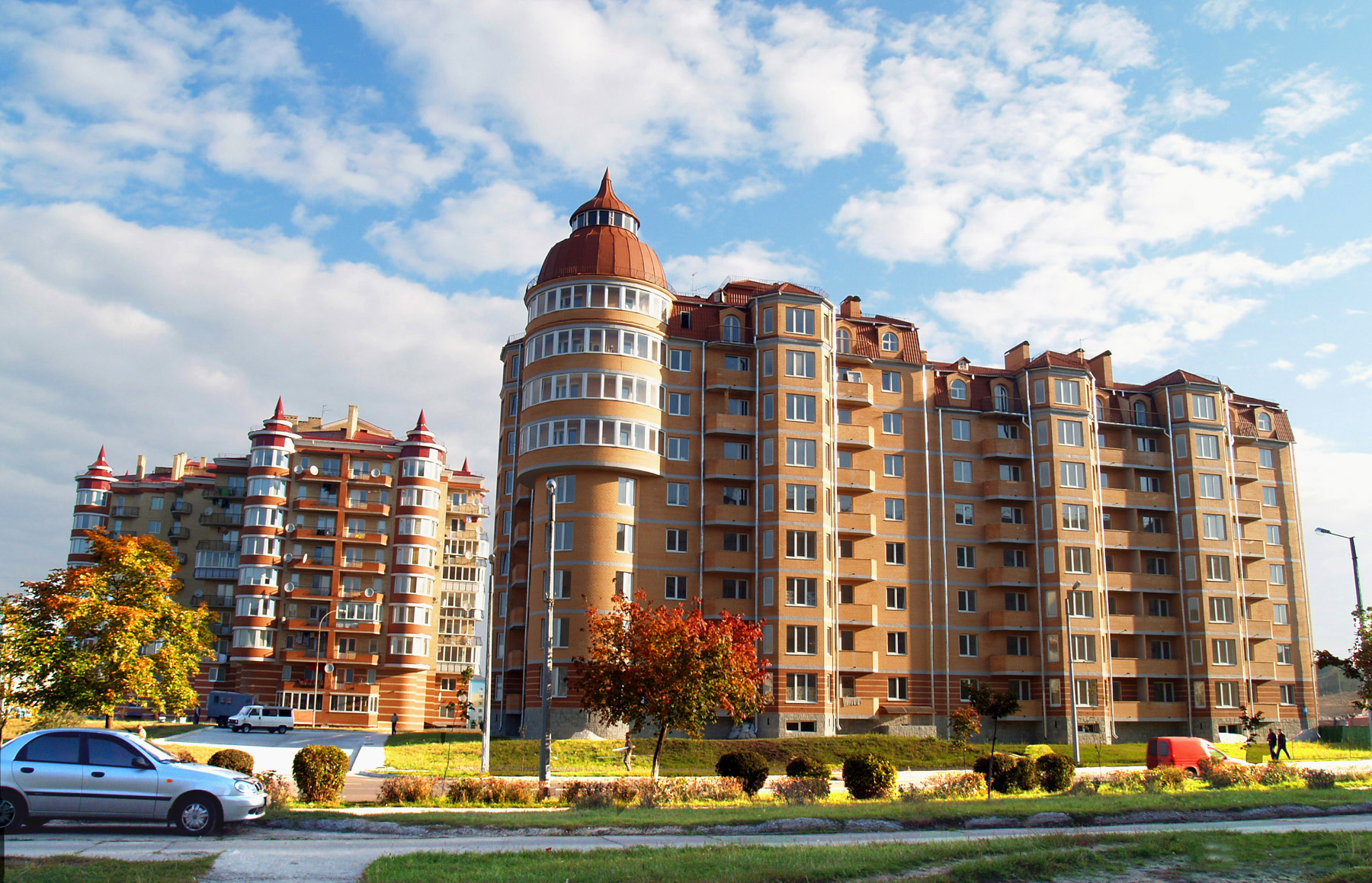
A residential building

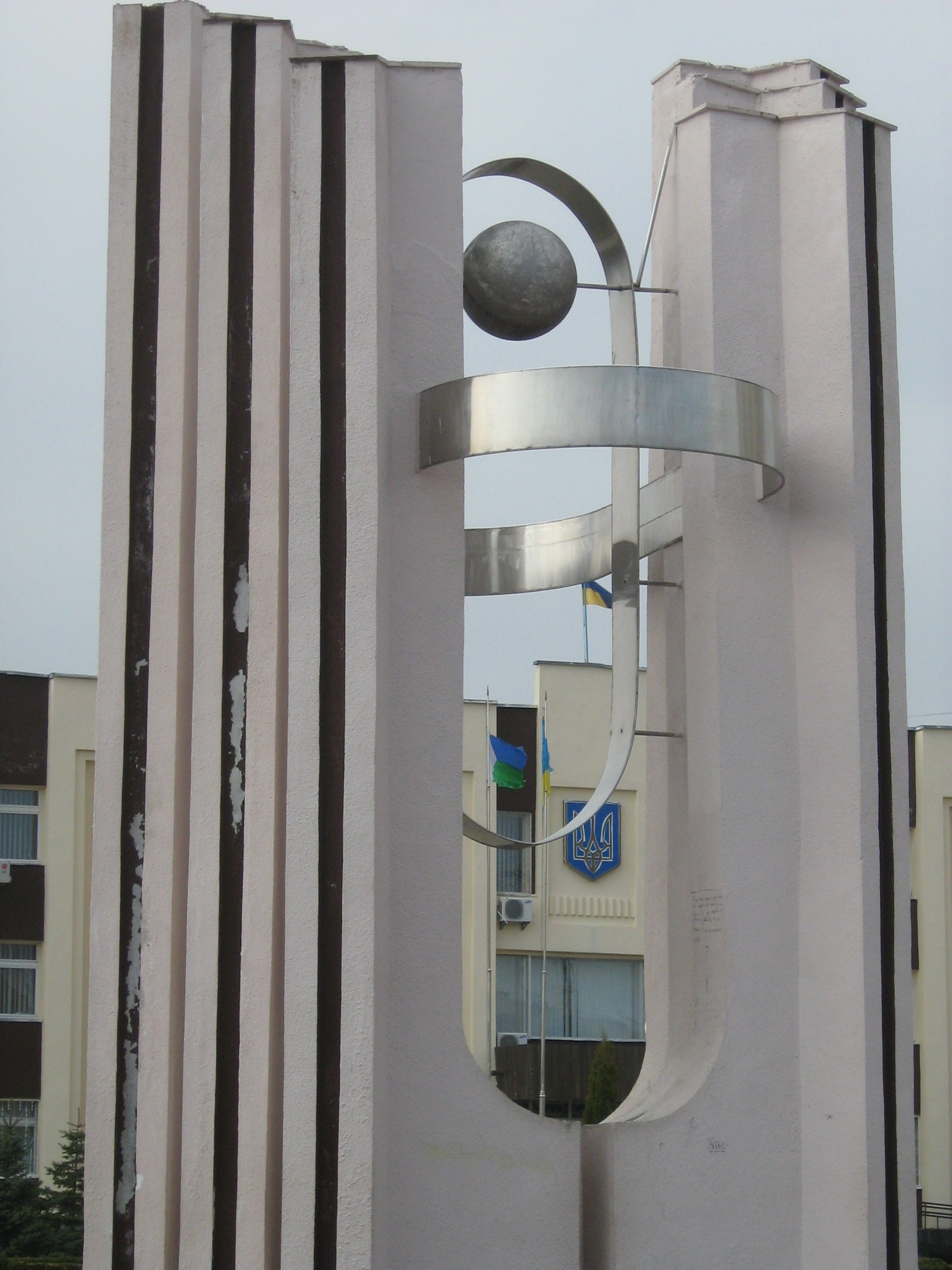

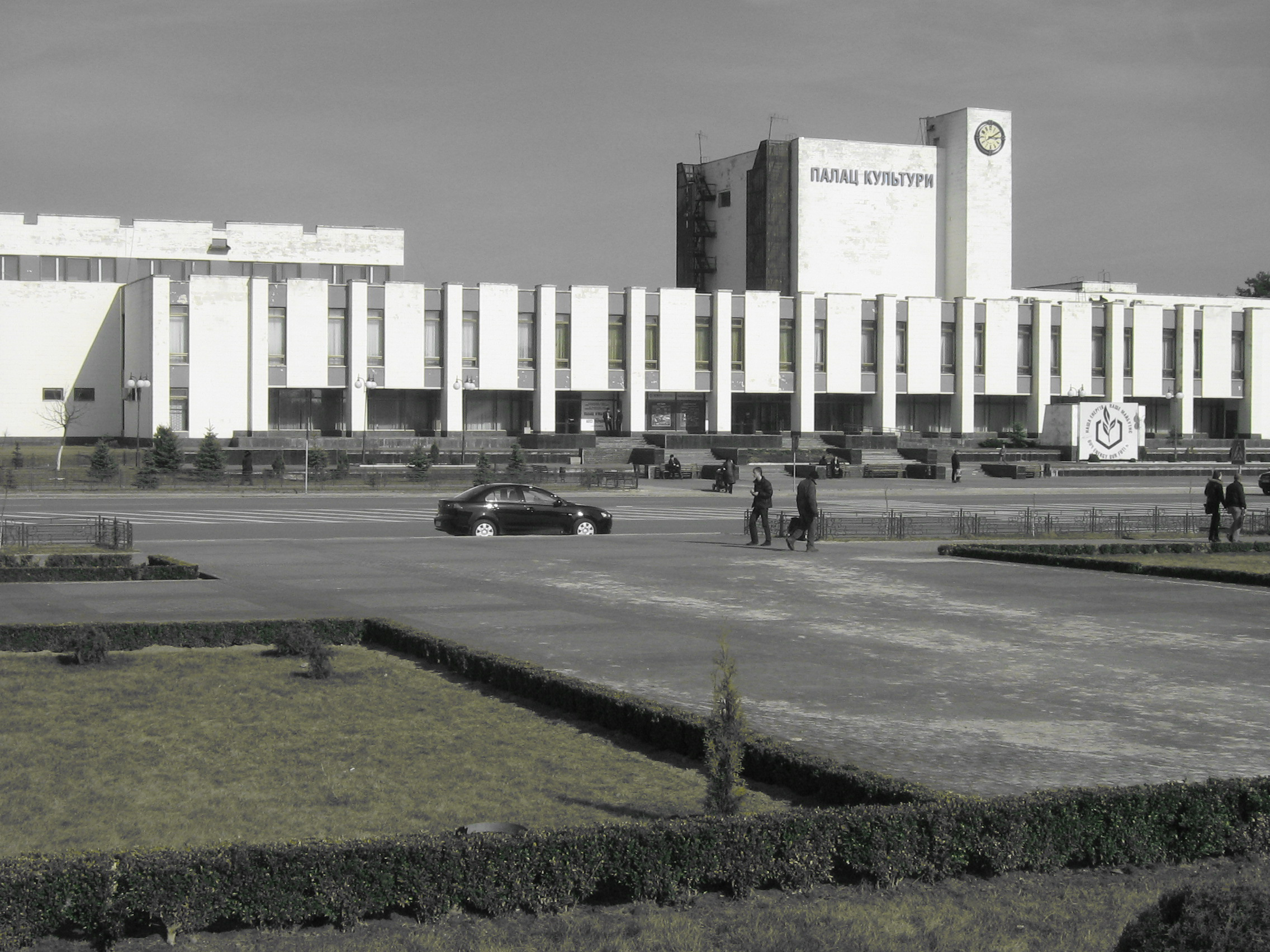
Palace of Culture

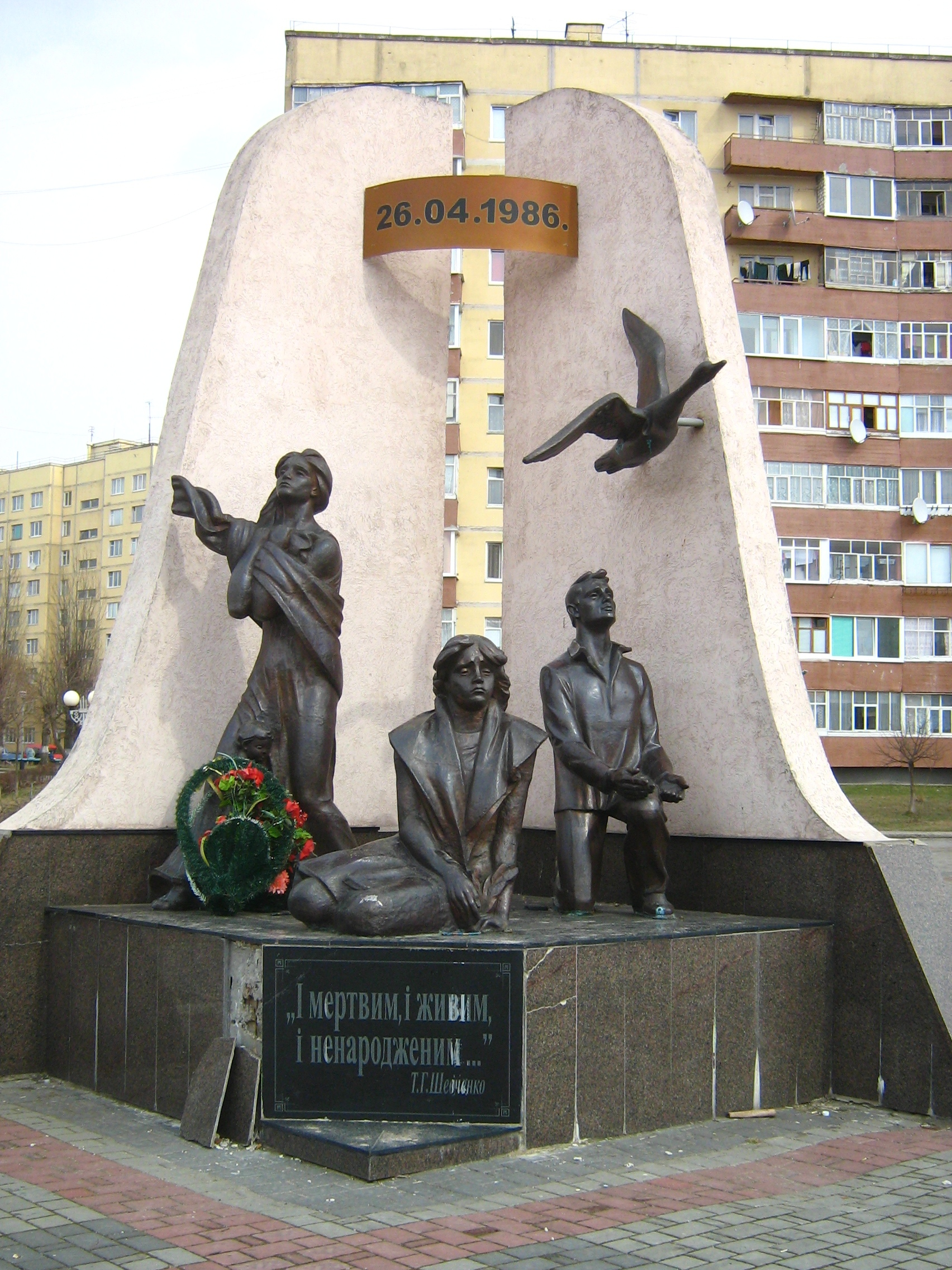
Monument to people affected by the Chernobyl disaster

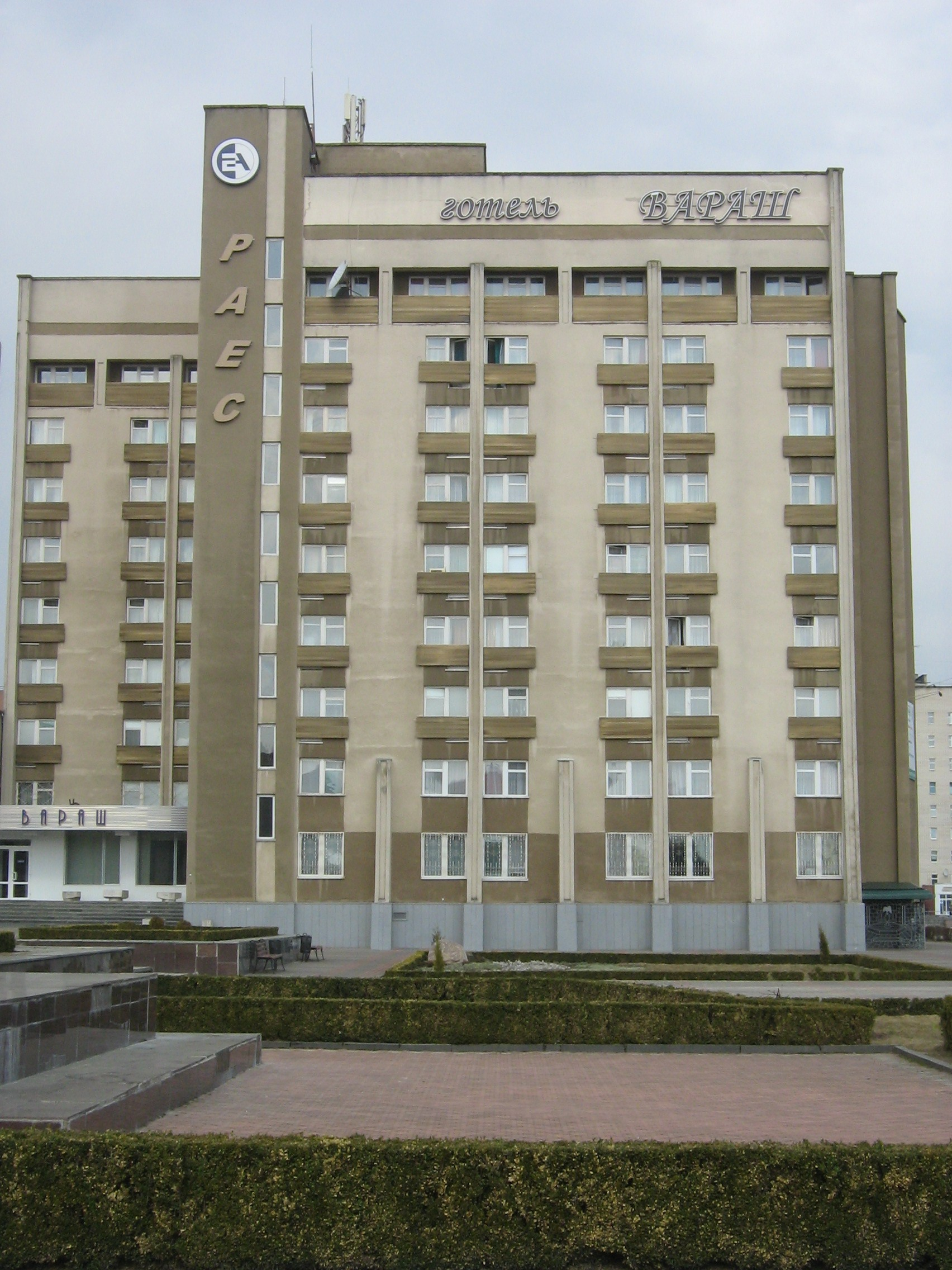
Hotel "Varash"

== Religion ==
There are a few churches and a cathedral. The architectural symbol of the city is the Savior-Transfiguration (Sviato-Preobrazhenskyi) Cathedral.

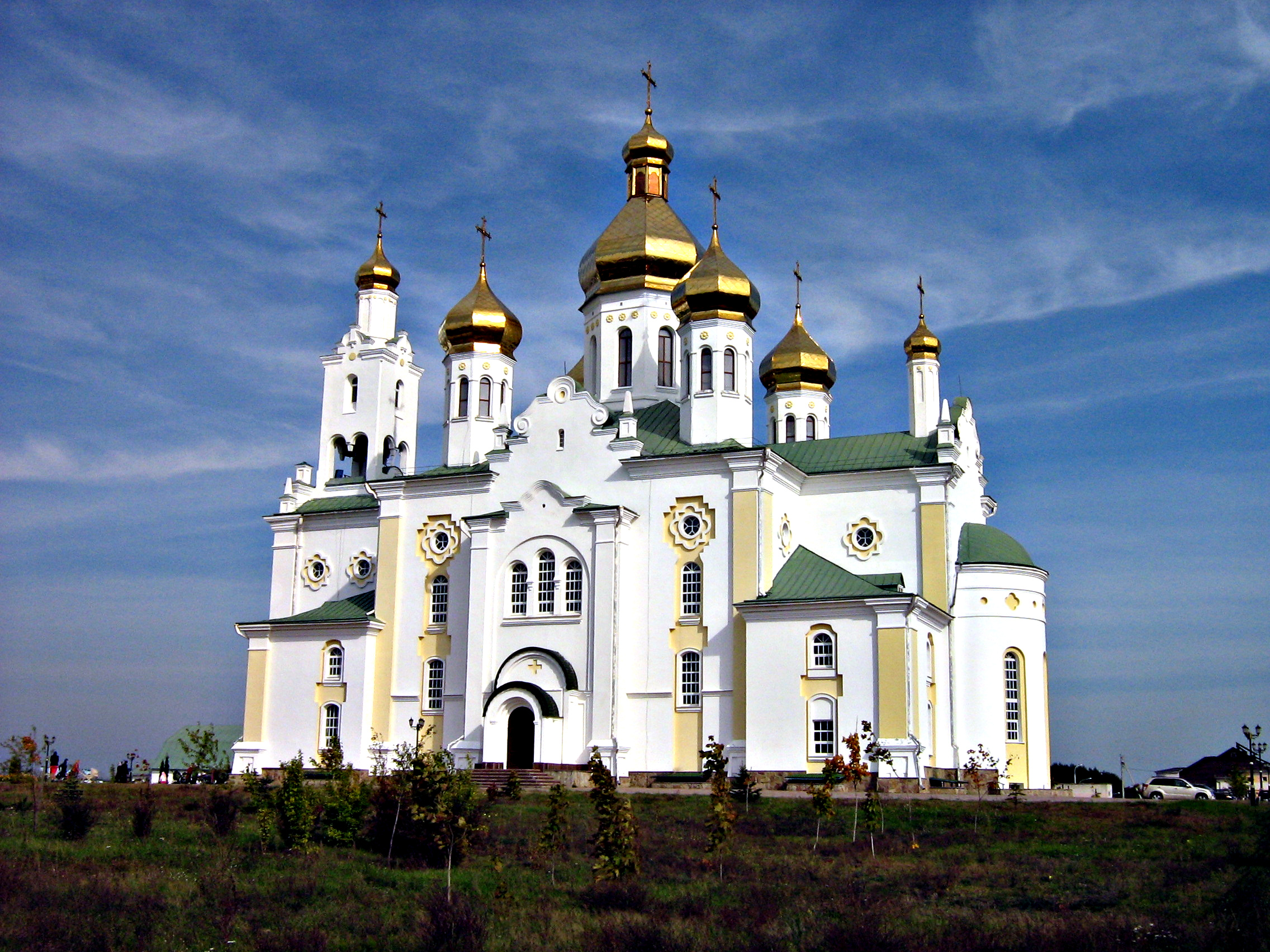
Savior-Transfiguration Cathedral

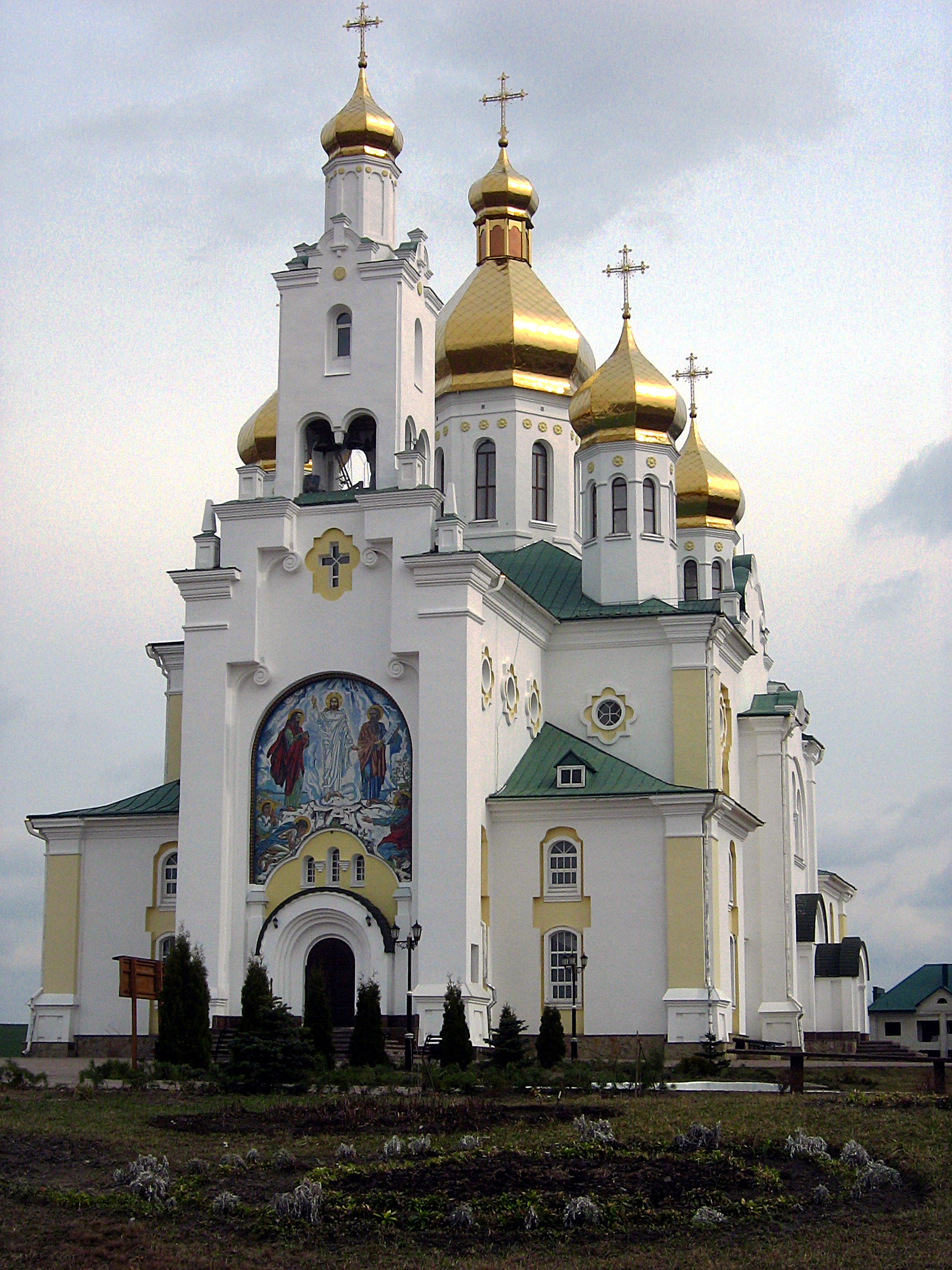

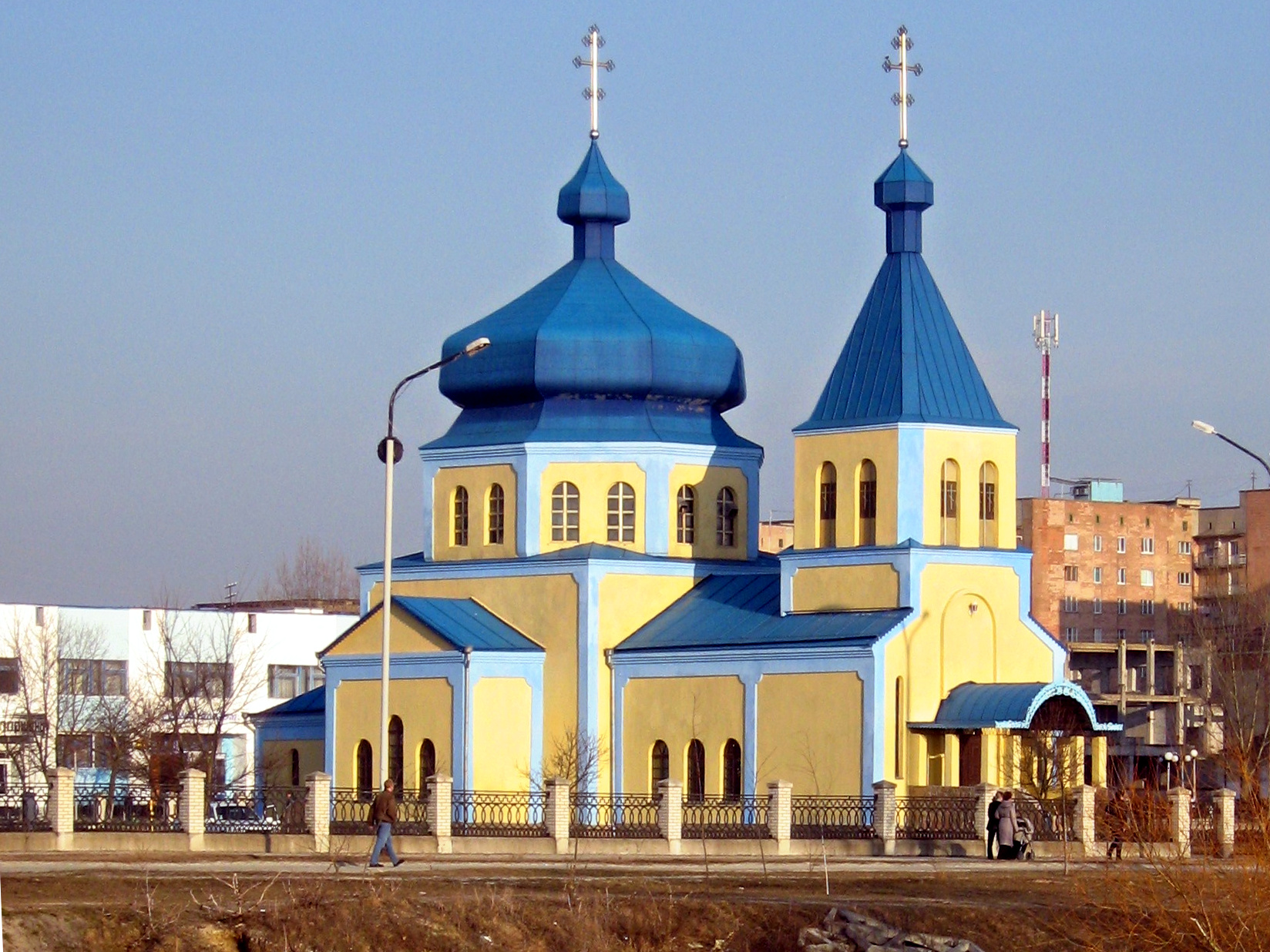
