= Rivne Nuclear Power Plant =

Nuclear power plant in Ukraine

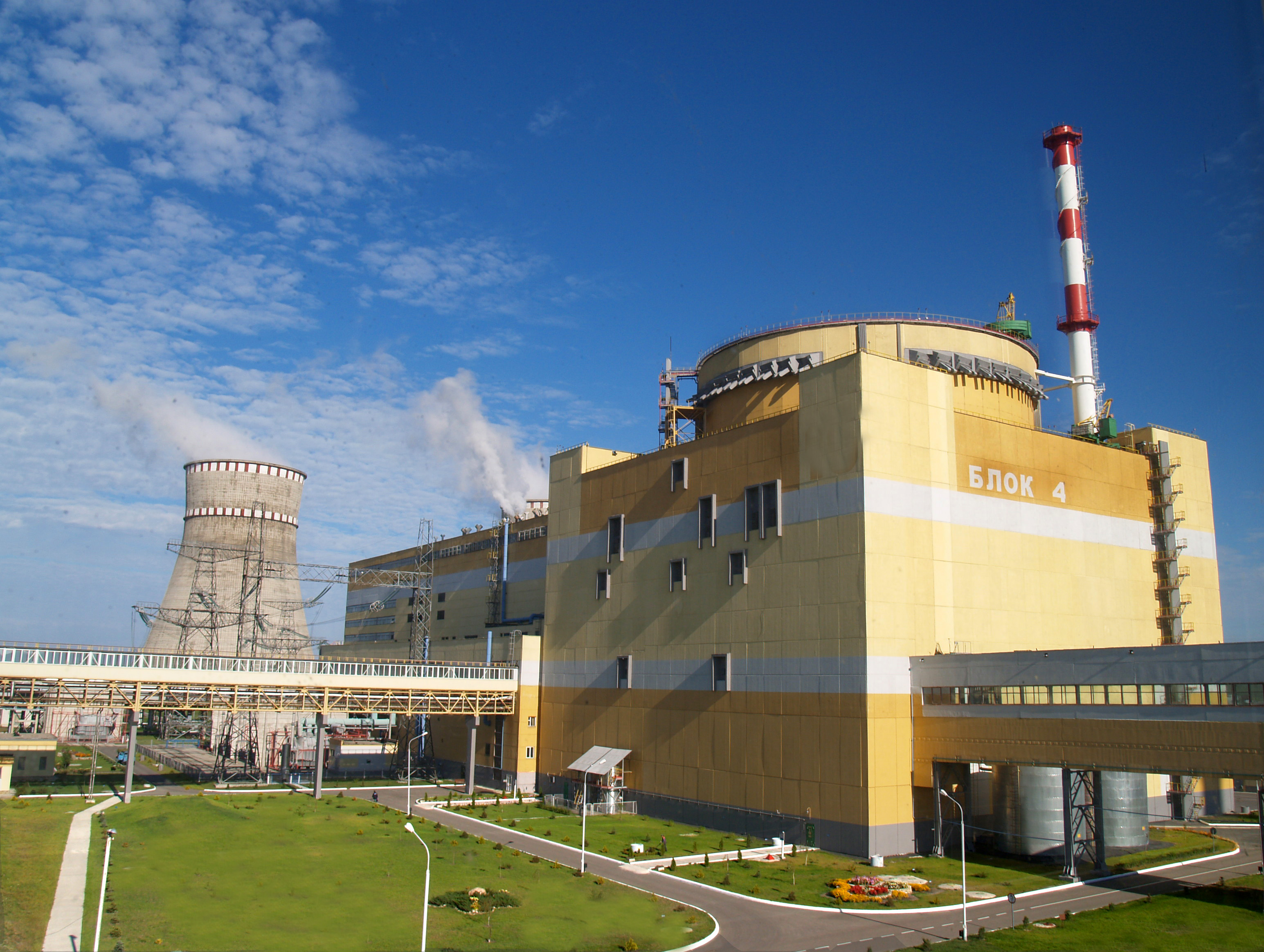
- Official name: Рівненська АЕС
- Country: Ukraine
- Location: Varash, Rivne Oblast
- Coordinates: 51°19′40″N 25°53′30″E
- Status: Operational
- Construction began: Unit 1: August 1, 1973; Unit 2: October 1, 1973; Unit 3: February 1, 1980; Unit 4: August 1, 1986
- Commission date: Unit 1: September 22, 1981; Unit 2: July 29, 1982; Unit 3: May 16, 1987; Unit 4: April 6, 2006
- Owner: Energoatom
- Operator: Energoatom

Nuclear power station
- Reactor type: PWR
- Reactor supplier: Atomstroyexport
- Cooling towers: 6 × Natural Draft
- Cooling source: Styr River
- Thermal capacity: 2 × 1375 MW_{th} 2 × 3000 MW_{th}

Power generation
- Units operational: 1 × 381 MW; 1 × 376 MW; 2 × 950 MW
- Make and model: VVER-440/213; VVER-1000/320
- Nameplate capacity: 2657 MW
- Capacity factor: 69.34%
- Annual net output: 16,139 GW·h (2016)

External links
- Website: http://www.rnpp.rv.ua/
- Commons: Related media on Commons

Rivne Nuclear Power Plant (also called Rovno) is a nuclear plant in Ukraine in Rivne Oblast, which operates the first VVER-440 reactors to be constructed in Ukraine.

The Regulatory Committee of Ukraine, during a meeting in Varash, adopted a decision on extending the lifetime of Rivne power units 1 and 2 by 20 years.

The power station has four reactors with a nameplate capacity of just over 2500 MWe. In 2018 unit 3, after modernization, received a life-extension license extending its operation by 20 years until 2037.

== History ==
The plant dates back to 1971, when the design of the West Ukrainian NPP, which was later renamed Rivne NPP, began.

Construction of the plant began in 1973. The first two power units with VVER-440 reactors were commissioned in 1980–1981, and the 3rd power unit, the millionth unit, was commissioned in 1986.

Since 1991, it has been guarded by the 5th NPP Protection Battalion.

Construction resumed in 1993 after the moratorium was lifted. A survey of Unit 4 was conducted, a program for its modernization was prepared, and a dossier for the construction completion project was prepared. Public hearings on this issue were also held. On October 10, 2004, Rivne NPP Unit 4 was put into operation. The reactor installation of the new Rivne NPP unit belongs to the modern series (VVER-1000).

In recent years, RNPP has been generating about 11–12 billion kWh of electricity, which is 16% of the production at nuclear power plants. On July 2, 2018, it was announced that preparations for the construction of power unit No. 5 were underway.

In early December 2018, a special train was demonstrated on the territory of the Rivne Nuclear Power Plant to transport waste to the repository. The HI-TRAC 190 transshipment container was tested. After loading, the container will be transported from the Rivne NPP to the storage facility in the Chornobyl zone. The container is 3 meters long and weighs 84 tons. The container will be transported from the station to the storage facility on a special railroad platform built specifically for this purpose. It will be protected from accidental collisions by a "softening" car, and the train itself will be under the control of paramilitary guards.

In early February 2019, it became known that the plant's engineers had increased the capacity of Unit 3 by 10 MW.

On December 27, 2019, the radioactive waste treatment plant (RWTP) was launched at the Rivne Nuclear Power Plant.

On the night of December 12, 2020, power unit No. 1 was automatically shut down. According to the announced data, the shutdown occurred as a result of the automatic protection system response due to the shutdown of one of the unit's turbines.

In December 2020, the Technical Center for Automated Remote Metal Inspection was put into operation.

=== The Russian-Ukrainian war ===
During the massive missile attack on Ukraine on November 15, 2022, the NPP lost connection with one of the 750 kV power lines. The plant's power had to be reduced, and one of the four units was automatically shut down.

On July 1, 2023, President of Ukraine Volodymyr Zelenskyy visited the Rivne NPP and held a meeting of the Supreme Commander-in-Chief of the Armed Forces of Ukraine.

On October 30, 2023, according to a report by the Ministry of Energy, the IAEA completed an unannounced inspection at the Rivne Nuclear Power Plant. The inspection was conducted by IAEA inspectors with the participation of an inspector from the State Nuclear Regulatory Inspectorate of Ukraine to verify the absence of undeclared nuclear materials.

Station	Type	Net capacity	Initial criticality	Grid date
Unit 1	VVER-440/213	361 MWe	Dec 1980	Sep 1981
Unit 2	VVER-440/213	384 MWe	Dec 1981	Jul 1982
Unit 3	VVER-1000/320	950 MWe	Nov 1986	May 1987
Unit 4	VVER-1000/320	950 MWe	Sep 2004	Oct 2004
Unit 5 (suspended plan)	VVER-1000/320	950 MWe	N/A	N/A

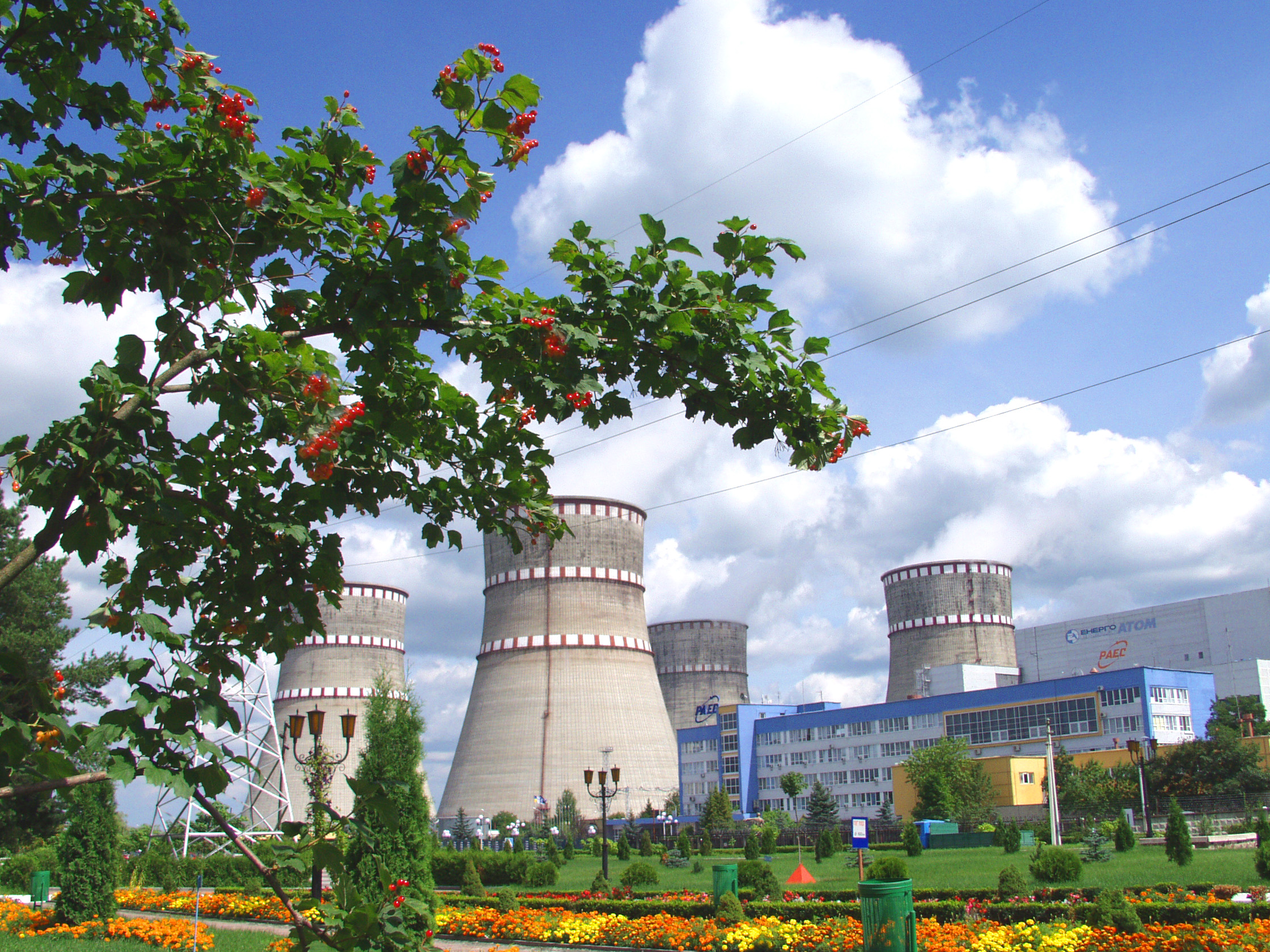

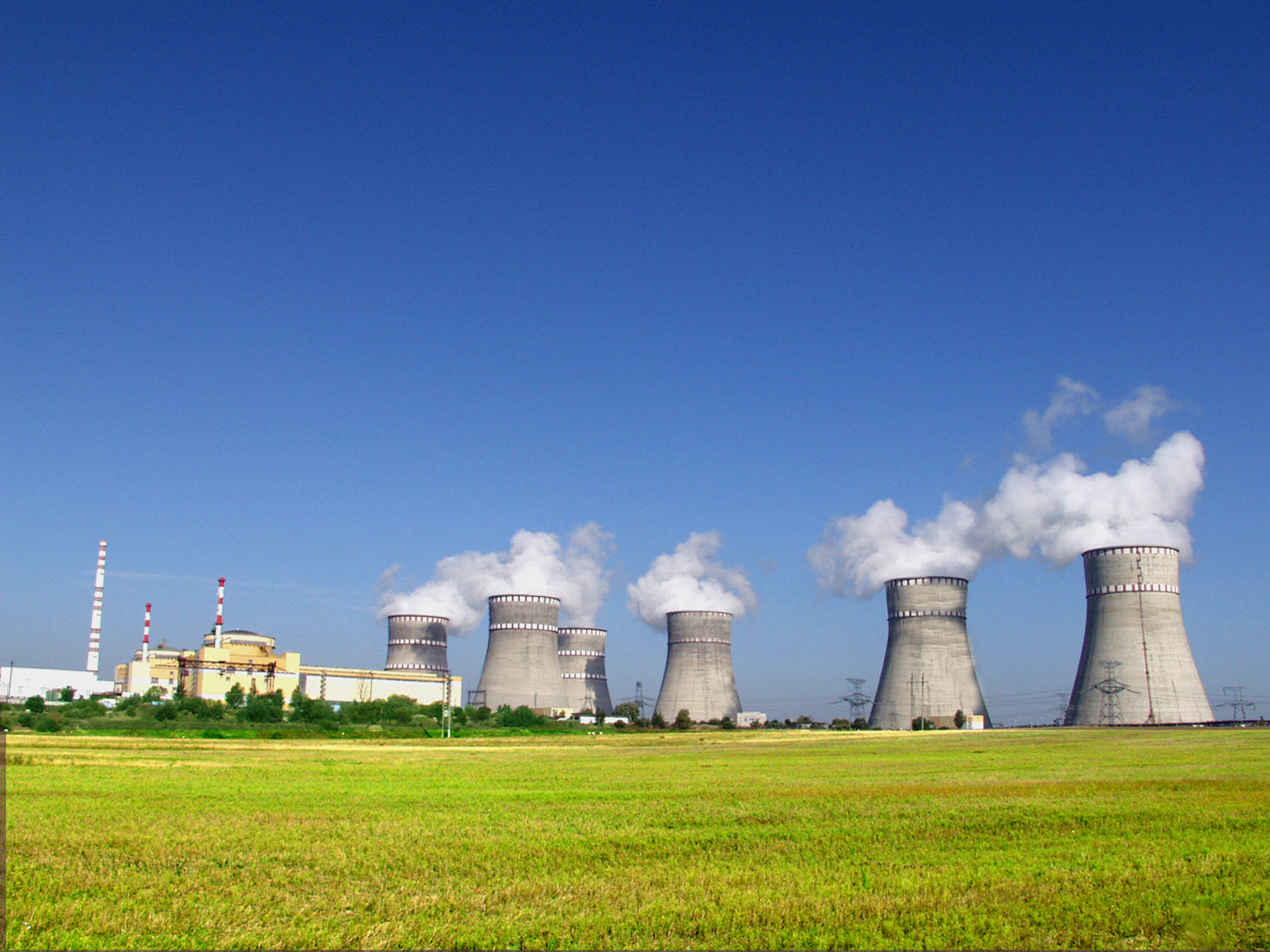

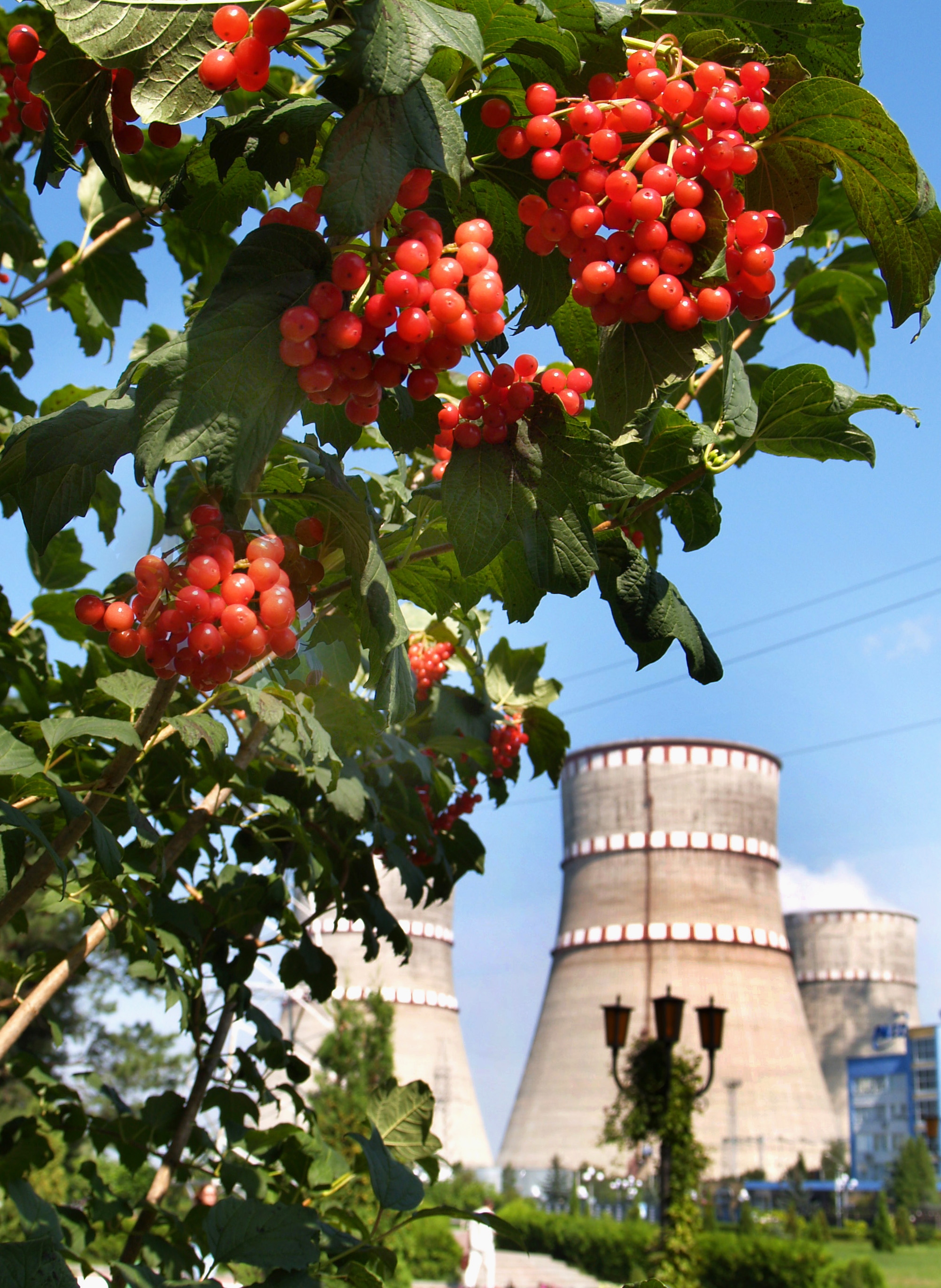

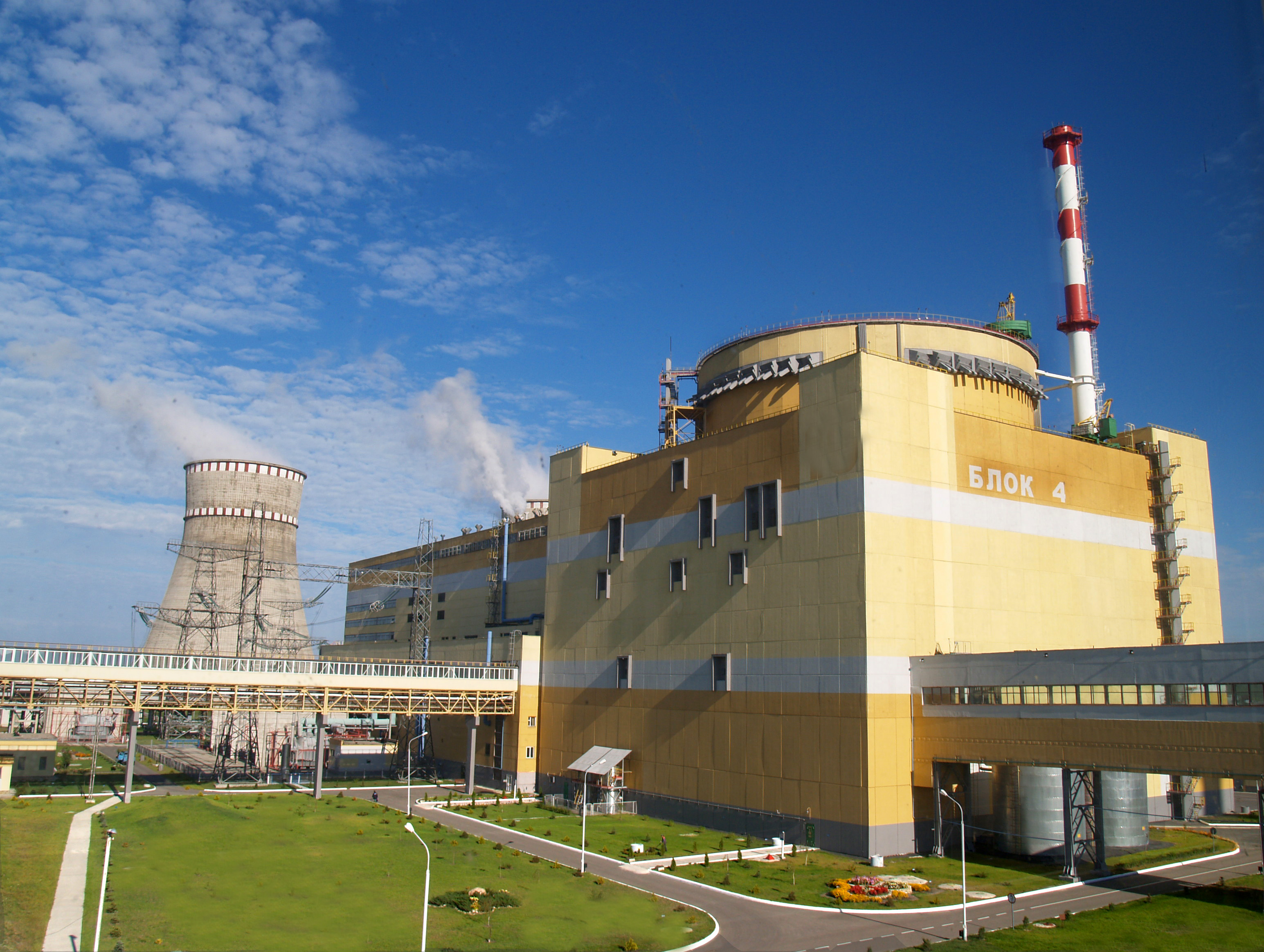

Logo

== See also ==
- Nuclear power in Ukraine
