= Varash Raion =

Subdivision of Rivne Oblast, Ukraine

Varash Raion Вараський район
- Raion
- Country: Ukraine
- Oblast: Rivne Oblast
- Established: 2020
- Admin. center: Varash
- Subdivisions: 8 hromadas

Population (2022)
  - Total: 138,118
- Time zone: UTC+02:00 (EET)
  - Summer (DST): UTC+03:00 (EEST)
- Postal index: N/A

Varash Raion (Ukrainian: Вараський район) is a raion (district) of Rivne Oblast, Ukraine. It was created on 18 July 2020 as part of the reform of administrative divisions of Ukraine. The center of the raion is the city of Varash. Population: 138,118 (2022 estimate).

== Geography ==
The area of the district is 3323.5 km^{2}.

The district borders the Sarny and Rivne districts of the Rivne Oblast, as well as the Volyn region of Ukraine and Belarus.

The relief of the district is flat, partly lowland, covered with pine and oak forests. There are large areas of swamps. Varash Raion has reserves of silt, sapropel, peat, rovno amber.

The larger area of the district is located in the Polesian Lowland in Polesia. Varash Raion is located in the basin of the Pripyat River, which flows in the north of the raion. The right tributary of the Pripyat, the Styr, flows from south to north through the middle of Varash Raion. The climate of the region is moderately continental: winter is mild (in January -4.4 °, -5.1 °), with unstable frosts; summer is warm (in July +18.8 °), not hot. Most often, comfortable weather is observed in the summer months. The formation of stable snow cover is noted in the second decade of December. Rainfall 550 mm per year.

The Nobel National Nature Park and the Rivne Nature Reserve are located on the territory of the district.

== Municipalities of the district ==
Number of settlements 116. Number of cities – 1. The district includes 8 hromadas (municipalities). The district consists of one urban hromada (Varash urban hromada), as well as settlement and rural ones ― Antonivka rural hromada, Volodymyrets settlement hromada, Zarichne settlement hromada, Kanonychi rural hromada, Loknytsia rural hromada, Polytsi rural hromada, Rafalivka settlement hromada.

== Economy ==
Grain and industrial crops are grown in the district, mainly wheat, rapeseed, potatoes, and flax. Timber logging and woodworking, mining (amber mining), food, and light industries are developed. The Rivne Nuclear Power Plant is located in the district, in the city of Varash.

== Transport ==
The national highway of Ukraine pass through Varash Raion М-07, connecting Kyiv to Yahodyn on the border with Poland. This road passes through Mayunichi. Railways through the district run to Kovel and Kyiv.

== Bibliography ==
- Національний атлас України/НАН України, Інститут географії, Державна служба геодезії, картографії та кадастру; голов. ред. Л. Г. Руденко; голова ред. кол.Б.Є. Патон. — К.: ДНВП «Картографія», 2007. — 435 с. — 5 тис.прим. — ISBN 978-966-475-067-4.
- Коротун І.М., Коротун Л.К. Географія Рівненської області. – Рівне, 1996. – 274 с
