= List of villages in Rivne Oblast =

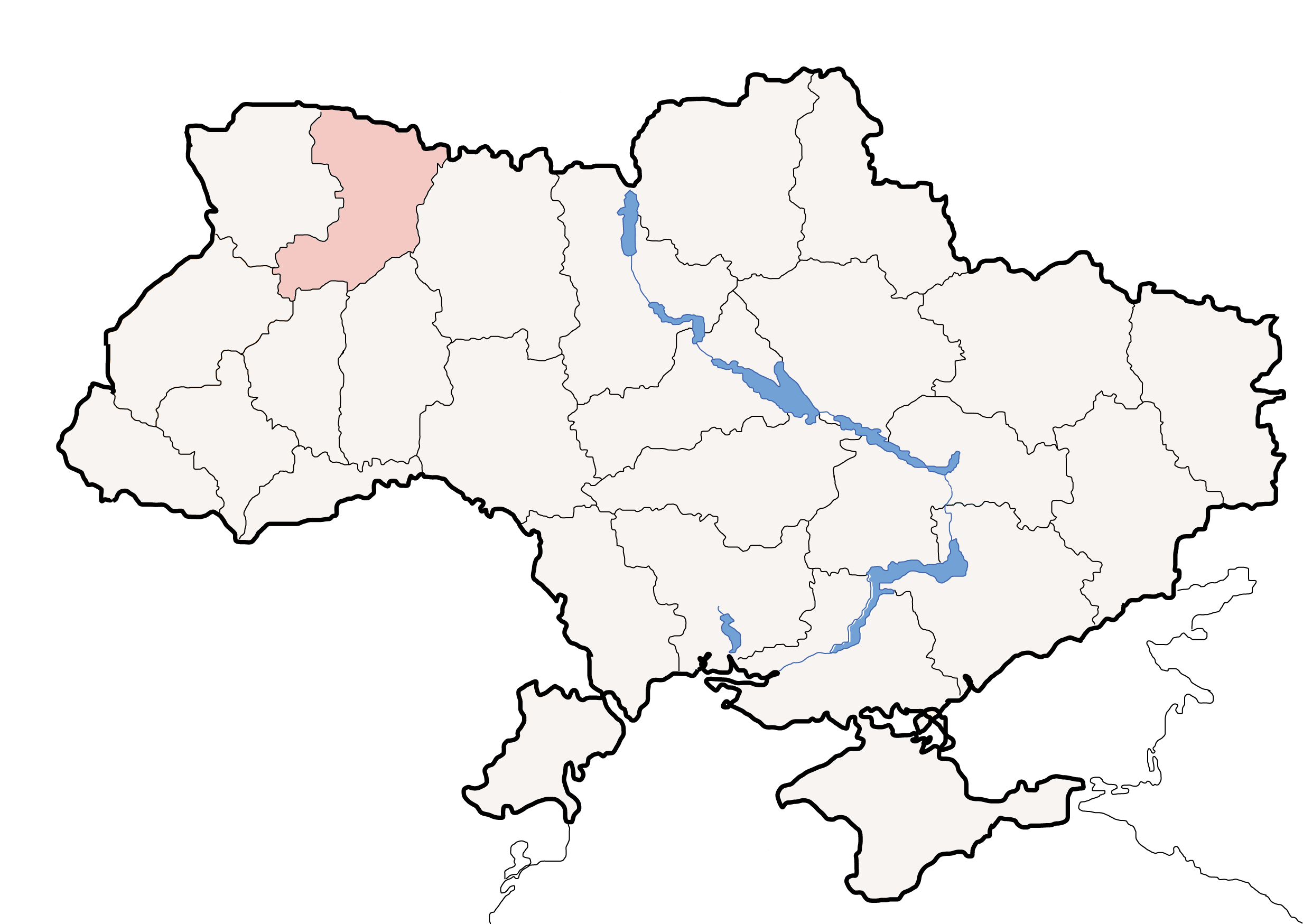
Map of the Rivne Oblast.

The following is a list of villages in Rivne Oblast in Ukraine.

== Berezne Raion (Березнівський район) ==
- Adamivka
- Antonivka
- Balashivka
- Bystrychi
- Bilka
- Bilchaky
- Bohushi
- Bronne
- Vedmedivka
- Velyka Kuplia
- Velyke Pole, Ukraine
- Velyki Selyshcha
- Villia
- Vilkhivka
- Vitkovychi
- Hlybochok
- Holubne
- Horodyshche
- Hrushivka
- Hrushivska Huta
- Hubkiv
- Drukhiv
- Zamostyshche
- Zirne
- Ivanivka
- Kamianka
- Karachun
- Kniazivka
- Kolodiazne
- Kurhany
- Linchyn
- Malynsk
- Malushka
- Marynyn
- Mykhalyn
- Mokvyn
- Mochulianka
- Novyi Mokvyn
- Ozirtsi
- Orlivka
- Pidhalo
- Poliske
- Poliany
- Prysluch
- Sivky
- Sovpa
- Tyshytsia
- Khmelivka
- Khotyn
- Yablunne
- Yalynivka
- Yarynivka
- Yatskovychi

== Demydivka Raion (Демидівський район) ==
- Berestechko
- Bilche
- Boremel
- Verben
- Vychavky
- Vyshneve
- Vovkovyi
- Dolyna
- Dubliany
- Zolochivka
- Ilpyboky
- Kalynivka
- Kniahynyne
- Kopan
- Lysyn
- Lishnia
- Lopavshe
- Maleve
- Naberezhne
- Nyvy-Zolochivski
- Novyi Tik
- Okhmatkiv
- Pasheva
- Perekali
- Rohizne
- Rudka
- Smykiv
- Tovpyzhyn
- Khrinnyky
- Shybyn

== Dubno Raion (Дубенський район) ==
- Bereh
- Biloberizhzhia
- Bilohorodka
- Birky
- Bondari
- Bortnytsia
- Botsianivka
- Buderazh
- Bushcha
- Varkovychi
- Velyki Zahirtsi
- Velyki Sady
- Verba
- Hirnyky
- Holuby
- Hriadky
- Dytynychi
- Pole
- Dubovytsia
- Dubrivka
- Diadkovychi
- Zhorniv
- Zabirky
- Zaluzhzhia
- Zamchysko
- Zaruddia
- Zbytyn
- Zdovbytsia
- Zelene
- Zelenyi Hai
- Zlynets
- Ivanynychi
- Ivannie
- Kamiana Verba
- Kamianytsia
- Kvitneve
- Klyntsi
- Klipets
- Klishchykha
- Kliuky
- Kniahynyn
- Komarivka
- Kopany
- Kostianets
- Kryvukha
- Kryliv
- Lebedianka
- Lypa
- Lystvyn
- Maidan
- Mali Zahirtsi
- Mali Sady
- Martynivka
- Maiaky
- Mykytychi
- Mylcha
- Mynkivtsi
- Myrohoshcha Druha
- Myrohoshcha Persha
- Mokre
- Molodavo Druhe
- Molodavo Pershe
- Molodavo Tretie
- Molodizhne
- Nahirne
- Nahoriany
- Naraiv
- Mykolaivka
- Nova Nosovytsia
- Ozeriany
- Olybiv
- Onyshkivtsi
- Ostriv
- Pantaliia
- Pereroslia
- Pyriatyn
- Pidluzhzhia
- Ploska
- Povcha
- Pryvilne
- Prydorozhne
- Ptycha
- Rachyn
- Ridkoduby
- Sapanivchyk
- Satyiv
- Semyduby
- Sosnivka
- Sofiivka Druha
- Persha
- Mykolaivka
- Stara Nosovytsia
- Stovpets
- Studianka
- Sudobychi
- Tarakaniv
- Travneve
- Trostianets
- Turkovychi
- Turia
- Chereshnivka
- Shepetyn
- Yasynivka

== Dubrovytsia Raion (Дубровицький район) ==
- Berezhky
- Berezhnytsia
- Berestia
- Bilashi
- Bile
- Brodets
- Budymlia
- Velykyi Cheremel
- Velyki Ozera
- Veliun
- Verbivka
- Vysotsk
- Vilne
- Horodyshche
- Hrani
- Hrytsky
- Zhaden
- Zahreblia
- Zalishany
- Zaluzhzhia
- Zasluchchia
- Zelen
- Zolote
- Kolky
- Kryvytsia
- Krupove
- Kurash
- Lisove
- Litvytsia
- Luhove
- Liudyn
- Liutynsk
- Myliach
- Mochulyshche
- Nyvetsk
- Ozersk
- Orvianytsia
- Osova
- Ostrivtsi
- Partyzanske
- Perebrody
- Pidlisne
- Porubka
- Pratsiuky
- Rizky
- Rudnia
- Svarytsevychi
- Selets
- Smorodsk
- Solomiivka
- Tryputnia
- Tumen
- Udrytsk
- Uzlissia
- Khylin
- Khochyn
- Shakhy
- Yasynets

== Hoshcha Raion (Гощанський район) ==
- Andrusiyiv
- Andrusiiv
- Babyn
- Bashyne
- Bochanytsia
- Buhryn
- Vytkiv
- Vilhir
- Vovkoshiv
- Voroniv
- Voskodavy
- Hlybochok
- Horbakiv
- Horbiv
- Dmytrivka
- Dorohobuzh
- Drozdiv
- Druzhne
- Duliby
- Zhavriv
- Zhalianka
- Zarichne
- Illin
- Kolesnyky
- Krasnosillia
- Krynychky
- Kurozvany
- Lypky
- Liutsyniv
- Maikiv
- Malynivka
- Maliatyn
- Matiivka
- Mykulyn
- Mychiv
- Mnyshyn
- Moshchony
- Miatyn
- Novostavtsi
- Oleksiivka
- Pashuky
- Pidlisky
- Podoliany
- Polivtsi
- Posiahva
- Pustomyty
- Richytsia
- Rusyvel
- Riasnyky
- Sadove
- Serhiivka
- Symoniv
- Syniv
- Terentiiv
- Tomakhiv
- Tuchyn
- Uhiltsi
- Fedorivka
- Franivka
- Chudnytsia
- Shkariv
- Yuchyn
- Yasne

== Korets Raion (Корецький район) ==
- Berezivka
- Bohdanivka
- Bokshyn
- Braniv
- Brykiv
- Velyka Kletska
- Velyki Mezhyrichi
- Vesniane
- Hannivka
- Hvizdiv
- Holovnytsia
- Holychivka
- Horodyshche
- Danychiv
- Dermanka
- Dyven
- Zhadkivka
- ZHornivka
- Zabara
- Zaliznytsia
- Zastavia
- Ivanivka
- Kalynivka
- Kozak
- Koloverty
- Kolodiivka
- Kopytiv
- Koryst
- Kryliv
- Mala Kletska
- Mala Sovpa
- Morozivka
- Nevirkiv
- Novyi Korets
- Novyny
- Richechyna
- Richky
- Samostrily
- Sapozhyn
- Svitanok
- Staryi Korets
- Stovpyn
- Storozhiv
- Topcha
- Ustia
- Frankopil
- Kharaluh
- Chernytsia
- Shchekychyn

== Kostopil Raion (Костопільський район) ==
- Bazaltove
- Berestovets
- Bychal
- Borshchivka
- Briushkiv
- Velyka Liubasha
- Velykyi Mydsk
- Velykyi Stydyn
- Vyhin
- Volytsia
- Hannivka
- Hlazheva
- Holovyn
- Huta
- Danchymist
- Derazhne
- Diuksyn
- Zhalyn, Ukraine
- Zhylzha
- Zbuzh
- Zvizdivka
- Zlazne
- Zolotolyn
- Ivanychi
- Hora
- Komarivka
- Korchyn
- Korchivia
- Kosmachiv
- Ledne
- Lisopil
- Maidan
- Mala Liubasha
- Malyi Mydsk
- Malyi Stydyn
- Marianivka
- Mashcha
- Myrne
- Mokvyn
- Mokvynski KHutory
- Novyi Berestovets
- Oleksandrivka
- Osova
- Penkiv
- Perelysianka
- Peretoky
- Pidluzhne
- Piskiv
- Postiine
- Rokytne
- Rudnia
- Sadky
- Solomka
- Stavok
- Susk
- Tykhe
- Trostianets
- Trubytsi
- Chudvy
- Yapolot
- Yasnobir

== Mlyniv Raion (Млинівський район) ==
- Arshychyn
- Baboloky
- Bakoryn
- Berehy
- Bohushivka
- Bokiima
- Borbyn
- Boremets
- Bryshchi
- Budy
- Velyka Horodnytsia
- Velyke (Mlyniv Raion)
- Viinytsia
- Vladyslavivka
- Vovnychi
- Hnativka
- Holovchytsi
- Honcharykha
- Dobriatyn
- Dovhoshyi
- Dolyna
- Zabolotyntsi
- Zabolottia
- Zavallia
- Zahatyntsi
- Zalavia
- Zboriv
- Zoriane
- Ivanivka
- Ivankivtsi
- Klyn
- Koblyn
- Kozyrshchyna
- Korablyshche
- Kosareve
- Krasne
- Lykhachivka
- Lukarivka
- Malyn
- Mali Dorohostai
- Malovane
- Mantyn
- Maslianka
- Mykolaivka
- Moskovshchyna
- Moshkiv
- Miatyn
- Nadchytsi
- Nove
- Novyna-Dobriatynska
- Novyny
- Novoselivka
- Novosilky
- Novoukrainka
- Ozliiv
- Ostriiv
- Ostrozhets (Mlyniv Raion)
- Pevzha
- Pekaliv
- Pereverediv
- Peremylivka
- Pidbrusyn
- Pidhai
- Pidhaitsi
- Pidlistsi
- Pidloztsi
- Pitushkiv
- Posnykiv
- Pryvitne
- Puhachivka
- Piannie
- Radiv
- Richyshche
- Rudlyve
- Svyshchiv
- Smordva
- Stavyshche
- Stavriv
- Stomorhy
- Tereshiv
- Topillia
- Torhovytsia
- Travneve
- Tushebyn
- Uzhynets
- Uizdtsi
- Ulianivka
- Khorupan
- Chekno
- Yablunivka
- Jałowicze
- Yaroslavychi

== Ostroh Raion (Острозький район) ==
- Badivka
- Batkivtsi
- Bilashiv
- Bolotkivtsi
- Brodiv
- Brodivske
- Bubnivka
- Bukhariv
- Velbivno
- Verkhiv
- Vyshenky
- Viliia
- Voloskivtsi
- Hai
- Hremiache
- Hroziv
- Danylivka
- Derevianche
- Dubyny
- Zavydiv
- Zavyziv
- Illiashivka
- Kraiv
- Kurazh
- Kurhany
- Kutianka
- Lebedi
- Liuchyn
- Mezhyrich
- Myliatyn
- Mykhailivka
- Mykhalkivtsi
- Mohyliany
- Moshchanytsia
- Novomalyn
- Novorodchytsi
- Ozhenyn
- Ploske
- Posyva
- Pochapky
- Prykordonne
- Raduzhne
- Rozvazh
- Sadky
- Siiantsi
- Slobidka
- Stadnyky
- Teremne
- Tesiv
- Tochevyky
- Ukrainka
- Khoriv
- Khriniv
- Cherniakhiv
- Shliakh

== Radyvyliv Raion (Радивилівський район) ==
- Adamivka
- Balky
- Baranne
- Batkiv
- Basharivka
- Bezodnia
- Berezyny
- Bilohorivka
- Boratyn
- Bryhadyrivka
- Buhaivka
- Vesele
- Hai-Leviatynski
- Hai
- Haiky
- Haiky-Sytenski
- Hnylche
- Honoratka
- Hranivka
- Husary
- Dobryvoda
- Dovhalivka
- Druzhba
- Dubyny
- Zamishchyna
- Zarichne
- Zasuv
- Ivanivka
- Ivashchuky
- Kazmiri
- Karpylivka
- Kozyn
- Kopani
- Korytne
- Koty
- Kruky
- Krupets
- Kursyky
- Leviatyn
- Mali Haiky
- Mytnytsia
- Mykhailivka
- Nemyrivka
- Nova Mytnytsia
- Nova Pliasheva
- Novoukrainske
- Oparypsy
- Ostriv
- Pasiky
- Pereniatyn
- Pidvysoke
- Pidzamche
- Pidlypky
- Pliasheva
- Pliashivka
- Polunychne
- Prysky
- Pustoivanne
- Radykhivshchyna
- Ridkiv
- Rudnia
- Savchuky
- Serednie
- Sestriatyn
- Sytne
- Soloniv
- Sribne
- Stanislavy
- Staryky
- Stoianivka
- Tabachuky
- Tesluhiv
- Khotyn

== Rivne Raion (Рівненський район) ==
- Antopil
- Barmaky
- Bila Krynytsia
- Biliv
- Bilivski Khutory
- Boianivka
- Bronnyky
- Velyka Omeliana
- Velykyi Zhytyn
- Velykyi Oleksyn
- Velykyi Shpakiv
- Veresneve
- Verkhivsk
- Voloshky
- Hlynky
- Holyshiv
- Horynhrad Druhyi
- Horynhrad Pershyi
- Horodyshche
- Horodok, Rivne Raion
- Hrabiv
- Hrushvytsia Druha
- Hrushvytsia Persha
- Humennyky
- Dvorovychi
- Dereviane
- Dykiv
- Dibrivka
- Duby
- Diadkovychi
- Zhobryn
- Zaborol
- Zahoroshcha
- Zaritsk
- Zaborol
- Zoziv
- Zoria
- Ivanychi
- Karaievychi
- Karpylivka
- Kozlyn
- Kolodenka
- Kornyn
- Kotiv
- Kryvychi
- Kruhle
- Kustyn
- Makoterty
- Malyi Zhytyn
- Malyi Oleksyn
- Malyi Shpakiv
- Martynivka
- Metkiv
- Mylostiv
- Mykhailivka
- Mochulky
- Nova Liubomyrka
- Nova Ukrainka, Ukraine
- Novozhukiv
- Novostav
- Novostav-Dalnii
- Obariv
- Oleksandriia
- Olyshva
- Peredily
- Peresopnytsia
- Pidhirtsi
- Ploska
- Ponebel
- Porozove
- Pukhova
- Radyslavka
- Radukhivka
- Remel
- Reshutsk
- Rysvianka
- Rohachiv
- Rubche
- Ruda-Krasna
- Sviattia
- Serhiivka
- Smorzhiv
- Stavky
- Starozhukiv
- Sukhivtsi
- Taikury
- Try Koptsi
- Uhlyshche
- Khodosy
- Khotyn
- Shostakiv
- Shpaniv
- Shubkiv
- Yasynynychi

== Rokytne Raion (Рокитнівський район) ==
- Berezove
- Bilovizh
- Bilsk
- Blazhove
- Borove
- Buda
- Budky-Kamianski
- Budky-Snovydovytski
- Vezhytsia
- Hlynne
- Hrabun
- Dert
- Drozdyn
- Dubno
- Yelne
- Zabolottia
- Zalavia
- Kamiane
- Karpylivka
- Kysorychi
- Kupel
- Lisove
- Masevychi
- Mushni
- Netreba
- Obsich
- Oleksandrivka
- Osnytsk
- Ostky
- Perekhodychi
- Poznan
- Rokytne
- Snovydovychi
- Stare Selo
- Staryky
- Tomashhorod
- Khmil

== Sarny Raion (Сарненський район) ==
- Biliatychi
- Buteiky
- Velyke Verbche
- Vyry
- Vyrka
- Vysove
- Volosha
- Hlushytske
- Hlushytsia
- Hranitne
- Hrushivka
- Huta-Pereima
- Dvirets
- Dovhe
- Dubky
- Dubniaky
- Zarivia
- Znosychi
- Ivanivka
- Kalynivka
- Kamiane-Sluchanske
- Karasyn
- Karpylivka
- Katerynivka
- Klesiv
- Kopyshche
- Korost
- Kostiantynivka
- Krychylsk
- Kuzmivka
- Liubykovychi
- Liukhcha
- Male Verbche
- Marianivka
- Maslopushcha
- Melnytsia
- Nemovychi
- Obirky
- Odrynky
- Oleksiivka
- Orlivka
- Pidhirnyk
- Poliana
- Puhach
- Remchytsi
- Rudnia-Karpylivska
- Selyshche
- Strilsk
- Tynne
- Triskyni
- Trudy
- Tutovychi
- Uberezh
- Uhly
- Fedorivka
- Tseptsevychi
- Chabel
- Chudel
- Yablunka
- Yarynivka
- Yasnohirka

== Volodymyrets Raion (Володимирецький район) ==
- Antonivka
- Babka
- Balakhovychi
- Berezyna
- Berestivka
- Byshliak
- Bile
- Bilska Volia
- Velykyi Zholudsk
- Velyki Telkovychi
- Velyki Tseptsevychi
- Velykhiv
- Vereteno
- Voronky
- Horodets
- Horodok
- Dibrova
- Dovhovolia
- Dubivka
- Zhovkyni
- Zhuravlyne
- Zabolottia
- Zelene
- Zelenytsia
- Ivanchi
- Kanonychi
- Kidry
- Koshmaky
- Krasnosillia
- Krymne
- Kruhle
- Lypne
- Lozky
- Luko
- Liubakhy
- Malyi Zholudsk
- Mali Telkovychi
- Maiunychi
- Mostyshche
- Mulchytsi
- Netreba
- Novaky
- Novosilky
- Ozero
- Ozertsi
- Ostriv
- Ostrivtsi
- Polytsi
- Polovli
- Radyzheve
- Romeiky
- Rudka
- Svaryni
- Sobishchytsi
- Sopachiv
- Soshnyky
- Stara Rafalivka
- Stepanhorod
- Sukhovolia
- Urichchia
- Khynochi
- Chakva
- Chudlia
- Chucheve
- Shchokiv

== Zarichne Raion (Зарічненський район) ==
- Bir
- Borove
- Brodnytsia
- Butove
- Vychivka
- Vovchytsi
- Holubne
- Horynychi
- Dibrivsk
- Didivka
- Dubchytsi
- Zhdan
- Zadovzhe
- Zaozeria
- Dibrova
- Ivanchytsi
- Komory
- Konyk
- Kotyra
- Kutyn
- Kutynok
- Kukhitska Volia
- Kukhche
- Lysychyn
- Loknytsia
- Liubyn
- Mlyn
- Mlynok
- Morochne
- Mutvytsia
- Nenkovychi
- Nyhovyshchi
- Nobel
- Novorichytsia
- Novosillia
- Oleksandrove
- Omyt
- Ostrivsk
- Perekallia
- Pryvitivka
- Prykladnyky
- Radove
- Richytsia
- Richky
- Senchytsi
- Sernyky
- Solomyr
- Tykhovyzh
- Khrapyn
- Chernyn

== Zdolbuniv Raion (Здолбунівський район) ==
- Bilashiv
- Bohdashiv
- Borshchivka Druha
- Borshchivka Persha
- Buderazh
- Bushcha
- Viunivshchyna
- Hilcha Druha
- Hilcha Persha
- Hlynsk
- Derman Druha
- Derman Persha
- Zahora
- Zahreblia
- Zalibivka
- Zalissia
- Zamlynok
- Zdovbytsia
- Zelenyi Dub
- Ivachkiv
- Ilpin
- Klopit
- Kopytkove
- Korshiv
- Koshativ
- Kunyn
- Lidavo
- Mala Moshchanytshia
- Marianivka
- Myrotyn
- Mizochok
- Mosty
- Nova Moshchanytsia
- Novyi Svit
- Novomylsk
- Novosilki
- Ozerko
- Orestiv
- Pivche
- Pidhaine
- Pidtsurkiv
- Piatyhory
- Sviate
- Spasiv
- Stara Moshchanytsia
- Steblivka
- Stepanivka
- Stupno
- Suimy
- Uizdtsi
- Urvenna
- Tsurkiv
