= Novomalyn =

Novomalyn Новомалин
- Village
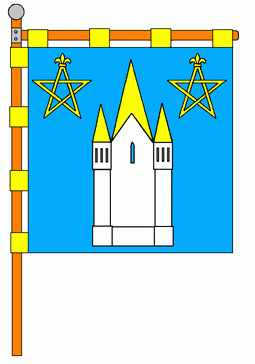
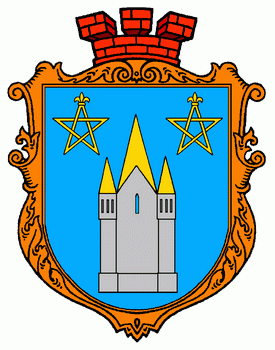
- Flag Coat of arms

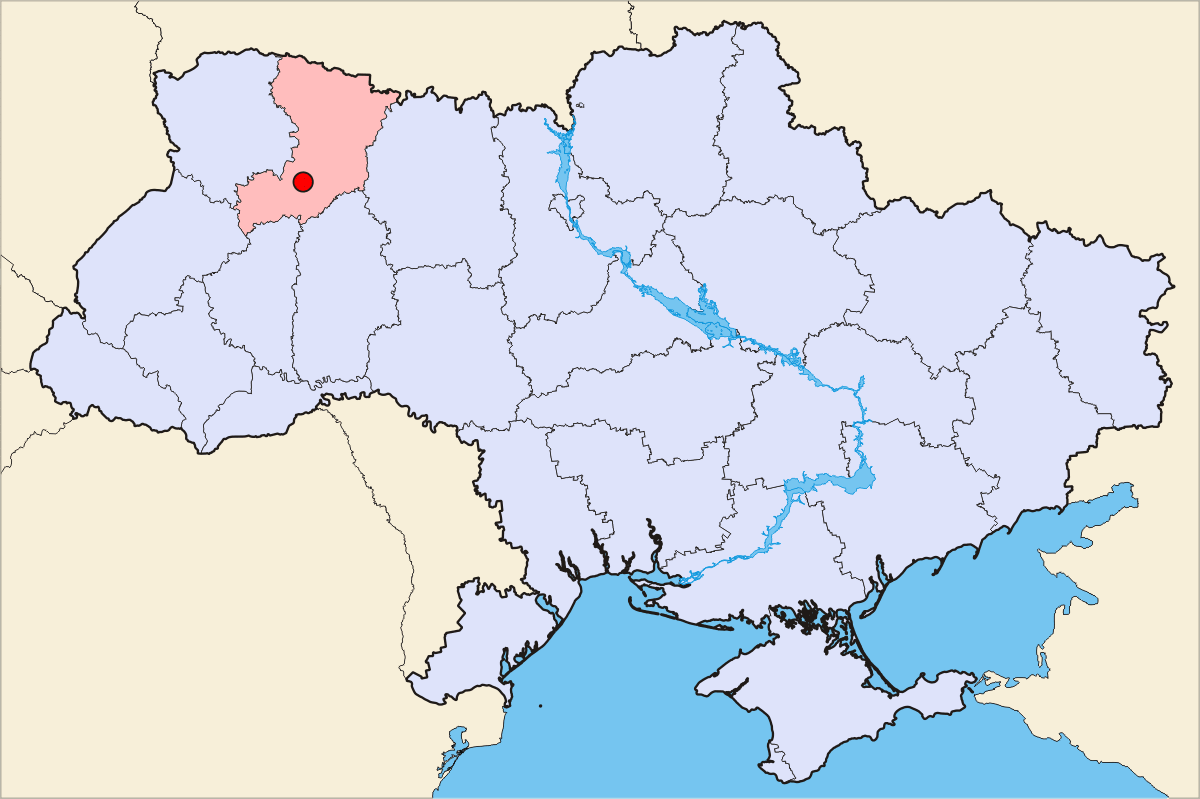
- Location within the Rivne Oblast
- Coordinates: 50°17′53″N 26°21′59″E
- Country: Ukraine
- Oblast: Rivne Oblast
- Raion: Rivne Raion
- Silska Rada: Novomalyn Silska Rada
- Founded: 1396

Area
  - Total: 2.573 km^{2} (0.993 sq mi)
- Elevation: 214 m (702 ft)

Population (2001)
  - Total: 677
  - Estimate (2024): 537
  - Density: 263.12/km^{2} (681.5/sq mi)
- Time zone: UTC+2 (EET)
  - Summer (DST): UTC+3 (EEST)
- Postal code (Index): 35843
- Area code: +380 3654

Novomalyn (Ukrainian: Новомалин, Russian: Новомалин, Polish: Nowomalin) is a village in Rivne Raion, Rivne Oblast, Ukraine, but was formerly administered within Ostroh Raion. As of the year 2001, the community had 677 residents. The postal code is 35843, and the KOATUU code is 5624285601.
