= Zlazne =

Zlazne Злазне
- Village
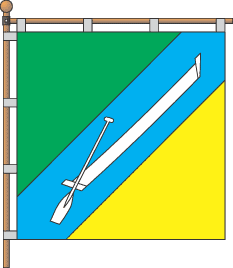
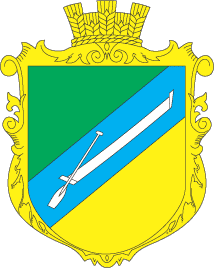
- Flag Coat of arms

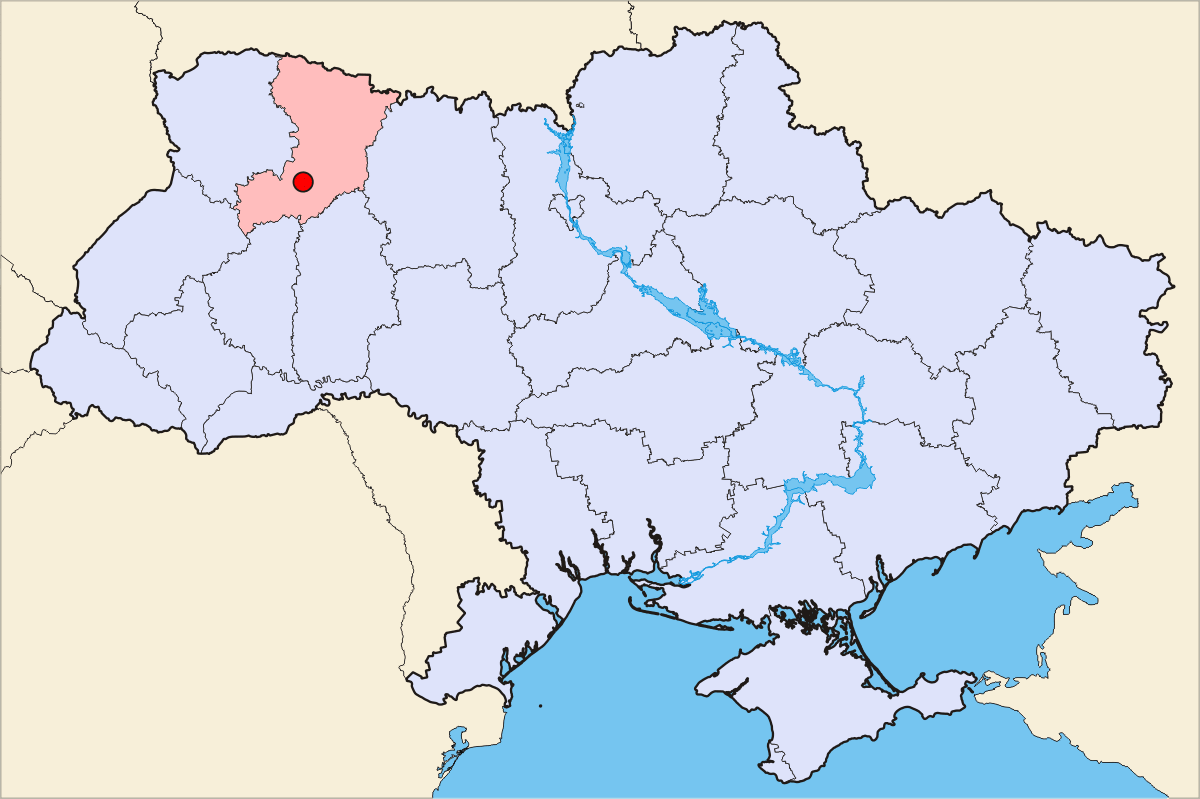
- Location within the Rivne Oblast
- Coordinates: 50°56′03″N 26°13′12″E
- Country: Ukraine
- Oblast: Rivne Oblast
- Raion: Rivne Raion
- Silska Rada: Zlazne Silska Rada
- Founded: 1577

Area
  - Total: 3.02 km^{2} (1.17 sq mi)
- Elevation: 180 m (590 ft)

Population (2001)
  - Total: 1,593
  - Density: 527/km^{2} (1,360/sq mi)
- Time zone: UTC+2 (EET)
  - Summer (DST): UTC+3 (EEST)
- Postal code: 35040
- Area code: +380 3657

Zlazne (Ukrainian: Злазне) is a village in Rivne Raion, Rivne Oblast, Ukraine, but was formerly administered within Kostopil Raion. In 2001, the community had 1593 residents. Its postal code is 35040.
