= Penkiv =

Penkiv Пеньків
- Village
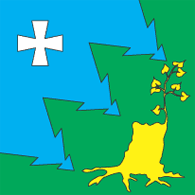
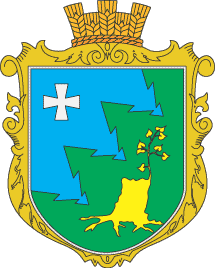
- Flag Coat of arms

- Location within Ukraine Penkiv (Ukraine)
- Coordinates: 51°01′43″N 26°27′24″E
- Country: Ukraine
- Oblast: Rivne Oblast
- Raion: Rivne Raion
- Silska Rada: Penkiv Silska Rada
- Founded: 1939 (official)

Area
  - Total: 1.24 km^{2} (0.48 sq mi)
- Elevation: 177 m (581 ft)

Population (2001)
  - Total: 292
  - Density: 235/km^{2} (610/sq mi)
- Time zone: UTC+2 (EET)
  - Summer (DST): UTC+3 (EEST)
- Postal code: 35020
- Area code: +380 3657

Penkiv (Ukrainian: Пеньків) is a village in Kostopil urban hromada, Rivne Raion, Rivne Oblast, Ukraine, but was formerly administered within Kostopil Raion. As of the year 2001, the community had 292 residents. Postal code: 35020.

== Geography ==
Penkiv is located in of the Kostopil urban territorial community. The village is located on the Volhynian Upland, on the right bank of the Horyn River, a left tributary of the Pripyat River (Dnipro basin).

The climate of the region is moderately continental: winter is mild (in January -4.4 °, -5.1 °), with unstable frosts; summer is warm (in July +18.8 °), not hot. Most often, comfortable weather is observed in the summer months. The formation of stable snow cover is noted in the second decade of December. Rainfall 550 mm per year. The relief of the village is flat, partly lowland, covered with pine and oak forests.

To the east of the village is the national highway of Ukraine H-25, which can be used to reach Sarny or Rivne.

== History ==
The village has been known since the 18th century as Penkiv. The name of the village is derived from the village's own name Pemko or Penko. According to another version, there were dense forests on the site of the village. Three villagers came from the village of Kosmachiv and cut down part of the forest, and built their houses on the stumps. Hence the name of the village.

== Coat of arms ==
The symbols of the village were approved by the decision of the village council No. 97 dated September 30, 2003

=== Coat of arms ===
On the coat of arms, the shield is beveled to the left with a herringbone cut, on the upper blue field there is a silver cross - a symbol of Volhynia, in the lower green field - a golden stump, from which a creeper with leaves grows, as a symbol of the beginning, revival.

=== Flag ===
A square cloth consists of three equal horizontal stripes - blue, yellow and green, on the blue stripe near the flagpole there is a white cross. The stump indicates the name of the village, the branch means revival, and the cross is a symbol of faith, a sign of the Volhynian land. The blue color represents Maryanivske Lake, gold (yellow) - the agricultural industries of the village, green - the forestry of the village.
