= Kostopil urban hromada =

Municipality in Rivne Oblast, Ukraine

Kostopil urban hromada Костопільська міська громада
- Hromada
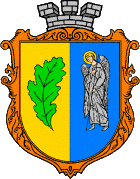
- Seal

- Location within Rivne Oblast Location within Ukraine
- Coordinates: 50°52′59″N 26°26′46″E
- Country: Ukraine
- Oblast (province): Rivne Oblast
- Raion (district): Rivne Raion
- Established: 2020
- Administrative center: Kostopil

Area
  - Total: 653.4 km^{2} (252.3 sq mi)
- Elevation: 182 m (597 ft)

Population (2022)
  - Total: 44,042
  - Density: 67.40/km^{2} (174.6/sq mi)

Kostopil urban territorial hromada (Ukrainian: Костопільська міська територіальна громада, romanized: Kostopilska miska terytorialna hromada) is a hromada located in the Rivne Oblast of western Ukraine. Its seat of government is the city of Kostopil. The hromada currently covers an area of 653.4 square kilometers, and has a total population of 44,042 (2022 est.)

== Geography ==
The Kostopil urban territorial hromada borders the Volyn Oblast of Ukraine.

The relief of the hromada is flat, partly lowland, covered with pine and oak forests. Kostopil urban territorial hromada has reserves of basalt, chalk, clay.

The larger area of the Kostopil urban territorial hromada is located in the Volhynian Upland, in the north - on the Polesian Lowland. Kostopil hromada is located in the basin of the Pripyat River, its right tributary, the Horyn, flows through the district.

=== Climate ===
Kostopil urban hromada has a humid continental warm summer climate (Dfb). It sees the least rainfall in February, with an average precipitation of 42 mm; and the most in July, with 107 mm of average rainfall.

Climate data for Kostopil
Month	Jan	Feb	Mar	Apr	May	Jun	Jul	Aug	Sep	Oct	Nov	Dec	Year
Mean daily maximum °C (°F)	−1.2 (29.8)	0.4 (32.7)	6.1 (43.0)	13.9 (57.0)	19.4 (66.9)	22.5 (72.5)	24.4 (75.9)	23.8 (74.8)	18.5 (65.3)	12 (54)	6.1 (43.0)	1 (34)	12.2 (54.1)
Daily mean °C (°F)	−3.3 (26.1)	−2.3 (27.9)	2.1 (35.8)	9.1 (48.4)	14.7 (58.5)	18.3 (64.9)	20.1 (68.2)	19.4 (66.9)	14.4 (57.9)	8.5 (47.3)	3.8 (38.8)	−0.9 (30.4)	8.7 (47.6)
Mean daily minimum °C (°F)	−5.7 (21.7)	−5.2 (22.6)	−1.9 (28.6)	3.9 (39.0)	9.4 (48.9)	13.3 (55.9)	15.4 (59.7)	14.7 (58.5)	10.3 (50.5)	5.2 (41.4)	1.5 (34.7)	−3 (27)	4.8 (40.7)
Average rainfall mm (inches)	45 (1.8)	42 (1.7)	49 (1.9)	53 (2.1)	72 (2.8)	83 (3.3)	107 (4.2)	70 (2.8)	66 (2.6)	49 (1.9)	50 (2.0)	49 (1.9)	735 (29)
Source: Climate-Data.org

== Settlements ==
The hromada comprises one city, Kostopil, and the following 29 villages:

- Bryushkiv
- Huta
- Komarivka
- Korchivia
- Kosmachiv
- Ledne
- Maidan
- Maly Mydsk
- Maly Stydyn
- Marianivka
- Mokvynski Khutory
- Oleksandrivka
- Osova
- Penkiv
- Pidluzhne
- Piskiv
- Rokytne
- Rudnia
- Trostianets
- Trubytsi
- Velyka Liubasha
- Velykyi Mydsk
- Velykyi Stydyn
- Volytsia
- Yapolot
- Yasnobir
- Zbuzh
- Zhalyn
- Zolotolyn

== History ==
Since 1939, this region had been a part of Kostopil Raion. On 12 June 2020, the government of Ukraine approved Decree No. 722-r, which reformed the administrative divisions of Rivne Oblast. Under this decree, Kostopil Raion was merged into Rivne Raion, and its territory was divided into two territorial hromadas: Holovyn and Kostopil.

== See also ==
- List of hromadas of Ukraine
