= Yapolot =

Yapolot Яполоть
- Village
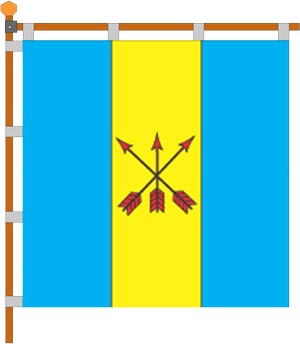
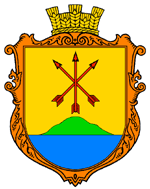
- Flag Seal

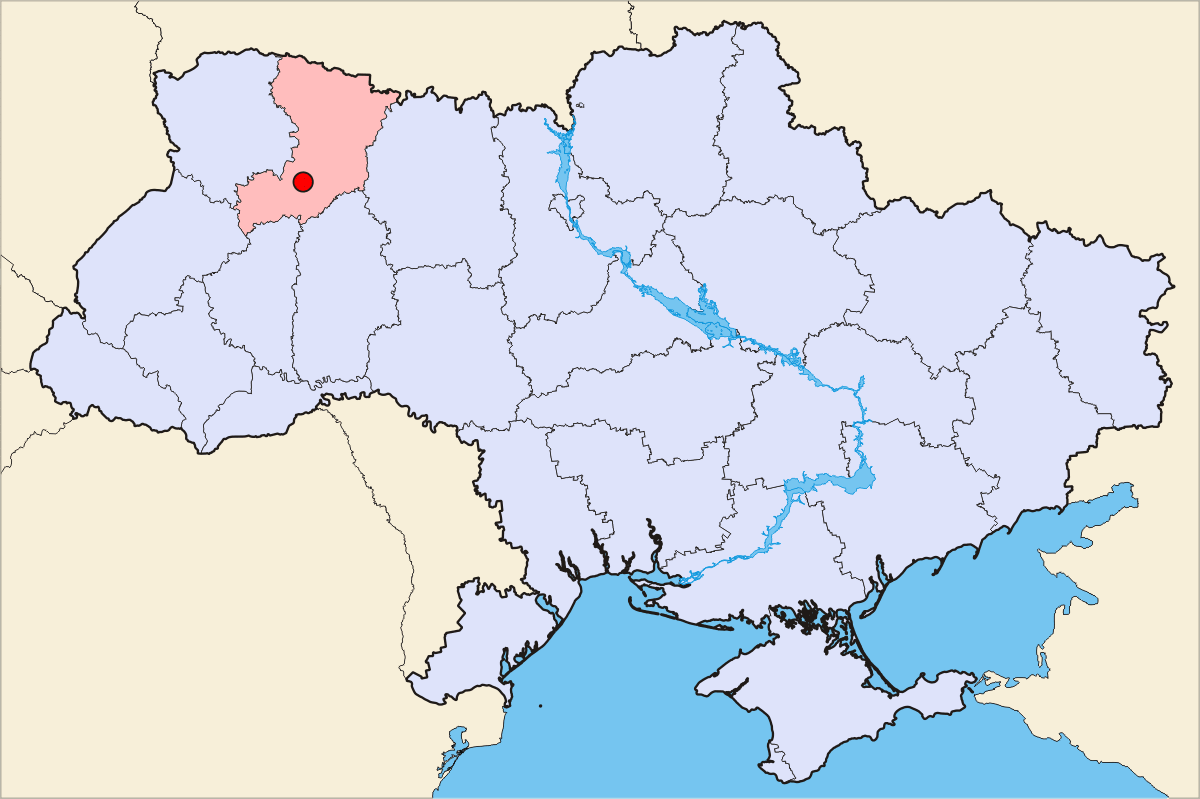
- Location within the Rivne Oblast
- Coordinates: 50°59′06″N 26°15′12″E
- Country: Ukraine
- Oblast: Rivne Oblast
- Raion: Rivne Raion
- Silska Rada: Yapolot Silska Rada
- Founded: 1577

Area
  - Total: 2.93 km^{2} (1.13 sq mi)
- Elevation: 169 m (554 ft)

Population (2024)
  - Total: 832
  - Density: 281/km^{2} (730/sq mi)
- Time zone: UTC+2 (EET)
  - Summer (DST): UTC+3 (EEST)
- Postal index: 35021
- Area code: +380 3657

Yapolot (Ukrainian: Яполоть) is a village in Kostopil urban hromada, Rivne Raion, Rivne Oblast, Ukraine, but was formerly administered within Kostopil Raion. As of the year 2024, the community had 832 residents. The postal index is 35021 and the KOATUU code is 5623487801.

== Geography ==
Yapolot is located in the center of the Kostopil urban territorial community. The village is located on the Volhynian Upland, on the left bank of the Horyn River, a left tributary of the Pripyat River (Dnipro basin).

The climate of the region is moderately continental: winter is mild (in January -4.4 °, -5.1 °), with unstable frosts; summer is warm (in July +18.8 °), not hot. Most often, comfortable weather is observed in the summer months. The formation of stable snow cover is noted in the second decade of December. Rainfall 550 mm per year. The relief of the village is flat, partly lowland, covered with pine and oak forests.

The T-18-17 regional highway passes through Yapolot, which intersects with the M06 international highway.

== History ==
The first written mention dates back to 1577. The name of the village is associated with the swampy terrain. People began to settle behind impassable swamps. This is how the names arose: Zabolot' - Yapolot' (according to grammatical features of melodiousness). In the 17th century. two battles with the Turks took place near the village.

== Population ==
=== Language ===
According to the 2001 census, 99.51% of the population of Yapolot considered Ukrainian to be their native language.

== Symbols ==
The symbols of the village were approved by the decision of the village council No. 86 of August 6, 2004

=== Coat of arms ===
A shield divided horizontally into two halves 3:2. On the upper part, on a golden background, there are three crossed red arrows and a green mound. The lower part is blue. The colors symbolize: gold - agriculture, green - forestry, blue - the Goryn River. The mound and arrows - the historical past of this region.

=== Flag ===
A square cloth is divided vertically into three equal parts, the right and left - blue, the middle - gold, on which three red arrows are placed. The banner carries the elements of the coat of arms.
