= Velykyi Mydsk =

Velykyi Mydsk Великий Мидськ
- Village
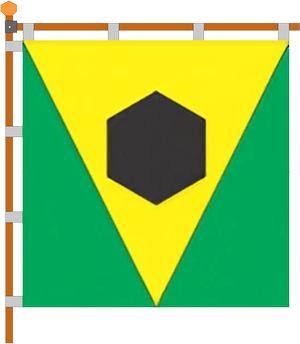
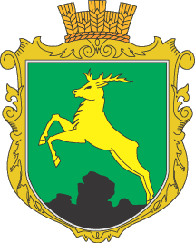
- Flag Coat of arms

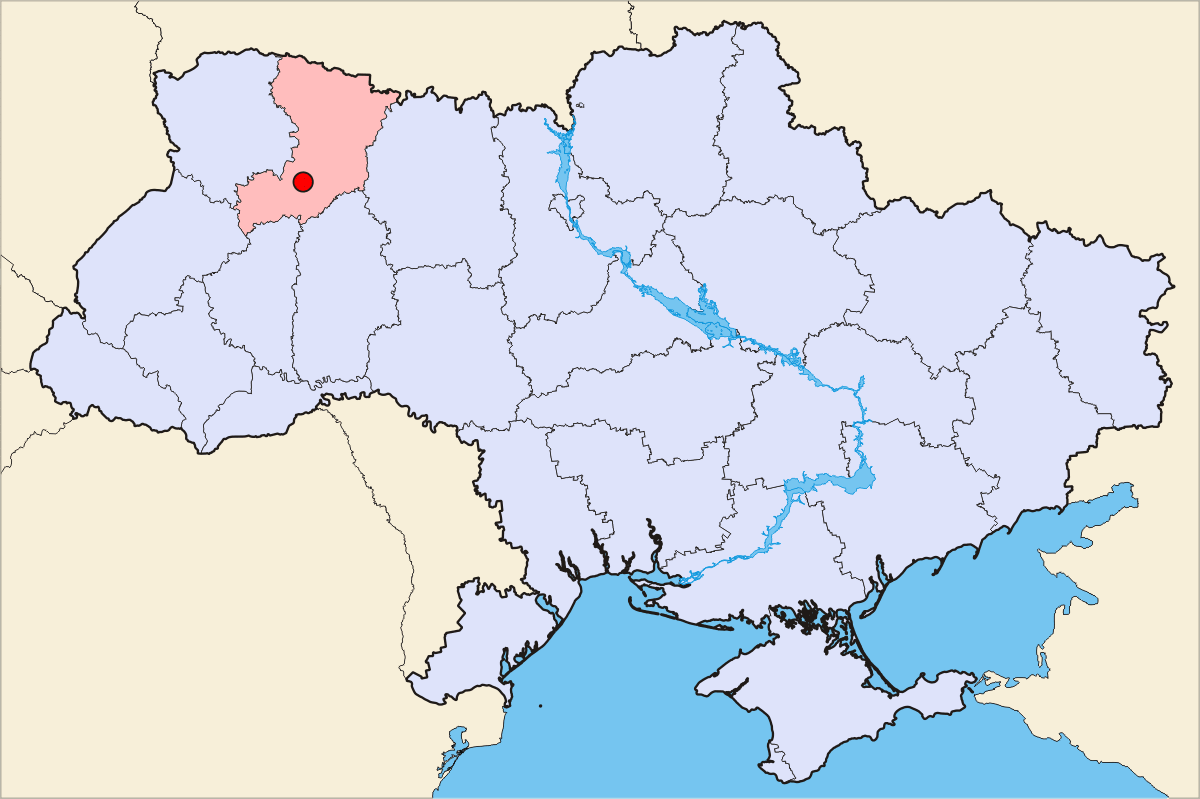
- Location within the Rivne Oblast
- Coordinates: 51°04′57″N 26°08′46″E
- Country: Ukraine
- Oblast: Rivne Oblast
- Raion: Rivne Raion
- Silska Rada: Velykyi Mydsk Silska Rada
- Founded: 1150

Area
  - Total: 5.92 km^{2} (2.29 sq mi)
- Elevation: 171 m (561 ft)

Population (2001)
  - Total: 911
  - Density: 154/km^{2} (400/sq mi)
- Time zone: UTC+2 (EET)
  - Summer (DST): UTC+3 (EEST)
- Postal code: 35012
- Area code: +380 3657

Velykyi Mydsk (Ukrainian: Великий Мидськ) is a village in Kostopil urban hromada, Rivne Raion, Rivne Oblast, Ukraine. The village is located on the Volhynian Upland. First mentioned in 1150 year. The postal code is 35012, and the KOATUU code is 5623480401. The village population is 911 people.

== Geography ==
Penkiv is located in of the Kostopil urban territorial community. The village is located on the Volhynian Upland, on the left bank of the Horyn River, a left tributary of the Pripyat River (Dnipro basin).

The climate of the region is moderately continental: winter is mild (in January -4.4 °, -5.1 °), with unstable frosts; summer is warm (in July +18.8 °), not hot. Most often, comfortable weather is observed in the summer months. The formation of stable snow cover is noted in the second decade of December. Rainfall 550 mm per year. The relief of the village is flat, partly lowland, covered with pine and oak forests.

The village specializes in growing grains and vegetables, and forestry.

== History ==
The first information about Michesk belong to 1150 year. Under the name of Medsko a village is known from 1577 year.

Velykyi Mydsk was formerly administered within Kostopil Raion. As of the year 2001, the community had 911 residents.

== Coat of arms ==
The symbols of the village were approved by the decision of the village council No. 70 dated December 30, 2003.

=== Coat of arms ===
The shield of the coat of arms has a green field on which a golden deer jumps over black stones.

=== Flag ===
The village flag is a square green cloth, from the upper corners of which a yellow wedge extends to the middle of the lower edge, and on it - a black hexagon. The black stones at the base of the coat of arms and the hexagon on the flag mean rich basalt deposits. The deer and the green field indicate the generous forests, which are protected areas.

== Architectural monuments ==
In the northern part of the village, a large wooden church dedicated to the Nativity of the Blessed Virgin Mary was built in 1904. It is considered one of the largest churches in the Kostopil urban hromada.
