= Marynyn =

Marynyn Маринин
- Village
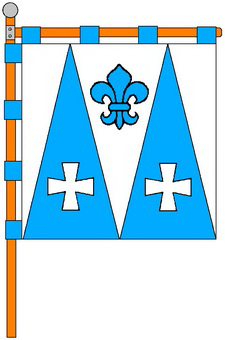
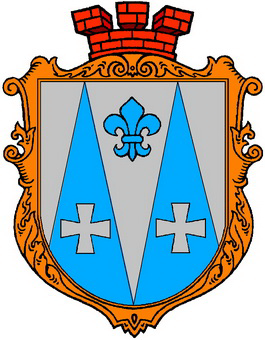
- Flag Coat of arms

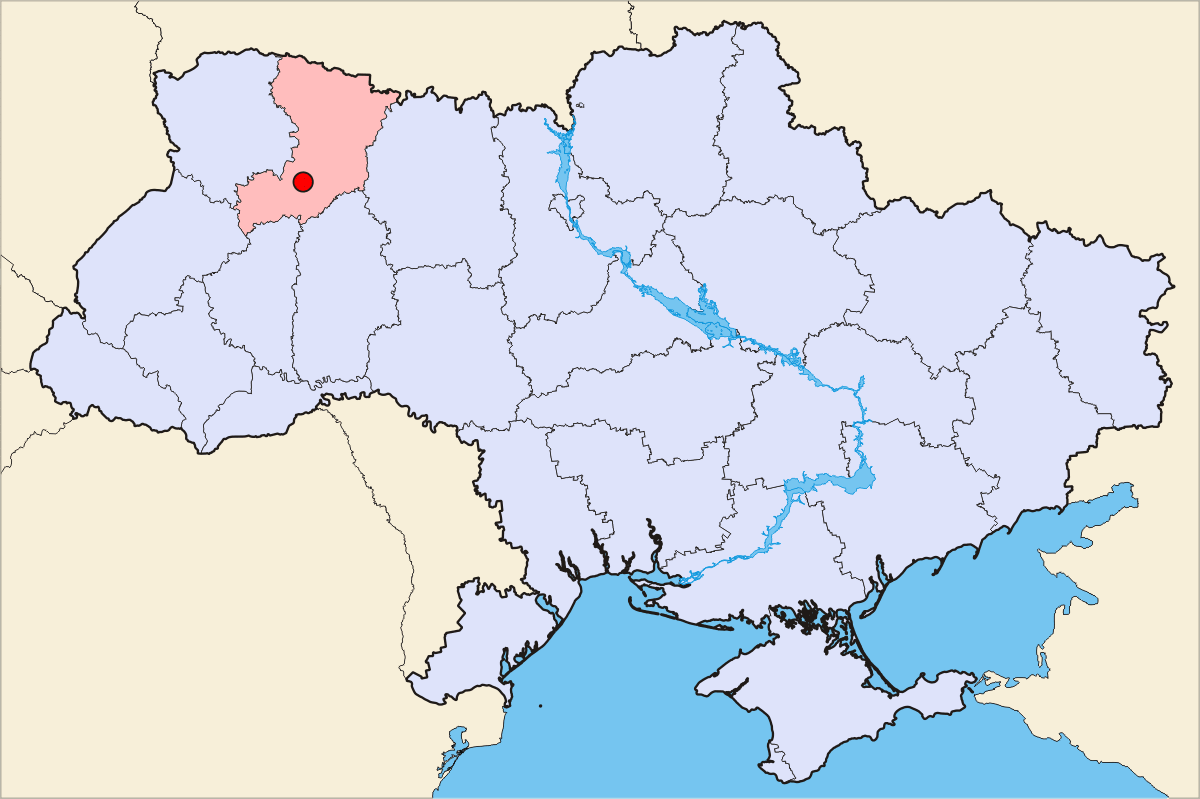
- Location within the Rivne Oblast
- Coordinates: 50°48′11″N 27°06′11″E
- Country: Ukraine
- Oblast: Rivne Oblast
- Raion: Rivne Raion
- Hromada: Sosnove settlement hromada
- Founded: 1488

Area
  - Total: 1.35 km^{2} (0.52 sq mi)
- Elevation: 209 m (686 ft)

Population (2001)
  - Total: 931
  - Density: 689.6/km^{2} (1,786/sq mi)
- Time zone: UTC+2 (EET)
  - Summer (DST): UTC+3 (EEST)
- Postal code (Index): 34655
- Area code: +380 3653

Marynyn (Ukrainian: Маринин) is a village in Rivne Raion, Rivne Oblast, Ukraine, but was formerly administered within Berezne Raion. In 2001 the community had 931 residents. Postal code — 35670. In 2017, a postage stamp featuring the coat of arms of Marynyn was released by Ukrposhta.
