= Yasynivka =

Yasnivka (Ukrainian: Ясинівка) may refer to the following places in Ukraine:

- Yasynivka, Donetsk Oblast
- Yasynivka, Rivne Oblast
