= Bohushi =

Village in Rivne Oblast, Ukraine

Coordinates: 51°06′26″N 26°44′38″E

Bohushi (Ukrainian: Богуші; Yiddish: Bohush) is a village in the Rivne Raion, Rivne Oblast, Ukraine, but was formerly administered within Berezne Raion.
