= Hubkiv =

Hubkiv Губків
- Village
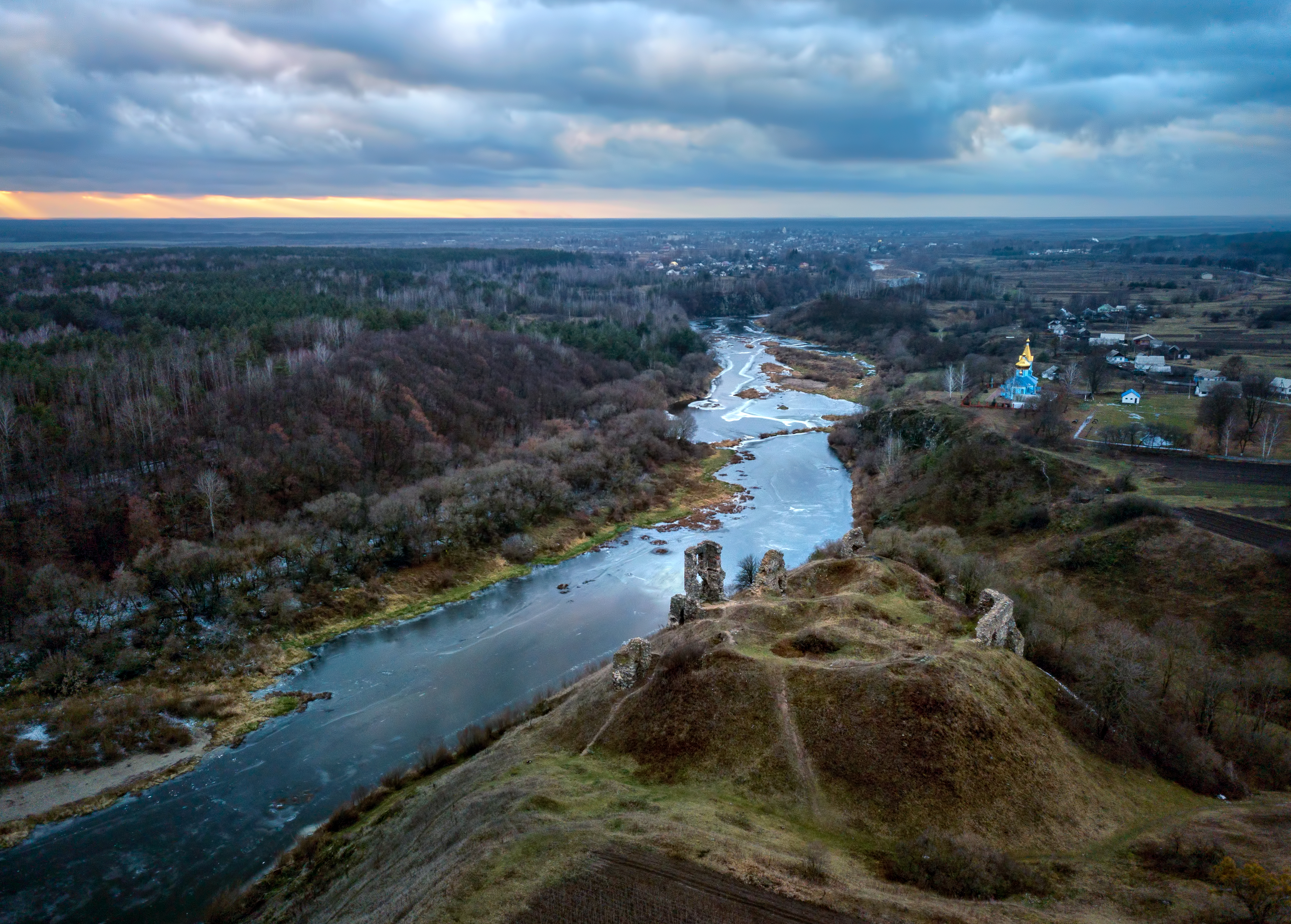
- Skyline of Hubkiv

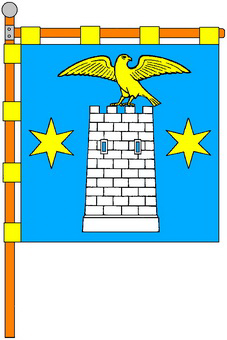
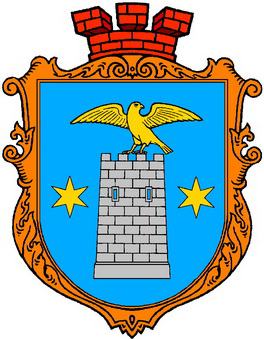
- Flag Coat of arms

- Location within Rivne Oblast Hubkiv (Ukraine)
- Coordinates: 50°49′50″N 27°03′04″E
- Country: Ukraine
- Oblast: Rivne Oblast
- Raion: Rivne Raion
- Hromada: Sosnove settlement hromada
- Founded: 15th century

Area
  - Total: 1.18 km^{2} (0.46 sq mi)
- Elevation: 196 m (643 ft)

Population (2001)
  - Total: 788
  - Density: 667.8/km^{2} (1,730/sq mi)
- Time zone: UTC+2 (EET)
  - Summer (DST): UTC+3 (EEST)
- Postal code: 34654
- Area code: +380 3653

Hubkiv (Ukrainian: Губків) is a village in Rivne Raion, Rivne Oblast, Ukraine, but was formerly administered within Berezne Raion. In 2001, the community had 788 residents. Postal code — 34654.

== Geography ==
Hubkiv is located in the valley created as a result of the waters of Sluch river breaking through granite rock formations.

== History ==
The first mention about the village of Hubkiv dates from 1504, when it was attacked by Tatars. In later it is sometimes named Khupkiv. Ruins of a 15th-century castle have been preserved in the village..

The village was owned by the Siemaszkos, but was later transferred to the Daniłowicz family, finally ending up in the property of Cetner family. The township and castle suffered from frequent attacks. In 1596 the troops of Hryhoriy Loboda attacked the fortification. In 1704 marked the township was robbed and destroyed as a result of the stationing of the Muscovite army, with not a single inn or wine cellar being spared by the occupiers. In 1708 Hubkiv castle was attacked by the Swedes, as a result of which the town fell into decay, ceasing to keep trade fairs and auctions.

During the period of German occupation, on 2 July 1943, local inhabitants, including children, were driven into the local church, which was then set on fire by the Germans. As a result, several hundreds of Hubkiv's inhabitants, including the local priest and psalm reader, lost their lives.

== Gallery ==
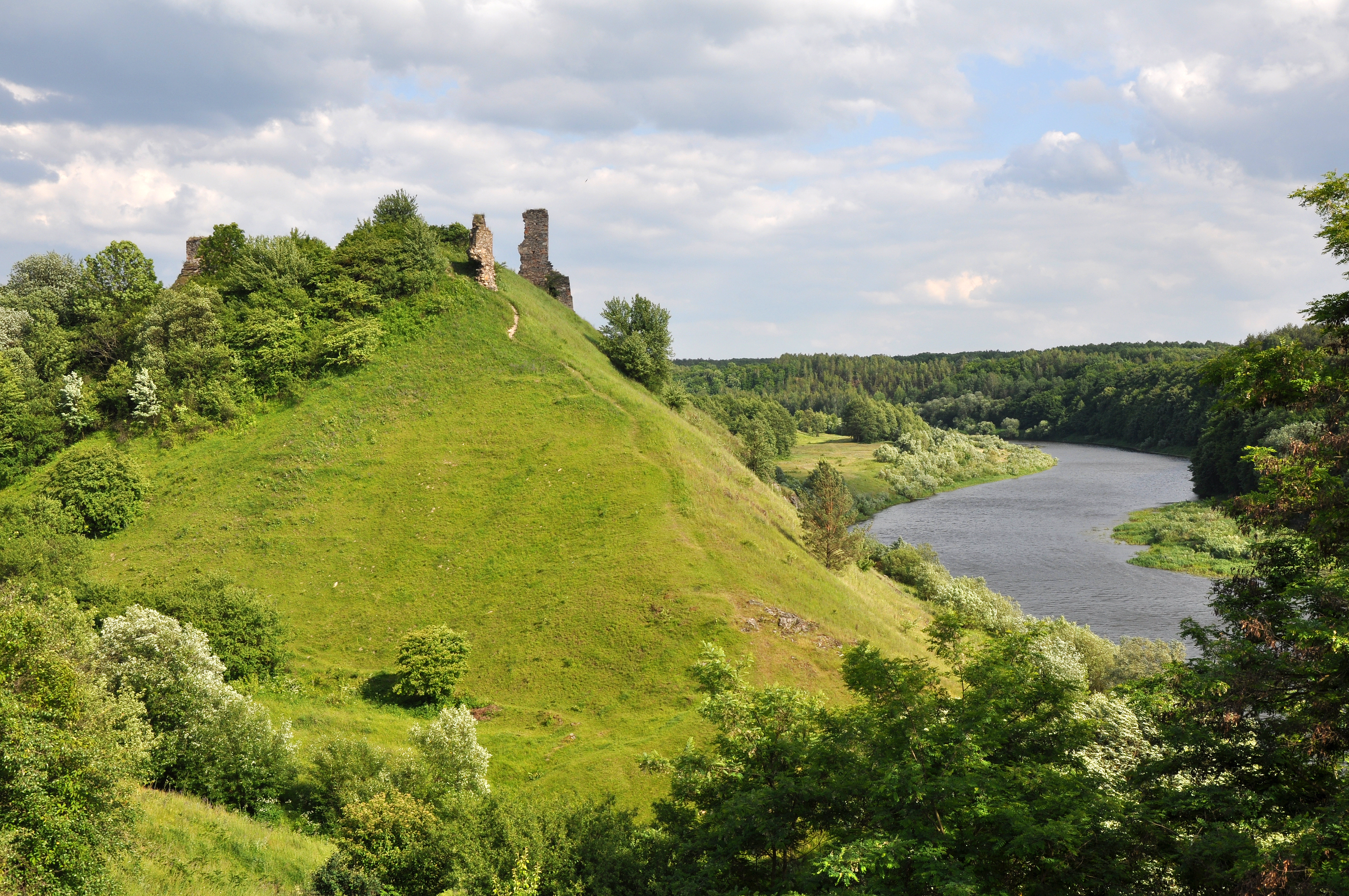
Ruins of the castle

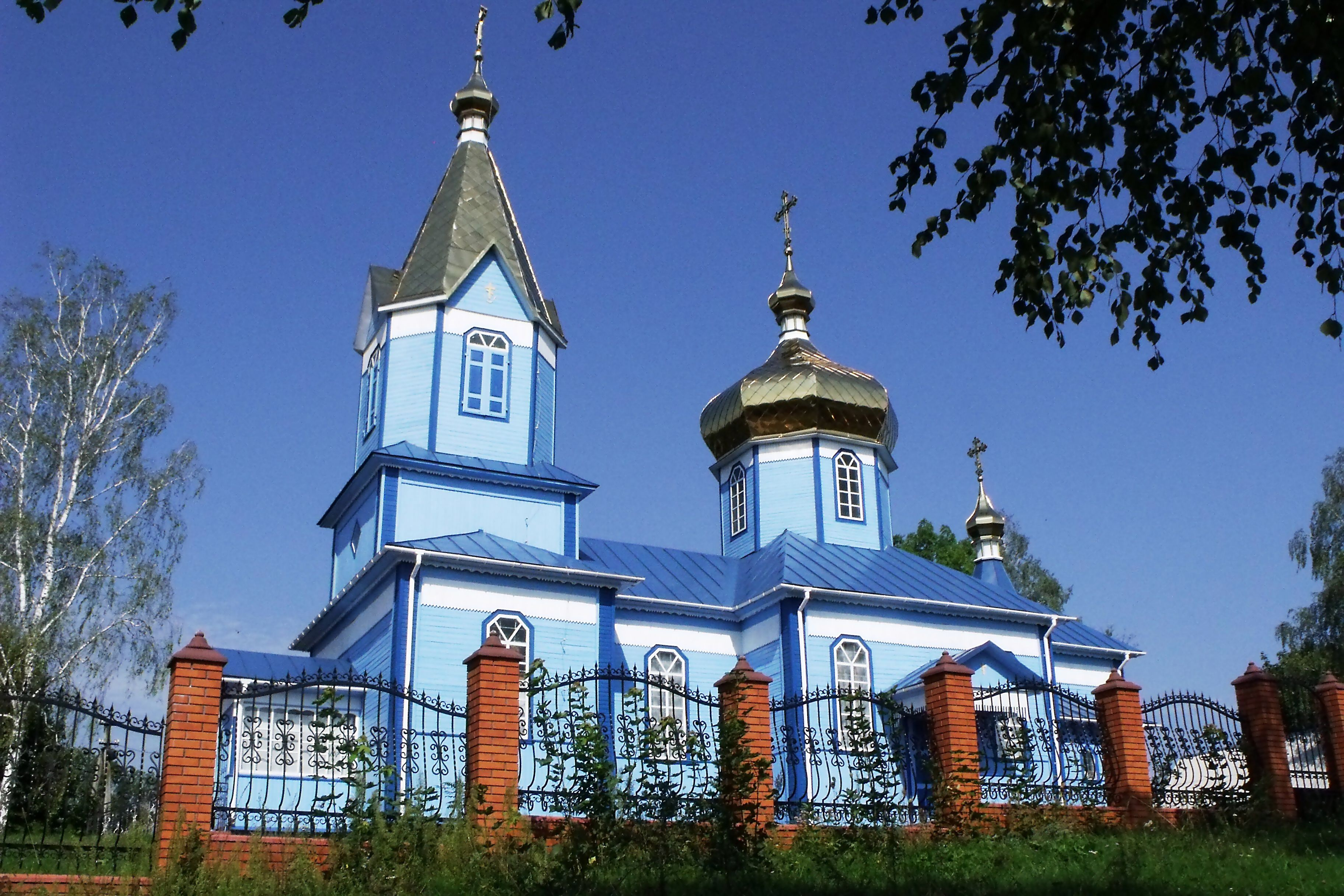
Village church

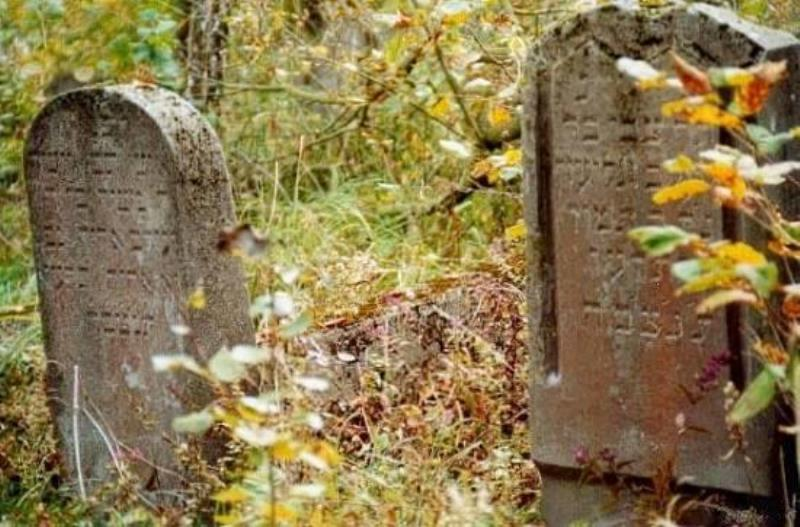
Graves at the Jewish cemetery

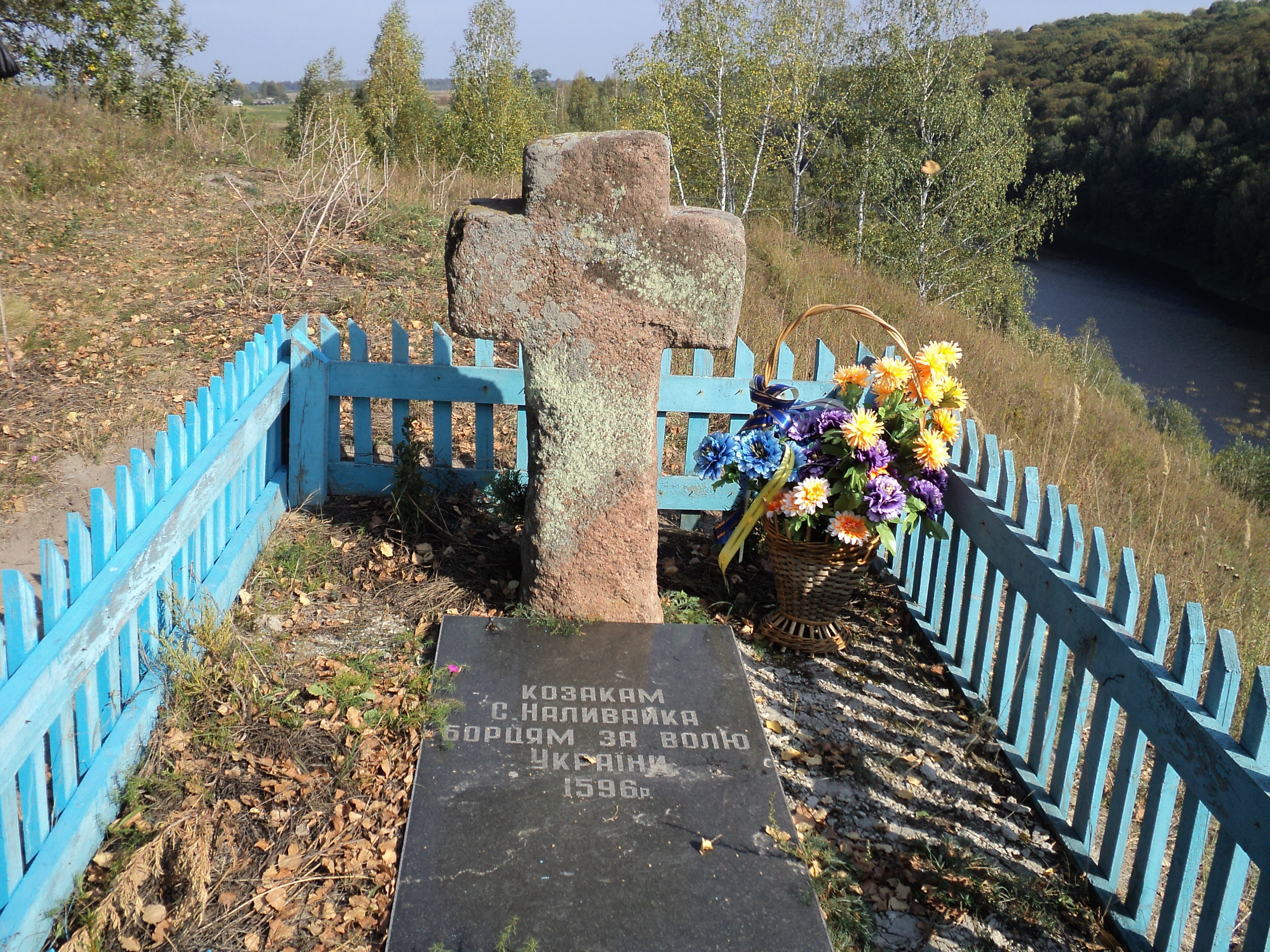
Memorial cross to Ukrainian Cossacks
