= Berezne =

City in Rivne Oblast, Ukraine

Berezne Березне
- City
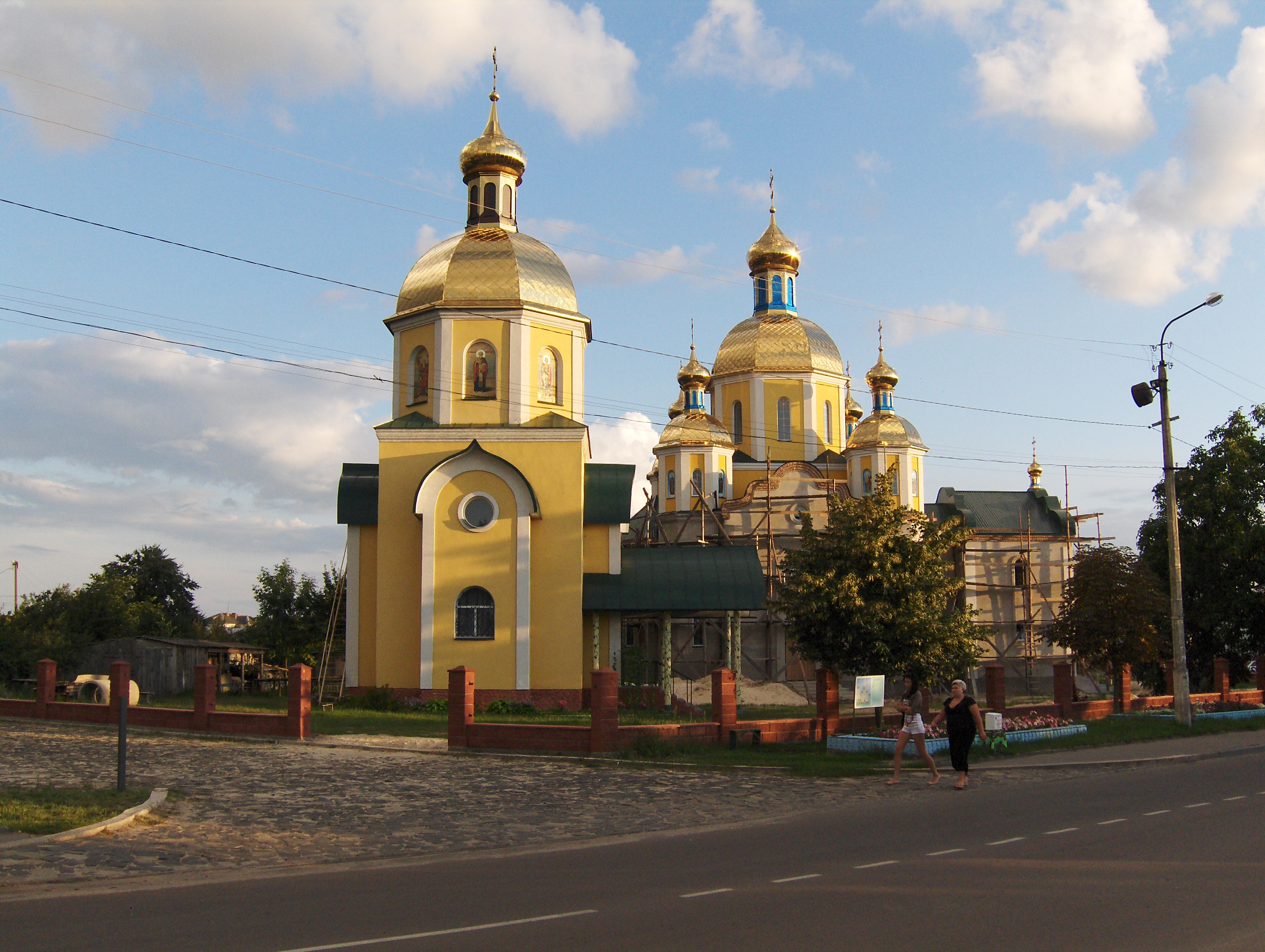
- Holy Trinity Church

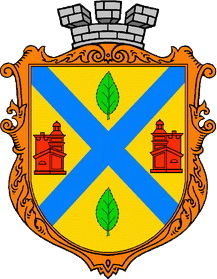
- Coat of arms

- Location within Ukraine Location within Rivne Oblast
- Coordinates: 50°59′48″N 26°44′22″E
- Country: Ukraine
- Oblast: Rivne Oblast
- Raion: Rivne Raion
- Hromada: Berezne urban hromada
- First mentioned: 1445
- Magdeburg law: 1584

Population (2022)
  - Total: 13,126

Berezne (Ukrainian: Березне, IPA: [beˈrɛzne]) is a city in Rivne Oblast, Ukraine. It is located on the Sluch River north of Rivne. It was the administrative center of Berezne Raion until it was merged with Rivne Raion in 2020. Population: 13,126 (2022 estimate).

== Overview ==
Berezne (historically known also as Bereźno as well as Polish: Jędrzejów, and Ukrainian: Андріїв) was established in 1446 within the Polish–Lithuanian Commonwealth. Since the Union of Lublin the town was part of the Kingdom of Poland, where it remained until the Partitions of Poland by Austria, Prussia and Russia. The town was overrun by Khmelnytsky in the Khmelnytsky Uprising of 1648 and experienced bloody pogroms which took many innocent lives. Annexed by the Russian Empire in 1793, Berezne was ceded to Poland in 1919–21 during the Peace of Riga. In the Second Polish Republic there was a garrison of the Border Protection Corps Bereźne Battalion in the town. Until the Soviet invasion of Poland in 1939, Bereźne belonged the Wołyń Voivodeship's County of Kostopol. According to the Polish census of 1931, the whole county had a population of 159,600 inhabitants, including 102,609 Ukrainians (overwhelmingly in villages: at 100,651), 34,450 Poles (32,189 in villages), and 10,786 Jews, along with significant numbers of Germans, Czechs, and Ruthenians.

=== Interwar period ===
In the Second Polish Republic during the interwar period, Bereźne bore the distinction of being one of the two cities in Poland with the most Jewish inhabitants in the country. Some 94.6 percent of Bereźne overall population of 2,494 inhabitants (or 2,360 persons), were Jewish. The second largest Jewish presence in Poland, amounting to 94.4 percent of the town's population, was in Liuboml.

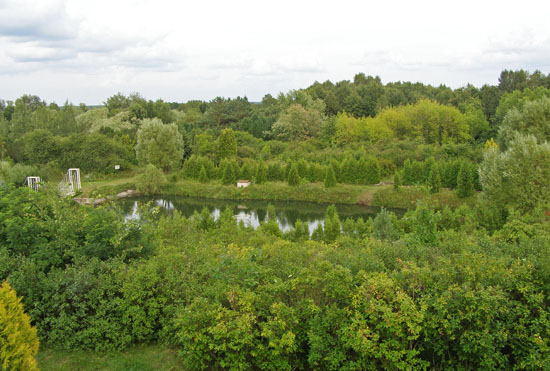
Berezne park

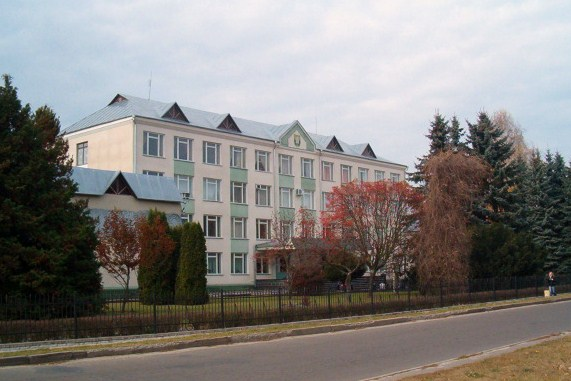
Berezne Forestry College

== World War II ==
Bereźne was overrun by the Soviets in 1939. In 1941 the German Wehrmacht entered the town as part of Operation Barbarossa. Immediately almost all Jewish homes were set on fire and the Jews were left with virtually no possessions. The Jews of Berezne, who then numbered approximately 3,000, were forced to live in three buildings surrounded by walls. This small area became known as the local ghetto. In the following year the Ukrainian Hilfsverwaltung together with the Germans, used Jews for slave labor, and hardly any food was supplied for them. The Jews forced to work in the forest were frequently tortured. Those who escaped related accounts of the slave labor and beatings. In August 1942 a detachment of SD entered the town. Immediately the Jews received even more severe beatings. Three days later all Jews that could be found were taken from the ghetto into the woods, where they were forced to dig a large pit. They were shot and buried at the same location. Many of the Jews that escaped into the woods were caught and delivered to the Germans by the local Ukrainians, who aided the SS in the process of "ethnic cleansing" known as the Holocaust by bullets.

In 1943, during the Volhynian Genocide, 96 ethnic Poles of Berezne were murdered by Ukrainian nationalists of the Ukrainian Insurgent Army. The first attack on the town took place in June 1943. Other attacks occurred in the second half of that year, and as a result Polish survivors fled to larger towns, such as Rowne. In June 1945 the remaining Poles were forced to leave Berezne in accordance with the Allied treaties.

After the breakup of the Soviet Union, culminating with Ukrainian independence, Berezne became the administrative centre of the Berezne Raion of western Ukraine.

=== The Holocaust survivors ===
Only a few hundred of the Jews of Berezne survived the Holocaust. Most of them escaped from the forest camp to the village of Mazorisz (Mazorish) where the Polish villagers that gave them food and shelter in return for firewood used for heating. Some left the area together with the Communists, before the Nazis entered. For many years there stood a monument memorializing the over 3,000 men, women, and children who were slaughtered by the Nazis and local Ukrainian collaborators, at the site of their mass grave. Corresponding to common Soviet practice, the Soviet authorities refused to mention on the monument that the 3,680 murdered victims were Jews, instead describing them as "citizens of the Soviet Union".
