= Holovyn =

Holovyn Головин
- Village
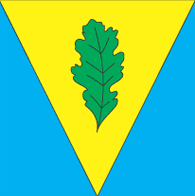
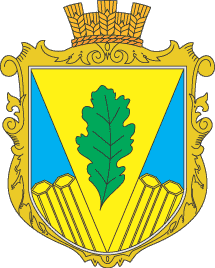
- Flag Coat of arms

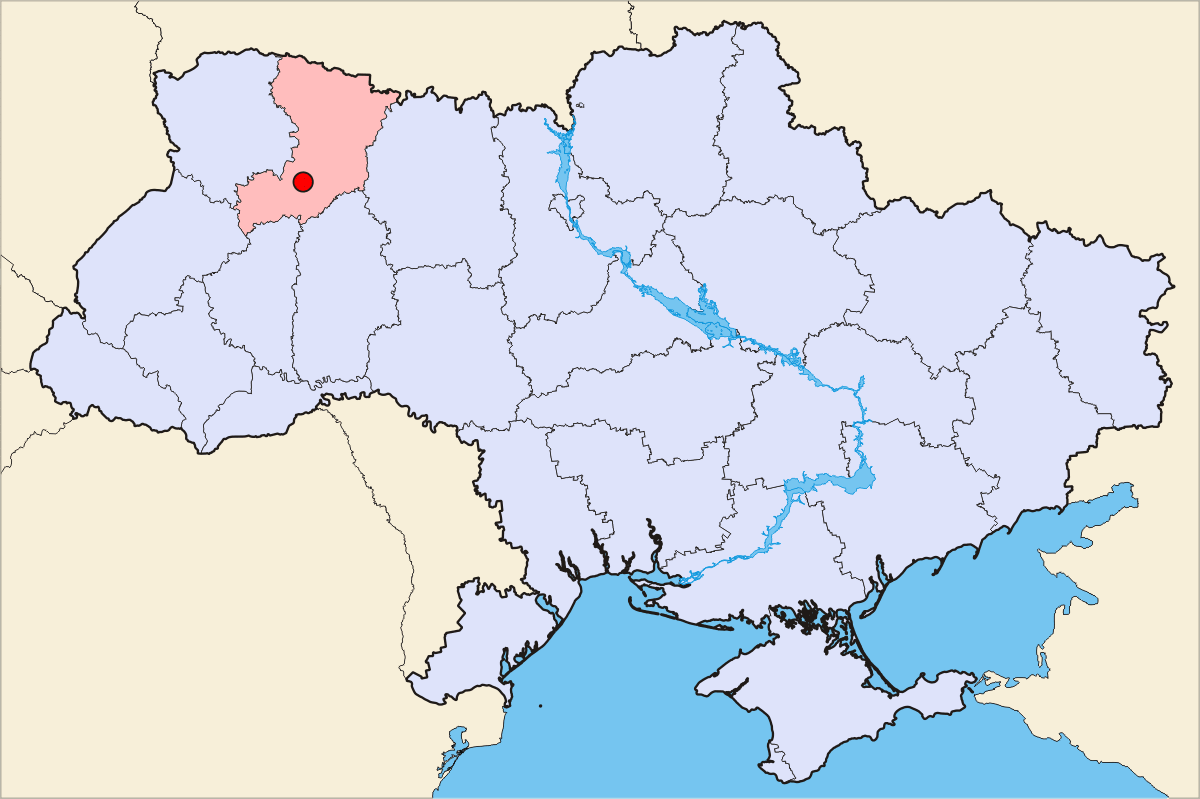
- Location within the Rivne Oblast
- Coordinates: 50°53′41″N 26°17′42″E
- Country: Ukraine
- Oblast: Rivne Oblast
- Raion: Rivne Raion
- Hromada: Holovyn rural hromada
- Founded: 1502

Area
  - Total: 2.19 km^{2} (0.85 sq mi)
- Elevation: 184 m (604 ft)

Population (2025)
  - Total: 871
  - Density: 458.45/km^{2} (1,187.4/sq mi)
- Time zone: UTC+2 (EET)
  - Summer (DST): UTC+3 (EEST)
- Postal code (Index): 35041
- Area code: +380 3657

Holovyn (Ukrainian: Головин) is a village in Rivne Raion, Rivne Oblast, Ukraine, but was formerly administered within Kostopil Raion. As of the year 2001, the community had 1004 residents. The postal code is 35041, and the KOATUU code is 5623480801.
