= Hrushvytsia Persha =

Hrushvytsia Persha Грушвиця Перша
- Village
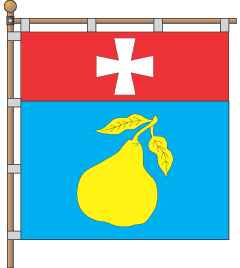
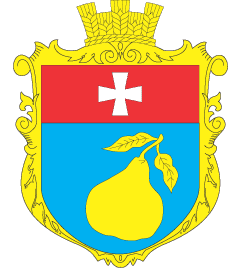
- Flag Coat of arms

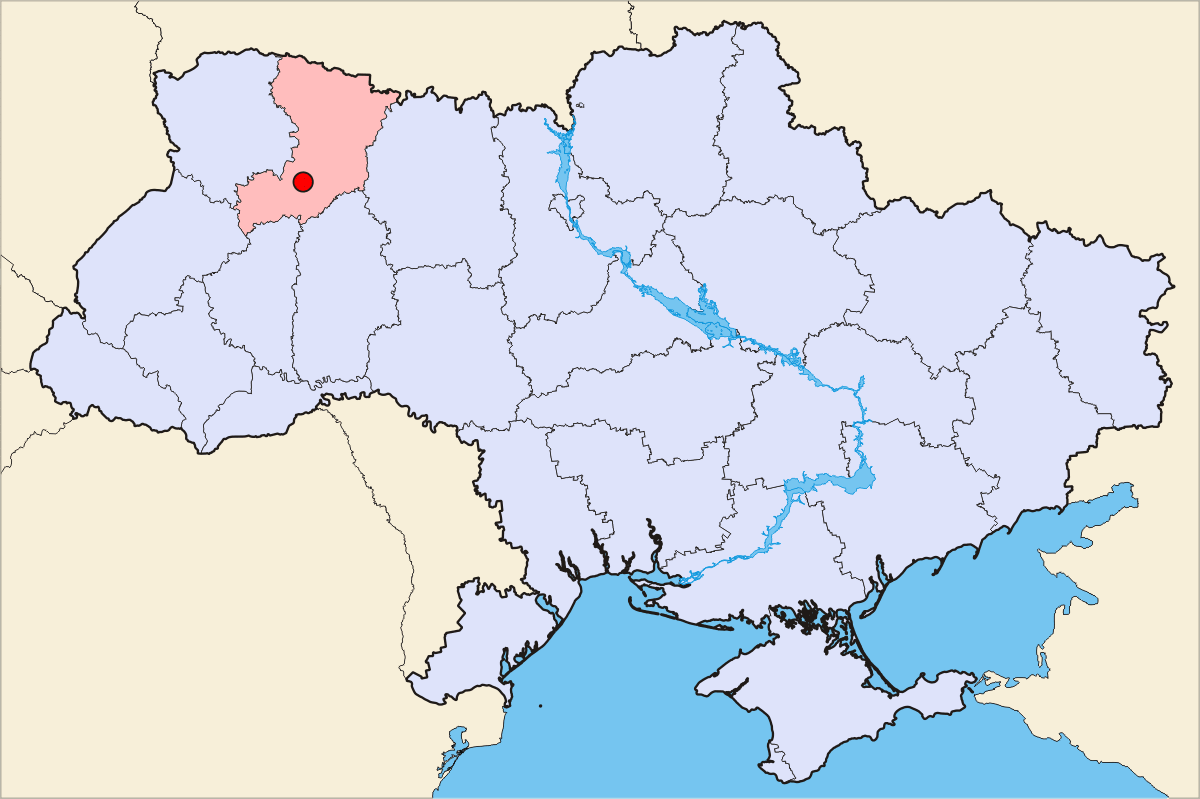
- Location within the Rivne Oblast
- Coordinates: 50°33′14″N 26°2′28″E
- Country: Ukraine
- Oblast: Rivne Oblast
- Raion: Rivne Raion
- Hromada: Velyka Omeliana rural hromada
- Founded: 1565

Area
  - Total: 254 km^{2} (98 sq mi)
- Elevation: 220 m (720 ft)

Population (2001)
  - Total: 940
  - Density: 37,008/km^{2} (95,850/sq mi)
- Time zone: UTC+2 (EET)
  - Summer (DST): UTC+3 (EEST)
- Postal code: 35364
- Area code: +380 362

Hrushvytsia Persha (Ukrainian: Грушвиця Перша) is a village in Rivne Raion, Rivne Oblast, Ukraine. As of the year 2001, the community had 940 residents.
