= Oleksandriia, Rivne Oblast =

Oleksandriia Олександрі́я
- Village
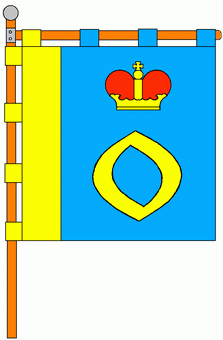
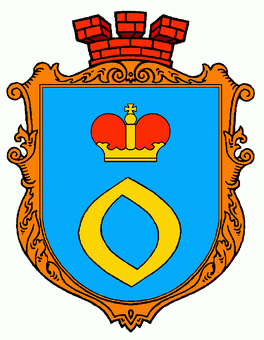
- Flag Coat of arms

- Location in Rivne Oblast Location in Ukraine
- Coordinates: 50°43′56″N 26°20′43″E
- Country: Ukraine
- Oblast: Rivne Oblast
- Raion: Rivne Raion
- Hromada: Oleksandriia rural hromada
- Founded: 1569

Area
  - Total: 1.45 km^{2} (0.56 sq mi)
- Elevation: 189 m (620 ft)

Population (2001)
  - Total: 2,397
  - Density: 1,653.1/km^{2} (4,282/sq mi)
- Time zone: UTC+2 (EET)
  - Summer (DST): UTC+3 (EEST)
- Postal code (Index): 35320
- Area code: +380 362

Oleksandríja, also Aleksandria (Ukrainian: Олександрі́я), is a village in Rivne Raion, Rivne Oblast, Ukraine. As of 2001, the community had 2397 residents. Postal code — 35320. KOATUU code — 5624680401.

== History ==
The Germans occupied the city during World War II from 1941 - 1944. A witness recounted of the Germans' occupation: "When they arrived, the German soldiers burned the synagogue near the river and set fire to the Jewish houses. They were terrible. The Jews tried to take the furniture from their houses so it wouldn’t burn."
