= Buhryn rural hromada =

Buhryn rural hromada Бугринська сільська громада
- Hromada
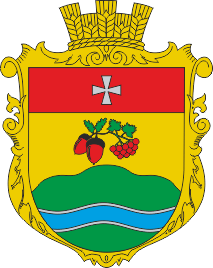
- Seal
- Interactive map of Buhryn rural hromada
- Country: Ukraine
- Oblast: Rivne Oblast
- Raion: Rivne Raion

Area
  - Total: 90 km^{2} (35 sq mi)

Population
  - Total: 4,118

Buhryn rural hromada is one of the hromadas of Rivne Raion in Rivne Oblast of Ukraine. Its administrative centre is the village of Buhryn. Bugrynska rural territorial hromada is located in the southeastern part of Rivne Raion.The hromada is located within the Volhynian Upland, in the basin of the Horyn River. The Bugrynska rural territorial hromada was formed in 2015.

== Composition ==
The hromada includes 12 villages: Bashyne, Buhryn (administrative centre), Kolesnyky, Myatyn, Novostavtsi, Oleksiivka, Posiahva, Serhiivka, Uhiltsi, Vilhir, Yasne, Zarichne.

== Geography ==
Bugrynska rural territorial hromada is located in the southeastern part of Rivne Raion. The administrative center of the hromada is the village of Bugryn. The area of the community is 90.18 km², the population is 4,270 inhabitants (2018).

The hromada is located within the Volhynian Upland. The relief is characterized by the presence of numerous ravines and wide beams with gentle slopes. Absolute elevations of the surface of the earth fluctuate within 214-247 m. Soddy-podzolic soils and peat bogs predominate on the territory of the Bugrynska territorial hromada.

The climate of the region is moderately continental: winter is mild (in January -4.4 °, -5.1 °), with unstable frosts; summer is warm (in July +18.8 °), not hot. Most often, comfortable weather is observed in the summer months. The formation of stable snow cover is noted in the second decade of December. Rainfall 550 mm per year. The territory of the hromada is located in the basin of the Horyn River (Pripyat basin), which flows along the eastern outskirts of the village of Bugryn.

The Bugrynska rural territorial hromada was formed on August 12, 2015 by merging the Bugrynska and Posyagvivska village councils of the Goshchansky district of the Rivne region.
