= Velykyi Zholudsk =

Velykyi Zholudsk Великий Жолудськ
- Village
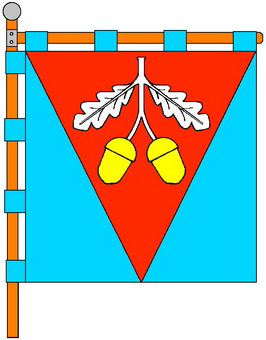
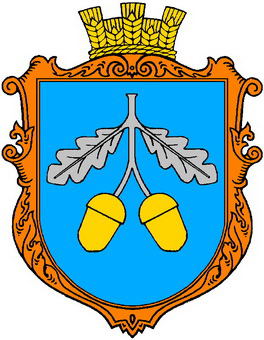
- Flag Coat of arms

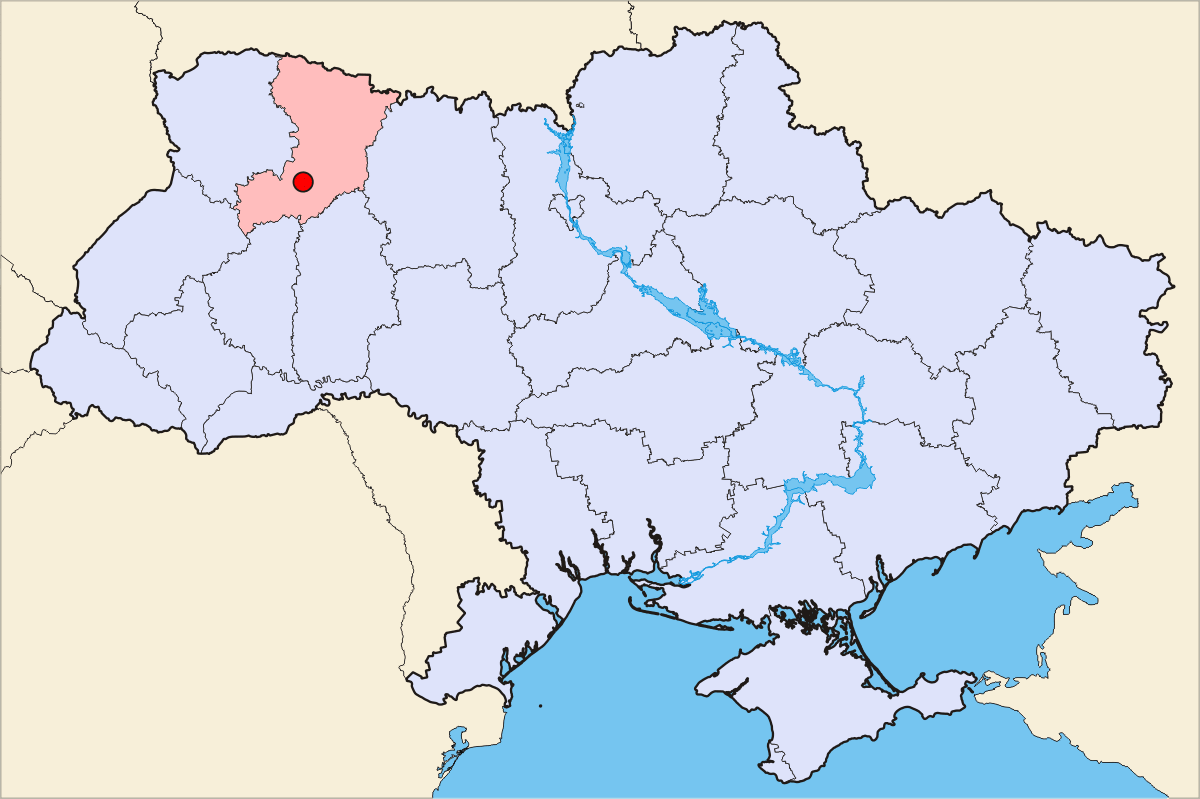
- Location within the Rivne Oblast
- Coordinates: 51°19′09″N 26°06′24″E
- Country: Ukraine
- Oblast: Rivne Oblast
- Raion: Volodymyrets Raion
- Silska Rada: Velykyi Zholudsk Silska Rada
- Founded: 1510

Area
  - Total: 2.598 km^{2} (1.003 sq mi)
- Elevation: 156 m (512 ft)

Population (2001)
  - Total: 796
  - Density: 306/km^{2} (790/sq mi)
- Time zone: UTC+2 (EET)
  - Summer (DST): UTC+3 (EEST)
- Postal code: 34364
- Area code: +380 3634

Velykyi Zholudsk (Ukrainian: Великий Жолудськ) is a village in Varash Raion, Rivne Oblast, Ukraine, but was formerly administered within Volodymyrets Raion. As of the year 2001, the community had 796 residents. Postal code — 34364. KOATUU code — 5620881501.
