= Zelenyi Hai, Rivne Oblast =

Ukrainian village

Coordinates: 50°29′43″N 26°0′0″E

Zelenyi Hai (Ukrainian: Зелений Гай) is a village in Dubno Raion, Lviv Oblast, Ukraine.
