= Yasynets =

Yasynets Ясинець
- Village
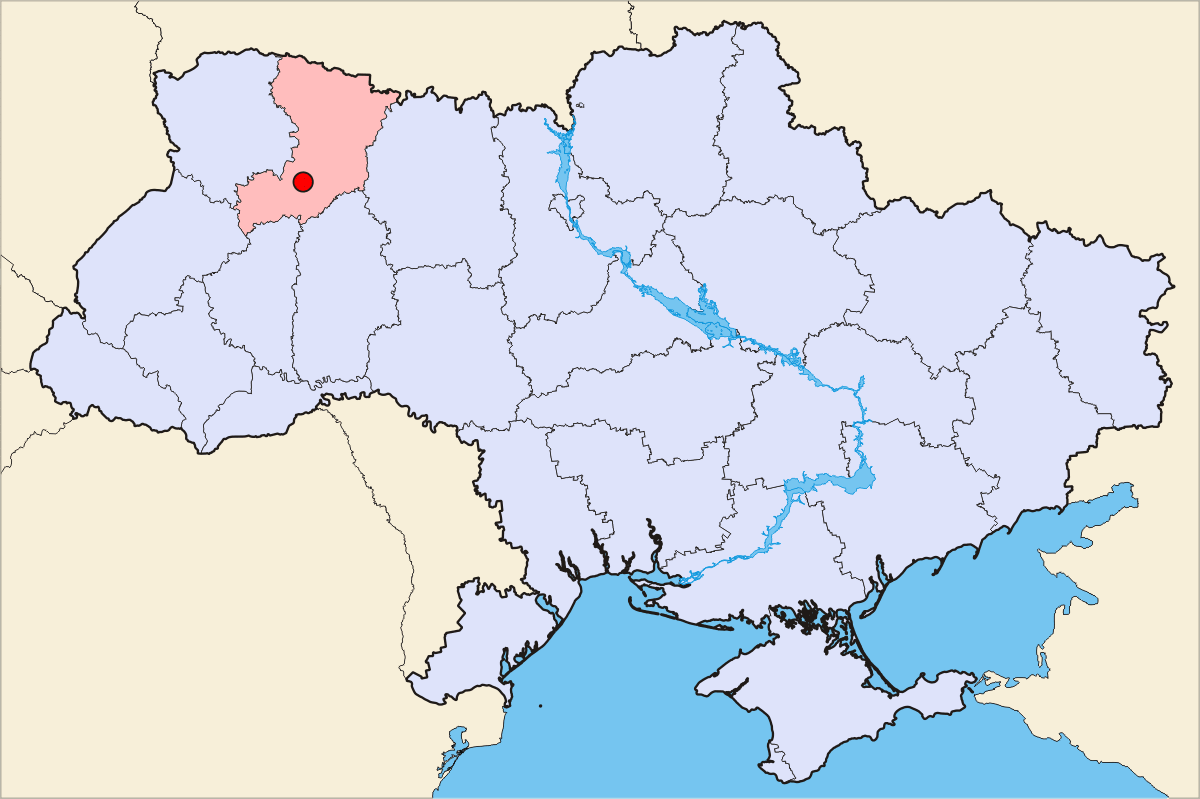
- Location within the Rivne Oblast
- Coordinates: 51°38′18″N 26°34′59″E
- Country: Ukraine
- Oblast: Rivne Oblast
- Raion: Sarny Raion
- Silska Rada: Selets Silska Rada
- Founded: 1610

Area
  - Total: 069 km^{2} (27 sq mi)
- Elevation: 141 m (463 ft)

Population (2001)
  - Total: 544
  - Density: 78,841/km^{2} (204,200/sq mi)
- Time zone: UTC+2 (EET)
  - Summer (DST): UTC+3 (EEST)
- Postal index: 34142
- Area code: +380 3658

Yasynets (Ukrainian: Ясинець) is a village in western Ukraine, in the Sarny Raion of Rivne Oblast, but was formerly administered within Dubrovytsia Raion. Its population is 544 people, it was founded 1610, and has an area of 0.69 km^{2}.
