= Berezhnytsia =

Berezhnytsia Бережниця
- Village
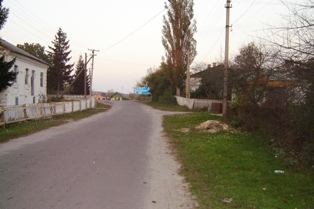

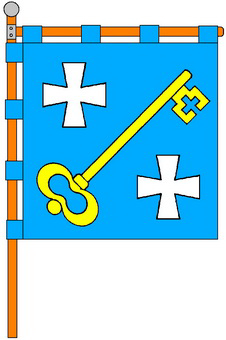
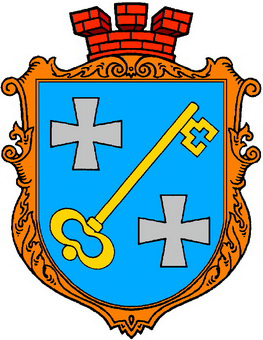
- Flag Coat of arms

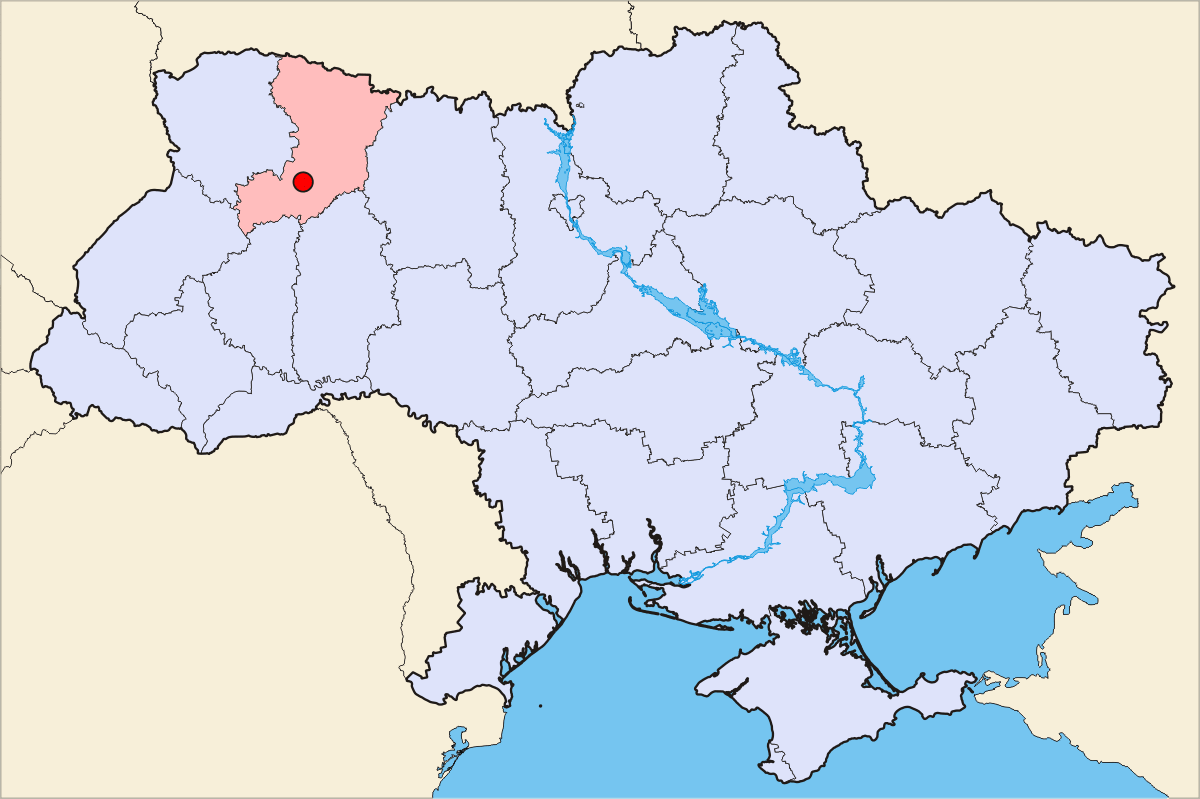
- Location within the Rivne Oblast
- Coordinates: 51°26′23″N 26°28′20″E
- Country: Ukraine
- Oblast: Rivne Oblast
- Raion: Sarny Raion
- Silska Rada: Berezhnytsia Silska Rada
- Founded: 1629

Area
  - Total: 1.5 km^{2} (0.58 sq mi)
- Elevation: 158 m (518 ft)

Population (2001)
  - Total: 646
  - Density: 872.97/km^{2} (2,261.0/sq mi)
- Demonym: Berezhnytsian
- Time zone: UTC+2 (EET)
  - Summer (DST): UTC+3 (EEST)
- Postal code (Index): 34164
- Area code: +380 3658

Berezhnytsia (Ukrainian: Бережниця) is a village in Sarny Raion, Rivne Oblast, Ukraine, but was formerly administered within Dubrovytsia Raion. As of the year 2001, the community had 646 residents. The postal code for the village is 34164, and the KOATUU code is 5621882001.
