= Solomyr =

Solomyr Соломир
- Village
- Location of Solomyr within Rivne Oblast and Ukraine Solomyr (Ukraine)
- Coordinates: 51°51′37″N 26°15′07″E
- Country: Ukraine
- Oblast: Rivne Oblast
- Raion: Varash Raion

Area
  - Total: 14.685 km^{2} (5.670 sq mi)
- Elevation: 140 m (460 ft)

Population
  - Total: 546

Solomyr (Ukrainian: Соломир) is a village in Varash Raion, Rivne Oblast, Ukraine.

== Geography ==
The village is located near the Belarus–Ukraine border. Solomyr Lake is located in the village. It has an elevation of 140 metres (460 ft).

Prior to July 2020, Solomyr was located in Zarichne Raion but after the 2020 raion reform in Ukraine, Zarichne Raion was merged with Varash Raion and the village was also transferred to Zarichne Raion.

== Population ==
In 2001, the population was 273 people. It thereafter increased with people moving from smaller villages and from Belarus (Brest Oblast).

== Language ==
Distribution of population by mother tongue (2001 census)
Language	Percentage of Population
Ukrainian	96,76%
Belarusian	2,88%
Russian	0,36
