= Oparypsy =

Oparypsy Опарипси
- Village
- Location within Rivne Oblast Location within Ukraine
- Coordinates: 50.135556°N 25.233056°E
- Country: Ukraine
- Oblast: Rivne Oblast
- District: Dubno Raion

Oparypsy (In Ukrainian: Опарипси or Опаріпси, Polish: Oparypsy) is a village in the Dubno Raion, Rivne Oblast, Ukraine, but was formerly administered within Radyvyliv Raion. For the first time mentioned in connection with the construction of Lutsk Castle, 1545. It lies less than 1 kilometre (1 mi) east of Radyvyliv.

Located near the Slonovka river. One of only two Ukrainian Tesla Superchargers is planned to be opened in the village.

== History ==
The village's origins were as a Ruthenian settlement within the Grand Duchy of Lithuania. Following the 1569 Union of Lublin, it became part of the Lithuanian-Polish commonwealth. As a result of the Partitions of the Polish Lithuanian Commonwealth, Oparypsy was occupied by the Russian Empire. After World War I it became part of the Second Republic of Poland. After the Soviet invasion of Poland, it was subsumed into the Soviet Union.

== Demography ==
According to the 2001 census, nearly all people living in the village speak Ukrainian language. Also according to the 2001 census, there were a total of 799 people living in the village.

== Gallery ==
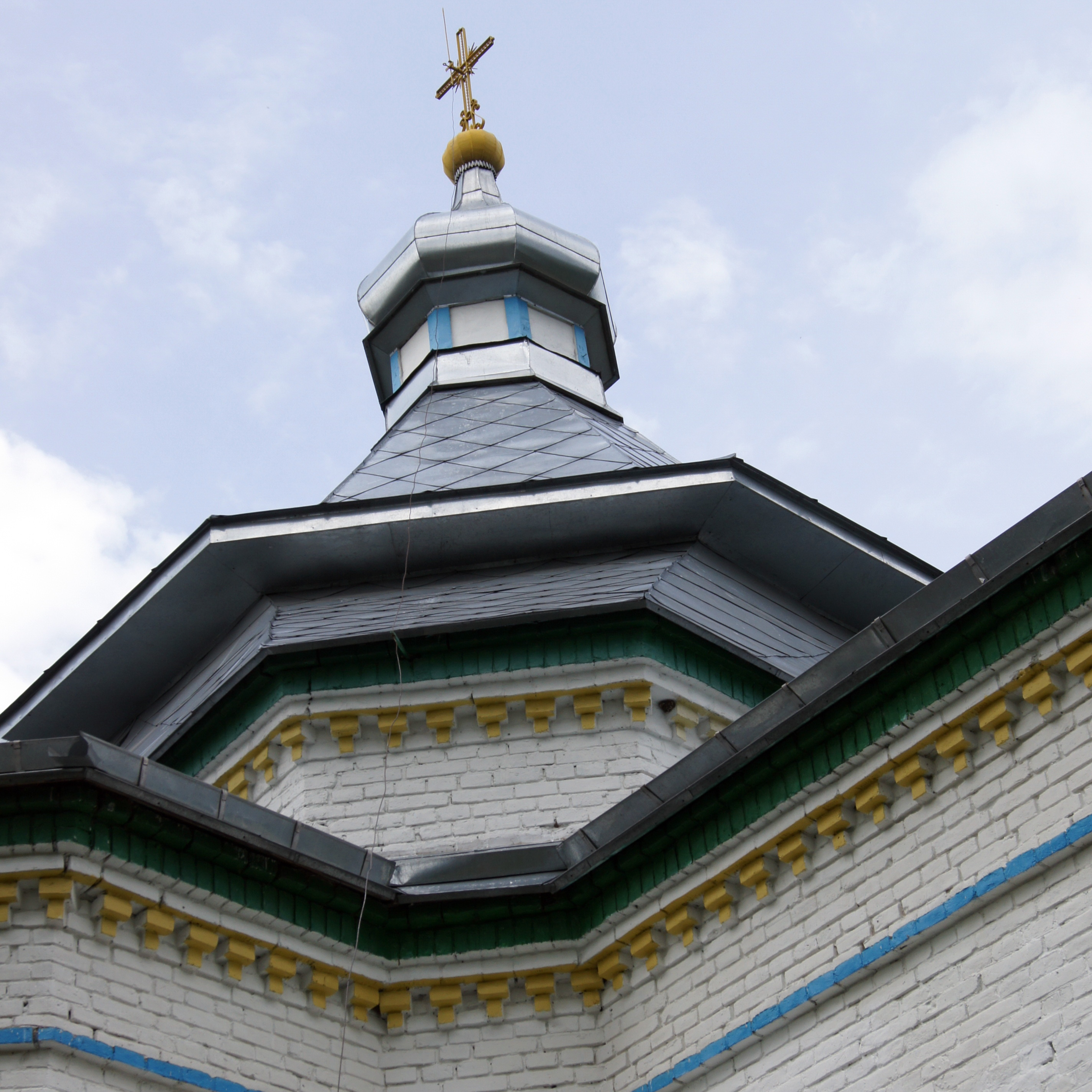
Oparypsy Church, 1939

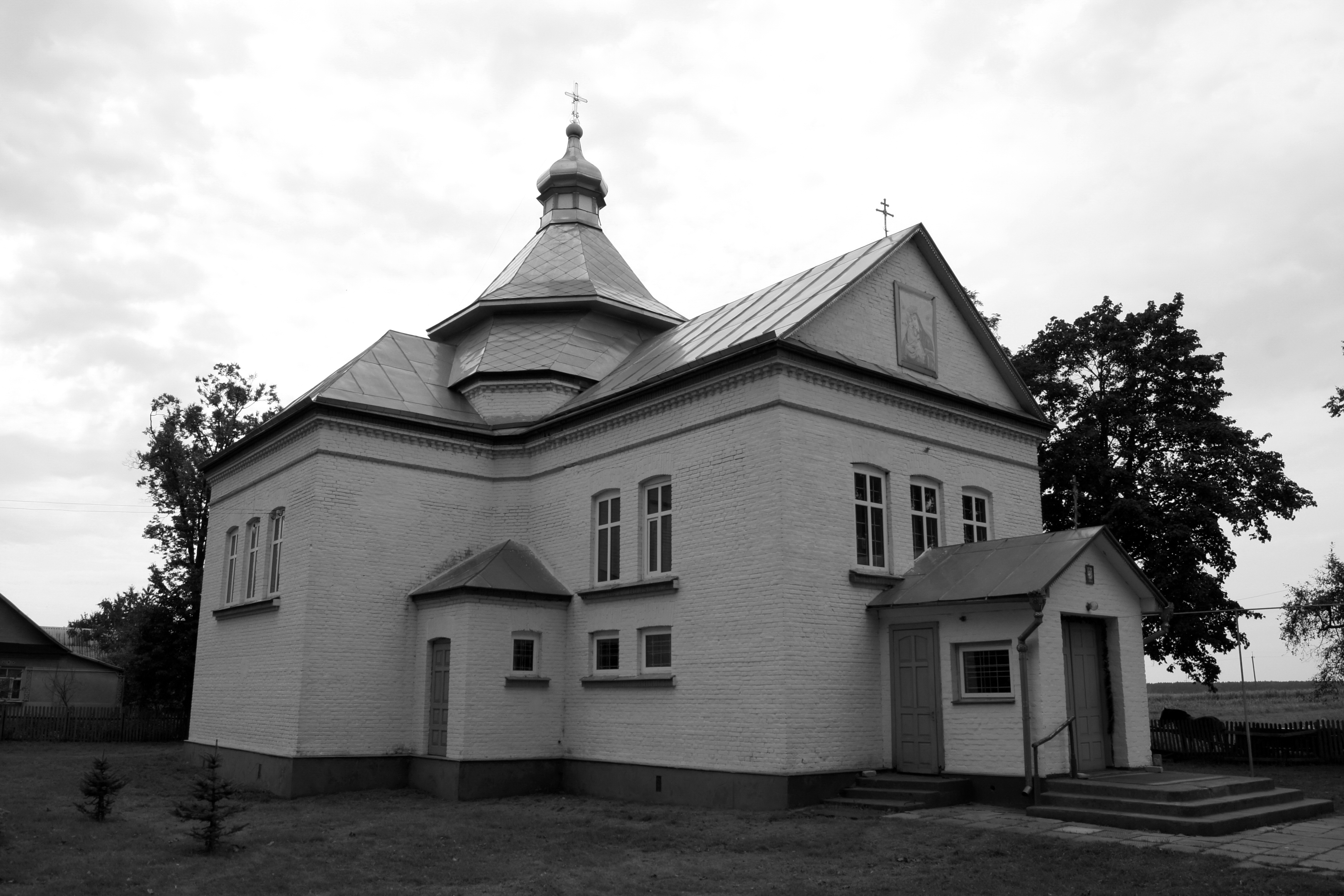
Oparypsy Church
