= Bortnytsia =

- Village
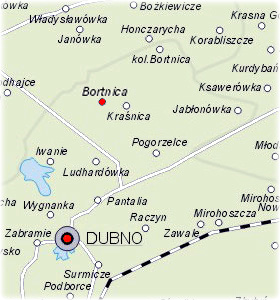
- Bortnytsia (Bortnica) on the map of Soviet occupied Second Polish Republic (now Ukraine) before the massacres of Poles between 1942-1945
- Coordinates: 50°30′N 25°53′E
- Country: Ukraine
- Oblast: Rivne Oblast
- Raion: Dubno Raion

Bortnytsia (Ukrainian: Бортниця, Polish: Bortnica) is a village in Rivne oblast, near the town of Dubno, in Dubno Raion, Ukraine. The village currently has a population of 365.

== History ==
Before the Nazi German and Soviet invasions of Poland the village was located in the Wołyń Voivodeship of the Second Polish Republic. It was made up of 61 farms of different sizes.

=== World War II history ===
In World War II, following the Soviet invasion of Poland, dozens of ethnic Polish families were sent to Siberia by the NKVD in 1940. Bortnica was one of many sites of the massacres of Poles and Jews committed between 1942 and 1945 by the death squads of OUN-UPA and the local Ukrainian peasants. The village was raided repeatedly in a process of ethnic cleansing. Farms were burned mostly at night. Jews kept a 24-hour vigil, because, unlike the Polish families who in the worst-case scenario could flee into the German–occupied cities, Jewish families had nowhere to run. Pitched battles with Ukrainian Insurgent Army were breaking out all the time. The bloodiest fighting broke out in Bortnica on Christmas Eve in 1943, six weeks before the arrival of the Red Army. Fifteen Poles and eight Jews defending themselves against the invading force of 400 Ukrainian nationalists. Devoid of ammunition, the defenders fell back a day later. Half were killed in battle. A few escaped into the forest. In the Dubno County, the Polish self-defence against ethnic cleansing by OUN-UPA was more successful only in Pańska Dolina.
