= Verba, Rivne Oblast =

Verba Верба
- Village
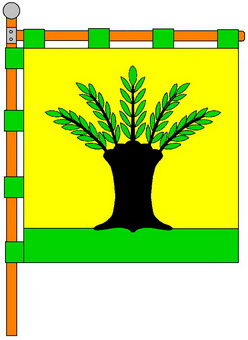
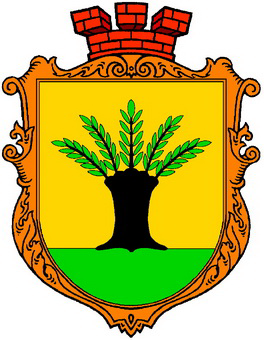
- Flag Coat of arms

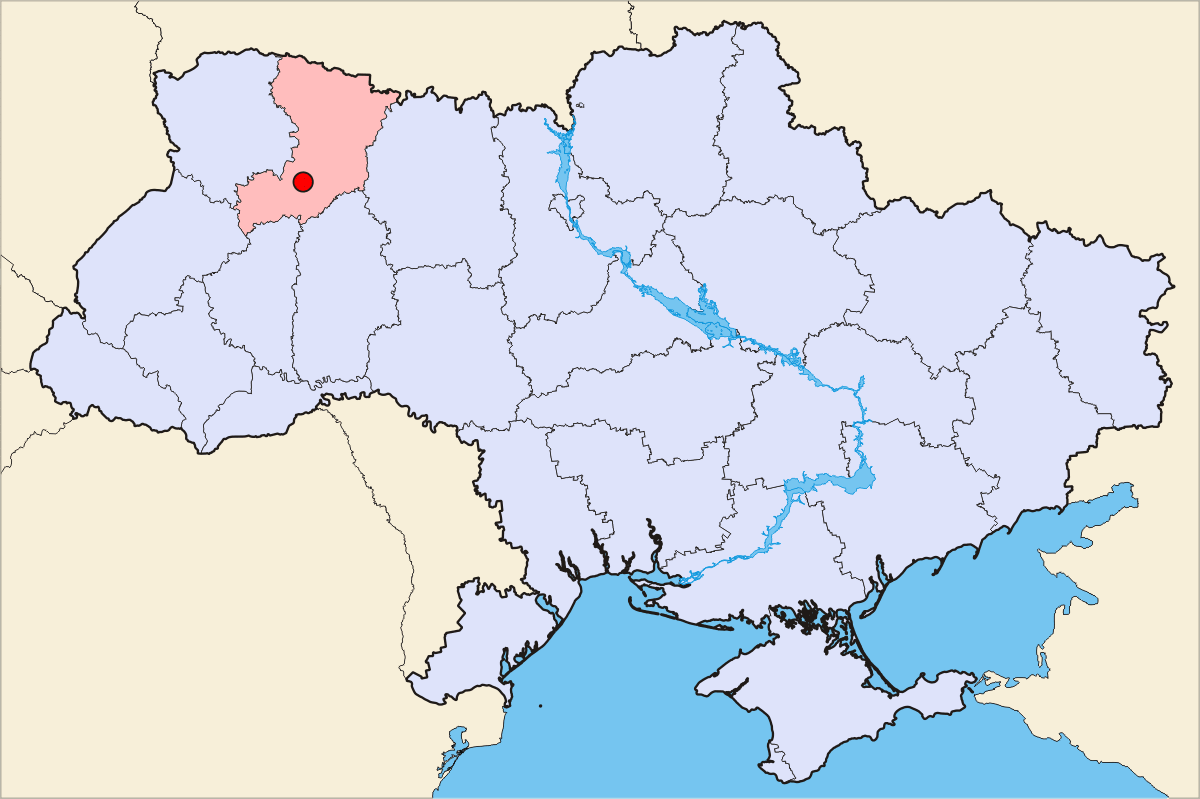
- Location within the Rivne Oblast
- Coordinates: 50°16′24″N 25°36′34″E
- Country: Ukraine
- Oblast: Rivne Oblast
- Raion: Dubno Raion
- Hromada: Verba rural hromada
- Founded: 15th century

Area
  - Total: 4.73 km^{2} (1.83 sq mi)
- Elevation: 211 m (692 ft)

Population (2001)
  - Total: 2,863
  - Density: 605/km^{2} (1,570/sq mi)
- Time zone: UTC+2 (EET)
  - Summer (DST): UTC+3 (EEST)
- Postal code (Index): 35670
- Area code: +380 3656

Verba (Ukrainian: Верба; Polish: Werba) is a village in Dubno Raion, Rivne Oblast, Ukraine. In 2001, the community had 2,863 residents. It is located on the Ikva river in the historical region of Western Volhynia.

== History ==
The first written records noting this area is contained in Privilege of King Casimir IV Jagiellon issued to Denisko Mukosiyovich, who was granted Zbarazh and villages of Zbarazh volost for life as an award "for safe service", given by designation of noble council from January 12, 1442, in which the village is noted among others.

In 1518, the village was elevated by decree to city status by King Sigismund I the Old.

In 1545, the village was mentioned in the review of Kremenets castle, noting that the proprietors of the villages of Bereh and Verba retained one of the fortifications. The proprietor of Verba was Andrzej Kuniowski.

In 1549, the village was purchased by Mykhailo Dashkovich Elovich-Malinsky. In 1564, he won a local privilege on the foundation of the township and the right to arrange weekly auctions and a semi-annual fair. In the western part of Verba, where the roads to Kremenets, Dubno, Kozyn, and Brody intersected, he erected a town hall/house of arrivals. A township was surrounded by an earthen billow. Part of Verba outside the billow remains in a portion of the village. Part of the village, which had a status of township remains its center.

In 1774, the village population was 1,282.

After the division of Poland in 1793, the territory that includes Verba was ruled by the Russian Empire. The township was the center of a volost in Dubno Uyezd of the Volhynian Governorate. According to the "List of all postal stations in Volhynian Governorate”, Verba had a church. It was related that a postal/passenger highway passed through. A post-house stabled 34 horses.

According to the Brockhaus and Efron Encyclopedic Dictionary (published in Imperial Russia, 1890–1907) 124 gardens were counted in the township Verba. With a population of 1068, it hosted a railhead, 9 shops, 8 coaching inns, a Russian Orthodox church, and a synagogue.

Between 1943 and 1946 Verba was a centre of resistance fight led by the Ukrainian Insurgent Army against Nazi Germany and Soviet Union. After World War II it served as a district centre of Rivne Oblast.
