= Rizky =

Rizky is a given name and a surname. Notable people with the name include:

- Suci Rizky Andini (born 1993), Indonesian badminton player
- Rizky Darmawan (born 1994), Indonesian professional footballer
- Rizky Febian (born 1998), Indonesian singer, songwriter, actor and TV presenter
- Rizky Dwi Febrianto (born 1997), Indonesian professional footballer
- Rizky Ramdani Lestaluhu (born 1991), Indonesian professional footballer
- Rizky Yusuf Nasution (born 1997), Indonesian professional footballer
- Rizky Pellu (born 1992), Indonesian professional footballer
- Rizky Pora (born 1989), Indonesian professional footballer
- Rizky Eka Pratama (born 1999), Indonesian professional footballer
- Rizky Ramadhana (born 1992), Indonesian professional footballer
- Rizky Ridho (born 2001), Indonesian professional footballer
- Defri Rizky (born 1988), Indonesian professional footballer
- Ega Rizky (born 1992), Indonesian professional footballer
