= Ozerko =

Langa Озерко
- Village
- Location within Vologda Oblast Location within Russia
- Coordinates: 59°28′N 39°59′E
- Country: Russia
- Region: Vologda Oblast
- District: Sokolsky District
- Time zone: UTC+3:00

Ozerko (Russian: Озерко) is a rural locality (a village) in Borovetskoye Rural Settlement, Sokolsky District, Vologda Oblast, Russia. The population was 23 as of 2002.

== Geography ==
The distance to Sokol is 12 km, to Obrosovo is 1 km. Bolshoy Dvor is the nearest rural locality.
