= Netreba =

Coordinates: 51°06′N 27°20′E

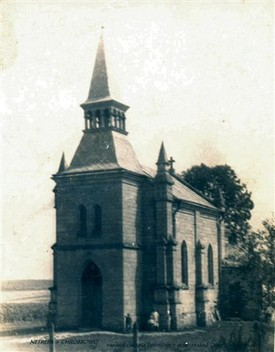
Church in Netreba demolished by the Soviets

Netreba is a village in Sarny Raion, Rivne Oblast, Ukraine, with a current population of 586 people. Before WWII, the rural village of Netreba located in the eastern Wolyn Voivodeship of the Second Polish Republic and was mostly inhabited by Polish Catholic farmers. In 1939, Volhynia was occupied by the Soviet Red Army during the invasion of Poland and annexed to the Ukrainian SSR of the Soviet Union, and was later occupied by the German Army in early July 1941, during the German invasion of the Soviet Union. Due to the village having a Polish Catholic population, the village and it is population were destroyed and massacred by the UPA in July 1943, during the massacres of Poles in Volhynia and Eastern Galicia. The village was destroyed and burned down almost completely. Polish survivors of the massacre hid in the forest and built a dugout where they ultimately survived until the Soviet Red Army liberated Volhynia in January 1944.

The solitary church still standing at the end of the war, was dismantled soon after by the Soviet authorities and the materials used in the construction of pig-stalls in nearby kolhozs (government-run farms). Volhynia was again annexed to the Soviet Union by the end of World War II in 1945, and as a result, even though the village was rebuilt, the Polish population of Volhynia (and other areas outside of Poland) were forced by Soviet authorities to leave the Soviet Union and settle in Poland, at the Recovered Lands, so the village was inhabited by Ukrainians instead.

The village and surrounding area became part of Ukraine, after it got independence from the Soviet Union in 1991.

In 2001, the village had a population of 575 people, and currently the number of people rose to 586 people.

- Geographical coordinates: 51° 6' 0" North, 27° 20' 0" East
