= Ostroh Raion =

Former subdivision of Rivne Oblast, Ukraine

Ostroh Raion Острозький район
- Raion
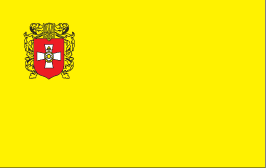
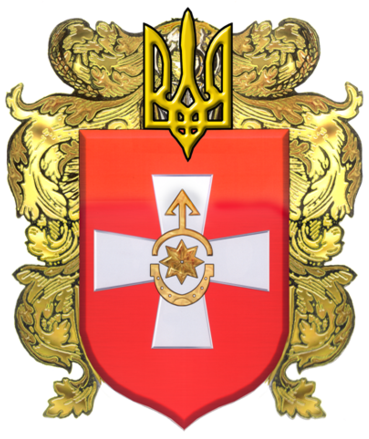
- Flag Coat of arms

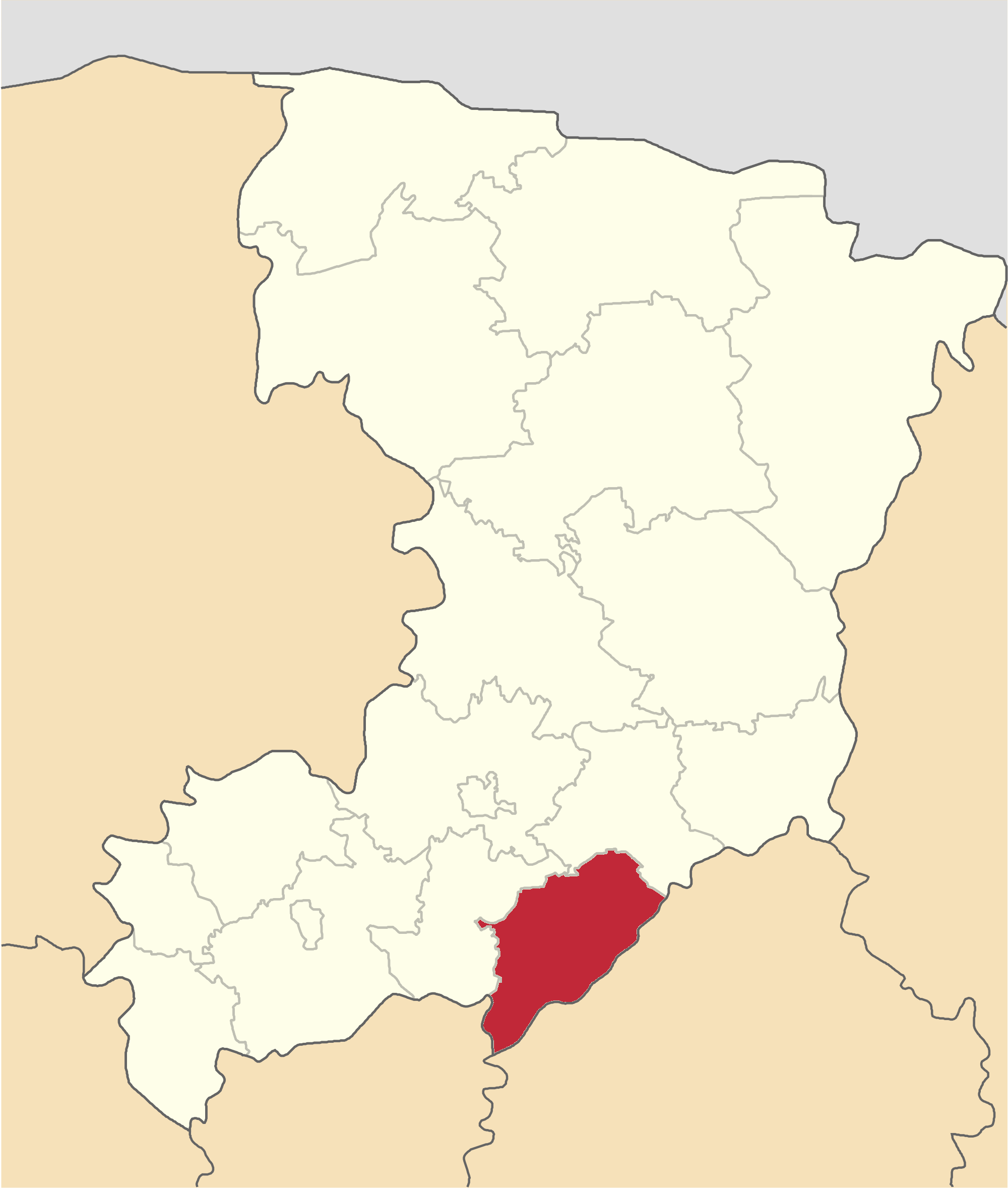
- Coordinates: 50°22′19″N 26°27′20″E
- Country: Ukraine
- Oblast: Rivne Oblast
- Established: 1940
- Disestablished: 18 July 2020
- Admin. center: Ostroh
- Subdivisions: List: — city councils; — settlement councils; — rural councils; Number of localities: — cities; — urban-type settlements; 55 — villages; — rural settlements

Area
  - Total: 693 km^{2} (268 sq mi)

Population (2020)
  - Total: 27,744
  - Density: 40.0/km^{2} (104/sq mi)
- Time zone: UTC+02:00 (EET)
  - Summer (DST): UTC+03:00 (EEST)
- Area code: +380
- Website: http://www.rv.gov.ua/sitenew/ostrozk Ostroh Raion

Ostroh Raion (Ukrainian: Острозький район) was a raion in Rivne Oblast in western Ukraine. Its administrative center was the city of Ostroh which was administratively incorporated as a city of oblast significance and did not belong to the raion. The raion was abolished and its territory was merged into Rivne Raion on 18 July 2020 as part of the administrative reform of Ukraine, which reduced the number of raions of Rivne Oblast to four. The last estimate of the raion population was 27,744 (2020 est.)

== See also ==
- Subdivisions of Ukraine
