= Yasynivka, Rivne Oblast =

Yasynivka Ясинівка
- Village
- Location within the Ukraine Yasynivka (Rivne Oblast)
- Coordinates: 50°21′26″N 25°55′28″E
- Country: Ukraine
- Oblast: Rivne Oblast
- Raion: Dubno Raion
- Hromada: Semyduby rural hromada

Area
  - Total: 2.11 km^{2} (0.81 sq mi)
- Elevation: 298 m (978 ft)

Population (2001)
  - Total: 28
- Time zone: UTC+2 (EET)
  - Summer (DST): UTC+3 (EEST)
- Postal code (Index): 35660
- Area code: +380 3656

Yasynivka (Ukrainian: Ясинівка), also spelled Yasenivka (Ukrainian: Ясенівка), is a village in Dubno Raion, Rivne Oblast, Ukraine. If forms part of Semyduby rural hromada, one of the hromadas of Ukraine. In 2001, the village had 28 residents.

== History ==
In 1906, Yasynivka was a colony of the Sudobitsky volost, Dubensky district, Volyn province. The distance from the county town is 20 versts, and from the parish 20. It had 24 yards and inhabitants 155. .
