= Kostopil Raion =

Former subdivision of Rivne Oblast, Ukraine

Kostopil Raion Костопільський район
- Raion
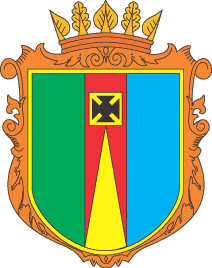
- Flag Coat of arms

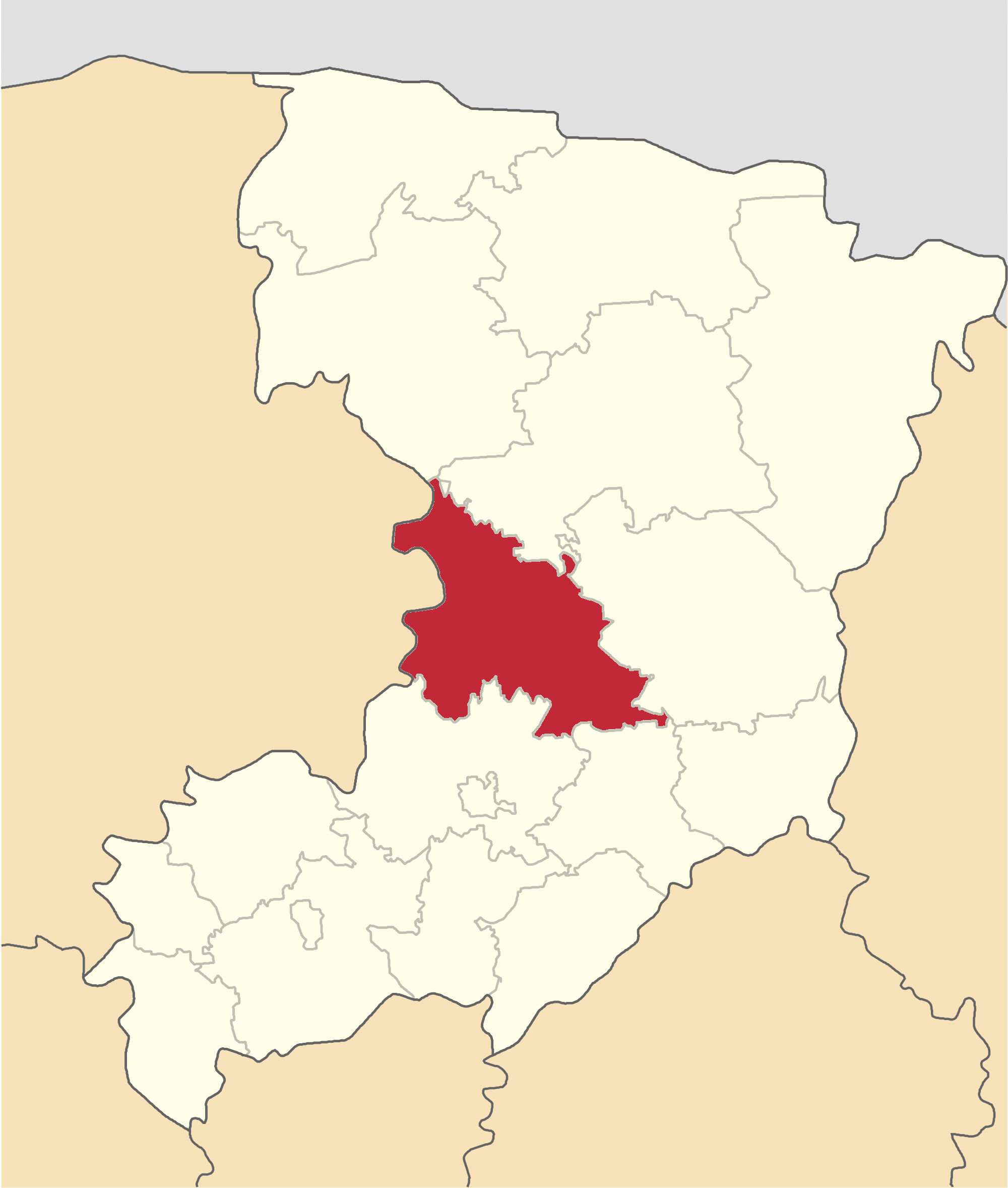
- Coordinates: 50°55′50″N 26°18′52″E
- Country: Ukraine
- Oblast: Rivne Oblast
- Established: 1939
- Disestablished: 18 July 2020
- Admin. center: Kostopil
- Subdivisions: List: — city councils; — settlement councils; — rural councils; Number of localities: — cities; — urban-type settlements; 61 — villages; — rural settlements

Area
  - Total: 1,496 km^{2} (578 sq mi)

Population (2020)
  - Total: 63,462
  - Density: 42.42/km^{2} (109.9/sq mi)
- Time zone: UTC+02:00 (EET)
  - Summer (DST): UTC+03:00 (EEST)
- Area code: +380
- Website: http://www.rv.gov.ua/sitenew/kostopilsk Kostopil Raion

Kostopil Raion (Ukrainian: Костопільський район) was a raion in Rivne Oblast in western Ukraine. Its administrative center was the town of Kostopil. The raion was abolished and its territory was merged into Rivne Raion on 18 July 2020 as part of the administrative reform of Ukraine, which reduced the number of raions of Rivne Oblast to four. The last estimate of the raion population was 63,462 (2020 est.)

== See also ==
- Subdivisions of Ukraine
