= Rivne Raion =

Subdivision of Rivne Oblast, Ukraine

Rivne Raion Рівненський район
- Raion
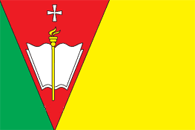
- Flag Coat of arms

- Coordinates: 50°40′35.5″N 26°9′36″E
- Country: Ukraine
- Oblast: Rivne Oblast
- Established: 1962
- Admin. center: Rivne
- Subdivisions: 26 hromadas

Area
  - Total: 7,218 km^{2} (2,787 sq mi)

Population (2022)
  - Total: 625,543
  - Density: 86.66/km^{2} (224.5/sq mi)
- Time zone: UTC+02:00 (EET)
  - Summer (DST): UTC+03:00 (EEST)
- Area code: 380-3264
- Website: http://www.rv.gov.ua/sitenew/rivnensk Rivne Raion

Rivne Raion (Ukrainian: Рівненський район) is a raion in Rivne Oblast in western Ukraine. Its administrative center is the city of Rivne. Population: 625,543 (2022 estimate).

On 18 July 2020, as part of the administrative reform of Ukraine, the number of raions of Rivne Oblast was reduced to four, and the area of Rivne Raion was significantly expanded. The January 2020 estimate of the raion population was 92,981 (2020 est.).

== Communities of the district ==
Number of settlements 439. Number of cities – 6. The district includes 26 territorial communities. The district includes: Rivne, Ostroh, Berezne, Zdolbuniv, Korets, Kostopil urban communities, Sosnove, Hoshcha, Mizoch, Klevan settlement communities, Malynsk, Babyn, Buhryn, Zdovbytsia, Velyki Mezhyrichi, Holovyn, Derazhne, Mala Liubasha, Bila Krynytsia, Velyka Omeliana, Horodok, Dyadkovychi, Zoria, Kornyn, Oleksandriya, Shpaniv rural territorial communities.

== Geography ==
The area of the district is 3294.1 km^{2}.

The district borders the Sarny, Varash and Dubno districts of the Rivne Oblast, as well as the Khmelnytskyi Oblast, Zhytomyr Oblast, Ternopil Oblast, Volyn region of Ukraine.

The relief of the district is flat, partly lowland, covered with pine and oak forests. Varash Raion has reserves of basalt, chalk, clay.

The larger area of the district is located in the Volhynian Upland, in the north - on the Polesian Lowland. On the territory of the district is the Mizotsky ridge, 342 m high, the highest part of the Volyn Upland. Rivne district is located in the basin of the Pripyat River, its right tributary, the Horyn, flows through the district. The climate of the region is moderately continental: winter is mild (in January -4.4 °, -5.1 °), with unstable frosts; summer is warm (in July +18.8 °), not hot. Most often, comfortable weather is observed in the summer months. The formation of stable snow cover is noted in the second decade of December. Rainfall 550 mm per year.

The Derman-Ostroh National Nature Park are located on the territory of the Rivne district.

== Transport ==
Highways pass through the district: European route E40, national highway H22 , which allow you to reach Kyiv, Lviv, and Poland. The city of Zdolbuniv, Rivne district, is an important railway junction in Western Ukraine. Railways through the district run to Kovel, Lviv and Kyiv. The Gdansk-Odesa Organisation for Co‑operation between Railways corridor passes through Zdolbuniv.

== See also ==
- Subdivisions of Ukraine

== Bibliography ==
- Національний атлас України/НАН України, Інститут географії, Державна служба геодезії, картографії та кадастру; голов. ред. Л. Г. Руденко; голова ред. кол.Б.Є. Патон. — К.: ДНВП «Картографія», 2007. — 435 с. — 5 тис.прим. — ISBN 978-966-475-067-4.
- Коротун І.М., Коротун Л.К. Географія Рівненської області. – Рівне, 1996. – 274 с
- Географічна енциклопедія України : [у 3 т.] / редкол.: О. М. Маринич (відповід. ред.) та ін. — К., 1989—1993. — 33 000 екз. — ISBN 5-88500-015-8.
