= Administrative divisions of Rivne Oblast =

Rivne Oblast is subdivided into districts (raions) which are subdivided into territorial communities (hromadas).

== Current ==
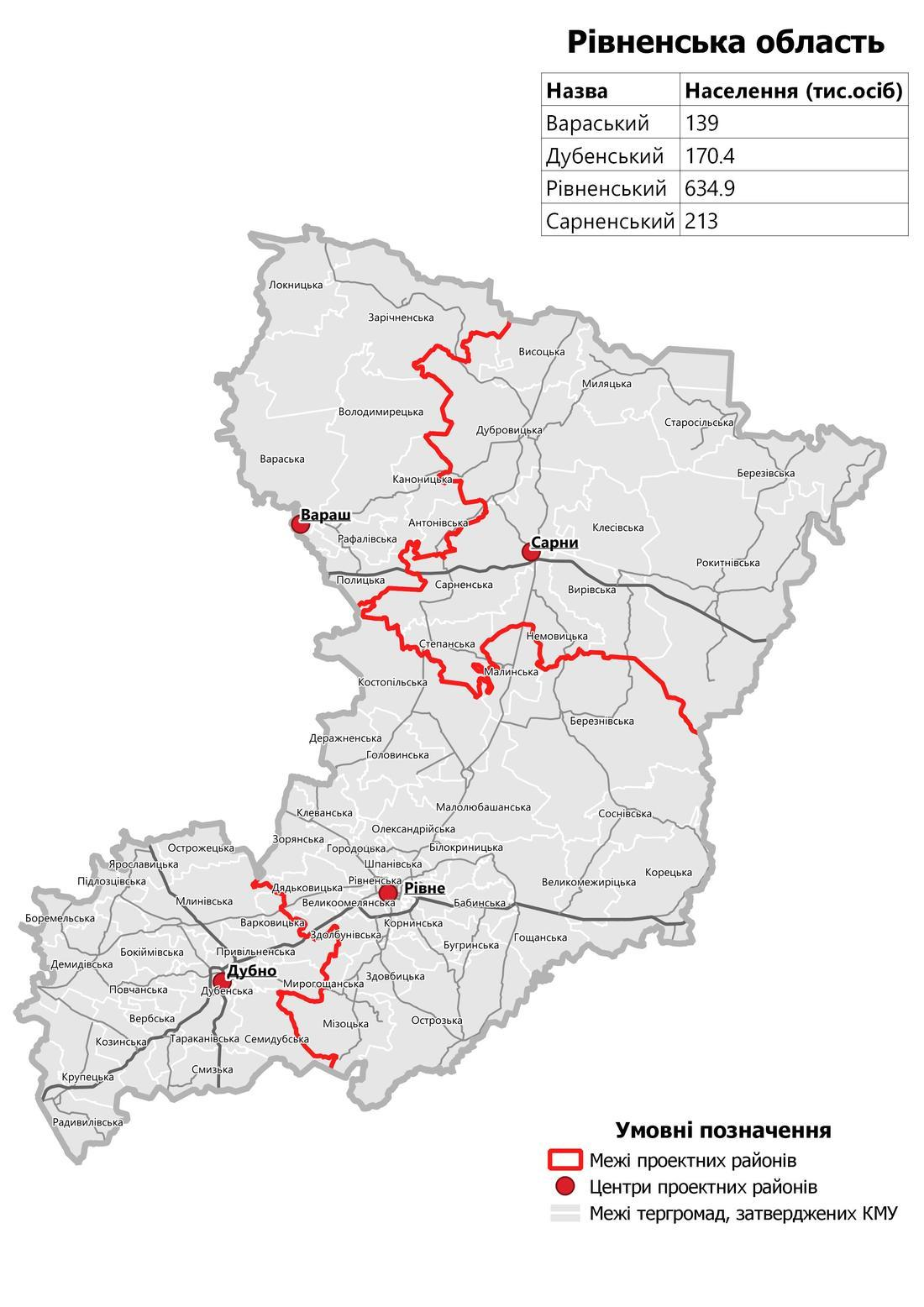
Raions of Rivne Oblast as of August 2020.

On 18 July 2020, the number of districts was reduced to four. These are:

1. Dubno (Дубенський район), the center is in the town of Dubno;
2. Rivne (Рівненський район), the center is in the city of Rivne;
3. Sarny (Сарненський район), the center is in the town of Sarny;
4. Varash (Вараський район), the center is in the town of Varash.

**Rivne Oblast**
As of January 1, 2022
Number of districts (райони)	4
Number of hromadas (громади)	64

=== Communities (hromadas) per Raion ===
In bold are communities (hromadas) with cities

Dubno Raion

- Bokiyma
- Boremel
- Demydivka
- **Dubno**
- Kozyn
- Krupets
- Myrohoshcha
- Mlyniv
- Ostrozhets
- Pidloztsi
- Povcha
- Pryvilne
- **Radyvyliv**
- Semyduby
- Smyha
- Tarakaniv
- Varkovychi
- Verba
- Yaroslavychi

Rivne Raion

- Babyn
- **Berezne**
- Bila Krynytsia
- Buhryn
- Derazhne
- Dyadkovychi
- Holovyn
- Horodok
- Hoshcha
- Klevan
- **Korets**
- Kornyn
- **Kostopil**
- Mala Liubasha
- Malynsk
- Mizoch
- Oleksandriya
- **Ostroh**
- **Rivne**
- Shpaniv
- Sosnove
- Velyki Mezhyrichi
- Velyka Omelyana
- **Zdolbuniv**
- Zdovbytsia
- Zorya

Sarny Raion

- Berezove
- **Dubrovytsia**
- Klesiv
- Myliach
- Nemovychi
- Rokytne
- **Sarny**
- Stare Selo
- Stepan
- Vyry
- Vysotsk

Varash Raion

- Antonivka
- Kanonychi
- Loknytsia
- Polytsi
- Rafalivka
- **Varash**
- Volodymyrets
- Zarichne

== Administrative divisions until 2020 ==
Raions of Rivne Oblast as of June 2020. The city of Rivne is shown in dark blue.

Before 2020, Rivne Oblast was subdivided into 20 regions: 16 districts (raions) and 4 city municipalities (mis'krada or misto), officially known as territories governed by city councils.

- Cities under the oblast's jurisdiction:
  - Rivne (Рівне), the administrative center of the oblast
  - Dubno (Дубно)
  - Ostroh (Острог)
  - Varash (Вараш), formerly Kuznetzovsk
- Districts (raions):
  - Berezne (Березнівський район)
    - Cities and towns under the district's jurisdiction:
      - Berezne (Березне)
    - Urban-type settlements under the district's jurisdiction:
      - Sosnove (Соснове)
  - Demydivka (Демидівський район)
    - Urban-type settlements under the district's jurisdiction:
      - Demydivka (Демидівка)
  - Dubno (Дубенський район)
    - Urban-type settlements under the district's jurisdiction:
      - Smyha (Смига)
  - Dubrovytsia (Дубровицький район)
    - Cities and towns under the district's jurisdiction:
      - Dubrovytsia (Дубровиця)
  - Hoshcha (Гощанський район)
    - Urban-type settlements under the district's jurisdiction:
      - Hoshcha (Гоща)
  - Korets (Корецький район)
    - Cities and towns under the district's jurisdiction:
      - Korets (Корець)
  - Kostopil (Костопільський район)
    - Cities and towns under the district's jurisdiction:
      - Kostopil (Костопіль)
  - Mlyniv (Млинівський район)
    - Urban-type settlements under the district's jurisdiction:
      - Mlyniv (Млинів)
  - Ostroh (Острозький район)
  - Radyvyliv (Радивилівський район)
    - Cities and towns under the district's jurisdiction:
      - Radyvyliv (Радивилів)
  - Rivne (Рівненський район)
    - Urban-type settlements under the district's jurisdiction:
      - Klevan (Клевань)
      - Kvasyliv (Квасилів)
      - Orzhiv (Оржів)
  - Rokytne (Рокитнівський район)
    - Urban-type settlements under the district's jurisdiction:
      - Rokytne (Рокитне)
      - Tomashhorod (Томашгород)
  - Sarny (Сарненський район)
    - Cities and towns under the district's jurisdiction:
      - Sarny (Сарни)
    - Urban-type settlements under the district's jurisdiction:
      - Klesiv (Клесів)
      - Stepan (Степань)
  - Volodymyrets (Володимирецький район)
    - Urban-type settlements under the district's jurisdiction:
      - Rafalivka (Рафалівка)
      - Volodymyrets (Володимирець)
  - Zarichne (Зарічненський район)
    - Urban-type settlements under the district's jurisdiction:
      - Zarichne (Зарічне)
  - Zdolbuniv (Здолбунівський район)
    - Cities and towns under the district's jurisdiction:
      - Zdolbuniv (Здолбунів)
    - Urban-type settlements under the district's jurisdiction:
      - Mizoch (Мізоч)
