= List of cities in Rivne Oblast =

Location of cities in Rivne Oblast

There are 11 populated places in Rivne Oblast, Ukraine, that have been officially granted city status (Ukrainian: місто, romanized: misto) by the Verkhovna Rada, the country's parliament. Settlements with more than 10,000 people are eligible for city status, although the status is typically also granted to settlements of historical or regional importance. As of 5 December 2001, the date of the first and only official census in the country since independence, (Note: As of 11 July 2023) the most populous city in the oblast was the regional capital, Rivne, with a population of 248,813 people, while the least populous city was Korets, with 8,649 people. Following the passing of decommunization laws, one city within the oblast, Varash, was renamed in 2016 from its previous name, Kuznetsovsk, for its connection with people, places, events, and organizations associated with the Soviet Union.

From independence in 1991 to 2020, four cities in the oblast were designated as cities of regional significance (municipalities), which had self-government under city councils, while the oblast's remaining seven cities were located in sixteen raions (districts) as cities of district significance, which are subordinated to the governments of the raions. On 18 July 2020, an administrative reform abolished and merged the oblast's raions and cities of regional significance into four new, expanded raions. The four raions that make up the oblast are Dubno, Rivne, Sarny, and Varash.

== List of cities ==
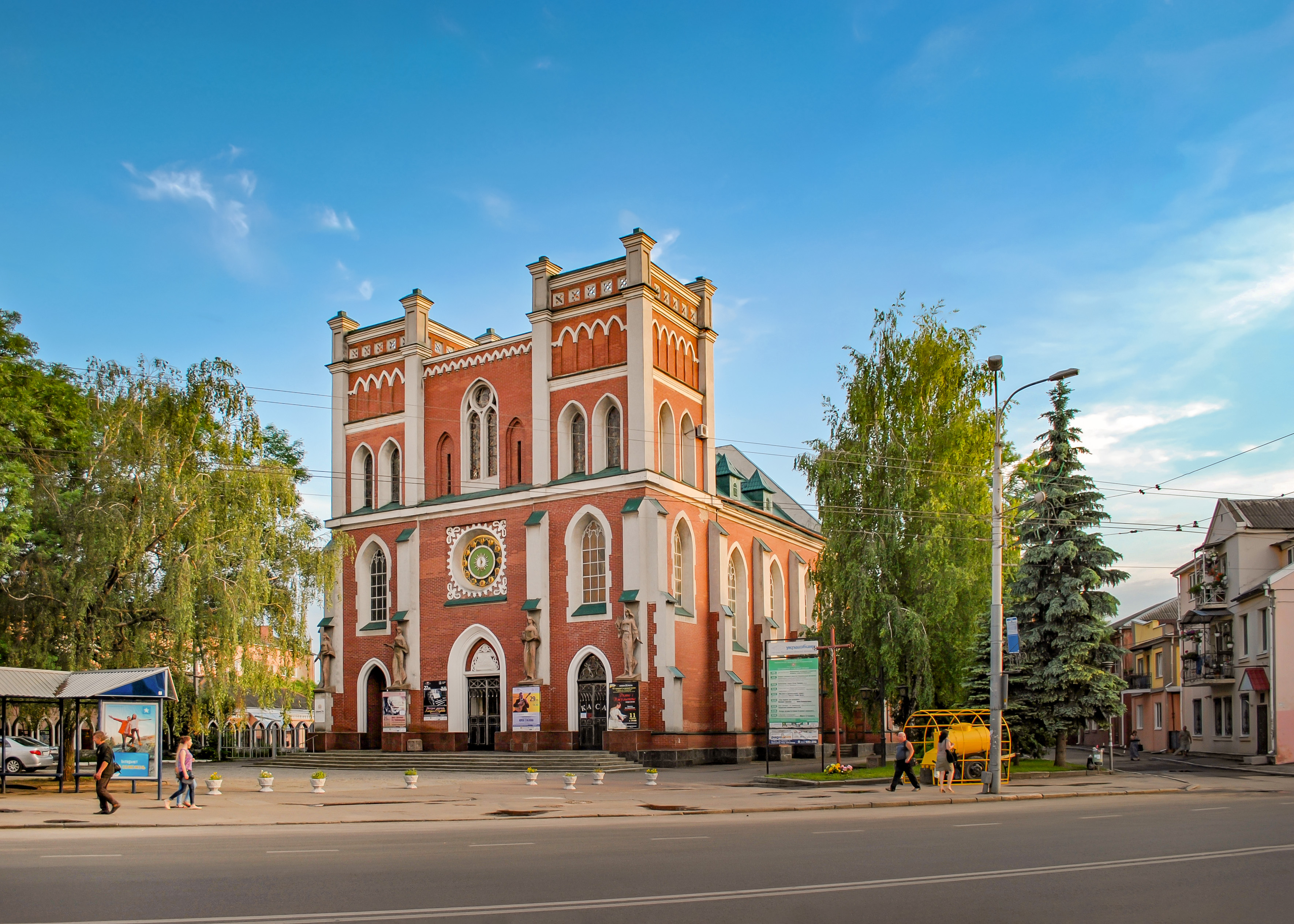
Rivne, capital and most populous city in Rivne Oblast

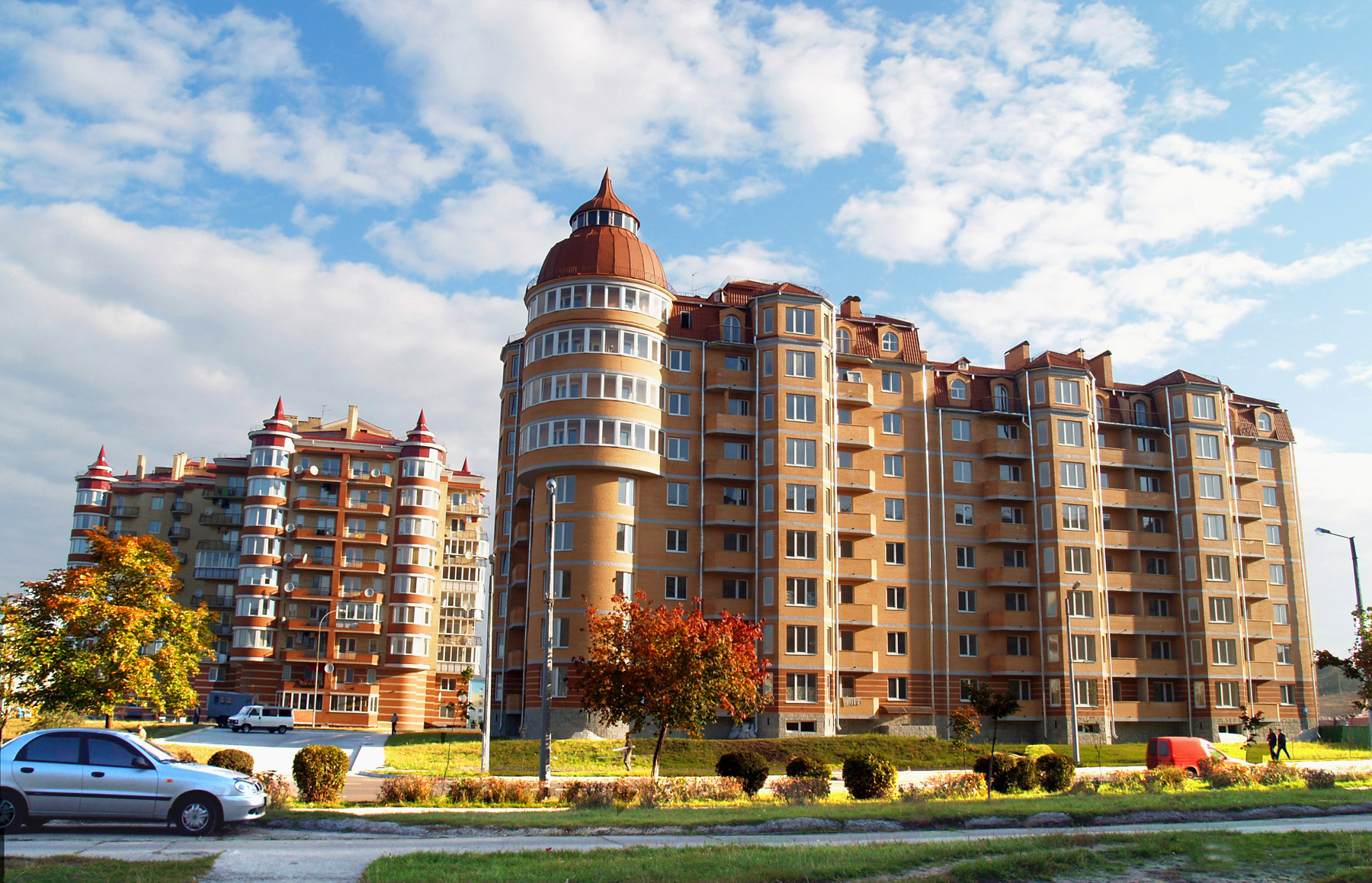
Varash, third most populous city in the oblast and site of the Rivne Nuclear Power Plant

Cities in Rivne Oblast
| Name | Name (in Ukrainian) (Note: Links to the Ukrainian Wikipedia articles for each city) | Raion (district) | Population (2022 estimates) | Population (2001 census) | Population change |
|---|---|---|---|---|---|
| Berezne | Березне | Rivne | 13,126 | 13,669 | −3.97% |
| Dubno | Дубно | Dubno | 36,901 | 39,146 | −5.73% |
| Dubrovytsia | Дубровиця | Sarny | 9,343 | 9,644 | −3.12% |
| Korets | Корець | Rivne | 6,914 | 8,649 | −20.06% |
| Kostopil | Костопіль | Rivne | 30,838 | 30,467 | +1.22% |
| Ostroh | Острог | Rivne | 14,894 | 14,801 | +0.63% |
| Radyvyliv | Радивилів | Dubno | 10,427 | 10,311 | +1.13% |
| Rivne | Рівне | Rivne | 243,873 | 248,813 | −1.99% |
| Sarny | Сарни | Sarny | 28,626 | 28,144 | +1.71% |
| Varash | Вараш | Varash | 41,711 | 38,830 | +7.42% |
| Zdolbuniv | Здолбунів | Rivne | 24,501 | 24,612 | −0.45% |

== See also ==
- List of cities in Ukraine
