= Sarny massacre =

1942 German-Ukrainian killing of Jews in Poland

- Location: Sarny
- Type: Massacre
- Cause: Holocaust
- Target: Jewish and Roma civilians
- Deaths: 14,000-18,000

The Sarny massacre was the execution of an estimated 14,000-18,000 people, mostly Jews, in the Nazi-occupied Polish city of Sarny (now Rivne Oblast of Ukraine) on August 27-28, 1942.

== History ==
=== Before the massacre ===
The city of Sarny, then part of Poland between 1919 and 1939, was captured by Nazi Germany on July 8, 1941, following the German attack on the Soviet Union on June 22, 1941. Sarny had a Jewish population of between 5,000 and 7,000. Soviet forces, who had occupied the city following the Ribbentrop-Molotov Pact and the Soviet invasion of Poland in 1939, retreated. Ukrainian nationalists did not retreat with the Soviet forces, but instead saw an opportunity to support the independence of Ukraine through alliances with the Nazis.

Shortly following the German occupation, the Nazis permitted Ukrainians to loot Jewish assets over a three-day period. The Nazis also commandeered Jews as forced labour. After the looting by Ukrainians, the Jews of Sarny were forced to hand over most assets to the Nazis, with orders largely enforced by the Ukrainian Auxiliary Police, a volunteer organisation established by the Nazis.

Between April 2 and 4, 1942, a ghetto was established in Sarny, into which were forced the Jews from Sarny and the surrounding towns. Approximately 6,000 Jews were forced into the ghetto.

In August 1942, the Jews in the Sarny ghetto were moved to the Poleska camp in Sarny. This camp already contained an estimated 15,000 Jews who had been forced there from various points in northeast Volhynia. The name "Poleska" referred to an area in Sarny of predominantly Polish settlement, with such settlement having been encouraged by the Polish government, subsequent to its occupation of the city in 1921.

Later in August 1942, immediately prior to the massacre, more Jews from surrounding towns were forcibly moved to Sarny. One such town was Berezhnitza, also known as Bereznica, then a predominantly Jewish town of approximately 1,400 people, approximately fifteen miles northwest of Sarny. On August 26, 1942, the remaining Jews in Berezhnitza, numbering approximately 1,000, were marched to Sarny, with approximately half being murdered during the journey. Similarly, on August 26, 1942, the entire Jewish population of nearby Rokitno was ordered into the market square, where people were systematically shot or herded into waiting rail cars, destined for Sarny. Jews were also forcibly transferred to Sarny from the towns of Tomashgorod, Klesov and Dubrovitsa.

=== Massacre ===
The Sarny Massacre II took place over two days, on August 27–28, 1942. It is estimated that between 14,000 and 18,000 people, mostly Jews from Sarny and surrounding towns, including an estimated 100 Roma, were systematically executed in the ravines on the outskirts of the town, where pits had been prepared. The executions were carried out by German troops and the Ukrainian Auxiliary Police, assisted by some 200 members of Organization Todt. Some escaped the massacre by running into the nearby forests after some of the prisoners set fire to huts in the camp and urged people to flee. Thousands attempted to escape, with many being murdered on the streets of Sarny, or otherwise during the course of attempted flight.

=== Aftermath ===
As of 1945, approximately 100 people were identified as Holocaust survivors from Sarny. It is unclear how many of these survivors had escaped the massacre on August 27–28, 1942. The remnants of the Sarny community fenced in the local Jewish cemetery and restored the tombstones that had previously been used as pavement stones. The cemetery was later destroyed through the construction of a football stadium over it.

Three memorials commemorating those killed in the Sarny Massacre, made of three mountains of bones covered with sand, have been erected at the site of the Sarny Massacre. A memorial to those killed has also been erected in Holon Cemetery, Israel. A memorial book of the history of the Jewish community in Sarny was published in 1961, containing first-person accounts by community survivors.
