= Rokytne Raion, Rivne Oblast =

Former subdivision of Rivne Oblast, Ukraine

Rokytne Raion Рокитнівський район
- Raion
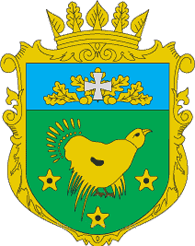
- Flag Coat of arms

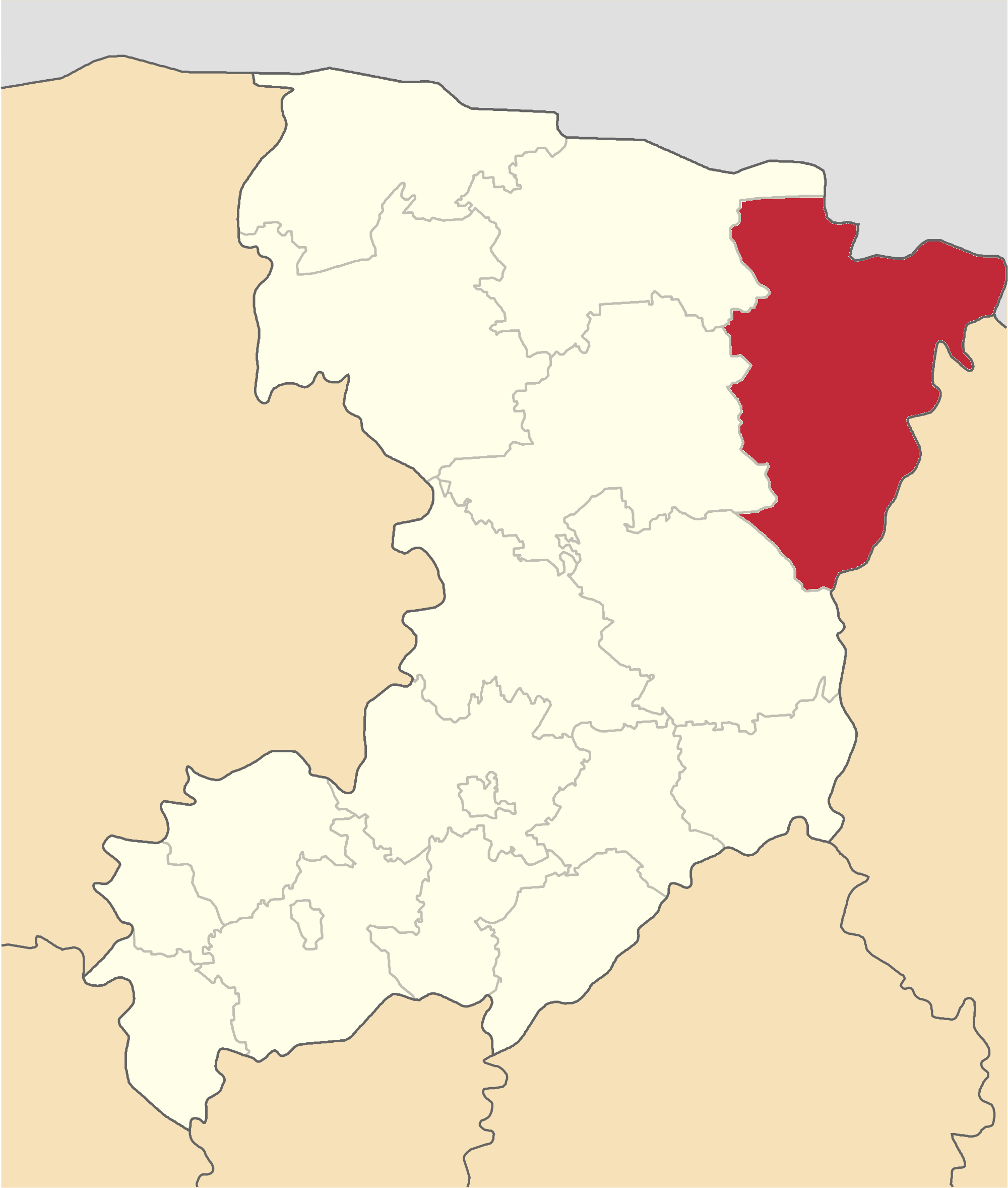
- Coordinates: 51°23′31″N 27°15′39″E
- Country: Ukraine
- Oblast: Rivne Oblast
- Established: 1939
- Disestablished: 18 July 2020
- Admin. center: Rokytne
- Subdivisions: List: — city councils; — settlement councils; — rural councils; Number of localities: — cities; — urban-type settlements; 37 — villages; — rural settlements

Area
  - Total: 2,350 km^{2} (910 sq mi)

Population (2020)
  - Total: 58,223
  - Density: 24.8/km^{2} (64.2/sq mi)
- Time zone: UTC+02:00 (EET)
  - Summer (DST): UTC+03:00 (EEST)
- Area code: +380
- Website: http://www.rv.gov.ua/sitenew/rokytnivsk Rokytne Raion

Rokytne Raion (Ukrainian: Рокитнівський район) was a raion in Rivne Oblast in western Ukraine. Its administrative centre was the urban-type settlement of Rokytne. The raion was abolished and its territory was merged into Sarny Raion on 18 July 2020 as part of the administrative reform of Ukraine, which reduced the number of raions of Rivne Oblast to four. The last estimate of the raion population was 58,223 (2020 est.)

== Demographics ==
Rokytne Raion was probably the place with the highest birth rate in all of Ukraine. The Raion recorded a birth rate of 24.0 per 1,000 in 2008. The village council of Hlynne is widely regarded as holding the record for the highest birth rate in all of Europe.

- Births (2011) : 1,304 births at 24.0 per 1,000
- Births (2012) : 1,391 births at 25.9 per 1,000
- Births (2014) : 1,328 births at 24.0 per 1,000
- Births (2016) : 1,177 births at 20.6 per 1,000
- Births (2017) : 1,064 births at 18.5 per 1,000
- Births (2018) : 1,050 births at 18.2 per 1,000
- Deaths (2011) : 615 deaths at 11.3 per 1,000
- Deaths (2012) : 595 deaths at 11.1 per 1,000
- Deaths (2014) : 617 deaths at 11.2 per 1,000
- Deaths (2016) : 607 deaths at 10.6 per 1,000
- Deaths (2017) : 593 deaths at 10.3 per 1,000
- Deaths (2018) : 575 deaths at 10.0 per 1,000

== World War II ==
On 26 August 1942, after living under a reign of terror for just over a year, the Jews of Rokytne were ordered to gather in the central market square for deportation to a killing site outside the town. When many of them realized what was about to occur, the crowd began to panic. As people began to run, Nazi and Ukrainian police began to shoot. People were systematically shot or herded into waiting rail cars, destined for Sarny. Jews were also forcibly transferred to Sarny from the towns of Tomashorod, Klesiv and Dubrovytsia.

This event is collectively referred to as part of the 1942 Sarny Massacre.

== See also ==
- Subdivisions of Ukraine
