= Myliach rural hromada =

Municipality in Rivne Oblast, Ukraine

Myliach rural hromada Миляцька сільська громада
- Hromada
- Interactive map of Myliach rural hromada
- Country: Ukraine
- Oblast (province): Rivne Oblast
- Raion (district): Sarny Raion
- Established: 2020
- Administrative center: Myliach

Area
  - Total: 422.5 km^{2} (163.1 sq mi)

Population
  - Total: 6,164
  - Density: 14.59/km^{2} (37.79/sq mi)

Myliach rural hromada is one of the hromadas of Sarny Raion in Rivne Oblast of Ukraine. Its administrative centre is the village of Myliach.

== Composition ==
The hromada consists of 9 villages:

- Budymlia
- Bile
- Khochyn
- Luhove
- Myliach (administrative centre)
- Perebrody
- Smorodsk
- Udrytsk
- Zhaden
