= Rivne Nature Reserve =

Nature reserve in Rivne Oblast, Ukraine

Rivnenskyi Nature Reserve
- Ukrainian: Рівненський природний заповідник
- IUCN category Ia (strict nature reserve)
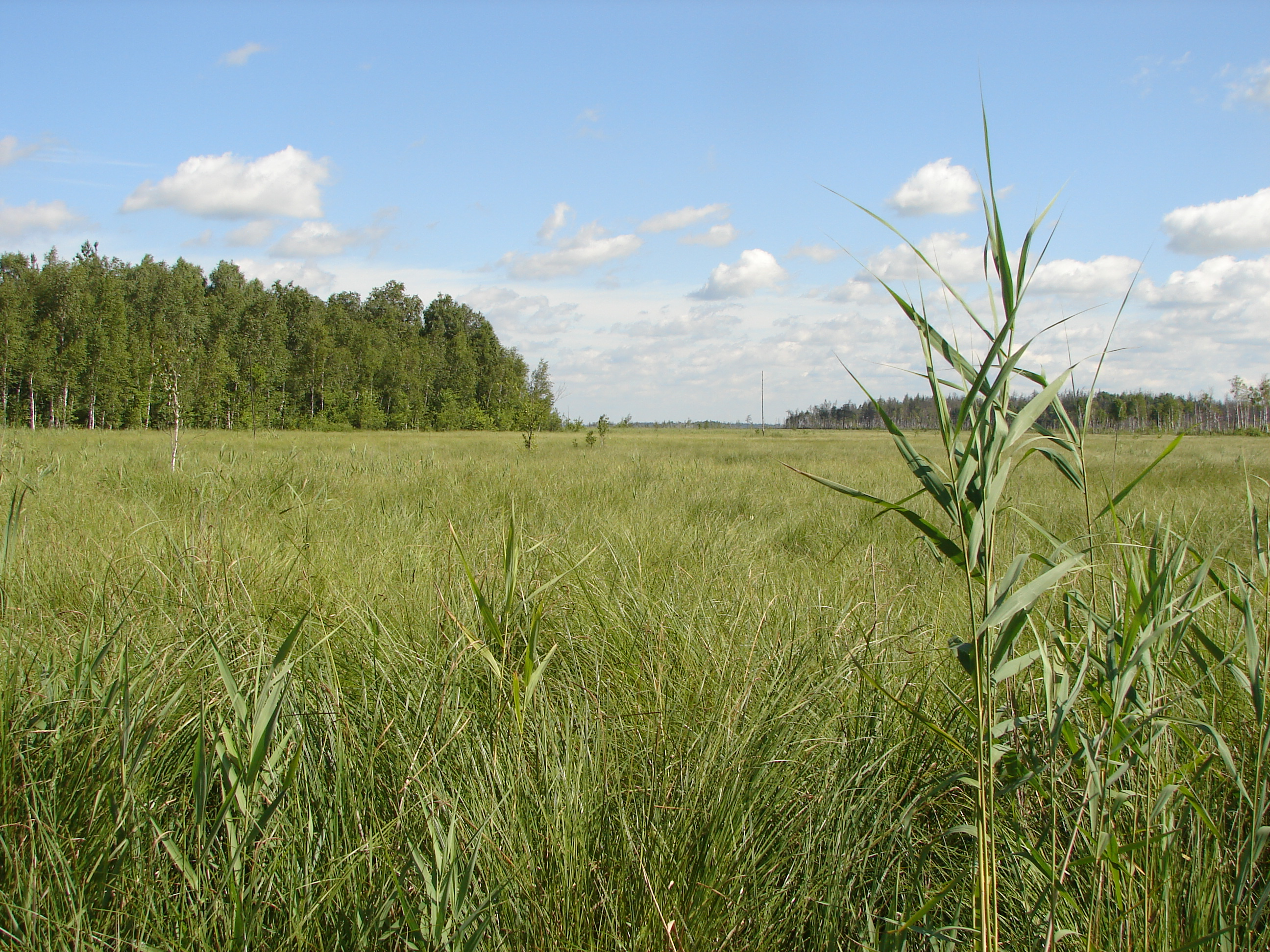
- Rivne Nature Reserve

- Location within Ukraine
- Location: Rivne Oblast
- Coordinates: 51°23′40″N 26°50′50″E
- Area: 42,289 hectares (104,498 acres; 423 km^{2}; 163 sq mi)
- Established: 1999
- Website: Official website

The Rivne Nature Reserve (Ukrainian: Рівненський природний заповідник, romanized: Rivnenskyi Nature Reserve) is a strict nature reserve in the northwest of Ukraine, created to protect and study the representative landscape of the Polissia region. It was established by the President of Ukraine, Leonid Danylovych Kuchma, on April 3, 1999. In accordance with the Resolution of the Cabinet of Ministers of Ukraine on August 14, 2003, the reserve was permanently transferred to a land area of 42,288 km^{2}.

== Topography ==
The territory of the reserve consists of four separate areas which have had Conservation status since 1984:

- Landscape Area: "White Lake" (Volodymyretska district)
- Zoological Area: "Perebrodivskyy" (Dubrovitsky and Rokytnivskyi districts)
- Botanical Area: "Sira Poguonya" (Rokytnivskyi district)
- Hydrological Area: "Somyno" (Sarny district)

This is the largest area Ukraine has taken under protection, and the best preserved area of bog massifs. The reserve was created to preserve the natural state of typical and unique natural complexes of the Ukrainian Polesia. As a result of Ukraine's geographical position, the reserve belongs to the Volyn Polissya zone of mixed forests. It exemplifies the main landscape features characteristic of this part of Ukraine: the flat terrain, predominance of sand, surplus moisture, high forestation, and swamps. The "Belaazyorsk" Array forms part of the "Verhnopryp'yatskoho" physiographic region where many large lakes and floods originate. About 10% of the area is occupied by swamps. The "Somyno", "Sira Poguonya", and "Perebrody" Arrays belong to "Nyzhnohorynskoho" physiographic region. This area is the most waterlogged part of Ukrainian Polissya. Bogs occupy about 20% of the area.

In geographical terms, it is plain with a foundation of bedrock that lies at a depth of 200 meters and is covered by ice, glaciers, and alluvial sediments. Among the four areas of the reserve, moraines were found only in White Lake. The soil in all four areas consists mostly of peat.

== Climate ==
The climate of the Rivne reserve is Humid continental climate, warm summer (Köppen climate classification (Dfb)). This climate is characterized by large seasonal temperature differentials and a warm summer (at least four months averaging over 10 °C (50 °F), but no month averaging over 22 °C (72 °F). Total annual precipitation averages between 550 and 600 mm during the active growing season, which is 150–155 days. This zone has an average temperature of 18.5 °C in July, -5.5 °C in January, and an average annual temperature of 6 to 7 °C.

The reserve is located in the Central European mixed forests ecoregion, a temperate hardwood forest covering much of northeastern Europe, from Germany to Russia.

== Flora ==
Forests and swamps dominate in the reserve (48.3% and 48.5% respectively). Pine forests are one of the major forest areas. Another is birch: there are a significant amount of birch trees in many areas in stands, but birch and pine forests are widely scattered throughout the park. In local areas, deciduous forests have been formed by beech and oak trees. A very small area is covered with forests of black alder.

The swamp vegetation of the reserve is unique. Its composition is dominated by mesotrophic (bridge) swamps and to a lesser extent oligotrophic. Marshes, which have a covering of sphagnum, account for about 80% of all the wetlands. Eutrophic (lowland) bogs occupy 10-15% of the marshlands (the rest are intermediate marshes made up of oligotrophic and eutrophic lakes). Overall, the reserve preserves 13 plant and 25 animal species listed in the Green Book of Ukraine.

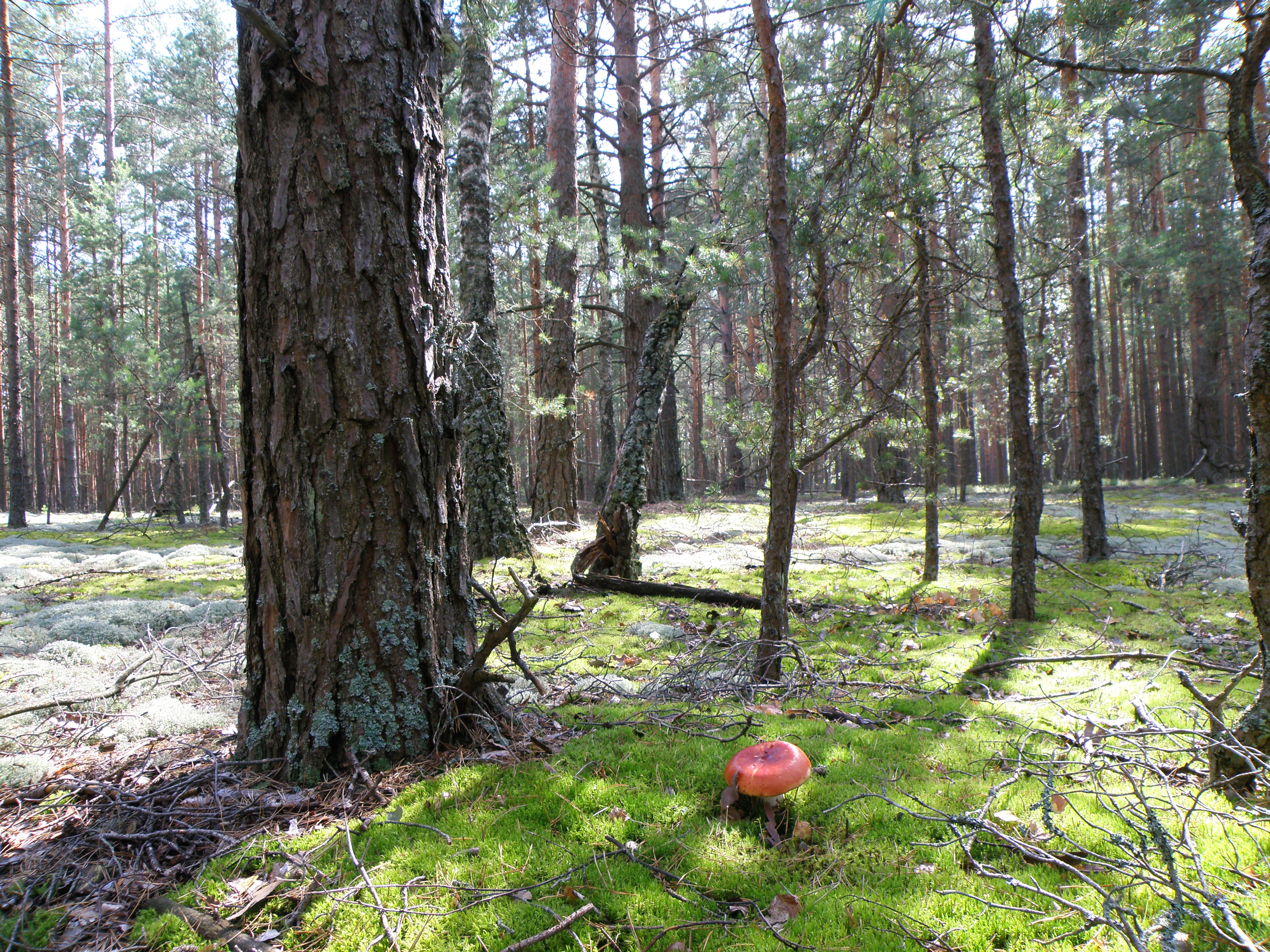
Pine forest in the Rivne reserve

The number of species of vascular plants in Rivnens’kyi reserve, according to preliminary data, is 563. The number of non-vascular plants is currently poorly understood, yet the presence of 20 species of bryophytes and 26 lichens has been noted. On the reserve, 101 species of fungi are registered.

In the flora on the reserve, 28 rare species were found and listed in the Red Book of Ukraine. There are several very rare species that are already in the Red Book of Ukraine, such as the dioecious sedge, and lapland willow. Among the plants that grow in the reserve, 2 species are in the European Red List, 1 species in Appendix 1 of the Bern Convention, and 28 species included in the list of regionally rare species.

== Fauna ==
The Fauna on the reserve represents typical Polissya animals. 26 species of mammals live in the reserve, the most numerous group being rodents. There are also predators - foxes, wolves, raccoon dogs, weasels, ermines, and others. Of particular note is the lynx, which lives in the "Perebrody" section of the reserve.

There are 165 tree-dwelling species of birds in the reserve. The northern, arboreal species are common- grouse, hazel-grouse, and occasionally wood grouse. Also, common is the forest snipe and the woodcock, which in other parts of Polissya are rare. In the lakes and White Somyno areas live mute swans and in coniferous forests bordering the marshes - black stork. Ordinary birds such as the kestrel, swamp harrier, buzzard, and hawk live there as well.

Within the reserve, there are 7 species of reptiles and 8 species of amphibians. The common viper, serpent, and copperhead, along with viviparous lizards such as the crested newt, all live in the reserve. There are 15 species of fish in the reserve reservoirs. In Lake, White eels, catfish, and other species typical of Polissya live. Overall, the fauna portion of the reserve has 221 species of vertebrates.

The Red Book of Ukraine lists 25 species of mammals, as well as birds, that are in present in the park. The European Red List includes 7 species found. Within the reserve are 124 animal species subject to special protection under the Berne Convention, 15 species classified as "red list" of the International Union for Conservation of Nature (IUCN), and 29 species considered regionally rare. The fauna area is needing of further study.
