= Sergey F. Dezhnyuk =

Ukrainian-American theologian, historian, and political analyst

- Сергій Ф. Дежнюк
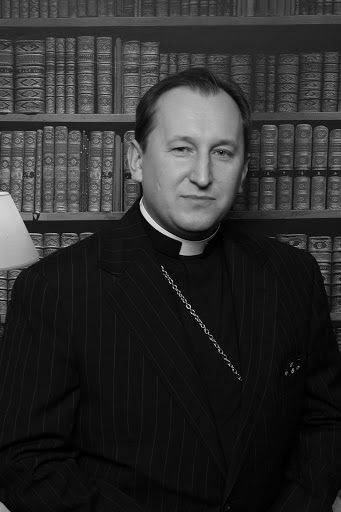
- Occupation(s): Theologian, historian, political analyst

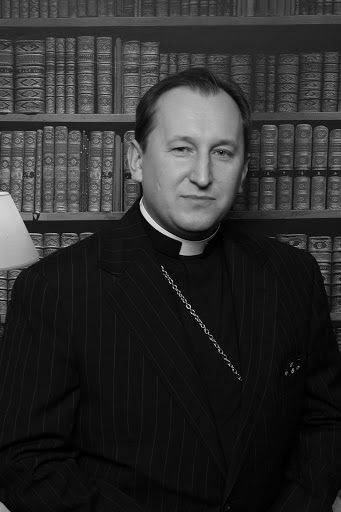

Serhii Fedorovych Dezhnyuk (Note: Ukrainian: Сергій Федорович Дежнюк, romanized: Serhii Fedorovych Dezhniuk) (born January 5, 1976) is a Ukrainian-American theologian, historian, and political analyst.

== Biography ==
He was a chair of the Ethnic Council, CBA of Oklahoma City until 2005. Since 2005, Dezhnyuk serves as a vice-president of Independent American Center of Political Monitoring. Dezhnyuk specializes in historical theology with a concentration on the Council of Florence and analysis of the Union it produced. He is the author of "Council of Florence: The Unrealized Union". As a former Ukrainian politician, he also writes on the topics that intersect religion and public life. Dezhnyuk is a member of American Society of Church History, The Historical Society of the Episcopal Church, and American Academy of Religion. Born in Rokytne, Rivne Oblast, Ukraine, Dezhnyuk currently resides in Tulsa, OK, USA.
