= Dubrovytsia Raion =

Former subdivision of Rivne Oblast, Ukraine

Dubrovytsia Raion Дубровицький район
- Raion
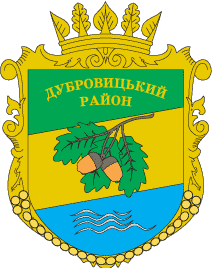
- Flag Coat of arms

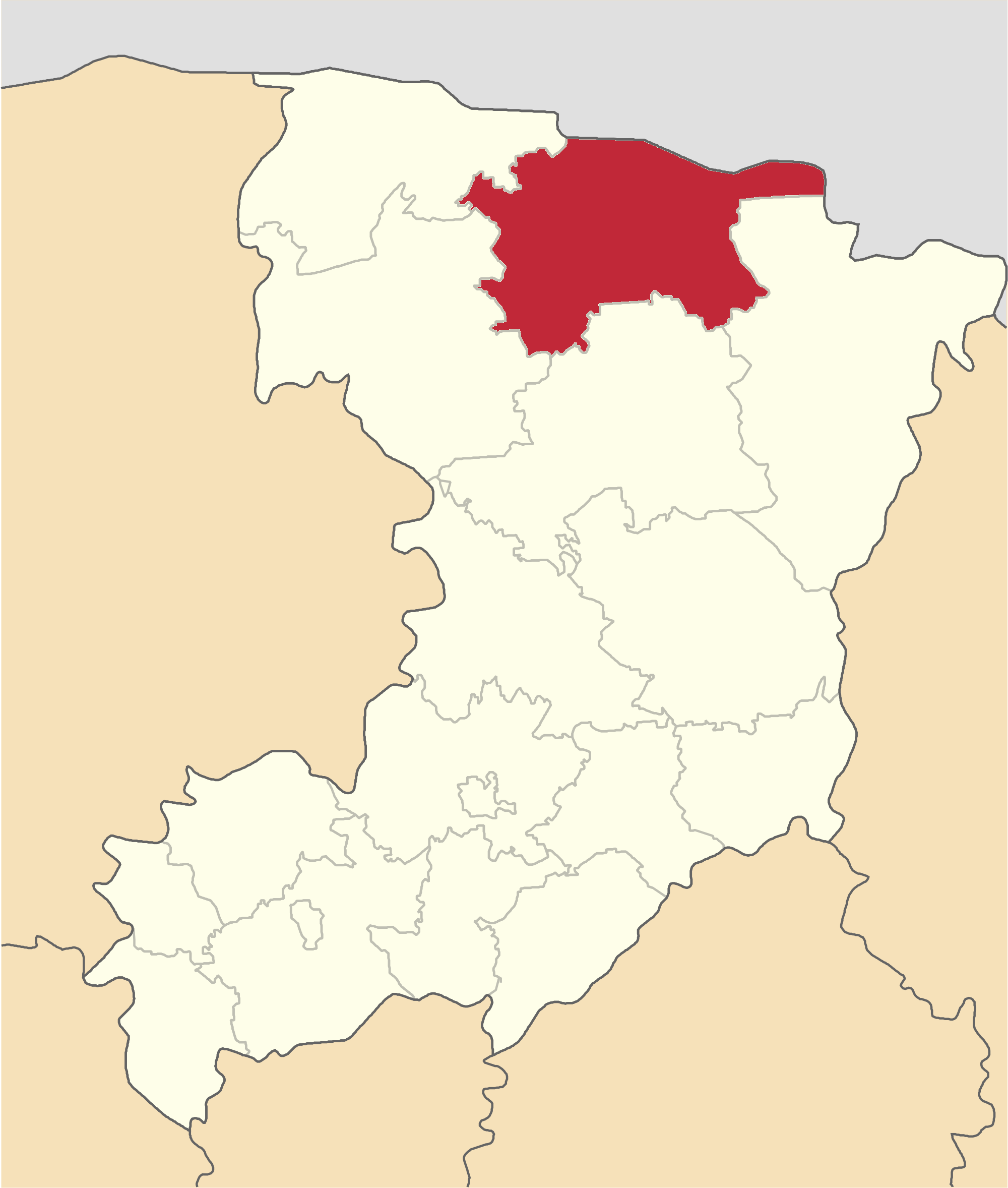
- Coordinates: 51°38′6.6474″N 26°38′56.1372″E
- Country: Ukraine
- Oblast: Rivne Oblast
- Established: 1939
- Disestablished: 18 July 2020
- Admin. center: Dubrovytsia
- Subdivisions: List: — city councils; — settlement councils; — rural councils; Number of localities: — cities; — urban-type settlements; 58 — villages; — rural settlements

Area
  - Total: 1,820 km^{2} (700 sq mi)

Population (2020)
  - Total: 46,727
  - Density: 25.7/km^{2} (66.5/sq mi)
- Time zone: UTC+02:00 (EET)
  - Summer (DST): UTC+03:00 (EEST)
- Area code: +380
- Website: http://www.rv.gov.ua/sitenew/dubrovytsk Dubrovytsia Raion

Dubrovytsia Raion (Ukrainian: Дубровицький район) was a raion in Rivne Oblast in western Ukraine. Its administrative center was the town of Dubrovytsia. The raion was abolished and its territory was merged into Sarny Raion on 18 July 2020 as part of the administrative reform of Ukraine, which reduced the number of raions of Rivne Oblast to four. The last estimate of the raion population was 46,727 (2020 est.)

== See also ==
- Subdivisions of Ukraine
