= Tomashhorod =

Rural locality in Rivne Oblast, Ukraine

Tomashhorod Томашгород
- Rural settlement
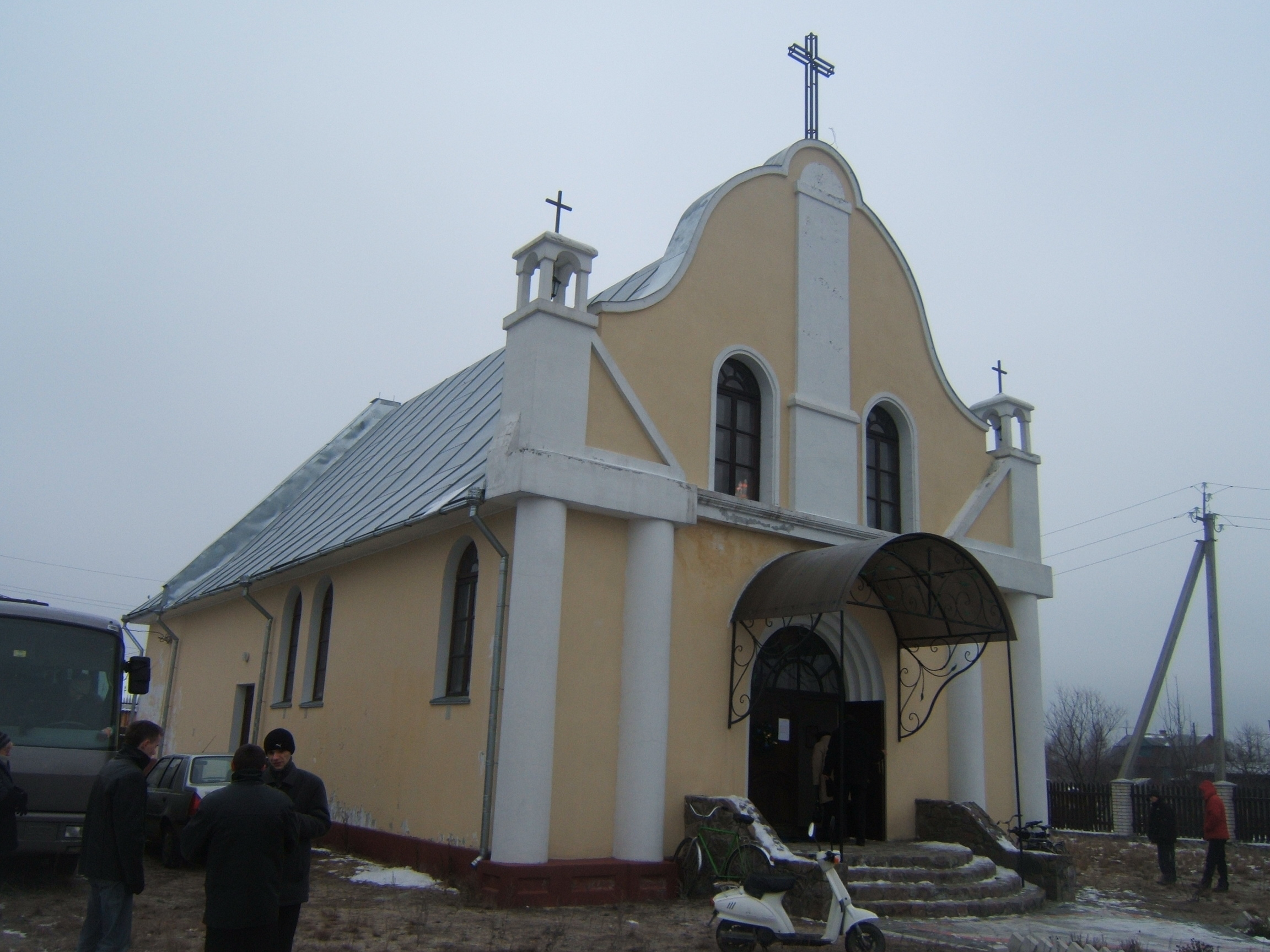
- Church in the area

- Location of Tomashhorod in Ukraine Tomashhorod (Ukraine)
- Coordinates: 51°18′44″N 27°01′30″E
- Country: Ukraine
- Oblast: Rivne Oblast
- Raion: Sarny Raion
- Founded: 1800
- Town status: 1960

Government
  - Mayor: Ivan Vlasyk

Area
  - Total: 107.31 km^{2} (41.43 sq mi)
- Elevation: 161 m (528 ft)

Population (2001)
  - Total: 2,535
  - Density: 23.62/km^{2} (61.18/sq mi)
- Time zone: UTC+2 (EET)
  - Summer (DST): UTC+3 (EEST)
- Postal code: 34240
- Area code: +380 3635
- Website: http://rada.gov.ua/

Tomashhorod (Ukrainian: Томашгород; Polish: Tomaszgród) is a rural settlement in Sarny Raion (district) of Rivne Oblast (province) in western Ukraine. Its population was 2,535 as of the 2001 Ukrainian Census. Current population: 2,406 (2022 estimate)

== History ==
Tomashhorod was first founded in 1800 and it acquired the status of an urban-type settlement in 1960. On 26 January 2024, a new law entered into force which abolished this status, and Tomashhorod became a rural settlement.
