= Demydivka Raion =

Former subdivision of Rivne Oblast, Ukraine

Demydivka Raion Демидівський район
- Raion
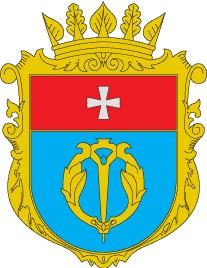
- Flag Coat of arms

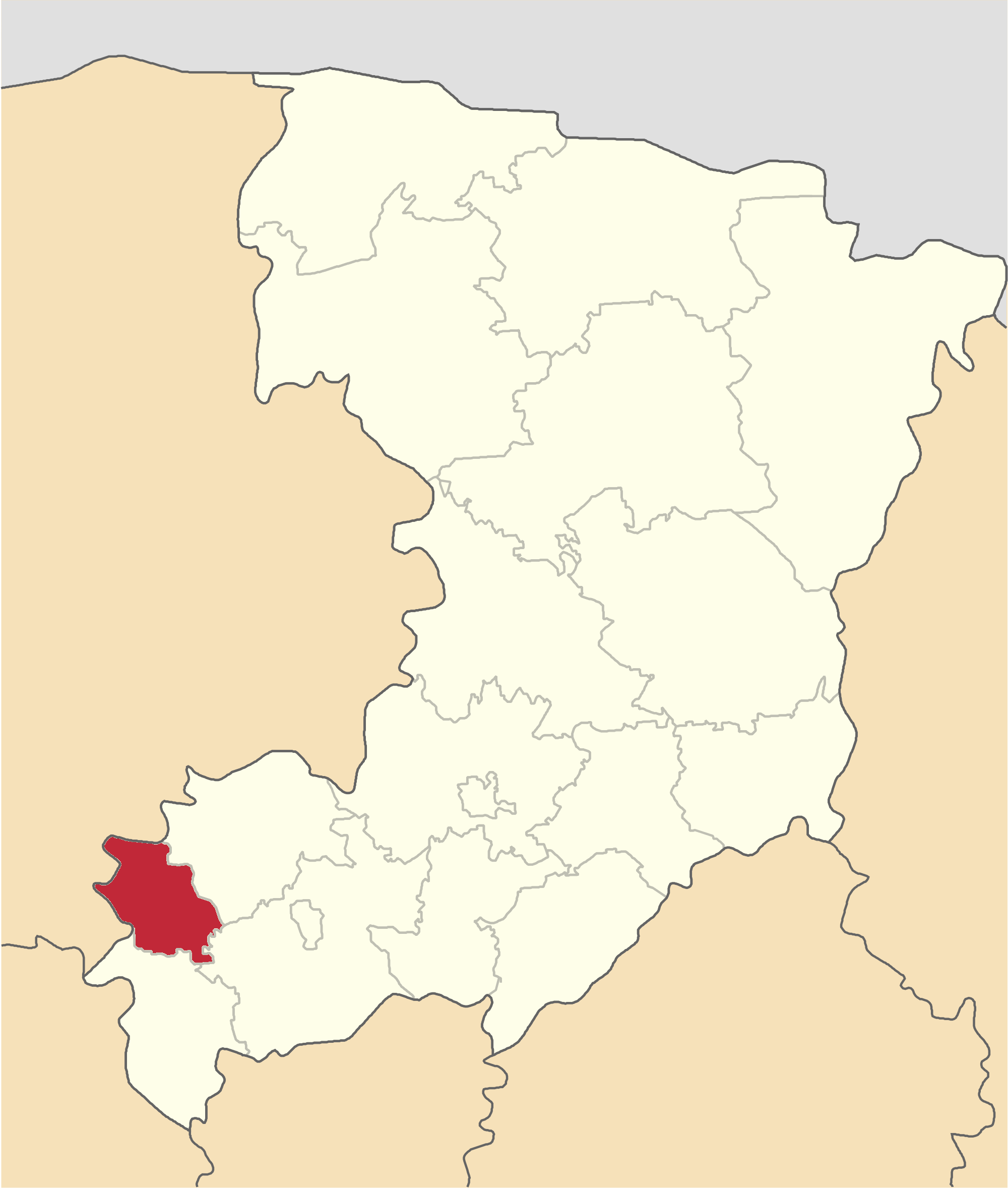
- Coordinates: 50°26′34.5582″N 25°17′20.6046″E
- Country: Ukraine
- Oblast: Rivne Oblast
- Established: 1995
- Disestablished: 18 July 2020
- Admin. center: Demydivka
- Subdivisions: List: — city councils; — settlement councils; — rural councils; Number of localities: — cities; — urban-type settlements; 30 — villages; — rural settlements

Area
  - Total: 377 km^{2} (146 sq mi)

Population (2020)
  - Total: 14,067
  - Density: 37.3/km^{2} (96.6/sq mi)
- Time zone: UTC+02:00 (EET)
  - Summer (DST): UTC+03:00 (EEST)
- Area code: +380
- Website: http://www.rv.gov.ua

Demydivka Raion (Ukrainian: Демидівський район) was a raion (district) in Rivne Oblast in western Ukraine. Its administrative center was the urban-type settlement of Demydivka. The raion was abolished and its territory was merged into Dubno Raion on 18 July 2020 as part of the administrative reform of Ukraine, which reduced the number of raions of Rivne Oblast to four. The last estimate of the raion population was 14,057 (2020 est.).

== See also ==
- Subdivisions of Ukraine
