= Rokytne, Rivne Oblast =

Rural settlement in Rivne Oblast, Ukraine

Rokytne Рокитне
- Rural settlement
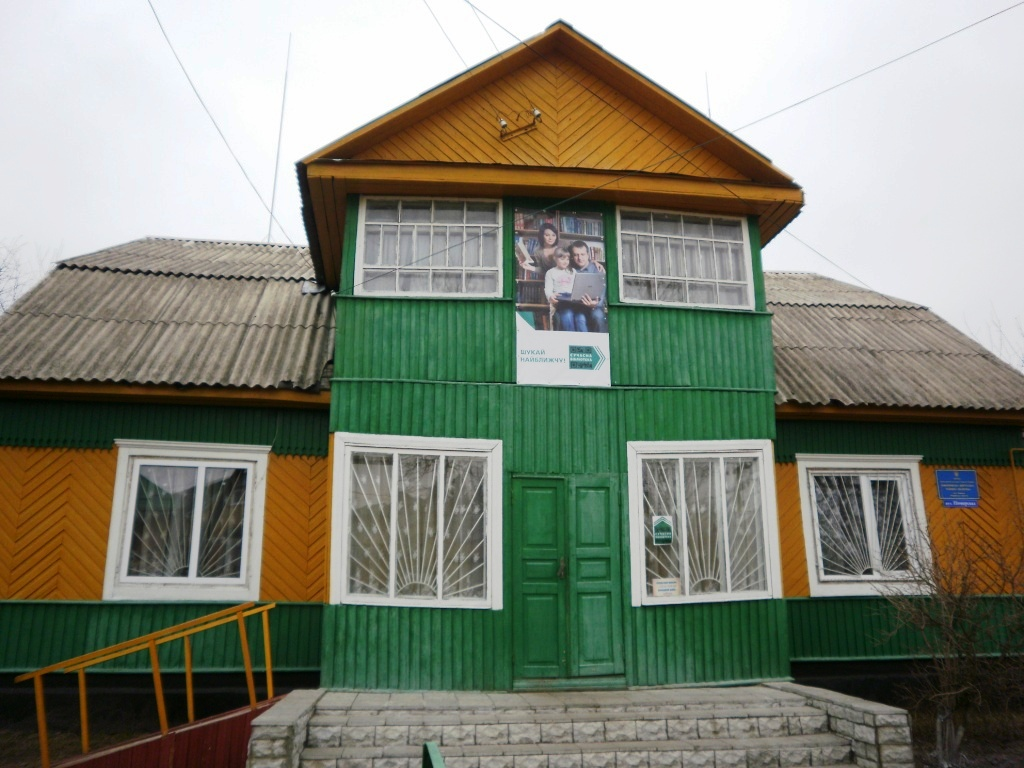
- Library in Rokytne

- Flag Coat of arms

- Location of Rokytne in Ukraine Rokytne (Ukraine)
- Coordinates: 51°17′14″N 27°12′37″E
- Country: Ukraine
- Oblast: Rivne Oblast
- Raion: Sarny Raion
- Hromada: Rokytne settlement hromada
- Founded: 1888
- Town status: 1940

Government
  - Town Head: Viktor Tatus

Area
  - Total: 5.52 km^{2} (2.13 sq mi)
- Elevation: 179 m (587 ft)

Population (2001)
  - Total: 7,143
  - Density: 1,290/km^{2} (3,350/sq mi)
- Time zone: UTC+2 (EET)
  - Summer (DST): UTC+3 (EEST)
- Postal code: 34200
- Area code: +380 3635
- Website: http://rada.gov.ua/

Rokytne (Ukrainian: Рокитне, Polish: Rokitno) is a rural settlement in Rivne Oblast in north-western Ukraine. It also formerly served as the administrative center of Rokytne Raion, housing the district's local administration buildings until the raion's abolition in 2020, and is now administered within Sarny Raion. Its population was 7,143 as of the 2001 Ukrainian Census. Current population: 6,521 (2022 estimate).

== History ==
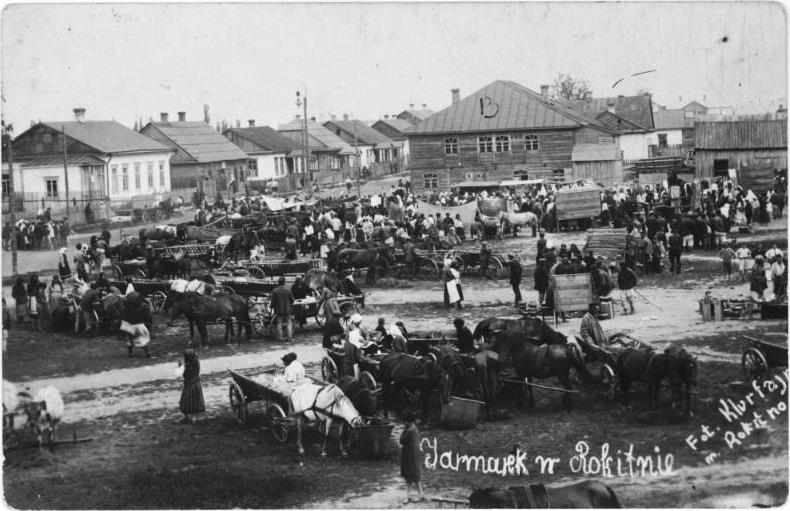
Rokitno in the interbellum

A settlement named Okhotnikove (Ukrainian: Охотнікове) was located on the territory of Rokytne since around the 17th century. In 1888, the village of Okhotnikove was incorporated, and it kept that name until it was renamed to "Rokytne" in 1922.

In the interwar period, Rokitno, as it was known in Polish, was administratively located in the Sarny County, first in the Polesie Voivodeship of Poland (until 1930), and afterwards in the Wołyń Voivodeship. According to the 1921 Polish census, the population was 46.5% Polish, 37.8% Jewish, 6.7% Ukrainian, 5.1% Russian and 3.4% German. It was granted town rights in 1927.

Following the invasion of Poland at the start of World War II in September 1939, Rokitno was first occupied by the Soviet Union until 1941, then by Nazi Germany until 1944, and then re-occupied by the Soviet Union, which eventually annexed it from Poland in 1945. It was downgraded to the status of an urban-type settlement in 1940.

Until 26 January 2024, Rokytne was designated urban-type settlement. On this day, a new law entered into force which abolished this status, and Rokytne became a rural settlement.

== Notable people ==
- Sergey F. Dezhnyuk (born 1976), Ukrainian-American theologian, historian, and political analyst
