= Dubrovytsia =

City in Rivne Oblast, Ukraine

Dubrovytsia Дубровиця
- City
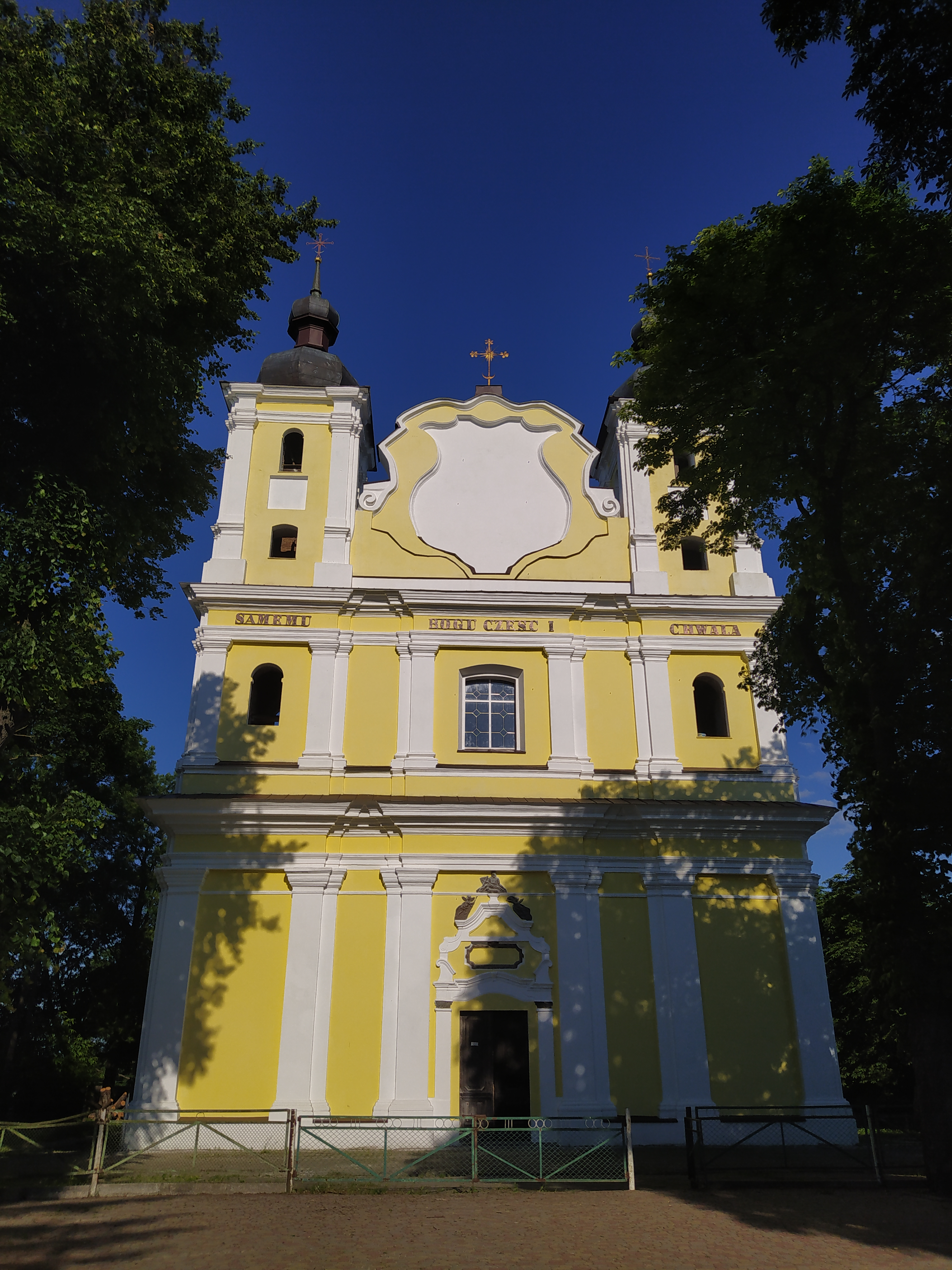
- Church of John the Baptist

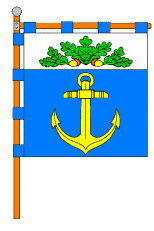
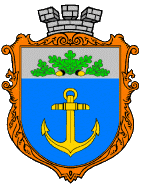
- Flag Coat of arms

- Location within Rivne Oblast Location within Ukraine
- Coordinates: 51°34′00″N 26°34′00″E
- Country: Ukraine
- Oblast: Rivne Oblast
- Raion: Sarny Raion
- Hromada: Dubrovytsia urban hromada
- Established: 1957

Government
  - Mayor: Bohdan Mykulsky

Area
  - Total: 58.7 km^{2} (22.7 sq mi)

Population (2022)
  - Total: 9,343
- Postal Code: 34100—34108
- Area code: +380-3658

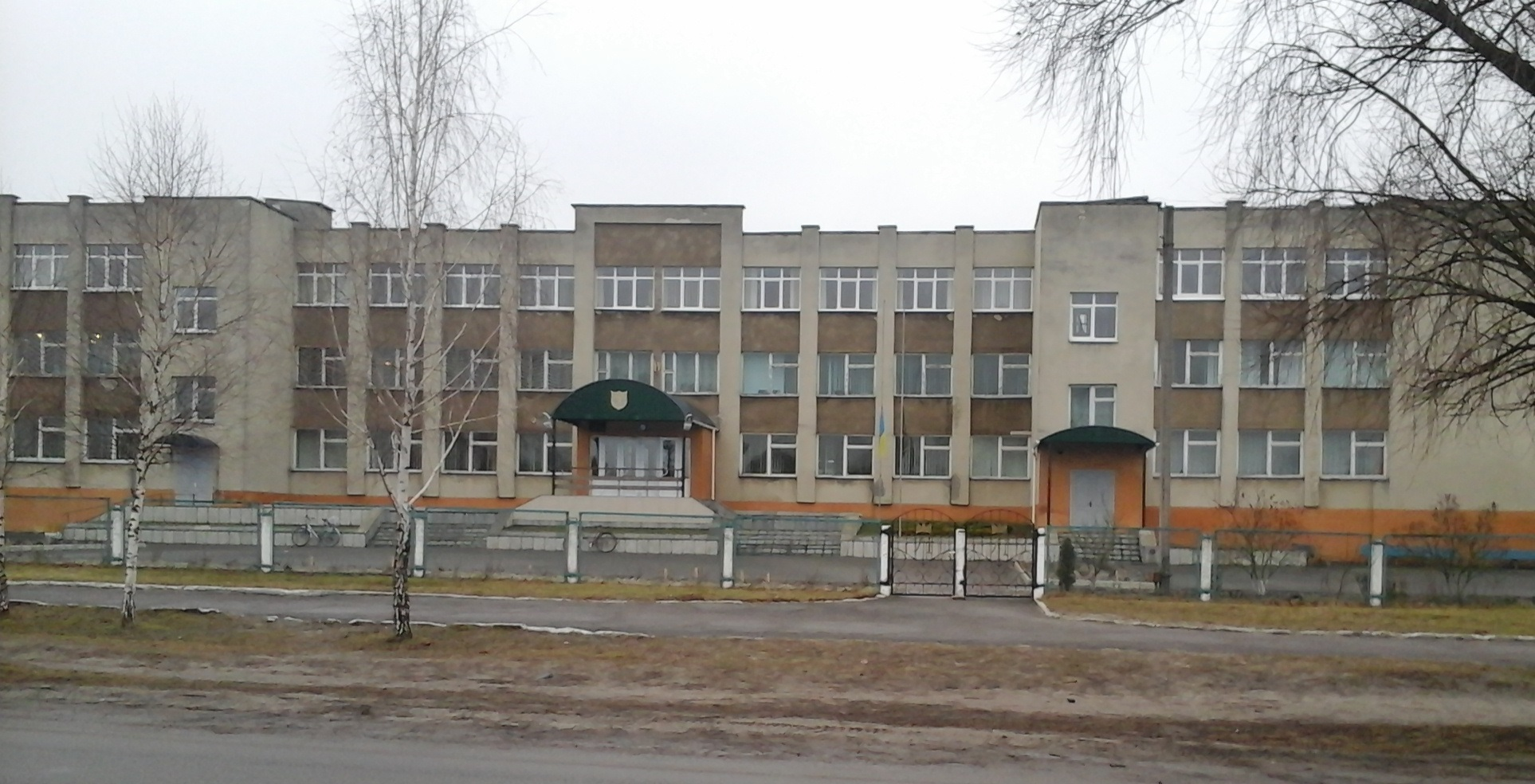
Dubrovytsia school

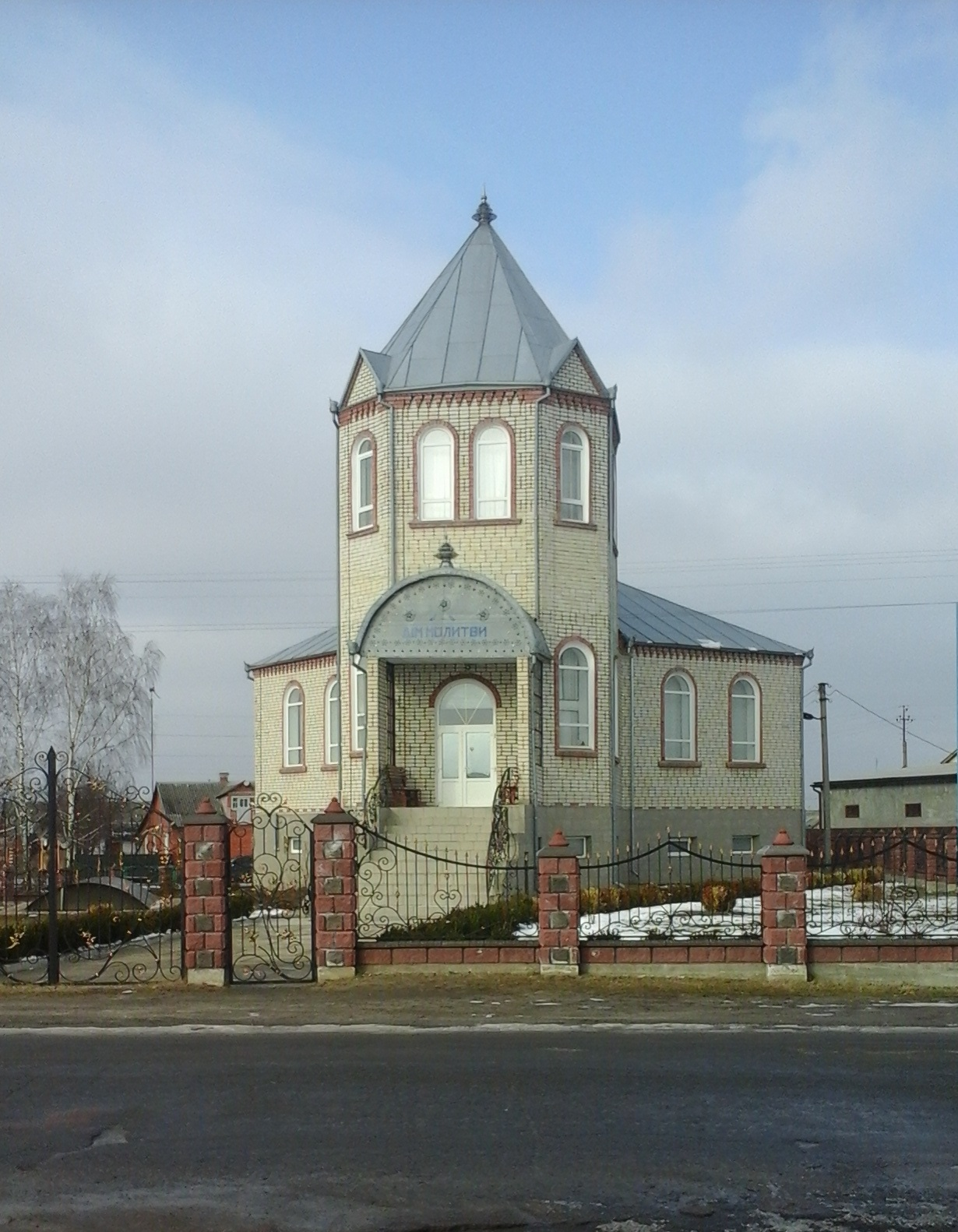
EChB Church

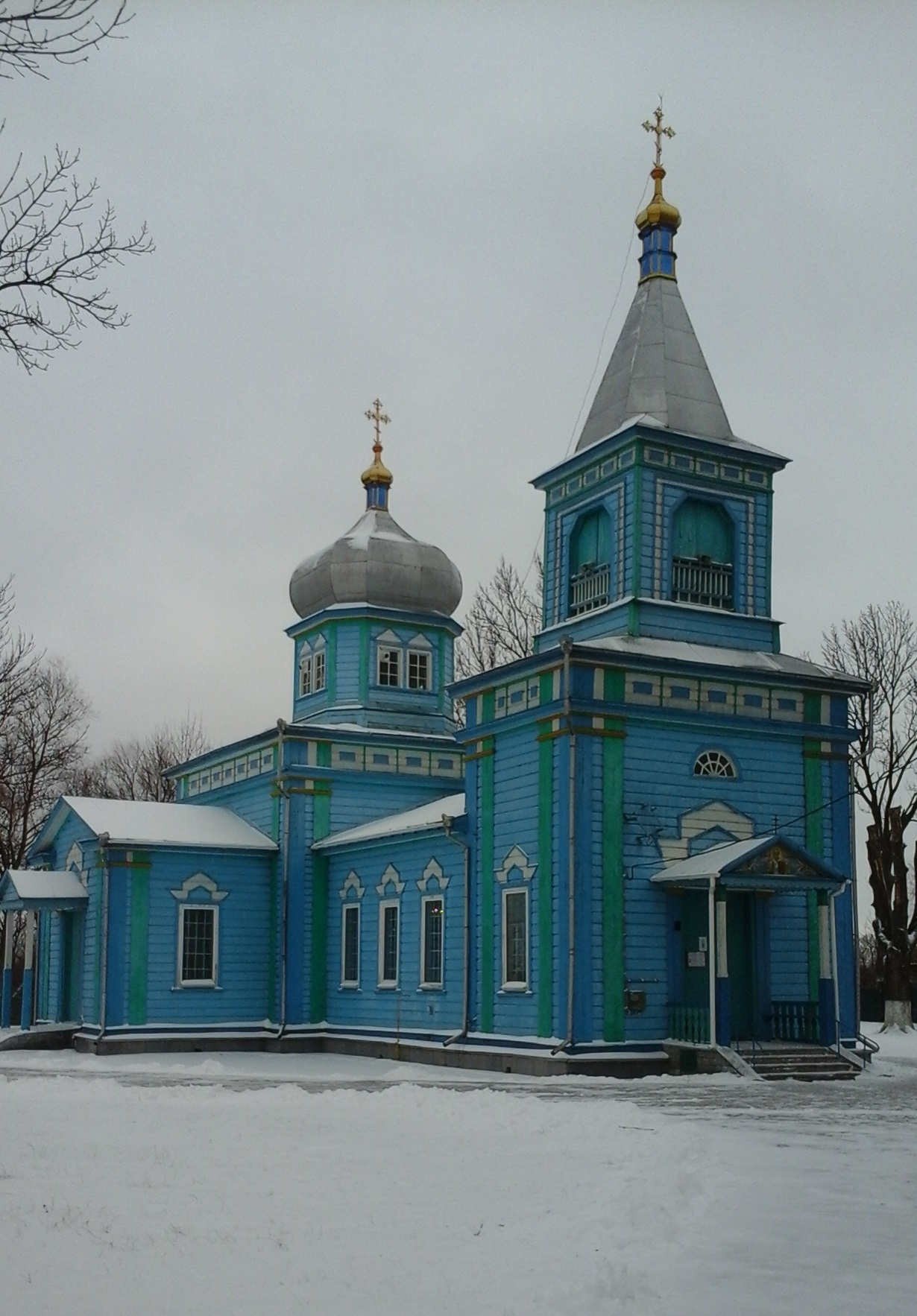
Saint Nicholas Church

Dubrovytsia (Ukrainian: Дубровиця [dʊˈbrɔwɪtsʲɐ]; Polish: Dąbrowica; Yiddish: דומברוביצא, romanized: Dombrovitsa) is a city in Rivne Oblast, Ukraine. It was the administrative center of Dubrovytsia Raion until the raion was abolished in 2020. It is the site of the now ruined Jewish shtetl of Dombrovitza. Population: 9,343 (2022 estimate).

Among the most notable historical landmarks in the city are a rococo Roman Catholic church founded in 1740 by Kazimierz Pniewski and two Orthodox churches: one founded in 1861 by Ignacy Plater (whose manor until 1917 was located in Worobin, some 3 kilometres north of the city) and the other built in 1872. Until the Holocaust the city also had three synagogues.

== Geography ==
Dubrovytsia is located upon the Horyn river in the historical region of Volhynian Polesia.

== History ==
Initially one part of the Kyivan Rus Turov-Pinsk Principality, during the late 12th century Dubrovytsia became the centre of a separate fiefdom. Its princes took part in wars against Cumans and Mongols, including the Battle of Kalka in 1223. During the latter half of the 14th century Dubrovytsia became part of the Grand Duchy of Lithuania and came under control of the Holszanski family. In 1571 it was transferred as dowry to prince Andrey Kurbsky. During the Great Northern War the local wooden Church of John the Baptist was destroyed by troops of Charles XII of Sweden. Among notbale people who visited or lived in Dubrovytsia during the 19th century were Napoleon Orda and Nadezhda Durova.

Although in modern times part of Rivne Oblast, Dubrovytsia was historically not part of Volhynia but rather Land of Brest. It was not until 1805 that it was administratively attached to Volhynian Governorate of the Russian Empire, along with many other lands formerly belonging to now-partitioned Poland.

In 19th century Dąbrowica was a notable centre of commerce, with a number of factories and manufactures serving the local market. It was also notable for its college run by Piarist monks, established in 1695 by Jan Dolski. Although the Piarist convent was dissolved in 1832 in the aftermath of the November Uprising, the school continued to exist until it was closed by Soviet authorities in 1939, following the joint Soviet and German invasion of Poland. Among its alumni were Cyprian Godebski, Alojzy Feliński and Łukasz Gołębiowski.

During World War I and the two years following it, the town passed hands many times between various powers including the Bolshevik Russian army, the Polish Democratic Republic army, local Militia (Bolokhovists), national Ukrainian forces led by Petliura, the German army and allied Hetman authorities, a local rebel army (which included all four ethnicity groups: Jews, Poles, Ukrainians and Germans) and others.

The town was owned by a Polish noble family, the Pliater brothers, who were murdered by the farmers as part of the socialist revolution on November 22, 1918. A younger brother survived, but moved away. The town was declared under communist (Bolshevik) self-rule. The Ukrainian army under Symon Petliura took the town for two days.

During the Polish rule the cooperative movement developed in Dubrovytsia. A local football team was active during the 1930s. In 1931 the town's population reached the number of 7,000 inhabitants. In September 1939 the Soviets took over the town, in accordance with the Molotov–Ribbentrop Pact. Ukrainian Insurgent Army led resistance against the Soviet regime in the area until 1947.

Under the Soviet rule Dubrovytsia functioned as a river port and hosted a cotton factory. Motoball competitions became a point of pride for locals In 1983 the city celebrated its 800th anniversary, but following a historical revision, in 2005 the millennium of Dubrovytsia's history was marked with festivities. In independent Ukraine Dubrovytsia is known as a centre of illegal amber production.

== History of the Dubrovytsia Jews ==
A large Jewish population thrived at the center of town, owning many of the stores and houses there, in what was called the Dombrovitza shtetl. Jews also owned the timber cutting factories, one of the major industries in the area.

=== World War I and the aftermath ===
In 1915 with the withdrawal of the Polish army of Nikolai, trains with Jewish refugees and Jewish soldiers reached the town, and the synagogues were used to host many of them. Until 1917 the 83rd division of the Polish Democratic Republic stayed in town, expelling many of the Jews from their homes, and annexing their houses.

During the Russian revolution, the Jews were accused of siding with the communists, against the "white Russians" and the Poles, who claimed national sovereignty.

In March 1918 the remnants of the 83rd division of the now deserted army joined forces with Polish militants and began rampaging and killing Jews in the villages around Dubrovytzia. The Jews of the town organized a self-defense team, and during the gathering of the militia with local farmers for a major planned lynch attack, detonated a large bomb in the town market square. Later the head of the militia was caught and imprisoned by the self-defense team. A German army unit took over the town, although Germany had signed a peace agreement and the war supposedly had ended.

In 1919, a mass hanging of Jews from towns nearby in the forest by "Bolokhovist" anti communist Polish and Russian soldiers took place, but the town itself was spared. In 1920 Jews were repeatedly harassed and some killed when the town passed hands back and forth between the Russians and Poles, at one time changing hands three times in one day. Each of the three armies (black, white and red) killed Jews confiscated property and accused the Jews of being loyal to their enemy. During the attack of the 'Petliura forces' in 1919, the Jews fled the town to the nearby Wiesuzk Jews, after hearing of a massacre of some 2000 Jews at Pruskurov. Four townsmen were killed including the ritual butcher, and one woman was killed in Wiesuzk by the Patliura militia. In October 1920, anti communist Bolkhovist (Polish and Russian) militia attacked the Wiesuzk Jews killing many, but were repelled from Dubrovytsia by the Polish major and his army residing in the town.

In 1937 on the Jewish holiday of Shavuot, the Polish establishment backed by the police forced the Jews to paint the house fronts and rebuild public parts of the fences within 48 hours. Some of the poorer Jews were beaten.

=== World War II and the Holocaust ===
In September 1939, with the Soviet takeover, trainloads of refugees reached the town, and were again accommodated in the Jews homes and the synagogues. Jewish and Christian refugees were fed equally in the town's Jewish learning house.

During the 2nd world war the Jews of Dąbrowica went through a year of horrific events, beginning on a Tuesday in June 1941, with the Ukrainian population blowing up the Hassidic synagogue, catching 500 of the prominent Jews in town and gathering them in preparation of a welcoming ceremony for the German army. These Jews were tortured, had their beards torn off, and a few were killed. A short while later the town became part of a German supported Ukrainian self-rule. Under the Ukrainian police, the Jews were sent to forced labor, working with manure, and cutting wood, while their property and possessions were taken from them. A Judenrat was established and a Ghetto. Decrees were given to give in large amounts of gold, fur, and shoes. The Jews of the town assembled trying to keep up with the demands, in makeshift workshops. Jews were told to turn over any good looking daughters, were beaten for refusing to do so, and young girls were kidnapped. The Judenrat was eventually all killed except one man who escaped to the forest. Some of them were burnt alive.

At some time during that year more than 300 Jewish women with their children reached the town from Dwid-Gordok, after the men were all taken to dig defense trenches. A group of men from Dąbrowica investigated and discovered that the men were shot and buried in the trenches, but did not pass this information on to the refugees.

On November 6, 1941, two woman survivors of the massacre of 17,000 Jews at Rowno (Rivne, Ukraine), crawling away after being buried alive, reached Dąbrowica. A short while later a 35-man Gestapo unit entered the town, some of them participants at the Rowno Massacre. A delegation of Jewish rabbis and leaders met the Gestapo, who seemingly were willing to receive money, furniture and food allowing the Jewish population to live. 35 Jews most of them youth were held in prison and tortured. Food for the Jews was rationed down to 800 grams of bread per week per person.

Around April 1942 a Ghetto was established in the town for its 4327 Jews. In response to a plea by the Jewish leadership, the Germans allowed for a larger Ghetto than originally planned. The establishment of the Ghetto and response to the plea were seen as a token for German non lethal plans with the Jews. All gold was to be delivered to the Germans, and the punishment for a Jew holding gold was death. The two old rabbis brought in all their gold, laying an example before the rest of the community, in hope that the Germans would not have further claims. Jews from neighboring villages were forced into the Ghetto as well. During the deportation, the neighbors snatched the Jews' belongings and openly told the refugees that they would not abide by property agreements that they had made with them. The main synagogue was closed and public prayers were not allowed.

57 Jewish policemen guarded the Ghetto mostly collaborating with the Germans, and an antagonism developed between the Judenrat (Jewish committee) and the Jewish population.

Evidence has been gathered that psychologists and other experts were sent to the town, to see to it that the Jewish population complies with the German decrees without revolting.

==== Ghetto liquidation ====
A notice was put up calling all Jews to assemble on the second day of Shavuot the Jewish holiday of Pentecost at the cemetery. The main synagogue was opened for prayer on the first day of the holiday, and the Jewish speaker for the German rule explained that it is only for a head count. The Jews were sent home.

In the last three months of Ghetto, the Germans put up signs that Jews had poisoned the wells. Christian posters called for the demise of the Jews who were the cause for the fall of Egypt, Babylon, Assyria, Greece, Chmelnitzki and Petliura.

50 Jewish children returning from forced labor were found with potatoes in their pockets and beaten. Testimony about the massacre of 65 Jewish slave workers from Refalovka at Chestorisk, shot after the first train crossed the bridge they had just finished building, reaches Dubrowica, and about the mass murder of 500 Jews the remnants of Ghetto Pohost, rounded up at Moroczna. Special agents were sent in to the Ghetto to calm the residents and contest the rumors that the Jewish of Kuritz had been killed.

Two weeks before the end, the Jews of Dubrowica learned of the massacre in death trenches of all the Jews of the nearby Rozhichecz, many of them buried alive. Again an agent was sent to disprove the rumors, and claim that the Rozhichecz massacre never happened.

The unit of Ukrainian militia in Dubrowica had participated in the massacre of Jews at Rozhichecz, Kobel and other places, two weeks before. One week before, some of the policemen intended to shoot Jewish forced labor workers coming back from the forest. The policemen were supposedly punished by the German commander, giving the Jews an extra false sense of security.

After a week of enlisting, on Tuesday evening, the 25 of August 1942, a night of almost full moon, three days of the Dubrovytsa Jews' deportation began. A truck with armed German soldiers reached the Ghetto along with a large group of Ukrainian militia men, who surrounded the Ghetto.

Several Jews committed suicide. During the night loud singing and dancing was heard from Ukrainian owned houses in the town. Several failed breakouts ensued. Some 20 or 30 Jews were able to reach the forest that night. One man was shot. Most were caught and imprisoned.

On the morning of the 26th of August, about 4300 Jews marched up to the Judenrat headquarters. 40 German soldiers with white gloves kept the order, setting the Jews in groups according to alphabetical order of their last names. Hundreds of Ukrainian armed militia men stood along the way. A large crowd of Ukrainian citizens with wagons stood at the gate, waiting to take part in the looting. The Judenrat and Jewish police assembled next to the Germans.

Suddenly there was a deathly silence. Shmuel the Yellow's voice is heard: "Rothenberg! Ask the Germans what they are going to do with us!"

The Gestapo commander steps forward, straightens, pulls out one of his own hairs and calls out to Rothenberg: "Not one hair from your heads will fall. None of you here now will be hurt in any way. All the Jews of the region are being gathered in Sarney, we have built their giant warehouses, and are missing working hands. We'll bring you all to Sarney. We'll also bring those who tried to escape from the Ghetto tonight to Sarney, and publicly hang them there."

Happiness encompassed us all. People saw this as a miracle. My mother hugged and kissed me along with brothers and sisters... (Yitzhak Figlestein, Felt on my own flesh, Domrowica Memorial Book, page 218)

The (non-Jewish) chief of the Ukrainian militia spoke Yiddish, quoted verses from the bible, and told the Jews that they would receive "the full redemption", and would be transferred to a larger and better Ghetto.

The first few groups of Jews reached the train station and were stuffed into windowless cattle cars. The rest of the groups realized this was a death trap, and began running away. Shots were heard inside the train station, and the march disassembled. Many of the escaping Jews were shot, or killed by Ukrainians when found. 800 Jews escaped and reached Ghetto Wiesock. They were murdered two weeks later when that Ghetto was liquidated. The trains took the Jews to Serney where they were immediately shot in trenches prepared for them. About 250 Jews escaped to the forest. No more than 50 of them survived the war.

=== Partisans and refugees ===
Seventeen of the Dubrowica Jews who survived the forest reached Israel and testified in a book about their subsequent experience.

Jews who had escaped the town, from the town of Sernik or from the nearby villages, and that were hiding in the forests, were being exposed to the Germans by the local farmers, in return for two kilograms of salt per head.

Ten Jewish survivors organized as a small band in the swamp area nearby. With knives, they were able to force a farmer to hand over a Russian shotgun, and with it they armed themselves with more guns. Their raids were done at night, and caused the Germans to believe that a large armed Jewish force of communist Partisans was acting nearby. They also threatened the local population if they would assist in turning in Jewish refugees. Following heavy fighting against the Ukrainian militia staying at one of the farms in the town, the German troops avoided entering the town.

Ukrainian militia attacked any local people who assisted Jews in any way. A Polish doctor and his whole family were murdered, as were many others. Jews continued to be hunted down, if not under a Partisan group. They were also killed in higher proportions than other nationalities among the partisans, in many cases by fellow antisemitic partisans. Some of the partisan commanders had committed atrocities and had participated in the mass murder of civilian Jews.

During this time there are reports of many atrocities commenced by the local Ukrainians, when finding or when approached by Jewish refugees asking for help. A group of Jews had cold water poured on them and after freezing to death were set on the main road, standing there for over a month. In other cases children crushed the head of an old man, and a family watched as another was scalped alive.

By March 1944 the Russian army captured the region. The Jews decided not to return to the village, not wishing to meet with their hateful neighbors, and instead gathered in Refaowka, a former Jewish town whose Jews were all slaughtered. 200 Jewish refugees from the whole area assembled in the town, and began ritual Jewish life, in defiance of the antisemitic calls, still prevalent even after the German defeat.

Ilya Ehrenburg wrote his famous work after visiting Dubrovytsia and speaking with the locals. He had never met the Jewish survivors from the town, and was not told the continuation of the story.

== Notable people ==
- Georges Charpak, a Nobel laureate in physics, was born in Dubrovytsia in 1924.
