= Sarny Raion =

Subdivision of Rivne Oblast, Ukraine

Sarny Raion Сарненський район
- Raion
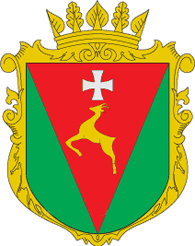
- Flag Coat of arms

- Coordinates: 51°16′45″N 26°38′35″E
- Country: Ukraine
- Oblast: Rivne Oblast
- Established: 1939
- Admin. center: Sarny
- Subdivisions: 11 hromadas

Area
  - Total: 1,970 km^{2} (760 sq mi)

Population (2022)
  - Total: 212,212
  - Density: 108/km^{2} (279/sq mi)
- Time zone: UTC+02:00 (EET)
  - Summer (DST): UTC+03:00 (EEST)
- Area code: 380-3264
- Website: http://www.rv.gov.ua/sitenew/sarnensk Sarny Raion

Sarny Raion (Ukrainian: Сарненський район) is a raion in Rivne Oblast in western Ukraine. Its administrative center is the town of Sarny. Population: 212,212 (2022 estimate).

On 18 July 2020, as part of the administrative reform of Ukraine, the number of raions of Rivne Oblast was reduced to four, and the area of Sarny Raion was significantly expanded. The January 2020 estimate of the raion population was 104,037 (2020 est.).

== Geography ==
The area of the district is 6212.7 km^{2}.

The district borders the Varash and Rivne districts of the Rivne Oblast, as well as the Zhytomyr Oblast of Ukraine and Belarus.

The relief of the district is flat, partly lowland, covered with pine and oak forests. There are large areas of swamps. Varash Raion has reserves of silt, sapropel, peat, rovno amber.

The larger area of the district is located in the Volhynian Upland. Varash Raion is located in the basin of the Pripyat River. The Horyn and Sluch rivers flow in the region. The climate of the region is moderately continental: winter is mild (in January -4.4 °, -5.1 °), with unstable frosts; summer is warm (in July +18.8 °), not hot. Most often, comfortable weather is observed in the summer months. The formation of stable snow cover is noted in the second decade of December. Rainfall 550 mm per year.

The Pochayiv Landscape Reserve and the Rivne Nature Reserve are located on the territory of the district.

== Communities of the district ==
Number of settlements 168. Number of cities – 2 (Sarny and Dubrovytsia). The district includes 11 territorial communities. The territories of the district include Berezivska rural, Vyrivska rural, Vysotska rural, Dubrovytska urban, Klesivska rural, Mylyatska rural, Nemovytska rural, Rokytnivska rural, Sarnenska urban, Starosilska rural, Stepanska rural territorial communities.

== Economy of the district ==
The district grows grain and industrial crops, mainly rye and potatoes. The district has only 20% of agricultural land. Livestock breeding is represented by cattle and pig breeding. The district's industries include logging and woodworking, mining (granite, gabbro, amber mining), food and light industry. The largest industrial city is Sarny, which has enterprises of machine building, food and light industry. There is a glass factory in Rokytno. Black-smoked ceramics Black-smoked ceramics are produced in Rokytno.

In order to promote the development of partnership relations, Partnership Cooperation Agreements were signed between the Sarny City Council and the municipalities of Nowy Dwor-Gdański (Republic of Poland), Gmina Długolenko (Republic of Poland), and Hennef (Federal Republic of Germany).

== Transport ==
The national highway of Ukraine pass through Sarny Raion European route E373 ( Lublin - Kovel - Kyiv). This road passes through Sarny. Railways through the district run to Kovel and Kyiv.

== Bibliography ==
- Національний атлас України/НАН України, Інститут географії, Державна служба геодезії, картографії та кадастру; голов. ред. Л. Г. Руденко; голова ред. кол.Б.Є. Патон. — К.: ДНВП «Картографія», 2007. — 435 с. — 5 тис.прим. — ISBN 978-966-475-067-4.
- Коротун І.М., Коротун Л.К. Географія Рівненської області. – Рівне, 1996. – 274 с
