= Rivne Oblast =

Oblast (region) of Ukraine

Rivne Oblast Рівненська область
- Oblast
- Rivnenska oblast
- Flag Coat of arms
- Nickname: Рівненщина (Rivnenshchyna)
- Interactive map of Rivne Oblast in Ukraine
- Coordinates: 50.74°N 26.35°E
- Country: Ukraine
- Administrative center: Rivne

Government
  - Governor: Oleksandr Koval
  - Oblast council: 64 seats
  - Chairperson: Andriy Karaush

Area
  - Total: 20,047 km^{2} (7,740 sq mi)
  - Rank: Ranked 22nd

Population (2022)
  - Total: 1,141,784 ▼
  - Rank: Ranked 20th
  - Density: 56.955/km^{2} (147.51/sq mi)

GDP
  - Total: ₴ 89 billion (€2.3 billion)
  - Per capita: ₴ 77,599 (€2,000)
- Time zone: UTC+2 (EET)
  - Summer (DST): UTC+3 (EEST)
- Postal code: 33xxx-35xxx
- Area code: +380-36
- ISO 3166 code: UA-56
- Raions: 16
- Cities: 11
- Settlements: 16
- Villages: 1003
- HDI (2022): 0.722 high
- FIPS 10-4: UP19
- NUTS statistical regions of Ukraine: UA83
- Website: www.rv.gov.ua

Rivne Oblast (Ukrainian: Рівненська область, romanized: Rívnensʹka óblastʹ), also referred to as Rivnenshchyna (Ukrainian: Рівненщина, romanized: Rívnenščyna), is an oblast in northwestern Ukraine. Its administrative center is Rivne. The surface area of the region is 20,100 square kilometres (7,800 mi^{2}). Its population is: 1,141,784 (2022 estimate).

Before its annexation by the Soviet Union during World War II, the region was part of the Second Polish Republic's Wołyń Voivodeship following the Polish–Soviet War. Previously it was part of the Volhynian Governorate.

The Rivne Nuclear Power Plant is located in the oblast, near the city of Varash.

== Geography ==
The region is located almost in the middle of the historical region of Volhynia which is indicated on its coat of arms with a white cross on a red background. Volhynia was completely partitioned after the Soviet occupation of Poland in September 1939 and divided between three oblasts, Volyn, Rivne, and Ternopil, with some additional eastern portions in Zhytomyr Oblast.

The relief of the region varies, its northern portion lies in the Polesian Lowland, while its southern is located within Volhynian Upland. The highest hills known as Povcha Upland reach over 350 meters. The main water artery of the region is river Horyn, while northwestern area also reaches Prypiat. Big portions of the oblast covered in woodlands. It also has a great deal of such excavated minerals like amber and basalt. In recent years (2016–2017) there were reports of illegal extraction of so called Rovno amber in the area.

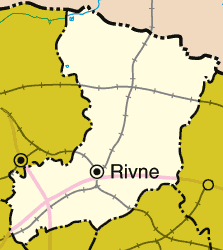
Detailed map of Rivne Oblast

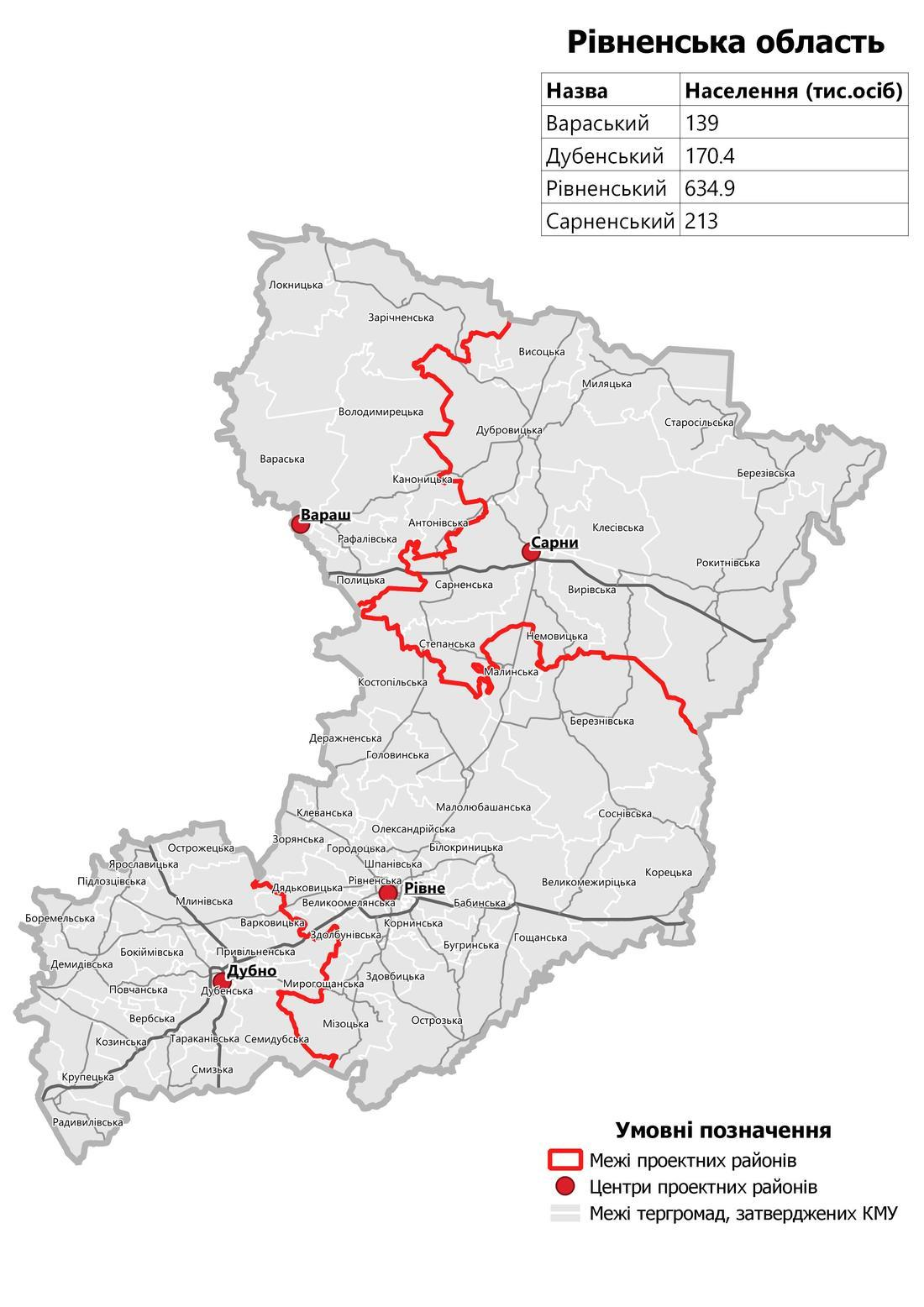
Subdivisions of Rivne Oblast

== Administrative divisions ==
On 19 July 2020, the number of raions was reduced to four. These are:

1. Dubno Raion (Дубенський район), the center is in the city of Dubno;
2. Rivne Raion (Рівненський район), the center is in the city of Rivne;
3. Sarny Raion (Сарненський район), the center is in the city of Sarny;
4. Varash Raion (Вараський район), the center is in the city of Varash.

Until 19 July 2020, Rivne Oblast was administratively subdivided into 16 raions (districts) as well as 4 cities (municipalities) which are directly subordinate to the oblast government: Dubno, Varash, Ostroh, and the administrative center of the oblast, Rivne.

Raions of the Rivne Oblast
In English	In Ukrainian	Administrative Center
Berezne Raion	Березнівський район Bereznivs'kyi raion	Berezne (City)
Demydivka Raion	Демидівський район Demydivs'kyi raion	Demydivka (Urban-type settlement)
Dubno Raion	Дубенський район Dubens'kyi raion	Dubno (City)
Dubrovytsia Raion	Дубровицький район Dubrovyts'kyi raion	Dubrovytsia (City)
Hoshcha Raion	Гощанський район Hoshchans'kyi raion	Hoshcha (Urban-type settlement)
Korets Raion	Корецький район Korets'kyi raion	Korets (City)
Kostopil Raion	Костопільський район Kostopils'kyi raion	Kostopil (City)
Mlyniv Raion	Млинівський район Mlynivs'kyi raion	Mlyniv (Urban-type settlement)
Ostroh Raion	Острозький район Ostroz'kyi raion	Ostroh (City)
Radyvyliv Raion	Радивилівський район Radyvylivs'kyi raion	Radyvyliv (City)
Rivne Raion	Рівненський район Rivnens'kyi raion	Rivne (City)
Rokytne Raion	Рокитнівський район Rokytnivs'kyi raion	Rokytne (Urban-type settlement)
Sarny Raion	Сарненський район Sarnens'kyi raion	Sarny (City)
Volodymyrets Raion	Володимирецький район Volodymyrets'kyi raion	Volodymyrets (City)
Zarichne Raion	Зарічненський район Zarichnens'kyi raion	Zarichne (Urban-type settlement)
Zdolbuniv Raion	Здолбунівський район Zdolbunivs'kyi raion	Zdolbuniv (City)

== Demographics ==
Historical population
Year	Pop.	±%
1970	1,047,605	—
1979	1,120,812	+7.0%
1989	1,169,687	+4.4%
2001	1,173,304	+0.3%
2011	1,152,526	−1.8%
2022	1,141,784	−0.9%

According to the 2001 Ukrainian census, ethnic Ukrainians accounted for 95.9% of the population of Rivne Oblast, ethnic Russians for 2.6%, and ethnic Belarusians for 1.0%.

Rivne is one of the regions with the highest birth rate in all of Ukraine. However the birth rate is not uniform across Rivne, with raions like Ostroh having extremely low birth rates (9.7 per 1000) and other raions like Rokytne Raion having extremely high birth rates (24.0 per 1000).

=== Vital statistics by raion (2008) ===
Raion	Births	Deaths	Natural Growth	BR	DR	NGR
Rivne Oblast	17,089	16,245	844	14.8	14.1	0.07%
Rivne	2,906	2,208	698	11.7	8.9	0.28%
Dubno	465	558	-93	12.2	14.7	-0.25%
Varash	654	243	411	16.2	6.0	1.02%
Ostroh	149	184	-35	9.7	11.9	-0.22%
Bereznivskyi	1,288	896	392	20.6	14.3	0.63%
Volodymyretskyi	1,233	844	389	20.3	13.9	0.64%
Hoshchanskyi	428	765	-337	11.8	21.1	-0.93%
Demydivskyi	176	294	-118	11.5	19.2	-0.77%
Dubenskyi	588	856	-268	12.7	18.5	-0.58%
Dubrovytskyi	704	807	-103	14.4	16.5	-0.21%
Zarichnenskyi	587	572	15	16.7	16.3	0.04%
Zdolbunivskyi	742	1,052	-310	13.0	18.4	-0.54%
Koretskyi	481	690	-209	13.5	19.4	-0.59%
Kostopilskyi	957	954	3	15.0	14.9	0.01%
Mlynivskyi	515	750	-235	13.1	19.1	-0.60%
Ostrozkyi	355	517	-162	12.1	17.6	-0.55%
Radyvylivskyi	486	702	-216	12.7	18.3	-0.56%
Rivnenskyi	1,253	1,343	-90	14.2	15.2	-0.10%
Rokytnivskyi	1,267	698	569	24.0	13.2	1.08%
Sarnenskyi	1,855	1,312	543	18.7	13.2	0.55%

According to statistics the population of Rivne Oblast Central Office at 1 January 2013 is 1,156,900 people.

In 2012, it increased by 2612 people. This was due to natural increase 4014 people at the same time reduce the migration of the population -1,402 people.

Compared to 2011, the volume of natural growth increased by 485 people. Natural movement of the population in 2012 was characterized by an increase in fertility and mortality, compared to 2011. In 2012, the number of births in the region was 619 more than in 2011.

Fertility in rural areas is higher than in urban areas (18 per cent against 13.5 per cent). The total fertility rate for 2012 was 15.9.

Compared to 2011, the mortality rate in 2012 rose from 12.3 to 12.4 deaths per 1,000 inhabitants. The mortality rate in rural areas is 1.6 pa za higher than in urban areas.

=== Language ===
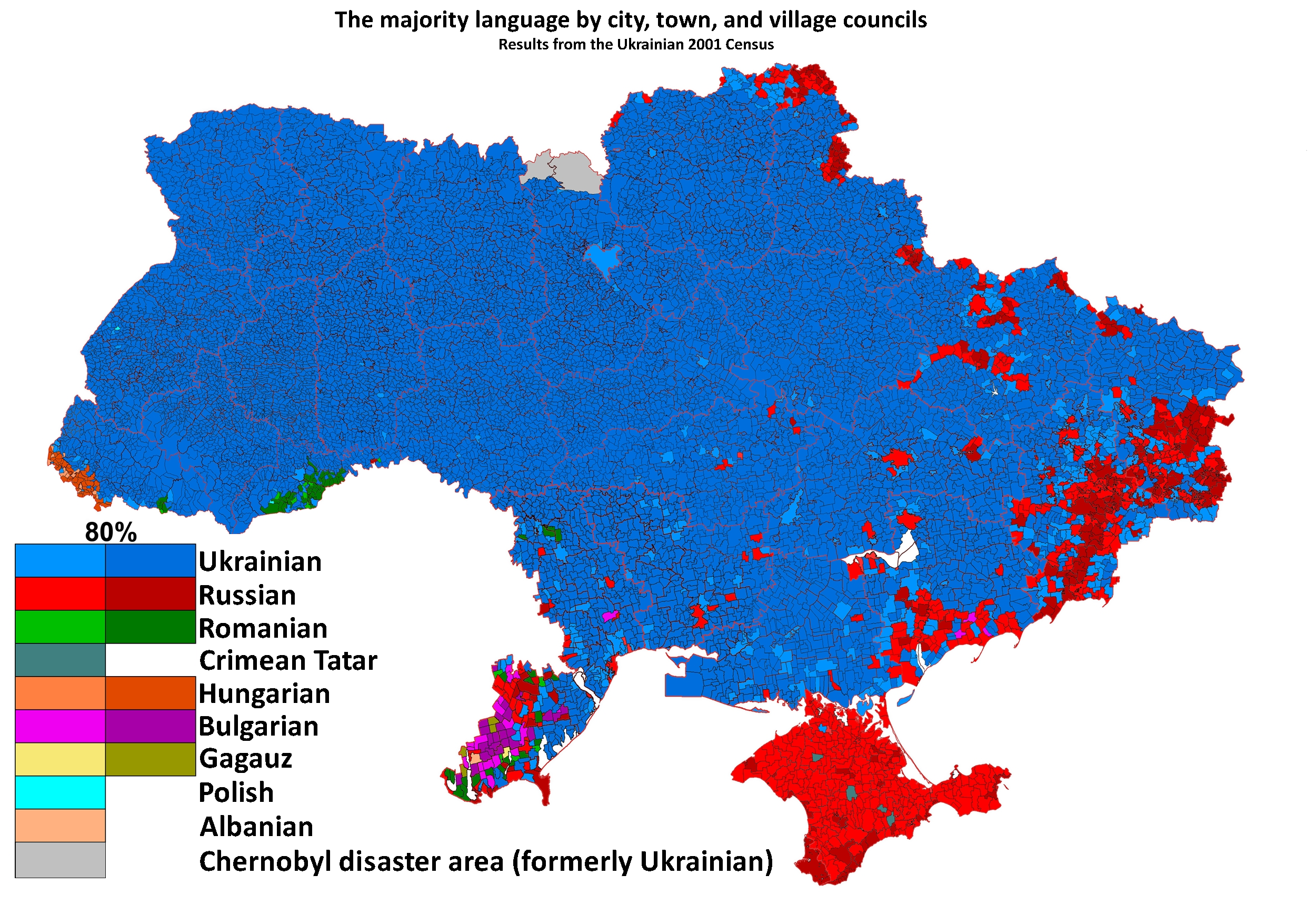
According to the 2001 Ukrainian census, Ukrainian was the native language for over 97% of Rivne Oblast's population: it was the dominant language in all of the city, town, and village councils of the oblast.

The Russification of Ukraine carried out during the Soviet era had little to no effect on the Rivne Oblast: the share of Ukrainian-speakers in the region in 1959—1989 fluctuated around 92—95%. Native language of the population of Rivne Oblast according to the results of population censuses:

	1959	1970	1989	2001
Ukrainian	92.6%	94.3%	94.0%	97.0%
Russian	5.2%	5.1%	5.6%	2.7%
Other	2.2%	0.6%	0.4%	0.3%

Native language of the population of the raions and cities of Rivne Oblast according to the 2001 Ukrainian census:

	Ukrainian	Russian
Rivne Oblast	97.0%	2.7%
City of Rivne	92.1%	7.5%
City of Dubno	96.2%	3.3%
City of Varash	90.4%	9.3%
City of Ostroh	97.3%	2.4%
Berezne Raion	99.5%	0.4%
Volodymyrets Raion	99.3%	0.6%
Hoshcha Raion	99.1%	0.8%
Demydivka Raion	99.2%	0.6%
Dubno Raion (in pre-2020 borders)	99.2%	0.6%
Dubrovytsia Raion	98.9%	0.7%
Zarichne Raion	99.4%	0.4%
Zdolbuniv Raion	97.3%	2.4%
Korets Raion	99.2%	0.7%
Kostopil Raion	98.5%	1.4%
Mlyniv Raion	99.2%	0.7%
Ostroh Raion	99.3%	0.6%
Rivne Raion (in pre-2020 borders)	98.3%	1.5%
Rokytne Raion	99.3%	0.4%
Sarny Raion (in pre-2020 borders)	98.2%	1.6%
Radyvyliv Raion	99.1%	0.7%

Ukrainian is the only official language on the whole territory of Rivne Oblast.

According to a poll conducted by Rating from 16 November to 10 December 2018 as part of the project «Portraits of Regions», 87% of the residents of Rivne Oblast believed that the Ukrainian language should be the only state language on the entire territory of Ukraine. 8% believed that Ukrainian should be the only state language, while Russian should be the second official language in some regions of the country. 3% believed that Russian should become the second state language of the country. 2% found it difficult to answer.

On 2 May 2024, Rivne Oblast Council approved the «Oblast Targeted Programme to Ensure Comprehensive Development and Functioning of the Ukrainian Language as the State Language in All Spheres of Public Life in Rivne Oblast for 2024—2026», the main objectives of which are to strengthen the positions of the Ukrainian language in various spheres of public life in the oblast and to Ukrainianize the refugees from other regions of Ukraine.

According to the research of the Content Analysis Centre, conducted from 15 August to 15 September 2024, the topic of which was the ratio of Ukrainian and Russian languages in the Ukrainian segment of social media, 93.0% of posts from Rivne Oblast were written in Ukrainian (86.3% in 2023, 85.2% in 2022, 53.6% in 2020), while 7.0% were written in Russian (13.7% in 2023, 14.8% in 2022, 46.4% in 2020).

After Ukraine declared independence in 1991, Rivne Oblast, as well as Ukraine as a whole, experienced a gradual Ukrainization of the education system, which had been Russified during the Soviet era. Dynamics of the ratio of the languages of instruction in general secondary education institutions in Rivne Oblast:

Language of instruction, % of pupils	1991— 1992	1992— 1993	1993— 1994	1994— 1995	1995— 1996	2000— 2001	2005— 2006	2007— 2008	2010— 2011	2012— 2013	2015— 2016	2018— 2019	2021— 2022	2022— 2023
Ukrainian	93.6%	96.6%	97.8%	98.4%	99.0%	99.7%	99.9%	99.96%	99.97%	99.99%	100%	100%	100%	100%
Russian	6.4%	3.4%	2.2%	1.6%	1.0%	0.3%	0.1%	0.04%	0.03%	0.01%	—	—	—	—

According to the State Statistics Service of Ukraine, in the 2023—2024 school year, all 164,344 pupils in general secondary education institutions in Rivne Oblast were studying in classes where Ukrainian was the language of instruction.

=== Age structure ===
0-14 years: 19.7% ▲ (male 116,507/female 110,834)
15-64 years: 68.2% ▼ (male 385,381/female 402,566)
65 years and over: 12.1% ▼ (male 45,796/female 94,724) (2013 official)

=== Median age ===
total: 35.2 years ▲
male: 32.8 years ▲
female: 37.5 years (2013 official)

== Points of interest ==
The some listed historic-cultural sites were nominated for the Seven Wonders of Ukraine.

- Ostroh Castle
- Trinity Monastery (Korets)
- Dubno Castle
- Spring of St. Anna
- Tarakaniv Fort
- Novomalyna Castle
- Rivne Nuclear Power Plant
- Battle of Berestechko Field
- Narrow-gauge railway (Tunnel of Love)

== Nomenclature ==
Most of Ukraine's oblasts are named after their capital cities, officially referred to as "oblast centers" (Ukrainian: обласний центр, translit. oblasnyi tsentr). The name of each oblast is a relative adjective, formed by adding a feminine suffix to the name of respective center city: Rivne is the center of the Rivnens'ka oblast' (Rivne Oblast). Most oblasts are also sometimes referred to in a feminine noun form, following the convention of traditional regional place names, ending with the suffix "-shchyna", as is the case with the Rivne Oblast, Rivnenshchyna.

Before 1992, under the policy of Russification, the region was officially known under its Russian name of Rovno Oblast.

== Gallery ==
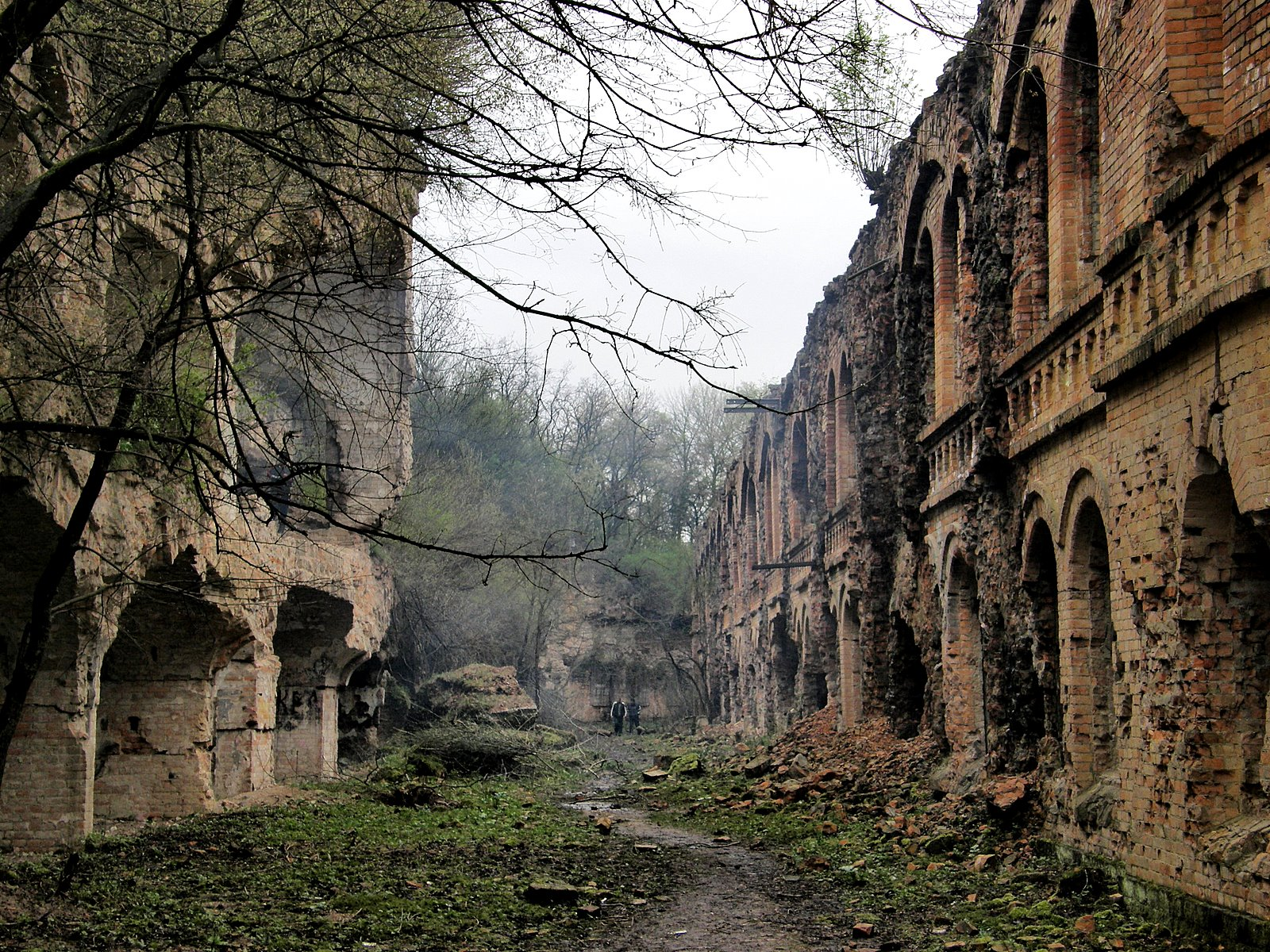
Tarakaniv Fort

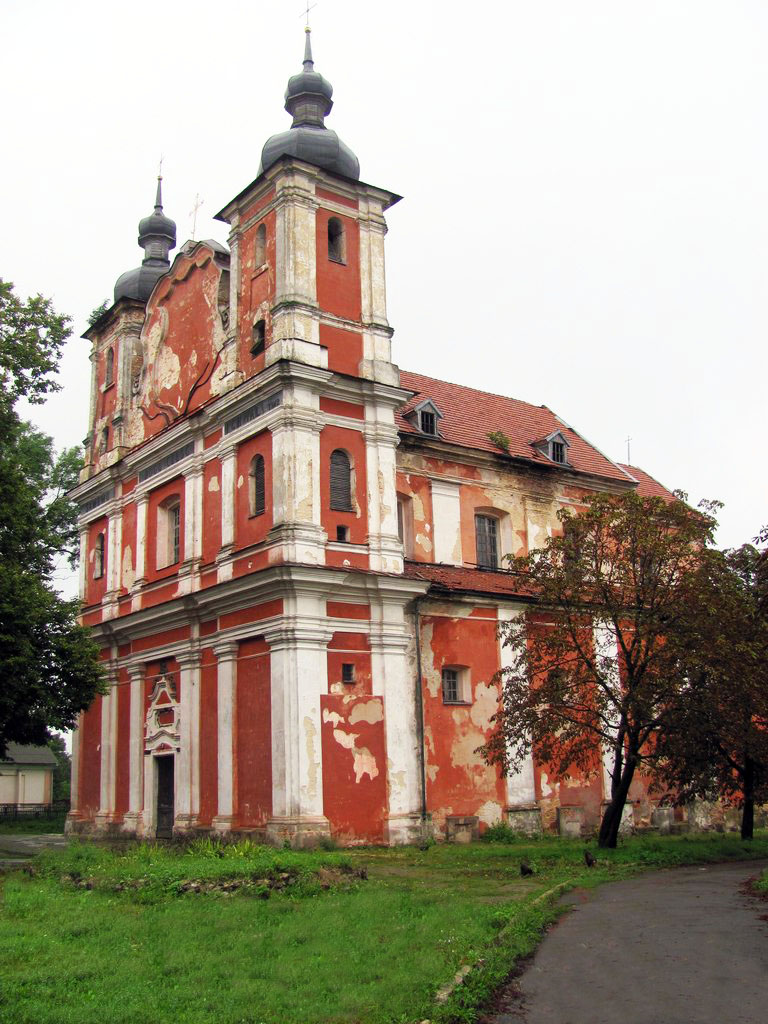
Church of St. John the Baptist in Dubrovytsia

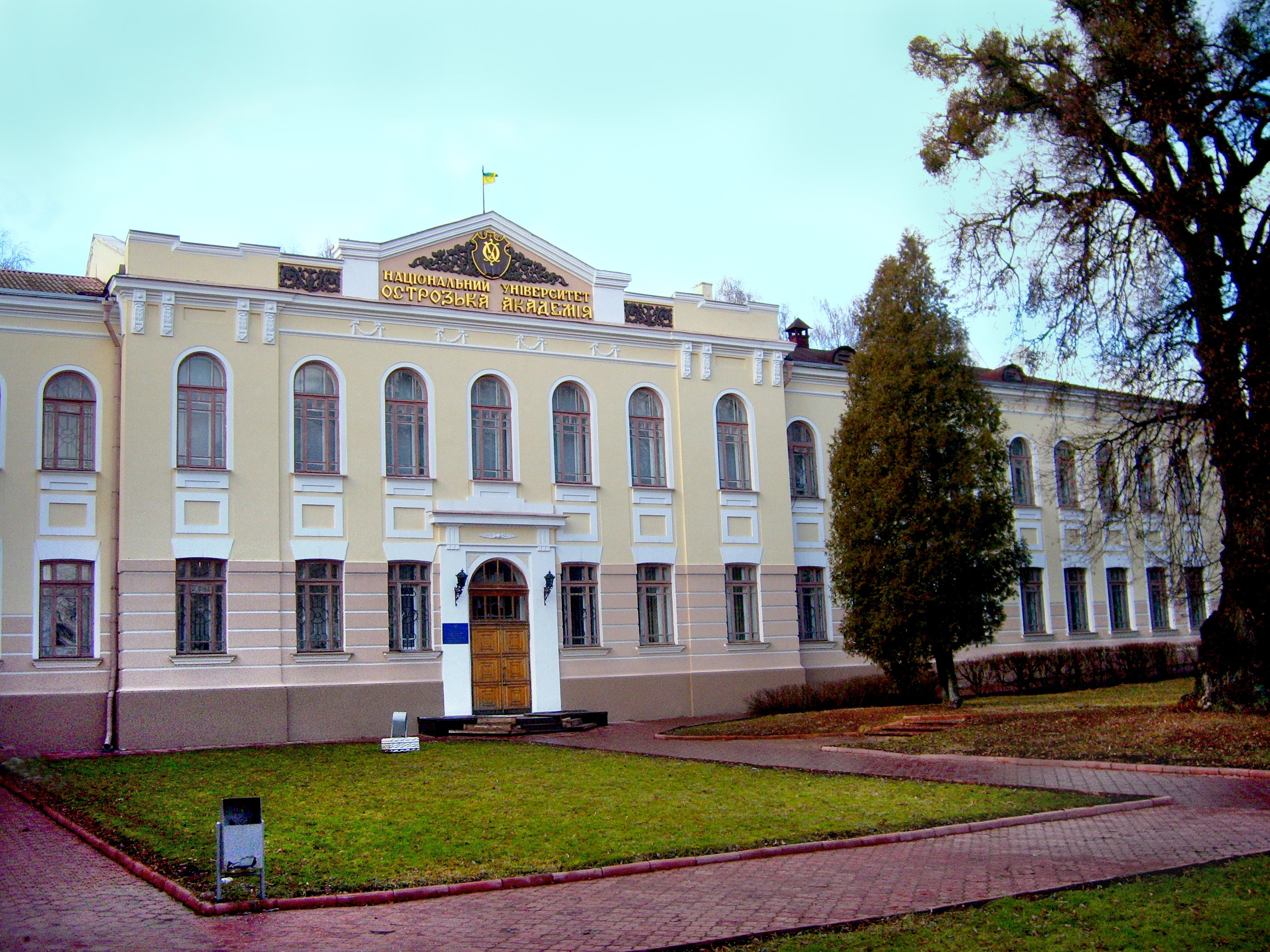
Ostroh Academy

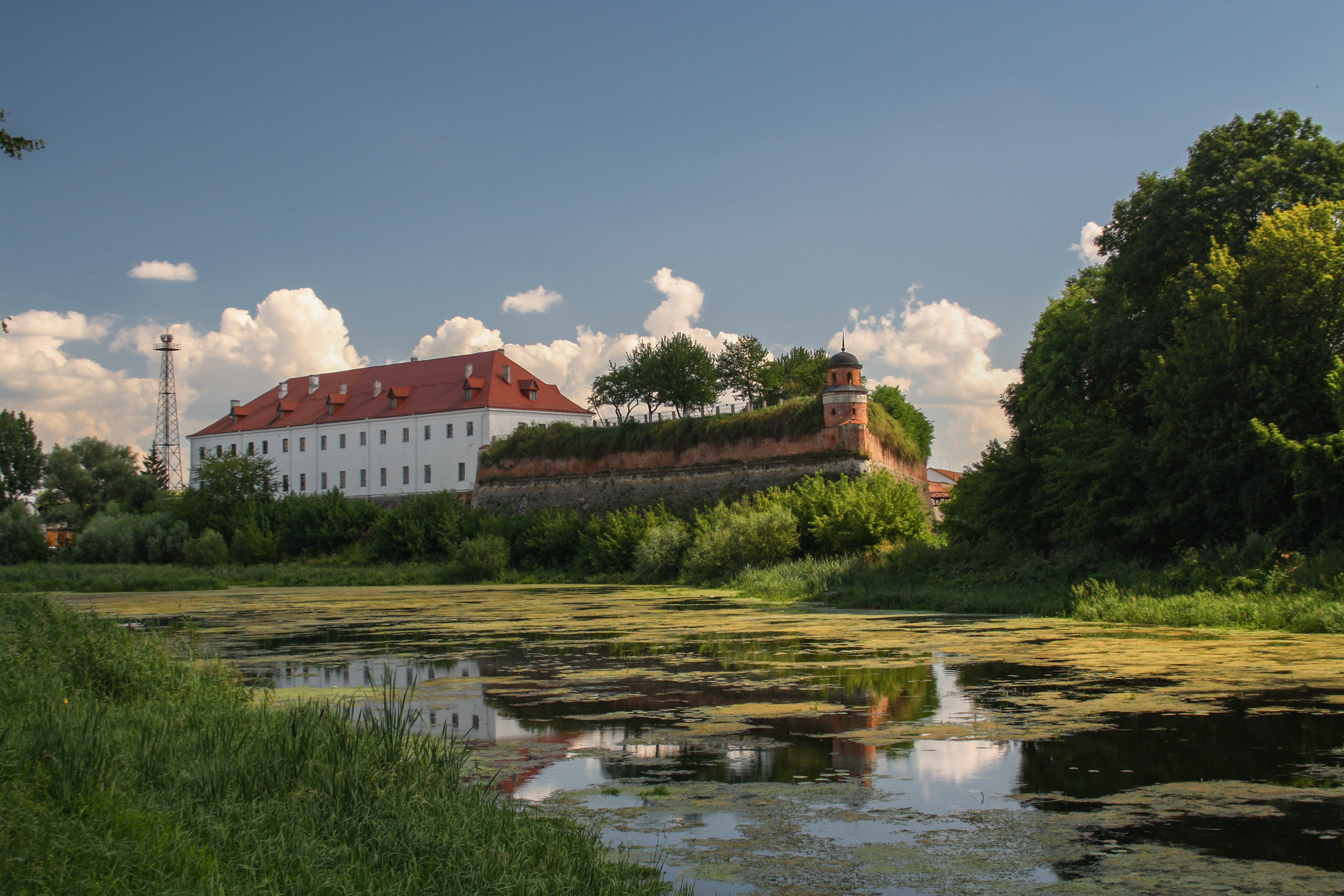
Dubno Castle

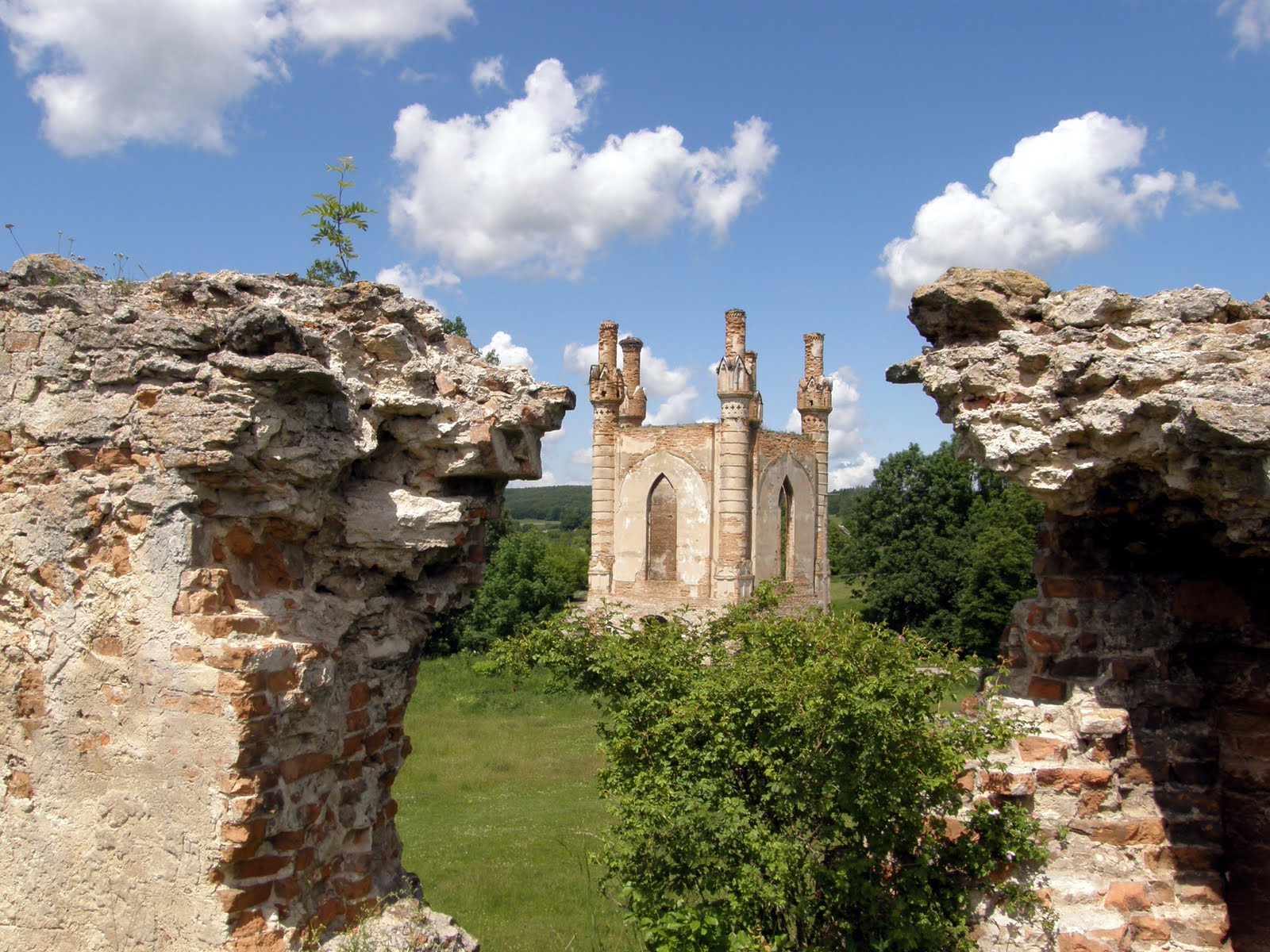
Chapel of Novomalyn Castle

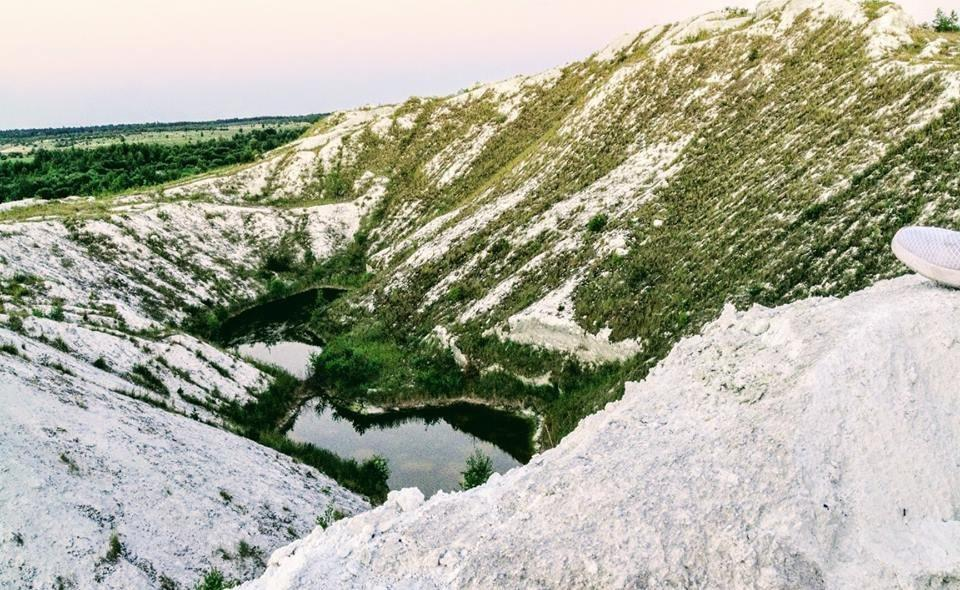
Phosphate mountains

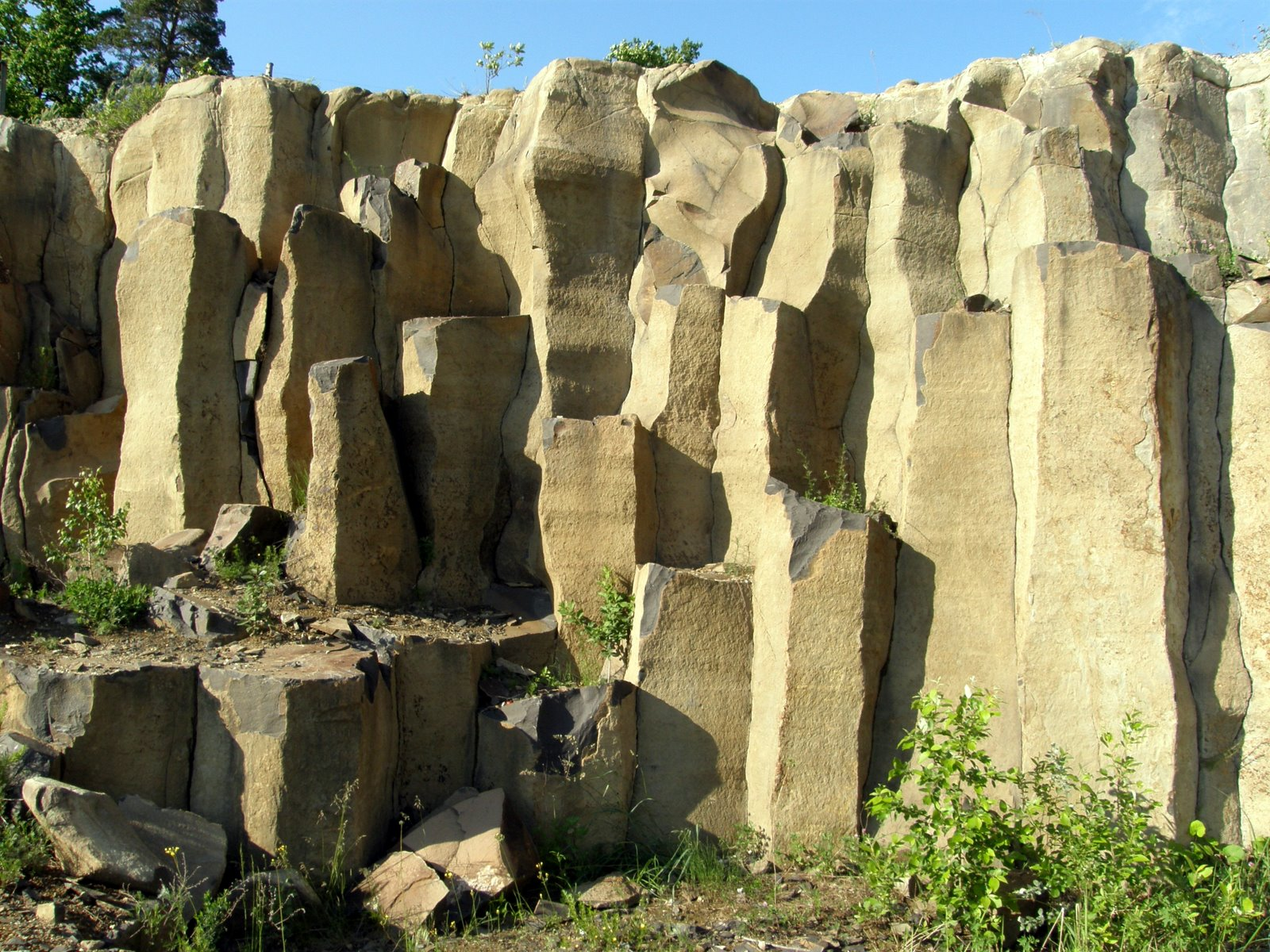
Basalt Columns

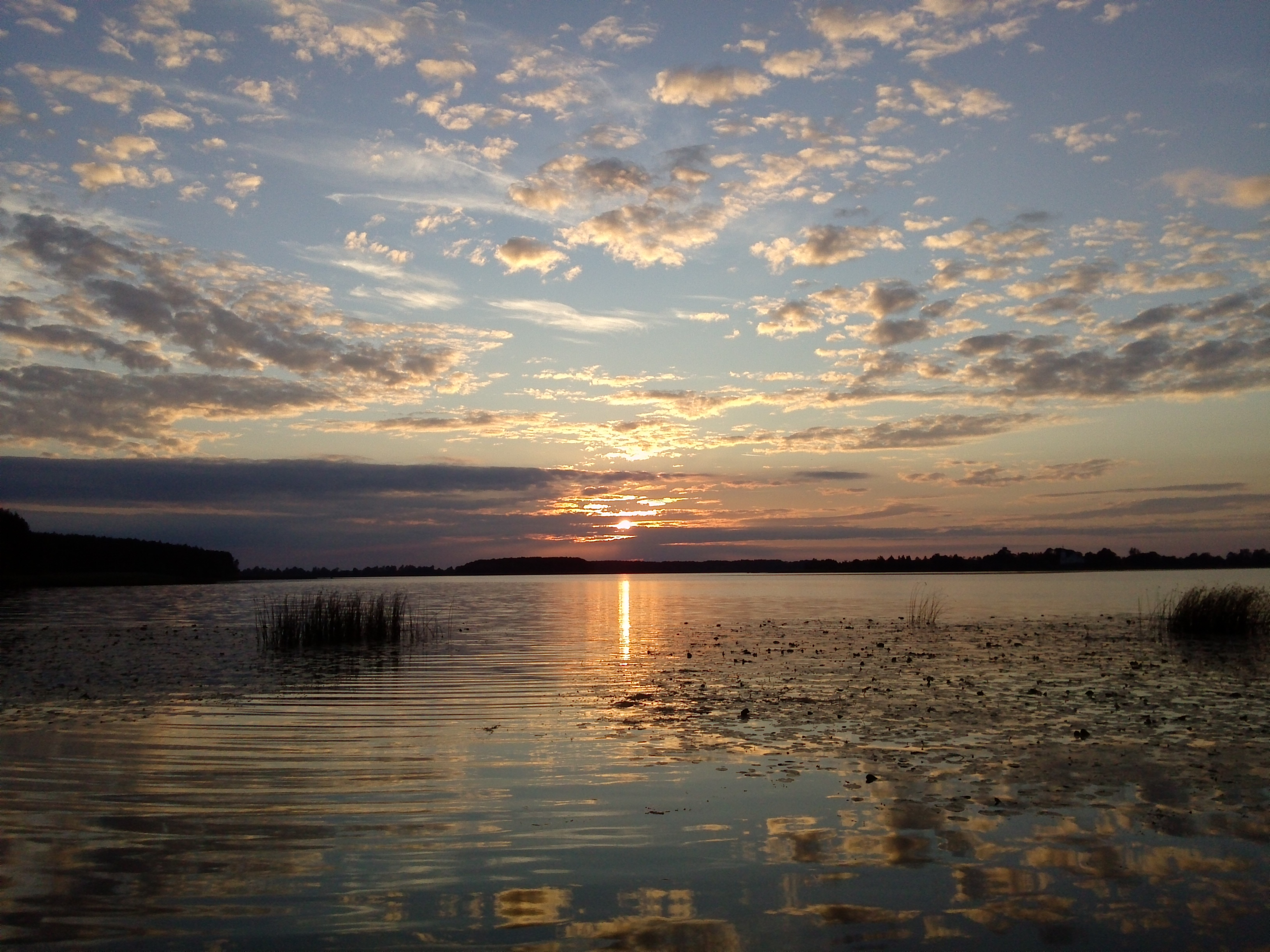
Nobel National Nature Park

== See also ==
- List of villages in Rivne Oblast
- Subdivisions of Ukraine
