= History of the Jews in Brody =

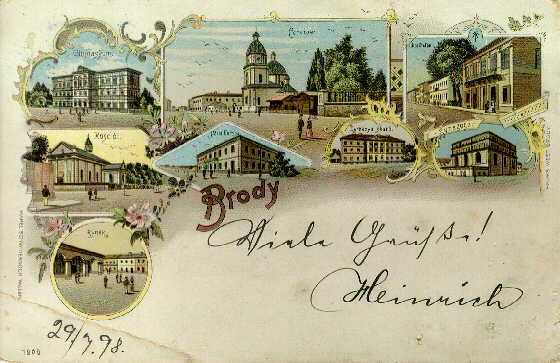
Antique postcard of Brody in 1898 (during Austro-Hungarian rule), at that time a primarily Jewish city

The Jewish community of Brody (a city in the Lviv region of western Ukraine) was one of the oldest and best-known Jewish communities from western Ukraine (and formerly of the Austrian Empire / Poland up to 1939) until it perished in the Holocaust in 1942–1943.

While today it is a non-significant town in Western Ukraine, only serving as the administrative center of the Brodovsky rayon, in the northeastern fringe of the Lviv oblast, Brody once stood out as a Jewish cultural and economic center in the area.

After Lviv, Brody was the second largest city in Eastern Galicia and had the largest proportion of Jewish residents (88%), in contrast to other areas in the region.

Even the remote tiny forest village of Stanislavchyk, 15 km northeast of the city and surrounded by hip plantations, presumes of a Jewish heritage as it had many Jews living there, most likely moving from Brody.

An old desolate Jewish graveyard in Stanislavchyk bears witness to its vivid Jewish past.

== History ==
The earliest mention of Brody as a settlement takes place in the medieval Teaching of Vladimir Monomah to the Children. The city is said to have served twice as a meeting place of Duke Vladimir II Monomah and Volhynian Duke St. Yaropolk Izyaslavich in 1084 and 1086, the prior date formally figuring as the beginning of Brody's history in local historiography.

=== Austro-Hungarian rule ===
For a long time, Brody was one of the greatest trade centers of the whole Austro-Hungarian Empire, being referred to as the Trieste of the continent. Known since the 12th century, Brody had been almost entirely inhabited by Jews short after, which earned it the nickname of the Galician Jerusalem.

During Austrian rule in Galicia, the northeastern fringe of the Empire passed just a few kilometres from Brody, which lied between the borders of the two main empires of the time, i.e. the Austrian and the Russian one.

Until 1664, Brody was a "sub-kahal" of Lviv, i.e. under the administration of the Lviv Jewish Community. From the 17th century on, it became an important center of Jewish trade (esp. horse fairs) and artisans.

=== 18th century ===
In 1756, Brody was home to 7191 Jews, reaching 14.718 in 1880 (out of 19.977 of total town inhabitants).

In 1779, Brody was granted the status of a free city, i.e. it was tax-free. As it could trade with all European countries, new ideas and foreign culture were brought about, making it an intellectual center. The main commercial hub of Eastern Galicia, Brody was connected to major European trade centers such as Leipzig, and its commercial turnover surpassed that of the whole province of Galicia.

At the end of the 18th century, the Jewish Enlightenment started in Eastern Galicia in three cities: Lviv, Ternopil, and Brody. As such, Austrian authorities associated enlightened Jews with the free city of Brody. The governor of Galicia noted that, while Orthodox, Hasidim and Karaite Jews lived in the region, enlightened Jews could only be found in Brody.

=== 19th century ===
During the 19th century, Brody was the second-largest city in Eastern Galicia (after Lviv (Lemberg)), with the highest proportion of Jewish population (88%) among Eastern European cities. Few other European cities had a nearly exclusively Jewish population; only Berdychiv (in Russian Ukraine) and Thessaloniki in Greece to a certain degree.

Its "sister city" over the Russian side of the border was Radyvyliv, just 9 km east of Brody, which had a similar role to that of Brody on the Russian side.

In 1827, out of a total number of 11,718 Jewish merchants and shopkeepers in all Galicia, 1,134 (about 10%) lived in Brody. The same year, Brody was home to 36 Jewish brokers and 9 Jewish bankers. Jews owned 163 (93%) large commercial and industrial enterprises in Brody (175 in total).

Among the six largest Jewish commercial firms in Brody in 1849 were M. Nathanson, with 40,000 florins in the capital, Yidl Nathanson and Nirenstein with 30,000 florins each.

=== World Wars ===
Brody was destroyed twice; once during World War I, and again in World War II in 1944.

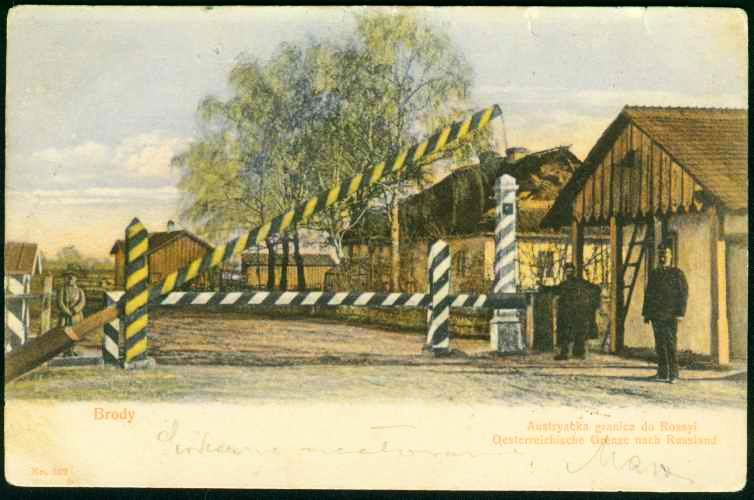
Border passage between Austrian and Russian empires at Brody in 1905.

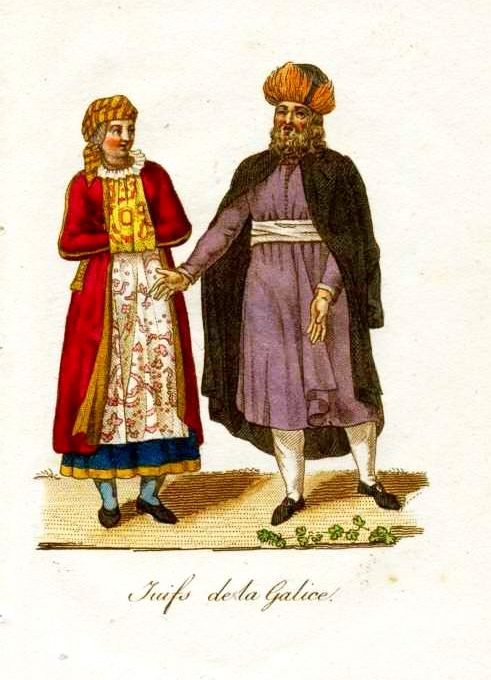
Traditional dress of Galician Jews (Brody area). Postcard of 1821.

== Hasidism ==
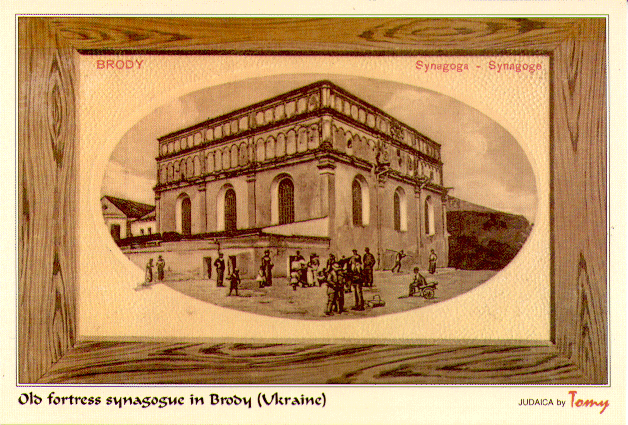
Old fortress synagogue of Brody. Historical prewar postcard.

Besides its commercial importance, the city was of a great Talmudic and scholarly importance, where Talmudists and Hasidim fought and coexisted. The famous sages of Brody Kloiz were "the lions and tigers in the Torah and in piety".

Around 1720, it was home to the founder of Hasidism, Baal Shem Tov (aka Besht or Baalshem). Dubnow gives a vivid account of the Brody phase in Besht biographical history. Baal Shem Tov arrived in Brody at the age of 20 when his religious outlook was taking shape,.

Dubnow states that Besht settled in some village by Brody. He engaged in the profession of melamed, teacher of the youngsters.

As he was not well trained in the Talmud, Simon Dubnow presumes he was an elementary level teacher instructing children in prayer, reading and translating Torah. Despite his insignificant position, he soon earned respect and fame in Brody.

His honesty, non-passionate meek character, humbleness and life gained wisdom attracted the attention of the surrounding common people, heading to him for consultations and court advice. Among the suppliants was Ephraim Kutover, father to Brody rabbi Gershon Kutover.

The seeker was so pleased with Besht's decision that after getting to know him better and learning he is a widower, he offered him his divorced daughter in marriage.

Shevhei ha-Besht explicitly mentions the existence of pre-Besht era Hasidic circle in Brody. The source mentions Brody as the place where Besht was first made a Rabbi of local Hasidim: "...the conventicle of great pietists Hasidim in that city Brody...who made him their rabbi."

Though Besht was at first rejected by Brody's kabbalistic brotherhood as he did not match the traditional qualifications to be admitted, he eventually earned himself the respect of his fellows thanks to his charisma.

Besht had high regard for those "great Hasidim" of the Brody circle and it seems quite plausible that the Baalshem intended to organise a similar fellowship of his own or wanted to unite with a brotherhood of Brody kind.

However, the married couple was later expelled of Brody and settled in Kuty, some 100 km to the south at the foothills of the Carpathians. The kabbalistic fellowship of Brody did not act on social scale.

It was a closed circle of pietists who used to gather at Brody Study Hall, founded around 1736, and did not spread their activities beyond there.

=== Ban on Hasidism (1772) ===
As Hasidism grew as a social phenomenon, a ban was issued in Brody, forbidding a great number of Hasidic practices and only allowing prayer in the Lurianic rite. Among the forbidden practices were the Hasidic shehitah (slaughter by Talmud forbidden honed shehitah knives / geschleefeene) that irritated the Misnagdim.

Brody native Gershon Kutover (secretary to Baal Shem Tov and his brother-in-law, who settled in Palestine later) defended his employer when sages were preparing to anathematise him, in which they eventually succeeded.

The proclamation is included in the pamphlet Zamir arisim ve-harevot surim. Brodyites expressed their concern that the new heresy can bring a catastrophe on whole Polish Jewry discrediting God's name in the same way as Frankists and Sabbateans did. Brody sages feared that the sect was particularly dangerous as there was no high authority to interfere after dissolution of the Great Council of Fours Lands. Brody declaration caused great furore on the tsaddiks when learning of it, who in their turn became even more active in a fight for a believer, as a cause of it.

== Haskalah movement ==
Brody played a leading role in the Galician Haskalah movement, with many important figures living in Brody.

Israel ben Moses Ha-Levi of Zamość Lefin, teacher of Moses Mendelssohn, chose Brody to be his final seat, and died there in April 1772.

Israel Lefin spent part of his life in Berlin, but persecution from Orthodox rabbis forced him to seek another home. Thus, he returned to Galicia and settled in Brody, where he lived in great poverty. He was an outstanding Jewish astronomer, author of the Nezah Yisrael, dedicated to the astronomical and geometrical passages in both Talmuds (published in Frankfurt-on-Oder in 1741) and of Arubbot ha-Shamayim, treaties on ancient and modern astronomy.

In his memoirs, Avrom Ber Gotlober gives a vivid account of the importance Brody had on the spreading of the Age of Enlightenment ideas in Russia and Ukraine proper:

The Jews who lived in the large Galician cities were the first to be enlightened by the light of the wisdom of the RaMbeMaN [acronym for Moses Mendelssohn] and his followers. On the account of their travels they would travel to various Russian cities and bring with them at the same time the spices of their enlightenment and knowledge… In this regard, Brody especially excelled, being a city of scholars and Maskilim who used to do business mostly with Russia. Everywhere that a merchant of Brody would come, he would excite the youth with his fine speaking – their eyes opened…and they would take up education...

Among the maskilim living in Brody in the 19th century, were Dov Ber Blumenfeld, Isaac Erter, and Joshua Heschel Schorr. The latter published periodical He-Halutz (the Pioneer) in Brody during 1852–1889.

Adolf Stand, president of the Galician Zionists, was elected to the Austrian parliament from the Brody district in 1907. However, in 1911, he was forced to quit his deputy mandate due to the political intrigues initiated by the assimilationist Heinrich Kolischer.

Because of the highly commercial and internationalised nature of Brody's Jewish community, it was one of the most Germanised Galician cities. In May 1784, the first Josephinian style German Jewish Normal school opened in Brody. In 1815, the first Jewish Realschule was established with German as the main language for instruction.

Brody was home to the acclaimed Royal Gymnasium of Archprince Rudolf (today, Brody Gymnasium), which was once attended by the known Jewish writer Joseph Roth. Max Landau taught there as well, Roth being his student. The modern monument next to the school commemorates several outstanding figures that studied here. It is shaped in a rainbow of head figures associated with the establishment. Along with Roth's, it includes the sculptures of three Ukrainian cultural notabilities: painter Trush, folklorist Rozdolsky, scientist Shchurat, and writer Tudor.

=== The issue of national identity in the 1880s ===
The issue of Jewish national identity, the problem of the Jewish national language and their recognition in the legal system of Habsburg monarchy was reflected in the Brody school case and tribunal dispute from 1880.

Since 1867, Austrian monarchy recognized the equal status of all nationalities and languages used in the large multicultural state.

The 19th paragraph of the new Austro-Hungarian Constitution (from the 21st of December, 1867) guaranteed equal national rights to all the ethnic group in the empire. In Brody, where more than ¾ of the population was Jewish (out of ca. 20.000 of inhabitants), there was only one public school teaching in German and two schools with Polish as instruction medium.

The Galician Regional School Council (Landesschulrat) in Lviv allowed opening of two more schools refusing however the wish of Brody town commune to have German for instruction language in these new schools. Council was only willing to allow them to be in Polish. In the end, in 1880 Brody town commune appealed with the complaint to the Tribunal of the State (Reichsgericht) in Vienna, after unsuccessful attempts to defend their claim at the Galician Landeschulrat and the Ministry of Religion and Science.

In the State Tribunal Brody commune was represented by Dr Heinrich Jaques (1831–1894), who published the memorial on the situation of Jews in Austria in 1859. The tribunal referee in Brody case was Hye von Glunek (1807–1894) who concluded that the rights of Brody town commune guaranteed by the 19th paragraph of the constitution were violated what all other board members agreed to as well.

The Ministry of Education viewed Brody Israelites as not belonging to German nationality (against the views of Brody commune itself) while Brody and Galician Israelites did not want to acknowledge themselves neither to Polish nor to Ukrainian nationalities.

According to Hye, Brody Jews could not use "the guaranteed constitutional rights as for nationality and language" and either to present themselves as a separate Hebrew ethnic group different from all other Austrian minorities what Hye declined pointing at several previous bans of usage of Hebrew language in the administrative life and non-recognition of "Hebrew tribe" by Austrian legislature.

Court councillor and member of the Highest Tribunal (Oberster Gerichtshof) Pergin von Purschka considered that, "Jews only joined the language tribe (Sprachenstamm)." The two other board members, Dr Anton Rintelen and count Edmund Hartig, suggested limiting the discussion to the fact that, "Brody Jews speak German and all other issues should be set aside".

== The Jerusalem of the Austrian Empire ==
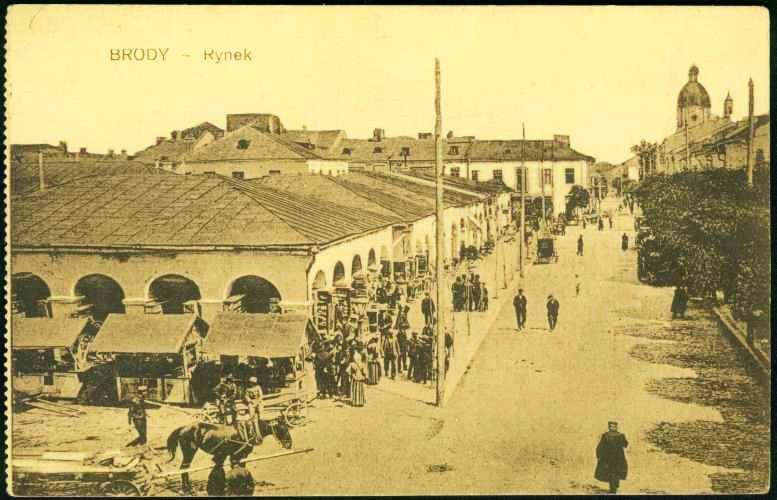
Market square of Brody (Rynek in Polish) in 1904

The name of the city derives from the Ukrainian word brid, which means 'ford' (German: Furt); changing in plural to brody 'fords'.

Kratter, contemporary of Joseph II, notes in his Briefe über den jetztigen Zustand Galiziens that Brody is the first and almost the only commercial city, where big enterprises were concentraned in the Jewish hands, except a few German trade and banking houses.

Brody's Jerusalemic association is not a sheer modern invention. Tradition ascribes this analogy to emperor Joseph II, who visited it in 1774 and presumably said, Now, it is clear why I am designated to be king of Jerusalem (one of the titles of Austrian emperors).

Joseph's stay in Brody resulted in significant consequences. In 1778 he issued a decree making Brody a free town, which quickly reflected on its development and life, marking a new prosperous era that spanned a century.

Yet, in 1774, he freed Brody from all taxes under the condition of reconstructing old houses and erecting new ones. The market square was surrounded by new stone houses with basements for storage.

== Economic conditions of local Jewry and immigration to America after 1879 ==
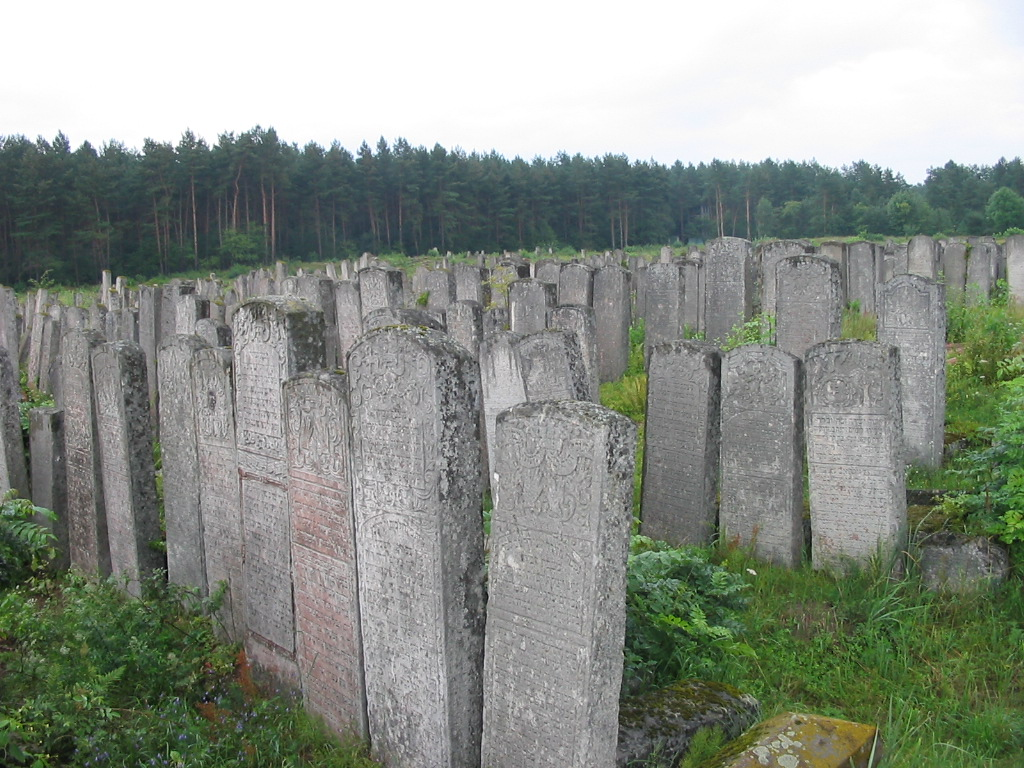
The New Jewish Cemetery of Brody numbers ca. 20.000 Jewish burials.

The Galician Jewish cultural development was directly linked to the international trade, as most of Eastern Galicia was an impoverished peasant countryside.

Notorious Russian Jewish journalist and writer Solomon Ansky, who visited Eastern Galicia to inquire about the local Jewish state of affairs at the time of the outbreak of World War I, wrote about it:

Galicia is one of the poorest regions in Central Europe, if not the poorest. It has few natural resources, few mineral deposits. The soil is not particularly fertile; the farming methods are primitive and the harvests meagre. The deeply rooted Galicians, especially Ruthenians (i.e. Ukrainians) in the eastern part are barely educated and live roughly; they are more backward than the Russian muzhik. All this has, of course, effected the economic condition of Galician Jews, who numbered between 900.000 and 1 million before the war. Even Jews in the Austrian Empire enjoy equal rights, with equal access to all professions and government jobs, while those in Galicia are very poor and unsophisticated. This is confirmed by two sets of statistics: Galicia has the highest death rate among Jews and the highest immigration to America.

The decline of Brody started in 1879, when the city lost its rights as a free commercial city. In 1880 there were 15,316 Jews in town, who formed 76.3% of the total population. Only in 11 years, the Jewish population dropped to 12,751 in 1890.

Mentioning the Galician Jewish immigration to America, interesting to note that most of these immigrants (along with their Ukrainian and Polish immigrant fellows) were impoverished economic refugees who were not in possession even of 50 dollars.

A statistical study by Szyja Bornsztejn witnesses that for the year of 1914, 53.1% of Galician and Polish Jews immigrating to the United States did not own any money at all when arriving on American soil. 39.2% had less than 50 dollars and only 7.7% owned a sum over $50.

If divided, the average sum at the hands of each Galician Jewish newcomer comprised only 22 dollars. Besides that Jewish immigration from Brody and surrounding Lviv, Ternopil and Volhyn voivodeships was among the highest in the years 1926–1929. From Ternopil province (including Brody district) it was 4.1%, from Volhyn province 7.5%, from Lviv province 9.1%, all of total Jewish population in the provinces.

== World War I events: burning and Russian invasion ==
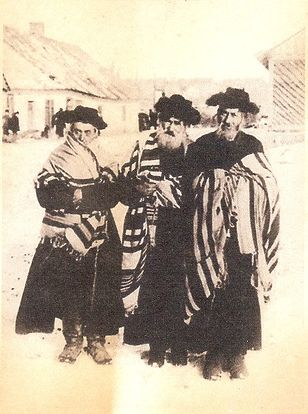
Galician Jews of neighbouring Khorostkiv during World War I in Galicia, 1917.

The key and turning point in the history of Brody was the Russian onslaught and burning of the city at the outbreak of the World War I. This drama and scope of the tragedy of these events closely echoes Josephus account of the Fall of Jerusalem, burning of the Last Temple and its siege by Titus legions. The havoc that dominated the city at that time was terrific.

Russian Jewish journalist Solomon Ansky who witnessed the Russian invasion of Brody gives this account of it:

At the start of the war, Brody's train station had gone up in flames. Now a ramshackle buffet had been set up in one of the ruins. When I entered, the place was packed with officers, who were standing at the buffet or around small tables, consuming borshch. I noticed that the soup bowls bore a Hebrew inscription that read "mazel tov", congratulations. The china had been evidently stolen from a Jewish hotel…The road to Brody was flanked by burned and desolate cottages.

In the distance we saw a broad field covered with ruins. Soon the devastated town emerged from the grey mist of an early winter morning. There were blackened chimneys and burned walls as far as we could see, visible beneath a dusting of downy snow. The town looked like the ancient, mossy remnants of Pompeii. I noticed the schorched wall of a synagogue. Above the door, some Hebrew words had survived: How awesome is this place [from Genesis 28:17]. The verse was fitting for the ruins of the house of worship and for the entire spread of the shattered neighbourhood.

Nestled among the wreckage I saw a small cottage almost embedded in the earth. It looked as if it had crouched down during the conflagration, hidden in the ground, and therefore survived. An old Jewish man was standing nearby, as poor and hunched as the cottage itself.

When he saw me and my friend in our uniforms, he whipped off his cap and bowed deeply. I went over and asked in Yiddish, "How come your cottage escaped the fire?" The old man gaped at me, then shrugged and sighed. "Perhaps a miracle… Heaven granted us a place to starve to death."

I gave him a rouble. He was so amazed he forgot to thank me. He stood motionless, gawking. We walked on among the burned ruins. I noticed something that I would see again and again: at every street corner, shiny metal signs in Russian had been nailed to the walls.

The occupiers had given every street a fancy, new name: Pushkin Street, Gogol Street, Lermontov Street, and even Turgenev Street, if I remember correctly. The irony of naming these horribly deformed street after the luminaries of Russian culture had escaped the victors: they did not realize how offensive it was to the memory of our great Russian authors...

The burning of Brody had devoured almost half of the town – several hundred exclusively Jewish houses...With its old market place, the unsigned area looked impoverished and dejected. Many stores, especially the bigger one and richer ones, were locked or boarded up…The instant…I entered the market, we were surrounded by whole army of poor, ragged, famished kids, who were begging for a kopek. Most of them were Christian, but three or four were jewish. I gave each child a few kopeks, no matter what is his religion. But the instant I handed a coin to a Jew, all Christian children began shouting at me: "Don’t give him anything! Don’t give him anything! He is a Jew! The children were joined by a Jewish beggar, a strange woman of about sixty. She wore a red dress, her grey hair was powdered, and her movements were nervous. She stood before me, grinning, her nasty, hungry eyes glaring at me, and she sort of danced a little. Then in a hoarse voice, mangling the language, she began warbling a sentimental Russian song, "Ptichka Kanareyka", dearest little canary, about a young man who sends out a canary with a greeting for his beloved. The old beggar woman's screechy voice and outlandish appearance made a terrible impression on me. I gave her some coins and tried to hurry off. But she blocked my way, taring into my eyes and squawking her horrible song. She plainly expected me to be surprised that she could sing in Russian. I was haunted for the rest of the day by the nightmare of the beggar's appearance and performance.

Strange enough, but even greater destruction wave (if we consider Holocaust in Brody) befell upon Brody also during the Russian Civil War. Brody went in flames for the second time. Isaac Babel in his "The Death of Dolgushov" describes second burning of Brody:

The curtains of battle were moving toward the city. At noon, Korochaev, in a black cloak, the disgraced commander of the fourth division, fighting alone and seeking out death, flew past us. On the run he shouted to me: "Our communications links are broken! Radziwillow and Brody are in flames!" And he galloped off, fluttering, all black, with eyes like coal. On the plain, flat as a board, the brigades were repositioning themselves. The sun was rolling along in the crimson dust.

== Jewish population in Poland ==
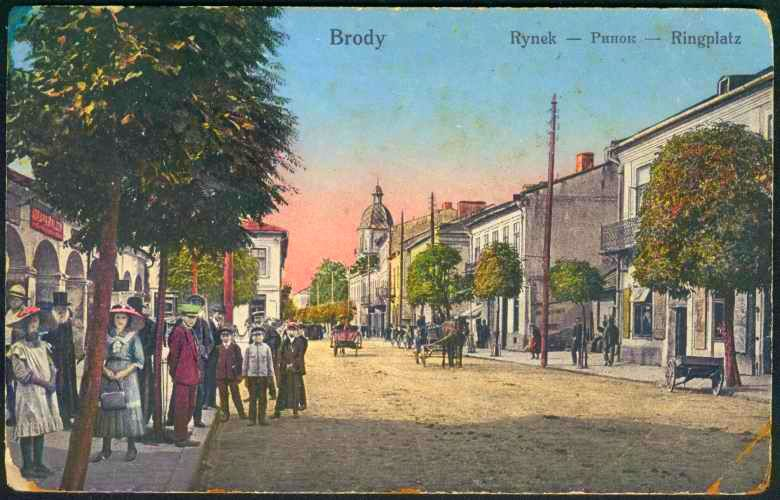
Market square of Brody in 1914. Prewar postcard.

After the collapse of the Habsburg monarchy, Western Ukrainian lands were incorporated into Poland.

According to the new administrative division, the Brody district became part of the newly created Tarnopol Voivodeship (Ternopil province) and was ruled from Ternopil, which at the time was more attractive to the Jewish population than Brody. Thus, Ternopil became home to 13.999 Jews (1931), while the number of Jews in Brody declined to 8.288.

Like the surrounding Lviv and Ternopil areas, the Brody district had one of the highest concentration of Jews in the countryside.

After the World War I, Brody was not anymore a border city hub. It lost its geo-commercial and geo-cultural value. The borders of new Poland moved further eastwards and with the Holocaust there was no more Jewish Brody, and Brody as "city" itself, because Brody was 88% Jewish city.

The following incorporation of Brody into the Soviet Ukraine and Ukrainization of the city, due to the influx of local Ukrainian peasantry from the rural areas basically into emptied (of urban Poles and Jews) Galician cities after 1944 turned Brody into a provincial town. The changes that occurred within basically 50 years are dramatic. The deeply changing character of Brody reflects and exemplifies at its best the cross-cultural historic experience of East Galician past. History of the Jews in Brody provides a demonstration of Jewish commercial and intellectual rise and decline in Eastern Galicia.

== Jewish literary figures ==
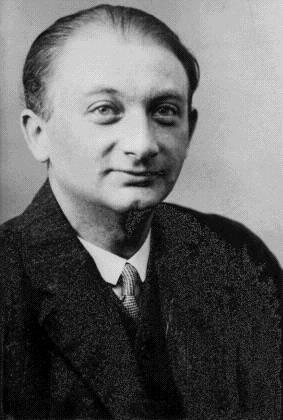
Joseph Roth (1894–1939). Jewish writer from Brody.

Well-known Jewish literary historian Marcus Landau was a Brody native.

Jacob Goldenthal, one of the most renowned Austrian orientalists, was born in Brody on April 16, 1815, and died in Vienna on December 28, 1868.

He studied at the University of Leipzig, being one of a few modern Jewish specialists on Sufism and Al-Ghazali. He issued Das Neue Zion, a monthly periodical in Leipzig (Nisan, 1845), of which only one number appeared. He edited another short-lived periodical, Das Morgenland.

Joseph Roth, famous Austrian Jewish writer, was born on September 2, 1894 in a southern part of Brody called Shvaby (after German "Schwaben"). His parents were Nahum Roth and Mariam (Grubel) Roth.

As his father died when Joseph was quite young, he was raised by his mother's family. Roth studied from 1901 to 1913 at the local public school, which used German for instruction. He later continued his studies at the Brody gymnasium.

The nostalgia for the old Austrian Brody was very strong in Roth's novels. He missed his childhood and the old Austrian lifestyle. His "March of Radetzky" showed his feelings about it as he described his Austrian epoch and the local societal life. He showed different processes that were slowly destroying the great multicultural Habsburg state.

The Austrian Gesellschaft für Literatur donated and fixed the memorial plate in honour of J. Roth in modern Brody. The inscription (in German) reads: Der Dichter Joseph Roth hat im Mai 1913 an diesem Gymnasium die Matura sub Auspicis Imperatoris abgelegt.

Brody also produced one of the most noted Israeli literary scholars, Hebrew and Yiddish writer, Knesset member, and professor of Hebrew University Dov Sadan, who immigrated to Palestine in 1925. He was a member of the staff of the Davar daily newspaper and the Am Oved publishing house.

== Role in Russian, German, Italian and Hungarian Jewish history ==
Brody played a significant role in the history of Russian Jewry as well. Galician Jewish immigrants and merchants went westwards but also eastwards. Brody was a kind of Galician "Odessa". Zipperstein, during his time as a student in Odessa, describes the immigration of Brodyites to Odessa and the role of Brody in this Galician commercial wave to the Black Sea "pearl": Brody, "the rising star east of Lemberg", was seen by Russian maskilim as Galicia's cultural center.

In Odessa we find a Brody synagogue established by Brody merchants in the 1840s.

In Leipzig, at Keilstrasse 4, is another footprint of Brody's commercial tycoons, i.e. the Brody Synagogue, the only one in Leipzig to survive the Kristallnacht because there had been "Aryan" tenants in the building's upper stories – was restored and re-consecrated. A. Yehuda (Osterzetzer) devoted a few pages on Brodyites in Leipzig in the Brody Yizkor Book.

There is also Broder Synagogue in Jerusalem, managed by an Orthodox community.

Hundreds of Jews all over the world trace their roots to Brody, and as a result, many adopted the last names Brodsky, Brodski, Brodskiy, Brodowski, Brodovsky, Brodisch (meaning "from Brody"), or simply Brody. Among them are Russian violinist Adolph Brodsky, modern American singer Chuck Brodsky, Russian American poet Joseph Brodsky, and Russian painter Isaac Brodsky.

=== Israel Zolli, rabbi of Rome ===
Israel Zolli was born in 1881 in Brody as Israel Zoller (he later changed his surname). After finishing his studies, he left Brody and settled in Trieste (modern Italy), where he became the chief rabbi after World War I while also teaching Hebrew at the University of Padua from 1927 to 1938. From 1939 on, he took the role of chief rabbi of Rome.

In early September 1943, when the Nazis entered Rome, he sought refuge in the Vatican. At the end of the hostilities he reappeared to assume his position as rabbi, but was rejected by the community.

In February 1945, he converted to Catholicism, taking the name Eugenio Maria in homage to Pope Pius XII. After World War II, he taught Semitic epigraphy and Hebrew at the University of Rome.

He is the author of a great number of works, especially on Biblical interpretation, Jewish history, liturgy, and Talmudic literature. Most were published in Italian and include Israele ("Israel", 1935), L’ebraismo ("Judaism", 1953), and autobiographical reflection Before Dawn (1954). His translation of the tractate Berakhot was published by a Catholic editorial house in 1968.

He died in Italy in 1956.

=== Iuliu Barasch, leader of Romanian Jews ===
Born in Brody in 1815, he settled in Romania, where he was the leader of the Bucharest community and wrote L'emancipation des Israélites en Roumanie (1861). He was among the organisers of the Romanian education system and founded the first modern secular Israeli school in Bucharest, with Romanian-language classes.

He was the director of the magazine Isis sau Natura (Isis or Nature, 1856-1859). He had an important activity in historiography and founded the Societatea de Cultura Israelita (The society of Israelite culture) in 1862.

=== Other ===
Johann Hiller was born in Brody in 1754. He was later commissioned into the artillery in 1770 and became known in the Napoleonic fights with the Turks from 1788 to 1791.

Famous 19th-century Jewish chess players Oscar Chajes and Daniel Abraham (Abe) Yanofsky were born in Brody.

The Kahane family was notorious in Brody and included the 18th-century rabbi of Brody Abraham Kahane. Israeli Rabbi Kalman Kahana was born in Brody and grew up there.

In 1938, Kalman Kahana immigrated to Mandatory Palestine, becoming the leader of political party Poalei Agudat Yisrael and a member of the Provisional State Council. He served as a member of the Knesset from 1949 until 1981, and as Deputy Minister of Education and Culture between 1961 and 1966.

=== Pogrom refugees from Russia ===
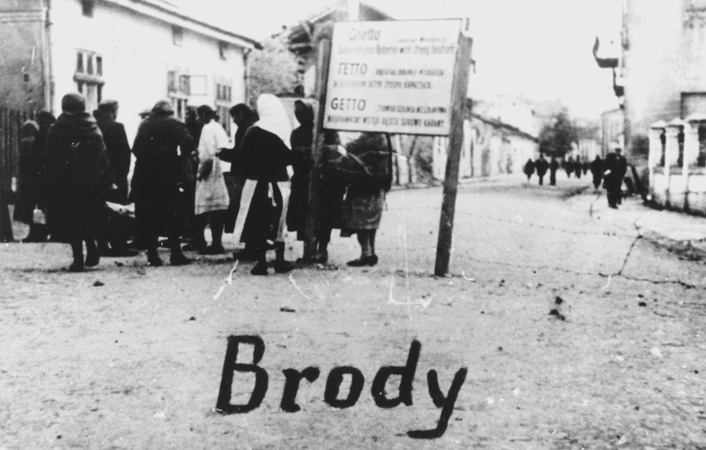
Holocaust: Entrance to the Jewish ghetto in Brody. In January 1943, it housed 6,000 Jews.

After the 1881 pogroms, crowds of Russian Jews flooded into Brody, from where they headed for America or back to Russia. By summer 1882, the number of Russian refugees in Brody reached 20.000; most of them stayed in Brody temporarily until they could immigrate westwards.

In the course of four months, 1,800 immigrants were taken to America. After the arrival of British deputies, the committee was reorganised and managed to send 11 trains with immigrants westwards (in one case 533 people in a go).

The number of refugees continued to grow, reaching 12.476 individuals on June 2, 1882. Ten days later, the number increased to 12.668, despite 1,405 refugees having been already sent during the week.

The social situation deteriorated reaching a critical limit, which prompted Baron Hirsch to entrust his secretary Veneziani with buying an old clothing factory to house the refugees.

== Holocaust ==
On September 19, 1942, around 2,500 Jews of Brody were deported to the extermination camp of Bełżec (today a little town on the Polish-Ukrainian border). 250 Jewish intellectuals were shot near the Jewish cemetery, where now a Holocaust monument stands.

Some of the surviving Jews were imprisoned in the family camp of Pyanytsia (Pianica), in the forests near Lviv. The 9,000 remaining ones were moved into the Brody ghetto and subsequently murdered on May 1, 1943.

Another 3,000 Jews from neighbouring areas of Zolochiv, Lopatyn, and Busk were subsequently added to the Brody ghetto. The harsh work conditions prompted some young people to run away and join the Soviet army to escape the ghetto's poor hygiene and hunger as disease and famine killed hundreds of people.

On November 2, an additional 3,000 Jews were sent from Brody to the Bełżec extermination camp.

Most of the Jewish community perished in the Holocaust, despite the return of several hundred Jews after the end of the war. Most of the returnees had hidden with the partisans in the forest. Among them were also a few concentration camp survivors (e.g. Jacob Jakubowicz), those who fled, or those who had been deported to Soviet territory.

== Rabbis and synagogue ==
The great synagogue (famous Brody Kloiz) was founded in 1742 by Mose Rokach.

The first known rabbis of the city were:

- Saul Katzenellenbogen (1664–1673);
- Isaak Krakower (1674–1673), founder of the Babad family. His son Berko Rabbinowicz was a deputy of the Rus Parliament;
- Abraham Kahane;
- Eleazar Rokach (1718–1734);
- Jakob Jukel Horowitz (1735–1734).

A later line of rabbis includes:

- Nathan Nate b. Arje Löb (1744–1760)
- Isaak Horowitz (1760–1763)
- Joseph Schatzkes (1765–1771)
- Hirsch Zebi from Zamość (1771–1785)
- Meier Kristianpoller (1785–1814)
- Arje Löb Tumim (1814–1830)
- Eliezer Landau (1827–1830)
- Jechiel Michel Kristianpoller (1831–1863)
- Meier Kristianpoller (1866–1886)
- Isaak Chajes (1894–1901)
- M.A. Steinberg (1908–1928)

Brody fostered a number of Maggids and Kabalists including Mose Ostrer, Arje Löb Podhaicer, and Salomo or Shlomo Kluger. Jewish intelligentsia leaders such as Yechezkel Landau and Meyer Margolis were housed in the town's synagogue.

Eleazar Rokach was the head rabbi of Brody for 20 years. According to tradition, he was a descendant of the house of King David and was named after his great-grandfather, rabbi Eleazar of Germiza (Mainz), a famous 12th century Kabbalist. After leaving Brody, he served for 5 years as head rabbi of Amsterdam. He later immigrated to the Holy Land, settling in Tsfat, where he died and was buried.

=== Rabbi Shlomo Kluger ===
Another famous rabbi associated with Brody was Shlomo Kluger (1789–1869).

Known as the Preacher or Maggid of Brody, and by his acronym Maharshak, he served fifty years in the Rabbinate of Brody and was the author of some 174 known books. He was a fierce defender of Judaic traditionalism and opposed the Jewish Enlightenment.

== Literature ==
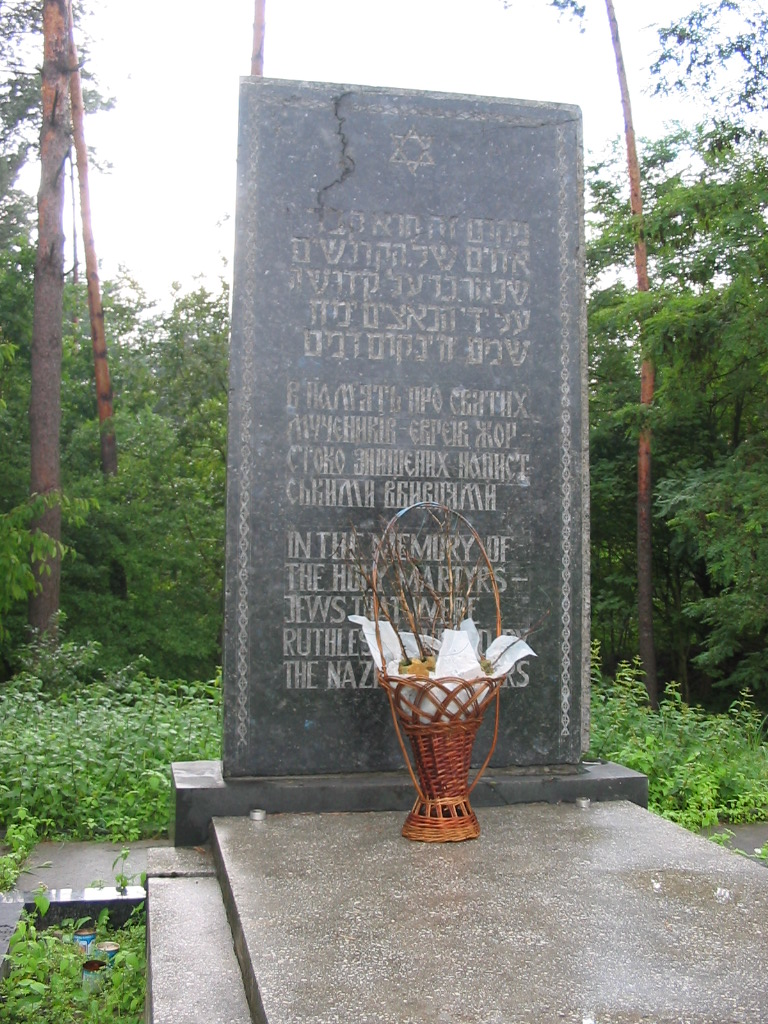
A Holocaust memorial stands by the forest outside Brody where the mass murder of some 6,000 local Jews took place in May 1943. The inscription (in Hebrew, Ukrainian, and English) reads: In the memory of the Holy Martyrs: Jews that were ruthlessly killed by the Nazi murderers.

Source articles (written by the uploader and contributor of the Wikipedia version)

- Roman Zakharii. Galician Jerusalem – Brody as Jewish Intellectual and Cultural Hub of Eastern Galicia. Article, ca. 20 pp., with pictorial material. Leipzig: Simon Dubnow Institute for Jewish History and Culture at Leipzig University, 2004.
- Ruhama Elbag. Brody between the Lines. A literary journey to the `Jerusalem of Austria' - a hothouse in Galicia for Hebrew and Yiddish literature. Article in Israeli newspaper "Haaretz". April 24, 2003.
- Хонигсман Я., Евреи города Броды (1584–1944) - Jews of the city of Brody / Львовск. общ-во евр. культуры им. Шолом-Алейхема. — Львов, 2001. — 120 с., [8] с. ил. 120 экз.
- An Eternal Light: Brody, in Memoriam. Translation of Ner Tamid: Yizkor leBrody. Edited by: Organization of former Brody residents in Israel, 1994.
- Toldot Yehudei Brody (The History of the Jews of Brody) by Nathan Michael Gelber.
- D. Wurm. Z dziejów żydowstwa Brodckiego za c zasów dawnej Rzeczypospolitej do 1772 (From the history of Brody Jewry in times of the old Polish state until 1772). Published in Polish. Brody, 1935.
- Tadeusz Lutman. Studyja nad Dziejami Handlu Brodów w latach 1773–1880 / Studies on the History of Commerce in Brody in the years 1773–1880. In Polish.
- Antonella Tiburzi. Un mondo estinto. La comunità ebraica di Brody e il suo destino (1941-1945), Ombre corte, 2020.

== See also ==
- History of the Jews in Chernivtsi
- History of the Jews in Kharkiv
- History of the Jews in Kyiv
- History of the Jews in Odesa
- History of the Jews in Russia
- History of the Jews in the Soviet Union
