= Haiky-Sytenski =

Village in Rivne Oblast, Ukraine

Haiky-Sytenski Гайки-Ситенські
- Village
- Location within Rivne Oblast Location within Ukraine
- Coordinates: 50°9′55″N 25°26′20″E
- Country: Ukraine
- Oblast: Rivne Oblast
- Raion: Dubno Raion
- Hromada: Krupets rural hromada
- Founded: 1639

Population
  - Total: 423
- Time zone: UTC+2 (EET)
  - Summer (DST): UTC+3 (EEST)
- Postal code: 35543
- Area code: +380 3633
- Website: rada.info/rada/04387579/

Haiky-Sytenski (Ukrainian: Гайки-Ситенські) is a village in western Ukraine. It is in Dubno Raion in Rivne Oblast. It belongs to Krupets rural hromada, one of the hromadas of Ukraine. Haiky-Sytenski is located on the Volhynian Upland. It has population of 423 (2023).

== History ==
In 1906 settlement was a Khutor in Krupets Volost Dubensky Uyezd Volhynian Governorate. It was located 10 verst from Krupets and 41 verst from Dubno. It included 53 homesteads and 328 residents.

Until 12 June 2020, Haiky-Sytenski belonged to Radyvyliv Raion. The raion was abolished that day as part of the administrative reform of Ukraine.

On 17 July 2020, village was again transferred to Dubno Raion as Radyvyliv Raion was abolished.

== Demographics ==
The Ukrainian Census of 2001 showed that the settlement had 487 residents, 99.18% of the Haiky-Sytenski population considered Ukrainian their native language, and 0.82% considered Russian.

== Geography ==
Haiky-Sytenski located in the south Dubno Raion.

The area around Haiky-Sytenski is covered with broad-leaved (oak-beech) forests. Haiky-Sytenski is located on the Volhynian Upland, in the basin of the Styr River, a tributary of the Pripyat.

The climate of the region is moderately continental: winter is mild (in January -4.4 °, -5.1 °), with unstable frosts; summer is warm (in July +18.8 °), not hot. Most often, comfortable weather is observed in the summer months. The formation of stable snow cover is noted in the second decade of December. Rainfall 550 mm per year.

Near Haiky-Sytenski passes the European route E40 Kyiv-Chop, and there is a railway track, where the electric train stops on the Rivne-Lviv route.

== People ==
- Volodymyr Lemeshchuk (1998–2022), a Ukrainian Captain killed in the Russo-Ukrainian War.
- Ivan Lemeshchuk (1993-2014), a Ukrainian soldier killed in the Russo-Ukrainian War.
