= Bokiima rural hromada =

Bokiima rural hromada Бокіймівська сільська громада
- Hromada
- Interactive map of Bokiima rural hromada
- Country: Ukraine
- Oblast (province): Rivne Oblast
- Raion (district): Dubno Raion
- Established: 2020
- Administrative center: Bokiima

Area
  - Total: 192 km^{2} (74 sq mi)

Population
  - Total: 5,450
  - Density: 28.4/km^{2} (73.5/sq mi)

Bokiima rural territorial hromada (Ukrainian: Бокіймівська сільська територіальна громада, romanized: Bokiimivska silska terytorialna hromada) is a hromada (municipality) in Dubno Raion of Rivne Oblast in western Ukraine. Its administrative centre is the village of Bokiima.The hromada is located within the Volhynian Upland, on the left bank of the Ikva River.The area of the community is 192.0 km², the population is 5 450 inhabitants.

== Composition ==
The Bokiima rural hromada of the Dubno District of the Rivne Region was formed in June 2017 as a result of the merger of 5 village councils: Bokiymi, Viynytska, Vovnytska, Smordvivska, and Khorupanska. The hromada consists of 14 villages:

- Arshychyn
- Baboloky
- Bokiima (administrative centre)
- Holovchytsi
- Khorupan
- Klyn
- Kozyrshchyna
- Krasne
- Myatyn
- Pekaliv
- Rudlyve
- Smordva
- Vovnychi
- Viinytsia

== Geography ==
Bokiima rural hromada is located in the southeastern part of Dubno Raion. The administrative center of the hromada is the village of Bokiima. The area of the community is 192.0 km², the population is 5 450 inhabitants. The hromada is located within the Volhynian Upland. The relief is characterized by the presence of numerous ravines and wide beams with gentle slopes.

The climate of the region is moderately continental: winter is mild (in January -4.4 °С), with unstable frosts; summer is warm (in July +18.1 °С), not hot. Most often, comfortable weather is observed in the summer months. The formation of stable snow cover is noted in the second decade of December. Rainfall 570 mm per year.

The territory of the Bokiymi hromada is located on the left bank of the Ikva River, a left tributary of the Styr (Pripyat basin).

== Economy ==
The agriculture of the Bokiymi hromada specializes in growing grain crops, legumes, and oilseeds.

External and internal transport connections of the hromada are carried out only by road transport.

== Notable people ==
Volodymyr Homeniuk was born - Ukrainian footballer, striker of the Metalist Kharkiv football club and the Ukrainian national team.
