= Krupets rural hromada =

Municipality in Rivne Oblast, Ukraine

Krupets rural hromada Крупецька сільська громада
- Hromada
- Interactive map of Krupets rural hromada
- Country: Ukraine
- Oblast (province): Rivne Oblast
- Raion (district): Dubno Raion
- Established: 2016
- Administrative center: Krupets

Area
  - Total: 180.1 km^{2} (69.5 sq mi)

Population
  - Total: 8,813
  - Density: 48.93/km^{2} (126.7/sq mi)

Krupets rural territorial hromada (Ukrainian: Крупецька сільська територіальна громада, romanized: Krupetska silska terytorialna hromada) is a hromada (municipality) in Dubno Raion of Rivne Oblast in western Ukraine. Its administrative centre is the village of Krupets. The area of the community is 297.9 km², the population is 8,967 inhabitants (2018) The Krupets rural hromada is located in western Ukraine, in the Volhynian Upland, in the basin of the Styr River.

== Composition ==
Formed on December 15, 2015 by merging Boratynska, Krupetskaya, Mykhailivska and Sytnenska village councils of Radyvylivskyi district. On June 12, 2020, by merging Boratynska, Krupetskaya, Mykhailivska, Ridkivska, Sytnenska, Tesluhivska and Khotynska village councils of Radyvylivskyi district, a modern community was created, which on July 19, 2020, as a result of the administrative-territorial reform and liquidation of Radyvylivskyi district, became part of Dubno district.

The hromada consists of 25 villages:

- Baranne
- Boratyn
- Dovhalivka
- Haiky
- Haiky-Sytenski
- Honoratka
- Hnylche
- Karpylivka
- Khotyn
- Korytne
- Koty
- Krupets (administrative centre)
- Mykhailivka
- Mytnytsia
- Nova Mytnytsia
- Pliashivka
- Polunychne
- Ridkiv
- Sribne
- Sytne
- Tabachuky
- Tesluhiv
- Vesele
- Zamishchyna
- Zasuv

== Geography ==
The community is located in the southwest of the Dubno Raion. The area of the district is 297.9 km^{2}.

The Krupets rural hromada is located in the Volhynian Upland, in the basin of the Styr River, a tributary of the Pripyat. The area around hromada is covered with broad-leaved (oak-beech) forests.

Krupets rural hromada has reserves of peat, chalk, clay.

The climate of the region is moderately continental: winter is mild (in January -4.4 °, -5.1 °), with unstable frosts; summer is warm (in July +18.8 °), not hot. Most often, comfortable weather is observed in the summer months. The formation of stable snow cover is noted in the second decade of December. Rainfall 550 mm per year.

== Economy ==
The district's industries include logging and woodworking, chemical industry, food and light industry.

== Transport ==
The European route E40 Kyiv-Chop, and the Southwestern Railways of Ukraine railways pass through the hromada .
