= Goldenthal =

Goldenthal is a surname. Notable people with the name include:

- Elliot Goldenthal (born 1954), American composer
- Jacob Goldenthal (1815-1867), academic orientalist born in Austria-Hungary
