= Kozyn, Rivne Oblast =

Kozyn Козин
- Village
- Location within Ukraine
- Coordinates: 50°16′03″N 25°28′05″E
- Country: Ukraine
- Oblast: Rivne
- Raion: Radyvyliv

Kozyn (Ukrainian: Козин, Polish: Kozin) is a village in the Radyvyliv Raion, Rivne Oblast, in western Ukraine.

== History ==
The town was founded in 1538 by a decree of King Sigismund I the Old. Sigismund I established weekly markets and annual fairs.

During World War II, the village was first occupied by the Soviet Union from September 1939, and then by Germany from June 1941 to March 1944. In May 1942, the Germans established a ghetto for Jews from Kozin and other nearby localities. On 30 May 1942, the Germans selected 372 Jews considered not fit for work, and then the SiPo and SD massacred them in Hranowka, just west of Kozin. On 6 October 1942, the ghetto was liquidated and some 700 Jews were massacred by the SiPo and SD in Hranowka. Around 30 Jews were hid and rescued by Czech and Polish farmers.
