= Povcha Upland =

Hill range in Ukraine, part of the East European Plain

Coordinates: 50°22′30″N 25°30′00″E

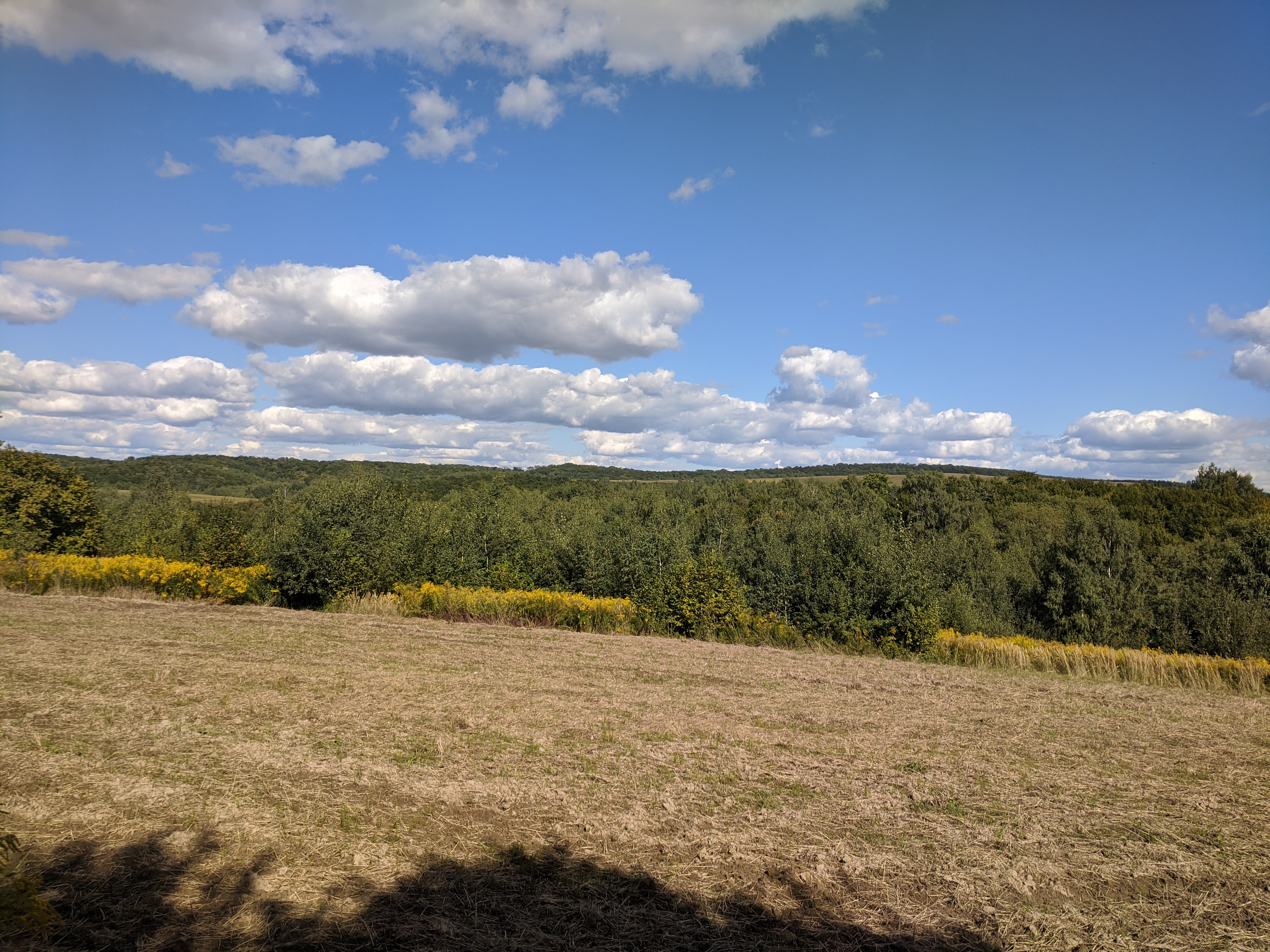
View of the Kameniarnia ravine in the Povcha Upland

The Povcha Upland (Ukrainian: Повчанська височина, romanized: Povchanska vysochyna) is a hill range in Ukraine, forming part of the Volhynian Upland.

The Povcha Upland is situated in western Ukraine, between the valleys of the Styr and the Ikva, surrounding and taking its name from the village of Povcha (Ukrainian: Повча; former Polish name: Pełcza), about 105 km from the Polish Ukrainian border. Its highest peak is at 361 m a.s.l. (358 m according to other sources) compared to the mean maximum altitude of the surrounding plain being about 270–280 m; this is the highest point of the Volhynian Upland.

The Povcha Upland is also called a 'range' (Polish: Pasmo Pełczańskie) or even (in older sources) 'mountains' (Polish: Góry Pełczańskie). Sometimes it is treated as the Povcha-Mizoch Range (Polish: Pasmo Pełczańsko-Mizockie) together with its eastern continuation, the Mizoch Range; however, on account of differences in geology and geomorphology, the Povcha Upland and the Mizoch Range are better treated as separate physiographic units. The western continuation of the Povcha Upland is the Sokal Plateau-ridge (Ukrainian: Сокальське пасмо; Polish: Grzęda Sokalska) situated partly in Ukraine and partly in Poland.

Natural vegetation of the Povcha Upland consists or consisted of deciduous and mixed forests, with small patches of steppe vegetation on southern slopes of the hills.

In the Povcha Upland there are (or used to be) a few outcrops of Devonian rocks. Their scientific importance is due to the fact that these are the only outcrops of this system in an area otherwise devoid of any (namely between the Holy Cross Mountains to the west and the Dniester valley to the east). Middle Devonian fossil fauna, including brachiopods, corals, and conodonts, is known from the environs of Povcha.
