= Yaroslavychi rural hromada =

Municipality in Rivne Oblast, Ukraine

Yaroslavychi rural hromada Ярославицька сільська громада
- Hromada
- Interactive map of Yaroslavychi rural hromada
- Country: Ukraine
- Oblast (province): Rivne Oblast
- Raion (district): Dubno Raion
- Established: 2017
- Administrative center: Yaroslavychi

Area
  - Total: 106.8 km^{2} (41.2 sq mi)

Population
  - Total: 2,702
  - Density: 25.30/km^{2} (65.53/sq mi)

Yaroslavychi rural territorial hromada (Ukrainian: Ярославицька сільська територіальна громада, romanized: Yaroslavytska silska terytorialna hromada) is a hromada (municipality) in Dubno Raion of Rivne Oblast in western Ukraine. Its administrative centre is the village of Yaroslavychi.

== Composition ==
The hromada consists of 10 villages:

- Boremets
- Chekno
- Nadchytsi
- Novoukrainka
- Velyka Horodnytsia
- Pidlistsi
- Svyshchiv
- Yalovychi
- Yaroslavychi (administrative centre)
- Zoriane
