= Great Synagogue (Brody) =

Former synagogue in Brody, Ukraine

Great Synagogue of Brody
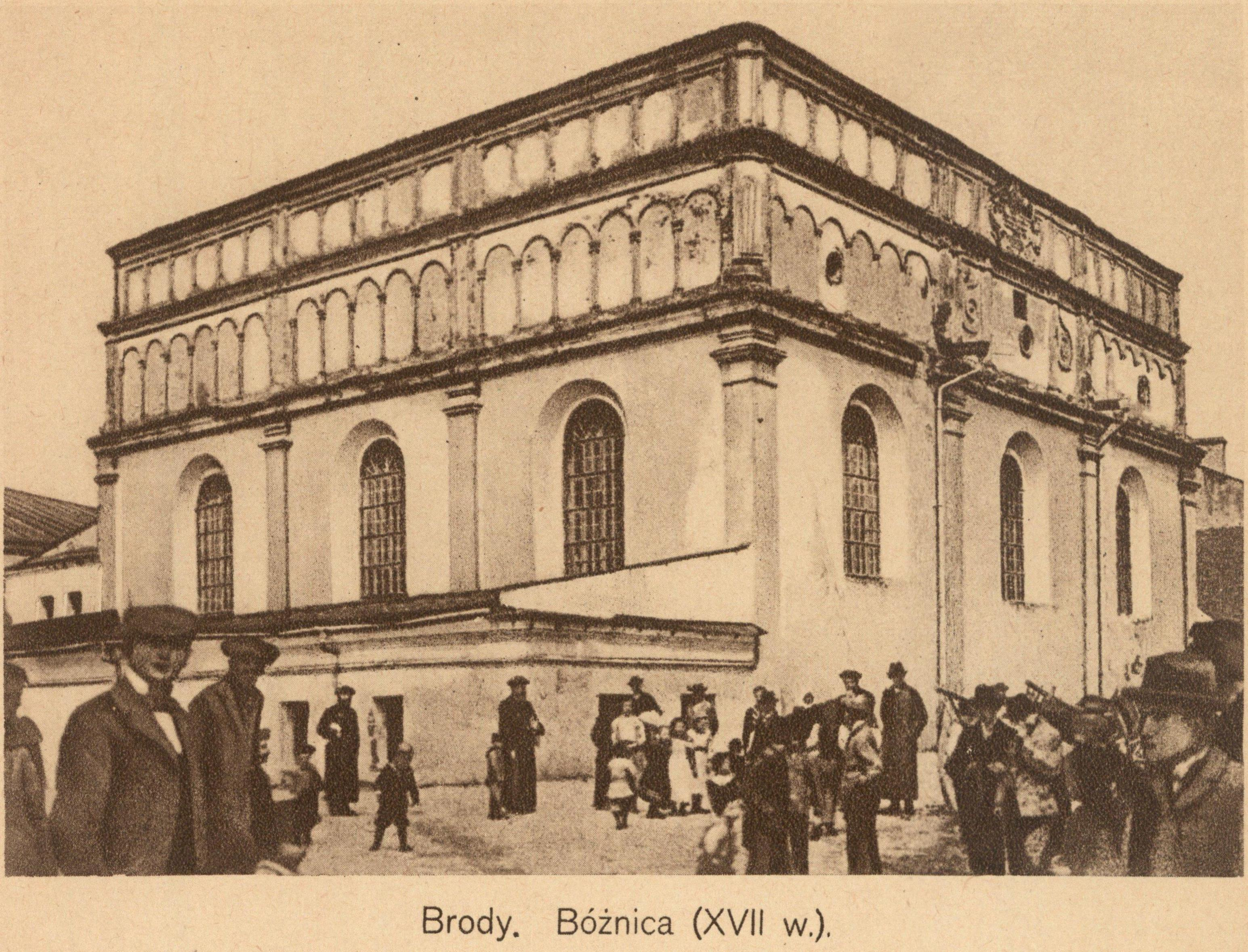
- The former Great Synagogue, in 1900

- Location of the former synagogue in Ukraine

Religion
- Affiliation: Orthodox Judaism (former)
- Rite: Nusach Ashkenaz
- Ecclesiastical or organizational status: Synagogue (1742–1943)
- Status: Abandoned

Location
- Location: Kuznetsova Street, Brody, Lviv Oblast 80600
- Country: Ukraine
- Interactive map of Great Synagogue of Brody
- Coordinates: 50°04′57″N 25°08′28″E

Architecture
- Type: Synagogue architecture
- Style: Renaissance Revival
- Funded by: Jacob Yitskovych
- Completed: 1742; 1902 (repair following fire)
- Materials: Stone

Immovable Monument of National Significance of Ukraine
- Official name: Синагога (Synagogue)
- Type: Architecture
- Reference no.: 130069

The Great Synagogue of Brody, also known as the Old Fortress Synagogue, is a former Orthodox Jewish synagogue, located in Brody, in the Lviv Oblast of Ukraine. The congregation worshipped in the Ashkenazi rite. Constructed in the mid-18th century in the former Polish–Lithuanian Commonwealth, the building was significantly damaged by the Nazis in 1943, and has since fallen into disrepair.

== History ==
On the site of the Great Synagogue was originally a wooden synagogue, which was destroyed in a fire in 1696. In its place the large stone fortress synagogue was built, starting in 1742. It was damaged in a fire which destroyed most of Brody in 1859. Repairs began at the beginning of the next century, and in 1935 it was registered as a cultural monument and renovated.

The Great Synagogue held a large collection of Jewish ceremonial art, and its interior was richly decorated. The former synagogue building is listed as a monument of Architectural Heritage of National Importance of Ukraine.

The former synagogue was partially restored in the 1960s; and it served as a warehouse, during the Soviet era. Further restorations began in 1991, to adaptat the building into an art gallery. However, the cost became prohibitive. The northern and southern extensions of the building have been lost. In 1988 the western wall collapsed, and since 2006 the vault also began to collapse. In 2021, the roof began to collapse; and there was criticism that funds from a 2019 concert, to celebrate the 125th anniversary of the birth of Brody writer, Joseph Roth, that included a performance of Symphony No. 3 "Kaddish" by Leonard Bernstein, had not been applied to benefit the restoration of the former synagogue.

== Gallery ==
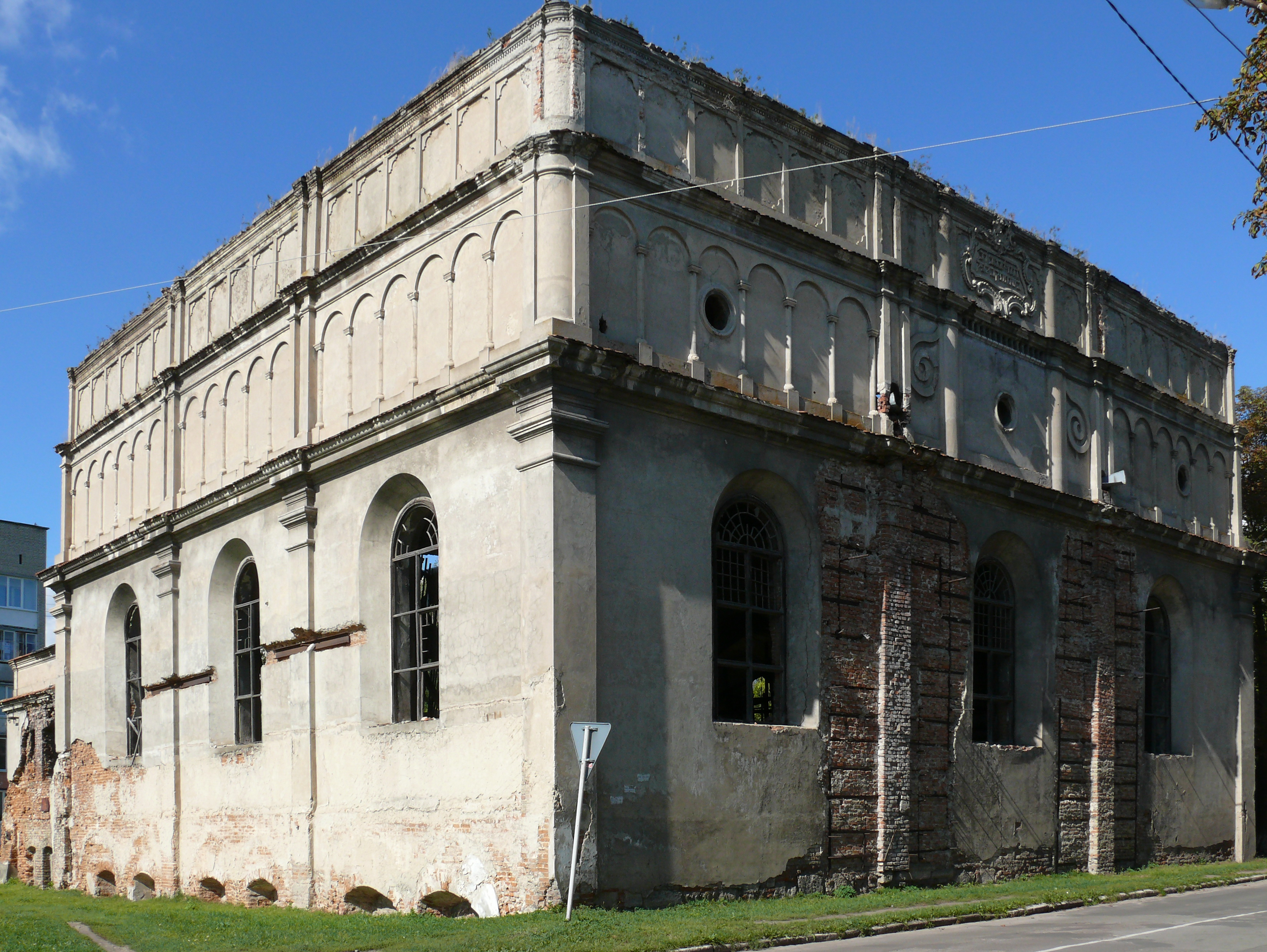
The former synagogue in 2012

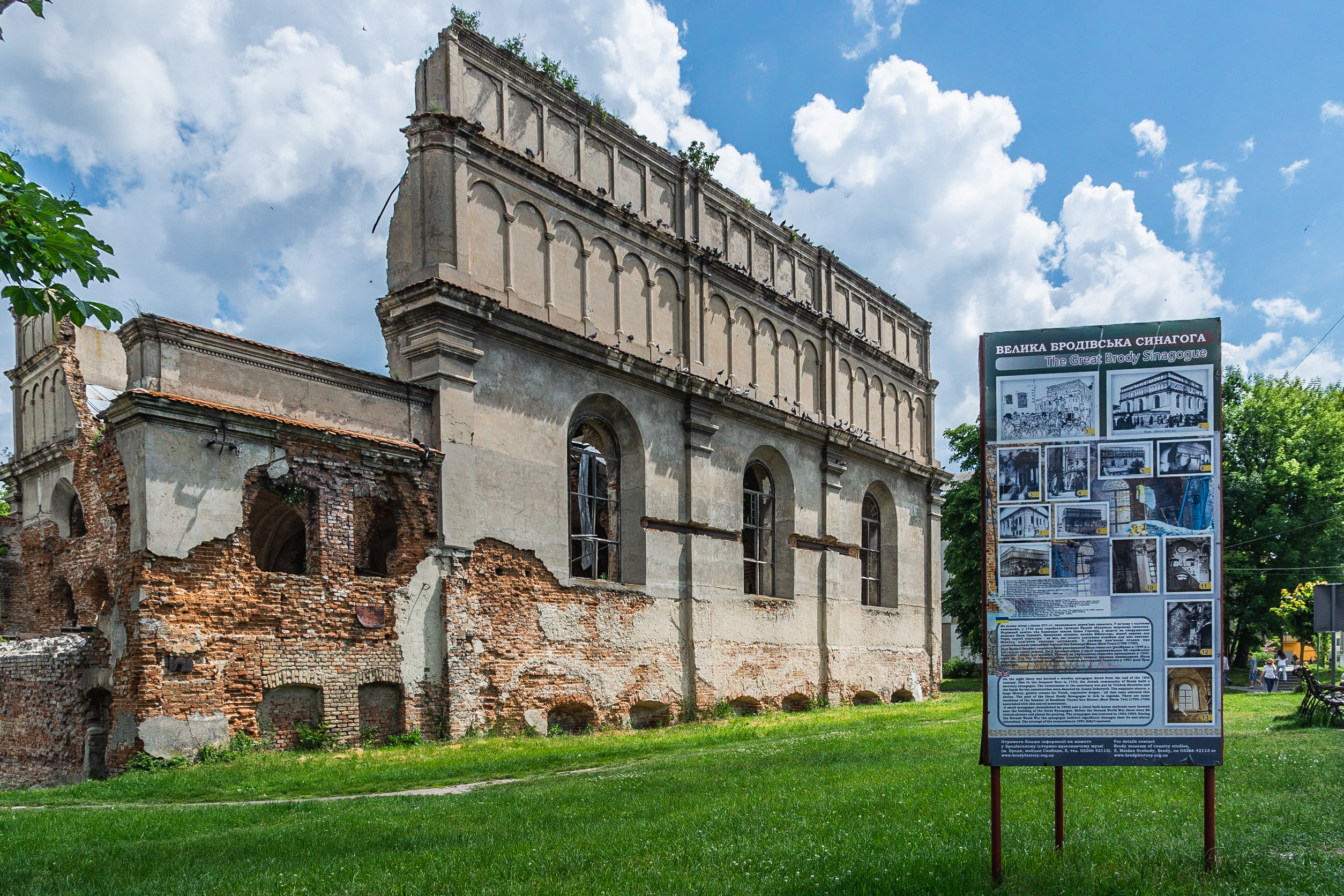
The former synagogue in 2021

== See also ==
- History of the Jews in Brody
- History of the Jews in Ukraine
- List of synagogues in Ukraine
