= Radyvyliv =

City in Rivne Oblast, Ukraine

Radyvyliv Радивилів
- City
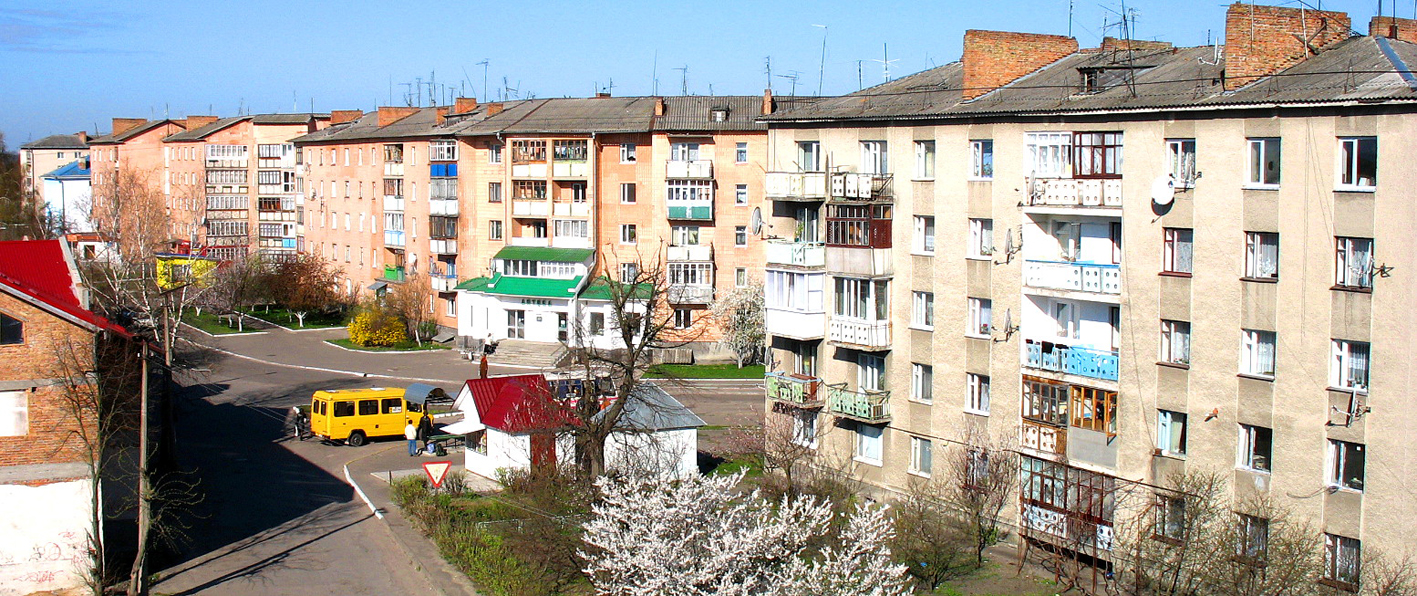
- Skyline of Radyvyliv

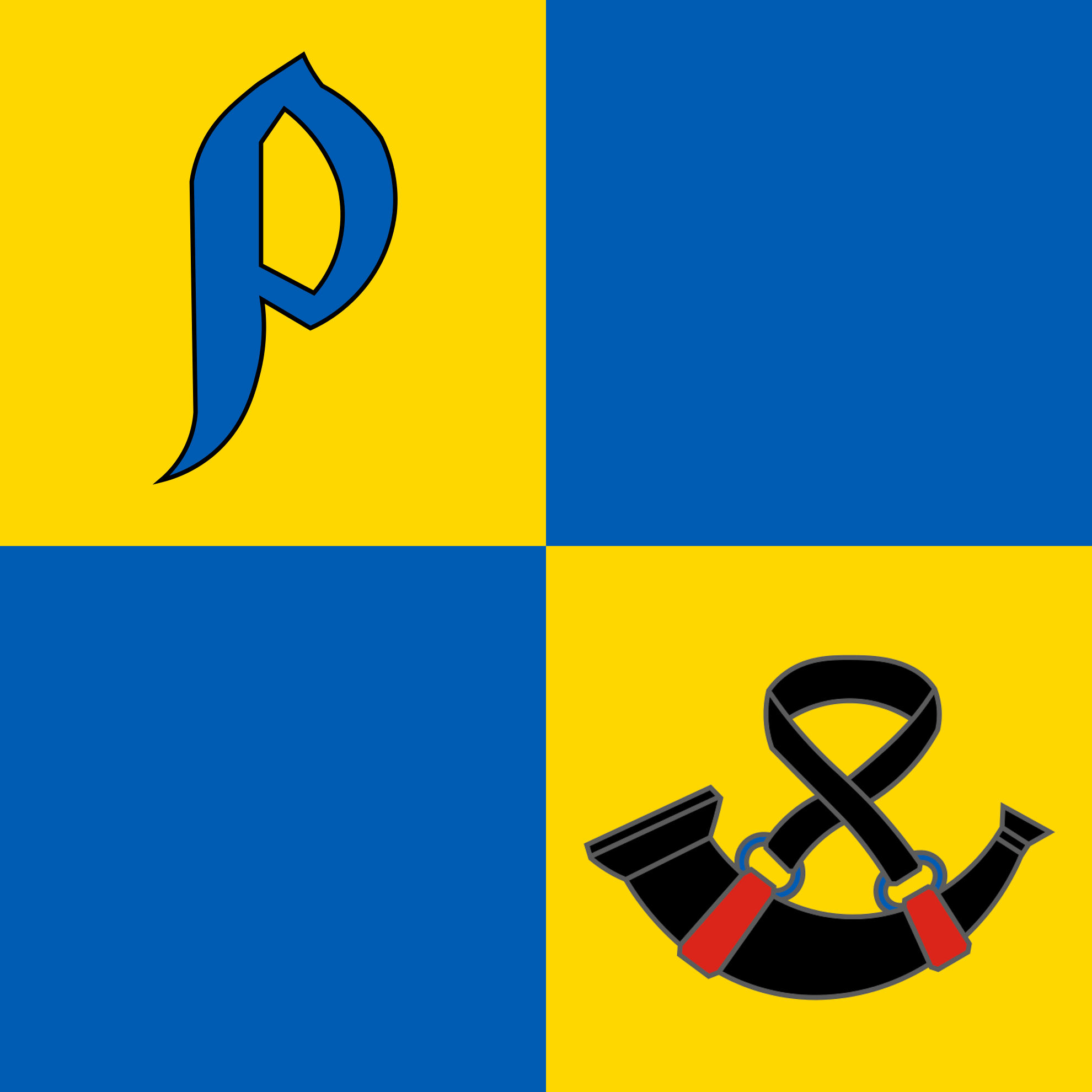
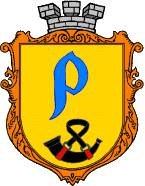
- Flag Coat of arms
- Interactive map of Radyvyliv
- Location within Rivne Oblast Location within Ukraine
- Coordinates: 50°07′43″N 25°15′52″E
- Country: Ukraine
- Oblast: Rivne Oblast
- Raion: Dubno Raion
- Hromada: Radyvyliv urban hromada
- First mentioned: 1564
- City rights: 1940

Population (2022)
  - Total: 10,427

Radyvyliv (Ukrainian: Радивилів [rɐdeˈwɪlʲiu̯]) (Note: Russian: Радивилов, romanized: Radivilov, IPA: [rədʲɪˈvʲiɫəf]; Belarusian: Радывыліў, romanized: Radyvyliw, IPA: [radɨˈvɨlʲiu̯]; Polish: Radziwiłłów, cyrillized: Радзивиллов, IPA: [radʑiˈviwːuf]; Yiddish: ראדזיווילוב, romanized: Radzivilov, IPA: [radzɪˈvɪlɔv]) is a small city in Rivne Oblast (region), Ukraine. It was the administrative center of the former Radyvyliv Raion (district) until its dissolution in 2020, and is located south-west of the oblast capital, Rivne, near European route E40. The nearest larger cities are Dubno and Brody; the latter being 10 km (6 mi) away.

During Soviet times, from 1939 to 1992, the city was known as Chervonoarmiisk. (Note: Ukrainian: Червоноармійськ, romanized: Červonoarmijśk; Russian: Червоноармейск, romanized: Červonoarmejsk) It had an estimated population of 10,427 (2022 estimate).

== History ==
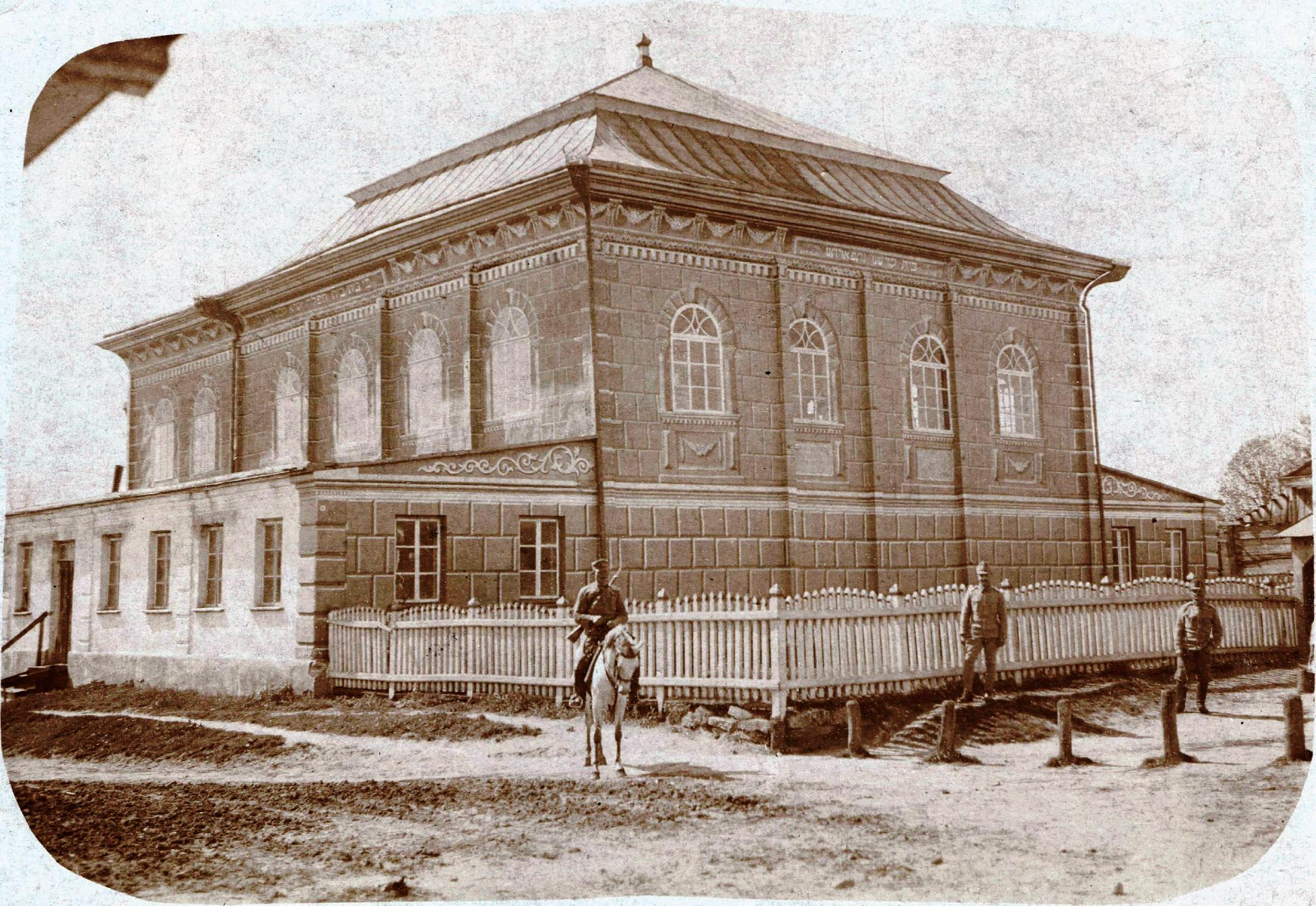
Old Great Synagogue in 1914

In the 14th century, together with whole Volhynia, Radyvyliv was annexed by the Grand Duchy of Lithuania. Following the 1569 Union of Lublin, the town was transferred to the Kingdom of Poland, where it remained for over 200 years. As a result of the Third Partition of Poland in 1795, Radziwiłłow, as it was called, became a town of the Kremenetsky Uyezd in the Volhynian Governorate of the Russian Empire.

In the late 1800s, the Jewish population reached 4,000. Between World War I and the civil war between Ukrainian nationalists and Bolsheviks, the Jewish population declined to around 2,000.

During the January Uprising, a unit of Józef Wysocki operated in the area of Radyvyliv. After World War I, the town returned to Poland, and was part of Dubno County, Volhynian Voivodeship. Its residents were Jewish (50%), Ukrainian (31%), and Polish (17%).

=== World War II and the Holocaust ===
In September 1939, at the onset of the Second World War, the town was occupied by Soviet forces. Some Jewish refugees who refused to accept Soviet citizenship were deported to the Soviet interior. The local Polish police chief and a local Polish lawyer were murdered by the Russians in the Katyn massacre in 1940.

The Wehrmacht's 6th Army occupied the town from June 1941 to March 1944. During the first days of the occupation, Jews were robbed by German and Ukrainian forces. On 15 July 1941, 27 Jews accused of communist activities were executed. The following day, Ukrainians organized a public burning of Jewish prayer books and other religious items.

On 15 August, all Jews were gathered in the marketplace while their homes were looted. A ghetto was established in April 1942 for the Jewish population of the town and surrounding villages, totaling 2,600 people. The ghetto's population was divided into "productive" and "unproductive" groups, with 400 and 2,200 Jews, respectively. Those classified as "productive" were forced into labor. Overcrowding and poor conditions led to widespread disease and hunger.

On 29 May 1942, the section of the ghetto housing the "unproductive" Jews was surrounded by German forces, assisted by Ukrainian collaborators, in preparation for their murder. Those unable to walk were killed within the ghetto, while others were marched to a nearby area, forced to undress, and shot by machine guns. In total, 1,350 Jews were killed that day.

A second Aktion took place on 6 October 1942. By then, ghetto residents were aware of the impending massacre, and about 500 Jews attempted to flee, although many were subsequently caught and killed. Approximately 950 Jews who remained in the ghetto were murdered. By the time the Red Army arrived in the summer of 1944, only 51 Jews from the town had survived.

During the Volhynian Genocide, ethnic Poles from villages in the area fled to the town, to escape Ukrainian nationalists. Almost all those who survived the slaughter left Radyvyliv, and settled in the People's Republic of Poland's Recovered Territories.

=== After World War II ===
In January 1989, the population was 10,353.

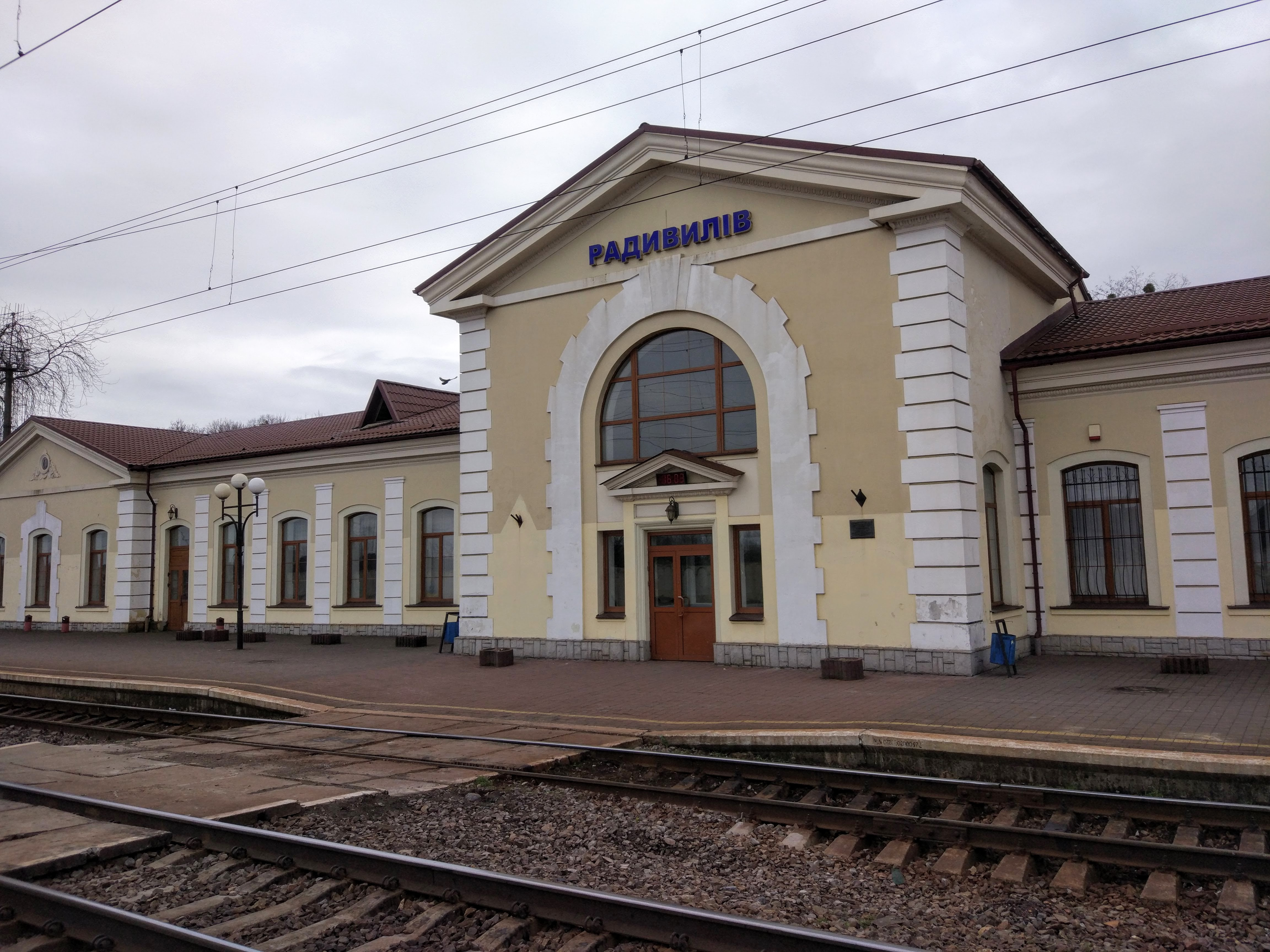
Railway station

== Notable individuals ==
- Anton Kushnir (born 1984), Belarusian aerial skier
