= Myrohoshcha rural hromada =

Municipality in Rivne Oblast, Ukraine

Myrohoshcha rural hromada Мирогощанська сільська громада
- Hromada
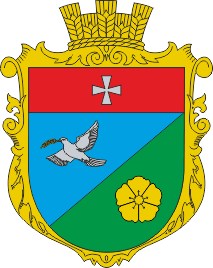
- Seal
- Interactive map of Myrohoshcha rural hromada
- Country: Ukraine
- Oblast (province): Rivne Oblast
- Raion (district): Dubno Raion
- Established: 2020
- Administrative center: Myrohoshcha Persha

Area
  - Total: 114.4 km^{2} (44.2 sq mi)

Population
  - Total: 6,774
  - Density: 59.21/km^{2} (153.4/sq mi)

Myrohoshcha rural territorial hromada (Ukrainian: Мирогощанська сільська територіальна громада, romanized: Myrohoshchanska silska terytorialna hromada) is a hromada (municipality) in Dubno Raion of Rivne Oblast in western Ukraine. Its administrative centre is the village of Myrohoshcha Persha.

== Composition ==
The hromada consists of 14 villages:

- Botsianivka
- Biloberizhzhia
- Kniahynyn
- Kostianets
- Lypa
- Lystvyn
- Mokre
- Molodizhne
- Myrohoshcha Druha
- Myrohoshcha Persha (administrative centre)
- Naraiv
- Ostriv
- Travneve
- Zaruddia

== History ==
During the second part of the 19th century the lands of the future hromada were settled by Czech immigrants, and Myrohoschcha became a centre of beer production. The first brewery in the settlement was opened by Václav Linhart.
