= Abraham Gershon of Kitov =

18th-century Hasidic rabbi

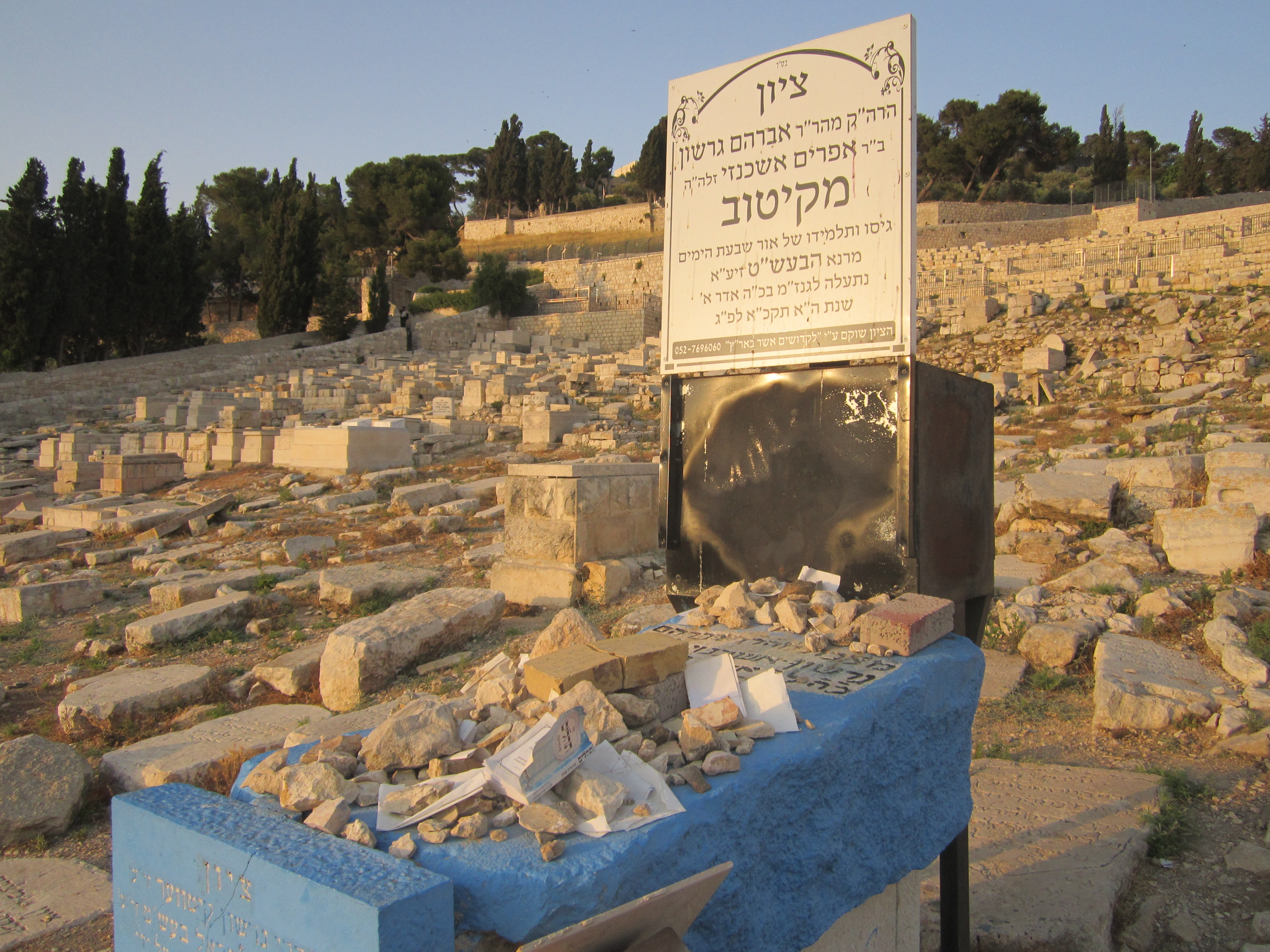
- Grave on the Mount of Olives

Personal life
- Born: Avraham Gershon Ashkenasi c. 1701
- Died: 25 Adar I 1761 Jerusalem
- Buried: Mount of Olives Jerusalem
- Spouse: unknown, Bluma
- Children: Moses, Yitzhak, Ephraim Fishel, Yehudah Leib, Chaim Aaron, Yakir, and two daughters
- Parent: R. Ephraim of Brody (father)

Religious life
- Religion: Judaism

Abraham Gershon of Kitov, also known as Rabbi Gershon of Brody, was probably born in or near Kuty (Kitov), Polish–Lithuanian Commonwealth around 1701 and died in Jerusalem in 1761. He is best known as the Baal Shem Tov's brother-in-law.

== Rabbinical career ==
A scion of a famous rabbinic family, Abraham Gershon is a descendant (possibly the grandson) of Shabbatai ha-Kohen ("the ShACh") (1625–1663). Both Abraham Gershon and his father Ephraim of Brody served in one of the four beit din (Jewish Court) of Brody. It was here that he and his father encountered Rabbi Israel "Baal Shem Tov". According to the early Chasidic work Shivchei haBesht, his father gave his blessing of marriage for his sister Chana to the Baal Shem Tov on his deathbed. But once Ephraim died, Abraham Gershon was unaware of this secret betrothal until the Baal Shem Tov revealed the engagement contract.

Abraham Gershon rose to a powerful position within the Jewish community of Brody. For a time he served as a synagogue cantor. Shivchei haBesht portrays Abraham Gershon as a foil to the Baal Shem Tov. He is usually represented as a learned man of the upper class who regards his brother-in-law as lowly and untrustworthy. When the Baal Shem Tov's piousness and scholarship were revealed, Abraham Gershon became one of the Baal Shem Tov's ardent admirers.

In 1745, Abraham Gershon was involved in ruling on a promiscuity case about the daughter-in-law of one of the wealthiest men in town. This man had strong connections to government officials. After ruling against the daughter-in-law, Abraham Gershon was forced to flee Brody to avoid being publicly punished. He took refuge with the Baal Shem Tov in Medzhybizh. Affiliated with new Hasidic thoughts as well as traditional Lurian liturgy, the Baal Shem Tov entrusted his brother-in-law with the education of his only son, Tzvi.

In 1747, Abraham Gershon traveled to Jerusalem, one of the first Hasidim to establish a presence in the Holy Land. There he embraced the Rashash, together with those who were students of Kabbalah. He lived in Hebron for six years. In 1753, he moved to Jerusalem and was further associated with the (kabbalistic) Yeshivat Beit El. He died in 1761 and was buried on the Mount of Olives. After the Six-Day War in 1967, his grave was rediscovered along with the grave of his second wife Bluma.

== See also ==
- History of the Jews in Brody
- Baal Shem Tov family tree
- Yishuv haYashan
