= Nirenstein =

Nirenstein (also spelled Nierenstein or the Polish version Nirensztajn) is a Yiddish and German-language surname. The word, Niere and Stein, literally translates as "kidney stone"

Notable people with this surname include:

- Fiamma Nirenstein (born 1945), Italian-Israeli politician
- Otto Kallir (born Otto Nirenstein; 1894–1978), Austrian-American artist
- Maximilian Nierenstein (1877–1946), German professor
- Pola Nirensztajn (1910–1992), Polish dancer
