= Kratter =

Kratter is a German surname which is Austrian and Swiss. Notable people with the surname include:

- Elena Kratter (born 1996), Swiss para-athlete
- Giacomo Kratter (born 1982), Italian snowboarder
- Kaitlin Kratter, American astronomer
- Marvin Kratter (born 1915–1999), American real estate developer
