= Radyvyliv Raion =

Former subdivision of Rivne Oblast, Ukraine

Radyvyliv Raion Радивилівський район
- Raion
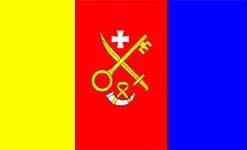
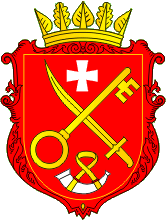
- Flag Coat of arms

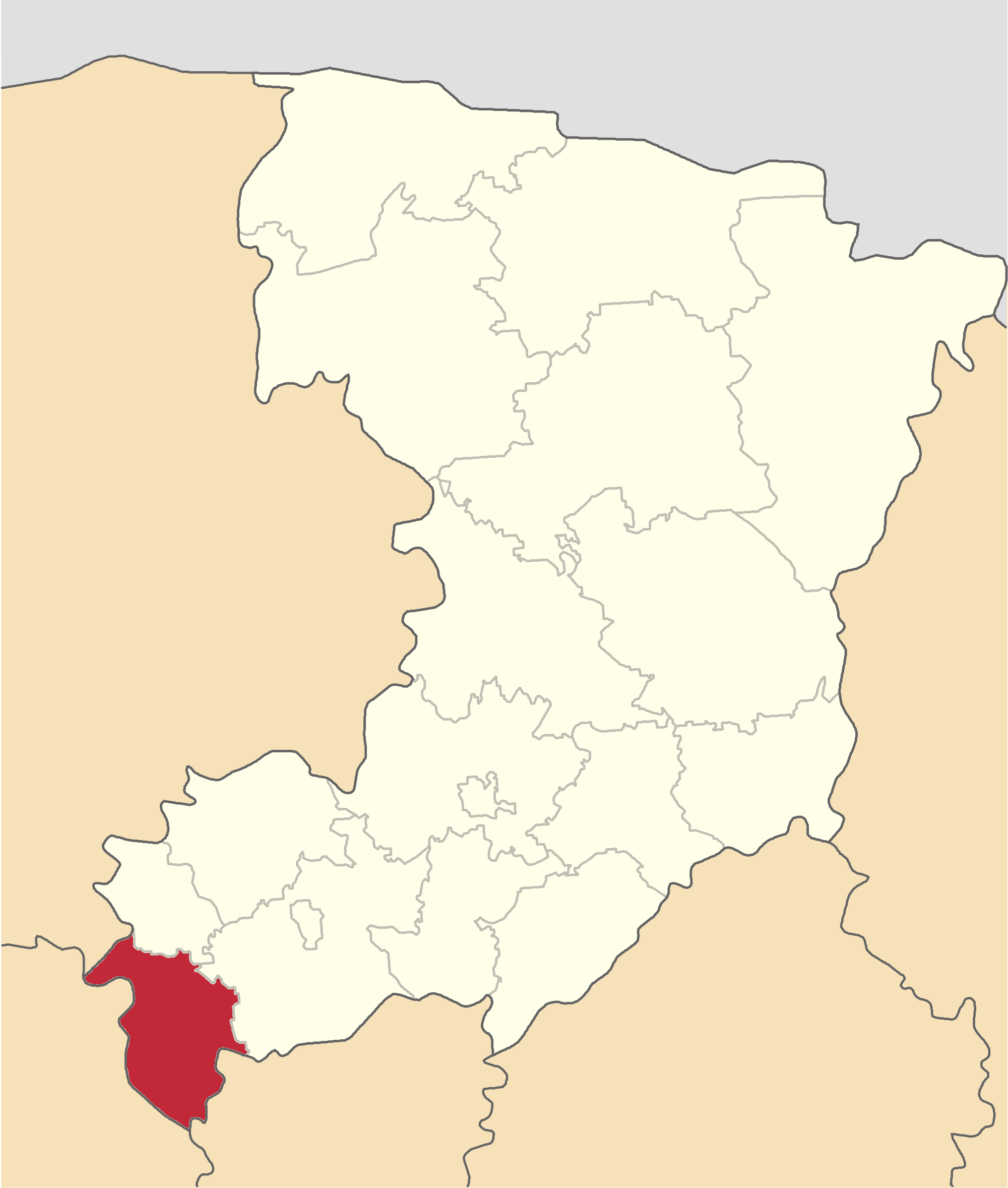
- Coordinates: 50°12′36″N 25°20′30″E
- Country: Ukraine
- Oblast: Rivne Oblast
- Established: 1939
- Disestablished: 18 July 2020
- Admin. center: Radyvyliv
- Subdivisions: List: — city councils; — settlement councils; — rural councils; Number of localities: — cities; — urban-type settlements; 74 — villages; — rural settlements

Area
  - Total: 745 km^{2} (288 sq mi)

Population (2020)
  - Total: 36,435
  - Density: 48.9/km^{2} (127/sq mi)
- Time zone: UTC+02:00 (EET)
  - Summer (DST): UTC+03:00 (EEST)
- Area code: 380-3264
- Website: http://www.rv.gov.ua/sitenew/radyvylivsk Radyvyliv Raion

Radyvyliv Raion (Ukrainian: Радивилівський район) was a raion in Rivne Oblast in western Ukraine. Its administrative center was the town of Radyvyliv. The raion was abolished and its territory was merged into Dubno Raion on 18 July 2020 as part of the administrative reform of Ukraine, which reduced the number of raions of Rivne Oblast to four. The last estimate of the raion population was 36,435 (2020 est.)

== See also ==
- Subdivisions of Ukraine
