= Dubno Raion =

Subdivision of Rivne Oblast, Ukraine

Dubno Raion Дубенський район
- Raion
- Flag Coat of arms

- Interactive map of Dubno Raion
- Coordinates: 50°21′11.343″N 25°47′33.162″E
- Country: Ukraine
- Oblast: Rivne Oblast
- Established: 1939
- Admin. center: Dubno
- Subdivisions: 19 hromadas

Area
  - Total: 1,200 km^{2} (460 sq mi)

Population (2022)
  - Total: 165,911
  - Density: 140/km^{2} (360/sq mi)
- Time zone: UTC+02:00 (EET)
  - Summer (DST): UTC+03:00 (EEST)
- Area code: +380
- Website: http://www.rv.gov.ua/sitenew/dubensk/ua Dubno Raion

Dubno Raion (Ukrainian: Дубенський район) is a raion (district) in Rivne Oblast in western Ukraine. Its administrative center is located in Dubno. Population: 165,911 (2022 estimate).

On 18 July 2020, as part of the administrative reform of Ukraine, the number of raions of Rivne Oblast was reduced to four, and the area of Dubno Raion was significantly expanded. The January 2020 estimate of the raion population was 44,352 (2020 est.).

== Communities of the district ==
The number of settlements in Dubno Raion is 303. Number of cities – 2. The district includes 19 territorial communities: Dubno, Radyvyliv urban, Demydiv, Smyha, Mlyniv settlement, Boremel, Varkovychi, Verba, Myrohoshcha, Povcha, Pryvilne, Semyduby, Tarakaniv, Bokiyma, Ostrozhets, Pidloztsi, Yaroslavychi, Kozyn, Krupets rural hromadas.

== Geography ==
The area of the district is 3294.2 km^{2}.

The district borders the Rivne Raion of the Rivne Oblast, as well as the Ternopil Oblast, Volyn region and Lviv Oblast of Ukraine.

The relief of the Dubno Raion is flat, partly lowland, covered with pine and oak forests. Varash Raion has reserves of peat, chalk, clay.

The larger area of the district is located in the Volhynian Upland. Dubno Raion is located in the basins of the Pripyat River and Bug. The climate of the region is moderately continental: winter is mild (in January -4.4 °, -5.1 °), with unstable frosts; summer is warm (in July +18.8 °), not hot. Most often, comfortable weather is observed in the summer months. The formation of stable snow cover is noted in the second decade of December. Rainfall 550 mm per year.

The Dermansko-Mostiv Regional Landscape Park are located on the territory of the Rivne district.

== Economy ==
The district grows grain and industrial crops, breeds cattle and pigs. The district's industries include logging and woodworking, chemical industry, food and light industry.

== Transport ==
Highways pass through the Dubno Raion: European route E40 and European route E85.

== See also ==
- Subdivisions of Ukraine
- Sarny Raion
- Varash Raion

== Bibliography ==
- Національний атлас України/НАН України, Інститут географії, Державна служба геодезії, картографії та кадастру; голов. ред. Л. Г. Руденко; голова ред. кол.Б.Є. Патон. — К.: ДНВП «Картографія», 2007. — 435 с. — 5 тис.прим. — ISBN 978-966-475-067-4.
- Коротун І.М., Коротун Л.К. Географія Рівненської області. – Рівне, 1996. – 274 с
- Географічна енциклопедія України : [у 3 т.] / редкол.: О. М. Маринич (відповід. ред.) та ін. — К., 1989—1993. — 33 000 екз. — ISBN 5-88500-015-8.
