= Jacob Goldenthal =

Orientalist and university teacher (1815–1867)

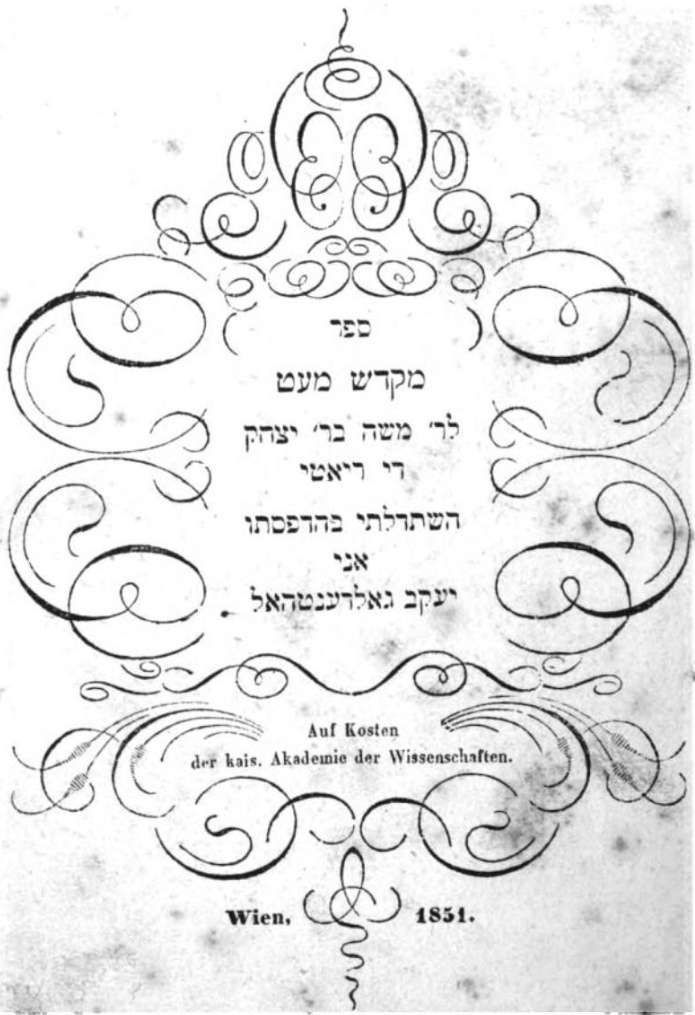
Title page of Moses da Rieti's Mikdash Meat, edited by Goldenthal

Jacob Goldenthal (1815-1868) was an academic orientalist born in the Austro-Hungarian Empire.

Goldenthal was born in 1815 in Brody, a city that is now located in Ukraine. He studied ancient languages at the University of Leipzig and received his Ph.D. there in 1845.

He was principal of the Jewish school in Kishinev (now the capital of Moldova) for three years from 1843. He moved to Vienna and taught oriental languages, religion and literature at the University of Vienna (1849–1868).

== Publications ==
Goldenthal wrote on numerous topics, including medieval Jewish literature, the rhetoric of Aristotle, Maimonides, and ancient philosophy.

- Al-Ghazalis Meisan al-Almal (Leipzig 1839) A German translation of Criterion of Action
- Todrosis hebräische Bearbeitung des Averroesschen Kommentars zu Aristoteles' Rhetorik (1842)
- Kalonymi apologia Maimonidis (1845)
- Nissim ben Jakobs Clavis talmudica (Wien 1847)
- Rieti und Marini oder Dante und Ovid in hebräischer Umkleidung (1851)
