= Volhynian Upland =

Part of the East European Plain in Ukraine

Coordinates: 50°30′N 24°30′E

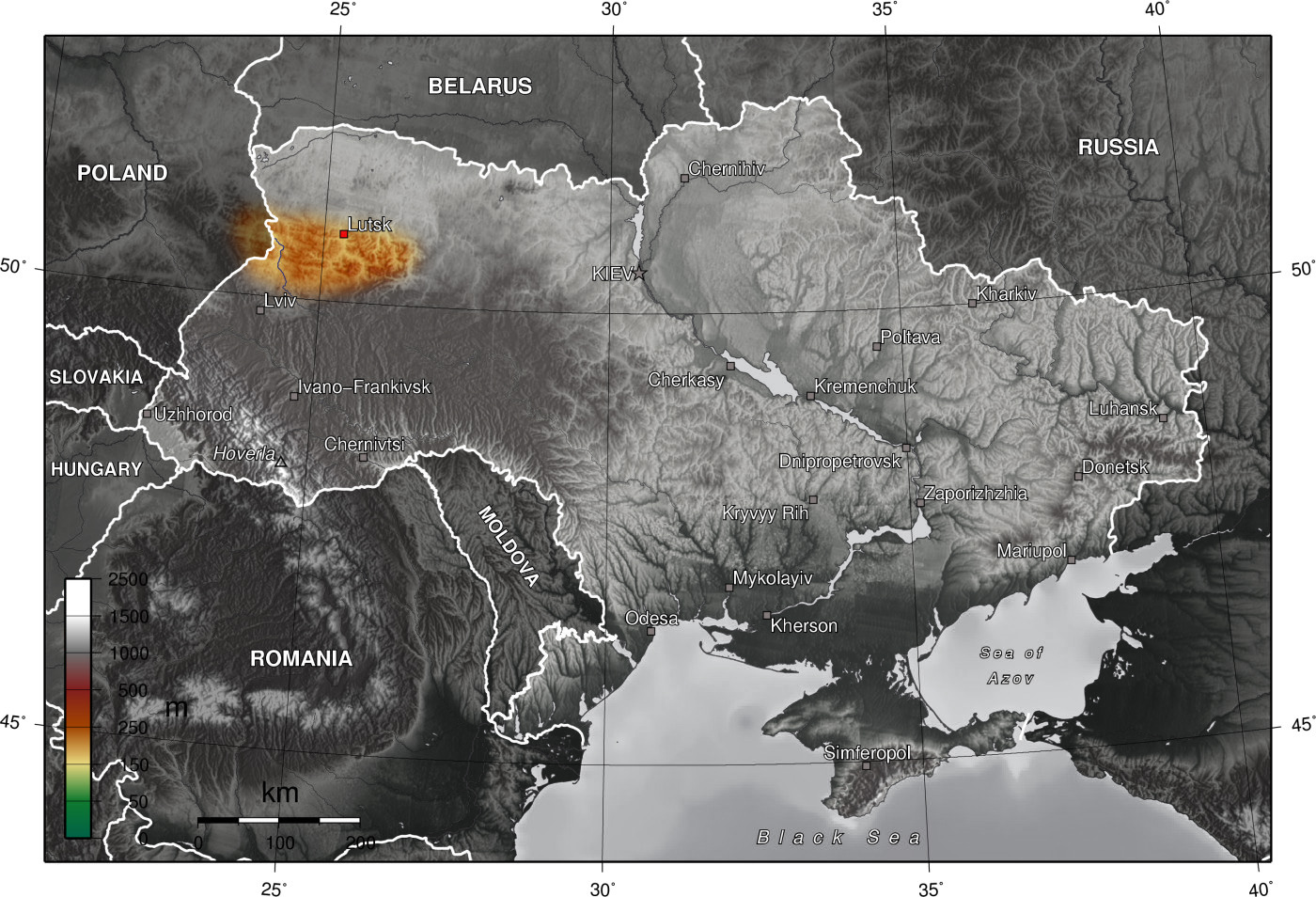
Volhynian Upland

The Volhynian Upland (Ukrainian: Волинська височина, romanized: Volynska vysochyna) is an upland in western Ukraine, with its small northwestern part stretching into eastern Poland.

The Podolian Upland and the Volhynian Upland are sometimes grouped together as the Volhynian-Podolian Upland. These two uplands are separated by a plain called "Little Polesia" (Ukrainian: Мале Полісся).

Volhynian Upland lays between Western Bug and Korchyk River which is a tributary of Sluch River. It stretches for over 200 km (120 mi) with a width around 80 km (50 mi). Average elevation is 220–250 m (720–820 ft) with the maximum being about 360 m (358 or 361 m according to various sources) in the Povcha Upland. Its surface is weakly wavy dissected by wide river valleys and gulches.

Geologically, it consists of Paleozoic deposits overlapped with rocks of Cretaceous system. There are karst forms of relief and in karstic depressions there exist small lakes. There are numerous peat bogs. Among minerals there are chalk, black coal, peat, pegmatites, clays.

The geographic region consists of following distinct smaller sub-regions

- Sokal Hills
- Buh River Upland
- Horodło Hills
- Hrubieszow Valley
- Horokhiv Upland
- Povcha Upland
- Rivne Plateau
- Hoshcha Plateau
- Mizoch Ridge
- Shepetivka Plain
