= Gord (archaeology) =

Medieval Slavonic fortified settlement

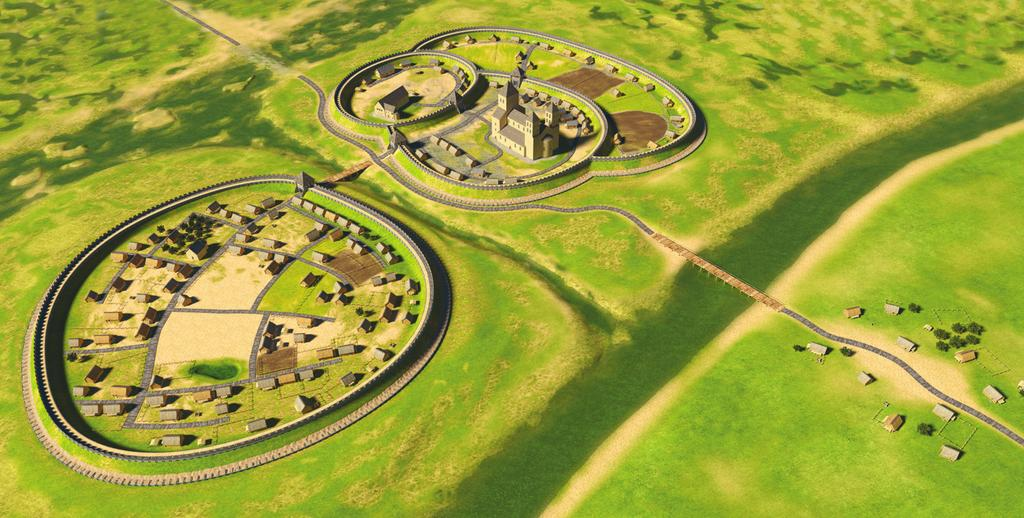
Visualization of the Poznań gród, Poland at the end of the 10th century

A gord is a medieval Slavonic fortified settlement, usually built on strategic sites such as hilltops (a hillfort), riverbanks, lake islets or peninsulas between the 6th and 12th centuries in Central and Eastern Europe. A typical gord consisted of a group of wooden houses surrounded by a wall made of earth and wood, and a palisade running along the top of the bulwark.

== Etymology ==
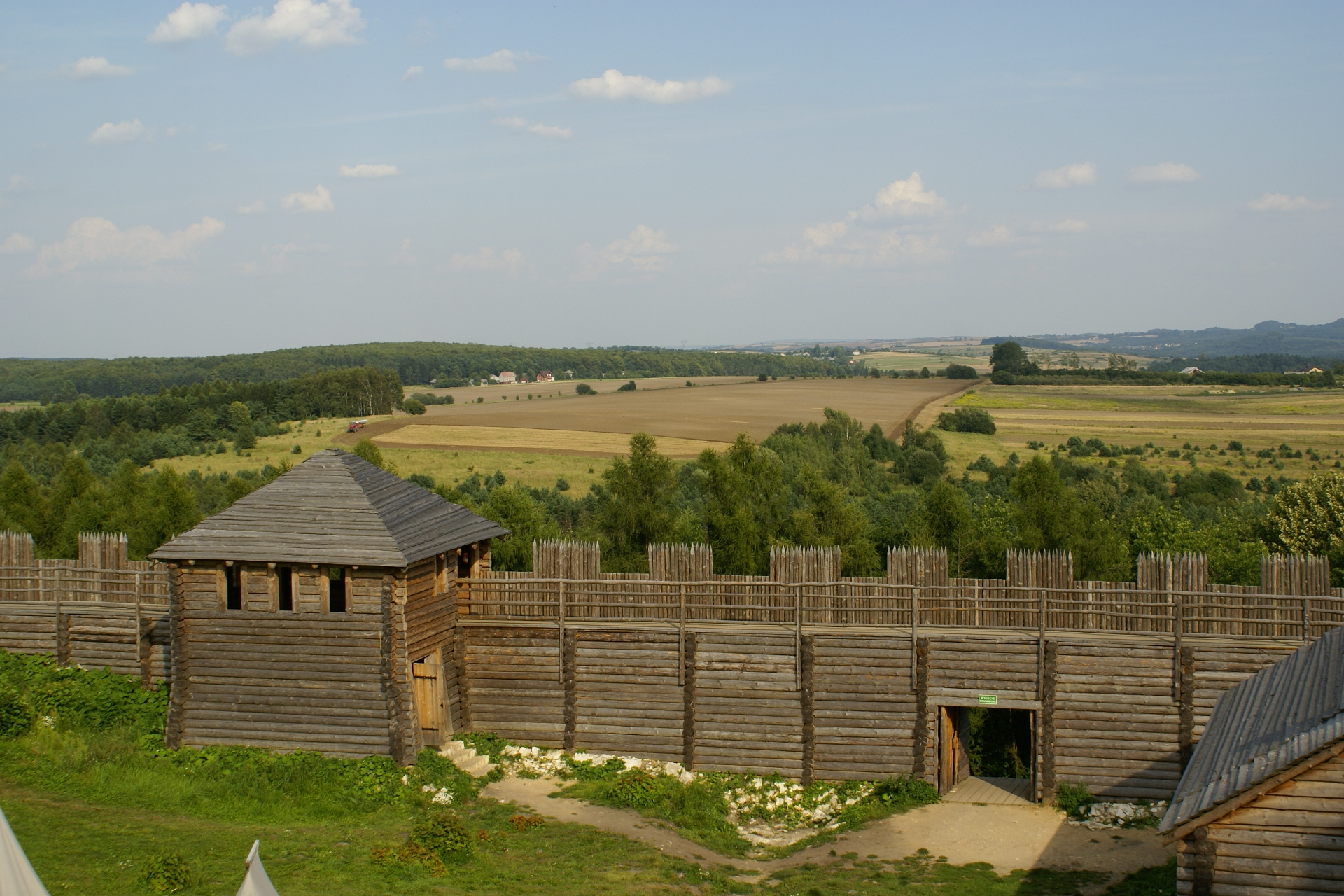
Section of a reconstructed hilltop gród at the village of Birów near Ogrodzieniec, Poland

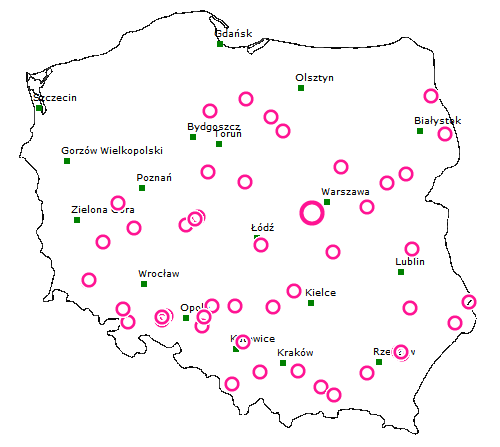
Towns and villages in Poland with names derived from gród (magenta circles)

The term ultimately descends from the reconstructed Proto-Indo-European root *ǵʰortós 'enclosure'. The Proto-Slavic word *gordъ later differentiated into grad (Cyrillic: град), gorod (Cyrillic: город), gród in Polish, gard in Kashubian, etc. It is the root of various words in modern Slavic languages pertaining to fences and fenced-in areas (Belarusian гарадзіць, Ukrainian городити, Slovak ohradiť, Czech ohradit, Russian оградить, Serbo-Croatian ograditi, and Polish ogradzać, grodzić, to fence off). It also has evolved into words for a garden in certain languages.

Additionally, it has furnished numerous modern Slavic words for a city or town:

- Polish gród, plural grody (toponymic; nowadays a town or city is termed miasto, but remnants of a gród are known as grodzisko)
- Ancient Pomeranian and modern Kashubian gard
- Slovak and Czech hrad ("castle" in the modern language), or hradisko/hradiště/hradec, which are terms for gord
- Slovene gradec, grad ("castle" in modern Slovene)
- Belarusian горад (horad)
- Russian город (gorod)
- Ukrainian город (horod, dialectal and toponymic; nowadays misto)
- Bulgarian, Serbo-Croatian, and Macedonian grad/град

The names of many Central and Eastern European cities harken back to their pasts as gords. Some of them are in countries which once were but no longer are mainly inhabited by Slavic-speaking peoples.

Examples include:

- Horodok
- Gorod (toponymy)
- Hrod (toponymy)
- Hrud
- Horod
- Hrad (toponymy)
- Gard (Slavic toponymy)
- Grod (toponymy)
- Grad (toponymy)

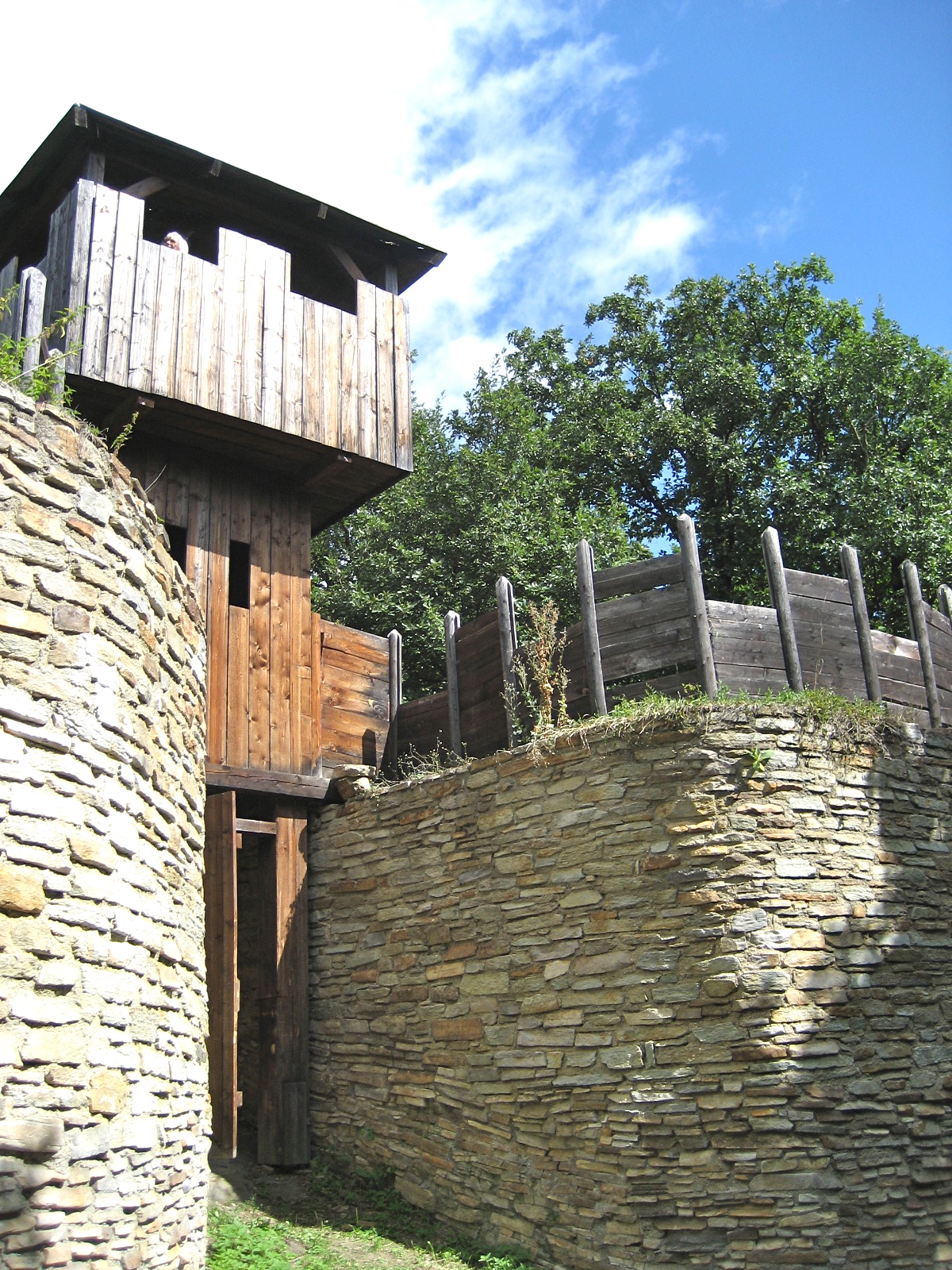
A reconstructed Slavic gord gatehouse in Thunau am Kamp, Austria.

The words in Polish and Slovak for suburbium, podgrodzie and podhradie correspondingly, literally mean a settlement beneath a gord: the gród/hrad was frequently built at the top of a hill, and the podgrodzie/podhradie at its foot. (The Slavic prefix pod-, meaning "under/below" and descending from the Proto-Indo-European root *pṓds, meaning foot, being equivalent to Latin sub-). The word survives in the names of several villages (Podgrodzie, Subcarpathian Voivodeship) and town districts (e.g., that of Olsztyn), as well as in the names of the German municipalities Puttgarden, Wagria and Putgarten, Rügen.

From this same Proto-Indo-European root come the Germanic word elements *gard and *gart (as in Stuttgart), and likely also the names of Graz, Austria and Gartz, Germany. Cognate to these are English words such as garden, yard, garth, girdle and court.

== Construction ==
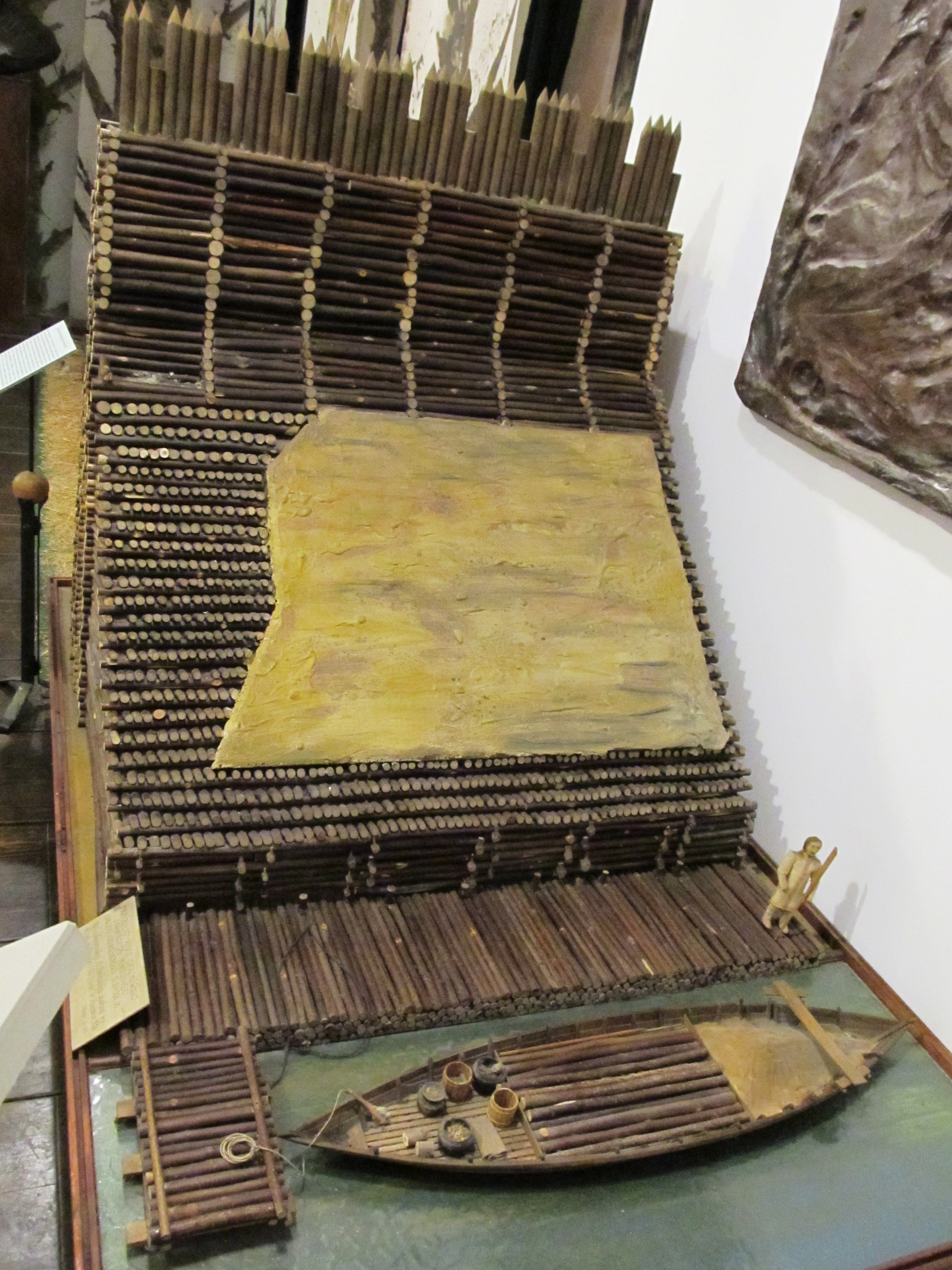
A cross section of early Slavic gród bulwarks and wharf in Gdańsk, Poland

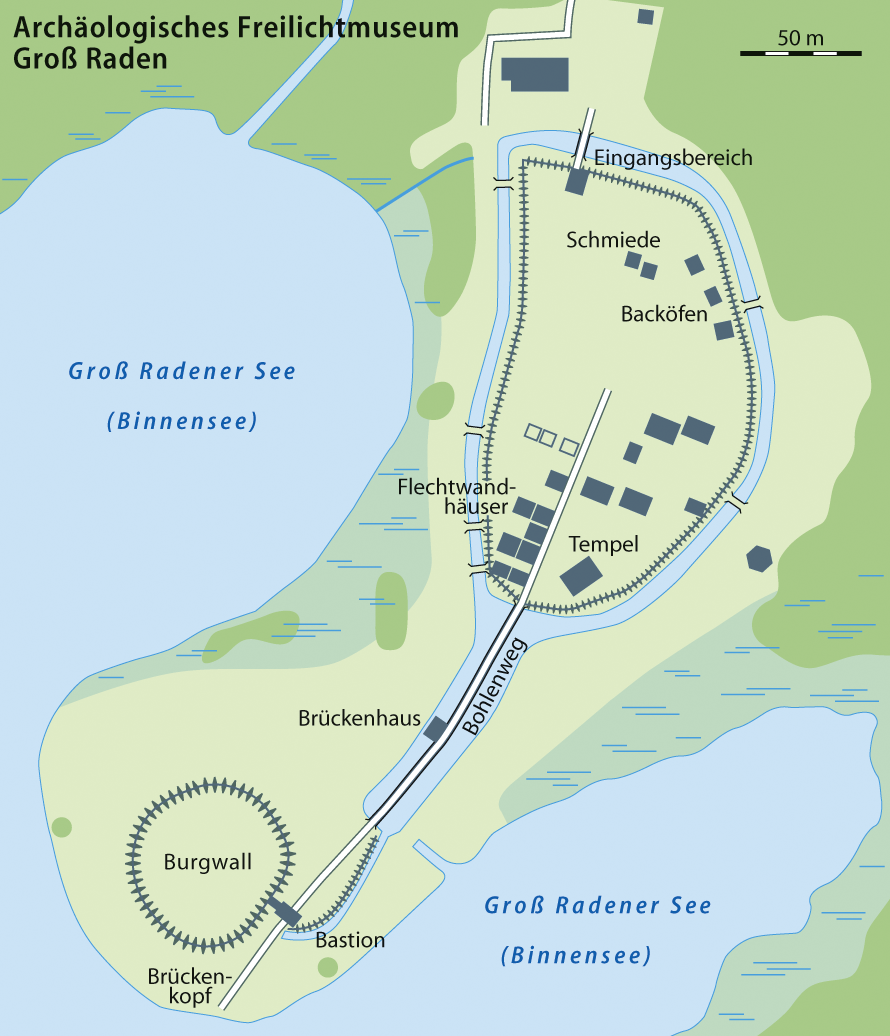
A layout map of the West Slavic fortified settlement (gord) in Groß Raden, Germany

A typical gord was a group of wooden houses built either in rows or in circles, surrounded by one or more rings of walls made of earth and wood, a palisade, and/or moats. Some gords were ring-shaped, with a round, oval, or occasionally polygonal fence or wall surrounding a hollow. Others, built on a natural hill or a man-made mound, were cone-shaped. Those with a natural defense on one side, such as a river or lake, were usually horseshoe-shaped. Most gords were built in densely populated areas on sites that offered particular natural advantages.

As Slavic tribes united to form states, gords were also built for defensive purposes in less-populated border areas. Gords in which rulers resided or that lay on trade routes quickly expanded. Near the gord, or below it in elevation, there formed small communities of servants, merchants, artisans, and others who served the higher-ranked inhabitants of the gord. Each such community was known as a suburbium (literally "undercity") (Polish: podgrodzie). Its residents could shelter within the walls of the gord in the event of danger. Eventually the suburbium acquired its own fence or wall. In the High Middle Ages, the gord usually evolved into a castle, citadel or kremlin, and the suburbium into a town.

Some gords did not stand the test of time and were abandoned or destroyed, gradually turning into more or less discernible mounds or rings of earth (Russian gorodishche, Polish gród or grodzisko, Ukrainian horodyshche, Slovak hradisko, Czech hradiště, German Hradisch, Hungarian hradis and Serbian gradiška/градишка). Notable archaeological sites include Groß Raden in Germany and Biskupin in Poland.

== Important gords in Central and Eastern Europe ==
=== Austria ===
- Thunau am Kamp

=== Belarus ===
- Grodno

=== Czech Republic ===
- Bílina
- Budeč
- Chotěbuz
- Kouřim
- Levý Hradec
- Libice nad Cidlinou
- Libušín
- Mikulčice-Valy
- Prague Castle
- Rubín
- Stará Boleslav
- Staré Zámky
- Tetín
- Uherské Hradiště
- Vyšehrad (Prague)

=== Germany ===
==== Rügen ====
- the fort at Cape Arkona – the Jaromarsburg
- Garz Castle
- the fort of Charenza near Venz in the municipality of Trent
- the Herthaburg near the Stubbenkammer in the Jasmund National Park

==== Mecklenburg-Western Pomerania ====
- Mecklenburg Castle in the village of Dorf Mecklenburg near Wismar (origin of the state name)
- the fort of Groß Raden near Sternberg
- the fort of Behren-Lübchin, partly reconstructed in the Groß Raden Archaeological Open Air Museum
- Gädebehn Castle (Gemeinde Knorrendorf) in the county of Mecklenburgische Seenplatte
- Ganschendorf Castle (Gemeinde Sarow) in the county of Mecklenburgische Seenplatte
- the fort of Grapenwerder (Gemeinde Penzlin) in the county of Mecklenburgische Seenplatte
- Quadenschönfeld Castle in the county of Mecklenburgische Seenplatte
- Neu Nieköhr Castle (Gemeinde Behren-Lübchin) in the county of Rostock
- the fort of Neu-Kentzlin (Gemeinde Kentzlin) between Demmin und Stavenhagen
- Mölln Castle (Gemeinde Mölln (Mecklenburg)) in the county of Mecklenburgische Seenplatte
- Möllenhagen Castle (Gemeinde Möllenhagen) in the county of Mecklenburgische Seenplatte
- the Ravensburg (Neubrandenburg)
- the forts at Kastorfer See near Neubrandenburg
- the island fort in the Teterower See
- the Schlossberg near Feldberg
- the Slavic fort near Menkendorf, a village in the parish of Grebs-Niendorf
- Wittenborn Castle ( municipality of Galenbeck) in the county of Mecklenburgische Seenplatte
- Kieve Castle in the county of Mecklenburgische Seenplatte
- Wulfsahl Castle in the county of Ludwigslust-Parchim

==== Berlin-Brandenburg ====
- Brandenburg Castle
- Spandau Castle (Berlin)
- the Römerschanze near Potsdam
- the Reitweiner Wallberge, fortanlage near Reitwein in the Landkreis Märkisch-Oderland
- the Slavic fort of Lübben
- the Slavic fort of Raddusch near Vetschau/Spreewald
- the Slavic fort of Tornow
- Lossow Castle, Frankfurt (Oder)
- the fort near Kliestow

==== Saxony-Anhalt ====
- the fort of Altes Dorf in the Magdeburg subdistrict of Pechau
- Wust Castle

==== Schleswig-Holstein ====
- List of Early Middle Ages castles in Hamburg und Schleswig-Holstein including:
- the fort of the Slavic settlement of Starigard in present-day Oldenburg – Oldenburger Wall

==== Bavaria ====
- Rauher Kulm

=== Poland ===
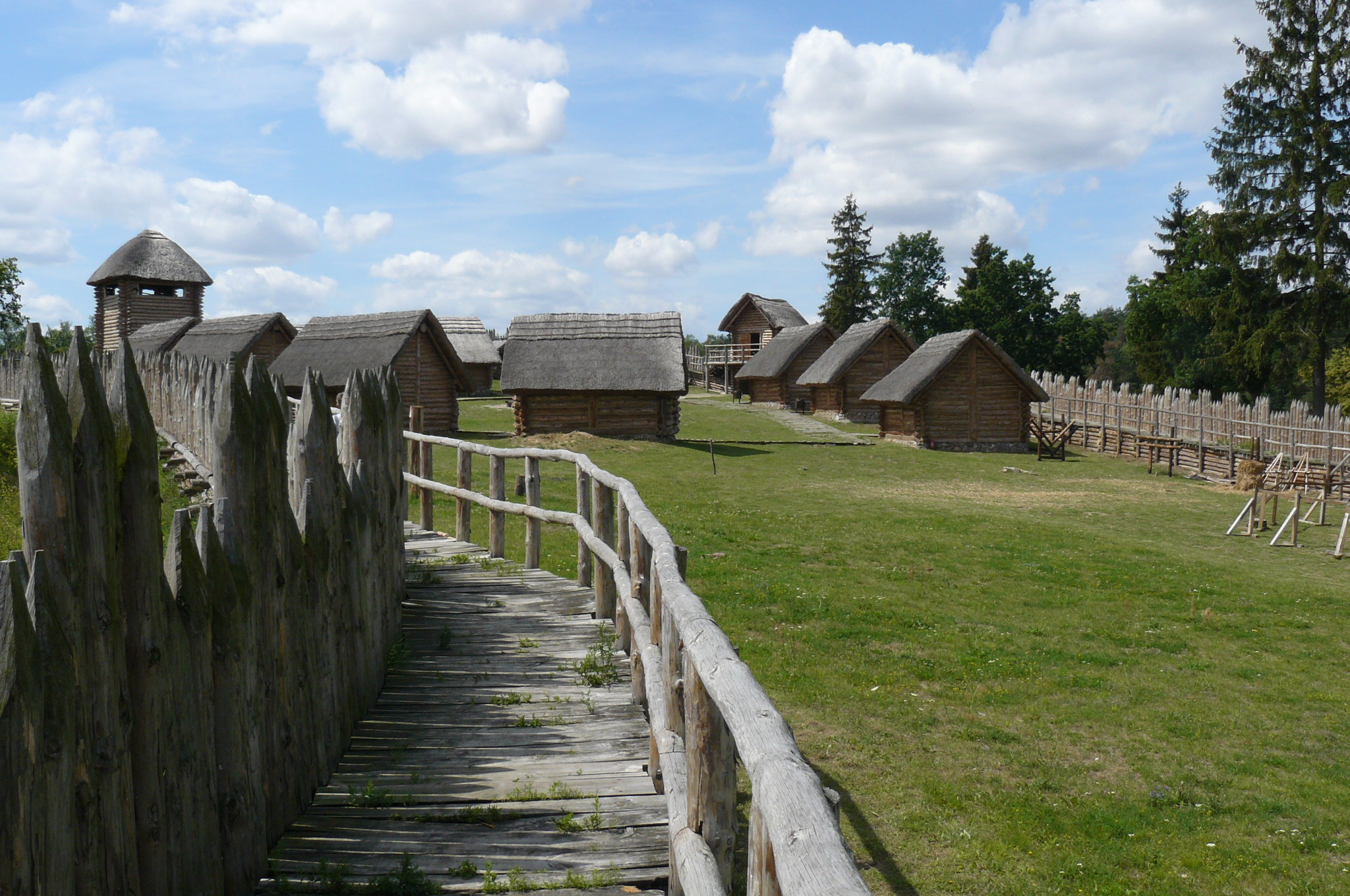
Part of the reconstructed gard in Owidz, Kociewie region, Poland

- Bnin
- Cherven grods
- Gdańsk
- Giecz
- Gniezno
- Grudziądz
- Grzybowo
- Kałdus
- Kołobrzeg
- Kraków
- Ostrów Lednicki
- Owidz
- Poznań
- Przemyśl
- Radom
- Rozprze
- Starogard Gdański
- Stradów
- Szprotawa
- Szczecin
- Włocławek
- Wolin
- Wrocław

=== Russia ===
- Novgorod

=== Slovakia ===
- Ducové

=== Ukraine ===
- Belz
- Bilhorod-Kyivskyi
- Bohuslavl
- Buzhsk
- Chernihiv
- Dorohobuzh
- Halych
- Hlukhiv
- Horodets Osterskyi
- Iskorosten
- Kaniv
- Korsun
- Kyiv
- Liubech
- Liuboml
- Ltava
- Luben
- Mezhybozhe
- Novhorod-Siverskyi
- Ostroh
- Pereiaslav
- Peresopnytsia
- Plisnensk
- Pryluk
- Putyvl
- Romen
- Terebovl
- Torchesk
- Trepol
- Unenizh
- Vasyliv
- Volodymyr
- Vruchiy
- Vyshhorod
- Vyr
- Yuriv
- Zvenyhorod

== See also ==
- Oppidum, a type of similar but often much bigger fortified wooden settlement used by ancient Celts and Germanic peoples.
- Gordoservon in Asia Minor, 680 AD
- Garðaríki – Varangian name for Kievan Rus, interpreted as "cities"
- Biskupin, a life-size reconstruction of a gord-like Lusatian culture settlement in Poland.
- Kraal (South Africa);
- Motte-and-bailey (Western Europe).
- Burgh, Borough, Burg or bjerg (Scotland, England, Germany, Denmark)
- Ringfort (Ireland, Britain, Scandinavia)
