= Grod =

Grod may refer to:

- Caspar Maria Grod, Wilhelm Riphahn's co-worker from 1913 to 1931
- Weilern Grod, a village in Brittnau, Switzerland
- Grod (Gordas) son of Tatra (Ngrod son of Tana), c. 503–528 ruler of the Huns of Keremi (Crimea; the earliest mention of the Keremi name which Kuber would later carry from Srem to Keramisia) after Ernakh in Patria Onoguria. Ingrod visited Constantinople, converted to Christianity and began to suppress the native cults among the Keremi. His nobles overthrew and murdered him. He was succeeded by his son Mugel (528–530s). Grod Island in Antarctica is named after him.
- Grod (toponymy), Slavic toponyms
- Gord (archaeology)
- Grod, one of the heads of the four-faced deity Grob Gob Glob Grod from Adventure Time

== See also ==
- Gord (disambiguation)
- Grodd, a DC Comics supervillain
