= Hrad =

Hrad may refer to:

- Hrad (castle), meaning "castle" in Czech and Slovak
- Hrad (politics), in the politics of Czechoslovakia and later the Czech Republic
- Hrad (toponymy), a Czech toponym
- Prague Castle (Czech: Pražský hrad)
- Hrad (film), a 1955 Indian Bengali-language film
- abbreviation of hectoradian (hrad), a unit of angle
- abbreviation of hectorad (hrad), a unit of radiation dose
