= Dorogobuzh (disambiguation) =

Dorogobuzh is a town in Smolensk Oblast, Russia.

Dorogobuzh may also refer to:

- Dorohobuzh, Rivne Oblast, a big village in Rivne Oblast, Ukraine
- Dorogobuzh, Novgorod Oblast, a village in Batetsky District, Novgorod Oblast, Russia
