= Brynjar =

Given name

Brynjar is a given name. Notable people with the name include:

- Brynjar Aa, often Brynjar Å, (born 1960), Norwegian dramatist
- Brynjar Ingi Bjarnason (born 1999), Icelandic footballer
- Brynjar Þór Björnsson (born 1988), Icelandic basketball player
- Brynjar Guðmundsson (born 1989), alpine skier from Iceland
- Brynjar Gunnarsson (born 1975), Icelandic former footballer
- Brynjar Hoff (born 1940), Norwegian oboist
- Brynjar Kristinsson (born 1988), Icelandic cross-country skier
- Thorarinn Brynjar Kristjansson (born 1980), Icelandic professional football player
- Brynjar Kvaran (born 1958), Icelandic former Olympic handball player
- Brynjar Leifsson (born 1990), Icelandic musician
- Brynjar Lia (born 1966), Norwegian historian, professor at the University of Oslo
- Brynjar Meling (born 1967), Norwegian lawyer
- Brynjar Níelsson (born 1960), Icelandic politician, member of the Althing
- Brynjar Rasmussen (born 1977), Norwegian jazz musician (clarinet)

== See also ==
- Brnjare
- Bryja
- Bryn (disambiguation)
