= Piotrówka Hill Fort =

Piotrówka hillfort in Radom Poland

Piotrówka Hillfort
- Grodzisko Piotrówka
- Poland
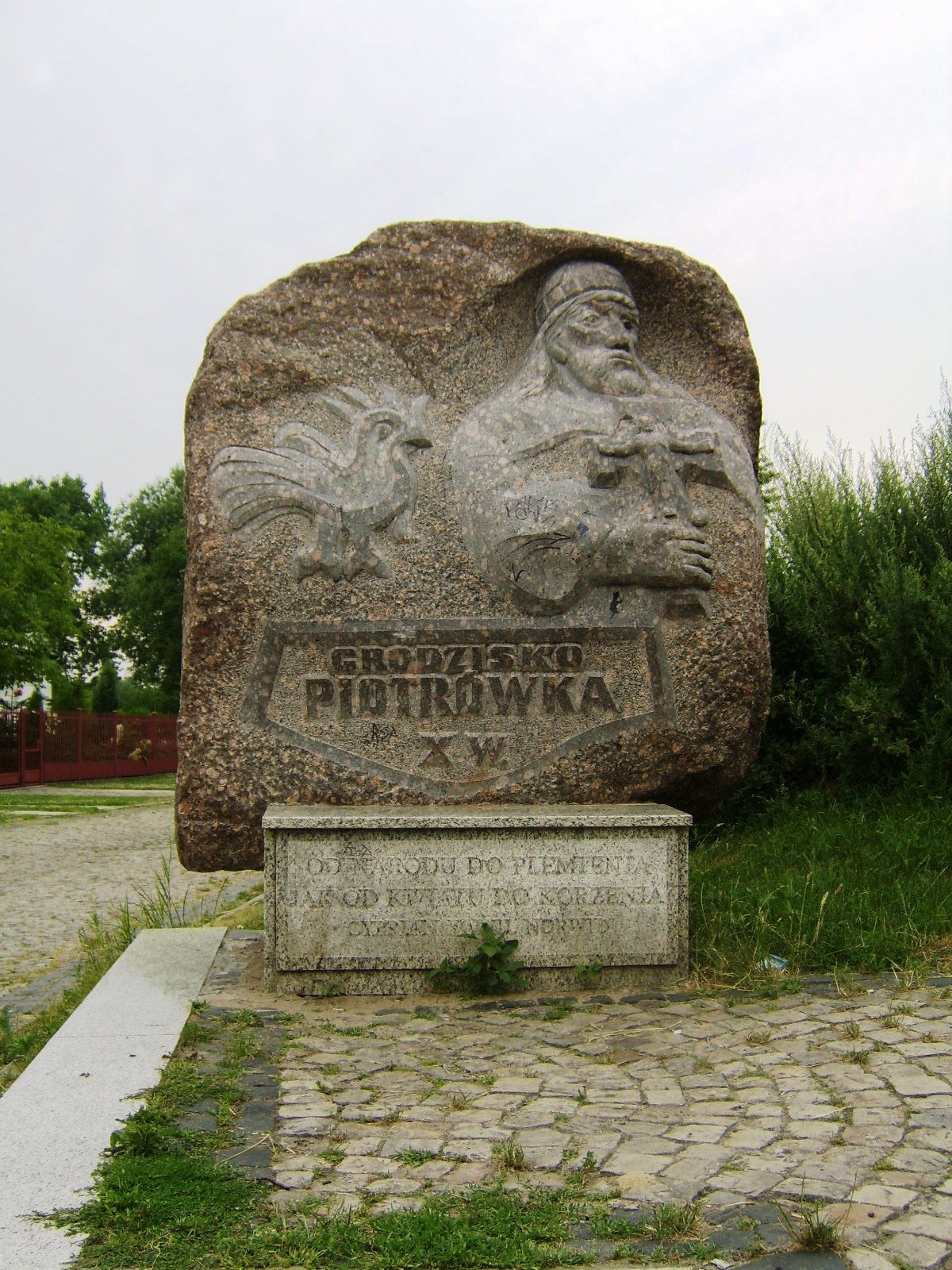

Site information
- Type: Hillfort
- Condition: Park, archaeological site

Location
- Coordinates: 51°23′59.6″N 21°07′59.8″E

Site history
- Built: 10th century

Garrison information
- Designations: Register of monuments

The Piotrówka Hillfort is a medieval hillfort located near Radom, Poland. It is one of the earliest elements of Radom's history and is a protected monument in Poland. The site held the first Christian church in the region and features archaeological significance including a coin hoard.

== Name ==
The site once housed a small church named for St. Peter, and the settlement itself adopted this name.

== History ==
The original settlement of Radom dates to the 8th century and evolved into the Piotrówka hillfort in the 10th century. In the mid-14th century, the castle portion of Piotrówka was destroyed around the time of a Lithuanian attack. Radom was then legally established in the 1360s, several hundred years after Piotrówka initially emerged.

A cemetery was added to the site in 1795.

In 2018, iconic wooden poles that symbolized the hillfort had to be removed due to disrepair. In 2021, the city announced plans for a new cultural park at the site.

== Archaeology ==
=== Piotrówka hoard ===
The hoard predates 1350. It contained coins from Bohemia, groschen of Wenceslaus II, and more than twenty Polish pennies.

=== Medieval culture ===
Archaeological work at the site has revealed the types of foods consumed by the original residents. Diets featured foods like bryja, spinach, and oregano.

== See also ==
- Gord
- Christianization of Poland
