= Hrod (toponymy) =

Slavic toponyms

Hrod or Gord (archaeology) is a version of the Slavic word meaning town, city or castle. It is mostly found in Czech, Slovak, Belarusian and Ukrainian, which, unlike the other Slavic languages, do not use hard 'g' except in loanwords. It is preserved in the toponymy of numerous Slavic countries:

- Hrodna
