= Grzybowo Manor House =

Manor house in Grzybów
- dwór w Grzybowie
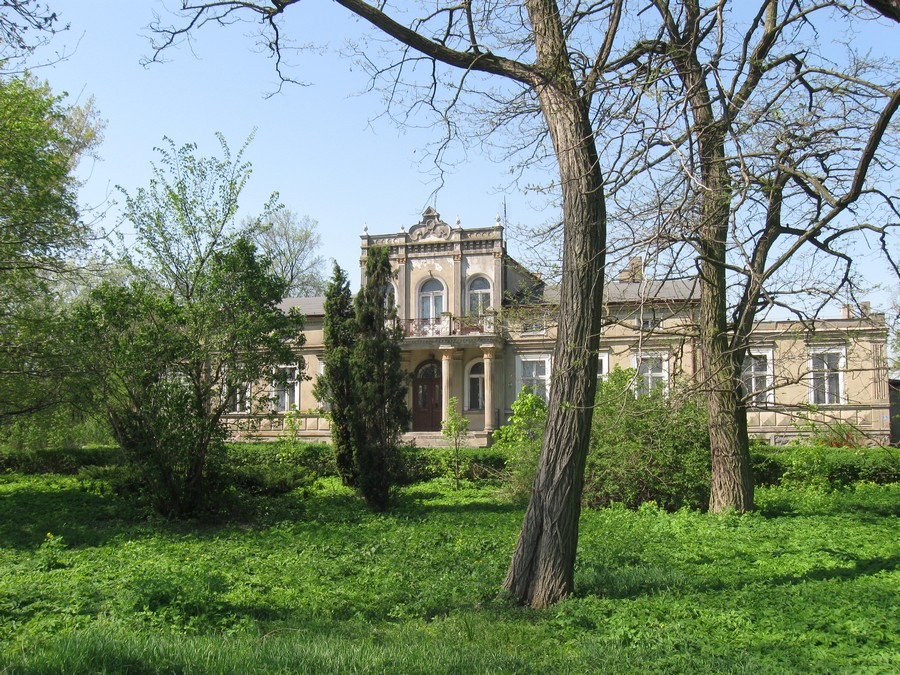

- Location within Poland

General information
- Type: Manor house
- Location: Grzybowo, Poland
- Coordinates: 52°21′46.05″N 17°38′30.48″E

Mansion in Grzybów is a Mansion located in Rabieżyce, the southern part of the Grzybowo village, in Wielkopolska province. It is located at a distance of 7 km from the Wrzesnia. Within a short walk from the mansion is a historic park with an area of 0.9 hectares.

== Gallery ==
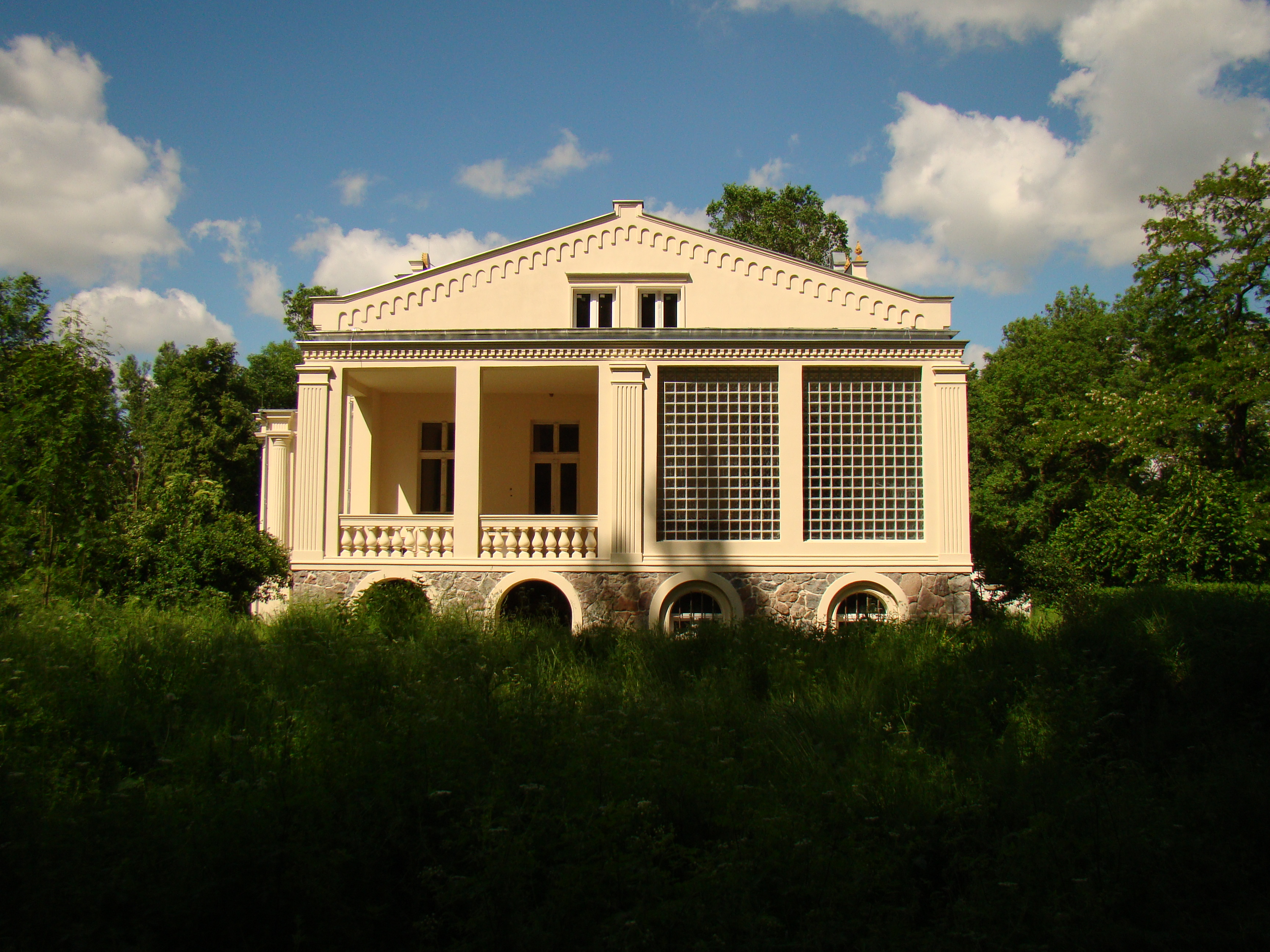
Manor house from the West

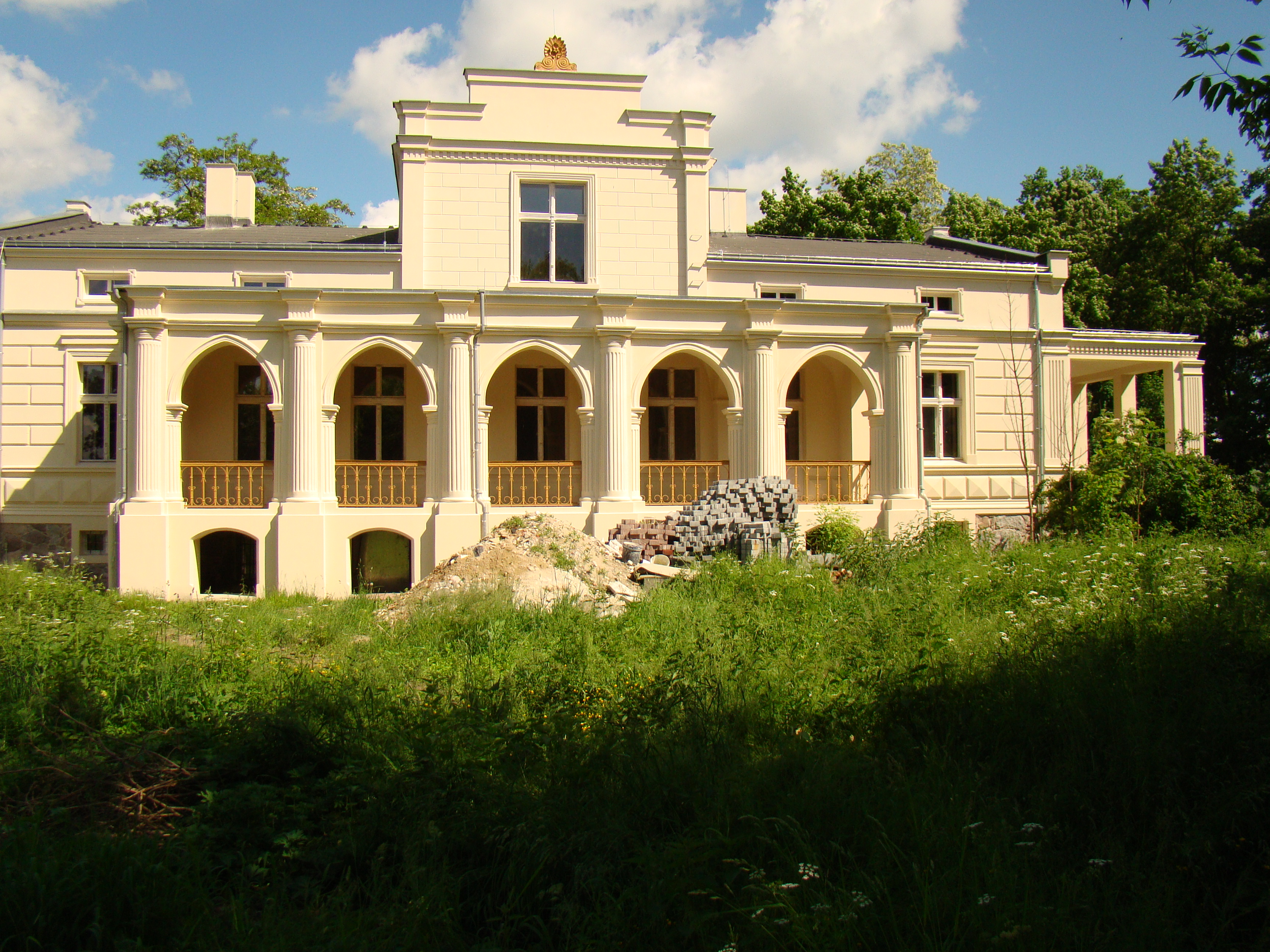
Manor house from the South

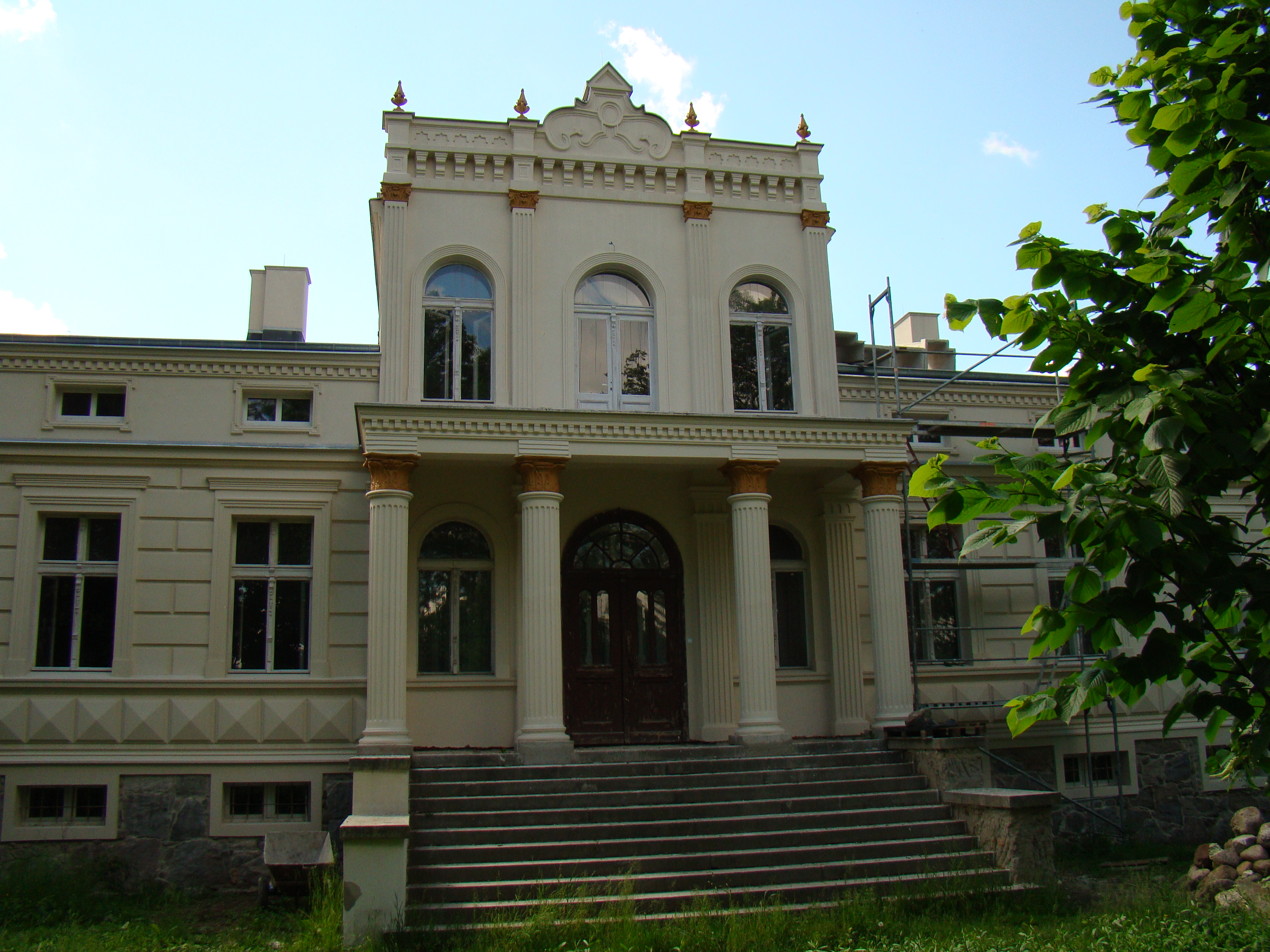
Manor house from the North

Vector graphic

== Sources ==
- Libicki, Marcin; Libicki, Piotr (2003). Dwory i pałace wiejskie w Wielkopolsce (in Polish). Rebis Dom Wydawniczy. ISBN 978-83-7301-243-1.
