= Dorohobuzh, Rivne Oblast =

Coordinates: 50°37′N 26°34′E

Dorohobuzh Дорогобуж
- Village
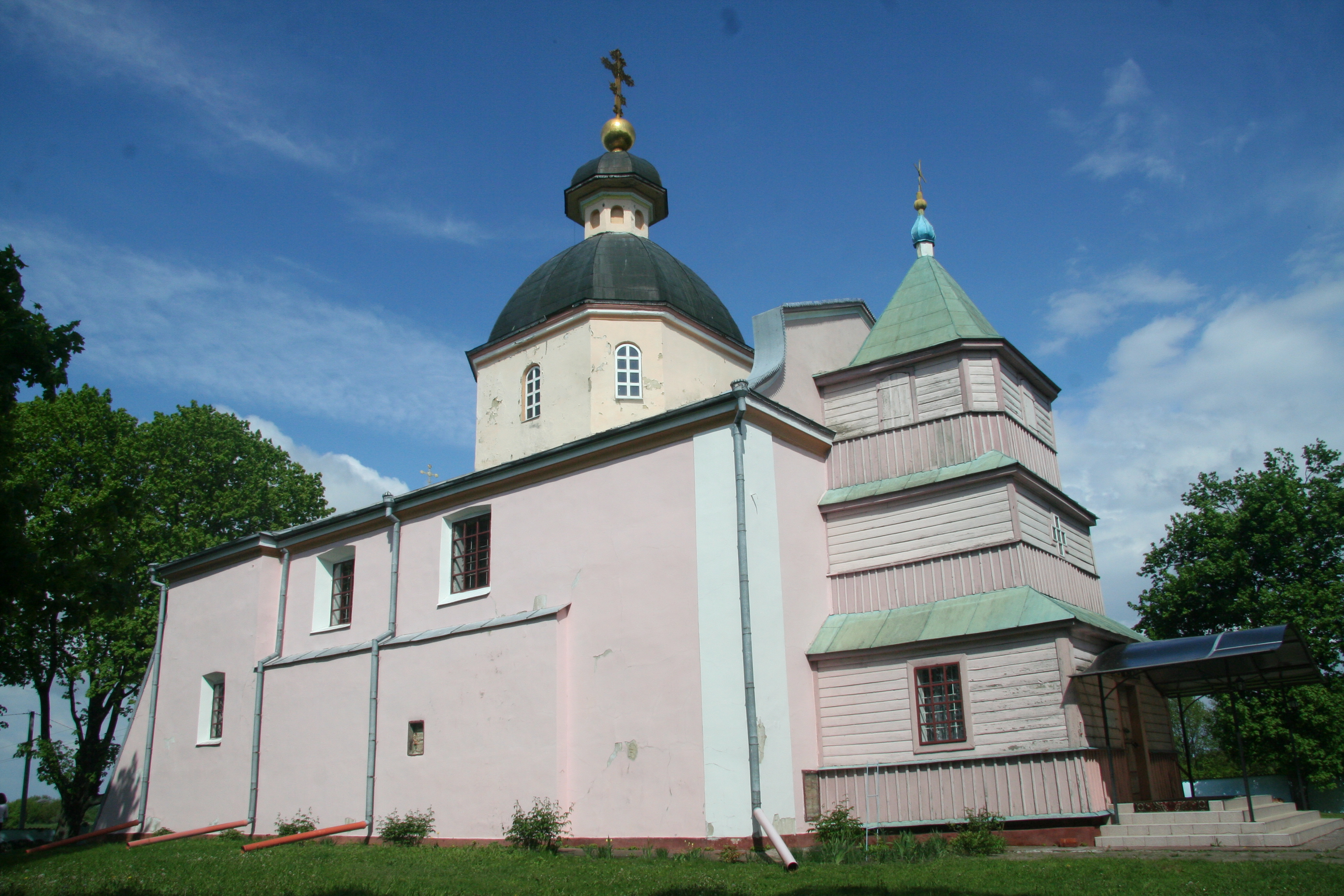
- Dormition Church
- Interactive map of Dorohobuzh
- Country: Ukraine
- Oblast: Rivne Oblast
- Raion: Rivne Raion
- Hromada: Babyn rural hromada

Population
  - Total: 663

Dorohobuzh (Ukrainian: Дорогобуж, Polish: Drohobuż) is a village in Rivne Oblast in western Ukraine, located fourteen km from the town of Hoshcha. Until 2020 it belonged to Hoshcha Raion, afterwards to Rivne Raion. The settlement was first mentioned in 1084. Its name probably originates from the combination of words "Dorog + Bug (Buzh)", which in Ukrainian and Russian means "route to the Bug". In 11th–13th centuries, in the place of the modern village, there existed a Kievan Rus' city which served as the capital of the Principality of Dorogobuzh, a part of the Kingdom of Galicia–Volhynia.

Now the estimate of village population is 663.

The Dormition Church in Dorohobuzh was built in the second half of 12th century during the Kievan Rus' era, and was partially ruined during the Mongol invasion. In 16th century, a new church was built in its place, incorporating the surviving parts of the old walls.
