= Hoshcha =

Rural locality in Rivne Oblast, Ukraine

Hoshcha Гоща
- Rural settlement
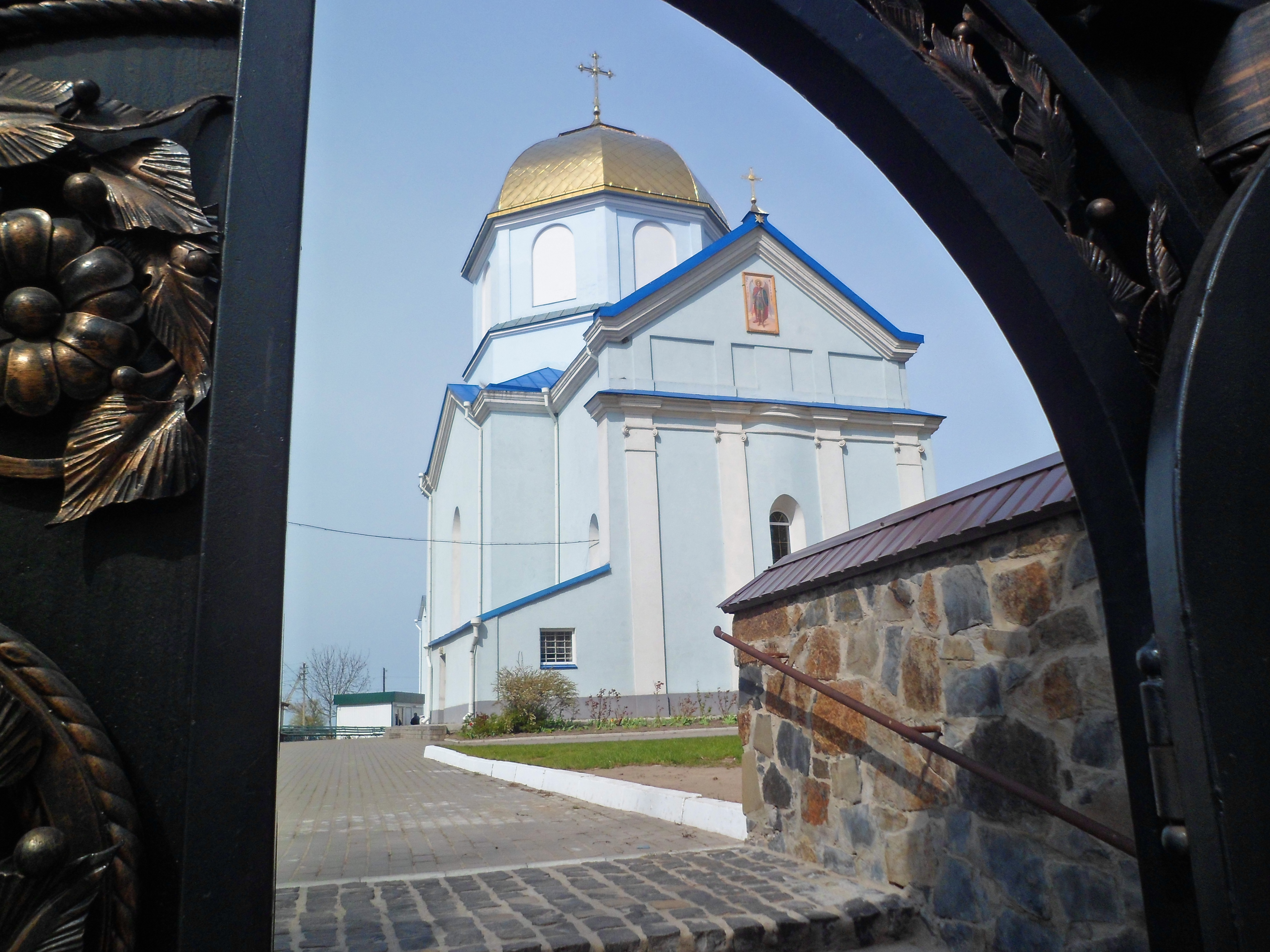
- Saint Michael's Church

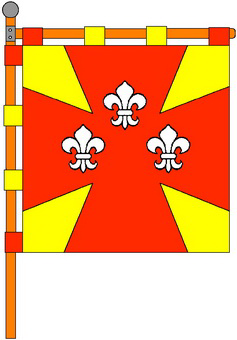
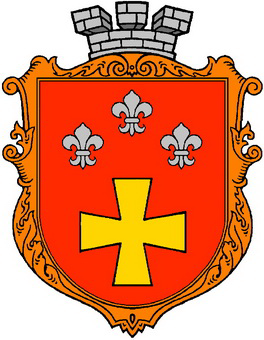
- Flag Coat of arms

- Location of Hoshcha in Ukraine Hoshcha (Ukraine)
- Coordinates: 50°35′55″N 26°40′31″E
- Country: Ukraine
- Oblast: Rivne Oblast
- District: Rivne Raion
- Hromada: Hoshcha settlement hromada
- Founded: 1152
- Town status: 1957

Government
  - Mayor: Mykola Panchuk

Area
  - Total: 7.09 km^{2} (2.74 sq mi)
- Elevation: 192 m (630 ft)

Population (2001)
  - Total: 5,121
  - Density: 722/km^{2} (1,870/sq mi)
- Time zone: UTC+2 (EET)
  - Summer (DST): UTC+3 (EEST)
- Postal code: 35400
- Area code: +380 3650
- Website: http://rada.gov.ua/

Hoshcha (Ukrainian: Гоща) is a rural settlement in Rivne Oblast (province) in western Ukraine. It is located on the Horyn river in the historical region of Volhynia.

Until the 2020 administrative reform it served as the administrative center of Hoshcha Raion (district), housing the district's local administration buildings.

Its population was 5,121 at the 2001 Ukrainian Census. Current population: 5,260 (2022 estimate).

== History ==
Hoshcha was founded in 1152. Historical mentions of the settlement come from the 15th century. During the 17th century a Socinian school functioned here. In 1638 a male Orthodox monastery with a school was established in Hoshcha by princess Regina Salomirecka. In the 18th century the convent was transferred to the Uniate Basilian monks, with the school continuing to function. A wonderworking icon of Virgin Mary stemming from Hoshcha was later transferred to Pochaiv Lavra. A sugar factory functioned in the town.

Under the Soviet rule Hoshcha served as a district centre. It acquired the status of an urban-type settlement in 1957. On 26 January 2024, a new law entered into force which abolished this status, and Hoshcha became a rural settlement.

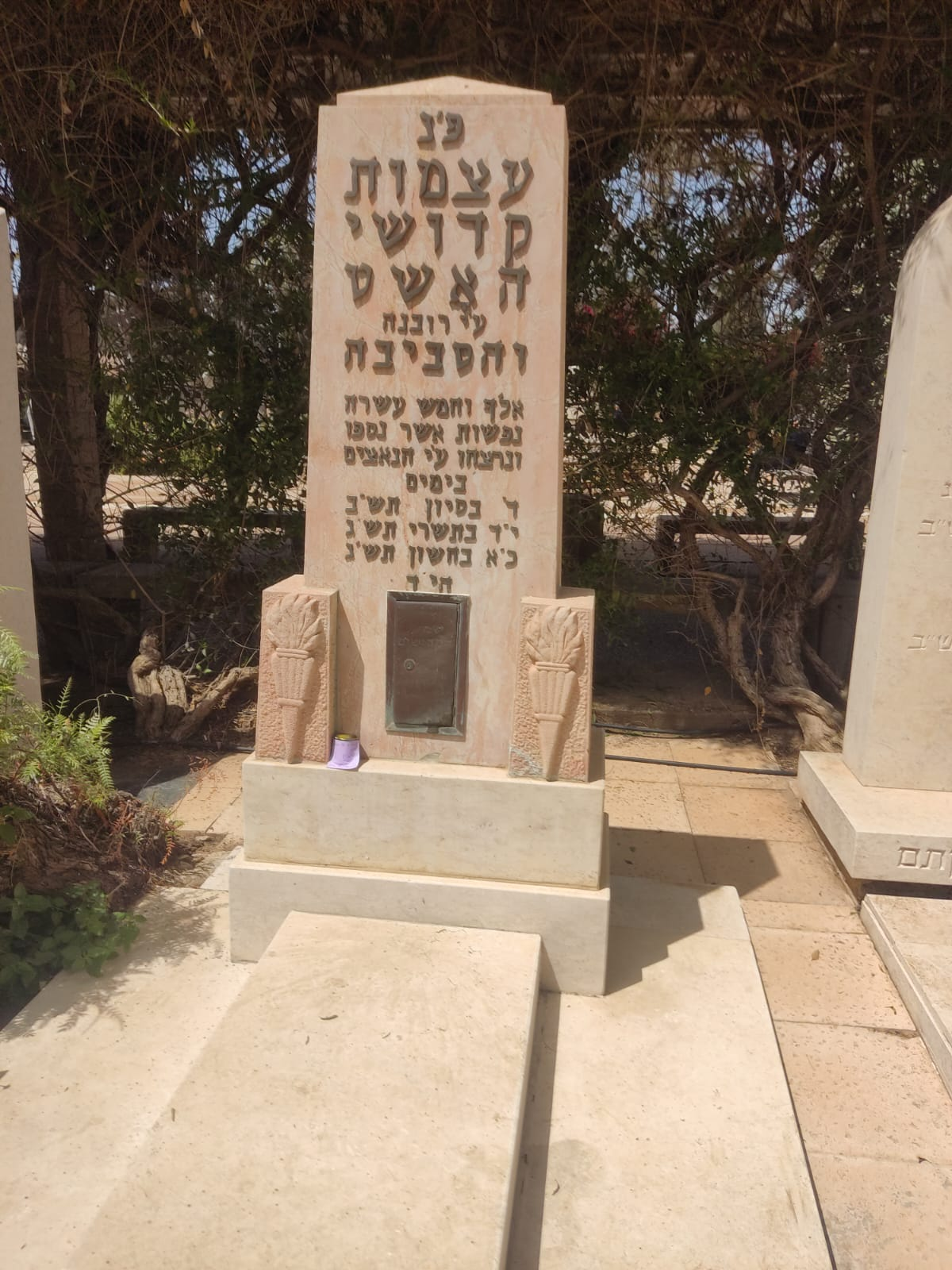
A monument in Kiryat Shaul Cemetery in Tel Aviv in memory of the Jews of Hoshcha who were murdered in the Holocaust

=== Jewish community ===
At the outbreak of World War II, Jewish refugees from the area arrived in the town. On June 29, 1941, after Operation Barbarossa, the town was bombed by German planes, killing 165 Jews. On July 4, the Germans entered the town, and began abducting Jews there for forced labor, and murdering other Jews. The town's Jews were soon ordered to wear an armband with a Star of David, and a Judenrat was appointed in the town. Later, the town's Jews were transferred to an open ghetto.

In the first collection carried out by Ukrainian police in the town, on May 20, 1942, about 400 Jews were murdered. In the second gathering, held on September 25, 1942, about 350 Jews were murdered. In the third gathering held on November 14, 1942, 123 Jews were murdered. And about twenty Jewish professionals left in the town were murdered on July 17, 1943.

On January 18, 1944, the town was liberated by the Red Army. About twenty of the town's Jews survived hiding in the woods. Due to hostilities on the part of the local Ukrainians, these did not return to live in the town.

== Gallery ==
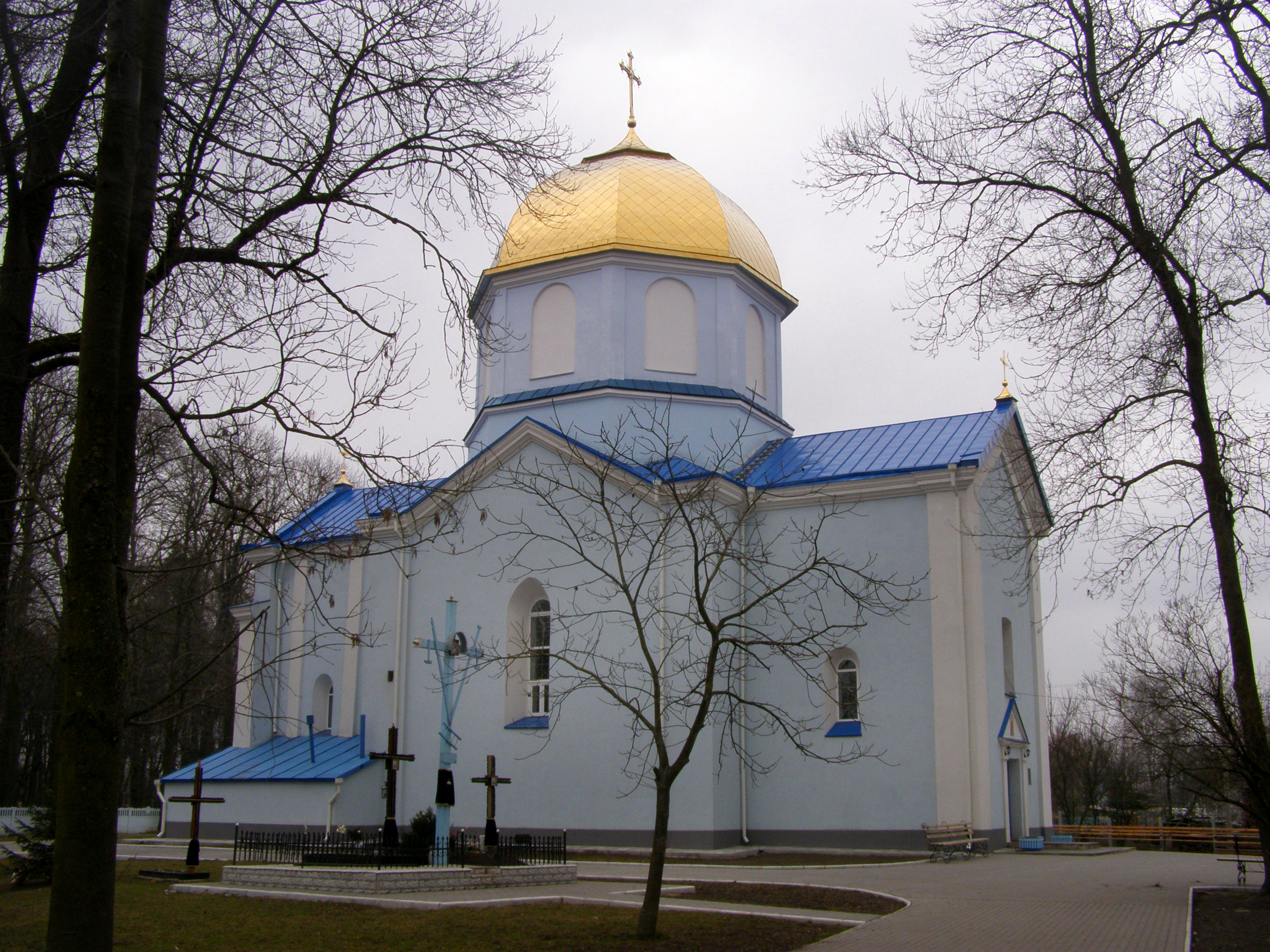
St. Michael's Church

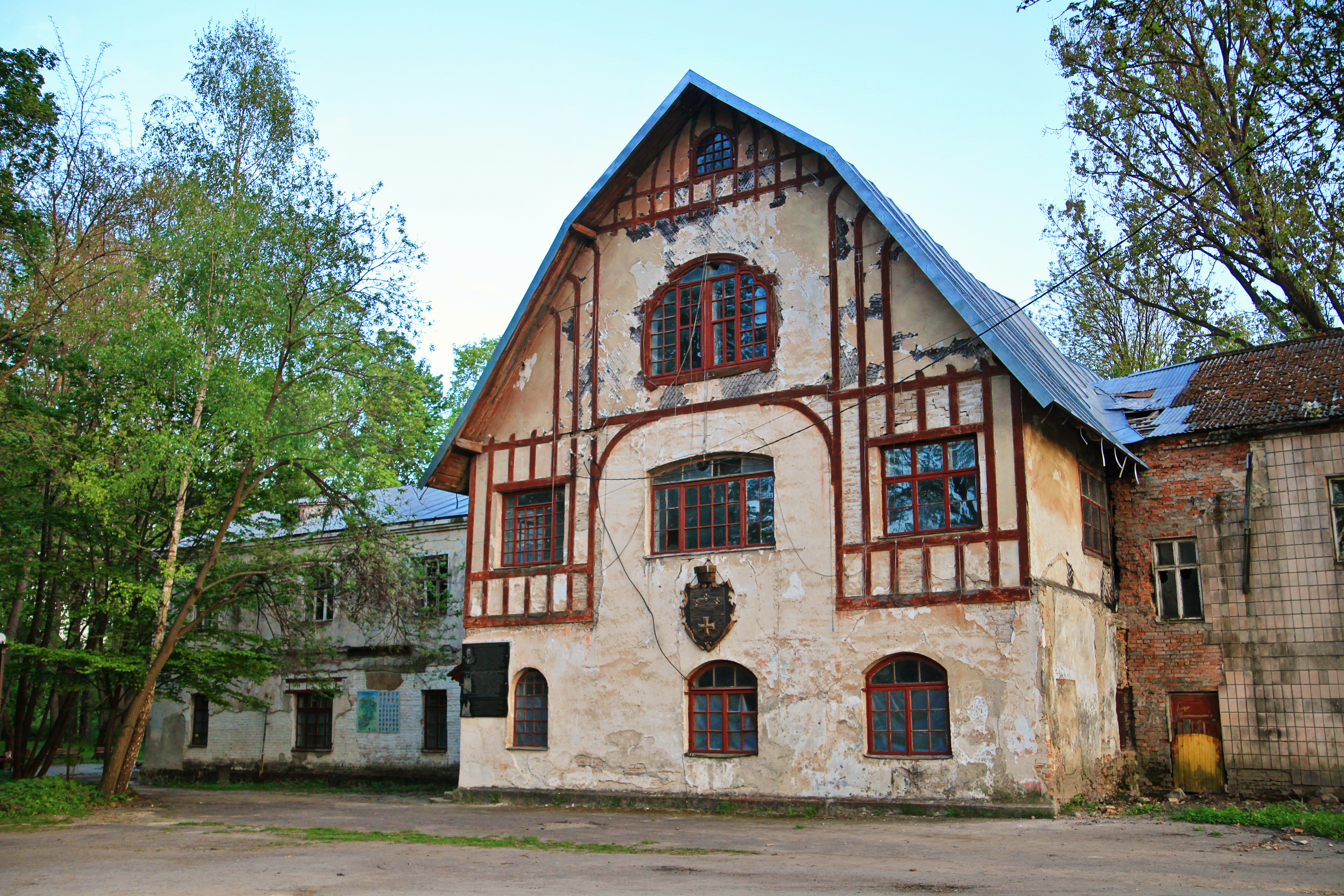
Former manor of the Walewski family

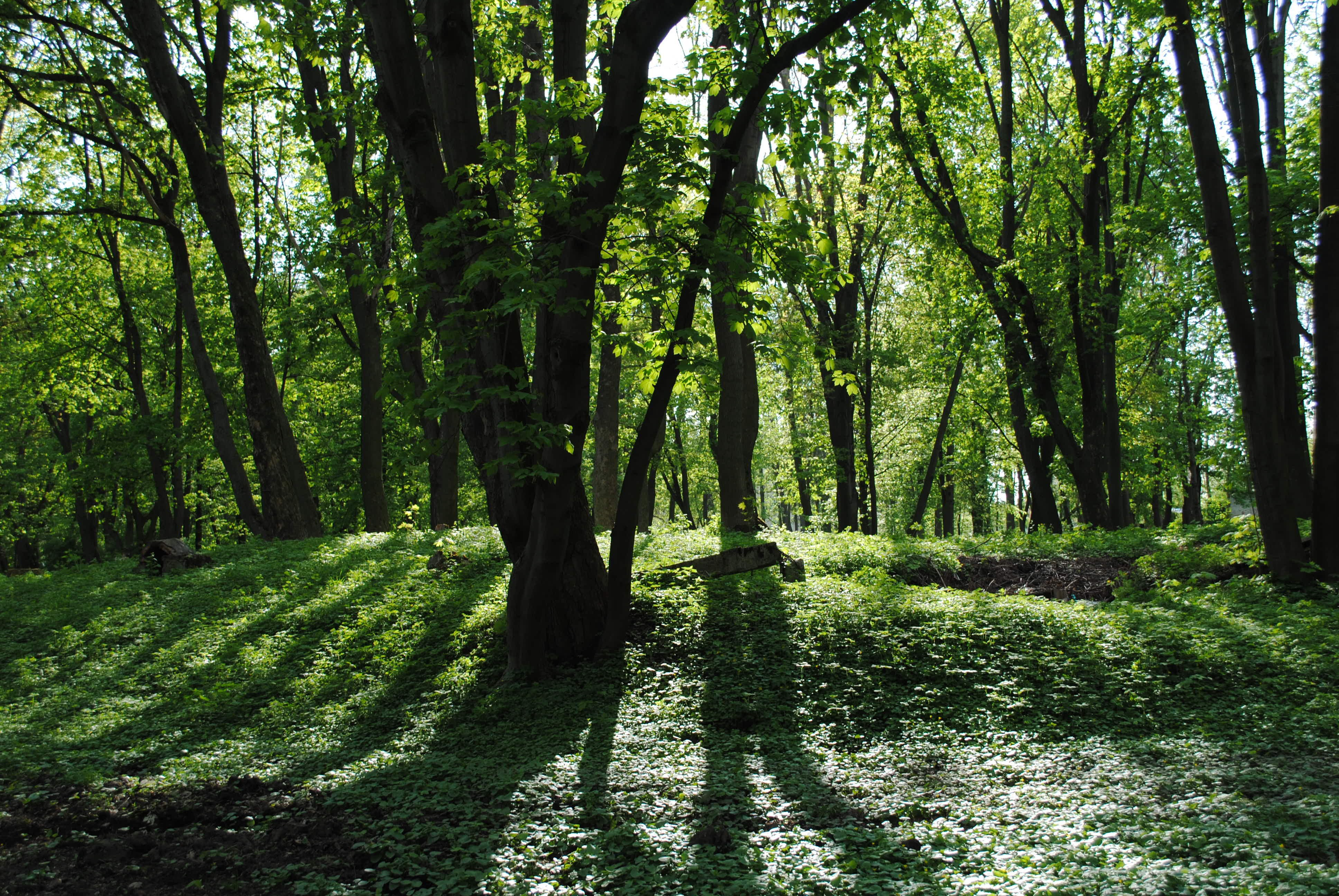
Manor park

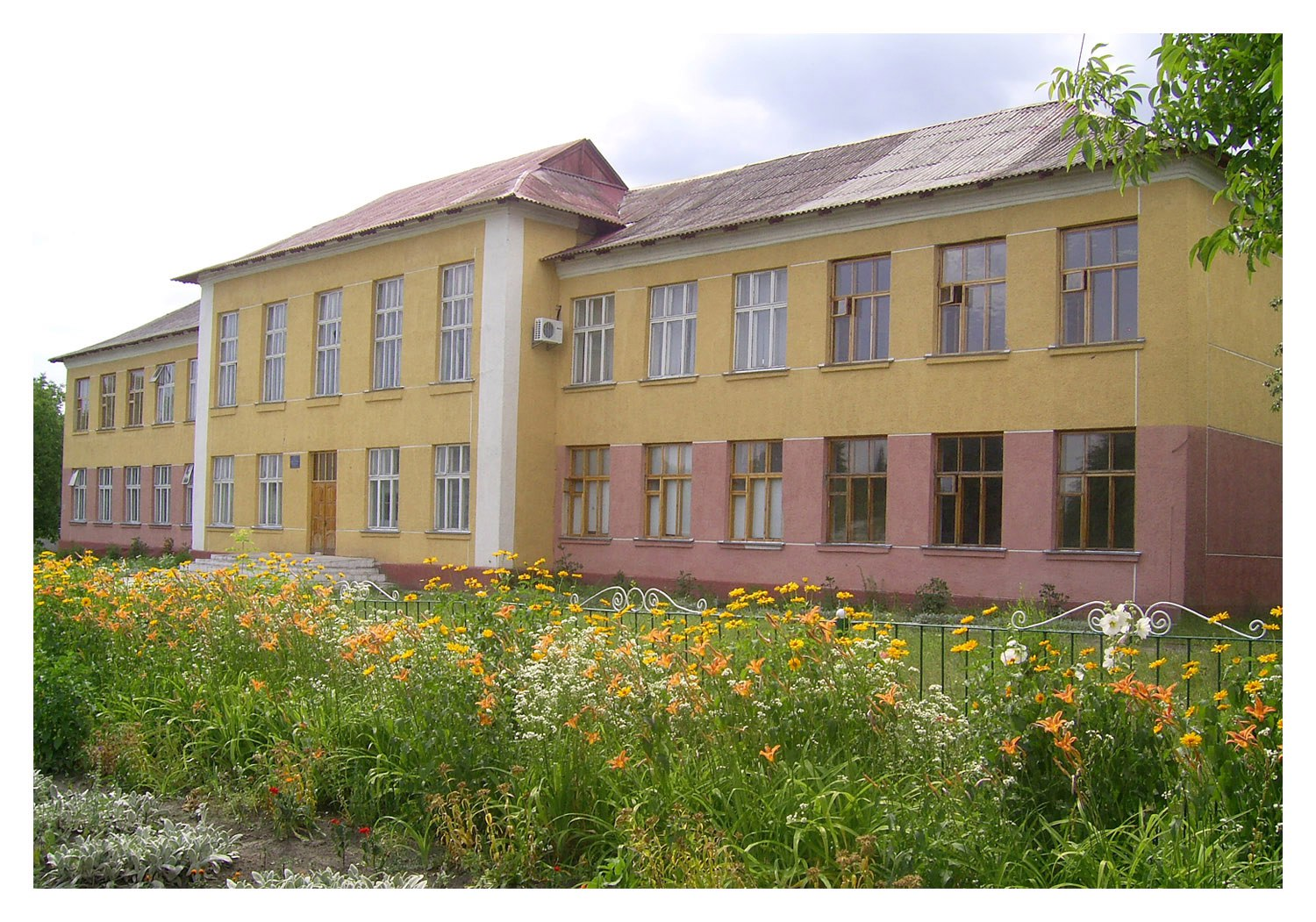
Hoshcha gymnasium

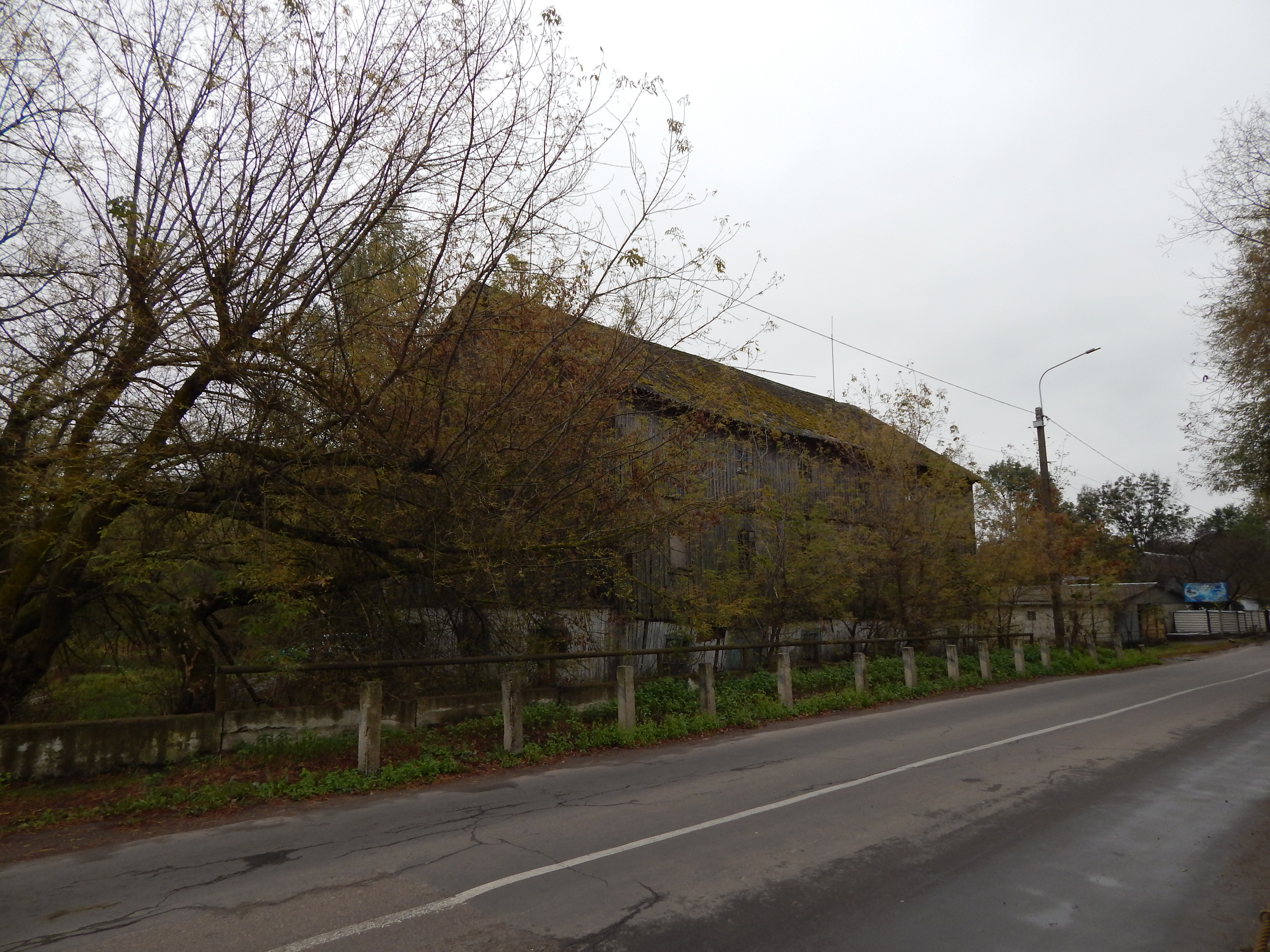
Old water mill

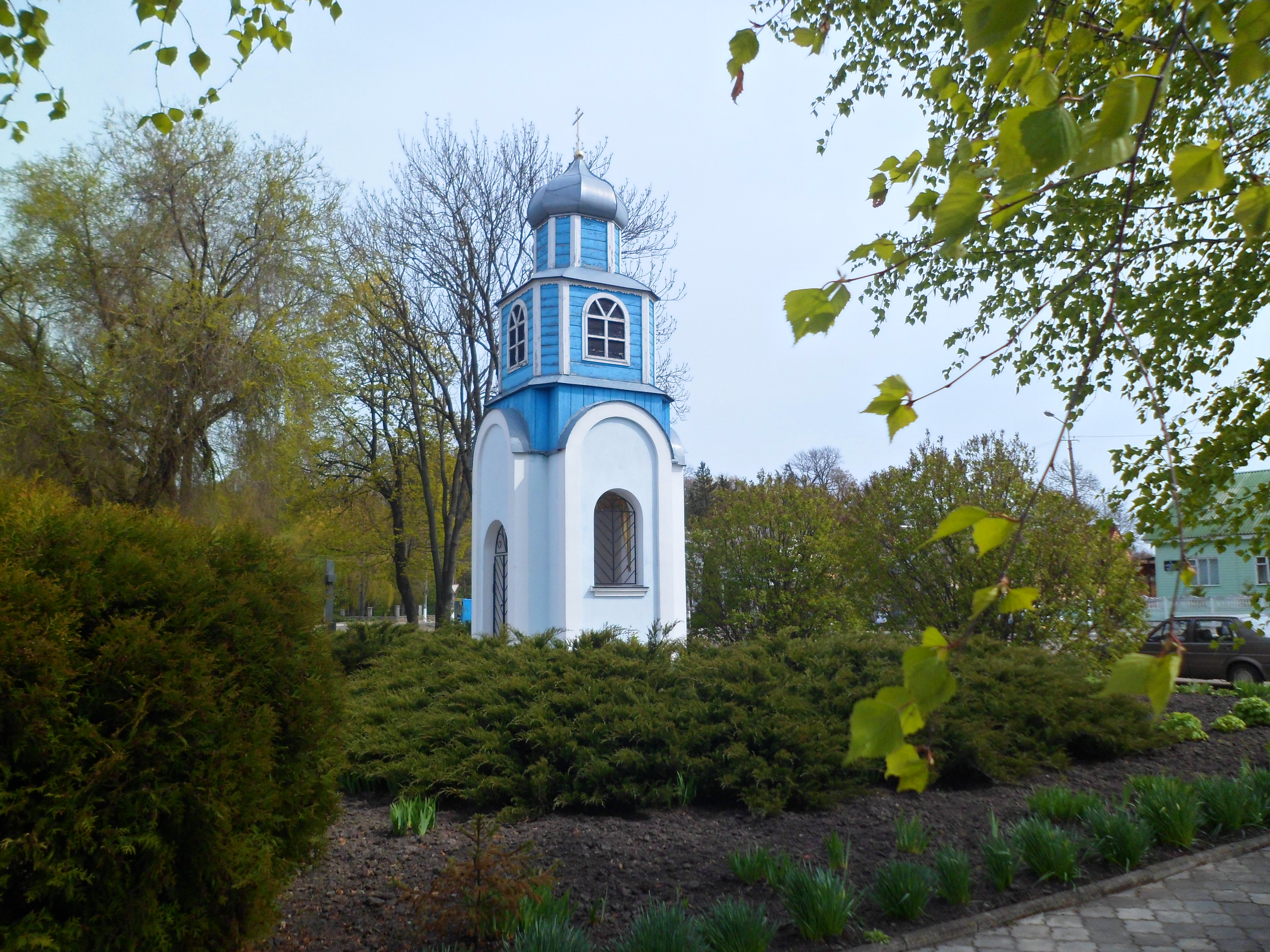
Chapel
