= Hrad (castle) =

Hrad is the Czech and Slovak word for castle and is commonly used as a part of castle name, e.g. Pražský hrad (Prague Castle), Spišský hrad (Spiš Castle), or Bratislavský hrad (Bratislava Castle). When spelt with capital letter H, it refers to Prague Castle, and is usually used metonymically to refer to the Czech (or, historically, Czechoslovak) government.

== See also ==
- List of castles in Slovakia
- List of castles in the Czech Republic
