= Grod (toponymy) =

Slavic toponym

Grod or Gord (archaeology) is a version of the Slavic word meaning town, city or castle, and is preserved in the toponymy of numerous Slavic countries:

- Ogrodzieniec
- Grodzisk Mazowiecki
