= Kastorfer See =

Lake in Mecklenburg-Vorpommern, Germany

- Location within Mecklenburg-Vorpommern
- Location: Mecklenburgische Seenplatte, Mecklenburg-Vorpommern
- Coordinates: 53°39′1″N 13°5′24″E
- Primary outflows: Lühmbach
- Basin countries: Germany
- Surface area: 0.64 km^{2} (0.25 sq mi)
- Max. depth: 11 m (36 ft)
- Surface elevation: 45.3 m (149 ft)

Kastorfer See is a lake in the Mecklenburgische Seenplatte district in Mecklenburg-Vorpommern, Germany. At an elevation of 45.3 m, its surface area is 0.64 km^{2}.
