= Kliestow =

Coordinates: 52.391°N 14.398°E

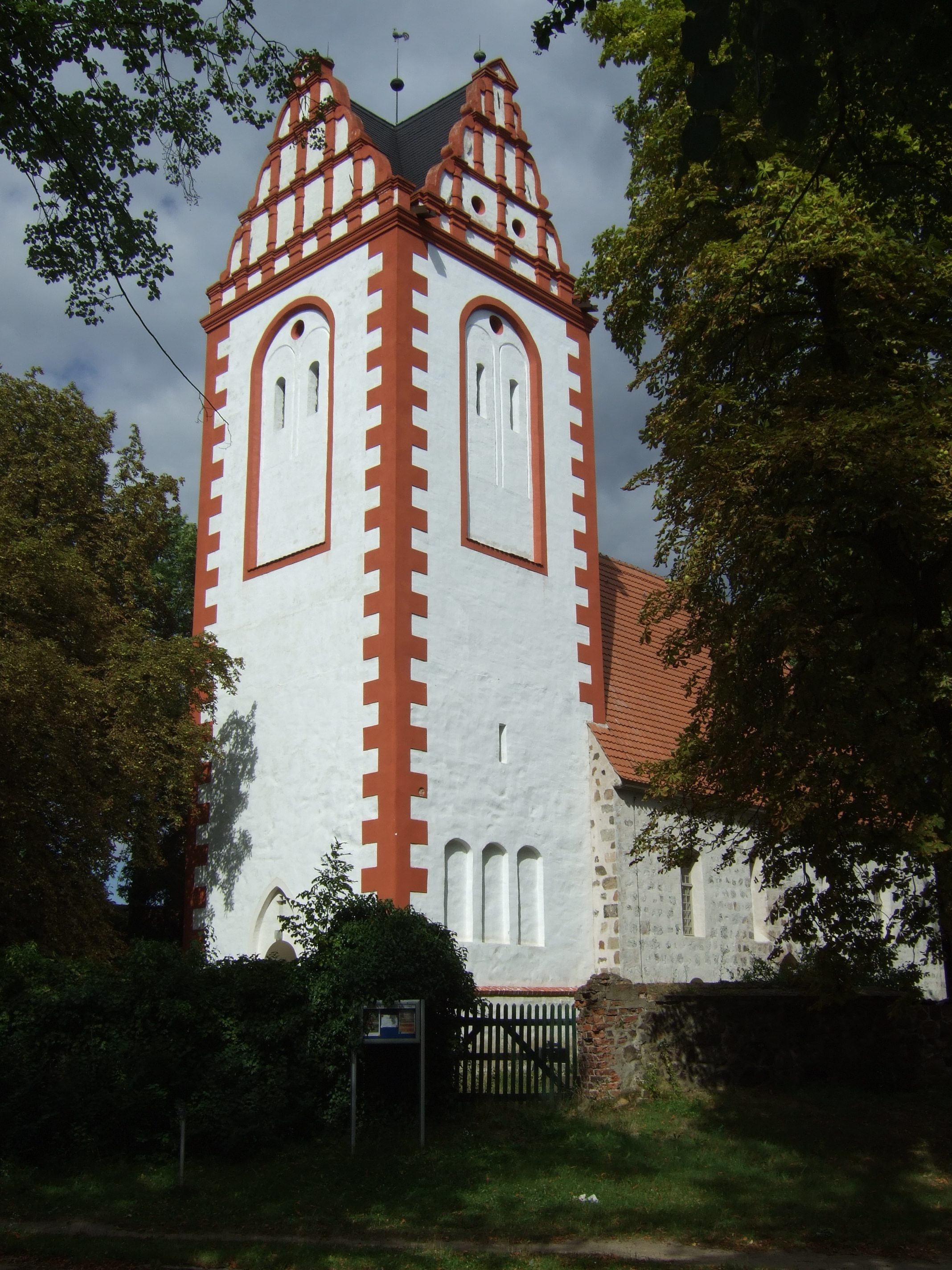
Church in Kliestow

Kliestow is an Ortsteil of Frankfurt (Oder), Germany, with a population of 1,194.

Kliestow is approx. 80 km (50 miles) east of Berlin.
