= Grzybowo, Września County =

Grzybowo
- Village
- Location within Poland
- Coordinates: 52°22′5″N 17°38′38″E
- Country: Poland
- Voivodeship: Greater Poland
- County: Września
- Gmina: Września

Grzybowo [ɡʐɨˈbɔvɔ] is a village in the administrative district of Gmina Września, within Września County, Greater Poland Voivodeship, in west-central Poland.

Monuments:

- Manor house in Grzybów
