= Hrad (toponymy) =

Hrad or gord (archaeology) is a version of the Slavic word meaning castle. It is mostly found in Czech, Slovak, Belarusian and Ukrainian, which, unlike the other Slavic languages, do not use hard 'g' except in loanwords. It is preserved in the toponymy of the four countries where the languages are spoken:

- Hradec
- Hradec Králové, Czech Republic
- Hradisko, Slovakia
- Hradiště
- Jindřichův Hradec, Czech Republic
- Krasnohrad, Ukraine
- Novohrad
- Novohrad Volynskyi, former name of Zviahel, Ukraine
- Pavlohrad, Ukraine
- Uherské Hradiště, Czech Republic
- Vyšehrad, Czech Republic
