= Hoshcha Raion =

Former subdivision of Rivne Oblast, Ukraine

Hoshcha Raion Гощанський район
- Raion
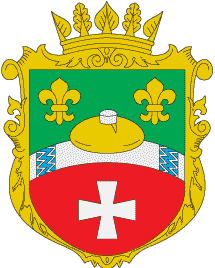
- Flag Coat of arms

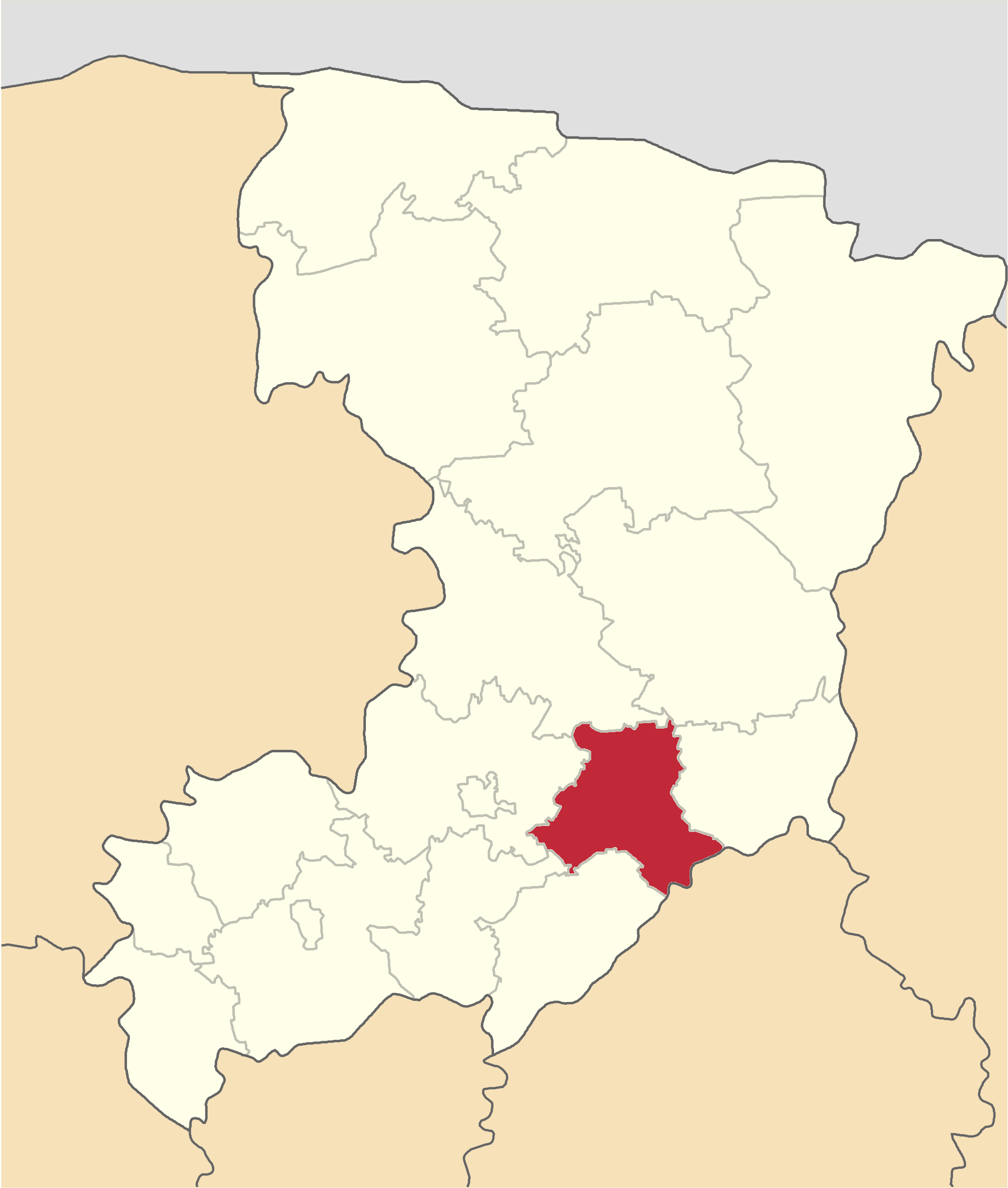
- Coordinates: 50°36′49.6578″N 26°39′2.1522″E
- Country: Ukraine
- Oblast: Rivne Oblast
- Established: 1940
- Disestablished: 18 July 2020
- Admin. center: Hoshcha
- Subdivisions: List: — city councils; — settlement councils; — rural councils; Number of localities: — cities; — urban-type settlements; 63 — villages; — rural settlements

Area
  - Total: 690 km^{2} (270 sq mi)

Population (2020)
  - Total: 34,401
  - Density: 50/km^{2} (130/sq mi)
- Time zone: UTC+02:00 (EET)
  - Summer (DST): UTC+03:00 (EEST)
- Area code: 380-3650
- Website: http://grr.gov.ua/ Hoshcha Raion

Hoshcha Raion (Ukrainian: Гощанський район) was a raion in Rivne Oblast in western Ukraine. Its administrative center was the urban-type settlement of Hoshcha. The raion was abolished and its territory was merged into Rivne Raion on 18 July 2020 as part of the administrative reform of Ukraine, which reduced the number of raions of Rivne Oblast to four. The last estimate of the raion population was 34,401 (2020 est.)

== See also ==
- Subdivisions of Ukraine
