= Bryja =

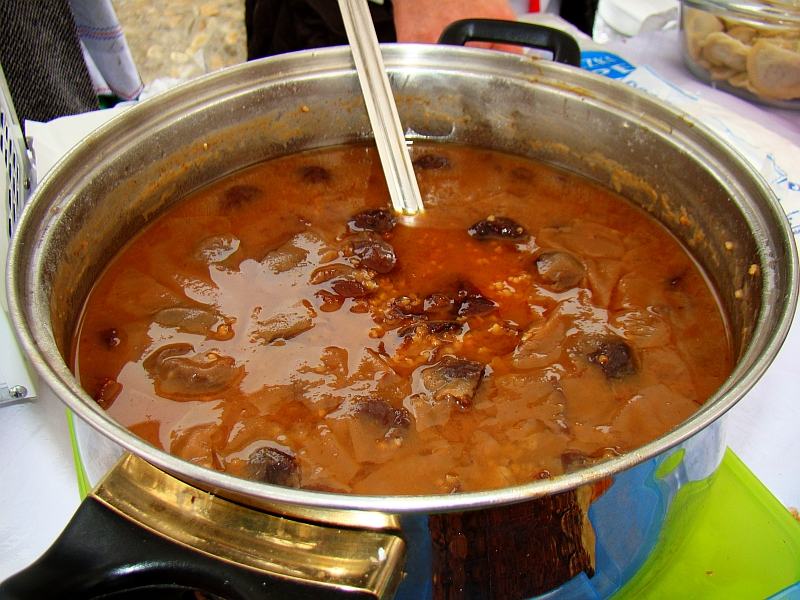
- Breja po kapucińsku
- Alternative names: Breja, brejka, breha, Brei
- Type: Kasza
- Course: Main
- Place of origin: Silesia, Germany, Poland
- Serving temperature: Hot
- Main ingredients: Kasza, millet

Bryja – thin kasza or mash, a Germanic, Celtic and Slavic dish, based on overcooked oat or kasza, that formed the basis of their respectable cuisine. It is also the name of a traditional Silesian dish served during Wigilia. The dish's names: bryja, breja, brejka, breha, the German Brei have their roots in Celtic languages.

== Variations ==
While a primarily savoury dish, the bryja base can also produce different types of sweets, including the poppy seed-based kutia, as well as the traditional Silesian dish with the same name, made from plums, apples, pears, with the addition of śmietana, wheat flour, cinnamon, sugar and salt.

== See also ==
- Polish cuisine
- Silesian cuisine
